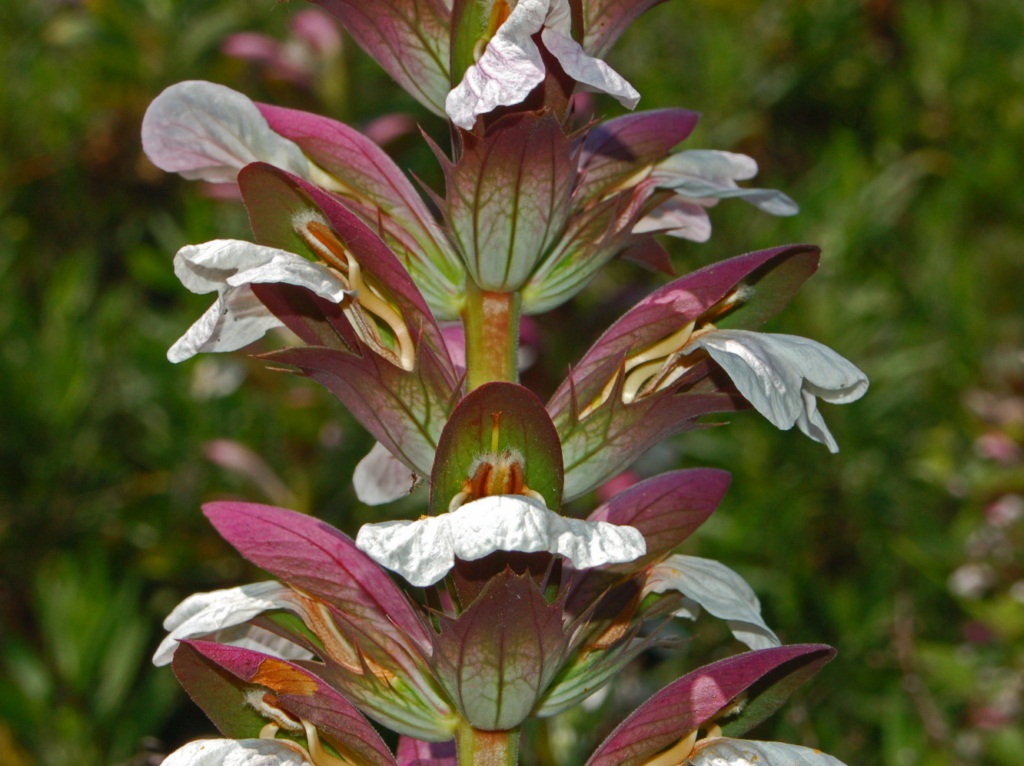
- Acanthus mollis
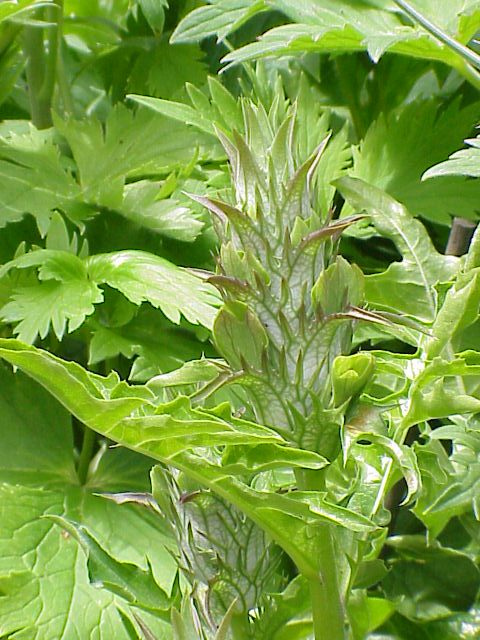

Scientific classification
- Kingdom: Plantae
- Clade: Tracheophytes
- Clade: Angiosperms
- Clade: Eudicots
- Clade: Asterids
- Order: Lamiales
- Family: Acanthaceae
- Subfamily: Acanthoideae; Eaton, 1836

Type genus
- Acanthus

Tribes
- See text

= Acanthoideae =

Subfamily of flowering plants

Acanthoideae is a subfamily of plants in the family Acanthaceae.

== Tribes and genera ==
Wikispecies lists the following genera in six tribes:

=== Acantheae ===
- Acanthopsis
- Acanthus
- Achyrocalyx
- Aphanandrium
- Aphelandra
- Blepharis
- Crossandra
- Crossandrella
- Cynarospermum
- Cyphacanthus
- Encephalosphaera
- Geissomeria
- Holographis
- Neriacanthus
- Orophochilus
- Rhombochlamys
- Salpixantha
- Sclerochiton
- Stenandrium
- Streptosiphon
- Strobilacanthus
- Xantheranthemum

=== Andrographideae ===
- Andrographis (synonym Indoneesiella)
- Cystacanthus
- Graphandra
- Gymnostachyum
- Haplanthodes
- Phlogacanthus (synonym Diotacanthus)

=== Barlerieae ===
- Barleria
- Barleriola
- Borneacanthus
- Boutonia
- Chroesthes
- Crabbea (synonyms: Acanthostelma, Golaea)
- Hulemacanthus
- Lasiocladus
- Lepidagathis (synonym Acanthura)
- Lophostachys

=== Justicieae ===
- Afrofittonia
- Ambongia
- Ancistranthus
- Angkalanthus
- Anisacanthus
- Anisotes
- Anthacanthus
- Aphanosperma
- Ascotheca
- Asystasia
- Ballochia
- Brachystephanus (synonym Oreacanthus)
- Calycacanthus
- Carlowrightia
- Celerina
- Cephalacanthus
- Chalarothyrsus
- Chamaeranthemum
- Chileranthemum
- Chlamydocardia
- Chlamydostachya
- Chorisochora
- Clinacanthus
- Clistax
- Codonacanthus
- Conocalyx
- Cosmianthemum
- Cyclacanthus
- Danguya
- Dasytropis
- Dichazothece
- Dicladanthera
- Dicliptera (synonym Peristrophe)
- Ecbolium
- Filetia
- Fittonia
- Forcipella
- Graptophyllum
- Gypsacanthus
- Harpochilus
- Henrya
- Herpetacanthus (synonym Juruasia)
- Hoverdenia
- Hypoestes
- Isoglossa
- Jadunia
- Justicia (synonym Megalostoma)
- Kalbreyeriella
- Kudoacanthus
- Linariantha
- Mackaya
- Marcania
- Megalochlamys
- Megaskepasma
- Melittacanthus
- Metarungia
- Mexacanthus
- Mirandea
- Monechma
- Monothecium
- Odontonema
- Oplonia
- Pachystachys
- Pelecostemon
- Phialacanthus
- Podorungia
- Poikilacanthus
- Populina
- Pranceacanthus
- Pseuderanthemum
- Pseudodicliptera
- Psilanthele
- Ptyssiglottis
- Pulchranthus
- Rhinacanthus
- Ritonia
- Rungia
- Ruspolia
- Ruttya
- Samuelssonia
- Sapphoa
- Schaueria
- Sebastiano-schaueria Nees
- Spathacanthus
- Sphinctacanthus
- Stenostephanus (synonyms Cylindrosolenium, Razisea)
- Streblacanthus
- Tessmanniacanthus
- Tetramerium
- Thyrsacanthus
- Thysanostigma
- Trichaulax
- Trichocalyx
- Xerothamnella
- Yeatesia

=== Ruellieae ===
- Acanthopale
- Aechmanthera
- Benoicanthus
- Bravaisia
- Brillantaisia
- Brunoniella
- Calacanthus
- Clarkeasia
- Dinteracanthus
- Dischistocalyx
- Duosperma
- Dyschoriste (synonyms: Apassalus, Sautiera)
- Echinacanthus
- Eranthemum
- Eremomastax
- Hemigraphis
- Heteradelphia
- Hygrophila
- Kosmosiphon
- Leptosiphonium
- Louteridium
- Lychniothyrsus
- Mellera (synonym Ionacanthus)
- Mimulopsis (synonym Epiclastopelma)
- Pararuellia
- Petalidium
- Phaulopsis
- Physacanthus
- Pseudoruellia
- Ruellia
- Ruelliopsis
- Sanchezia
- Satanocrater
- Spirostigma
- Stenosiphonium
- Stenothyrsus
- Strobilanthes
- Strobilanthopsis
- Suessenguthia
- Trichanthera
- Trichosanchezia
- Zygoruellia

=== Whitfieldieae ===
- Camarotea
- Chlamydacanthus (synonym Theileamea)
- Forcipella
- Lankesteria
- Leandriella
- Vindasia
- Whitfieldia
