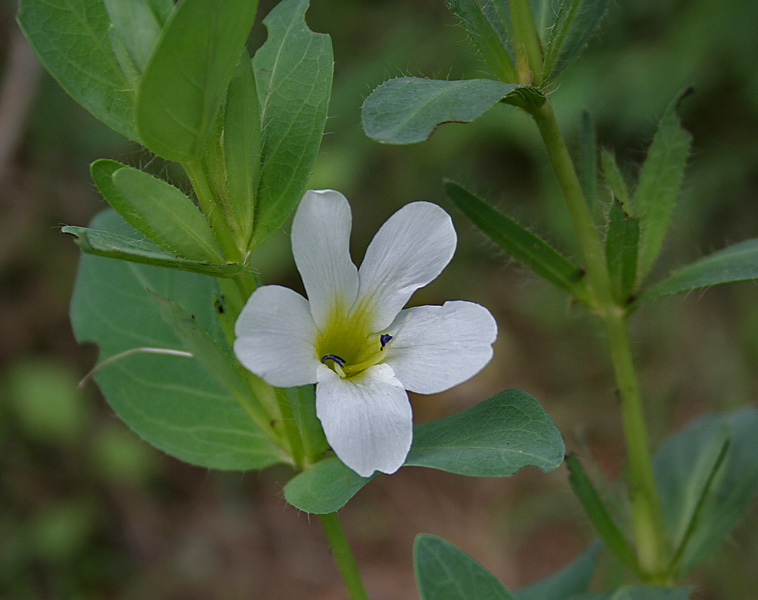
- Barleria sp.

Scientific classification
- Kingdom: Plantae
- Clade: Tracheophytes
- Clade: Angiosperms
- Clade: Eudicots
- Clade: Asterids
- Order: Lamiales
- Family: Acanthaceae
- Subfamily: Acanthoideae
- Tribe: Barlerieae; Nees, 1847

Genera
- See text

= Barlerieae =

Tribe of flowering plants

Barlerieae is a tribe of flowering plants in the family Acanthaceae.

== Taxonomy ==
Barlerieae contains the following genera:

- Lasiocladus
- Barleriola
- Boutonia
- Chroesthes
- Hulemacanthus
- Pericalypta
- Borneacanthus
- Schaueriopsis
- Pseudodicliptera
- Crabbea
- Podorungia
- Lepidagathis
- Lophostachys
- Barleria
