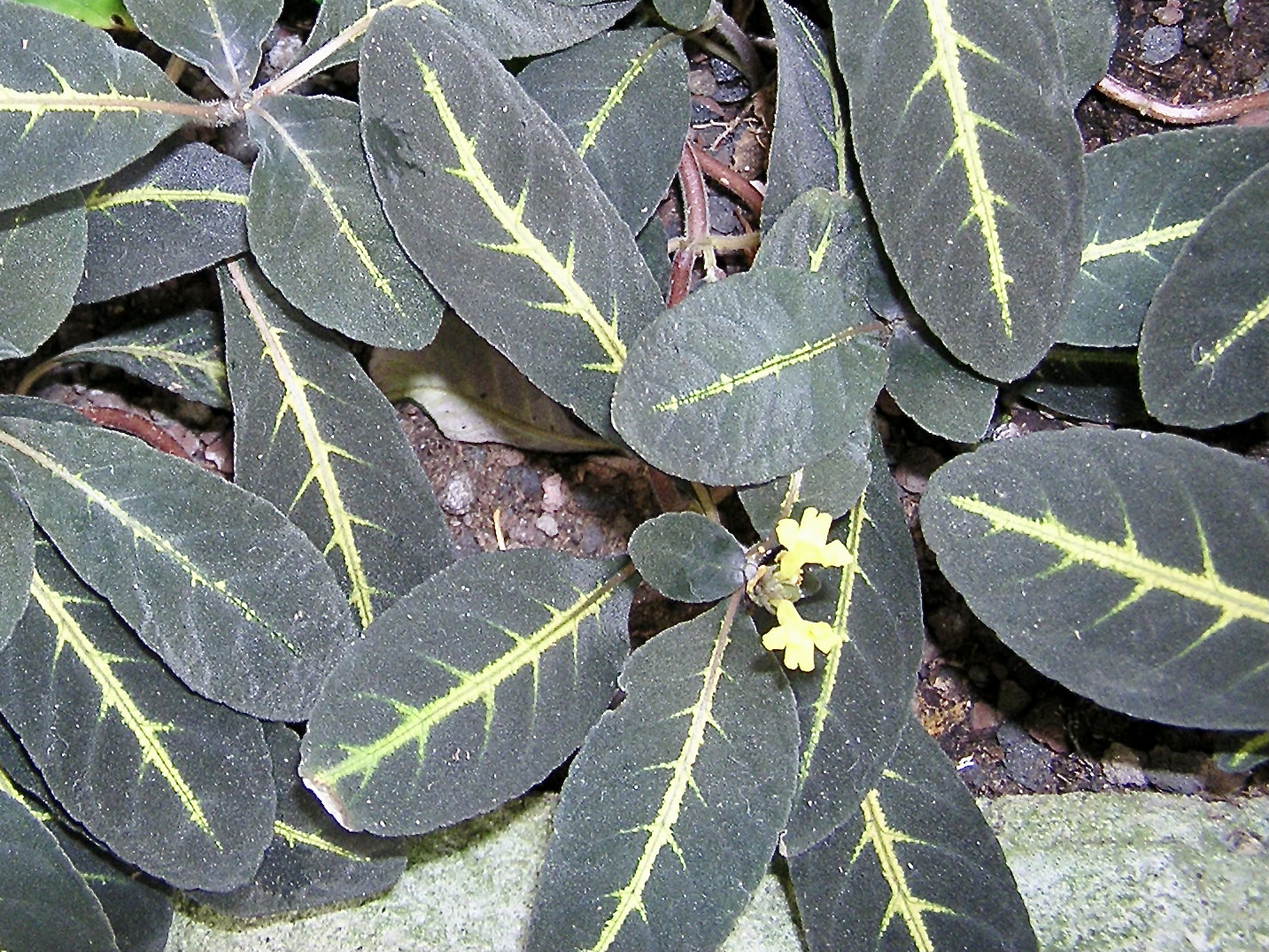

Scientific classification
- Kingdom: Plantae
- Clade: Embryophytes
- Clade: Tracheophytes
- Clade: Angiosperms
- Clade: Eudicots
- Clade: Asterids
- Order: Lamiales
- Family: Acanthaceae
- Tribe: Acantheae
- Genus: Xantheranthemum; Lindau (1893)
- Species: X. igneum

Binomial name
- Xantheranthemum igneum (Regel) Lindau (1895)

Synonyms
- Chamaeranthemum igneum Regel (1868)

= Xantheranthemum =

Genus of flowering plants

Xantheranthemum, known as the golden vein plant or bronze vein plant, is a genus of flowering plants in the family Acanthaceae. It has only one currently accepted species, Xantheranthemum igneum, native to Peru. It is grown as a greenhouse or house plant. There may be some confusion caused by the names of the botanists Linden and Lindau, as some sources associate it with Aphelandra goodspeedii Standl. & F.A.Barkley, along with Chamaeranthemum igneum Regel, Eranthemum igneum Linden, Stenandrium igneum (Linden) André, Stenandrium pictum N.E.Br., and Xantheranthemum igneum (Linden) Lindau.
