= Psilanthele =

Conservation status
- Critically Endangered (IUCN 3.1)

Scientific classification
- Kingdom: Plantae
- Clade: Tracheophytes
- Clade: Angiosperms
- Clade: Eudicots
- Clade: Asterids
- Order: Lamiales
- Family: Acanthaceae
- Subfamily: Acanthoideae
- Tribe: Justicieae
- Genus: Psilanthele; Lindau
- Species: P. eggersii

Binomial name
- Psilanthele eggersii Lindau (1897)

Genus of flowering plants

Psilanthele is a genus of plants in the family Acanthaceae, subfamily Acanthoideae, tribe Justicieae. The genus contains only one species, Psilanthele eggersii, which is native to Ecuador. Its habitat is coastal forest up to an elevation of 530 m. It was assessed in 2003 as "critically endangered".
