= Trichaulax =

Trichaulax may refer to:

- Trichaulax (beetle), a genus of insects in the family Scarabaeidae
- Trichaulax (plant), a genus of flowering plants in the family Acanthaceae
