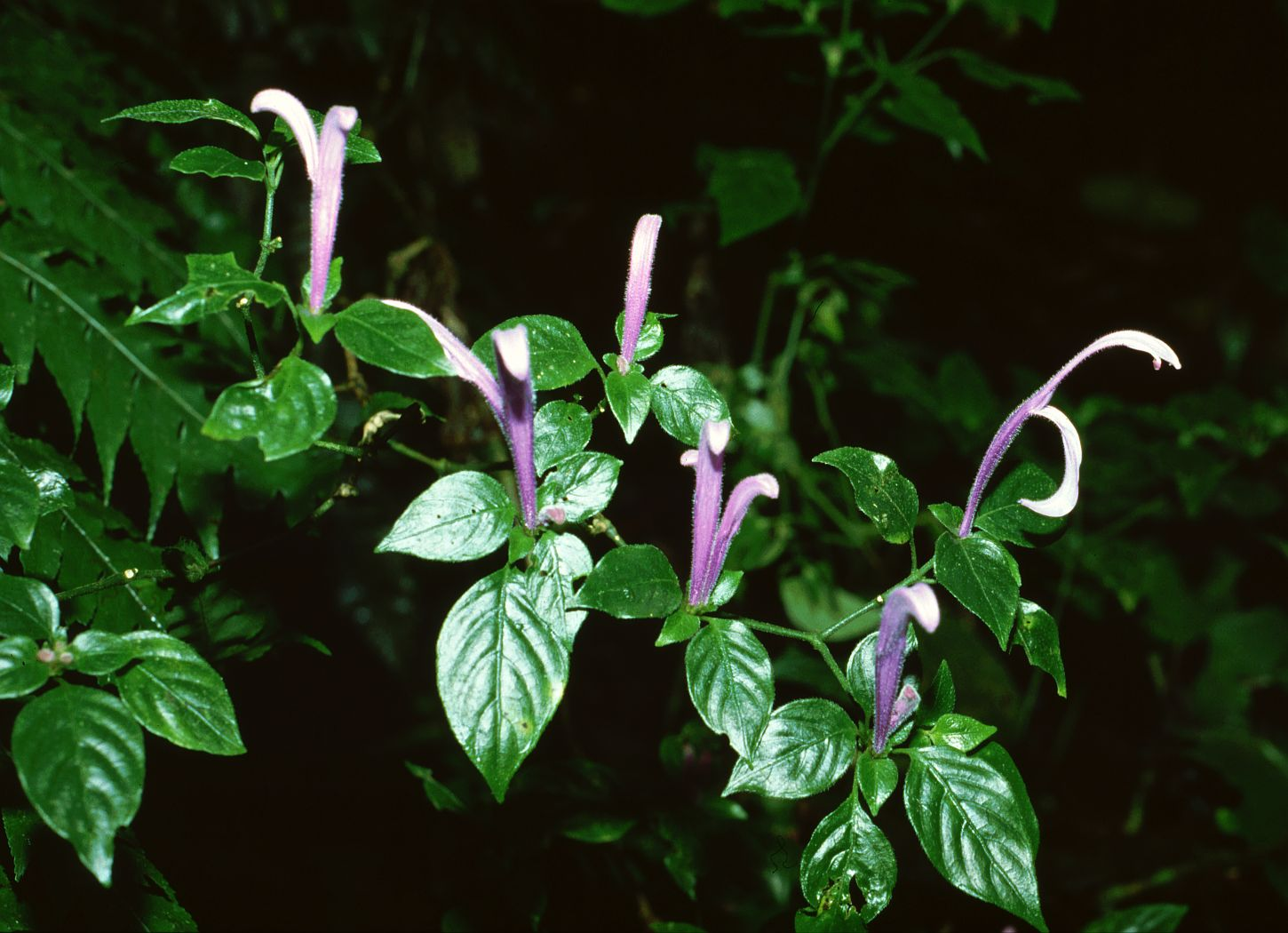
- Poikilacanthus macranthus

Scientific classification
- Kingdom: Plantae
- Clade: Tracheophytes
- Clade: Angiosperms
- Clade: Eudicots
- Clade: Asterids
- Order: Lamiales
- Family: Acanthaceae
- Subfamily: Acanthoideae
- Tribe: Justicieae
- Genus: Poikilacanthus; Lindau (1893)

Species
- 13; see text

= Poikilacanthus =

Genus of flowering plants

Poikilacanthus is a genus of flowering plants in the family Acanthaceae. It includes 13 species native to the tropical Americas, ranging from central Mexico to northern Argentina.

== Species ==
13 species are accepted

- Poikilacanthus bahiensis (Nees) Wassh.
- Poikilacanthus capitatus (Leonard) Ramamoorthy
- Poikilacanthus foliosepalus T.F.Daniel
- Poikilacanthus glandulosus (Nees) Ariza
- Poikilacanthus harlingii Wassh.
- Poikilacanthus humilis Lindau
- Poikilacanthus macranthus Lindau
- Poikilacanthus moritzianus (Nees) Lindau
- Poikilacanthus novogalicianus T.F.Daniel
- Poikilacanthus pansamalanus (Donn.Sm.) D.N.Gibson
- Poikilacanthus pochutlensis T.F.Daniel
- Poikilacanthus skutchii D.N.Gibson
- Poikilacanthus tweedieanus (Nees) Lin
