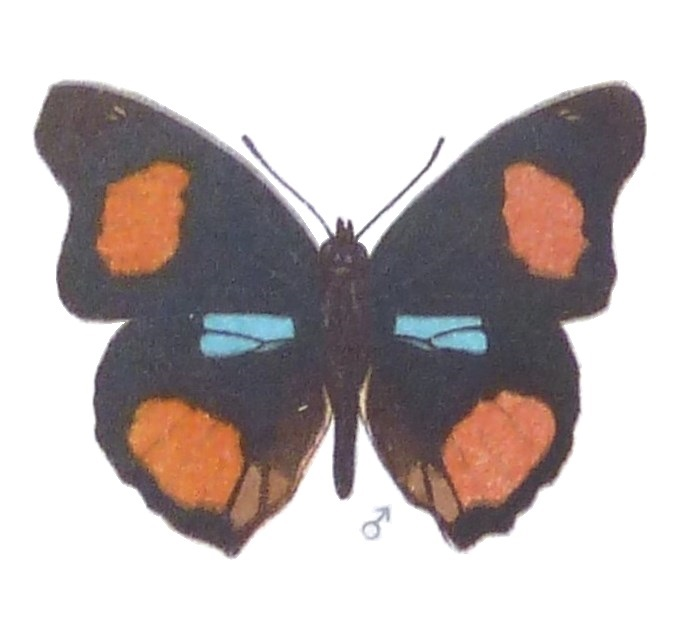

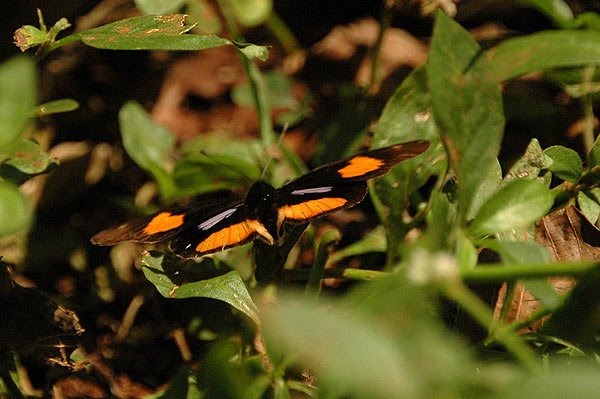
- male

Scientific classification
- Domain: Eukaryota
- Kingdom: Animalia
- Phylum: Arthropoda
- Class: Insecta
- Order: Lepidoptera
- Family: Nymphalidae
- Genus: Junonia
- Species: J. westermanni

Binomial name
- Junonia westermanni (Westwood, 1870)

Synonyms
- Precis westermanni Westwood, 1870; Junonia westermanni f. lugens Ungemach, 1932; Precis westermanni splendens Schmidt, 1921; Precis westermanni suffusa Rothschild & Jordan, 1903; Precis westermanni f. jordani Aurivillius, 1913; Junonia westermanni f. nigricans Stoneham, 1934; Junonia westermanni f. pallida Stoneham, 1965; Junonia westermanni f. nucleata Stoneham, 1965

= Junonia westermanni =

Blue spot pansy

Species of butterfly

Junonia westermanni, the blue spot pansy, is a butterfly of the family Nymphalidae. It is found in the central part of the Afrotropical realm.

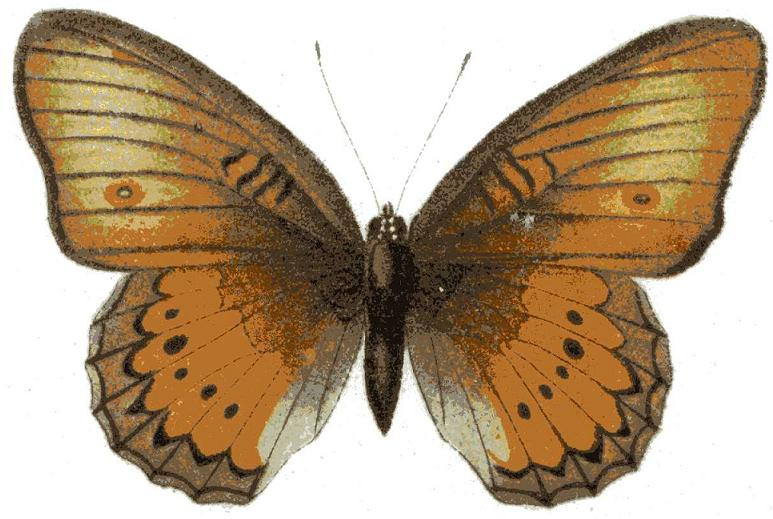

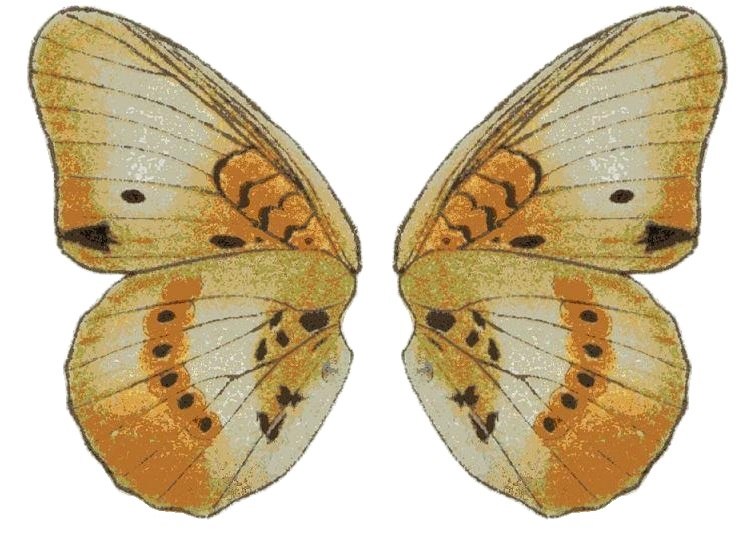
female, upper and underside

Its wingspan is about 25 mm.

The larvae feed on Asystasia, Brillantaisia, Barleria, Justicia, Eremomastax, Ruellia, and Pupalia.

== Subspecies ==
- J. w. westermanni — Ivory Coast to Angola, Zaire, south-western Ethiopia
- J. w. suffusa (Rothschild & Jordan, 1903) — western Uganda to Kenya
- J. w. splendens (Schmidt, 1921) — eastern Tanzania, from the Usambara Mountains to Lindi
