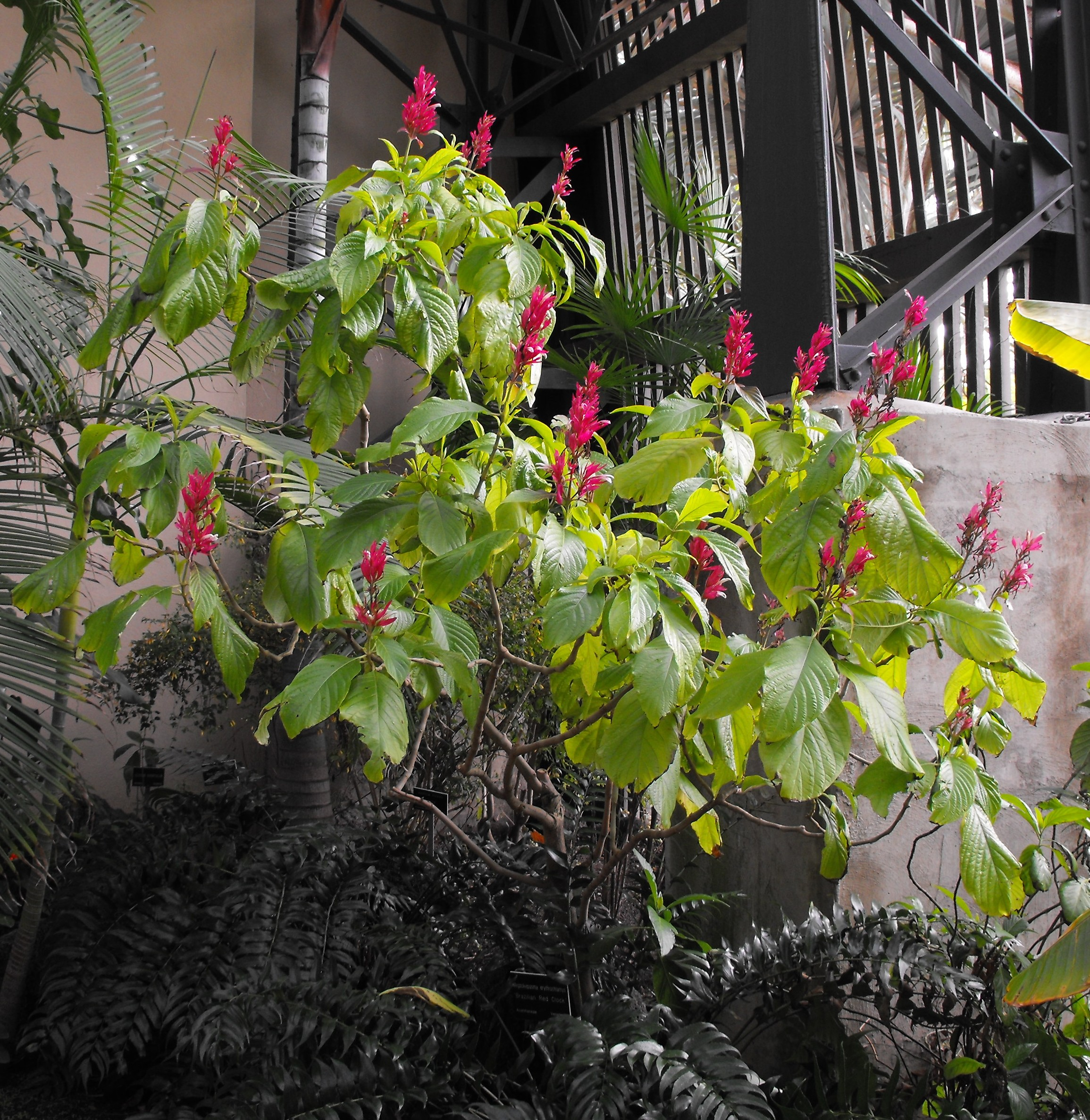

Scientific classification
- Kingdom: Plantae
- Clade: Tracheophytes
- Clade: Angiosperms
- Clade: Eudicots
- Clade: Asterids
- Order: Lamiales
- Family: Acanthaceae
- Subfamily: Acanthoideae
- Tribe: Justicieae
- Genus: Megaskepasma; Lindau (1897)
- Species: M. erythrochlamys

Binomial name
- Megaskepasma erythrochlamys Lindau (1897)

Synonyms
- Perenideboles Ram.Goyena (1911); Perenideboles ciliatum Ram.Goyena (1911)

= Megaskepasma =

Genus of flowering plants

Megaskepasma is a monotypic genus of plants containing the single species Megaskepasma erythrochlamys, known by the common name Brazilian red-cloak. Native to Venezuela and Suriname, it is a free branching, upright showy tropical shrub that grows to 3 m high with appressed reddish hairs, stout stems, and broad ovate 12–30 cm long dark green leaves with pink midrib. It is grown as an ornamental shrub in climates from warm temperate to tropical for its inflorescence, large erect heads of conspicuous crimson bracts, and two-lipped white flowers. This plant prefers a rich soil and is propagated from seed or cuttings.
