= Henrya =

Henrya may refer to:

- Henrya (gastropod), a genus of gastropods in the family Murchisonellidae
- Henrya (plant), a genus of plants in the family Acanthaceae
