= Aphanandrium =

Scientific classification
- Kingdom: Plantae
- Clade: Tracheophytes
- Clade: Angiosperms
- Clade: Eudicots
- Clade: Asterids
- Order: Lamiales
- Family: Acanthaceae
- Subfamily: Acanthoideae
- Tribe: Acantheae
- Subtribe: Aphelandrinae
- Genus: Aphanandrium; Lindau

Genus of flowering plants

Aphanandrium is a genus of flowering plants in the family Acanthaceae. It includes five species native to the tropical Americas, ranging from Panama to Peru and northwestern Venezuela.

== Species ==
Five species are accepted.

- Aphanandrium grandiflorum (Leonard) Wassh.
- Aphanandrium harlingii (Wassh.) Wassh.
- Aphanandrium lehmannianum Lindau
- Aphanandrium narupayacuense Cornejo, Wassh. & Exe
- Aphanandrium nitidum (Leonard) Wassh.
