= Phaulopsis =

Scientific classification
- Kingdom: Plantae
- Clade: Tracheophytes
- Clade: Angiosperms
- Clade: Eudicots
- Clade: Asterids
- Order: Lamiales
- Family: Acanthaceae
- Subfamily: Acanthoideae
- Tribe: Ruellieae
- Genus: Phaulopsis; Willd. (1800), nom. cons.

Synonyms
- Aetheilema R.Br. (1810); Antheilema Raf. (1838); Micranthus J.C.Wendl. (1798), nom. rej.

Genus of plants

Phaulopsis is a genus of flowering plants belonging to the family Acanthaceae.

Its native range is Africa, Arabian Peninsula, Eastern Himalaya to China and Indo-China.

== Species ==
21 species are accepted.

- Phaulopsis aequivoca Mankt.
- Phaulopsis angolana S.Moore
- Phaulopsis barteri T.Anderson
- Phaulopsis ciliata (Willd.) Hepper
- Phaulopsis dorsiflora (Retz.) Santapau
- Phaulopsis gediensis Mankt.
- Phaulopsis grandiflora Mankt.
- Phaulopsis imbricata (Forssk.) Sweet
- Phaulopsis johnstonii C.B.Clarke
- Phaulopsis lankesterioides (Lindau) Lindau
- Phaulopsis latiloba Mankt.
- Phaulopsis lindaviana De Wild.
- Phaulopsis marcelinoi Mankt.
- Phaulopsis micrantha (Benth.) C.B.Clarke
- Phaulopsis pulchella Mankt.
- Phaulopsis sangana S.Moore
- Phaulopsis savannicola Mankt.
- Phaulopsis semiconica P.G.Mey.
- Phaulopsis symmetrica Mankt.
- Phaulopsis talbotii S.Moore
- Phaulopsis verticillaris (Nees) Mankt.
