= Satanocrater =

Scientific classification
- Kingdom: Plantae
- Clade: Embryophytes
- Clade: Tracheophytes
- Clade: Angiosperms
- Clade: Eudicots
- Clade: Asterids
- Order: Lamiales
- Family: Acanthaceae
- Subfamily: Acanthoideae
- Tribe: Ruellieae
- Subtribe: Ruelliinae
- Genus: Satanocrater; Schweinf.

Synonyms
- Haemacanthus S.Moore

Genus of African plants

Satanocrater (from σατανος‐, ‐κρατορας, meaning "devil's bowl") is a small genus of flowering plants in the family Acanthaceae, disjunctly distributed in Guinea in west Africa, and Ethiopia, Kenya, Somalia and Sudan in east Africa. They are xerophytes, and either shrubs or perennial herbs.

== Species ==
Currently accepted species include:

- Satanocrater fellatensis Schweinf.
- Satanocrater paradoxa (Lindau) Lindau
- Satanocrater ruspolii (Lindau) Lindau
- Satanocrater somalensis (Lindau) Lindau
