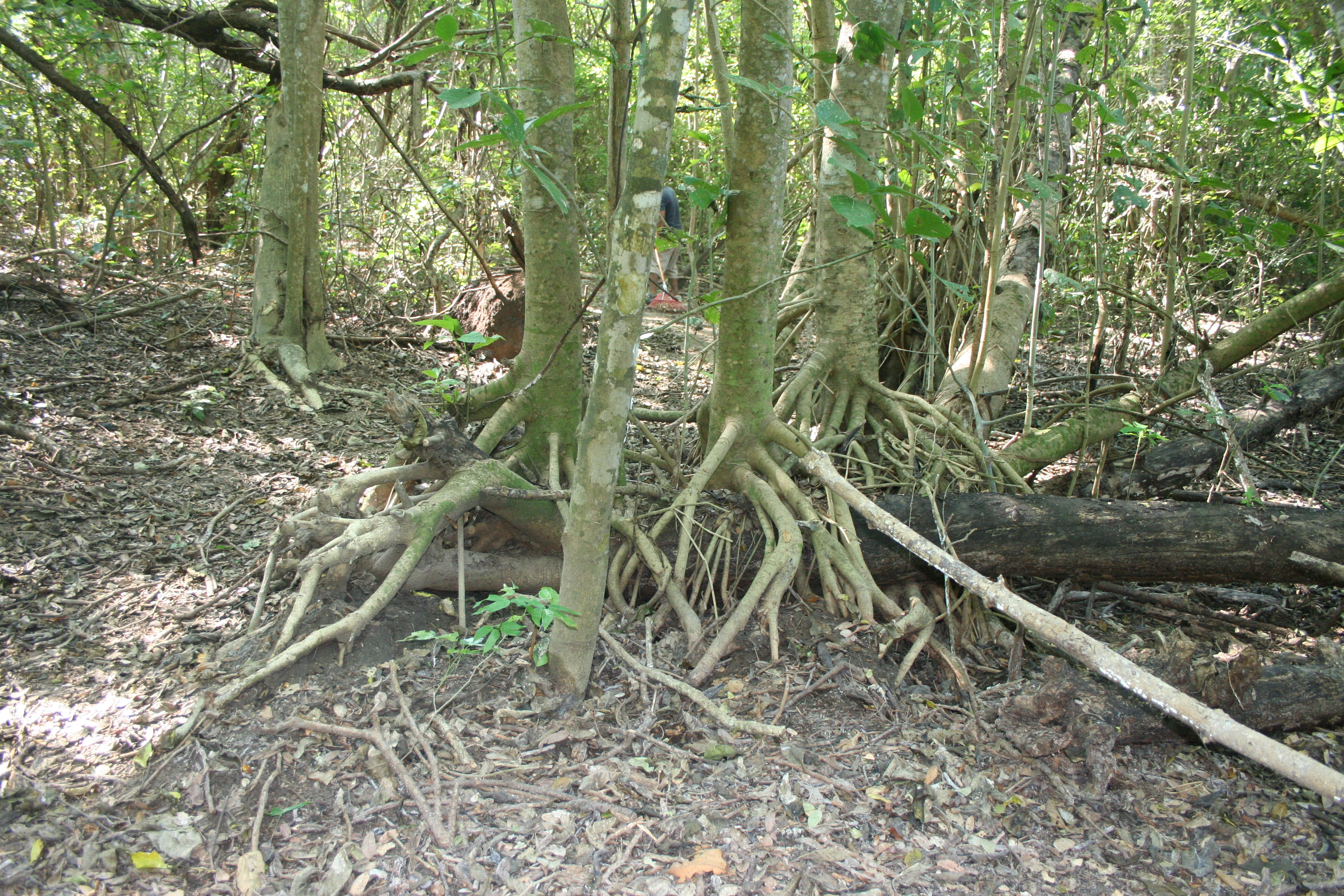
- Bravaisia integerrima

Scientific classification
- Kingdom: Plantae
- Clade: Tracheophytes
- Clade: Angiosperms
- Clade: Eudicots
- Clade: Asterids
- Order: Lamiales
- Family: Acanthaceae
- Subfamily: Acanthoideae
- Tribe: Ruellieae
- Genus: Bravaisia; DC. (1838)

Synonyms
- Androcentrum Lem. (1847); Onychacanthus Nees (1847)

= Bravaisia =

Genus of flowering plants

Bravaisia is a genus of plants in the family Acanthaceae. It includes three species of shrubs or trees native to Mexico, Central America, Colombia, Venezuela, Cuba, and Trinidad.

- Bravaisia berlandieriana (Nees) T.F.Daniel
- Bravaisia grandiflora Donn.Sm.
- Bravaisia integerrima (Spreng.) Standl.
