= Leptosiphonium =

Scientific classification
- Kingdom: Plantae
- Clade: Tracheophytes
- Clade: Angiosperms
- Clade: Eudicots
- Clade: Asterids
- Order: Lamiales
- Family: Acanthaceae
- Subfamily: Acanthoideae
- Genus: Leptosiphonium; F.Muell. (1886)

Species
- 10; see text

Genus of flowering plants

Leptosiphonium is a genus of flowering plants in the family Acanthaceae. It includes ten species native to New Guinea and the Solomon Islands.

== Species ==
Ten species are accepted:

- Leptosiphonium aruense (S.Moore) Bremek. & Nann.-Bremek.
- Leptosiphonium forbesii (S.Moore) Bremek. & Nann.-Bremek.
- Leptosiphonium garckeanum (K.Schum.) Bremek. & Nann.-Bremek.
- Leptosiphonium gloeocalyx (K.Schum.) Bremek. & Nann.-Bremek.
- Leptosiphonium guppyi (Hemsl.) Bremek. & Nann.-Bremek.
- Leptosiphonium papuanum (S.Moore) Bremek. & Nann.-Bremek.
- Leptosiphonium potamoxenos (K.Schum.) Bremek. & Nann.-Bremek.
- Leptosiphonium stricklandii F.Muell.
- Leptosiphonium versicolor (S.Moore) Bremek. & Nann.-Bremek.
- Leptosiphonium vestitum (Engl.) Bremek. & Nann.-Bremek.
