= Sebastiano-schaueria =

Scientific classification
- Kingdom: Plantae
- Clade: Tracheophytes
- Clade: Angiosperms
- Clade: Eudicots
- Clade: Asterids
- Order: Lamiales
- Family: Acanthaceae
- Tribe: Justicieae
- Genus: Sebastiano-schaueria; Nees (1847)
- Species: S. oblongata

Binomial name
- Sebastiano-schaueria oblongata Nees (1847)

Synonyms
- Sebschauera oblongata (Nees) Kuntze (1891)

Species of plants

Sebastiano-schaueria is a monotypic genus of flowering plants belonging to the family Acanthaceae. The only known species is Sebastiano-schaueria oblongata.

Its native range is southeastern Brazil.

The genus name of Sebastiano-schaueria is in honour of Sebastian Schauer (1814–1850), German gardener and botanist at botanical gardens in present-day Wrocław and Berlin. The Latin specific epithet of oblongata refers to oblangatus meaning oblong. Both the genus and the species were first described and published in C.F.P.von Martius & auct. suc. (eds.), Fl. Bras. Vol.9 on pages 158–159 in 1847. The genus is recognized by the United States Department of Agriculture and the Agricultural Research Service, but they do not list any known species.
