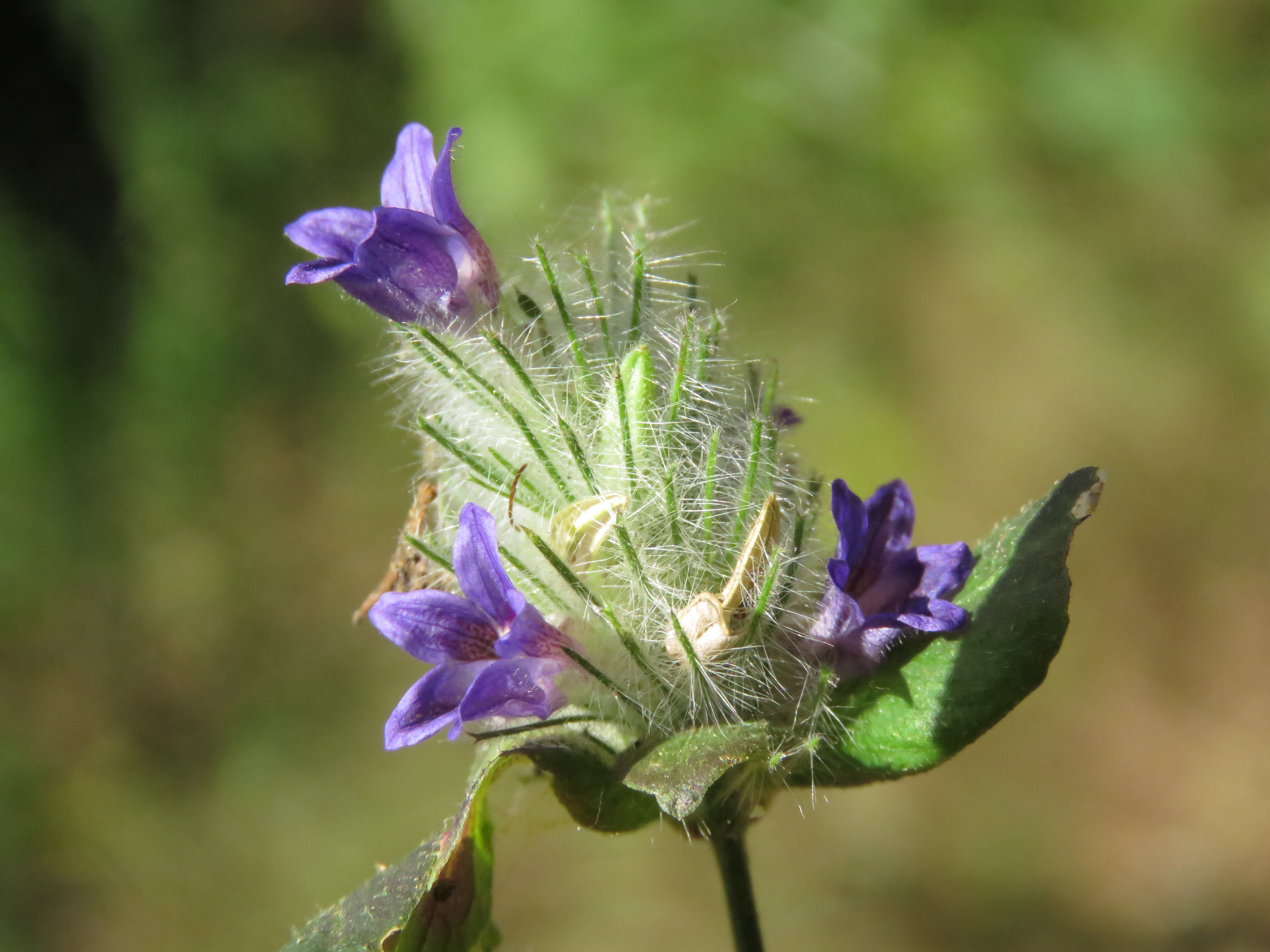
- Haplanthodes verticillatus at Mayyil

Scientific classification
- Kingdom: Plantae
- Clade: Tracheophytes
- Clade: Angiosperms
- Clade: Eudicots
- Clade: Asterids
- Order: Lamiales
- Family: Acanthaceae
- Subfamily: Acanthoideae
- Tribe: Andrographideae
- Genus: Haplanthodes; Kuntze (1903)

Synonyms
- Bremekampia Screem. (1965); Haplanthus T.Anderson (1867), nom. illeg.

= Haplanthodes =

Genus of flowering plants

Haplanthodes is a genus of flowering plants in the family Acanthaceae. It includes four species endemic to India.

== Species ==
Four species are accepted:

- Haplanthodes neilgherryensis (Wight) R.B.Majumdar
- Haplanthodes plumosa (T.Anderson) Panigrahi & G.C.Das
- Haplanthodes tentaculata (L.) R.B.Majumdar
- Haplanthodes verticillata (Roxb.) R.B.Majumdar
