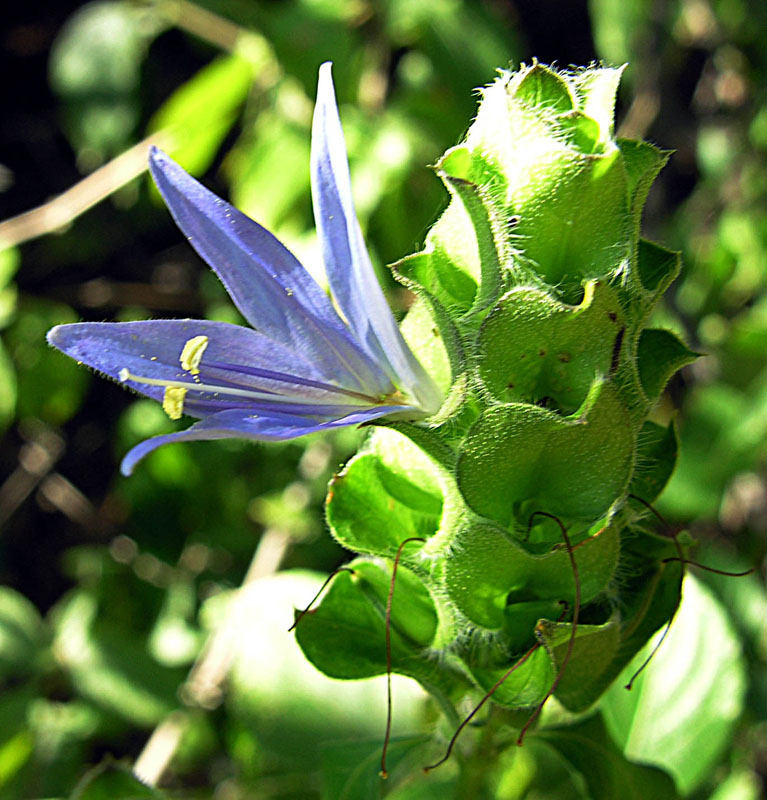
- Megalochlamys sp. near Dodoma, Tanzania.

Scientific classification
- Kingdom: Plantae
- Clade: Tracheophytes
- Clade: Angiosperms
- Clade: Eudicots
- Clade: Asterids
- Order: Lamiales
- Family: Acanthaceae
- Genus: Megalochlamys; Lindau (1899)

= Megalochlamys =

Genus of plants

Megalochlamys is a genus of flowering plants belonging to the family Acanthaceae.

Its native range is Eritrea to Southern Africa, and the southern Arabian Peninsula.

== Species ==
Species:

- Megalochlamys hamata (Klotzsch) Vollesen
- Megalochlamys kenyensis Vollesen
- Megalochlamys linifolia (Lindau) Lindau
- Megalochlamys marlothii (Engl.) Lindau
- Megalochlamys ogadenensis Vollesen
- Megalochlamys revoluta (Lindau) Vollesen
- Megalochlamys tanaensis Vollesen
- Megalochlamys tanzaniensis Vollesen
- Megalochlamys trinervia Vollesen
- Megalochlamys violacea (Vahl) Vollesen
