= Sphinctacanthus =

Scientific classification
- Kingdom: Plantae
- Clade: Embryophytes
- Clade: Tracheophytes
- Clade: Angiosperms
- Clade: Eudicots
- Clade: Asterids
- Order: Lamiales
- Family: Acanthaceae
- Subfamily: Acanthoideae
- Tribe: Justicieae
- Genus: Sphinctacanthus; Benth. (1876)

Species
- See text

Genus of flowering plants

Sphinctacanthus is a genus of flowering plants in the family Acanthaceae, native to Myanmar and Sumatra. Poorly attested, it seems to be found in tropical evergreen forests.

== Species ==
Currently accepted species include:

- Sphinctacanthus parkinsonii C.E.C.Fisch.
- Sphinctacanthus viridiflorus Ridl.
