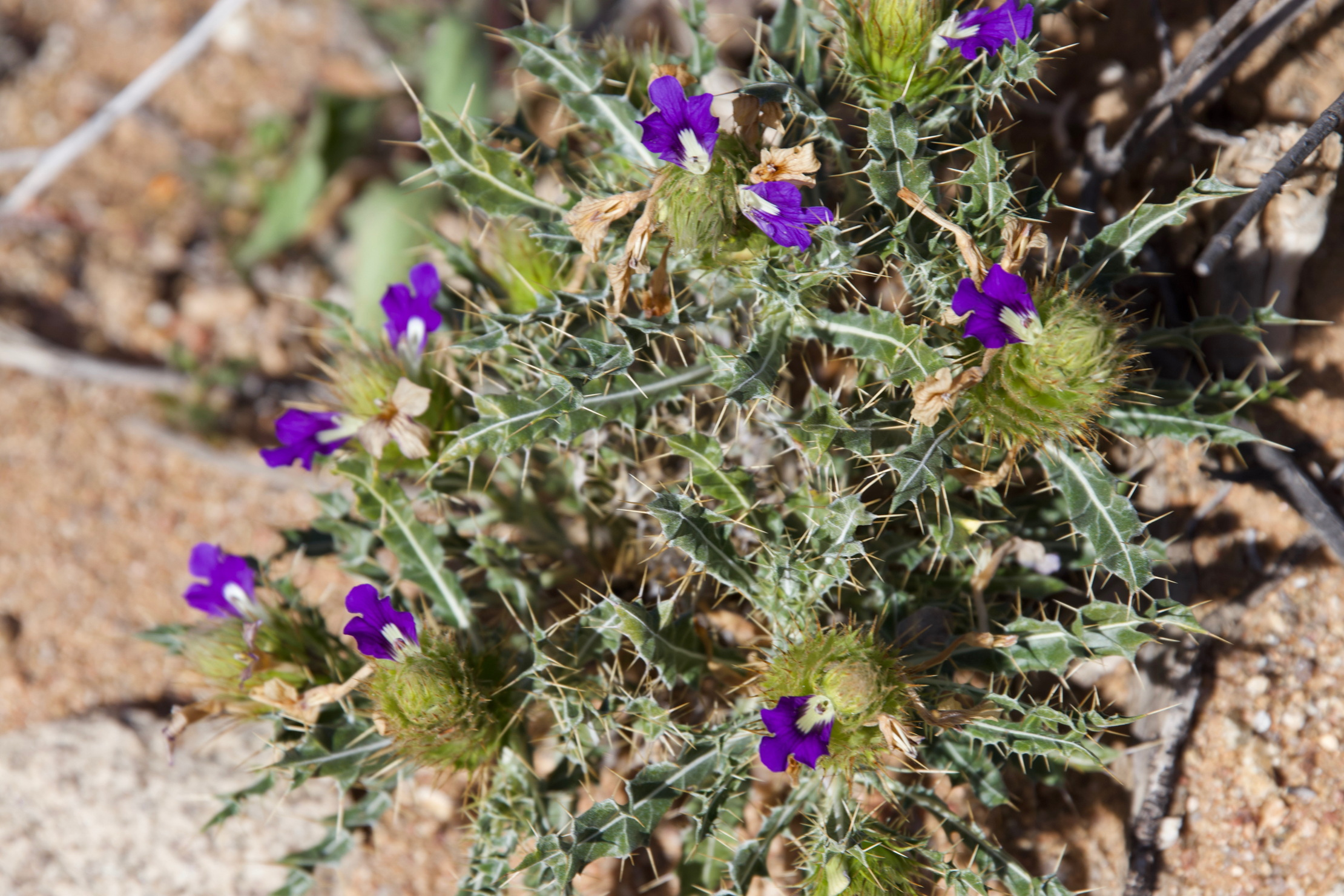

Scientific classification
- Kingdom: Plantae
- Clade: Tracheophytes
- Clade: Angiosperms
- Clade: Eudicots
- Clade: Asterids
- Order: Lamiales
- Family: Acanthaceae
- Subfamily: Acanthoideae
- Tribe: Acantheae
- Genus: Acanthopsis; Harv. (1842)

Species
- 20; see text

= Acanthopsis =

Genus of flowering plants

Acanthopsis is a genus of flowering plants in the family Acanthaceae. It includes 20 species native to Namibia and the Cape Provinces of South Africa.

== Species ==
20 species are accepted:

- Acanthopsis adamanticola H.M.Steyn
- Acanthopsis carduifolia (L.f.) Schinz
- Acanthopsis disperma Harv. ex Nees
- Acanthopsis dispermoides H.M.Steyn
- Acanthopsis dregeana H.M.Steyn
- Acanthopsis erosa H.M.Steyn
- Acanthopsis glabra (Nees) H.M.Steyn
- Acanthopsis glandulopalmata H.M.Steyn
- Acanthopsis glauca (Nees) Schinz
- Acanthopsis hoffmannseggiana (Nees) C.B.Clarke
- Acanthopsis horrida (Nees) Nees
- Acanthopsis insueta H.M.Steyn
- Acanthopsis ludoviciana H.M.Steyn
- Acanthopsis nitida H.M.Steyn
- Acanthopsis pagodiformis H.M.Steyn
- Acanthopsis scullyi (S.Moore) Oberm.
- Acanthopsis spathularis (Nees) Schinz
- Acanthopsis tetragona H.M.Steyn
- Acanthopsis tuba H.M.Steyn
- Acanthopsis villosa H.M.Steyn
