= Forcipella =

Scientific classification
- Kingdom: Plantae
- Clade: Embryophytes
- Clade: Tracheophytes
- Clade: Angiosperms
- Clade: Eudicots
- Clade: Asterids
- Order: Lamiales
- Family: Acanthaceae
- Subfamily: Acanthoideae
- Tribe: Whitfieldieae
- Genus: Forcipella; Baill.

Species
- See text

Synonyms
- non Forcipella Small

Genus of flowering plants

Forcipella is a genus of flowering plants in the family Acanthaceae, with all species native to Madagascar.

== Species ==
Currently accepted species include:

- Forcipella bosseri Benoist
- Forcipella cleistochlamys Lindau
- Forcipella involucrata Benoist
- Forcipella longistaminea Benoist
- Forcipella madagascariensis Baill.
- Forcipella repanda Benoist
