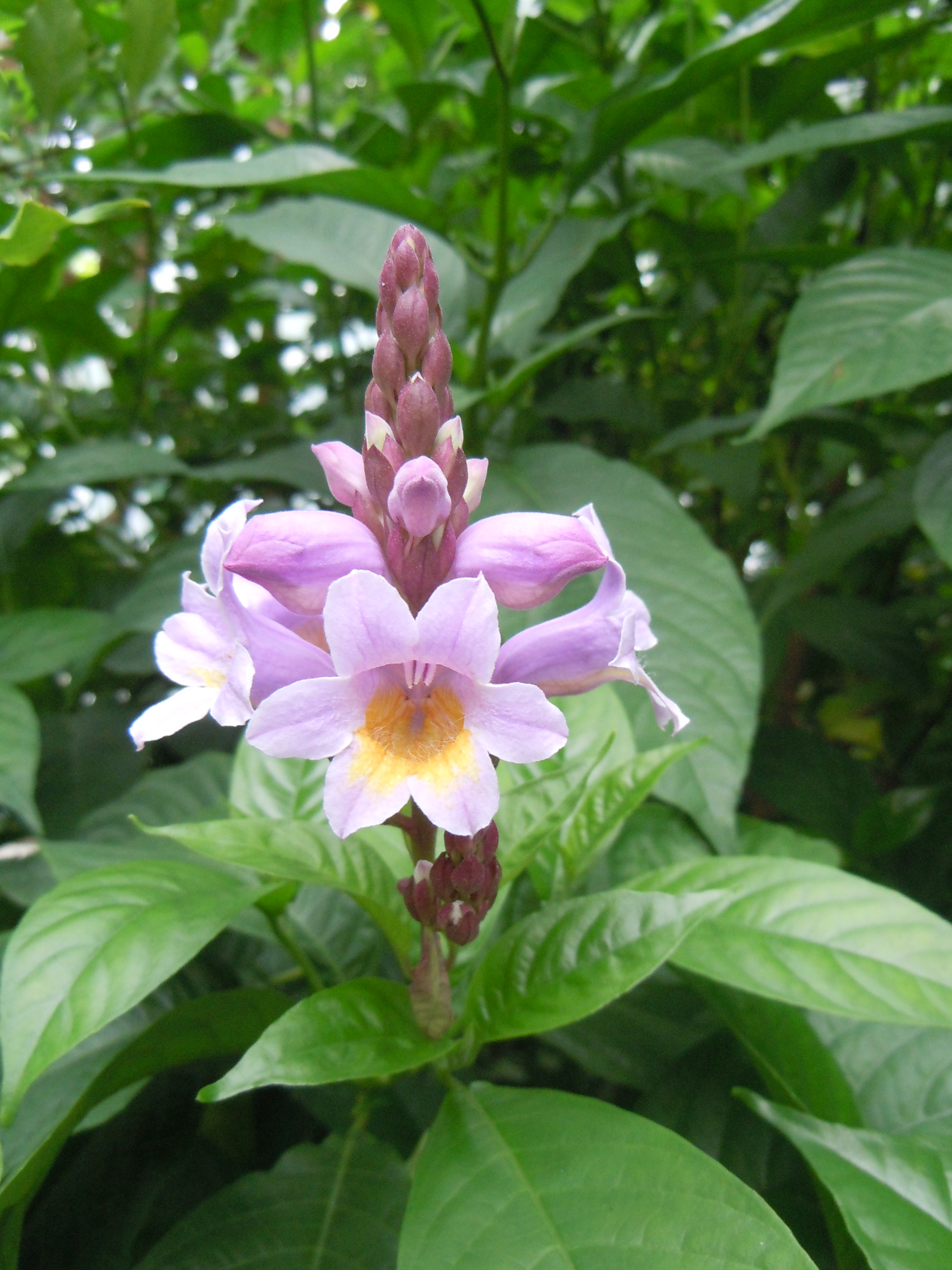
- Phlogacanthus turgidus

Scientific classification
- Kingdom: Plantae
- Clade: Tracheophytes
- Clade: Angiosperms
- Clade: Eudicots
- Clade: Asterids
- Order: Lamiales
- Family: Acanthaceae
- Subfamily: Acanthoideae
- Tribe: Andrographideae
- Genus: Phlogacanthus; Nees (1832)

Synonyms
- Cystacanthus T.Anderson (1867); Diotacanthus Benth. (1876); Janasia Raf. (1838); Loxanthus Nees (1832); Meninia Fua ex Hook.f. (1873)

= Phlogacanthus =

Genus of flowering plants

Phlogacanthus is a genus of flowering plants in the family Acanthaceae and tribe Andrographideae. Its distribution includes India through to Indo-China, southern China, Java, and Sulawesi.

== Species ==
Plants of the World Online currently recognises more than 40 species:

- Phlogacanthus abbreviatus (Craib) Benoist
- Phlogacanthus albiflorus Bedd.
- Phlogacanthus annamensis Benoist
- Phlogacanthus brevis C.B.Clarke
- Phlogacanthus celebicus Backer ex Bremek.
- Phlogacanthus changlangensis P.Lungphi, A.V.Singh & A.P.Das
- Phlogacanthus colaniae Benoist
- Phlogacanthus cornutus Benoist
- Phlogacanthus curviflorus (Nees) Nees
- Phlogacanthus cymosus (T.Anderson) Kurz
- Phlogacanthus datii (Benoist) D.V.Hai, Y.F.Deng & R.K.Choudhary
- Phlogacanthus elongatus T.Anderson
- Phlogacanthus fuscus Lindau
- Phlogacanthus geoffrayi Benoist
- Phlogacanthus gomezii (Nees) J.R.I.Wood
- Phlogacanthus gracilis P.Anderson ex Burkill
- Phlogacanthus grandis Bedd.
- Phlogacanthus guttatus Nees
- Phlogacanthus insignis Kurz
- Phlogacanthus jenkinsii C.B.Clarke
- Phlogacanthus kjellbergii Bremek.
- Phlogacanthus lambertii Raizada
- Phlogacanthus magnus (C.B.Clarke) Y.F.Deng
- Phlogacanthus murtonii Craib
- Phlogacanthus paniculatus (T.Anderson) J.B.Imlay
- Phlogacanthus parviflorus T.Anderson
- Phlogacanthus pauciflorus J.B.Imlay
- Phlogacanthus pedunculatus J.B.Imlay
- Phlogacanthus pochinii Raizada
- Phlogacanthus poilanei Benoist
- Phlogacanthus prostratus J.B.Imlay
- Phlogacanthus pubinervius T.Anderson
- Phlogacanthus publiflorus Lindau
- Phlogacanthus pulcherrimus T.Anderson
- Phlogacanthus pyramidalis Benoist
- Phlogacanthus racemosus Bremek.
- Phlogacanthus rectiflorus J.B.Imlay
- Phlogacanthus thyrsiformis (Roxb. ex Hardw.) Mabb.
- Phlogacanthus tubiflorus Nees
- Phlogacanthus turgidus (Fua ex Hook.f.) Lindau
- Phlogacanthus vitellinus (Roxb.) T.Anderson
- Phlogacanthus yangtsekiangensis (H.Lév.) C.Xia & Y.F.Deng

== Gallery ==
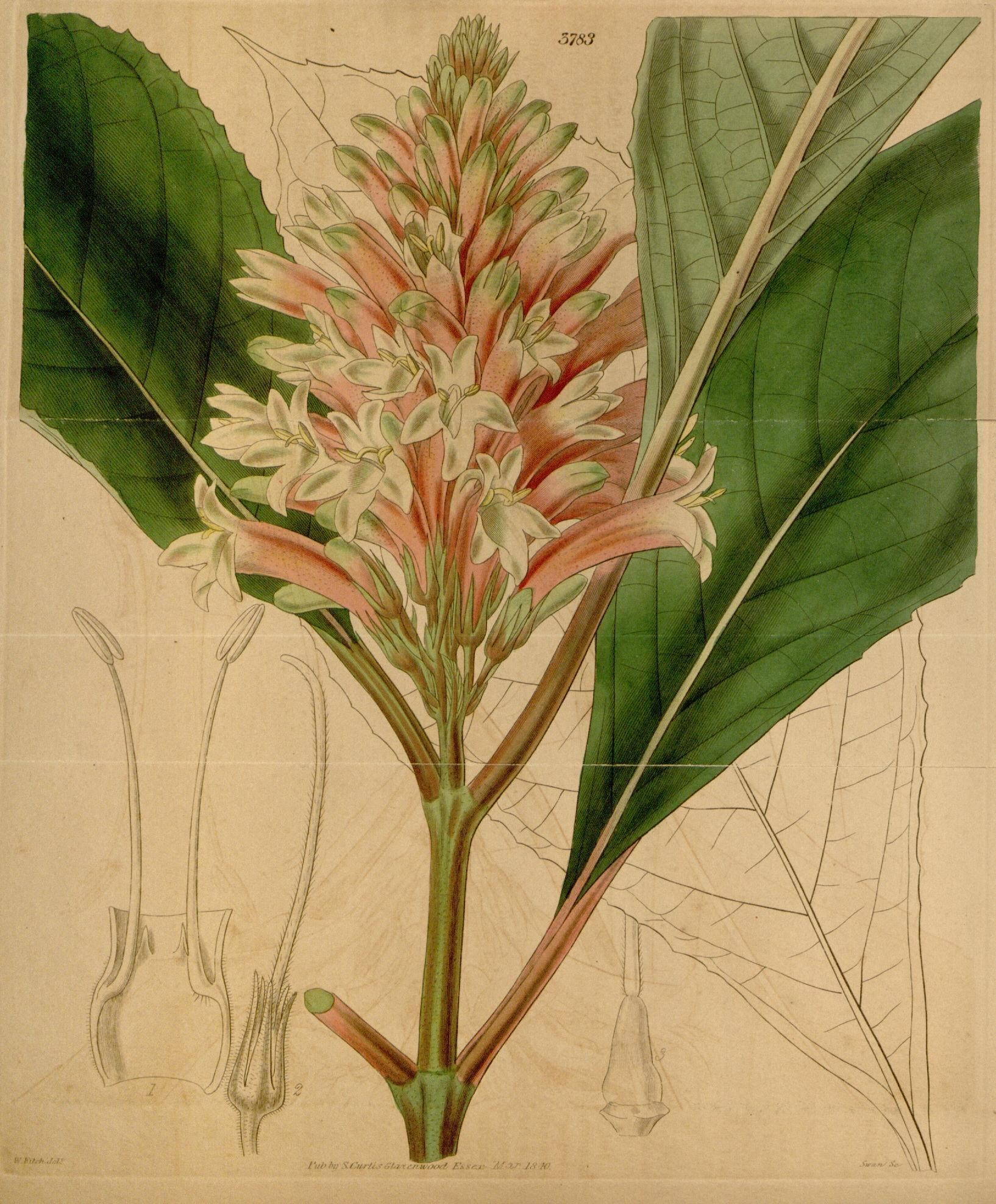
Phlogacanthus curviflorus

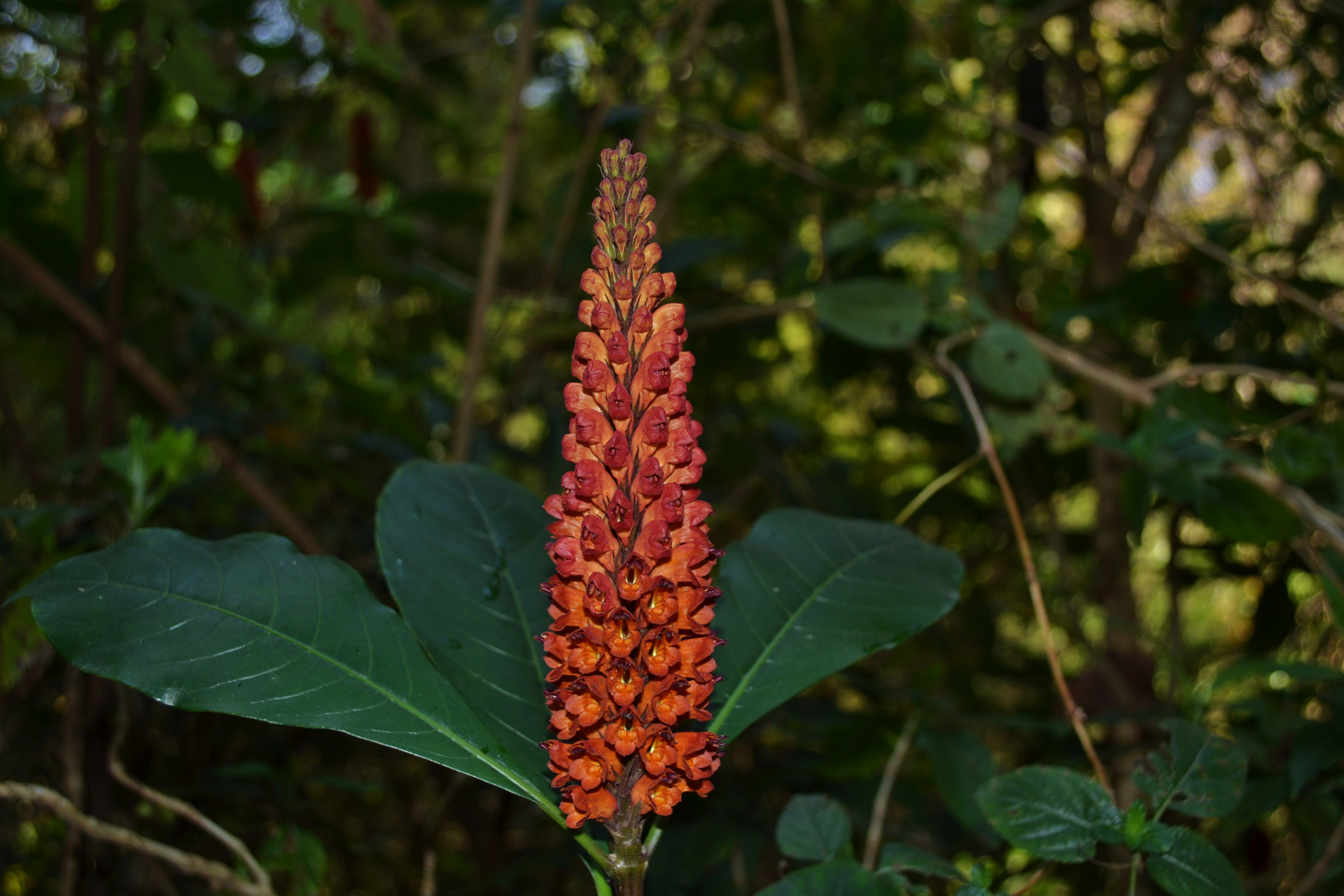
P. pubinervius

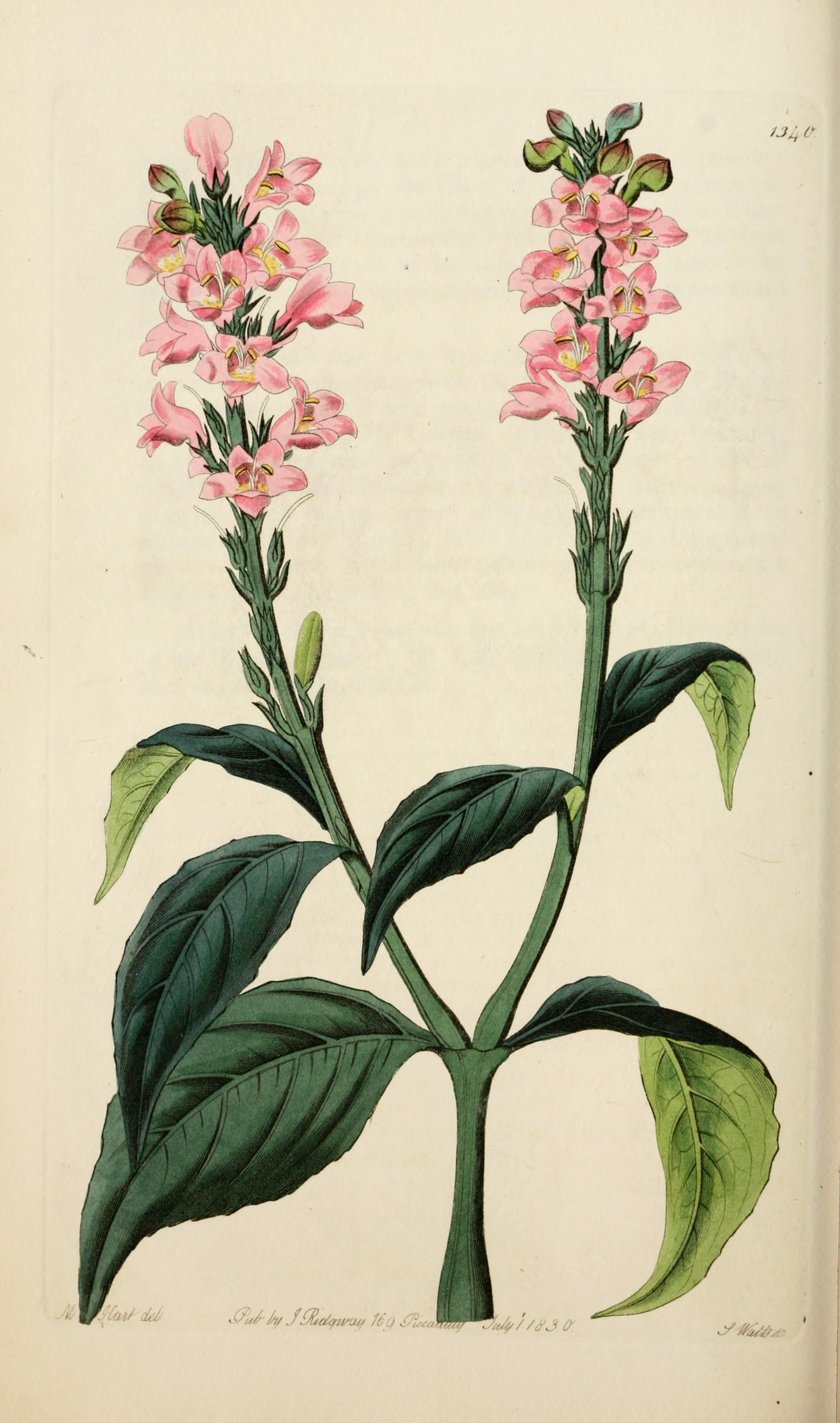
"P. quadrangularis" (synonym of P. vitellinus)

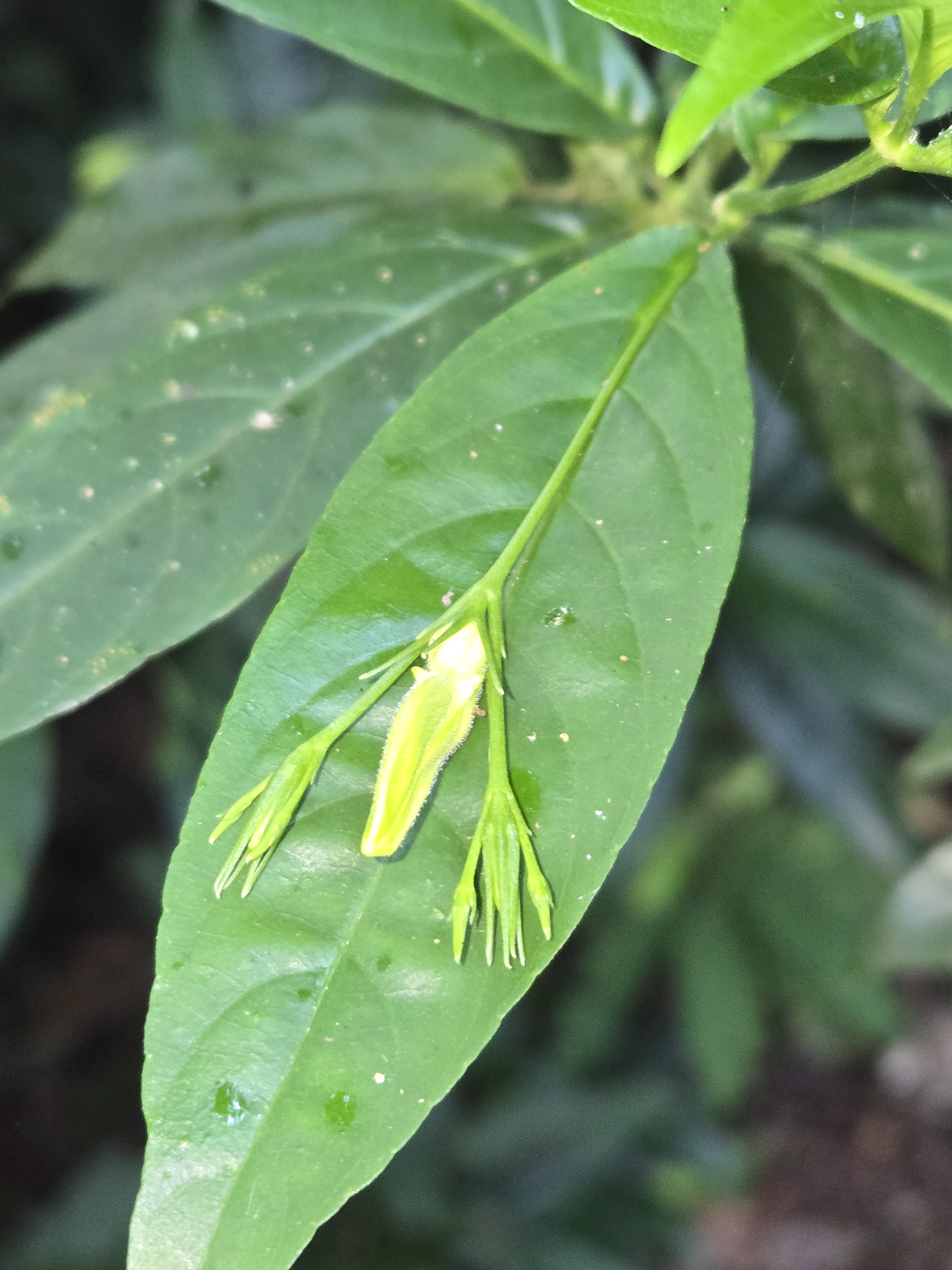
Phlogacanthus albiflorus
