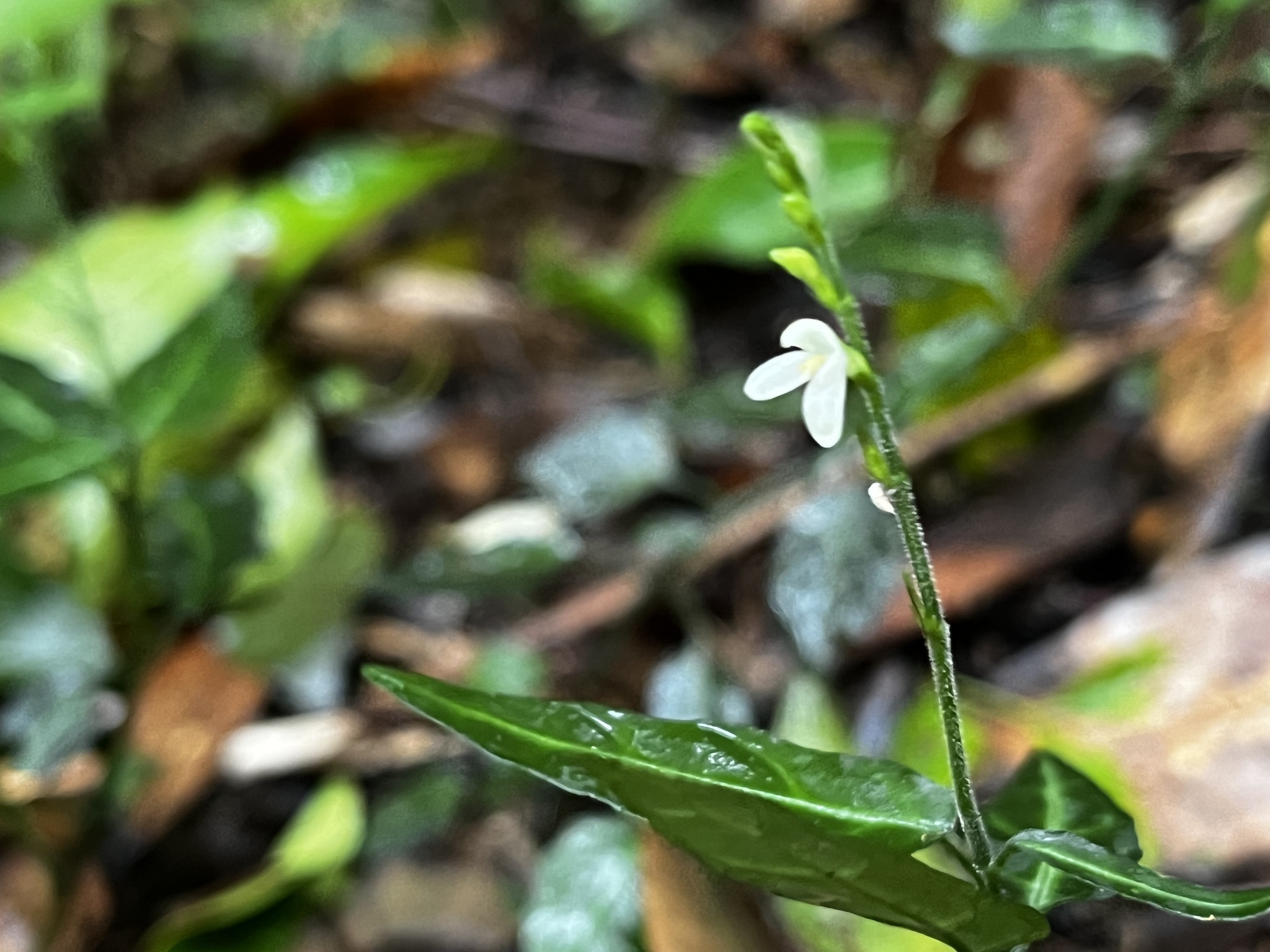

Conservation status
- Endangered (IUCN 3.1)

Scientific classification
- Kingdom: Plantae
- Clade: Tracheophytes
- Clade: Angiosperms
- Clade: Eudicots
- Clade: Asterids
- Order: Lamiales
- Family: Acanthaceae
- Subfamily: Acanthoideae
- Genus: Kudoacanthus; Hosok. (1933)
- Species: K. albonervosus

Binomial name
- Kudoacanthus albonervosus Hosok. (1933)

= Kudoacanthus =

Kudoacanthus albonervosus

Genus of flowering plants

Kudoacanthus is a genus of plants in the family Acanthaceae. It contains a single species, Kudoacanthus albonervosus. It is a subshrub endemic to Taiwan.

When published, the species epithet was written as "albo-nervosa", however, this was later corrected to a consistent genitive ending.
