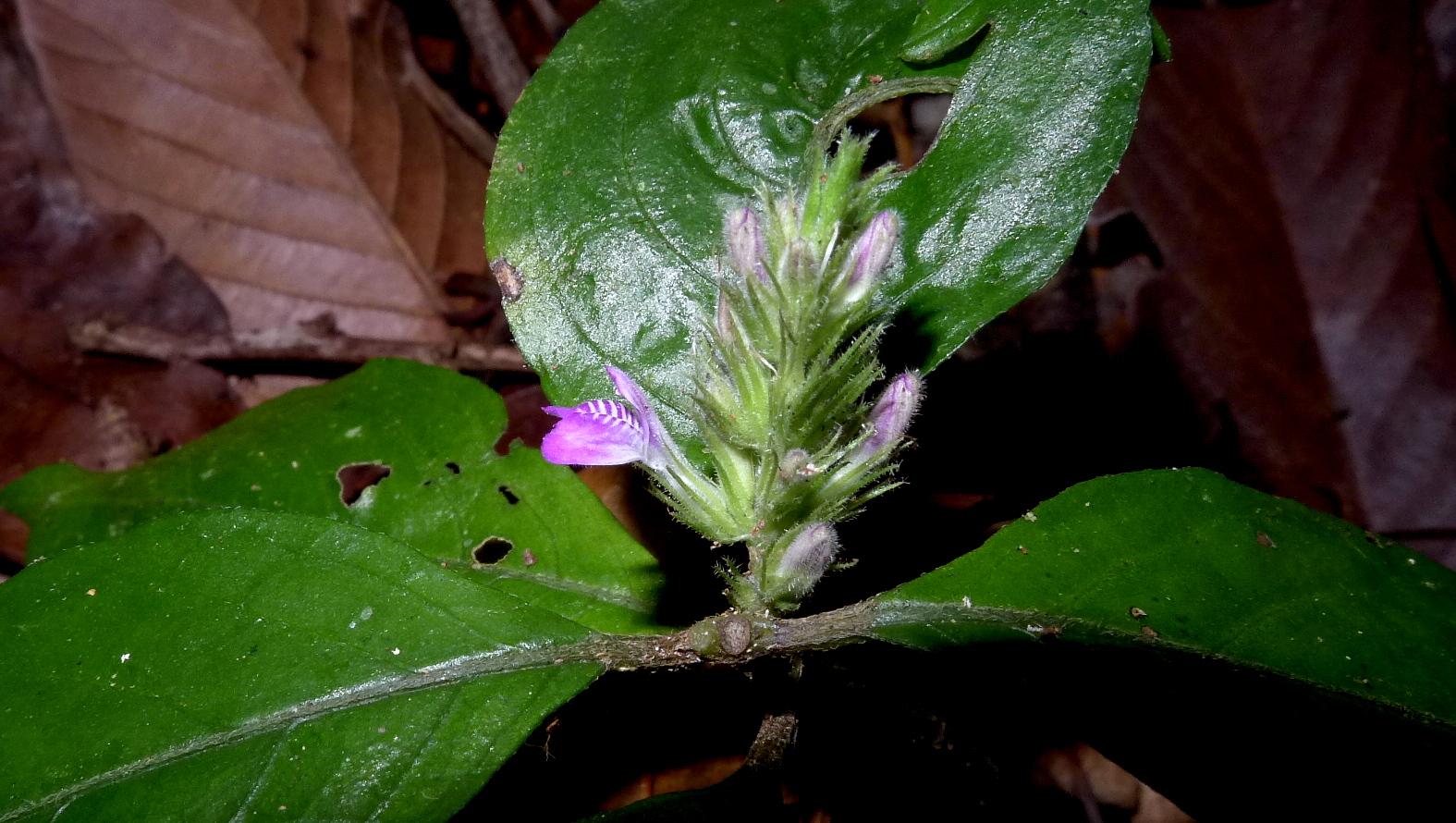
- Schaueria hirsuta from Bahia, Brazil

Scientific classification
- Kingdom: Plantae
- Clade: Tracheophytes
- Clade: Angiosperms
- Clade: Eudicots
- Clade: Asterids
- Order: Lamiales
- Family: Acanthaceae
- Subfamily: Acanthoideae
- Tribe: Justicieae
- Genus: Schaueria; Nees (1839), nom. cons.

Type species
- Schaueria calytricha (Link ex Nees) Orb.

Species
- 15; see text

Synonyms
- Flavicoma Raf. (1838)

= Schaueria =

Genus of flowering plants

Schaueria is a genus of flowering plants in the family Acanthaceae. They are endemic to Brazil, from Bahia to Rio Grande do Sul. They are characterized by small elongated white or yellow flowers and narrow to thread-like green or yellow bracts. They are found mainly in rain forests, semi-deciduous mountain forests, and restingas. They are pollinated by bees and hummingbirds.

The genus was established by the German naturalist Christian Gottfried Daniel Nees von Esenbeck in 1838. It is considered monophyletic and includes 14 or 15 species.

== Species ==
15 species are accepted.

- Schaueria calytricha (Link ex Nees) Orb. (synonym Schaueria calycotricha (Link & Otto) Nees)
- Schaueria capitata Nees
- Schaueria gonatistachya (Nees & Mart.) Nees
- Schaueria hirta A.L.A.Côrtes
- Schaueria humuliflora (Nees & Mart.) Nees
- Schaueria lachnostachya Nees
- Schaueria litoralis (Vell.) A.L.A.Côrtes
- Schaueria macrophylla Nees
- Schaueria marginata Nees
- Schaueria maximiliani Nees
- Schaueria paranaensis (Rizzini) A.L.A.Côrtes
- Schaueria pyramidalis A.L.A.Côrtes
- Schaueria spicata (Vell.) A.L.A.Côrtes
- Schaueria sulfurea Nees
- Schaueria thyrsiflora A.L.A.Côrtes

== See also ==
- Justicia
