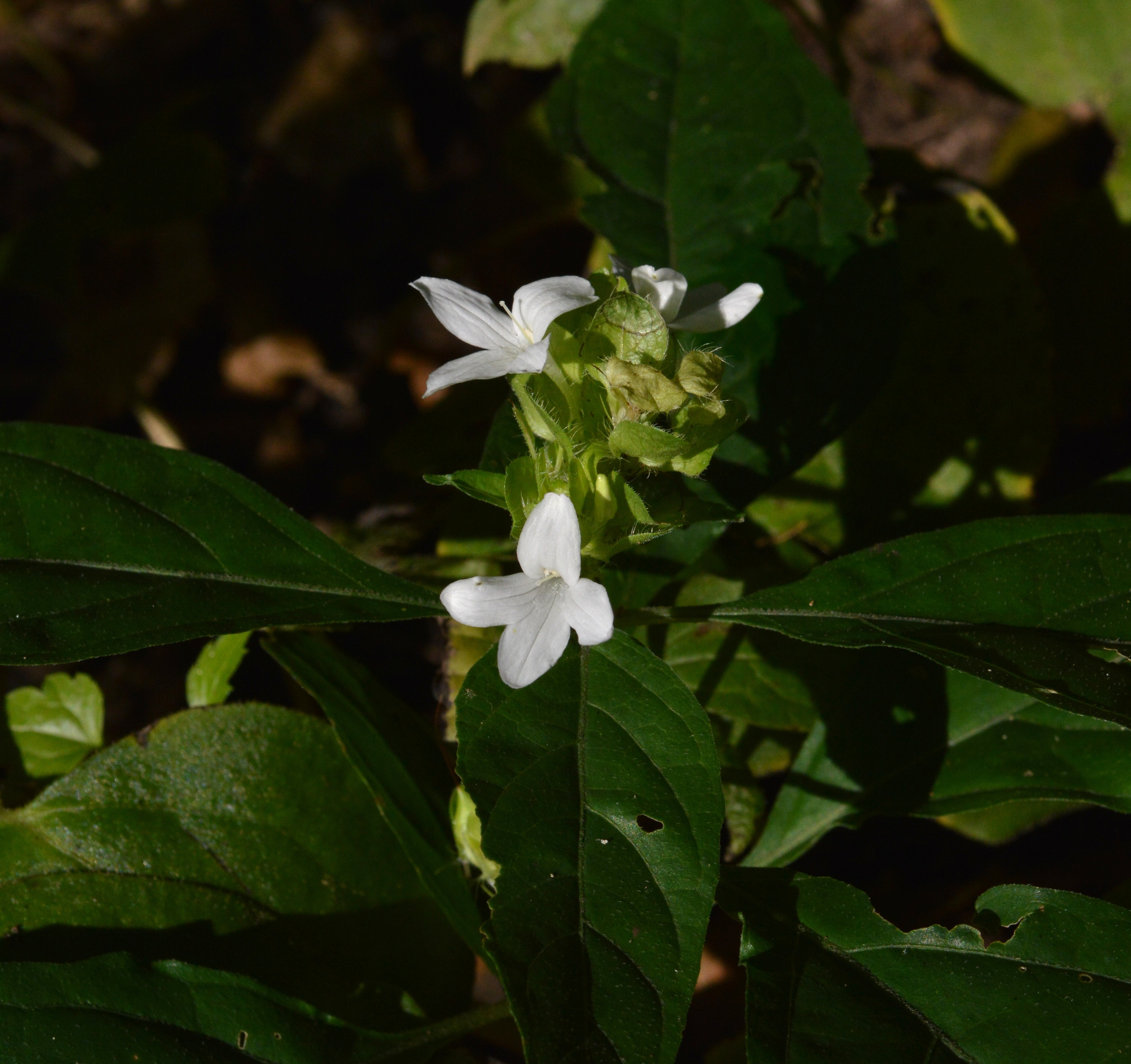
- Yeatesia viridiflora

Scientific classification
- Kingdom: Plantae
- Clade: Embryophytes
- Clade: Tracheophytes
- Clade: Angiosperms
- Clade: Eudicots
- Clade: Asterids
- Order: Lamiales
- Family: Acanthaceae
- Subfamily: Acanthoideae
- Tribe: Justicieae
- Genus: Yeatesia; Small (1896)

Species
- See text

Synonyms
- Gatesia A.Gray (1878), nom. illeg.

= Yeatesia =

Genus of flowering plants

Yeatesia is a putative genus of flowering plants in the family Acanthaceae, found in northeast Mexico and the southeast United States, from Texas to Florida. Each of its species grows in very different habitats; Yeatesia mabryi is found in hardwood forests in Mexico, Y. platystegia prefers semiarid scrublands in Mexico and Texas, and Y. viridiflora grows in wetter forest bluffs and along water courses in US Gulf Coast states. Molecular evidence shows that Yeatesia is not a monophyletic genus.

== Species ==
Currently accepted species include:

- Yeatesia mabryi Hilsenb.
- Yeatesia platystegia (Torr.) Hilsenb.
- Yeatesia viridiflora (Nees) Small
