= Ancistranthus =

Scientific classification
- Kingdom: Plantae
- Clade: Tracheophytes
- Clade: Angiosperms
- Clade: Eudicots
- Clade: Asterids
- Order: Lamiales
- Family: Acanthaceae
- Tribe: Justicieae
- Genus: Ancistranthus; Lindau (1900)
- Species: A. harpochiloides

Binomial name
- Ancistranthus harpochiloides (Griseb.) Lindau (1900)

Synonyms
- Dianthera harpochiloides Griseb. (1866); Jacobinia harpochiloides (Griseb.) M.Gómez (1893)

Genus of flowering plants

Ancistranthus harpochiloides is a species of eudicots belonging to the family Acanthaceae. It is a subshrub endemic to Cuba. It is the sole species in genus Ancistranthus.
