= Sapphoa =

Scientific classification
- Kingdom: Plantae
- Clade: Embryophytes
- Clade: Tracheophytes
- Clade: Angiosperms
- Clade: Eudicots
- Clade: Asterids
- Order: Lamiales
- Family: Acanthaceae
- Subfamily: Acanthoideae
- Tribe: Justicieae
- Genus: Sapphoa; Urb.

Species
- See text

Genus of flowering plants

Sapphoa is a genus of flowering plants in the family Acanthaceae, native to Cuba. Adapted to serpentine soils, they are nickel hyperaccumulators.

== Species ==
Currently accepted species include:

- Sapphoa ekmanii Borhidi
- Sapphoa rigidifolia Urb.
