= Aphanosperma =

Scientific classification
- Kingdom: Plantae
- Clade: Tracheophytes
- Clade: Angiosperms
- Clade: Eudicots
- Clade: Asterids
- Order: Lamiales
- Family: Acanthaceae
- Subfamily: Acanthoideae
- Tribe: Justicieae
- Genus: Aphanosperma; T.F.Daniel
- Species: A. sinaloensis

Binomial name
- Aphanosperma sinaloensis (Leonard & Gentry) T.F.Daniel

Genus of flowering plants

Aphanosperma is genus of flowering plant in the family Acanthaceae containing a single species, Aphanosperma sinaloensis. It is endemic to Mexico. The species is self-compatible and autogamous.
