= Tessmanniacanthus =

Scientific classification
- Kingdom: Plantae
- Clade: Tracheophytes
- Clade: Angiosperms
- Clade: Eudicots
- Clade: Asterids
- Order: Lamiales
- Family: Acanthaceae
- Genus: Tessmanniacanthus; Mildbr. (1926)
- Species: T. chlamydocardioides

Binomial name
- Tessmanniacanthus chlamydocardioides Mildbr. (1926)

Species of flowering plant

Tessmanniacanthus is a monotypic genus of flowering plants belonging to the family Acanthaceae. It only contains one known species, Tessmanniacanthus chlamydocardioides Mildbr.

It is native to Peru.

The genus name of Tessmanniacanthus is partly in honour of Günther Tessmann (1884–1969), a German-Brazilian ethnologist and botanist. He was also an African explorer and plant collector, who later settled in Brazil. The second part of the name refers to Acanthus. The Latin specific epithet of chlamydocardioides refers to the resemblance of its inflorescence bracts to those of Chlamydocardia buettneri.

Both the species and the genus were first described and published in Notizbl. Bot. Gart. Berlin-Dahlem Vol.9 on page 987 in 1926.
