= Filetia =

Scientific classification
- Kingdom: Plantae
- Clade: Tracheophytes
- Clade: Angiosperms
- Clade: Eudicots
- Clade: Asterids
- Order: Lamiales
- Family: Acanthaceae
- Subfamily: Acanthoideae
- Tribe: Justicieae
- Genus: Filetia; Miq.

Species
- See text

Genus of flowering plants

Filetia hirta (Acanthaceae)

Filetia is a genus of flowering plants in the acanthus family (Acanthaceae), found in west Malesia (Sundaland). It is named for Dutch Army physician G.J. Filet, 1825–1891.

== Species ==
Species currently accepted by The Plant List are as follows:

- Filetia bracteosa C.B.Clarke
- Filetia brookeae Bremek.
- Filetia costulata Miq.
- Filetia glabra Ridl.
- Filetia hirta Ridl.
- Filetia lanceolata Bremek.
- Filetia paniculata C.B.Clarke
- Filetia ridleyi C.B.Clarke
- Filetia scortechinii C.B.Clarke
