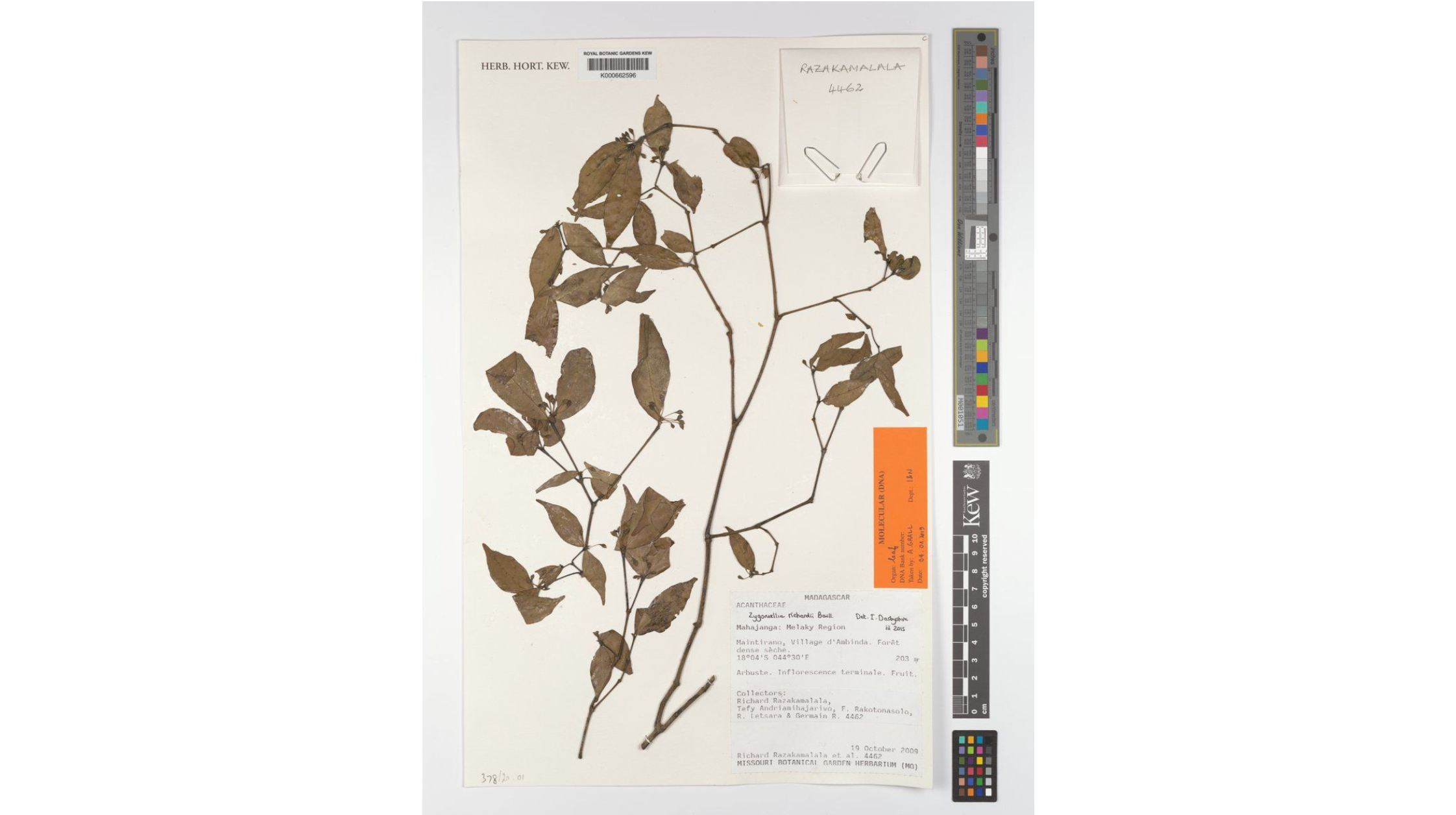

Scientific classification
- Kingdom: Plantae
- Clade: Tracheophytes
- Clade: Angiosperms
- Clade: Eudicots
- Clade: Asterids
- Order: Lamiales
- Family: Acanthaceae
- Subfamily: Acanthoideae
- Tribe: Ruellieae
- Genus: Zygoruellia; Baill. (1890)
- Species: Z. richardii

Binomial name
- Zygoruellia richardii Baill. (1890)

= Zygoruellia =

Genus of flowering plants

Zygoruellia richardii is a species of flowering plant in the family Acanthaceae. It is endemic to Madagascar. The monotypic genus and species were first formally named in 1890 by French botanist Henri Ernest Baillon. It is the only species in the genus Zygoruellia.
