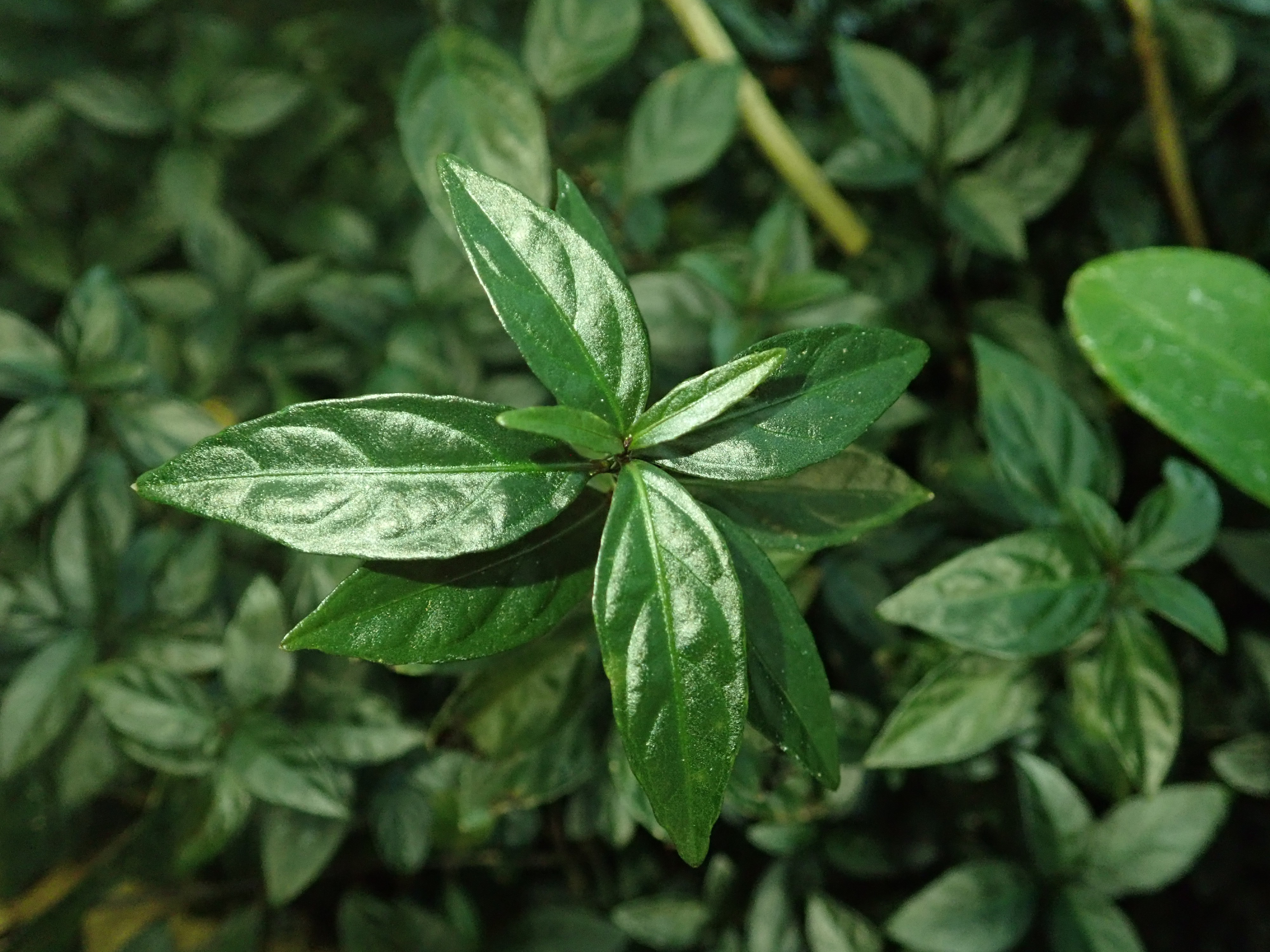
- Hemigraphis repens

Scientific classification
- Kingdom: Plantae
- Clade: Tracheophytes
- Clade: Angiosperms
- Clade: Eudicots
- Clade: Asterids
- Order: Lamiales
- Family: Acanthaceae
- Subfamily: Acanthoideae
- Tribe: Ruellieae
- Genus: Hemigraphis; Nees (1847)

Synonyms
- Gantelbua Bremek. (1944)

= Hemigraphis =

Genus of flowering plants

Hemigraphis is a genus of plants in the family Acanthaceae, consisting of 34 species native to tropical Asia. Hemigraphis is similar to plants the genus Strobilanthes, with some species now placed there. Its native range is Nansei-shoto and from Indo-China to New Guinea.

== Description ==
Hemigraphis is characterized by the greyish-green leaves, sometimes tinged with red-purple colouration. It is a prostrate plant with spreading growth and rooting stems.

== Species ==
Plants of the World Online currently includes:

- Hemigraphis angustifolia Hallier f.
- Hemigraphis banggaiensis Bremek.
- Hemigraphis betonicifolia Bremek.
- Hemigraphis bicolor (Blume) Boerl.
- Hemigraphis blumeana K.Schum.
- Hemigraphis borneensis Hallier f. ex Koord.
- Hemigraphis buruensis Hallier f.
- Hemigraphis caudigera S.Moore
- Hemigraphis dorensis S.Moore
- Hemigraphis flaccida (Kurz) C.B.Clarke
- Hemigraphis humilis Bremek.
- Hemigraphis javanica Bremek.
- Hemigraphis kjellbergii Bremek.
- Hemigraphis lasiophylla Bremek.
- Hemigraphis ledermannii Bremek.
- Hemigraphis lithophila K.Schum. & Lauterb.
- Hemigraphis modesta Benoist
- Hemigraphis moluccana Bremek.
- Hemigraphis okamotoi Masam.
- Hemigraphis palopensis Bremek.
- Hemigraphis parva Bremek.
- Hemigraphis petola Hallier f.
- Hemigraphis prostrata Hallier f.
- Hemigraphis proteus Bremek.
- Hemigraphis ravaccensis (Nees) Boerl.
- Hemigraphis repens Fern.-Vill. – unplaced name (Philippines)
- Hemigraphis rumphii Bremek.
- Hemigraphis sordida K.Schum.
- Hemigraphis stenophylla Hallier f.
- Hemigraphis sumatrensis (Roth) Boerl.
- Hemigraphis trichotoma (Nees) Boerl.
- Hemigraphis turnerifolia Benoist
- Hemigraphis weinlandii K.Schum.
- Hemigraphis wetarensis Bremek.
- Hemigraphis whitei S.Moore
