= Dinteracanthus =

Scientific classification
- Kingdom: Plantae
- Clade: Embryophytes
- Clade: Tracheophytes
- Clade: Spermatophytes
- Clade: Angiosperms
- Clade: Eudicots
- Clade: Asterids
- Order: Lamiales
- Family: Acanthaceae
- Subfamily: Acanthoideae
- Tribe: Ruellieae
- Genus: Dinteracanthus; C.B.Clarke ex Schinz

Genus of flowering plants

Dinteracanthus is a genus of flowering plants belonging to the family Acanthaceae.

Its native range is Angola and Namibia in tropical Africa.

The genus name of Dinteracanthus is in honour of Kurt Dinter (1868–1945), a German botanist and explorer in South West Africa, and Greek term ἄκανθος (akanthos) for Acanthus mollis, a plant that's image was used in Greek architecture. The genus was described in Vierteljahrsschr. Naturf. Ges. Zürich Vol.60 on page 416 in 1915.

It was verified by United States Department of Agriculture and the Agricultural Research Service on 23 January 2009.

Known species:

- Dinteracanthus acetabulus (E.A.Tripp & K.G.Dexter) E.A.Tripp & I.Darbysh.
- Dinteracanthus asper Schinz
- Dinteracanthus diversifolius (S.Moore) E.A.Tripp & I.Darbysh.
- Dinteracanthus kaokoanus (E.A.Tripp & K.G.Dexter) E.A.Tripp & I.Darbysh.
- Dinteracanthus marlothii (Engl.) Schinz
