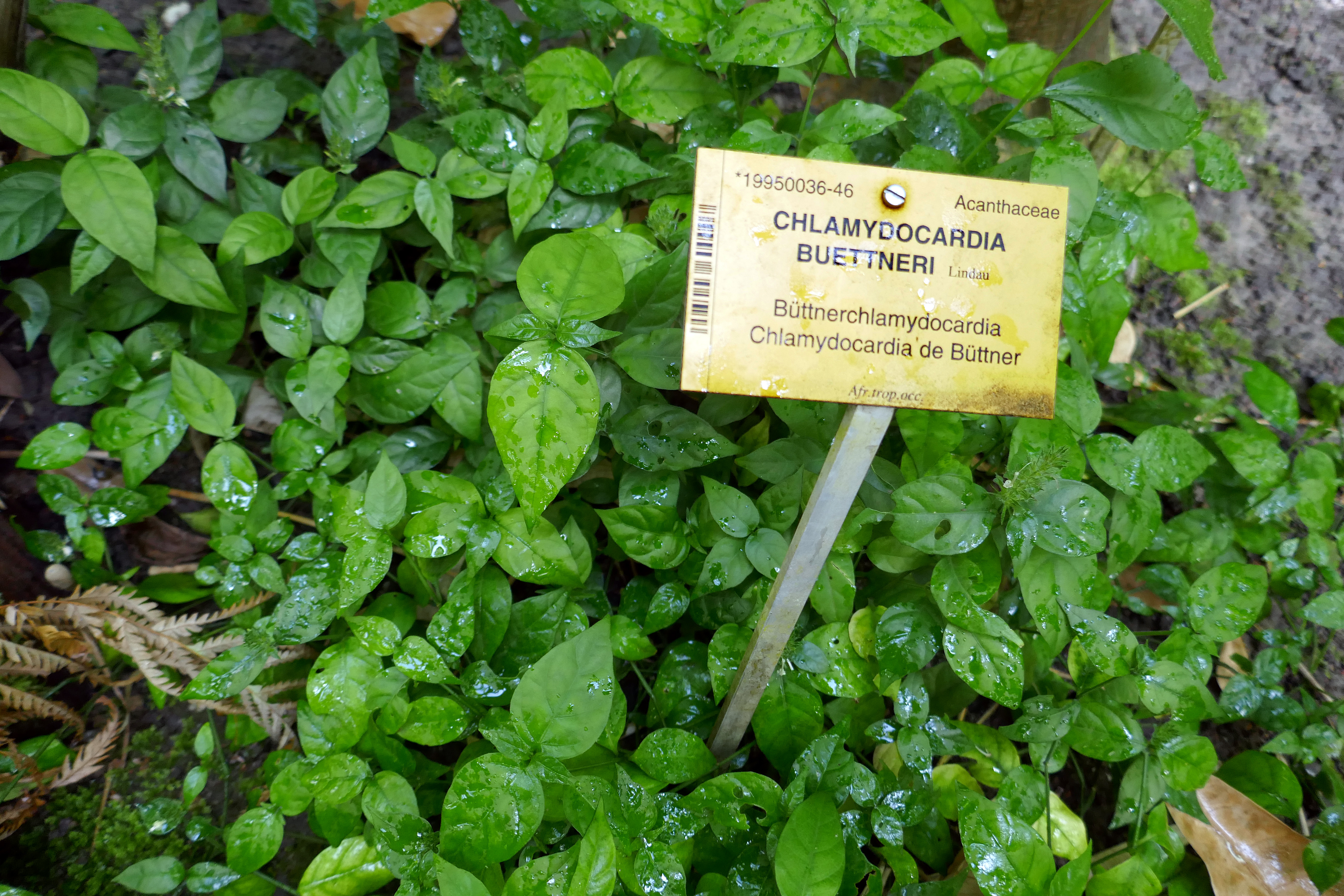
- Chlamydocardia buettneri

Scientific classification
- Kingdom: Plantae
- Clade: Tracheophytes
- Clade: Angiosperms
- Clade: Eudicots
- Clade: Asterids
- Order: Lamiales
- Family: Acanthaceae
- Genus: Chlamydocardia; Lindau

Synonyms
- Linocalix Lindau (1913)

= Chlamydocardia =

Genus of flowering plants

Chlamydocardia is a genus of flowering plants belonging to the family Acanthaceae.

Its native range is western tropical Africa to Uganda.

The genus name of Chlamydocardia is from the Greek word chlamydos meaning cloak or short mantle and also from the Greek kardia meaning heart.

Species:

- Chlamydocardia buettneri Lindau
- Chlamydocardia subrhomboidea Lindau
