= Holographis =

Scientific classification
- Kingdom: Plantae
- Clade: Tracheophytes
- Clade: Angiosperms
- Clade: Eudicots
- Clade: Asterids
- Order: Lamiales
- Family: Acanthaceae
- Genus: Holographis; Nees (1847)

Synonyms
- Berginia Harv. ex Benth. & Hook.f. (1876); Lundellia Leonard (1959); Pringleophytum A.Gray (1885)

Genus of plants

Holographis is a genus of flowering plants belonging to the family Acanthaceae. It includes 18 species native to Mexico. Thomas Franklin Daniel described species in the genus.

Species:

- Holographis anisophylla T.F.Daniel
- Holographis argyrea (Leonard) T.F.Daniel
- Holographis caput-medusae T.F.Daniel
- Holographis ehrenbergiana Nees
- Holographis haenkeana (Nees) T.F.Daniel, McDade & Kiel
- Holographis hintonii (Leonard) T.F.Daniel
- Holographis ilicifolia Brandegee
- Holographis leticiana T.F.Daniel
- Holographis lizethae Cruz & J.Jiménez Ram.
- Holographis pallida Leonard & Gentry
- Holographis parayana Miranda
- Holographis peloria (Leonard) T.F.Daniel
- Holographis pueblensis T.F.Daniel
- Holographis tamaulipica T.F.Daniel
- Holographis tolantongensis T.F.Daniel
- Holographis velutifolia (House) T.F.Daniel
- Holographis virgata (Harv. ex Benth. & Hook.f.) T.F.Daniel
- Holographis websteri T.F.Daniel
