= Duosperma =

Scientific classification
- Kingdom: Plantae
- Clade: Tracheophytes
- Clade: Angiosperms
- Clade: Eudicots
- Clade: Asterids
- Order: Lamiales
- Family: Acanthaceae
- Genus: Duosperma; Dayton (1945)

Synonyms
- Disperma C.B.Clarke (1899), nom. illeg.

Genus of plants

Duosperma is a genus of flowering plants belonging to the family Acanthaceae.

Its native range is Tropical and Southern Africa.

Species:

- Duosperma actinotrichum (Chiov.) Vollesen
- Duosperma clarae Champl.
- Duosperma crenatum (Lindau) P.G.Mey.
- Duosperma cuprinum Brummitt
- Duosperma densiflorum (C.B.Clarke) Brummitt
- Duosperma dichotomum Vollesen
- Duosperma fanshawei Brummitt
- Duosperma fimbriatum Brummitt
- Duosperma glabratum Vollesen
- Duosperma grandiflorum Vollesen
- Duosperma kaessneri (S.Moore) Vollesen & I.Darbysh.
- Duosperma kilimandscharicum (Lindau) Dayton
- Duosperma latifolium Vollesen
- Duosperma livingstoniense Vollesen
- Duosperma longicalyx (Deflers) Vollesen
- Duosperma nudantherum (C.B.Clarke) Brummitt
- Duosperma parviflorum Hedrén & Vollesen
- Duosperma porotoense Vollesen
- Duosperma quadrangulare (Klotzsch) Brummitt
- Duosperma rehmannii (Schinz) Vollesen
- Duosperma sessilifolium (Lindau) Brummitt
- Duosperma stoloniferum Vollesen
- Duosperma subquadrangulare Vollesen
- Duosperma tanzaniense Vollesen
- Duosperma trachyphyllum (Bullock) Dayton
- Duosperma transvaalense (Schinz) Vollesen
