= Boutonia =

Scientific classification
- Kingdom: Plantae
- Clade: Tracheophytes
- Clade: Angiosperms
- Clade: Eudicots
- Clade: Asterids
- Order: Lamiales
- Family: Acanthaceae
- Subfamily: Acanthoideae
- Genus: Boutonia; DC. (1838)
- Species: B. cuspidata

Binomial name
- Boutonia cuspidata DC. (1838)

Synonyms
- Periblema DC. (1839), nom. superfl.; Periblema cuspidata (DC.) A.DC. (1845)

Genus of flowering plants

Boutonia cuspidata is a species of flowering plant endemic to Madagascar. It is the sole species in genus Boutonia.
