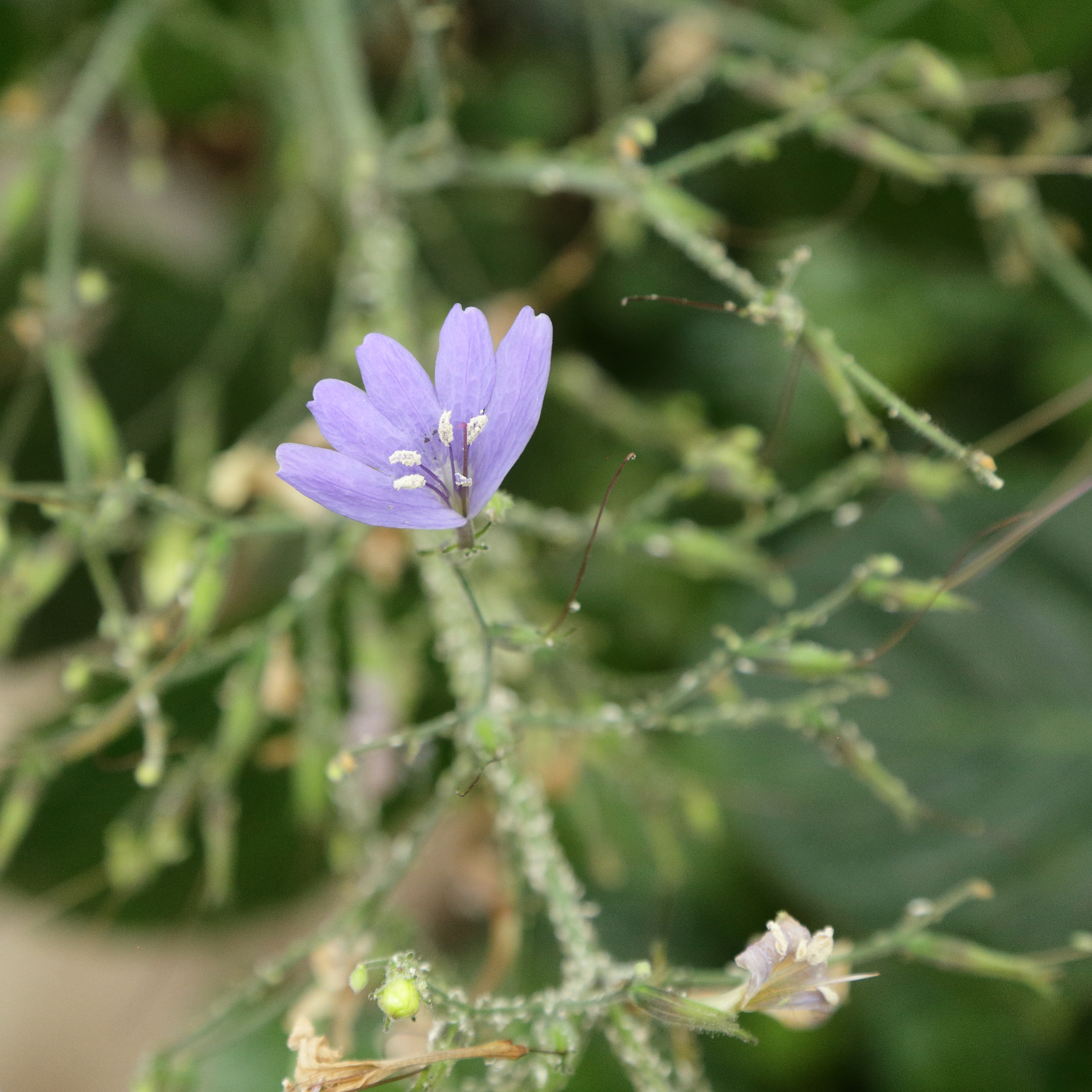

Scientific classification
- Kingdom: Plantae
- Clade: Tracheophytes
- Clade: Angiosperms
- Clade: Eudicots
- Clade: Asterids
- Order: Lamiales
- Family: Acanthaceae
- Genus: Eremomastax; Lindau (1894)
- Species: E. speciosa

Binomial name
- Eremomastax speciosa (Hochst.) Cufod. (1964)

Synonyms
- Paulo-wilhelmia Hochst. (1844), nom. illeg.; Eremomastax crossandriflora Lindau (1894); Eremomastax polysperma (Benth.) Dandy (1956); Paulo-wilhelmia decaryi Benoist (1939); Paulo-wilhelmia elata Lindau (1913); Paulo-wilhelmia glabra Lindau (1895); Paulo-wilhelmia polysperma Benth. (1849); Paulo-wilhelmia pubescens Lindau (1908); Paulo-wilhelmia sclerochiton (S.Moore) Lindau (1893); Paulo-wilhelmia speciosa Hochst. (1844); Paulo-wilhelmia togoensis Lindau (1893); Ruellia sclerochiton S.Moore in J. Bot. 18: 7 (1880)

= Eremomastax =

Genus of plants

Eremomastax speciosa is a species of flowering plant belonging to the family Acanthaceae.It is a subshrub or shrub native to tropical Africa, ranging from Guinea to Ethiopia, Zambia, and Madagascar. It is the sole species in genus Eremomastax.
