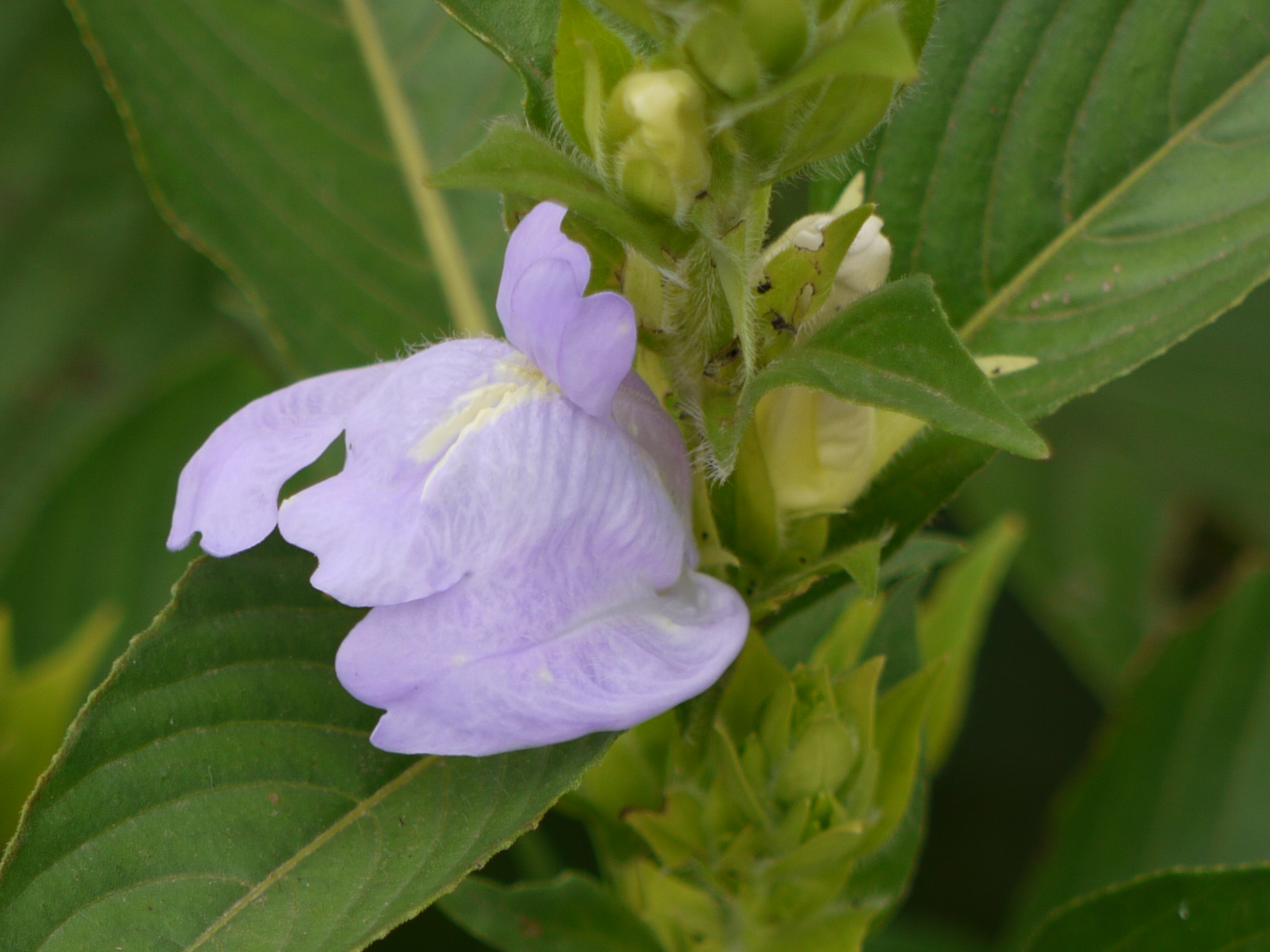

Conservation status
- Near Threatened (IUCN 3.1)

Scientific classification
- Kingdom: Plantae
- Clade: Tracheophytes
- Clade: Angiosperms
- Clade: Eudicots
- Clade: Asterids
- Order: Lamiales
- Family: Acanthaceae
- Genus: Calacanthus; T.Anderson ex Benth. (1876)
- Species: C. grandiflorus

Binomial name
- Calacanthus grandiflorus (Dalzell) Radlk. (1884 publ. 1883)

Synonyms
- Calacanthus dalzellianus T.Anderson ex Benth. & Hook.f. (1876), nom. illeg. Lepidagathis grandiflora Dalzell (1850)

= Calacanthus =

Genus of flowering plants

Calacanthus is a genus of flowering plants belonging to the family Acanthaceae. It contains a single species, Calacanthus grandiflorus. It is endemic to the Western Ghats of western India, in the states Maharashtra, Goa, and Karnataka. It typically grows on moist sunny slopes, including in clumps near streams and on ridge tops, along forest edges, and in shrublands, from 550 to 1,000 metres elevation.
