= Strobilanthopsis =

Scientific classification
- Kingdom: Plantae
- Clade: Tracheophytes
- Clade: Angiosperms
- Clade: Eudicots
- Clade: Asterids
- Order: Lamiales
- Family: Acanthaceae
- Genus: Strobilanthopsis; S.Moore (1900)
- Species: S. linifolia

Binomial name
- Strobilanthopsis linifolia (C.B.Clarke) Milne-Redh. (1932)

Synonyms
- Calophanes linifolius T.Anderson ex C.B.Clarke (1899), not validly publ.; Dyschoriste linifolia C.B.Clarke (1899); Hygrophila evae Briq. (1902); Hygrophila glutinifolia Lindau (1903); Strobilanthopsis glutinifolia S.Moore (1911); Strobilanthopsis hircina S.Moore (1900); Strobilanthopsis prostrata Milne-Redh. (1932); Strobilanthopsis rogersii S.Moore (1913)

Genus of plants

Strobilanthopsis linifolia is a species of flowering plant belonging to the family Acanthaceae. It is a perennial or shrub native to the southern Democratic Republic of the Congo and Malawi, Zambia, Zimbabwe, and Angola. It is the sole species in genus Strobilianthopsis.
