= Chorisochora =

Scientific classification
- Kingdom: Plantae
- Clade: Embryophytes
- Clade: Tracheophytes
- Clade: Spermatophytes
- Clade: Angiosperms
- Clade: Eudicots
- Clade: Asterids
- Order: Lamiales
- Family: Acanthaceae
- Genus: Chorisochora; Vollesen

Genus of flowering plants

Chorisochora is a genus of flowering plants belonging to the family Acanthaceae.

Its native range is Socotra, Southern Africa.

Species:

- Chorisochora chascanoides Thulin & I.Darbysh.
- Chorisochora minor (Balf.f.) Vollesen
- Chorisochora striata (Balf.f.) Vollesen
- Chorisochora transvaalensis (A.Meeuse) Vollesen
