= Dischistocalyx =

Scientific classification
- Kingdom: Plantae
- Clade: Tracheophytes
- Clade: Angiosperms
- Clade: Eudicots
- Clade: Asterids
- Order: Lamiales
- Family: Acanthaceae
- Genus: Dischistocalyx; T.Anderson ex Benth.

Genus of plants

Dischistocalyx is a genus of flowering plants belonging to the family Acanthaceae.

Its native range is Southern Nigeria to Western Central Tropical Africa.

Species:

- Dischistocalyx alternifolius Champl. & Lejoly
- Dischistocalyx champluvieranus Lejoly & Lisowski
- Dischistocalyx epiphytica Lindau
- Dischistocalyx grandifolius C.B.Clarke
- Dischistocalyx hirsutus C.B.Clarke
- Dischistocalyx klainei Benoist
- Dischistocalyx lithicola Champl. & Ngok
- Dischistocalyx minimus Champl. & Senterre
- Dischistocalyx obanensis S.Moore
- Dischistocalyx rivularis Bremek.
- Dischistocalyx strobilinus C.B.Clarke
- Dischistocalyx thunbergiiflora (T.Anderson) T.Anderson ex B.D.Jacks.
