= Meiosperma =

Scientific classification
- Kingdom: Plantae
- Clade: Tracheophytes
- Clade: Angiosperms
- Clade: Eudicots
- Clade: Asterids
- Order: Lamiales
- Family: Acanthaceae
- Genus: Meiosperma; Raf. (1838)

Synonyms
- Monechma Hochst. (1841)

Genus of flowering plants

Meiosperma is a genus of flowering plants in family Acanthaceae. It includes six species native to tropical Africa, the Arabian Peninsula, and India.

- Meiosperma bracteatum (Hochst.) I.Darbysh. & E.A.Tripp
- Meiosperma carnosum (Hedrén) I.Darbysh. & E.A.Tripp
- Meiosperma debile (Forssk.) I.Darbysh. & E.A.Tripp
- Meiosperma eminii (Lindau) I.Darbysh. & E.A.Tripp
- Meiosperma monechmoides (S.Moore) I.Darbysh. & E.A.Tripp
- Meiosperma tetrasperma (Hedrén) I.Darbysh. & E.A.Tripp
