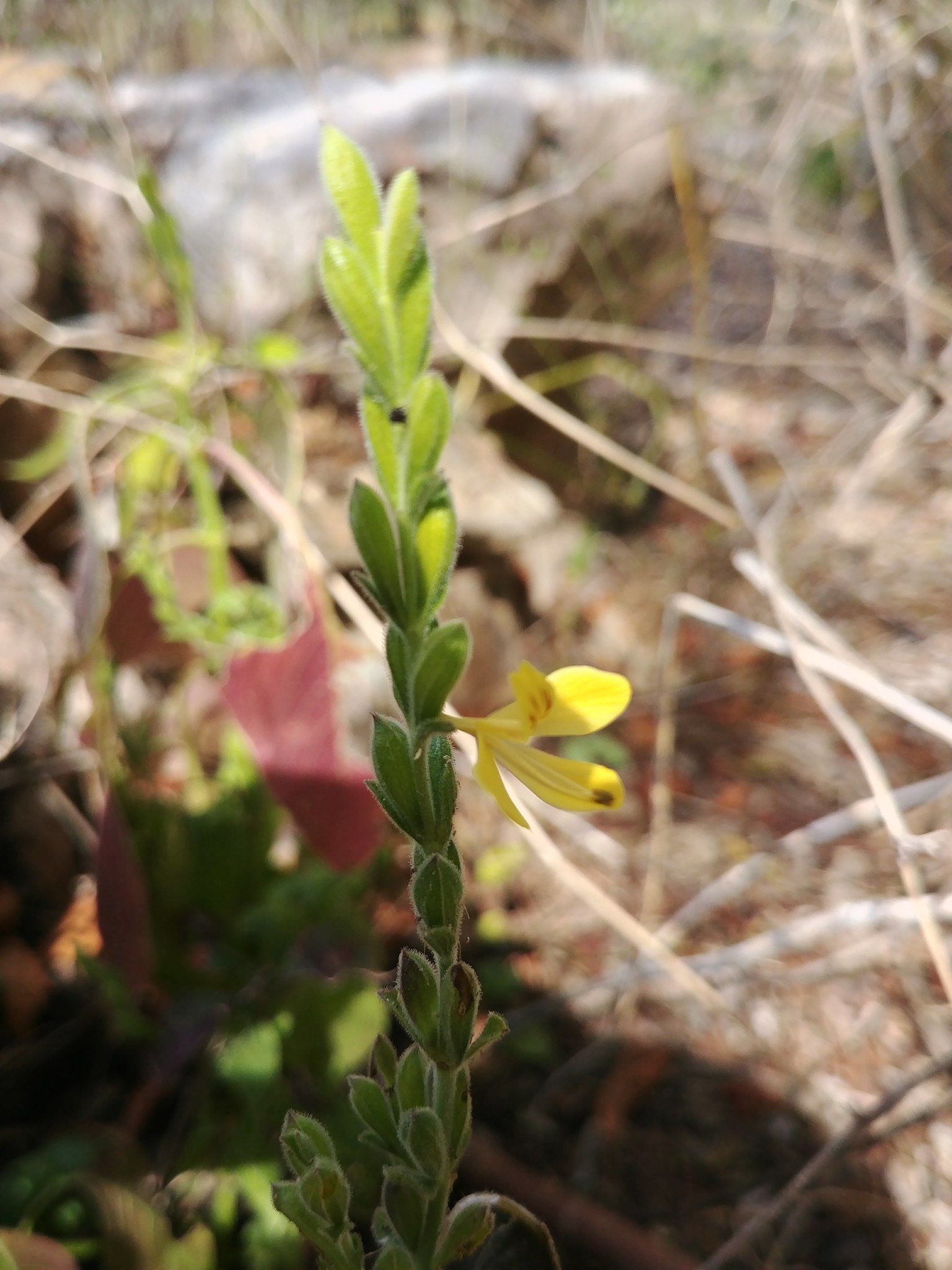
- Henrya insularis

Scientific classification
- Kingdom: Plantae
- Clade: Embryophytes
- Clade: Tracheophytes
- Clade: Spermatophytes
- Clade: Angiosperms
- Clade: Eudicots
- Clade: Asterids
- Order: Lamiales
- Family: Acanthaceae
- Subfamily: Acanthoideae
- Tribe: Justicieae
- Genus: Henrya; Nees

Synonyms
- Baillonacanthus Kuntze; Solenoruellia Baill.

= Henrya (plant) =

Genus of plants

Henrya is a genus of flowering plants belonging to the family Acanthaceae.

Its native range is Arizona to Central America. It is found in the countries of Costa Rica, El Salvador, Guatemala, Honduras, Mexico, Nicaragua and Panama.

The genus name of Henrya is in honour of Aimé Constant Fidèle Henry (1801–1875), a French-born German bookseller in Bonn and member of the German National Academy of Sciences Leopoldina. It was first described and published in G.Bentham, Bot. Voy. Sulphur on page 148 in 1846.

Known species, according to Kew:

- Henrya insularis Nees
- Henrya scorpioides (L.) Nees
- Henrya tuberculosperma T.F.Daniel
