= Mellera =

Scientific classification
- Kingdom: Plantae
- Clade: Tracheophytes
- Clade: Angiosperms
- Clade: Eudicots
- Clade: Asterids
- Order: Lamiales
- Family: Acanthaceae
- Genus: Mellera; S.Moore (1879)

Synonyms
- Ionacanthus Benoist (1940); Onus Gilli (1970)

Genus of plants

Mellera is a genus of flowering plants belonging to the family Acanthaceae.

Its native range is Ethiopia to southern Tropical Africa and Madagascar.

== Species ==
Seven species are accepted:

- Mellera briartii De Wild. & T.Durand
- Mellera congdonii Vollesen
- Mellera insignis Vollesen
- Mellera lobulata S.Moore
- Mellera menthiodora Lindau
- Mellera nyassana S.Moore
- Mellera submutica C.B.Clarke
