= Conocalyx =

Scientific classification
- Kingdom: Plantae
- Clade: Tracheophytes
- Clade: Angiosperms
- Clade: Eudicots
- Clade: Asterids
- Order: Lamiales
- Family: Acanthaceae
- Genus: Conocalyx; Benoist (1967)
- Species: C. laxus

Binomial name
- Conocalyx laxus Benoist (1967)

Genus of flowering plants

Conocalyx laxus is a species of flowering plants belonging to the family Acanthaceae. It is endemic to Madagascar. It is the sole species in genus Conocalyx.
