= Mirandea =

Scientific classification
- Kingdom: Plantae
- Clade: Tracheophytes
- Clade: Angiosperms
- Clade: Eudicots
- Clade: Asterids
- Order: Lamiales
- Family: Acanthaceae
- Genus: Mirandea; Rzed. (1959)

Genus of plants

Mirandea is a genus of flowering plants belonging to the family Acanthaceae.

It is native to Mexico.

The genus name of Mirandea is in honour of Faustino Miranda Gonzalez (1905–1964), a Spanish-born Mexican botanist. It was first described and published in Ciencia (Mexico) Vol.19 on page 80 in 1959.

== Species ==
According to Kew:

- Mirandea andradenia T.F.Daniel
- Mirandea grisea Rzed.
- Mirandea huastecensis T.F.Daniel
- Mirandea hyssopus (Nees) T.F.Daniel
- Mirandea nutans (Nees) T.F.Daniel
- Mirandea sylvatica Acosta
