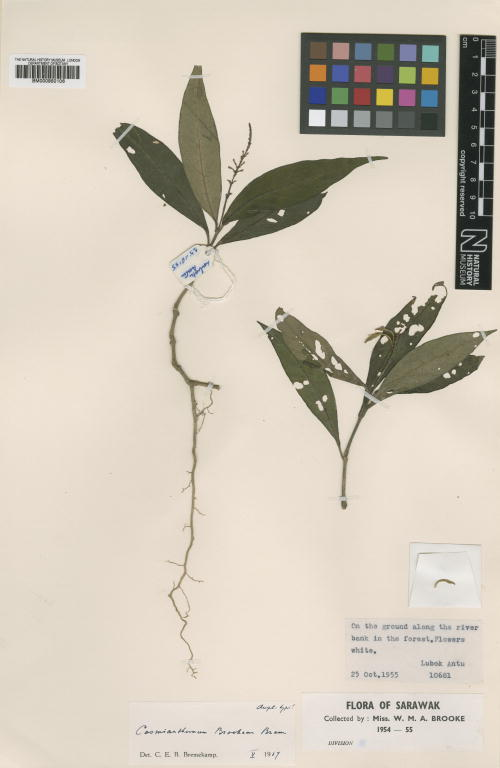
- Cosmianthemum brookeae

Scientific classification
- Kingdom: Plantae
- Clade: Tracheophytes
- Clade: Angiosperms
- Clade: Eudicots
- Clade: Asterids
- Order: Lamiales
- Family: Acanthaceae
- Genus: Cosmianthemum; Bremek. (1960)

= Cosmianthemum =

Genus of flowering plants

Cosmianthemum is a genus of flowering plants belonging to the family Acanthaceae.

Its native range is southeastern China, Hainan, Vietnam, Thailand, Peninsular Malaysia, and Borneo.

== Species ==
14 species are accepted.

- Cosmianthemum angustifolium Bremek.
- Cosmianthemum anomalum B.L.Burtt & R.M.Sm.
- Cosmianthemum brookeae Bremek.
- Cosmianthemum bullatum (N.E.Br.) B.L.Burtt & R.M.Sm.
- Cosmianthemum dido B.L.Burtt & R.M.Sm.
- Cosmianthemum guangxiense H.S.Lo & D.Fang
- Cosmianthemum knoxiifolium (C.B.Clarke) B.Hansen
- Cosmianthemum latifolium Bremek.
- Cosmianthemum magnifolium Bremek.
- Cosmianthemum melinhense D.V.Hai, Z.L.Lin & Y.F.Deng
- Cosmianthemum obtusifolium Bremek.
- Cosmianthemum punctulatum Bremek.
- Cosmianthemum subglabrum Bremek.
- Cosmianthemum viriduliflorum (C.Y.Wu & H.S.Lo) H.S.Lo
