= Trichaulax mwasumbii =

Scientific classification
- Kingdom: Plantae
- Clade: Tracheophytes
- Clade: Angiosperms
- Clade: Eudicots
- Clade: Asterids
- Order: Lamiales
- Family: Acanthaceae
- Tribe: Justicieae
- Genus: Trichaulax; Vollesen (1992)
- Species: T. mwasumbii

Binomial name
- Trichaulax mwasumbii Vollesen (1992)

Species of flowering plant

Trichaulax mwasumbii is a species of flowering plant belonging to the family Acanthaceae. It is a subshrub native to Kenya and Tanzania. It is the sole species in genus Trichaulax.
