= Dasytropis =

Scientific classification
- Kingdom: Plantae
- Clade: Tracheophytes
- Clade: Angiosperms
- Clade: Eudicots
- Clade: Asterids
- Order: Lamiales
- Family: Acanthaceae
- Genus: Dasytropis; Urb. (1924)
- Species: D. fragilis

Binomial name
- Dasytropis fragilis Urb. (1924)

Genus of flowering plant

Dasytropis fragilis is a species of flowering plant belonging to the family Acanthaceae. It is a climbing shrub native to the Sierra de Nipe in eastern Cuba. It is the sole species in genus Dasytropis.
