= Hulemacanthus =

Scientific classification
- Kingdom: Plantae
- Clade: Tracheophytes
- Clade: Angiosperms
- Clade: Eudicots
- Clade: Asterids
- Order: Lamiales
- Family: Acanthaceae
- Genus: Hulemacanthus; S.Moore (1920)

Genus of plants

Hulemacanthus is a genus of flowering plants belonging to the family Acanthaceae. It includes two species endemic to New Guinea.

Species:

- Hulemacanthus novoguineensis (Lindau) Bremek.
- Hulemacanthus whitei S.Moore
