= Borneacanthus =

Scientific classification
- Kingdom: Plantae
- Clade: Tracheophytes
- Clade: Angiosperms
- Clade: Eudicots
- Clade: Asterids
- Order: Lamiales
- Family: Acanthaceae
- Genus: Borneacanthus; Bremek. (1960)

Genus of flowering plants

Borneacanthus is a genus of flowering plants belonging to the family Acanthaceae.

Its native range is Borneo.

Species:

- Borneacanthus angustifolius Bremek.
- Borneacanthus grandifolius Bremek.
- Borneacanthus mesargyreus (Hallier f.) Bremek.
- Borneacanthus paniculatus Bremek.
- Borneacanthus parvus Bremek.
- Borneacanthus stenothyrsus Bremek.
