= Barleriola =

Scientific classification
- Kingdom: Plantae
- Clade: Tracheophytes
- Clade: Angiosperms
- Clade: Eudicots
- Clade: Asterids
- Order: Lamiales
- Family: Acanthaceae
- Genus: Barleriola; Oerst.

Genus of flowering plants

Barleriola is a genus of flowering plants belonging to the family Acanthaceae.

Its native range is Northern Caribbean.

Species:

- Barleriola inermis Urb. & Ekman
- Barleriola multiflora Urb. & Ekman
- Barleriola saturejoides (Griseb.) M.Gómez
- Barleriola solanifolia (L.) Oerst. ex Lindau
