= Chroesthes =

Scientific classification
- Kingdom: Plantae
- Clade: Tracheophytes
- Clade: Angiosperms
- Clade: Eudicots
- Clade: Asterids
- Order: Lamiales
- Family: Acanthaceae
- Genus: Chroesthes; Benoist

Genus of flowering plants

Chroesthes is a genus of flowering plants belonging to the family Acanthaceae.

Its native range is Southern China, Indo-China, and Peninsular Malaysia.

Species:

- Chroesthes bracteata (Imlay) B.Hansen
- Chroesthes faizaltahiriana Siti-Munirah
- Chroesthes lanceolata (T.Anderson) B.Hansen
- Chroesthes longifolia (Wight) B.Hansen
