= Lasiocladus =

Scientific classification
- Kingdom: Plantae
- Clade: Tracheophytes
- Clade: Angiosperms
- Clade: Eudicots
- Clade: Asterids
- Order: Lamiales
- Family: Acanthaceae
- Genus: Lasiocladus; Bojer ex Nees (1847)

Synonyms
- Synchoriste Baill. (1891)

Genus of plants

Lasiocladus is a genus of flowering plants belonging to the family Acanthaceae.

Its native range is Madagascar.

Species:

- Lasiocladus anthospermifolius Bojer ex Nees
- Lasiocladus capuronii Benoist
- Lasiocladus rufopilus (Baill.) Benoist
- Lasiocladus villosus Benoist
