= Pseudodicliptera =

Scientific classification
- Kingdom: Plantae
- Clade: Tracheophytes
- Clade: Angiosperms
- Clade: Eudicots
- Clade: Asterids
- Order: Lamiales
- Family: Acanthaceae
- Genus: Pseudodicliptera; Benoist (1939)

Synonyms
- Delphinacanthus Benoist (1948 publ. 1949)

Genus of plants

Pseudodicliptera is a genus of flowering plants belonging to the family Acanthaceae. It includes four species endemic to Madagascar.

== Species ==
Four species are accepted.

- Pseudodicliptera coursii Benoist
- Pseudodicliptera humilis Benoist
- Pseudodicliptera longifolia (Benoist) Benoist
- Pseudodicliptera sulfureolilacina Benoist
