= Gustav Lindau =

German mycologist and botanist (1866–1923)

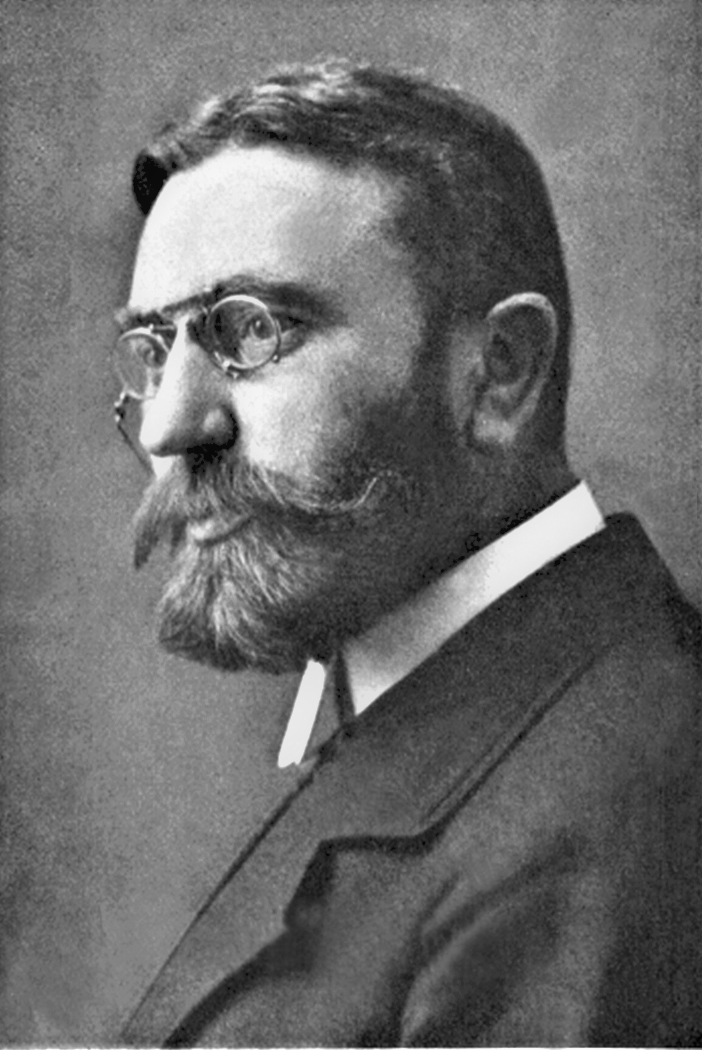
Gustav Lindau in 1915

Gustav Lindau (2 May 1866 in Dessau – 10 October 1923 in Berlin), was a German mycologist and botanist.

== Biography ==
Gustav Lindau was born on 2 May 1866 in Dessau (Saxony-Anhalt, Germany). He studied natural history in Heidelberg and Berlin, where he studied under Simon Schwendener (1829–1919). He completed his doctoral thesis on the apothecia of lichens in 1888. In 1890, he became director at the botanical garden in Münster and an assistant to Julius Oscar Brefeld (1839–1925).

In 1892, he became an assistant at the Berlin botanical garden. He obtained his habilitation in 1894, and became a professor in 1902. He has been credited for having introduced the term "plechtenchyma" to refer to fungal tissue in an 1899 publication, which he proposed could be further adapted for specific tissue types by adding prefixes such as "para-" and "proso-".

Lindau died in Berlin on 10 October 1923. His entire collection of herbarium specimens and documents, stored in Berlin, was lost during the 1943 bombing raids.

== Recognition ==
The genus Lindauea (Acanthaceae) was named in his honor by Rendle, (it is now a synonym of Lepidagathis Willd.), and the fungi genus Lindauella was named after him by Heinrich Rehm in 1900. The fungus genus Lindauomyces, named by Koorders in 1907, is now a synonym of Arthrobotryum Ces.

== Works ==
Lindau contributed to nearly 40 publications, predominantly based on specimens collected from exotic locations during expeditions, which he later analyzed at the Berlin Museum.

- Gustav Lindau and Paul Sydow: Thesaurus literaturae mycologicae et lichenologicae. (1908–1917, 5 volumes)
- Gustav Lindau: Kryptogamenflora für Anfanger ("Cryptogam flora for Beginners"). (1911–1914, 6 volumes)

== Literature ==
- Heinrich Dörfelt (ed.):Encyclopedia of mycology. Gustav Fischer Verlag, Stuttgart, New York, 1989. ISBN 3-437-20413-0
- Zander, R. in Dictionary of Plant Names ed. 13, Ulmer Verlag, Stuttgart,1984. ISBN 3-8001-5042-5))

== See also ==
- Category:Taxa named by Gustav Lindau

== Note ==
Based in part on the translation from the German Wikipedia.
