= Xylacanthus =

Xylacanthus may refer to:

- Xylacanthus (fish), a genus of fossil Acanthodii in the family Ischnacanthidae
- Xylacanthus (plant), a genus of flowering plants in the family Acanthaceae
