= Vindasia =

Scientific classification
- Kingdom: Plantae
- Clade: Tracheophytes
- Clade: Angiosperms
- Clade: Eudicots
- Clade: Asterids
- Order: Lamiales
- Family: Acanthaceae
- Genus: Vindasia; Benoist (1962)
- Species: V. virgata

Binomial name
- Vindasia virgata Benoist (1962)

Genus of flowering plants

Vindasia virgata is a species of flowering plant belonging to the family Acanthaceae. It is endemic to Madagascar. It is the sole species in genus Vindasia.
