= Morsacanthus =

Scientific classification
- Kingdom: Plantae
- Clade: Tracheophytes
- Clade: Angiosperms
- Clade: Eudicots
- Clade: Asterids
- Order: Lamiales
- Family: Acanthaceae
- Genus: Morsacanthus; Rizzini
- Species: M. nemoralis

Binomial name
- Morsacanthus nemoralis Rizzini

Species of flowering plant

Morsacanthus is a monotypic genus of flowering plants belonging to the family Acanthaceae. The only species is Morsacanthus nemoralis Rizzini.

It is native to southern Brazil.

The genus name of Morsacanthus is in honour of Walter Baptist Mors (1920–2008), a Brazilian chemist who researched useful plants. The Latin specific epithet of nemoralis means coming from the forest. Both genus and species were first described and published in Revista Brasil. Biol. Vol.12 on page 261 in 1952.
