= Cuenotia =

Scientific classification
- Kingdom: Plantae
- Clade: Tracheophytes
- Clade: Angiosperms
- Clade: Eudicots
- Clade: Asterids
- Order: Lamiales
- Family: Acanthaceae
- Genus: Cuenotia; Rizzini (1956)
- Species: C. speciosa

Binomial name
- Cuenotia speciosa Rizzini (1956)

Genus of flowering plants

Cuenotia speciosa is a species of flowering plant belonging to the family Acanthaceae. It is endemic to Pernambuco in northeastern Brazil
