= Physacanthus =

Scientific classification
- Kingdom: Plantae
- Clade: Tracheophytes
- Clade: Angiosperms
- Clade: Eudicots
- Clade: Asterids
- Order: Lamiales
- Family: Acanthaceae
- Genus: Physacanthus; Benth.

Genus of plants

Physacanthus is a genus of flowering plants belonging to the family Acanthaceae.

Its native range is Western and Western Central Tropical Africa.

== Species ==
Species:

- Physacanthus batanganus (J.Braun & K.Schum.) Lindau
- Physacanthus nematosiphon (Lindau) Rendle & Britten
- Physacanthus talbotii S.Moore
