= Wuacanthus =

Scientific classification
- Kingdom: Plantae
- Clade: Tracheophytes
- Clade: Angiosperms
- Clade: Eudicots
- Clade: Asterids
- Order: Lamiales
- Family: Acanthaceae
- Genus: Wuacanthus; Y.F.Deng, N.H.Xia & H.Peng (2016)
- Species: W. microdontus

Binomial name
- Wuacanthus microdontus (W.W.Sm.) Y.F.Deng, N.H.Xia & H.Peng (2016)

Synonyms
- Justicia microdonta W.W.Sm. (1918); Mananthes microdonta (W.W.Sm.) C.Y.Wu & C.C.Hu (2002)

Genus of flowering plants

Wuacanthus microdontus is a species of flowering plant belonging to the family Acanthaceae. It is a shrub native to Yunnan and southern Sichuan in south-central China. It is the sole species in genus Wuacanthus.
