= Heteradelphia =

Scientific classification
- Kingdom: Plantae
- Clade: Tracheophytes
- Clade: Angiosperms
- Clade: Eudicots
- Clade: Asterids
- Order: Lamiales
- Family: Acanthaceae
- Genus: Heteradelphia; Lindau (1893)

Genus of plants

Heteradelphia is a genus of flowering plants belonging to the family Acanthaceae. It includes two species native to Guinea, Côte d'Ivoire, and Nigeria in western tropical Africa and to São Tomé in the Gulf of Guinea Islands.

Species:

- Heteradelphia paulojaegeria Heine – Guinea, Côte d'Ivoire, and Nigeria
- Heteradelphia paulowilhelmia Lindau – São Tomé
