= Aymoreana =

Scientific classification
- Kingdom: Plantae
- Clade: Tracheophytes
- Clade: Angiosperms
- Clade: Eudicots
- Clade: Asterids
- Order: Lamiales
- Family: Acanthaceae
- Genus: Aymoreana; Braz, T.F.Daniel & Kiel (2021)
- Species: A. nitida

Binomial name
- Aymoreana nitida (S.Moore) Braz, T.F.Daniel & Kiel (2021)

Synonyms
- Ebermaiera nitida S.Moore (1879); Staurogyne carvalhoi Profice (2000); Staurogyne nitida (S.Moore) Braz & T.F.Daniel (2018)

Genus of flowering plant

Aymoreana nitida is a species of flowering plant in the family Acanthaceae. It is native to Bahia and Espírito Santo states in eastern Brazil. It is the sole species in genus Aymoreana.

The species was first described as Ebermaiera nitida by Spencer Le Marchant Moore in 1879. In 2021 it was placed in the new monotypic genus Aymoreana by Braz, T.F.Daniel & Kiel.
