= Pseudacanthopale =

Scientific classification
- Kingdom: Plantae
- Clade: Tracheophytes
- Clade: Angiosperms
- Clade: Eudicots
- Clade: Asterids
- Order: Lamiales
- Family: Acanthaceae
- Genus: Pseudacanthopale; Benoist (1950)
- Species: P. castroi

Binomial name
- Pseudacanthopale castroi Benoist (1950)

Genus of flowering plants

Pseudacanthopale castroi is a species of flowering plant in the family Acanthaceae. It is endemic to Mozambique. It is the sole species in genus Pseudacanthopale.
