= Polylychnis =

Scientific classification
- Kingdom: Plantae
- Clade: Tracheophytes
- Clade: Angiosperms
- Clade: Eudicots
- Clade: Asterids
- Order: Lamiales
- Family: Acanthaceae
- Genus: Polylychnis; Bremek. (1938)
- Species: P. radicans

Binomial name
- Polylychnis radicans (Nees) Wassh. (2006)

Synonyms
- Polylychnis essequibensis Bremek. (1948); Ruellia radicans (Nees) Lindau (1895), nom. illeg.; Stemonacanthus radicans Nees (1847)

Genus of flowering plants

Polylychnis radicans is a species of flowering plant belonging to the family Acanthaceae. It is native to Guyana and French Guiana. It is the sole species in genus Polylychnis.
