= Marcania =

Scientific classification
- Kingdom: Plantae
- Clade: Tracheophytes
- Clade: Angiosperms
- Clade: Eudicots
- Clade: Asterids
- Order: Lamiales
- Family: Acanthaceae
- Genus: Marcania; J.B.Imlay (1939)
- Species: M. grandiflora

Binomial name
- Marcania grandiflora J.B.Imlay (1939)

Genus of plants

Marcania is a monotypic genus of flowering plants belonging to the family Acanthaceae. It only contains one known species, Marcania grandiflora J.B.Imlay

It is native to Thailand within Indo-China.

The genus name of Marcania is in honour of Alexander Marcan (1883–1953), an English collector of plants in south-east Asia and Thailand. The Latin specific epithet of grandiflora refers 2 two words, 'grandi' meaning large and 'flora' meaning flower. Both the genus and species were first described and published in Bull. Misc. Inform. Kew 1939 on page 136 in 1939.
