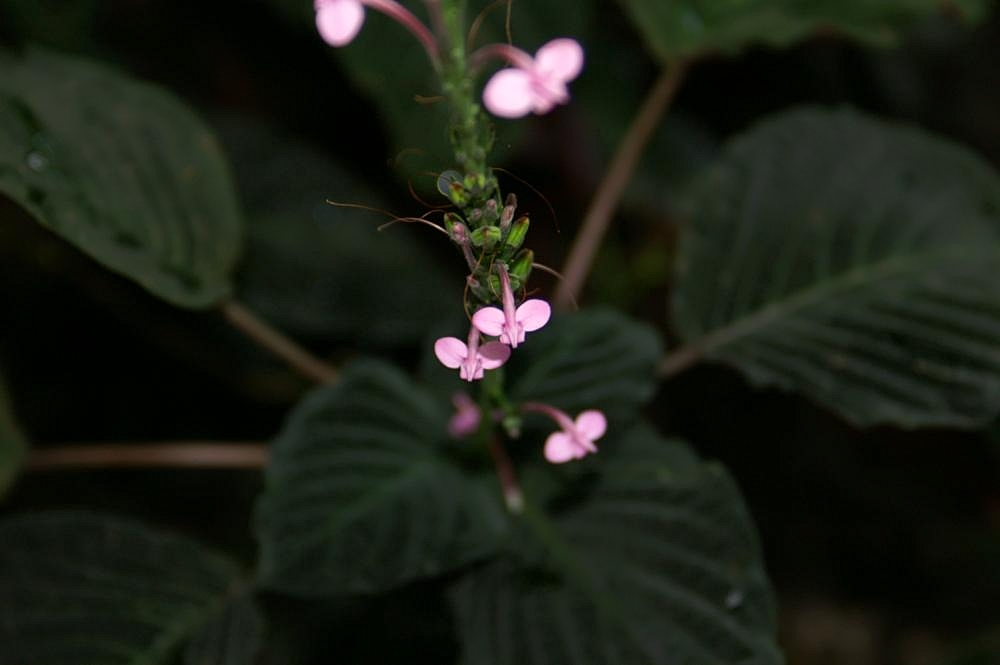
- Sciaphyllum Amoenum

Scientific classification
- Kingdom: Plantae
- Clade: Tracheophytes
- Clade: Angiosperms
- Clade: Eudicots
- Clade: Asterids
- Order: Lamiales
- Family: Acanthaceae
- Genus: Streblacanthus; Kuntze (1891)

Synonyms
- Sciaphyllum Bremek. (1940)

= Streblacanthus =

Genus of plants

Streblacanthus is a genus of flowering plants belonging to the family Acanthaceae.

Its native range is Southern Mexico to Central America, Peru to Northern Brazil.

== Species ==
Three species are accepted.

- Streblacanthus amoenus (Bremek.) T.F.Daniel
- Streblacanthus monospermus Kuntze
- Streblacanthus parviflorus Leonard
