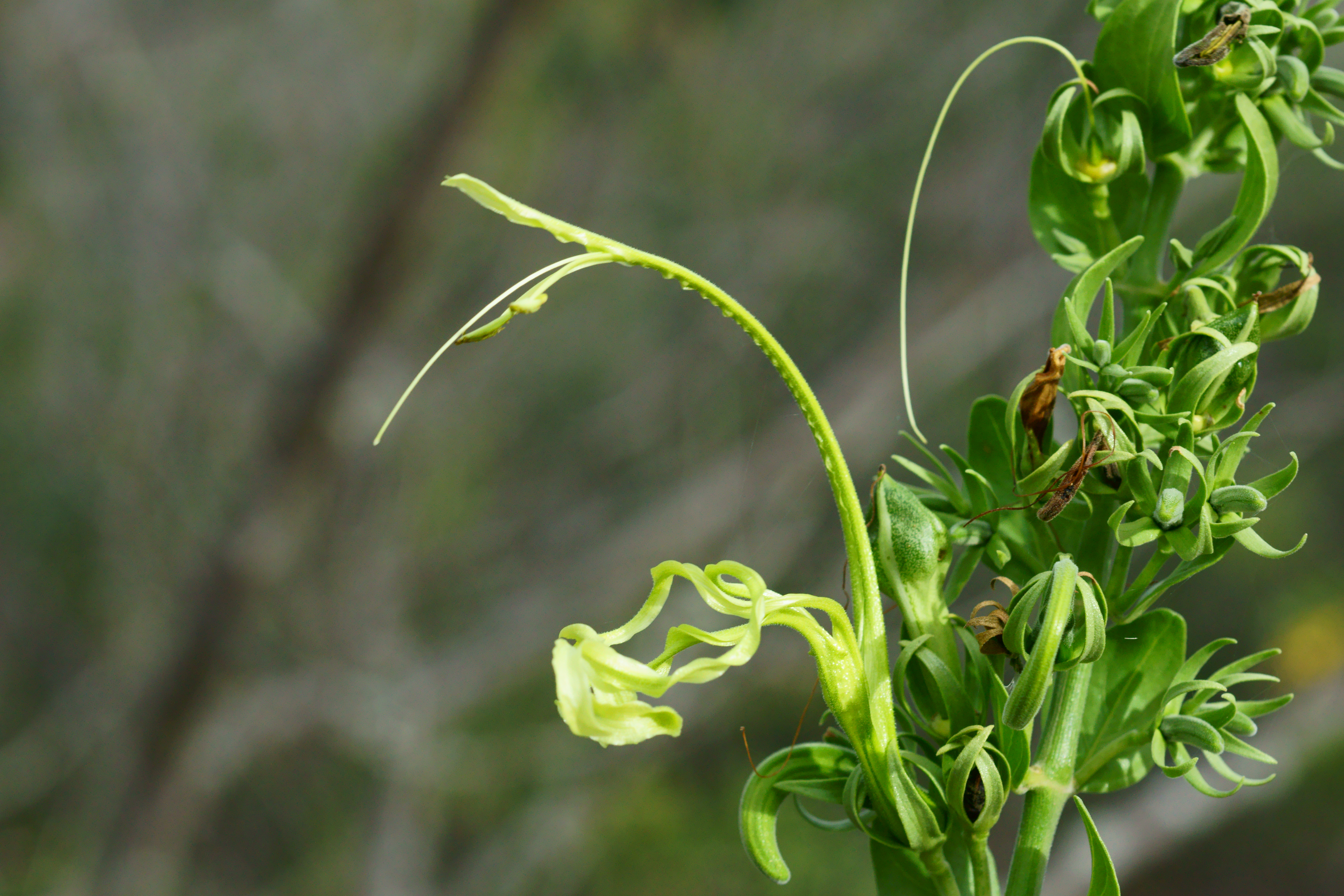
- Harpochilus neesianus

Scientific classification
- Kingdom: Plantae
- Clade: Tracheophytes
- Clade: Angiosperms
- Clade: Eudicots
- Clade: Asterids
- Order: Lamiales
- Family: Acanthaceae
- Genus: Harpochilus; Nees (1847)

= Harpochilus =

Genus of plants

Harpochilus is a genus of flowering plants belonging to the family Acanthaceae. It includes three species endemic to northeastern Brazil.

Species:

- Harpochilus corrugatus Zappi & F.A.Silva
- Harpochilus neesianus Mart. ex Nees
- Harpochilus paraibanus F.K.S.Monteiro, J.I.M.Melo & E.M.P.Fernando
