= Calycacanthus =

Scientific classification
- Kingdom: Plantae
- Clade: Tracheophytes
- Clade: Angiosperms
- Clade: Eudicots
- Clade: Asterids
- Order: Lamiales
- Family: Acanthaceae
- Genus: Calycacanthus; K.Schum. (1889)
- Species: C. magnusianus

Binomial name
- Calycacanthus magnusianus K.Schum. (1889)

Genus of plants

Calycacanthus magnusianus is a species of flowering plant belonging to the family Acanthaceae. It is endemic to New Guinea. A new species in genus Calycacanthus, C. insularis, was discovered in 2023.
