= Chileranthemum =

Scientific classification
- Kingdom: Plantae
- Clade: Tracheophytes
- Clade: Angiosperms
- Clade: Eudicots
- Clade: Asterids
- Order: Lamiales
- Family: Acanthaceae
- Genus: Chileranthemum; Oerst.

Genus of flowering plants

Chileranthemum is a genus of flowering plants belonging to the family Acanthaceae.

Its native range is Mexico to El Salvador.

Species:

- Chileranthemum lottiae T.F.Daniel
- Chileranthemum pyramidatum (Lindau) T.F.Daniel
- Chileranthemum trifidum Oerst.
