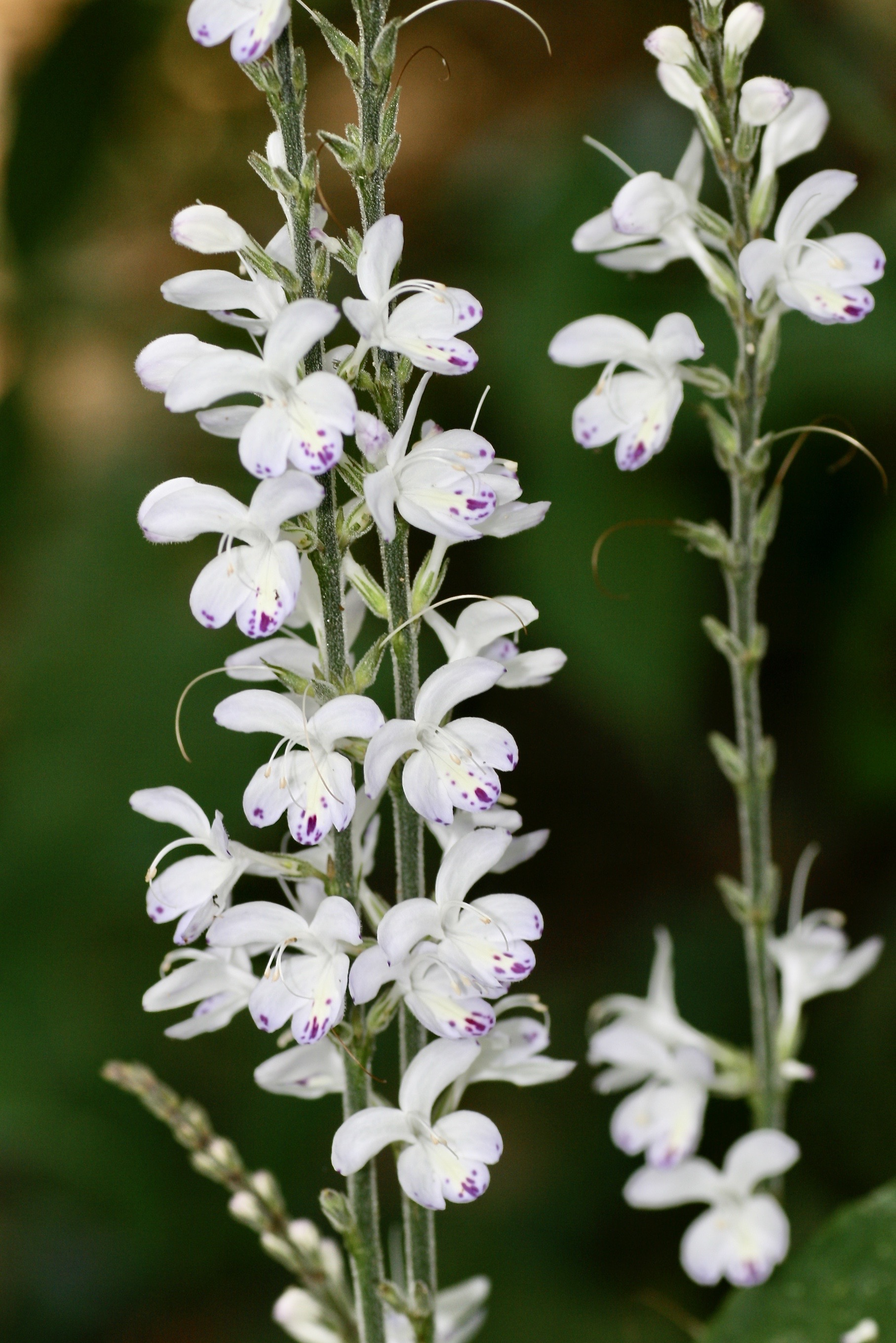
- Pulchranthus adenostachyus in Peru

Scientific classification
- Kingdom: Plantae
- Clade: Tracheophytes
- Clade: Angiosperms
- Clade: Eudicots
- Clade: Asterids
- Order: Lamiales
- Family: Acanthaceae
- Genus: Pulchranthus; V.M.Baum, Reveal & Nowicke (1983)

= Pulchranthus =

Genus of plants

Pulchranthus is a genus of flowering plants belonging to the family Acanthaceae. It includes four species native to northern South America, ranging from Colombia to Bolivia and northern Brazil.

== Species ==
Four species are accepted.

- Pulchranthus adenostachyus (Lindau) V.M.Baum, Reveal & Nowicke
- Pulchranthus congestus (Lindau) V.M.Baum, Reveal & Nowicke
- Pulchranthus surinamensis (Bremek.) V.M.Baum, Reveal & Nowicke
- Pulchranthus variegatus (Aubl.) V.M.Baum, Reveal & Nowicke
