= Sphacanthus =

Scientific classification
- Kingdom: Plantae
- Clade: Tracheophytes
- Clade: Angiosperms
- Clade: Eudicots
- Clade: Asterids
- Order: Lamiales
- Family: Acanthaceae
- Genus: Sphacanthus; Benoist (1939)

Genus of plants

Sphacanthus is a genus of flowering plants belonging to the family Acanthaceae. It includes two species endemic to Madagascar.

== Species ==
Two species are accepted.

- Sphacanthus brillantaisia Benoist
- Sphacanthus humbertii Benoist
