= Pericalypta =

Scientific classification
- Kingdom: Plantae
- Clade: Tracheophytes
- Clade: Angiosperms
- Clade: Eudicots
- Clade: Asterids
- Order: Lamiales
- Family: Acanthaceae
- Genus: Pericalypta; Benoist (1962)
- Species: P. biflora

Binomial name
- Pericalypta biflora Benoist (1962)

Genus of flowering plants

Pericalypta biflora is a species of flowering plant belonging to the family Acanthaceae. It is the sole species in genus Pericalypta. It is endemic to Madagascar.
