= Anomacanthus =

Scientific classification
- Kingdom: Plantae
- Clade: Tracheophytes
- Clade: Angiosperms
- Clade: Eudicots
- Clade: Asterids
- Order: Lamiales
- Family: Acanthaceae
- Genus: Anomacanthus; R.D.Good (1923)
- Species: A. congolanus

Binomial name
- Anomacanthus congolanus (De Wild. & T.Durand) Brummitt

Synonyms
- Gilletiella De Wild. & T.Durand (1900), nom. illeg.; Anomacanthus drupaceus R.D.Good (1923); Gilletiella congolana De Wild. & T.Durand (1900); Thunbergia attenuata Benoist (1912)

Genus of flowering plants

Anomacanthus congolanus is a species of flowering plant belonging to the family Acanthaceae. It is a subshrub native to the Democratic Republic of the Congo, Republic of the Congo, and Cabinda Province of Angola. It is the sole species in genus Anomacanthus.
