= Trichosanchezia =

Scientific classification
- Kingdom: Plantae
- Clade: Tracheophytes
- Clade: Angiosperms
- Clade: Eudicots
- Clade: Asterids
- Order: Lamiales
- Family: Acanthaceae
- Genus: Trichosanchezia; Mildbr. (1926)
- Species: T. chrysothrix

Binomial name
- Trichosanchezia chrysothrix Mildbr. (1926)

Genus of flowering plants

Trichosanchezia chrysothrix is a species of flowering plants belonging to the family Acanthaceae. It is endemic to Peru. It is the sole species in genus Trichosanchezia.
