= Stenothyrsus =

Scientific classification
- Kingdom: Plantae
- Clade: Tracheophytes
- Clade: Angiosperms
- Clade: Eudicots
- Clade: Asterids
- Order: Lamiales
- Family: Acanthaceae
- Genus: Stenothyrsus; C.B.Clarke (1908)
- Species: S. ridleyi

Binomial name
- Stenothyrsus ridleyi C.B.Clarke (1908)

Genus of plants

Stenothyrsus is a monotypic genus of flowering plants belonging to the family Acanthaceae. The only species is Stenothyrsus ridleyi. It is endemic to Perak in Peninsular Malaysia.
