= Crossandrella =

Scientific classification
- Kingdom: Plantae
- Clade: Tracheophytes
- Clade: Angiosperms
- Clade: Eudicots
- Clade: Asterids
- Order: Lamiales
- Family: Acanthaceae
- Genus: Crossandrella; C.B.Clarke (1906)

Genus of plants

Crossandrella is a genus of flowering plants belonging to the family Acanthaceae.

Its native range is tropical Africa, including Liberia and from Nigeria to Tanzania.

Species:

- Crossandrella adamii Heine
- Crossandrella cristalensis Champl. & Senterre
- Crossandrella dusenii (Lindau) S.Moore
