= Camarotea =

Scientific classification
- Kingdom: Plantae
- Clade: Tracheophytes
- Clade: Angiosperms
- Clade: Eudicots
- Clade: Asterids
- Order: Lamiales
- Family: Acanthaceae
- Genus: Camarotea; Elliot (1891)
- Species: C. souiensis

Binomial name
- Camarotea souiensis Scott Elliot (1891)

Genus of flowering plants

Camarotea souiensis is a species of flowering plant belonging to the family Acanthaceae. It is a shrub endemic to southern Madagascar. It is the sole species in genus Camarotea.
