= Hoverdenia =

Scientific classification
- Kingdom: Plantae
- Clade: Tracheophytes
- Clade: Angiosperms
- Clade: Eudicots
- Clade: Asterids
- Order: Lamiales
- Family: Acanthaceae
- Genus: Hoverdenia; Nees (1847)
- Species: H. speciosa

Binomial name
- Hoverdenia speciosa Nees (1847)

Genus of plants

Hoverdenia is a monotypic genus of flowering plants belonging to the family Acanthaceae. It only contains one species, Hoverdenia speciosa.

It is native to Veracruz and northeastern Mexico.

The genus name of Hoverdenia is in honour of Adrian Josef Graf von Hoverden-Plencken (1798–1875), a Silesian administrator and collector. He was also the president of the former museum in Wrocław. The Latin specific epithet of speciosa refers to speciosus meaning showy. Both genus and species were first described and published in 1847.
