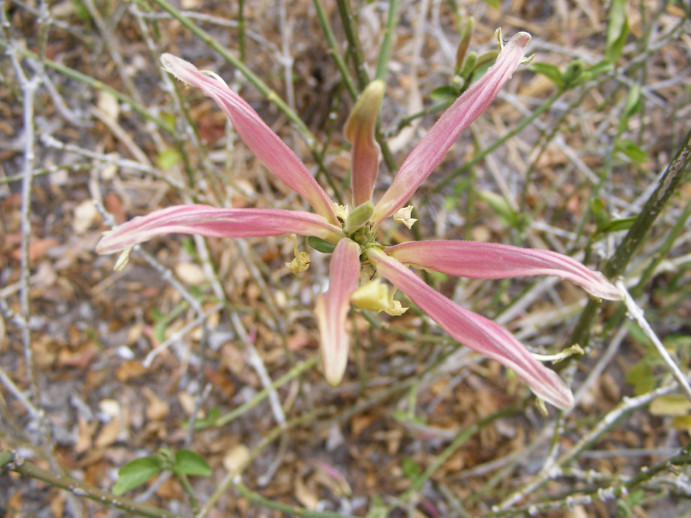
- Anisotes formosissimus (synonym of Symplectochilus formosissimus)

Scientific classification
- Kingdom: Plantae
- Clade: Tracheophytes
- Clade: Angiosperms
- Clade: Eudicots
- Clade: Asterids
- Order: Lamiales
- Family: Acanthaceae
- Genus: Symplectochilus; Lindau (1894)

Synonyms
- Macrorungia C.B.Clarke (1900), nom. superfl.

= Symplectochilus =

Genus of flowering plants

Symplectochilus is a genus of flowering plants belonging to the family Acanthaceae.

Its native range is southern Africa (Malawi, Mozambique, Zambia, and the Northern Provinces of South Africa) and Madagascar.

Two species are accepted

- Symplectochilus formosissimus (Klotzsch) Lindau
- Symplectochilus madagascariensis Briq.
