= Mexacanthus =

Scientific classification
- Kingdom: Plantae
- Clade: Tracheophytes
- Clade: Angiosperms
- Clade: Eudicots
- Clade: Asterids
- Order: Lamiales
- Family: Acanthaceae
- Genus: Mexacanthus; T.F.Daniel (1981)
- Species: M. mcvaughii

Binomial name
- Mexacanthus mcvaughii T.F.Daniel (1981)

Genus of plants

Mexacanthus mcvaughii is a species of flowering plant belonging to the family Acanthaceae. It is endemic to southwestern Mexico. It is the sole species in genus Mexacanthus.
