= Gymnophragma =

Scientific classification
- Kingdom: Plantae
- Clade: Tracheophytes
- Clade: Angiosperms
- Clade: Eudicots
- Clade: Asterids
- Order: Lamiales
- Family: Acanthaceae
- Genus: Gymnophragma; Lindau
- Species: G. simplex

Binomial name
- Gymnophragma simplex Lindau

Genus of flowering plants

Gymnophragma is a monotypic genus of flowering plants belonging to the family Acanthaceae. The only species is Gymnophragma simplex.

Its native range is New Guinea.
