= Dichazothece =

Scientific classification
- Kingdom: Plantae
- Clade: Tracheophytes
- Clade: Angiosperms
- Clade: Eudicots
- Clade: Asterids
- Order: Lamiales
- Family: Acanthaceae
- Genus: Dichazothece; Lindau (1898)
- Species: D. cylindracea

Binomial name
- Dichazothece cylindracea Lindau (1898)

Genus of plants

Dichazothece cylindracea is a species of flowering plant belonging to the family Acanthaceae. It is native to Rio de Janeiro state of southeastern Brazil. It is the sole species in genus Dichazothece.
