= Diceratotheca =

Scientific classification
- Kingdom: Plantae
- Clade: Tracheophytes
- Clade: Angiosperms
- Clade: Eudicots
- Clade: Asterids
- Order: Lamiales
- Family: Acanthaceae
- Genus: Diceratotheca; J.R.I.Wood & Scotland (2012)
- Species: D. bracteolata

Binomial name
- Diceratotheca bracteolata J.R.I.Wood & Scotland (2012)

Genus of flowering plants

Diceratotheca bracteolata is a species of flowering plant in the family Acanthaceae. It is an evergreen shrub endemic to Thailand. It is the sole species in genus Diceratotheca.

Diceratotheca bracteolata is a multi-trunked shrub, growing 1.5 to 3 meters tall.

The species is known from a single site in northwestern Thailand. It was found growing on partly-shaded stream banks in degraded teak forest on shale-derived soil from 300 to 375 meters elevation. The species' habitat is unprotected and subject to fire and cattle grazing, but the species is not considered in imminent danger of extinction.
