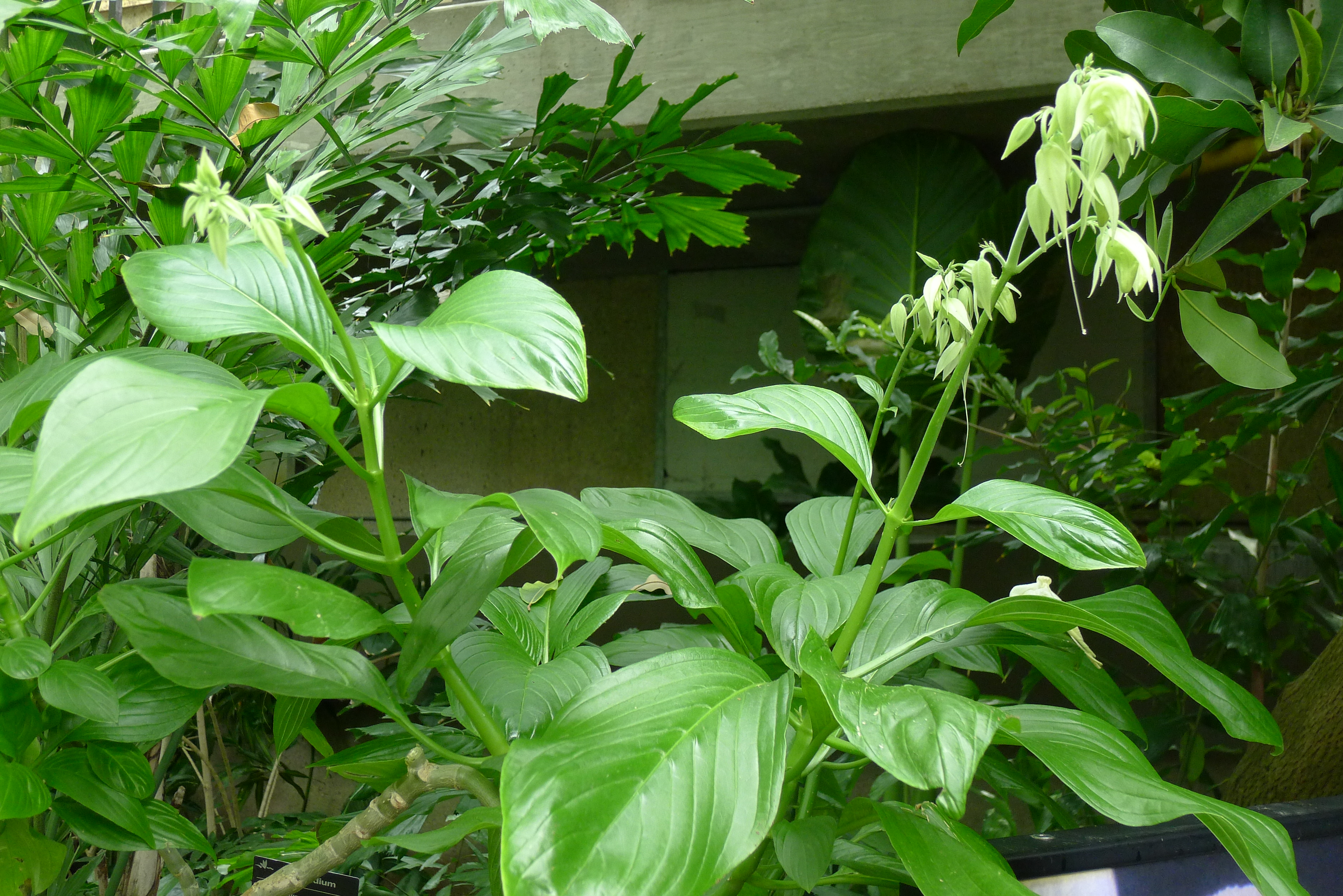
- Louteridium panamensis

Scientific classification
- Kingdom: Plantae
- Clade: Tracheophytes
- Clade: Angiosperms
- Clade: Eudicots
- Clade: Asterids
- Order: Lamiales
- Family: Acanthaceae
- Genus: Louteridium; S.Watson (1888)

Synonyms
- Neolindenia Baill. (1890)

= Louteridium =

Genus of plants

Louteridium is a genus of flowering plants belonging to the family Acanthaceae.

Its native range is Mexico to Central America.

Species:

- Louteridium brevicalyx A.T.Richardson
- Louteridium chartaceum Leonard
- Louteridium costaricense Radlk. & Donn.Sm.
- Louteridium dendropilosum T.F.Daniel
- Louteridium donnell-smithii S.Watson
- Louteridium koelzii Miranda & McVaugh
- Louteridium mexicanum (Baill.) Standl.
- Louteridium parayi Miranda
- Louteridium purpusii Brandegee
- Louteridium rzedowskianum T.F.Daniel
- Louteridium tamaulipense A.T.Richardson
