= Ascotheca =

Scientific classification
- Kingdom: Plantae
- Clade: Tracheophytes
- Clade: Angiosperms
- Clade: Eudicots
- Clade: Asterids
- Order: Lamiales
- Family: Acanthaceae
- Genus: Ascotheca; Heine
- Species: A. paucinervia

Binomial name
- Ascotheca paucinervia (T.Anderson ex C.B.Clarke) Heine (1966)

Subspecies
- Ascotheca paucinervia var. minor Champl. & Senterre; Ascotheca paucinervia var. paucinervia

Synonyms
- Justicia paucinervia T.Anderson ex C.B.Clarke (1899); Ruellia paucinervia (T.Anderson ex C.B.Clarke) Heine (1962); Rungia paucinervia (T.Anderson ex C.B.Clarke) Heine (1962)

Genus of flowering plants

Ascotheca paucinervia is a species of flowering plant belonging to the family Acanthaceae. It is a subshrub or shrub native to west-central tropical Africa, ranging from southern Nigeria to Cameroon, mainland Equatorial Guinea, and Gabon. It is the sole species in genus Ascotheca.

Two subspecies are accepted:

- Ascotheca paucinervia var. minor Champl. & Senterre – Cameroon and mainland Equatorial Guinea
- Ascotheca paucinervia var. paucinervia – (synonym Rungia obcordata Lindau (1905)) – southern Nigeria, Cameroon, and Gabon
