= Melittacanthus =

Scientific classification
- Kingdom: Plantae
- Clade: Tracheophytes
- Clade: Angiosperms
- Clade: Eudicots
- Clade: Asterids
- Order: Lamiales
- Family: Acanthaceae
- Genus: Melittacanthus; S.Moore (1906)
- Species: M. divaricatus

Binomial name
- Melittacanthus divaricatus S.Moore (1906)

Varieties
- Melittacanthus divaricatus var. divaricatus; Melittacanthus divaricatus var. minor Benoist

Genus of plants

Melittacanthus divaricatus is a species of flowering plant belonging to the family Acanthaceae. It is a subshrub native to central and east-central Madagascar. It is the sole species in genus Melittacanthus.

Two varieties are accepted:

- Melittacanthus divaricatus var. divaricatus
- Melittacanthus divaricatus var. minor Benoist
