= Vavara =

Scientific classification
- Kingdom: Plantae
- Clade: Tracheophytes
- Clade: Angiosperms
- Clade: Eudicots
- Clade: Asterids
- Order: Lamiales
- Family: Acanthaceae
- Genus: Vavara; Benoist (2022 publ. 2021)
- Species: V. breviflora

Binomial name
- Vavara breviflora (Benoist) Benoist ex I.Darbysh. & E.A.Tripp

Synonyms
- Rhinacanthus breviflorus Benoist (1946)

Genus of flowering plants

Vavara breviflora is a species of flowering plant belonging to the family Acanthaceae. It is endemic to Madagascar. It is the sole species in genus Vavara.
