= Ptyssiglottis =

Scientific classification
- Kingdom: Plantae
- Clade: Tracheophytes
- Clade: Angiosperms
- Clade: Eudicots
- Clade: Asterids
- Order: Lamiales
- Family: Acanthaceae
- Genus: Ptyssiglottis; T.Anderson (1860)

Synonyms
- Ancylacanthus Lindau (1913); Hallieracantha Stapf (1907); Oreothyrsus Lindau (1905); Polytrema C.B.Clarke (1908)

Genus of plants

Ptyssiglottis is a genus of flowering plants belonging to the family Acanthaceae. It includes 38 species native to tropical Asia and Papuasia, ranging from Sri Lanka to Indochina, Malesia, New Guinea, and the Bismarck Archipelago.

== Species ==
38 species are accepted.

- Ptyssiglottis auriculata Hallier f.
- Ptyssiglottis bantamensis S.Moore
- Ptyssiglottis campanulata B.Hansen
- Ptyssiglottis caudata (Stapf) B.Hansen
- Ptyssiglottis chrysea Ridl.
- Ptyssiglottis creaghii (Stapf) B.Hansen
- Ptyssiglottis cuprea (Ridl.) B.Hansen
- Ptyssiglottis cyrtandroides (Lindau) B.Hansen
- Ptyssiglottis decurrens B.Hansen
- Ptyssiglottis densiflora (C.B.Clarke) Ridl.
- Ptyssiglottis dulcamarioides (Stapf) B.Hansen
- Ptyssiglottis fastidiosa (Benoist) B.Hansen
- Ptyssiglottis fusca B.Hansen
- Ptyssiglottis gibbsiae S.Moore
- Ptyssiglottis glabrisepala (Lindau) B.Hansen
- Ptyssiglottis glandulifera B.Hansen
- Ptyssiglottis granulata (Stapf) B.Hansen
- Ptyssiglottis hallieri Valeton
- Ptyssiglottis hirsuta Hallier f.
- Ptyssiglottis isophylla (C.B.Clarke) B.Hansen
- Ptyssiglottis kunthiana (Nees) B.Hansen
- Ptyssiglottis lanceolata Hallier f.
- Ptyssiglottis longisepala B.Hansen
- Ptyssiglottis maxima Valeton
- Ptyssiglottis mucronata B.Hansen
- Ptyssiglottis nigrescens (Merr.) B.Hansen
- Ptyssiglottis peranthera (Bremek.) B.Hansen
- Ptyssiglottis picta Hallier f.
- Ptyssiglottis psychotriifolia (Stapf) B.Hansen
- Ptyssiglottis pubescens B.Hansen
- Ptyssiglottis pubisepala (Lindau) B.Hansen
- Ptyssiglottis radicans (C.B.Clarke) S.Moore
- Ptyssiglottis rubrolutea Ridl.
- Ptyssiglottis salicifolia (Stapf) B.Hansen
- Ptyssiglottis sanguinolenta (Vahl) B.Hansen
- Ptyssiglottis staminodifera B.Hansen
- Ptyssiglottis subcordata S.Moore
- Ptyssiglottis undulata (Merr.) B.Hansen
