= Salpixantha =

Scientific classification
- Kingdom: Plantae
- Clade: Tracheophytes
- Clade: Angiosperms
- Clade: Eudicots
- Clade: Asterids
- Order: Lamiales
- Family: Acanthaceae
- Genus: Salpixantha; Hook. (1845)
- Species: S. coccinea

Binomial name
- Salpixantha coccinea Hook. (1845)

Synonyms
- Geissomeria coccinea (Hook.) T.Anderson ex Griseb. (1862)

Genus of plants

Salpixantha coccinea is a species of flowering plant belonging to the family Acanthaceae. It is endemic to Jamaica. It is the sole species in genus Salpixantha.
