= Gypsacanthus =

Scientific classification
- Kingdom: Plantae
- Clade: Tracheophytes
- Clade: Angiosperms
- Clade: Eudicots
- Clade: Asterids
- Order: Lamiales
- Family: Acanthaceae
- Genus: Gypsacanthus; E.J.Lott, V.Jaram. & Rzed. (1984 publ. 1986)
- Species: G. nelsonii

Binomial name
- Gypsacanthus nelsonii E.J.Lott, V.Jaram. & Rzed. (1984 publ. 1986)

Genus of plants

Gypsacanthus nelsonii is a species of flowering plant belonging to the family Acanthaceae. It is a shrub native to central and southwestern Mexico. It is the sole species in genus Gypsacanthus.
