= Liberatia =

Scientific classification
- Kingdom: Plantae
- Clade: Tracheophytes
- Clade: Angiosperms
- Clade: Eudicots
- Clade: Asterids
- Order: Lamiales
- Family: Acanthaceae
- Genus: Liberatia; Rizzini

Genus of flowering plant

Liberatia is a genus of flowering plants belonging to the family Acanthaceae.

It is native to Bolivia and Brazil.

The genus name of Liberatia is in honour of Liberato Joaquim Barroso (1900–1949), a Brazilian botanist and agronomist. It was first described and published in Bol. Mus. Nac. Rio de Janeiro, Bot. Vol.8 on page 21 in 1947.

Known species, according to Kew:

- Liberatia boliviana R.C.Foster
- Liberatia diandra (Nees) Rizzini
