= Ritonia =

Scientific classification
- Kingdom: Plantae
- Clade: Tracheophytes
- Clade: Angiosperms
- Clade: Eudicots
- Clade: Asterids
- Order: Lamiales
- Family: Acanthaceae
- Genus: Ritonia; Benoist (1962)

Genus of plants

Ritonia is a genus of flowering plants belonging to the family Acanthaceae.

Its native range is Madagascar.

Species:

- Ritonia barbigera Benoist
- Ritonia humbertii Benoist
- Ritonia rosea Benoist
