= Populina (plant) =

Scientific classification
- Kingdom: Plantae
- Clade: Tracheophytes
- Clade: Angiosperms
- Clade: Eudicots
- Clade: Asterids
- Order: Lamiales
- Family: Acanthaceae
- Genus: Populina; Baill. (1891)

Species
- Populina perrieri Benoist; Populina richardii Baill.

Genus of flowering plants

Populina is a genus of flowering plants in the family Acanthaceae. It includes two species endemic to Madagascar.

- Populina perrieri Benoist
- Populina richardii Baill.
