= Anisostachya =

Scientific classification
- Kingdom: Plantae
- Clade: Tracheophytes
- Clade: Angiosperms
- Clade: Eudicots
- Clade: Asterids
- Order: Lamiales
- Family: Acanthaceae
- Genus: Anisostachya; Nees (1847)

species
- 61; see text

Synonyms
- Corymbostachys Lindau (1897)

Genus of plants

Anisostachya is a genus of flowering plants in the family Acanthaceae. It includes 61 species native to tropical Africa, Madagascar, and the Comoros.

== Species ==
61 species are accepted:

- Anisostachya aequiloba Benoist
- Anisostachya ambositrensis Benoist
- Anisostachya amoena Benoist
- Anisostachya andringitrensis Benoist
- Anisostachya apikyensis Benoist
- Anisostachya arida (Scott Elliot) Benoist
- Anisostachya armandii Benoist
- Anisostachya atrorubra Benoist
- Anisostachya australis Benoist
- Anisostachya betsiliensis Benoist
- Anisostachya betsimisaraka Benoist
- Anisostachya bivalvis Benoist
- Anisostachya bojeri Nees
- Anisostachya bosseri Benoist
- Anisostachya brevibracteata Benoist
- Anisostachya breviloba Benoist
- Anisostachya capuronii Benoist
- Anisostachya castellana Benoist
- Anisostachya coccinea Benoist
- Anisostachya cognata Benoist
- Anisostachya colorata Benoist
- Anisostachya debilis Benoist
- Anisostachya delphinensis Benoist
- Anisostachya denticulata Benoist
- Anisostachya dispersa Benoist
- Anisostachya elata Benoist
- Anisostachya elliptica Benoist
- Anisostachya elytraria (Lindau) Benoist
- Anisostachya eromoensis Benoist
- Anisostachya haplostachya (Nees) Lindau
- Anisostachya humbertii Benoist
- Anisostachya humblotii Benoist
- Anisostachya incisa Benoist
- Anisostachya induta Benoist
- Anisostachya latebracteata Benoist
- Anisostachya littoralis Benoist
- Anisostachya maculata Benoist
- Anisostachya modica Benoist
- Anisostachya oblonga Benoist
- Anisostachya parvifolia Benoist
- Anisostachya paucinervis Benoist
- Anisostachya perrieri Benoist
- Anisostachya puberula Benoist
- Anisostachya pubescens Benoist
- Anisostachya purpurea Benoist
- Anisostachya ramosa Benoist
- Anisostachya reptans (Nees) Lindau
- Anisostachya ripicola Benoist
- Anisostachya rivalis Benoist
- Anisostachya rosea Benoist
- Anisostachya sambiranensis Benoist
- Anisostachya seyrigii Benoist
- Anisostachya spatulata Benoist
- Anisostachya straminea Benoist
- Anisostachya taviala Benoist
- Anisostachya tenella (Nees) Lindau
- Anisostachya triticea (Baker) Benoist
- Anisostachya ungemachii Benoist
- Anisostachya velutina Nees
- Anisostachya vestita Benoist
- Anisostachya vohemarensis Benoist
