= Kosmosiphon =

Scientific classification
- Kingdom: Plantae
- Clade: Tracheophytes
- Clade: Angiosperms
- Clade: Eudicots
- Clade: Asterids
- Order: Lamiales
- Family: Acanthaceae
- Genus: Kosmosiphon; Lindau (1913)
- Species: K. azureus

Binomial name
- Kosmosiphon azureus Lindau (1913)

Genus of plants

Kosmosiphon azureus is a species of flowering plants belonging to the family Acanthaceae. It is native to Cameroon and Democratic Republic of the Congo in west-central tropical Africa. It is the sole species in genus Kosmosiphon.
