= Echinacanthus =

Scientific classification
- Kingdom: Plantae
- Clade: Tracheophytes
- Clade: Angiosperms
- Clade: Eudicots
- Clade: Asterids
- Order: Lamiales
- Family: Acanthaceae
- Genus: Echinacanthus; Nees (1832)

Genus of plants

Echinacanthus is a genus of flowering plants belonging to the family Acanthaceae.

Its native range is Himalaya to Southern China.

Species:

- Echinacanthus attenuatus Nees
- Echinacanthus lofuensis (H.Lév.) J.R.I.Wood
- Echinacanthus longipes H.S.Lo & D.Fang
- Echinacanthus longzhouensis H.S.Lo
