= Chalarothyrsus =

Scientific classification
- Kingdom: Plantae
- Clade: Tracheophytes
- Clade: Angiosperms
- Clade: Eudicots
- Clade: Asterids
- Order: Lamiales
- Family: Acanthaceae
- Genus: Chalarothyrsus; Lindau (1904)
- Species: C. amplexicaulis

Binomial name
- Chalarothyrsus amplexicaulis Lindau (1904)

Genus of flowering plants

Chalarothyrsus amplexicaulis is a species of flowering plant belonging to the family Acanthaceae. It is a subshrub native to central and southwestern Mexico. It is the sole species in genus Chalarothyrsus.

The genus and species were described by German botanist and mycologist Gustav Lindau and was published in Bulletin de l'Herbier Boissier, sér. 2, 4: 327 in 1904.

Species:

- Chalarothyrsus Lindau
