= Streptosiphon =

Conservation status
- Endangered (IUCN 3.1)

Scientific classification
- Kingdom: Plantae
- Clade: Embryophytes
- Clade: Tracheophytes
- Clade: Angiosperms
- Clade: Eudicots
- Clade: Asterids
- Order: Lamiales
- Family: Acanthaceae
- Genus: Streptosiphon; Mildbr. (1935)
- Species: S. hirsutus

Binomial name
- Streptosiphon hirsutus Mildbr. (1935)

Genus of plants

Streptosiphon hirsutus is a species of flowering plant belonging to the family Acanthaceae. It is a shrub endemic to Tanzania. It is the sole species in genus Streptosiphon.
