= Champluviera =

Scientific classification
- Kingdom: Plantae
- Clade: Tracheophytes
- Clade: Angiosperms
- Clade: Eudicots
- Clade: Asterids
- Order: Lamiales
- Family: Acanthaceae
- Genus: Champluviera; I.Darbysh., T.F.Daniel & Kiel

Genus of flowering plants

Champluviera is a genus of flowering plants belonging to the family Acanthaceae.

Its native range is Southern Nigeria to Gabon, Bioko.

Species:

- Champluviera nuda (C.B.Clarke) I.Darbysh. & T.F.Daniel
- Champluviera populifolia (C.B.Clarke) I.Darbysh. & T.F.Daniel
