= Thyrsacanthus =

- Thyrsacanthus sulcatus in Argentina

Scientific classification
- Kingdom: Plantae
- Clade: Tracheophytes
- Clade: Angiosperms
- Clade: Eudicots
- Clade: Asterids
- Order: Lamiales
- Family: Acanthaceae
- Subfamily: Acanthoideae
- Tribe: Justicieae
- Genus: Thyrsacanthus; Moric. (1847)

Species
- See text

Synonyms
- Drejera Nees (1847)

Genus of flowering plants

Thyrsacanthus is a genus of flowering plants in the family Acanthaceae, found in South America east of the Andes, typically in drier areas. Perennial shrubs, they were resurrected from Anisacanthus in 2010, leaving it with the North American species.

== Species ==
Currently accepted species include:

- Thyrsacanthus angustissimus (A.L.A.Côrtes & Rapini) Alcantara & M.Alves
- Thyrsacanthus boliviensis (Nees) A.L.A.Côrtes & Rapini
- Thyrsacanthus microphyllus A.L.A.Côrtes & Rapini
- Thyrsacanthus ramosissimus Moric.
- Thyrsacanthus ramosus (Nees) A.L.A.Côrtes & Rapini
- Thyrsacanthus secundus (Leonard) A.L.A.Côrtes & Rapini
- Thyrsacanthus sulcatus (Nees) C.Ezcurra & A.L.A.Côrtes
