= Graphandra =

Scientific classification
- Kingdom: Plantae
- Clade: Tracheophytes
- Clade: Angiosperms
- Clade: Eudicots
- Clade: Asterids
- Order: Lamiales
- Family: Acanthaceae
- Genus: Graphandra; Imlay (1939)
- Species: G. procumbens

Binomial name
- Graphandra procumbens Imlay (1939)

Genus of plants

Graphandra procumbens is a species of flowering plant belonging to the family Acanthaceae. It is endemic to Thailand. It is the sole species in genus Graphandra.
