= Haplanthus =

Scientific classification
- Kingdom: Plantae
- Clade: Tracheophytes
- Clade: Angiosperms
- Clade: Eudicots
- Clade: Asterids
- Order: Lamiales
- Family: Acanthaceae
- Genus: Haplanthus; Nees (1832)

Synonyms
- Haplanthoides H.W.Li (1983), nom. illeg.

Genus of plants

Haplanthus is a genus of flowering plants belonging to the family Acanthaceae. It includes four species native to the Indian subcontinent, Indochina, southern China, Peninsular Malaysia, Borneo, Java, and the Lesser Sunda Islands.

Species:

- Haplanthus hygrophiloides T.Anderson
- Haplanthus laxiflorus (Blume) Gnanasek., G.V.S.Murthy & Y.F.Deng
- Haplanthus ovatus (T.Anderson ex Bedd.) Gnanasek., G.V.S.Murthy & Y.F.Deng
- Haplanthus rosulatus (Bremek.) Gnanasek., G.V.S.Murthy & Y.F.Deng
