= Leptostachya =

Scientific classification
- Kingdom: Plantae
- Clade: Tracheophytes
- Clade: Angiosperms
- Clade: Eudicots
- Clade: Asterids
- Order: Lamiales
- Family: Acanthaceae
- Genus: Leptostachya; Nees (1832), nom. cons.
- Species: L. wallichii

Binomial name
- Leptostachya wallichii Nees (1832)

Synonyms
- Synonymy: Dianthera debilis C.B.Clarke (1885), nom. illeg.; Dianthera leptostachya C.B.Clarke (1885); Dianthera wallichii (Nees) Vidal (1885); Ecbolium clarkeanum Kuntze (1891); Ecbolium hemsleyanum Kuntze (1891); Ecbolium leptostachyum (C.B.Clarke) Kuntze (1891); Hallieracantha laxa (Lindau) Stapf (1907); Justicia muticitheca J.B.Imlay (1939); Justicia neodebilis Bennet (1983), nom. superfl.; Leptostachya anguina (Benoist) Bremek. (1961); Leptostachya debilis Hosseus (1907), nom. superfl.; Justicia wallichii (Nees) T.Anderson (1867); Odontonemella leptostachya (C.B.Clarke) Lindau (1895); Ophiorrhiziphyllon laxum Lindau(1897); Ptyssiglottis anguina Benoist (1936); Ptyssiglottis debilis S.Moore (1922), nom. superfl.; Ptyssiglottis laxa (Lindau) Benoist (1935); Ptyssiglottis leptostachya (C.B.Clarke) S.Moore (1922); Ptyssiglottis tonkinensis Benoist (1936), nom. illeg.; Ptyssiglottis tonkinensis S.Moore (1922); Ruellia leptostachya Wall. (1830), not validly publ.

Genus of flowering plants

Leptostachya wallichii is a species of flowering plant in the family Acanthaceae. It is a perennial native to tropical Asia, where it ranges from India through Indochina to southeastern China (Guangxi and Guangdong provinces) and Borneo.
