= Clistax =

Scientific classification
- Kingdom: Plantae
- Clade: Tracheophytes
- Clade: Angiosperms
- Clade: Eudicots
- Clade: Asterids
- Order: Lamiales
- Family: Acanthaceae
- Genus: Clistax; Mart. (1829)

Synonyms
- Corythacanthus Nees (1836)

Genus of flowering plants

Clistax is a genus of flowering plants belonging to the family Acanthaceae. It includes three species native to Brazil.

Species:

- Clistax bahiensis Profice & Leitman
- Clistax brasiliensis Mart.
- Clistax speciosus Nees
