= Pseudocalyx =

Scientific classification
- Kingdom: Plantae
- Clade: Tracheophytes
- Clade: Angiosperms
- Clade: Eudicots
- Clade: Asterids
- Order: Lamiales
- Family: Acanthaceae
- Genus: Pseudocalyx; Radlk.

Genus of plants

Pseudocalyx is a genus of flowering plants belonging to the family Acanthaceae.

Its native range is Gabon to Tanzania and Southern Tropical Africa, Madagascar.

Species:

- Pseudocalyx aurantiacus Benoist
- Pseudocalyx libericus Breteler
- Pseudocalyx macrophyllus McPherson & A.Louis
- Pseudocalyx ochraceus Champl.
- Pseudocalyx pasquierorum Breteler
- Pseudocalyx saccatus Radlk.
