= Cephalophis =

Scientific classification
- Kingdom: Plantae
- Clade: Tracheophytes
- Clade: Angiosperms
- Clade: Eudicots
- Clade: Asterids
- Order: Lamiales
- Family: Acanthaceae
- Genus: Cephalophis; Vollesen (2010)
- Species: C. lukei

Binomial name
- Cephalophis lukei Vollesen (2010)

Genus of flowering plants

Cephalophis lukei is a species of flowering plant belonging to the family Acanthaceae. It is a perennial or subshrub native to southeastern Kenya and Mozambique. It is the sole species in genus Cephalophis.
