= Monothecium =

Scientific classification
- Kingdom: Plantae
- Clade: Tracheophytes
- Clade: Angiosperms
- Clade: Eudicots
- Clade: Asterids
- Order: Lamiales
- Family: Acanthaceae
- Genus: Monothecium; Hochst.

Synonyms
- Anthocometes Nees

Genus of plants

Monothecium is a genus of flowering plants belonging to the family Acanthaceae.

Its native range is Central African Republic to Eritrea and Angola, India, and Sri Lanka.

== Species ==
Species:

- Monothecium aristatum (Nees) T.Anderson
- Monothecium glandulosum Hochst.
- Monothecium leucopterum Benoist
