= Thysanostigma =

Scientific classification
- Kingdom: Plantae
- Clade: Tracheophytes
- Clade: Angiosperms
- Clade: Eudicots
- Clade: Asterids
- Order: Lamiales
- Family: Acanthaceae
- Genus: Thysanostigma; J.B.Imlay (1939)

Genus of flowering plants

Thysanostigma is a genus of flowering plants belonging to the family Acanthaceae.

Its native range is Thailand to Malaysian Peninsula.

Species:

- Thysanostigma odontites (Ridl.) B.Hansen
- Thysanostigma siamense J.B.Imlay
