= Phialacanthus =

Scientific classification
- Kingdom: Plantae
- Clade: Tracheophytes
- Clade: Angiosperms
- Clade: Eudicots
- Clade: Asterids
- Order: Lamiales
- Family: Acanthaceae
- Genus: Phialacanthus; Benth. (1876)

Genus of plants

Phialacanthus is a genus of flowering plants belonging to the family Acanthaceae.

Its native range is the Eastern Himalayas and Peninsular Malaysia.

== Species ==
Species:

- Phialacanthus griffithii Benth. & Hook.f.
- Phialacanthus major C.B.Clarke
- Phialacanthus minor C.B.Clarke
- Phialacanthus pauper (C.B.Clarke) Bremek.
- Phialacanthus wrayi C.B.Clarke
