= Anisosepalum =

Scientific classification
- Kingdom: Plantae
- Clade: Tracheophytes
- Clade: Angiosperms
- Clade: Eudicots
- Clade: Asterids
- Order: Lamiales
- Family: Acanthaceae
- Genus: Anisosepalum; E.Hossain

Genus of flowering plants

Anisosepalum is a genus of flowering plants belonging to the family Acanthaceae.

Its native range is Western Central Tropical Africa to Uganda and Zambia.

Species:

- Anisosepalum alboviolaceum (Benoist) E.Hossain
- Anisosepalum humbertii (Mildbr.) E.Hossain
- Anisosepalum lewallei Bamps
