= Podorungia =

Scientific classification
- Kingdom: Plantae
- Clade: Tracheophytes
- Clade: Angiosperms
- Clade: Eudicots
- Clade: Asterids
- Order: Lamiales
- Family: Acanthaceae
- Genus: Podorungia; Baill. (1891)

Synonyms
- Warpuria Stapf (1908)

Genus of plants

Podorungia is a genus of flowering plants belonging to the family Acanthaceae.

Its native range is Madagascar.

Species:

- Podorungia clandestina (Stapf) Benoist
- Podorungia gesnerioides Onjalal. & I.Darbysh.
- Podorungia humblotii Benoist
- Podorungia lantzei Baill.
- Podorungia serotina (Benoist) Benoist
