= Tabascina =

Scientific classification
- Kingdom: Plantae
- Clade: Tracheophytes
- Clade: Angiosperms
- Clade: Eudicots
- Clade: Asterids
- Order: Lamiales
- Family: Acanthaceae
- Genus: Tabascina; Baill. (1891)
- Species: T. lindenii

Binomial name
- Tabascina lindenii Baill. (1891)

Synonyms
- Justicia tabascina T.F.Daniel (1990)

Species of flowering plant

Tabascina lindenii is a species of flowering plant in the family Acanthaceae. It is endemic to southeastern Mexico. It is the sole species in genus Tabascina.
