= Cephalacanthus =

Scientific classification
- Kingdom: Plantae
- Clade: Tracheophytes
- Clade: Angiosperms
- Clade: Eudicots
- Clade: Asterids
- Order: Lamiales
- Family: Acanthaceae
- Genus: Cephalacanthus; Lindau (1905)
- Species: C. maculatus

Binomial name
- Cephalacanthus maculatus Lindau (1905)

Genus of flowering plants

Cephalacanthus maculatus is a species of flowering plant belonging to the family Acanthaceae. It is a subshrub or shrub endemic to San Martín Region of Peru. It is the sole species in genus Cephalacanthus.
