= Mcdadea =

Scientific classification
- Kingdom: Plantae
- Clade: Tracheophytes
- Clade: Angiosperms
- Clade: Eudicots
- Clade: Asterids
- Order: Lamiales
- Family: Acanthaceae
- Tribe: Ruellieae
- Subtribe: Mcdadeinae
- Genus: Mcdadea; E.A.Tripp & I.Darbysh. (2020)
- Species: M. angolensis

Binomial name
- Mcdadea angolensis E.A.Tripp & I.Darbysh. (2020)

Genus of flowering plants

Mcdadea angolensis is a species of flowering plant in the family Acanthaceae. It is the sole species in genus Mcdadea. It is endemic to Angola.
