= Cyphacanthus =

Scientific classification
- Kingdom: Plantae
- Clade: Tracheophytes
- Clade: Angiosperms
- Clade: Eudicots
- Clade: Asterids
- Order: Lamiales
- Family: Acanthaceae
- Genus: Cyphacanthus; Leonard (1953)
- Species: C. atopus

Binomial name
- Cyphacanthus atopus Leonard (1953)

Genus of flowering plants

Cyphacanthus atopus is a species of flowering plant belonging to the family Acanthaceae. It is a shrub endemic to Colombia. It is known from the Magdalena River Valley in Boyacá Department, at 762 meters elevation.
