= Stachyacanthus =

Scientific classification
- Kingdom: Plantae
- Clade: Tracheophytes
- Clade: Angiosperms
- Clade: Eudicots
- Clade: Asterids
- Order: Lamiales
- Family: Acanthaceae
- Genus: Stachyacanthus; Nees (1847)
- Species: S. riedelianus

Binomial name
- Stachyacanthus riedelianus Nees (1847)

Genus of plants

Stachyacanthus is a monotypic genus of flowering plants belonging to the family Acanthaceae. The only species is Stachyacanthus riedelianus.

The species is found in Mato Grosso state of west-central Brazil.
