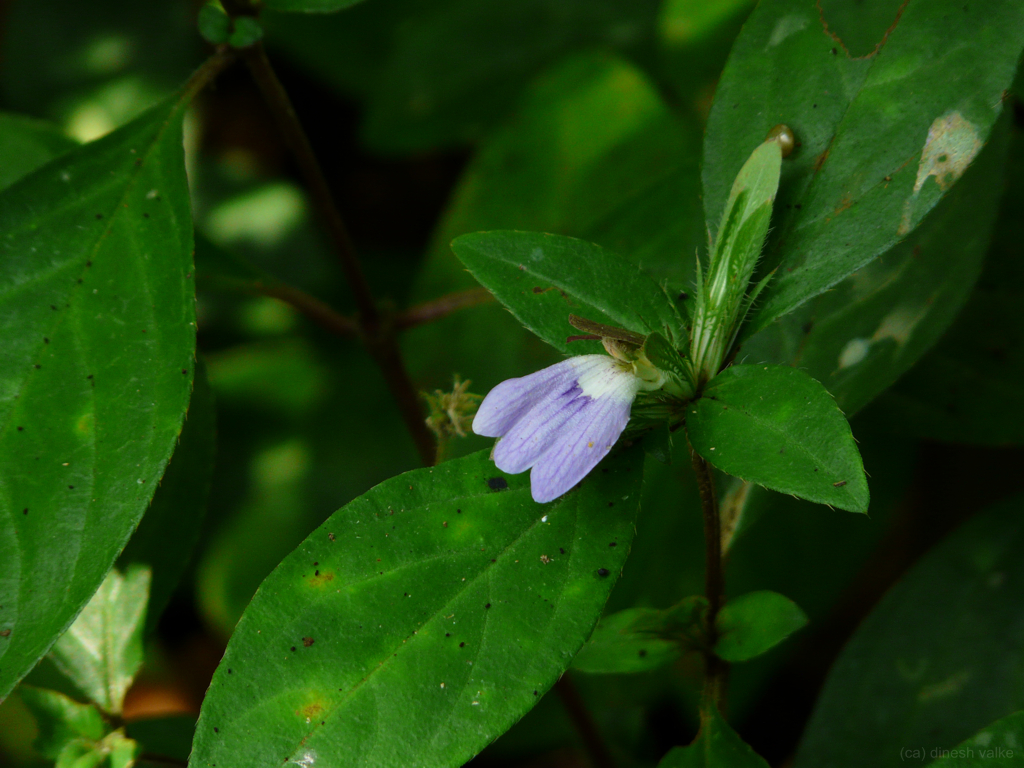

Conservation status
- Least Concern (IUCN 3.1)

Scientific classification
- Kingdom: Plantae
- Clade: Tracheophytes
- Clade: Angiosperms
- Clade: Eudicots
- Clade: Asterids
- Order: Lamiales
- Family: Acanthaceae
- Genus: Cynarospermum; Vollesen (1999)
- Species: C. asperrimum

Binomial name
- Cynarospermum asperrimum (Nees) Vollesen (1999)

Synonyms
- Blepharis asperrima Nees (1847); Justicia aspera Perr. ex Nees (1847), pro syn.

= Cynarospermum =

Genus of flowering plants

Cynarospermum asperrimum is a species of flowering plant belonging to the family Acanthaceae. It is a subshrub endemic to the Western Ghats of western India. It is the sole species in genus Cynarospermum.

Cynarospermum asperrimum is a scrambling or trailing perennial herb, with multiple branches and stems up to 1 meter long. Stems can root in contact with soil. It flowers during the monsoon and post-monsoon season, and attracts several species of butterflies for pollination.

It is locally common in the foothills and hill ranges of the Western Ghats in southern Gujarat, Maharashtra, Goa, and Karnataka states. It grows abundantly in partly-shaded and moist areas, including shrub savannas, forest edges, partly-shaded roadsides, and bunds between fields. It is easily cultivated in pots and gardens.
