= Psiloesthes =

Scientific classification
- Kingdom: Plantae
- Clade: Tracheophytes
- Clade: Angiosperms
- Clade: Eudicots
- Clade: Asterids
- Order: Lamiales
- Family: Acanthaceae
- Genus: Psiloesthes; Benoist (1936)
- Species: P. elongata

Binomial name
- Psiloesthes elongata Benoist (1936)

Species of flowering plant

Psiloesthes elongata is a species of flowering plant in the family Acanthaceae. It is native to northern Vietnam. It is the sole species in genus Psiloesthes.
