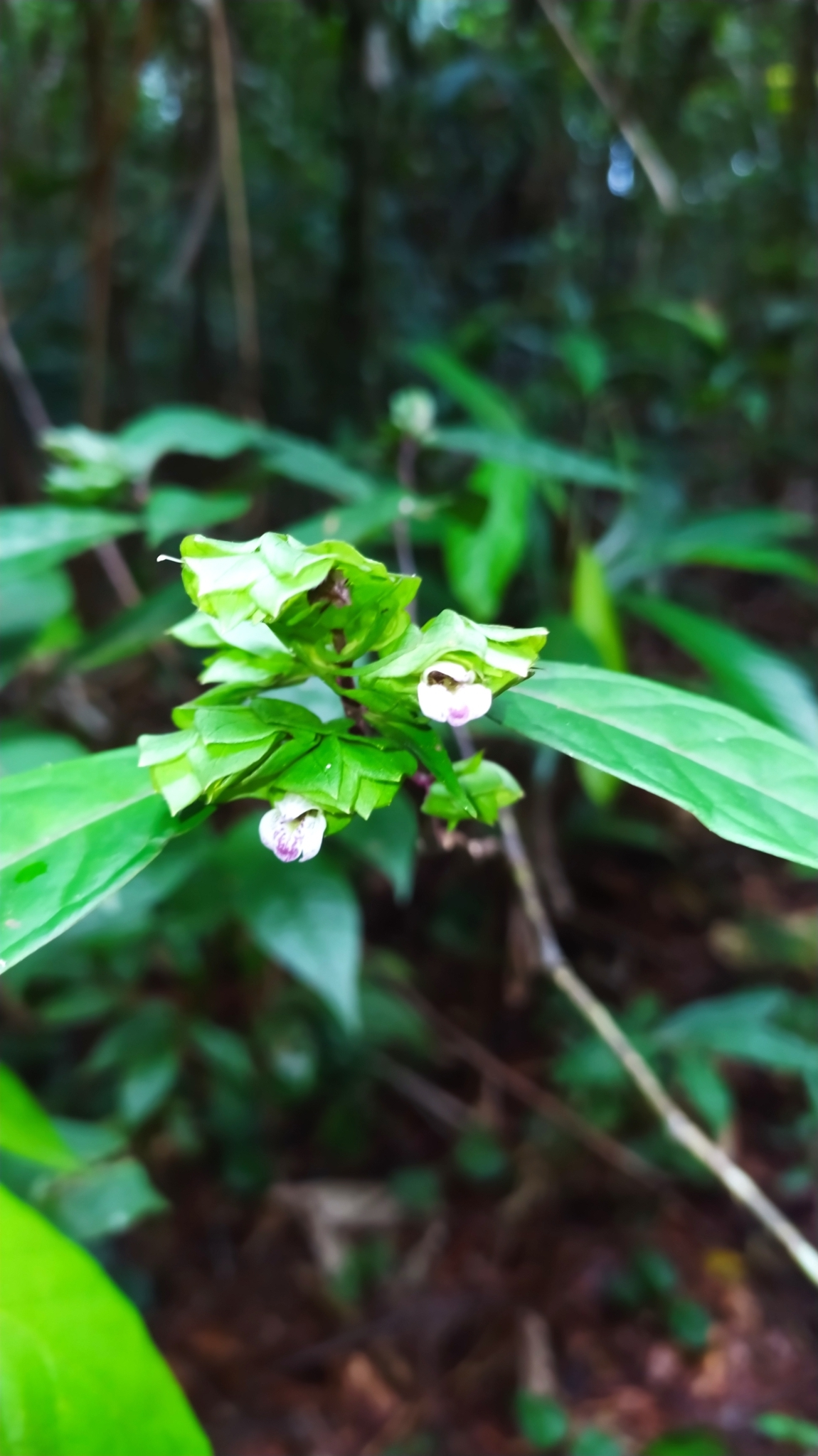
- Herpetacanthus rotundatus in French Guiana

Scientific classification
- Kingdom: Plantae
- Clade: Embryophytes
- Clade: Tracheophytes
- Clade: Spermatophytes
- Clade: Angiosperms
- Clade: Eudicots
- Clade: Asterids
- Order: Lamiales
- Family: Acanthaceae
- Genus: Herpetacanthus; Nees

Synonyms
- Juruasia Lindau; Schultzia Nees; Standleyacanthus Leonard

= Herpetacanthus =

Genus of plants

Herpetacanthus is a genus of flowering plants belonging to the family Acanthaceae. It includes 21 species native to the tropical Americas, ranging from Honduras to Panama in Central America, and from Ecuador and Peru to Bolivia, northern and eastern Brazil, Suriname, and French Guiana in South America.

21 species are accepted:

- Herpetacanthus acaulis Wassh.
- Herpetacanthus acuminatus (Lindau) Bremek.
- Herpetacanthus angustatus Indriunas & Kameyama
- Herpetacanthus chalarostachyus Indriunas & Kameyama
- Herpetacanthus delicatus Indriunas & Kameyama
- Herpetacanthus longiflorus Moric.
- Herpetacanthus longipetiolatus Indriunas & Kameyama
- Herpetacanthus macahensis Nees
- Herpetacanthus macrophyllus Nees
- Herpetacanthus magnobracteolatus Indriunas & Kameyama
- Herpetacanthus melancholicus Nees
- Herpetacanthus napoensis Wassh.
- Herpetacanthus neesianus Indriunas & Kameyama
- Herpetacanthus panamensis Leonard
- Herpetacanthus parvispica Indriunas & Kameyama
- Herpetacanthus pauciflorus Indriunas & Kameyama
- Herpetacanthus rotundatus (Lindau) Bremek.
- Herpetacanthus rubiginosus Nees
- Herpetacanthus stenophyllus Gómez-Laur. & Grayum
- Herpetacanthus strongyloides Indriunas & Kameyama
- Herpetacanthus tetrandrus (Nees & Mart.) Herter
