= Ambongia =

Scientific classification
- Kingdom: Plantae
- Clade: Tracheophytes
- Clade: Angiosperms
- Clade: Eudicots
- Clade: Asterids
- Order: Lamiales
- Family: Acanthaceae
- Genus: Ambongia; Benoist (1939)
- Species: A. perrieri

Binomial name
- Ambongia perrieri Benoist (1939)

Genus of flowering plants

Ambongia perrieri is a species of flowering plant belonging to the family Acanthaceae. It is endemic to Madagascar. It is the sole species in genus Ambongia.
