= Chamaeranthemum =

Scientific classification
- Kingdom: Plantae
- Clade: Tracheophytes
- Clade: Angiosperms
- Clade: Eudicots
- Clade: Asterids
- Order: Lamiales
- Family: Acanthaceae
- Genus: Chamaeranthemum; Nees (1836)

Genus of flowering plants

Chamaeranthemum is a genus of flowering plants belonging to the family Acanthaceae. It includes four species native to the tropical Americas, including Costa Rica, Peru, and southern and southeastern Brazil.

Accepted species:

- Chamaeranthemum beyrichii Nees
- Chamaeranthemum malifolium (Nees) A.L.A.Côrtes
- Chamaeranthemum tonduzii Lindau
- Chamaeranthemum venosum M.B.Foster ex Wassh. & L.B.Sm.
