= Chlamydacanthus =

Scientific classification
- Kingdom: Plantae
- Clade: Tracheophytes
- Clade: Angiosperms
- Clade: Eudicots
- Clade: Asterids
- Order: Lamiales
- Family: Acanthaceae
- Genus: Chlamydacanthus; Lindau (1893)

Synonyms
- Theileamea Baill. (1890)

Genus of flowering plants

Chlamydacanthus is a genus of flowering plants belonging to the family Acanthaceae.

Its native range is eastern tropical Africa (Kenya and Tanzania) and Madagascar.

Species:

- Chlamydacanthus euphorbioides Lindau
- Chlamydacanthus lindavianus H.J.P.Winkl.
- Chlamydacanthus rupestris (Nees) Govaerts
