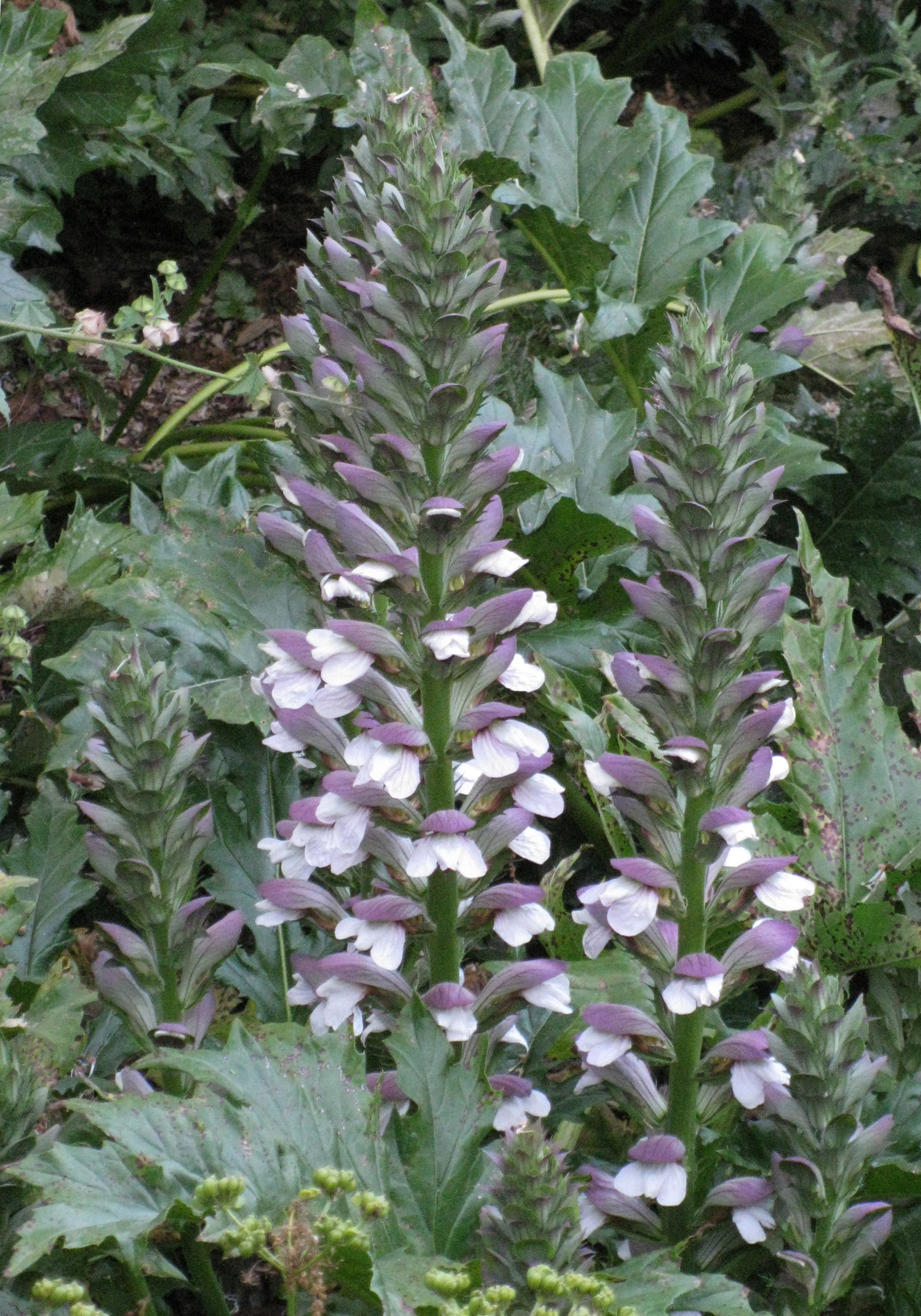
- Acanthus mollis

Scientific classification
- Kingdom: Plantae
- Clade: Tracheophytes
- Clade: Angiosperms
- Clade: Eudicots
- Clade: Asterids
- Order: Lamiales
- Family: Acanthaceae; Juss.

Type genus
- Acanthus L.

Subfamilies
- Acanthoideae; Avicennioideae; Nelsonioideae; Thunbergioideae

Synonyms
- Avicenniaceae Miq., nom. cons.; Justiciaceae Raf.; Mendonciaceae Bremek.; Meyeniaceae Sreem.; Nelsoniaceae Sreem.; Thunbergiaceae Lilja

= Acanthaceae =

Acanthaceae Temporal range: Miocene-Present ~22–0 Ma May extend into the Maastrichtian

Family of flowering plants comprising the acanthus

Acanthaceae (/ækænˈθeɪsiːˌaɪ, -siˌi/) is a family (the acanthus family) of dicotyledonous flowering plants containing almost 250 genera and about 2500 species. Most are tropical herbs, shrubs, or twining vines; some are epiphytes. Only a few species are distributed in temperate regions. The four main centres of distribution are Indonesia and Malaysia, Africa, Brazil, and Central America. Representatives of the family can be found in nearly every habitat, including dense or open forests, scrublands, wet fields and valleys, sea coast and marine areas, swamps, and mangrove forests.

== Description ==
Plants in this family have simple, opposite, decussated leaves with entire (or sometimes toothed, lobed, or spiny) margins, and without stipules. The leaves may contain cystoliths, calcium carbonate concretions, seen as streaks on the surface.

The flowers are perfect, zygomorphic to nearly actinomorphic, and arranged in an inflorescence that is either a spike, raceme, or cyme. Typically, a colorful bract subtends each flower; in some species, the bract is large and showy. The calyx usually has four or five lobes; the corolla tubular, two-lipped or five-lobed; stamens number either two or four, arranged in pairs and inserted on the corolla, and the ovary is superior and bicarpellated, with axile placentation.

The fruit is a two-celled capsule, dehiscing somewhat explosively. In most species, the seeds are attached to a small, hooked stalk (a modified funiculus called a jaculator or a retinaculum) that ejects them from the capsule. This trait is shared by all members of the clade Acanthoideae. A 1995 study of seed expulsion in Acanthaceae used high speed video pictures to show that retinacula propel seeds away from the parent plant when the fruits dehisce, thereby helping the plant gain maximum seed dispersal range.

A species well known to temperate gardeners is bear's breeches (Acanthus mollis), a herbaceous perennial plant with big leaves and flower spikes up to 2 m tall. Tropical genera familiar to gardeners include Thunbergia and Justicia.

Avicennia, a genus of mangrove trees, usually placed in Verbenaceae or in its own family, Avicenniaceae, is included in Acanthaceae by the Angiosperm Phylogeny Group on the basis of molecular phylogenetic studies that show it to be associated with this family.

== Medicinal uses ==
Traditionally the most important part use in Acanthaceae is the leaves and they are used externally for wounds. Some research has indicated that Acanthaceae possess antifungal, cytotoxic, anti-inflammatory, anti-pyretic, antioxidant, insecticidal, hepatoprotective, immunomodulatory, anti-platelet aggregation and anti-viral potential.

For instance, Acanthus ilicifolius, whose chemical composition has been heavily researched, is widely used in ethnopharmaceutical applications, including in Indian and Chinese traditional medicine. Various parts of Acanthus ilicifolius have been used to treat asthma, diabetes, leprosy, hepatitis, snake bites, and rheumatoid arthritis. The leaves of Acanthus ebracteatus, noted for their antioxidant properties, are used for making Thai herbal tea in Thailand and Indonesia.

== Phytochemistry ==
Phytochemical reports on family Acanthaceae are glycosides, flavonoids, benzonoids, phenolic compounds, naphthoquinone and triterpenoids.

== Overview of systematics ==
Since the first comprehensive classification of Acanthaceae in 1847 by Nees, there have been a few major revisions presented since for the whole family.

Lindau, in 1895, divided the family into the subfamilies Mendoncioideae, Thunbergioideae, Nelsonioideae, and Acanthoideae. Critically, Mendoncioideae, Thunbergioideae, and Nelsonioideae do not possess retinaculate fruits—and it is this distinction, between classifying Acanthaceae into a family that includes those clades with non-retinaculate fruits and one that excludes them, that still persists to the modern day.

Bremekamp, in 1965, presented a classification of Acanthaceae that differed from that of Lindau, for his Acanthaceae excluded genera that lack retinaculate fruits. He placed Nelsonioideae within Scrophulariaceae, classified Thunbergiaceae and Mendonciaceae as distinct families and divided his Acanthaceae into two groups (Acanthoideae and Ruelloideae) based on the presence or absence of cystoliths, articulate stems, monothecate anthers, and colpate pollen.

In Scotland and Vollesen's 2000 study, they accepted 221 genera and detailed five major groups within Acanthaceae s.s. (that is, those possessing retinaculate fruits), which is equivalent to Acanthoideae Link sensu Lindau 1895. Out of those 221 genera, they placed 201 of them into seven infrafamilial taxa of Acanthaceae, leaving only 20 unplaced.

In the current understanding of Acanthaceae, Acanthaceae s.s. includes only those clades with retinaculate fruits (that is, Acantheae, Barlerieae, Andrographideae, Whitfieldeae, Ruellieae, and Justiceae), while Acanthaceae s.l. includes those clades as well as Thunbergioideae, Nelsonioideae, and Avicennia.

== Dating the Acanthaceae lineage ==
Much research, using both molecular data and fossils, has been conducted in recent years regarding the dating and distribution of the Acanthaceae and Lamiales lineage, although there still remains some ambiguity.

In a 2004 study on the molecular phylogenetic dating of asterid flowering plants, researchers estimated 106 million years (MY) for the stem lineage of Lamiales, 67 MY for the stem lineage of Acanthaceae, and 54 MY for the crown node of Acanthaceae (that is, the age of extant lineages with the family). These estimates are older than those based on fossils that can confidently be assigned to Lamiales, which are middle Eocene in age, c. 48–37 MY. Palynomorphs that definitively show the existence of Acanthaceae are known from the upper Miocene, with the oldest c. 22 MY.

== Genera ==
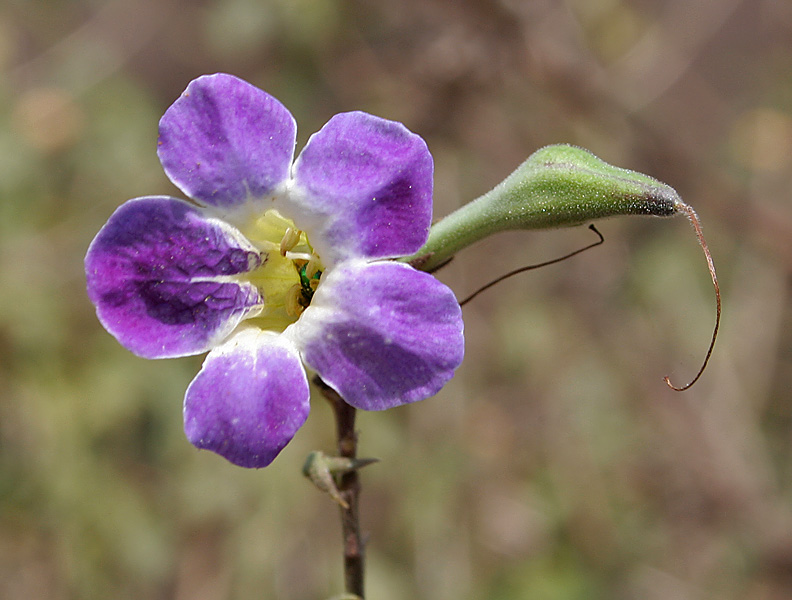
Chinese violet (Asystasia gangetica)

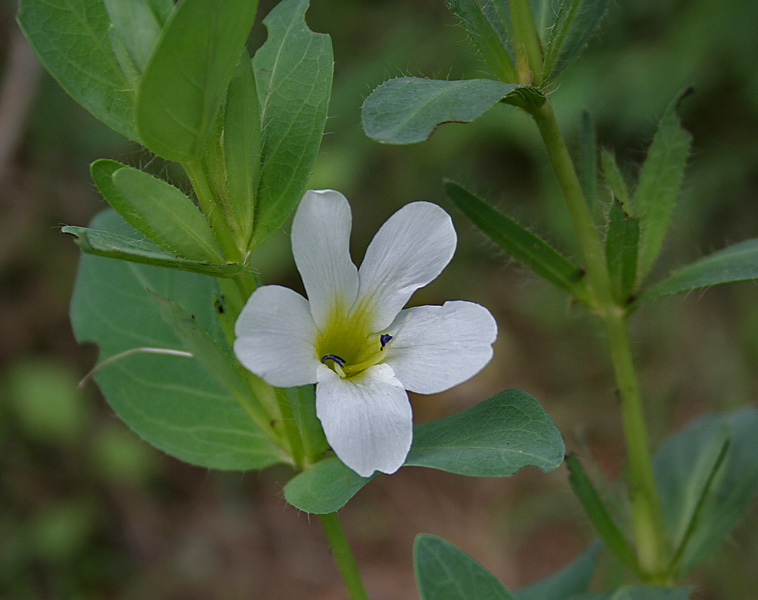
Barleria sp.

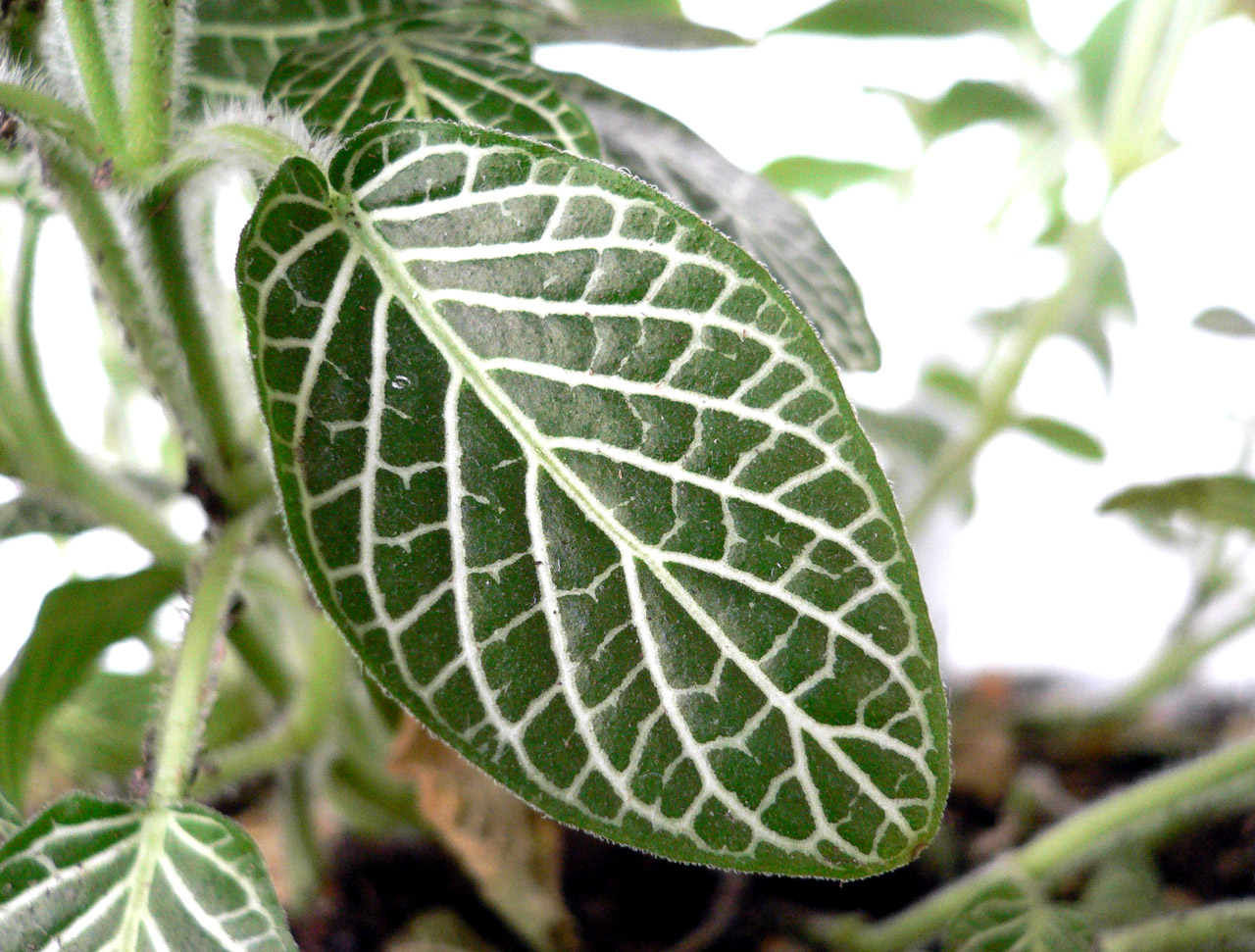
Leaf of the nerve plant (Fittonia verschaffeltii)

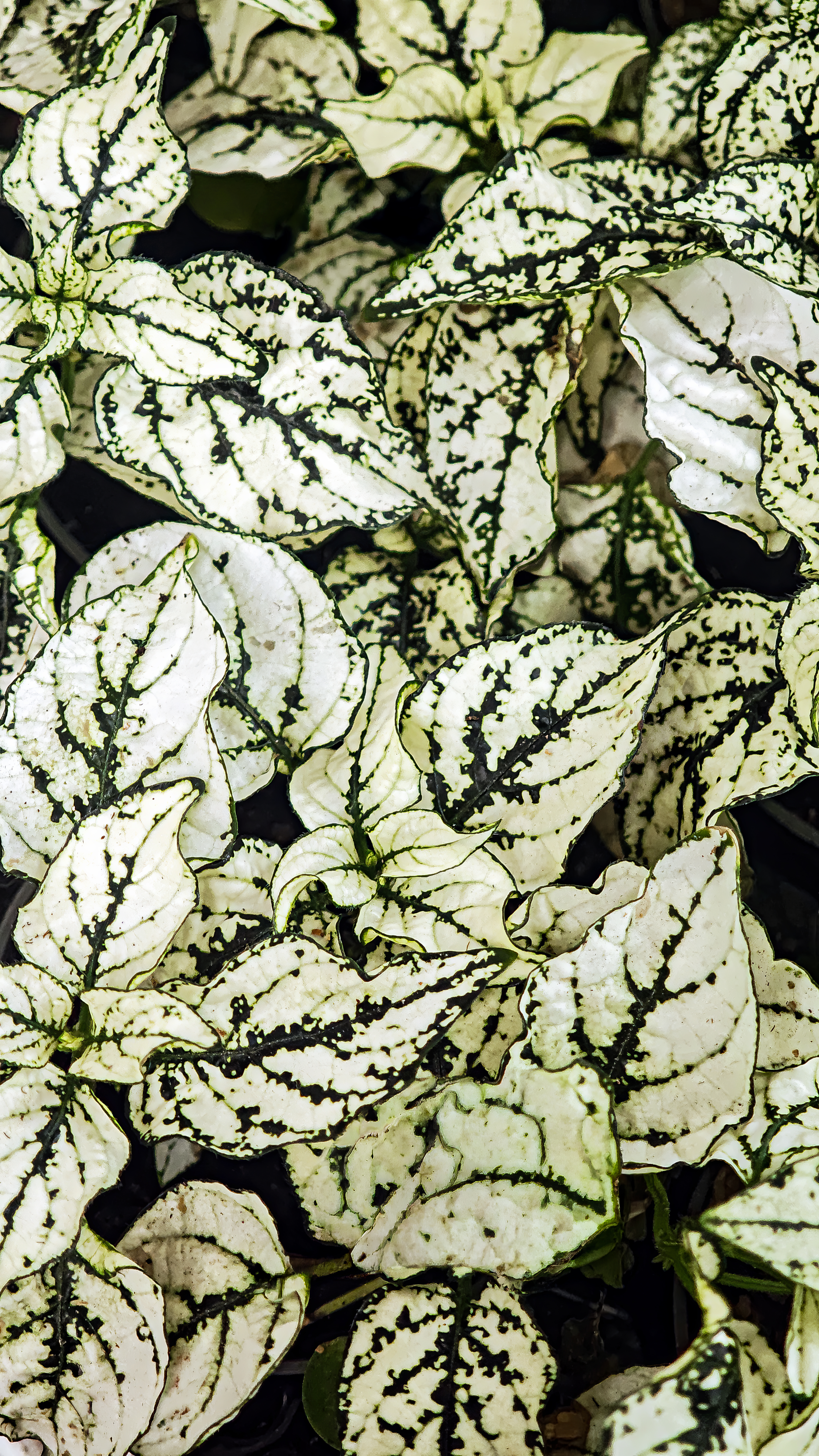
Polka dot plant (Hypoestes phyllostachya)

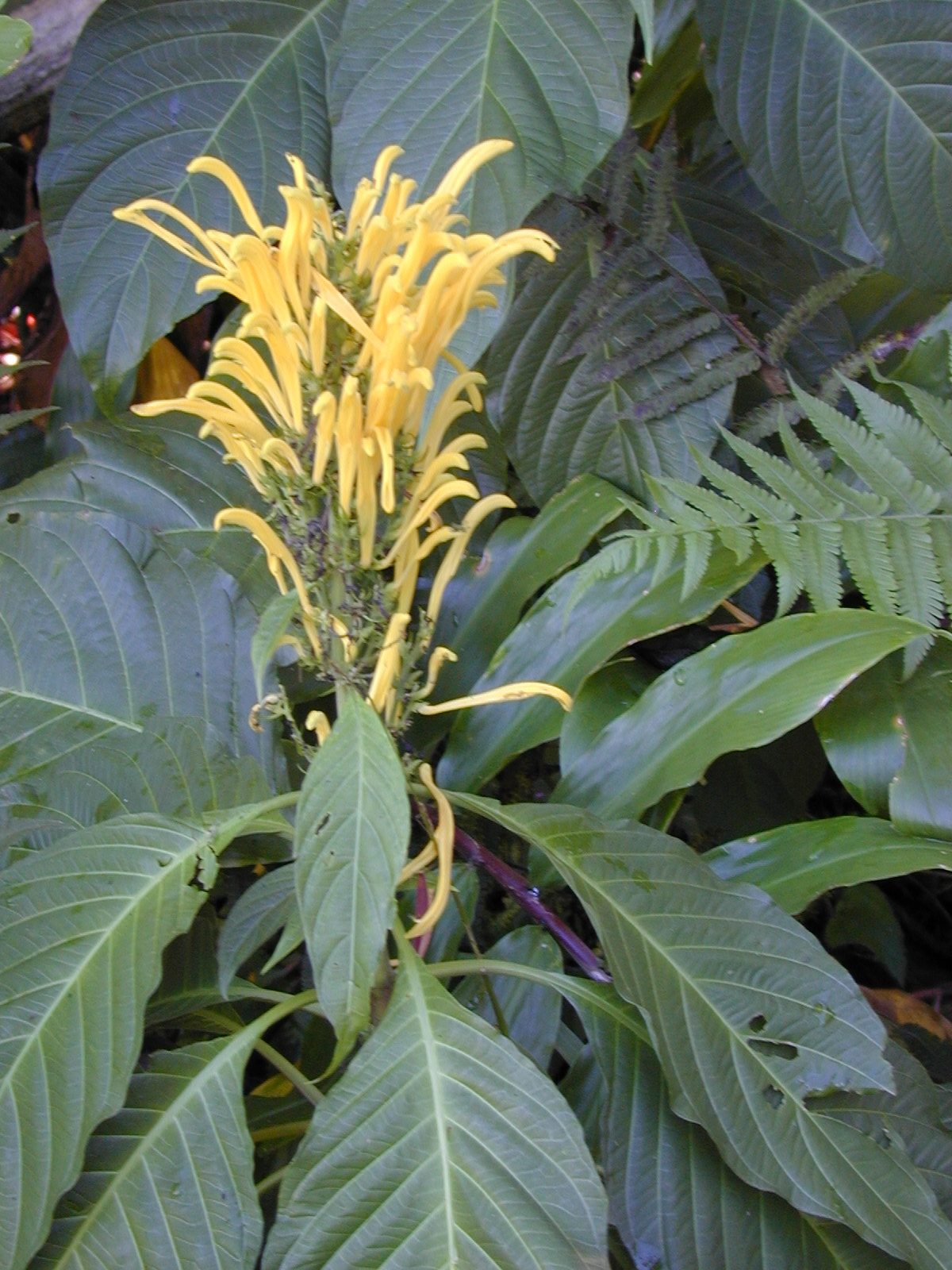
Justicia aurea

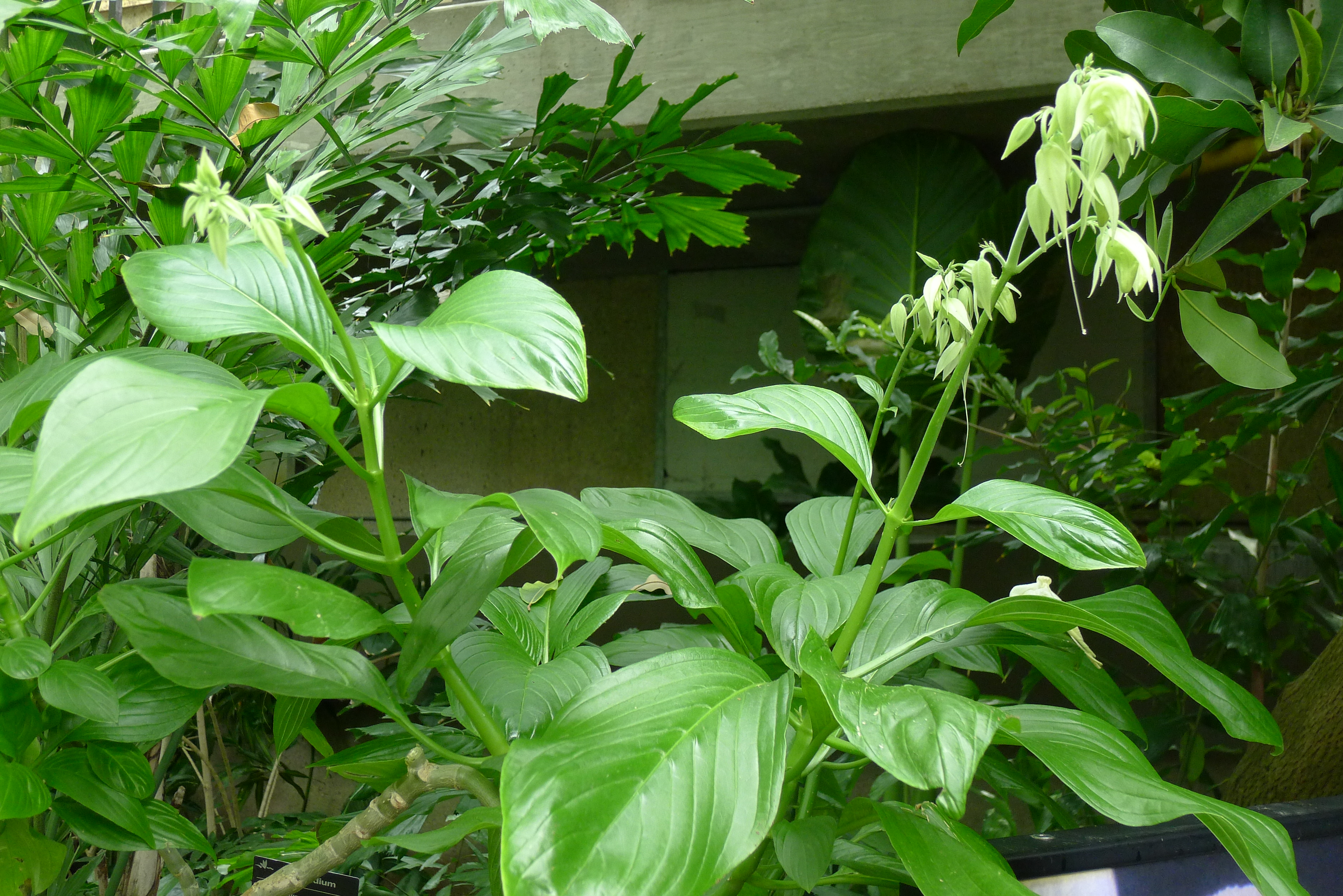
Louteridium panemensis

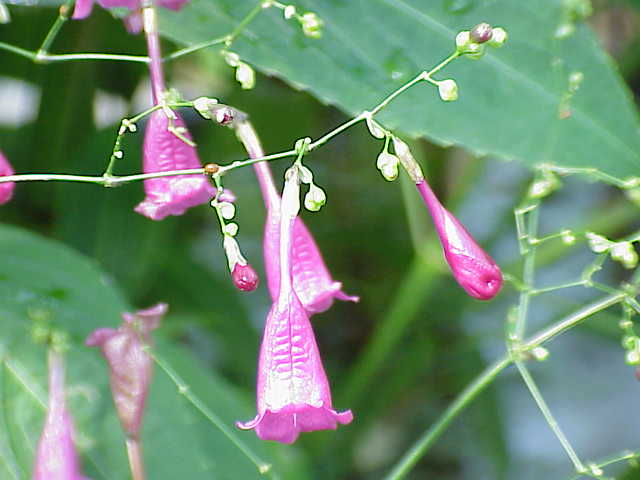
Strobilanthes hamiltoniana

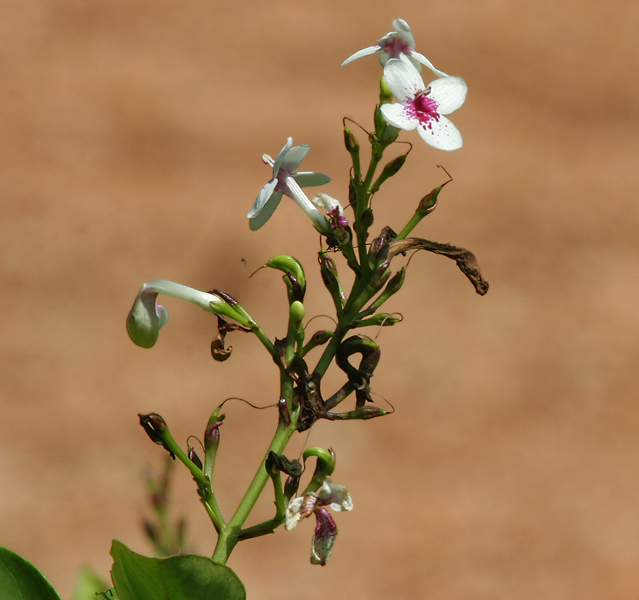
Pseuderanthemum maculatum

Popping pod (Ruellia tuberosa )

Rostellularia sp.

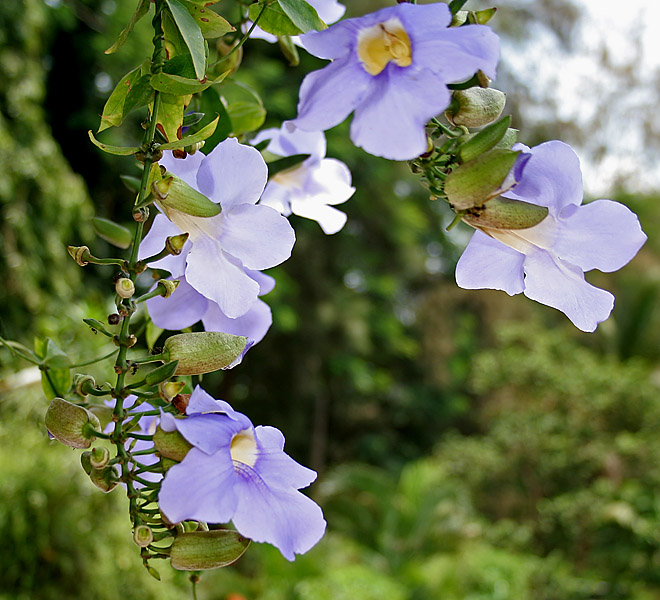
Thunbergia laurifolia

As of 2 December 2021, the Germplasm Resources Information Network accepts 217 genera. As of July 2025, Plants of the World Online accepts 208 genera.

- Acanthopale C.B.Clarke
- Acanthopsis Harv.
- Acanthostelma Bidgood & Brummitt – synonym of Crabbea
- Acanthura Lindau – synonym of Lepidagathis
- Acanthus L. ('bear's breech/britches')
- Achyrocalyx Benoist - synonym of Stenandriopsis
- Aechmanthera – synonym of Strobilanthes
- Adhatoda Mill. – synonym of Justicia
- Afrofittonia Lindau
- Ambongia Benoist
- Ancistranthus Lindau ('desert honeysuckle')
- Andrographis Wall. ex Nees ('false waterwillow')
- Angkalanthus Balf.f.
- Anisacanthus Nees
- Anisosepalum E.Hossain
- Anisostachya Nees
- Anisotes Nees
- Anomacanthus R.D.Good
- Apassalus Kobuski – synonym of Dyschoriste
- Aphanandrium Lindau
- Aphanosperma T.F.Daniel
- Aphelandra R.Br. (including A. squarrosa, 'zebra plant')
- Aphelandrella Mildbr. – synonym of Aphelandra
- Ascotheca Heine
- Asystasia Blume
- Asystasiella Lindau – synonym of Asystasia
- Avicennia L.
- Aymoreana Braz, T.F.Daniel & Kiel
- Ballochia Balf.f.
- Barleria L. ('bush violets')
- Barleriola Oerst
- Benoicanthus Heine & A.Raynal – synonym of Ruellia
- Blechum P.Browne – synonym of Ruellia
- Blepharis Juss.
- Borneacanthus Bremek.
- Boutonia DC.
- Brachystephanus Nees
- Bravaisia DC.
- Brillantaisia P.Beauv.
- Brunoniella Bremek.
- Calacanthus T.Anderson ex Benth. & Hook.f.
- Calophanoides (C.B.Clarke) Ridl. – synonym of Justicia
- Calycacanthus K.Schum.
- Camarotea Scott-Elliot
- Carlowrightia A.Gray (wrightwort)
- Celerina Benoist
- Cephalacanthus Lindau
- Cephalophis Vollesen
- Chalarothyrsus Lindau
- Chamaeranthemum Nees
- Championella Bremek. – synonym of Strobilanthes
- Champluviera I.Darbysh., T.F.Daniel & Kiel
- Chileranthemum Oerst.
- Chlamydacanthus Lindau
- Chlamydocardia Lindau
- Chlamydostachya Mildbr. – synonym of Anisotes
- Chorisochora Vollesen
- Chroesthes Benoist
- Clinacanthus Nees
- Clistax Mart.
- Codonacanthus Nees
- Conocalyx Benoist
- Corymbostachys Lindau – synonym of Anisostachya
- Cosmianthemum Bremek.
- Crabbea Harv.
- Crossandra Salisb.
- Crossandrella C.B.Clarke
- Cuenotia Rizzini
- Cyclacanthus S.Moore
- Cylindrosolenium Lindau – synonym of Stenostephanus
- Cynarospermum Vollesen
- Cyphacanthus Leonard
- Dactylostegium Nees synonym of Dicliptera
- Danguya Benoist – synonym of Anisotes
- Dasytropis Urb.
- Dianthera L. (synonyms: Amphiscopia, Centrilla, Diplanthera, Jungia)
- Diceratotheca J.R.I.Wood & Scotland
- Dichazothece Lindau
- Dicladanthera F.Muell.
- Dicliptera Juss. (Foldwing)
- Didyplosandra Wight ex Bremek. – synonym of Strobilanthes
- Dipteracanthus Nees – synonym of Ruellia
- Dinteracanthus C.B.Clarke ex Schinz
- Dischistocalyx T.Anderson ex Benth. & Hook.f.
- Dolichostachys Benoist
- Drejera Nees – synonym of Thyrsacanthus
- Drejerella Lindau – synonym of Justicia
- Duosperma Dayton
- Dyschoriste Nees (snakeherb)
- Ecbolium Kurz
- Echinacanthus Nees
- Elytraria Michx. (scalystem)
- Encephalosphaera Lindau – synonym of Aphelandra
- Epiclastopelma Lindau – synonym of Mimulopsis
- Eranthemum L.
- Eremomastax Lindau
- Eusiphon Benoist – synonym of Ruellia
- Filetia Miq.
- Fittonia Coem. (nerve plants)
- Forcipella Baill.
- Forsythiopsis Baker – synonym of Oplonia
- Geissomeria Lindl. – synonym of Aphelandra
- Glossochilus Nees
- Golaea Chiov. – synonym of Crabbea
- Graphandra J.B.Imlay
- Graptophyllum Nees
- Gymnophragma Lindau
- Gymnostachyum Nees
- Gynocraterium Bremek. – synonym of Staurogyne
- Gypsacanthus E.J.Lott et al.
- Haplanthodes Kuntze
- Haplanthus Nees
- Harnieria (formerly Justicia) Solms
- Harpochilus Nees
- Hemiadelphis Nees – synonym of Hygrophila
- Hemigraphis Nees
- Henrya Nees
- Herpetacanthus Nees
- Heteradelphia Lindau
- Holographis Nees
- Hoverdenia Nees
- Hulemacanthus S.Moore
- Hygrophila R.Br. ('swampweed')
- Hypoestes ('polka-dot plants'; includes Periestes)
- Ichthyostoma Hedrén & Vollesen
- Ionacanthus Benoist – synonym of Mellera
- Isoglossa Oerst.
- Isotheca Turrill
- Jadunia Lindau
- Juruasia Lindau – synonym of Herpetacanthus
- Justicia L. (justicia, 'water-willow', 'shrimp plant')
- Kalbreyeriella Lindau – synonym of Stenostephanus
- Kenyacanthus I.Darbysh. & Kiel
- Kosmosiphon Lindau
- Kudoacanthus Hosok.
- Lankesteria Lindl.
- Lasiocladus Bojer ex Nees
- Leandriella Benoist
- Lepidagathis Willd.
- Leptosiphonium F.Muell.
- Leptostachya Nees
- Liberatia Rizzini
- Linariantha B.L.Burtt & R.M.Sm.
- Lophostachys Pohl – synonym of Lepidagathis
- Louteridium S.Watson
- Lychniothyrsus Lindau – synonym of Ruellia
- Mackaya Harv.
- Marcania J.B.Imlay
- Mcdadea E.A.Tripp & I.Darbysh.
- Megalochlamys Lindau
- Megalostoma Leonard – synonym of Justicia
- Megaskepasma Lindau
- Meiosperma Raf.
- Melittacanthus S.Moore
- Mellera S.Moore
- Mendoncia Vand.
- Metarungia Baden
- Mexacanthus T.F.Daniel
- Meyenia Nees
- Mimulopsis Schweinf.
- Mirandea Rzed.
- Monechma Hochst. – synonym of Meiosperma
- Monothecium Hochst.
- Morsacanthus Rizzini
- Nelsonia R.Br.
- Neohallia Hemsl. – synonym of Justicia
- Neriacanthus Benth.
- Neuracanthus Nees
- Nicoteba Lindau
- Odontonema Nees ('toothedthread')
- Ophiorrhiziphyllon Kurz – synonym of Staurogyne
- Oplonia Raf.
- Oreacanthus Benth. – synonym of Brachystephanus
- Orophochilus Lindau – synonym of Aphelandra
- Pachystachys Nees
- Pachystrobilus Bremek. – synonym of Strobilanthes
- Pararuellia Bremek. & Nann.-Bremek.
- Pelecostemon Leonard – synonym of Justicia
- Pentstemonacanthus Nees – synonym of Ruellia
- Perenideboles Ram.Goyena – synonym of Megaskepasma
- Pericalypta Benoist
- Peristrophe Nees – synonym of Dicliptera
- Petalidium Nees
- Phaulopsis Willd.
- Phialacanthus Benth.
- Phidiasia Urb. – synonym of Odontonema
- Phlogacanthus Nees
- Physacanthus Benth.
- Podorungia Baill.
- Pogonospermum Hochst.
- Poikilacanthus Lindau
- Polylychnis Bremek.
- Populina Baill.
- Pranceacanthus Wassh.
- Pseudacanthopale Benoist
- Pseuderanthemum Radlk.
- Pseudocalyx Radlk.
- Pseudodicliptera Benoist
- Pseudoruellia Benoist – synonym of Ruellia
- Psilanthele Lindau
- Psiloesthes Benoist
- Ptyssiglottis T.Anderson
- Pulchranthus V.M.Baum et al.
- Pupilla Rizzini – synonym of Justicia
- Razisea Oerst. – synonym of Stenostephanus
- Rhaphidospora Nees
- Rhinacanthus Nees
- Rhombochlamys Lindau – synonym of Aphelandra
- Ritonia Benoist
- Rostellularia Rchb.
- Ruellia L. ('wild petunia')
- Ruelliopsis C.B.Clarke
- Rungia Nees
- Ruspolia Lindau
- Ruttya Harv.
- × Ruttyruspolia A.Meeuse & de Wet (Ruspolia × Ruttya)
- Saintpauliopsis Staner
- Salpinctium T.J.Edwards – synonym of Asystasia
- Salpixantha Hook.
- Samuelssonia Urb. & Ekman
- Sanchezia Ruiz & Pav.
- Santapaua N.P.Balakr. & Subr. – synonym of Hygrophila
- Sapphoa Urb.
- Satanocrater Schweinf.
- Sautiera Decne. – synonym of Dyschoriste
- Schaueria Nees
- Schaueriopsis Champl. & I.Darbysh.
- Schwabea Endl. – unplaced
- Sclerochiton Harv.
- Sebastiano-schaueria Nees
- Sericospora Nees – unplaced
- Siphonoglossa Oerst. – synonym of Justicia
- Spathacanthus Baill.
- Sphacanthus Benoist
- Sphinctacanthus Benth.
- Spirostigma Nees – synonym of Ruellia
- Stachyacanthus Nees
- Standleyacanthus Leonard – synonym of Herpetacanthus
- Staurogyne Wall. (including S. repens)
- Steirosanchezia Lindau – synonym of Sanchezia
- Stenandriopsis S.Moore
- Stenandrium Nees (shaggytuft)
- Stenostephanus Nees
- Stenothyrsus C.B.Clarke
- Streblacanthus Kuntze
- Streptosiphon Mildbr.
- Strobilanthes Blume ('Chinese rain-bell', 'Persian shield')
- Strobilanthopsis S.Moore
- Styasasia S.Moore – synonym of Asystasia
- Suessenguthia Merxm.
- Symplectochilus Lindau
- Synchoriste Baill. – synonym of Lasiocladus
- Tabascina Baill.
- Taeniandra Bremek. – synonym of Strobilanthes
- Tarphochlamys Bremek. – synonym of Strobilanthes
- Teliostachya Nees – synonym of Lepidagathis
- Tessmanniacanthus Mildbr.
- Tetramerium Nees
- Theileamea Baill. – synonym of Chlamydacanthus
- Thunbergia Retz.
- Thyrsacanthus Moric.
- Thysanostigma J.B.Imlay
- Tremacanthus S.Moore – synonym of Ruellia
- Triaenanthus Nees – synonym of Strobilanthes
- Trichanthera Kunth
- Trichaulax Vollesen
- Trichocalyx Balf.f.
- Trichosanchezia Mildbr.
- Ulleria Bremek. – synonym of Ruellia
- Vavara Benoist
- Vindasia Benoist
- Warpuria Stapf – synonym of Podorungia
- Whitfieldia Hook.
- Wuacanthus Y.F.Deng, N.H.Xia & H.Peng
- Xantheranthemum Lindau
- Xerothamnella C.T.White
- Xylacanthus Aver. & K.S.Nguyen
- Yeatesia Small (Bractspike)
- Zygoruellia Baill.

=== Excluded genera ===
- Thomandersia Baill. → Thomandersiaceae

== Gallery ==
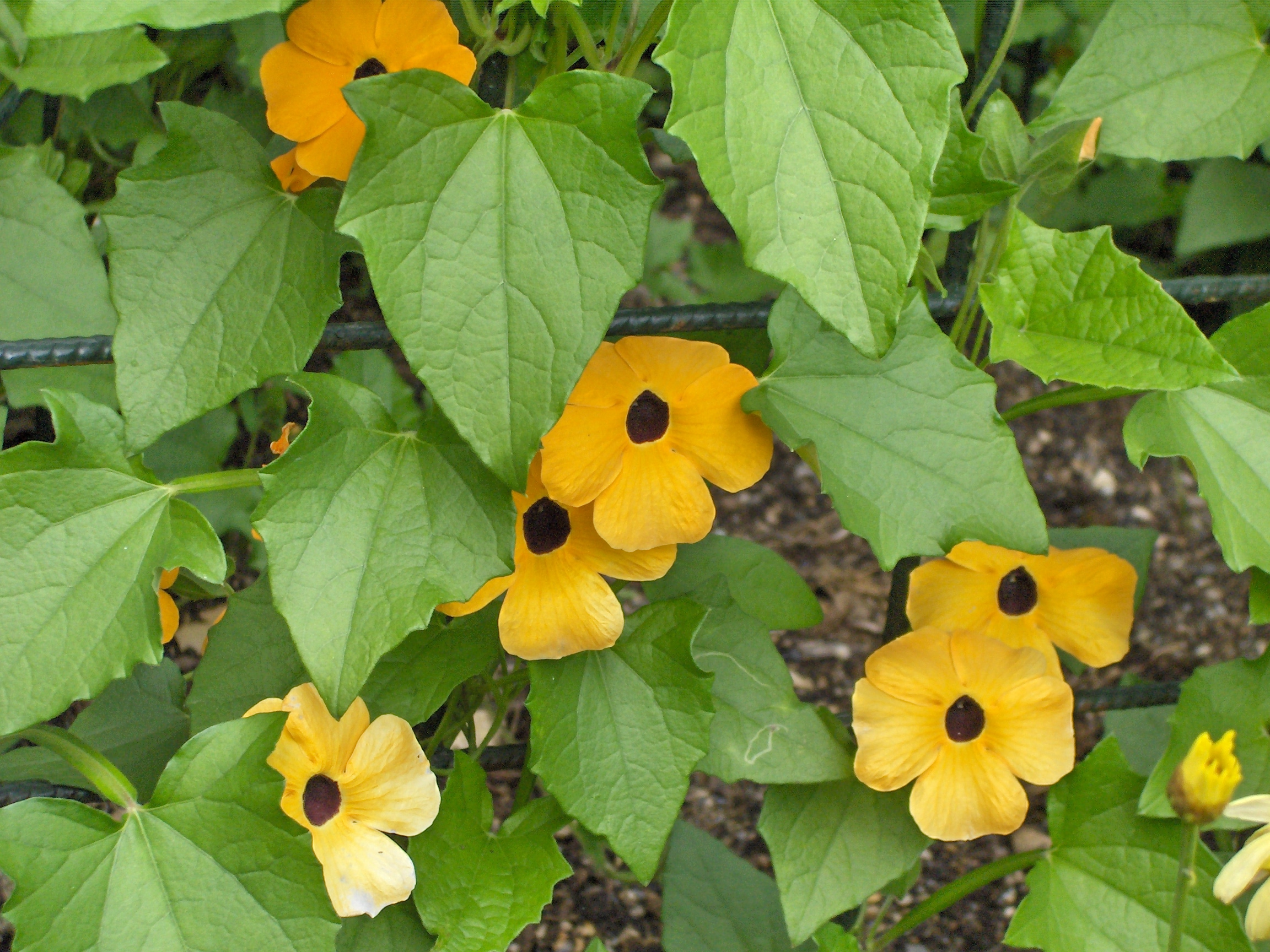

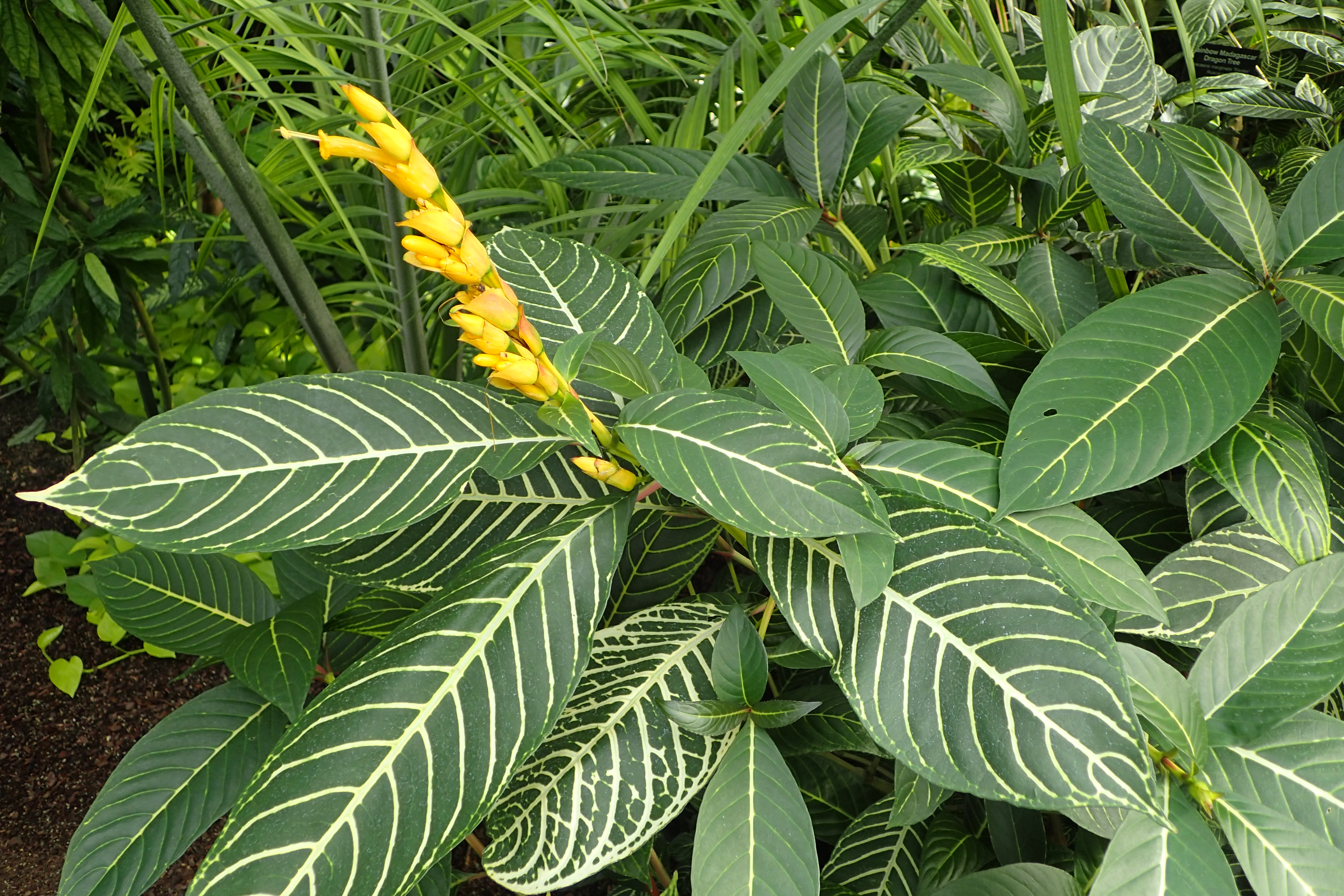

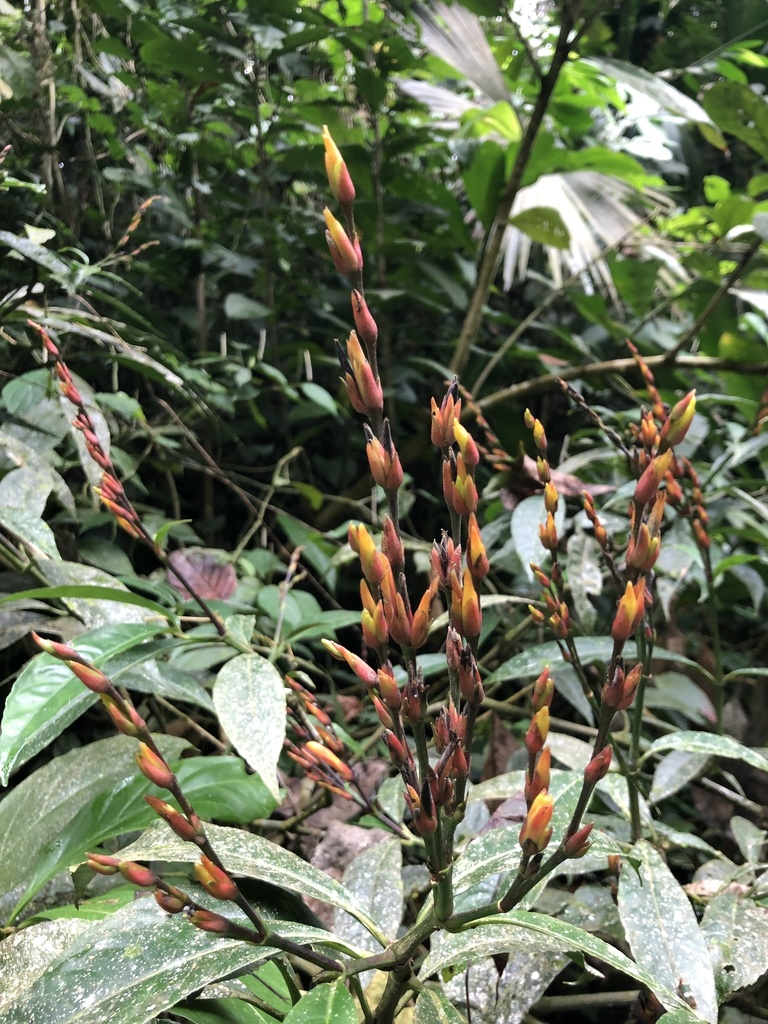

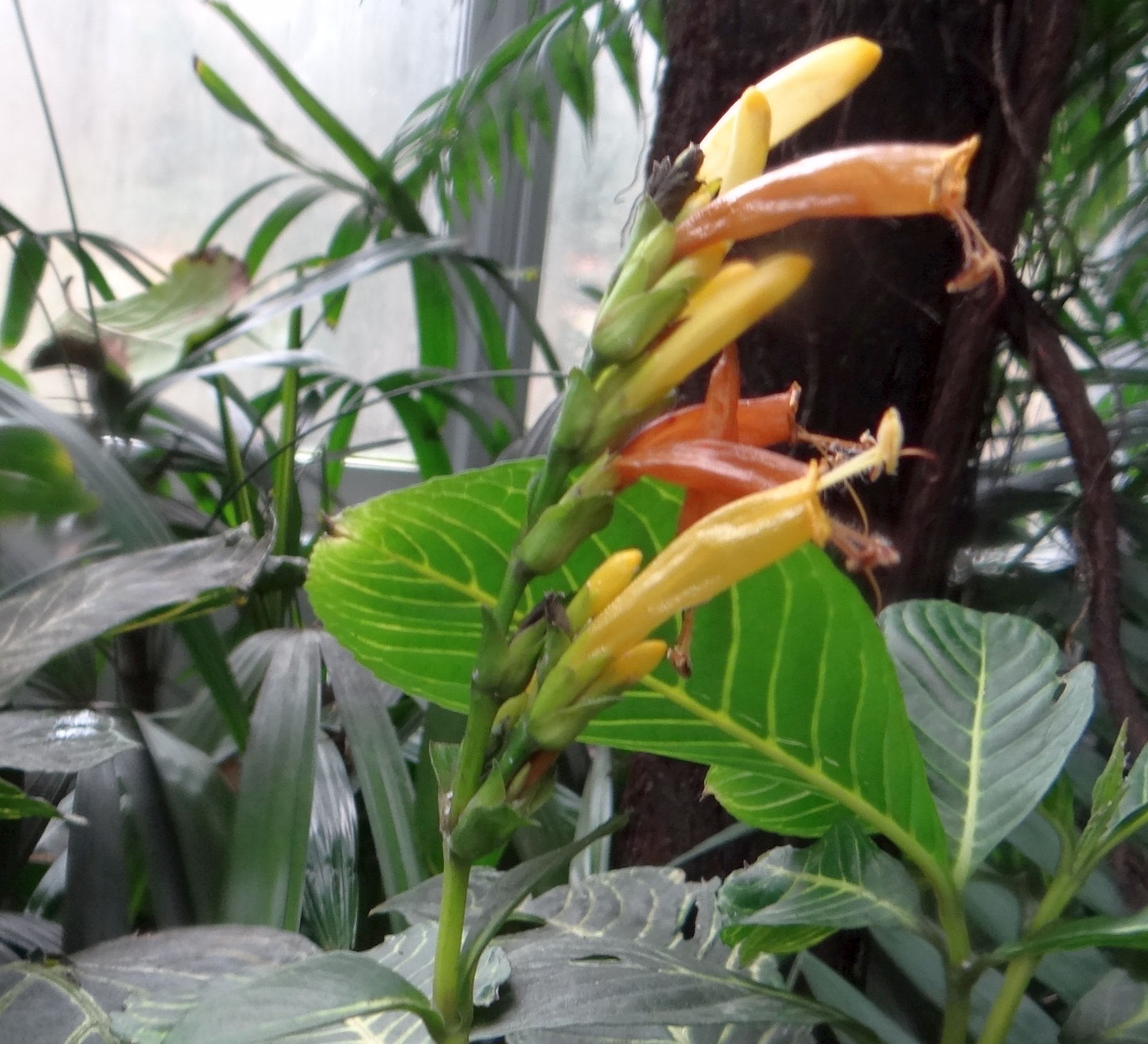

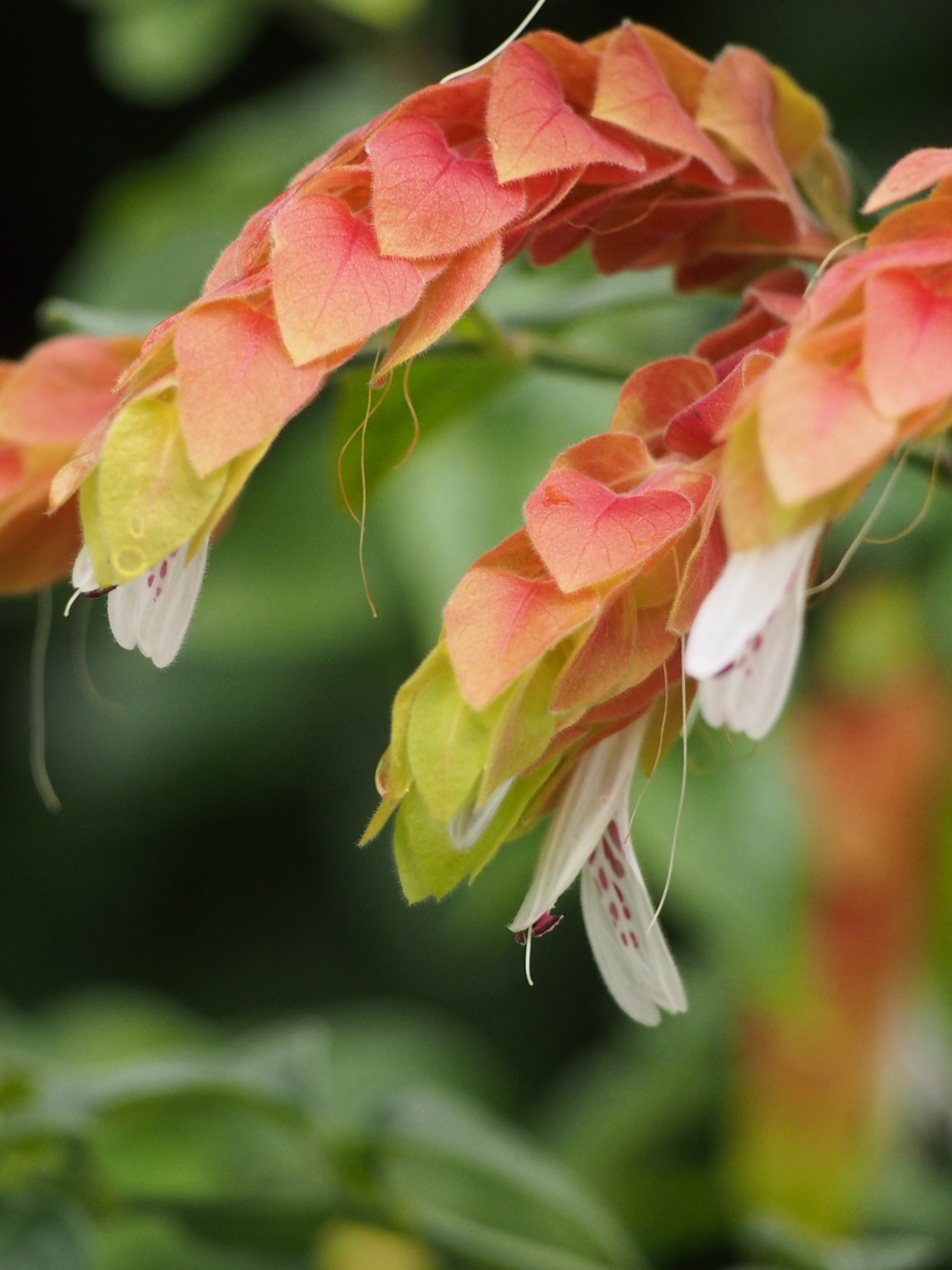

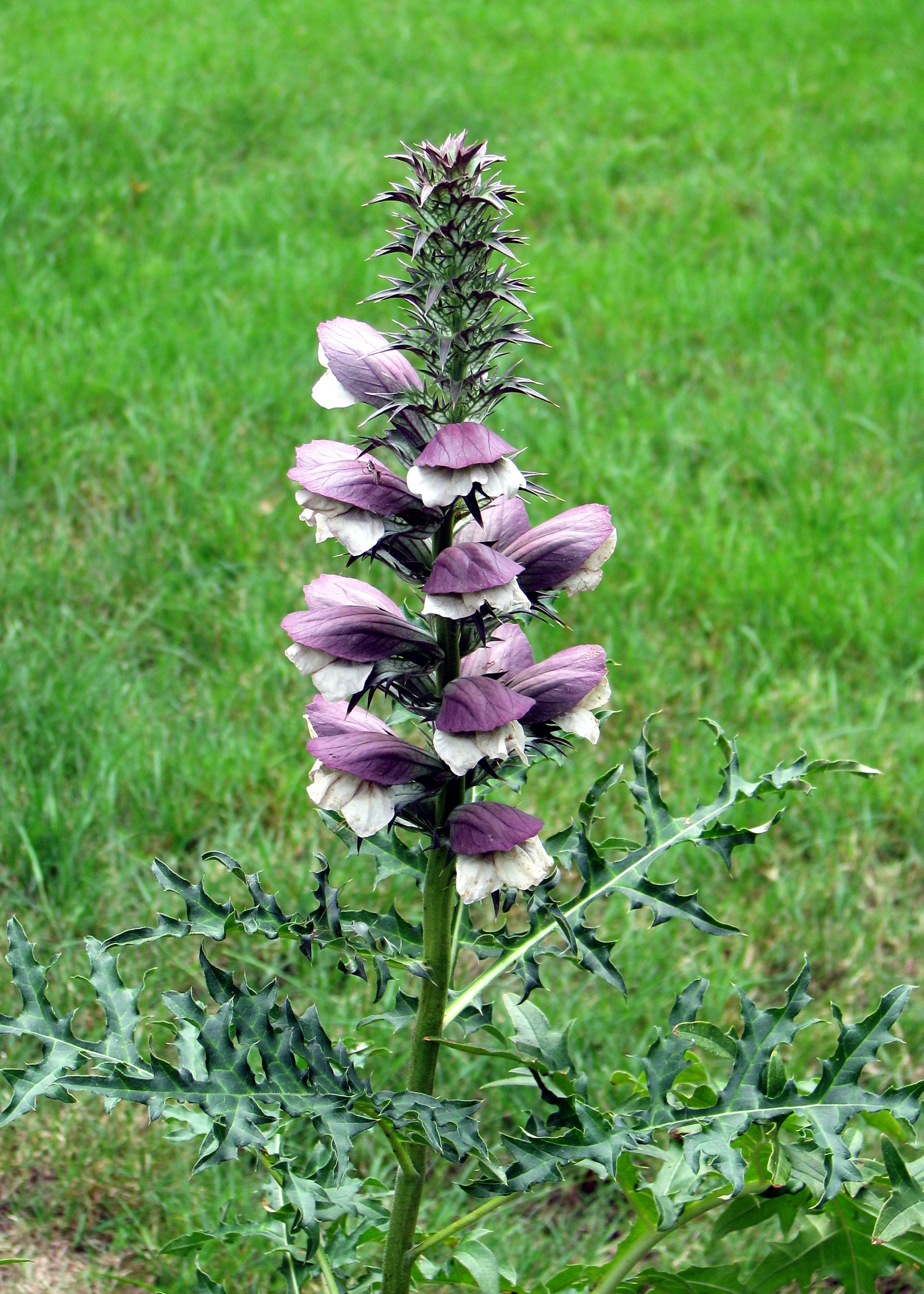

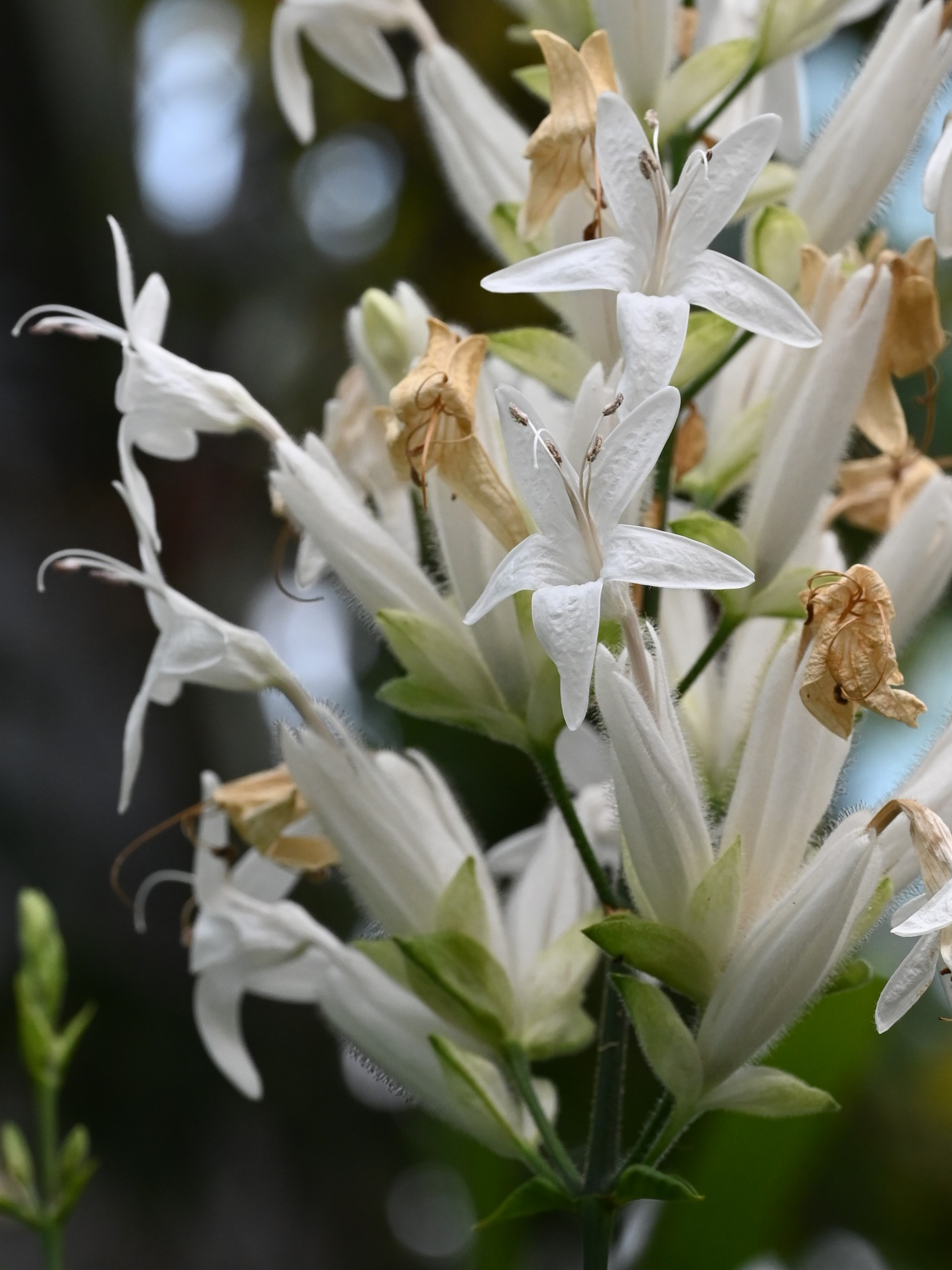

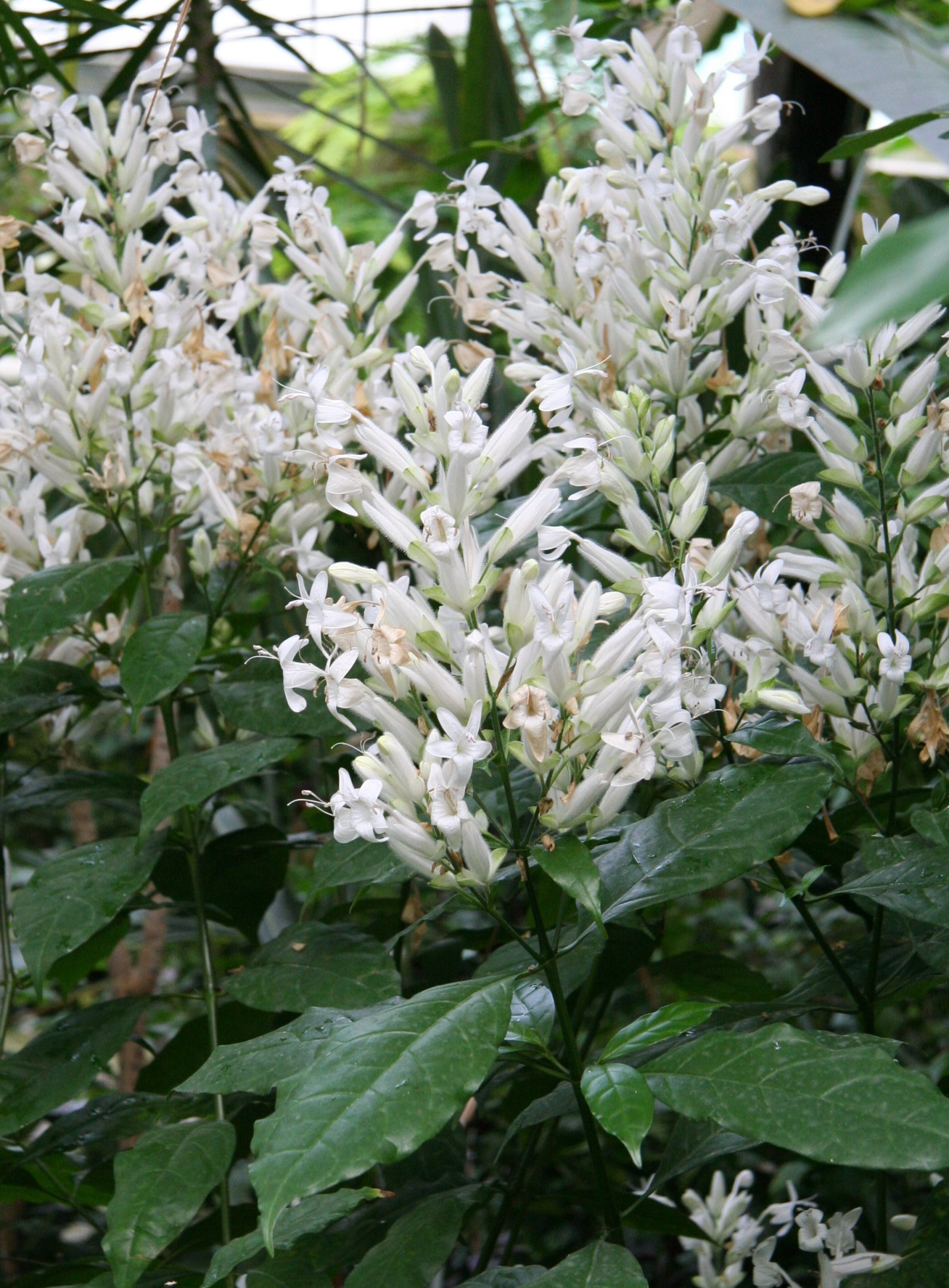
