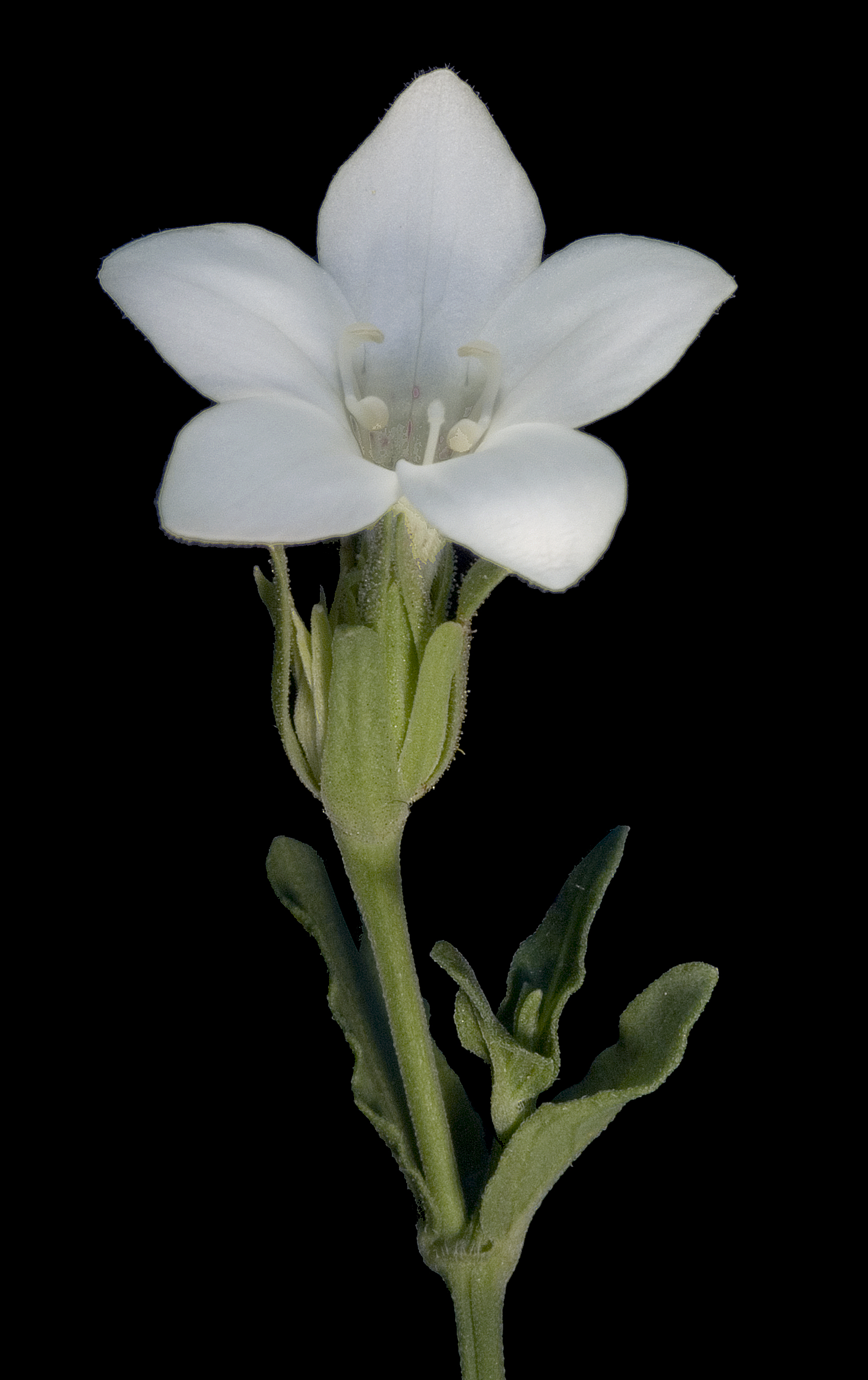
- Dicladanthera forrestii

Scientific classification
- Kingdom: Plantae
- Clade: Tracheophytes
- Clade: Angiosperms
- Clade: Eudicots
- Clade: Asterids
- Order: Lamiales
- Family: Acanthaceae
- Genus: Dicladanthera; F.Muell.

= Dicladanthera =

Genus of plants

Dicladanthera is a genus of flowering plants belonging to the family Acanthaceae.

Its native range is Northwestern Australia.

Species:

- Dicladanthera forrestii F.Muell.
- Dicladanthera glabra R.M.Barker
