= Schaueriopsis =

Scientific classification
- Kingdom: Plantae
- Clade: Tracheophytes
- Clade: Angiosperms
- Clade: Eudicots
- Clade: Asterids
- Order: Lamiales
- Family: Acanthaceae
- Genus: Schaueriopsis; Champl. & I.Darbysh. (2012)
- Species: S. variabilis

Binomial name
- Schaueriopsis variabilis Champl. & I.Darbysh. (2012)

Genus of flowering plants

Schaueriopsis variabilis is a species of flowering plant in the family Acanthaceae. It is the only species in the genus Schaueriopsis. It is a subshrub or shrub native to the east-central and eastern Democratic Republic of the Congo.
