= Ichthyostoma =

Scientific classification
- Kingdom: Plantae
- Clade: Tracheophytes
- Clade: Angiosperms
- Clade: Eudicots
- Clade: Asterids
- Order: Lamiales
- Family: Acanthaceae
- Genus: Ichthyostoma; Hedrén & Vollesen (1996 publ. 1997)
- Species: I. thulinii

Binomial name
- Ichthyostoma thulinii Hedrén & Vollesen (1996 publ. 1997)

Genus of flowering plants

Ichthyostoma thulinii is a species of flowering plant in the family Acanthaceae. It is a shrub native to southeastern Ethiopia and south-central Somalia, where it grows in desert and dry shrubland. It is the sole species in genus Ichthyostoma.
