= Xylacanthus laoticus =

Scientific classification
- Kingdom: Plantae
- Clade: Tracheophytes
- Clade: Angiosperms
- Clade: Eudicots
- Clade: Asterids
- Order: Lamiales
- Family: Acanthaceae
- Genus: Xylacanthus; Aver. & K.S.Nguyen
- Species: X. laoticus

Binomial name
- Xylacanthus laoticus Aver. & K.S.Nguyen

Species of flowering plant

Xylacanthus is a monotypic genus of flowering plants belonging to the family Acanthaceae. Its native range is Indo-China. It contains a single species, Xylacanthus laoticus.
