= Fever root =

Fever root is a common name for several plants and may refer to:

- Ruellia tuberosa, native to Central America
- Triosteum
