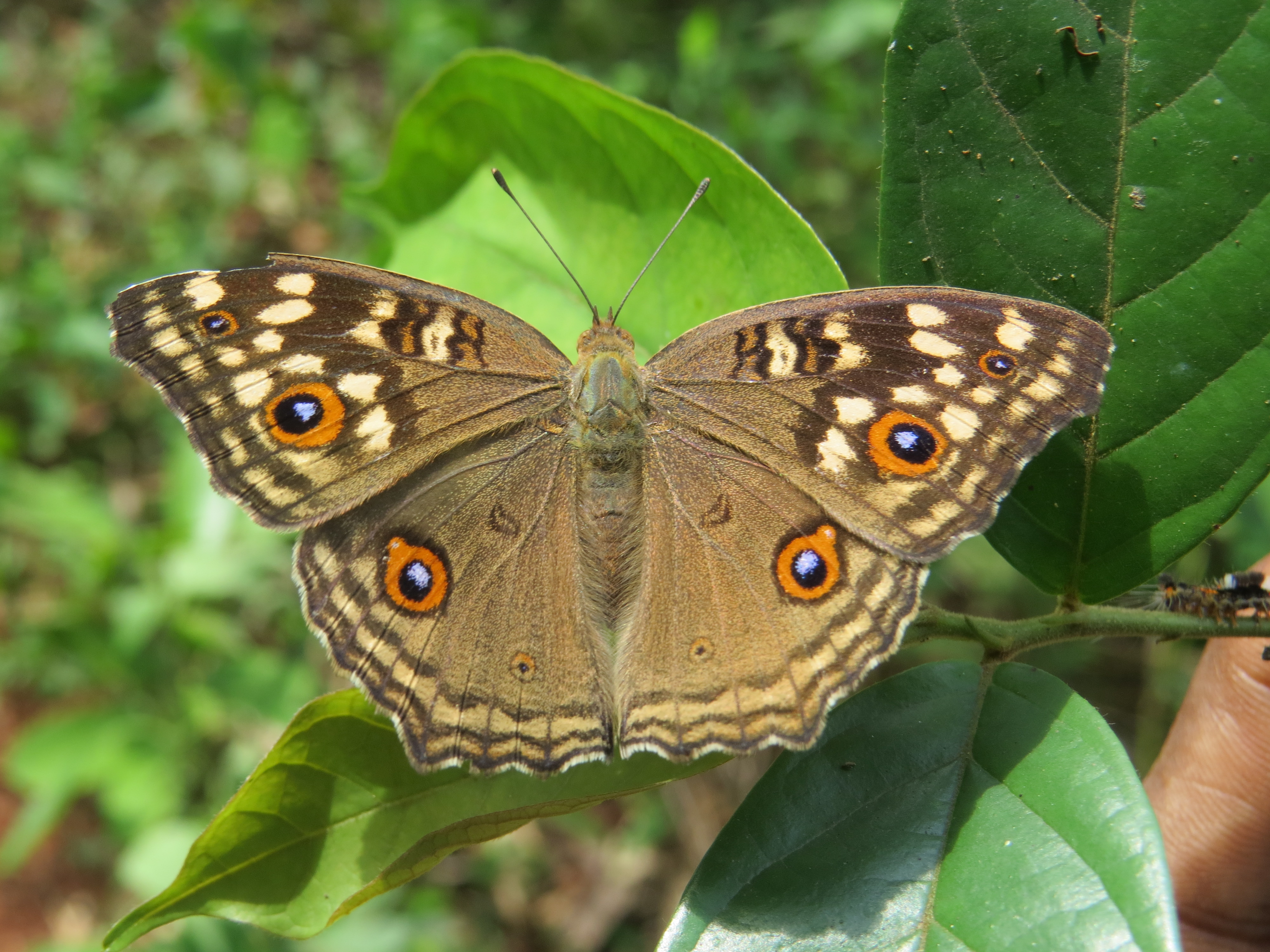
- Wet-season form, upperside
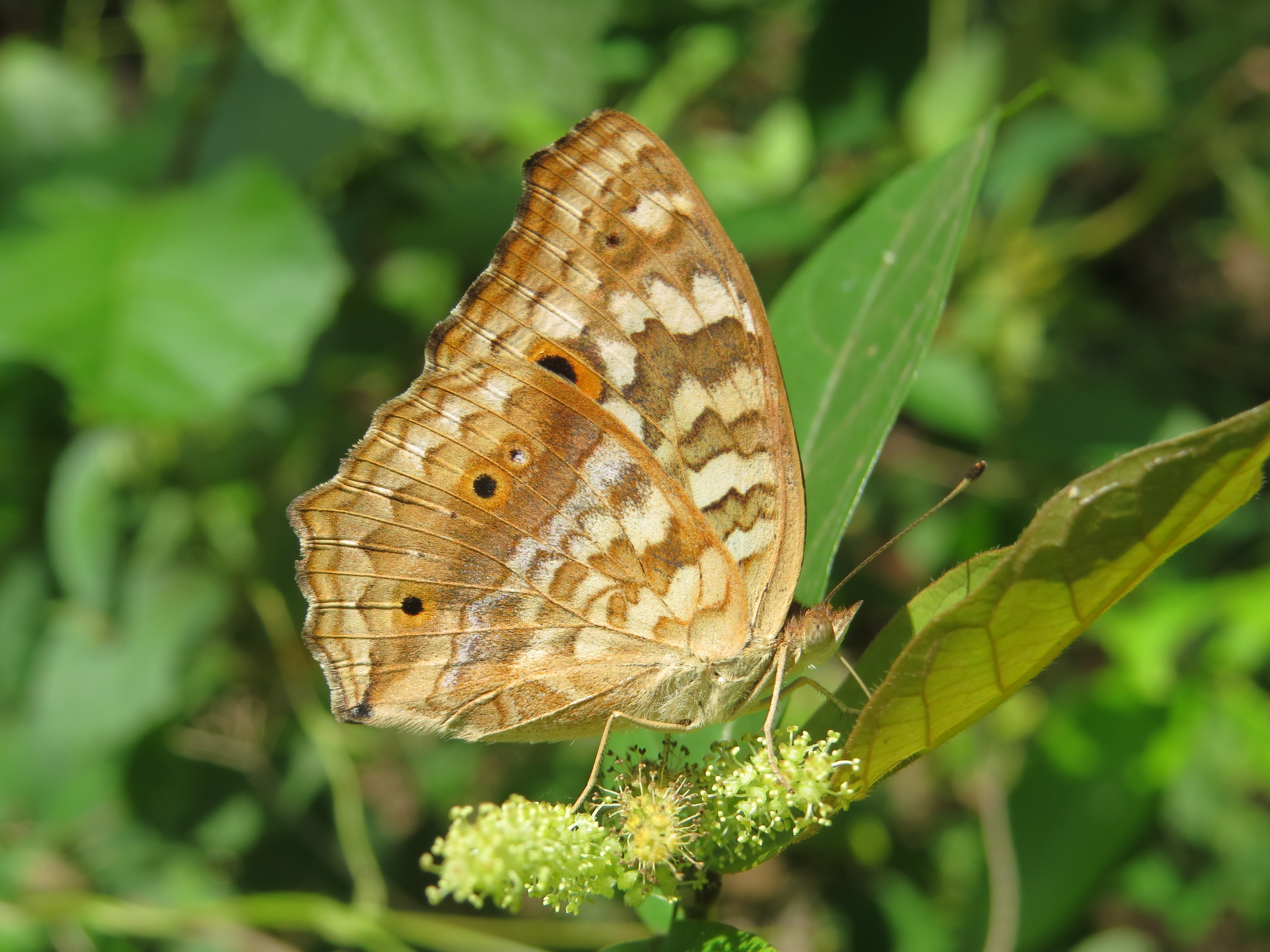
- Wet-season form, underside

Scientific classification
- Kingdom: Animalia
- Phylum: Arthropoda
- Class: Insecta
- Order: Lepidoptera
- Family: Nymphalidae
- Genus: Junonia
- Species: J. lemonias

Binomial name
- Junonia lemonias (Linnaeus, 1758)

Subspecies
- J. l. lemonias; J. l. vaisya (Fruhstorfer, 1912)

Synonyms
- Papilio lemonias Linnaeus, 1758; Papilio aonis Linnaeus, 1758; Precis lemonias Fruhstorfer, 1912

= Junonia lemonias =

Lemon pansy

Species of butterfly

Junonia lemonias, the lemon pansy, is a common nymphalid butterfly found in Cambodia and South Asia. It is found in gardens, fallow land, and open wooded areas.

== Description ==
It is brown with numerous eyespots as well as black and lemon-yellow spots and lines on the upperside of the wings. The underside is a dull brown, with a number of wavy lines and spots in varying shades of brown and black. There is also an eyespot on the lower side of the forewing. The wet- and dry-season forms differ considerably in coloration and even shape. In the wet-season form the markings are distinct and vivid and the wing shape is a little more rounded. In the dry-season form the markings are obscure and pale especially on the underside and the wing margin is more angular and jagged. This helps it camouflage in the dried leaf litter.

The lemon pansy is a very active butterfly and can be seen basking with its wings open facing the sun. It sits very low to the ground and can be approached easily. It feeds with its wings half open. It is a fairly strong flier and flies close to the ground with rapid wingbeats and often returns to settle back in the same spots.

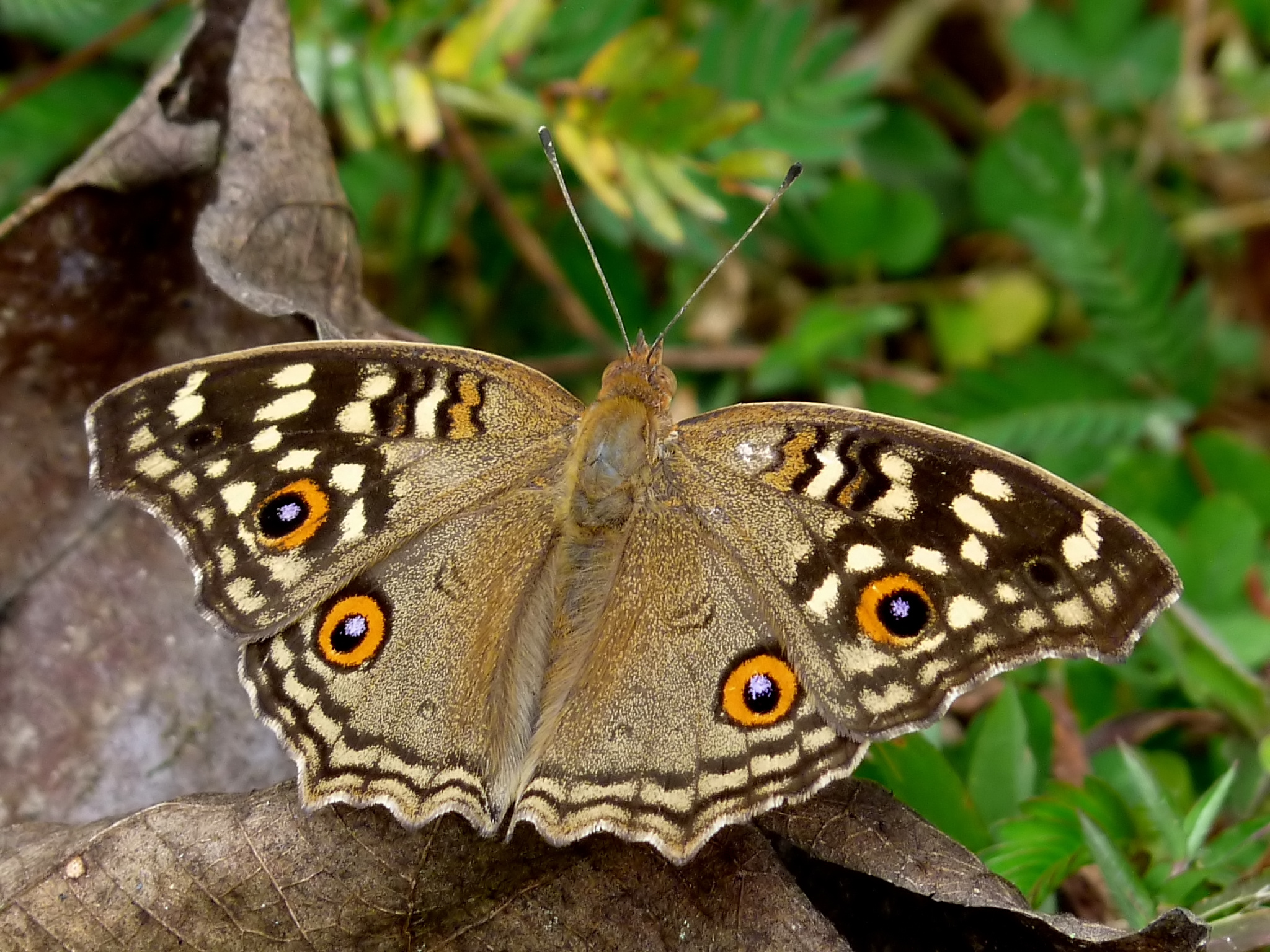
Dry-season form, upperside

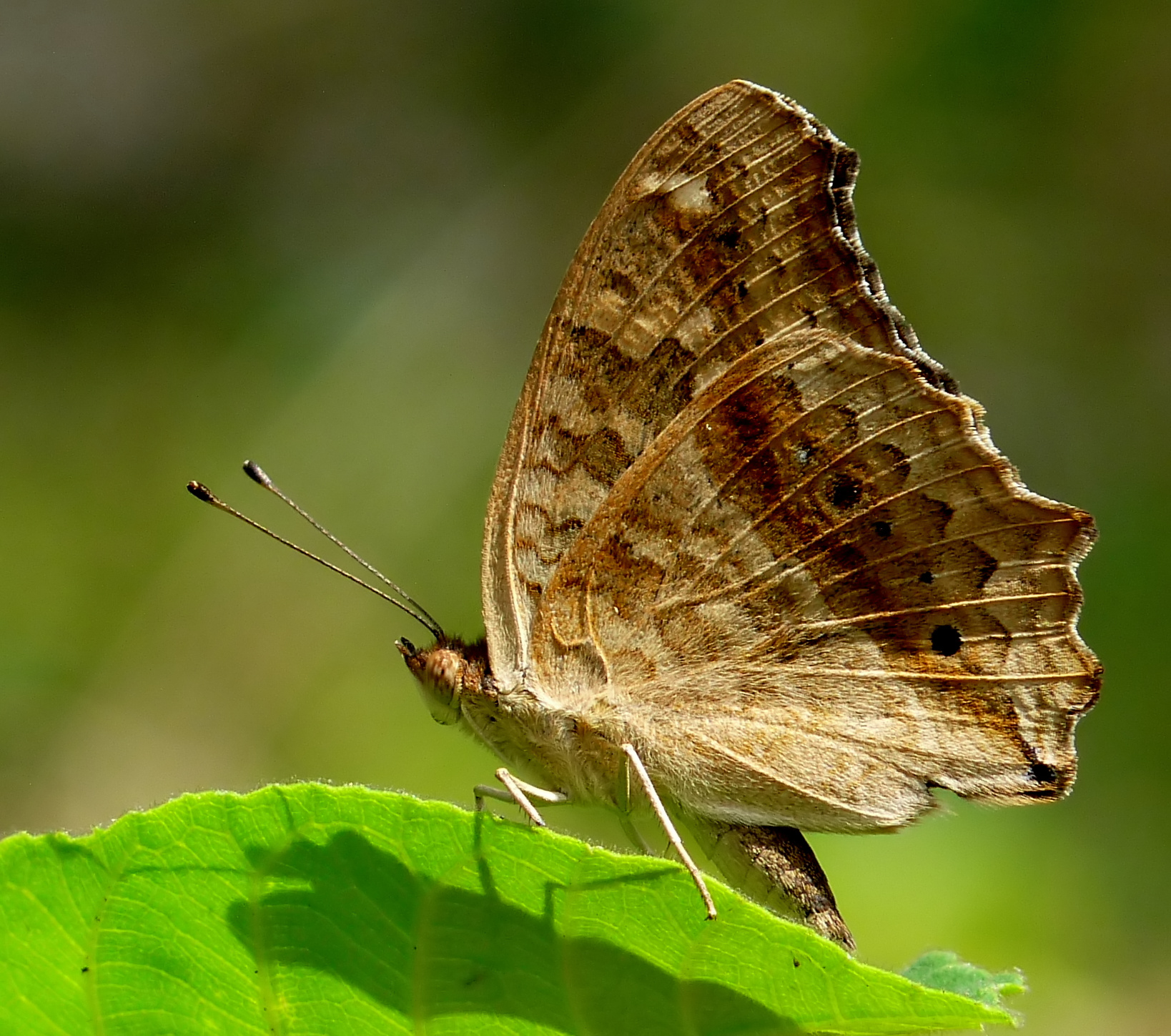
Dry-season form, underside

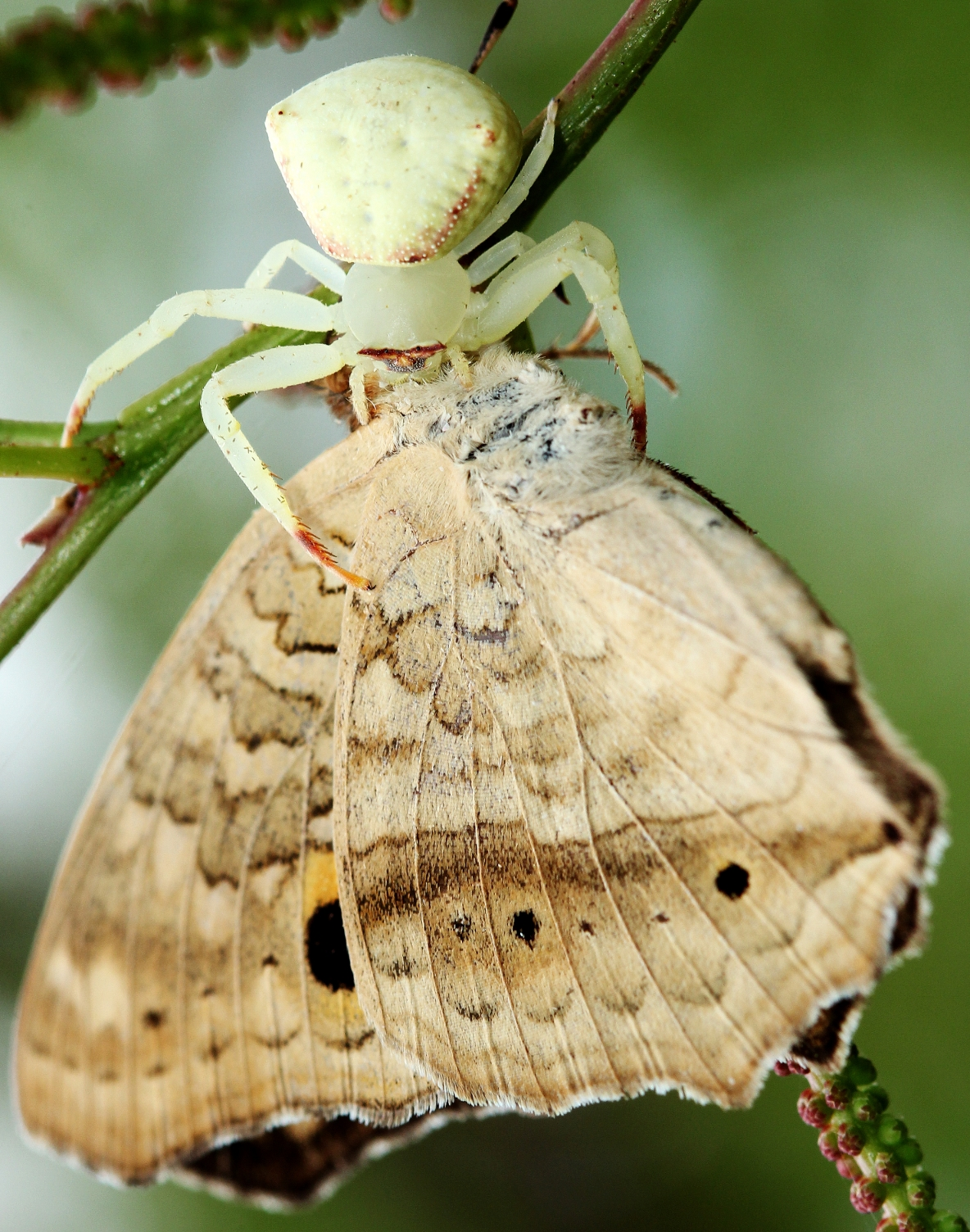
White crab spider preying on a lemon pansy

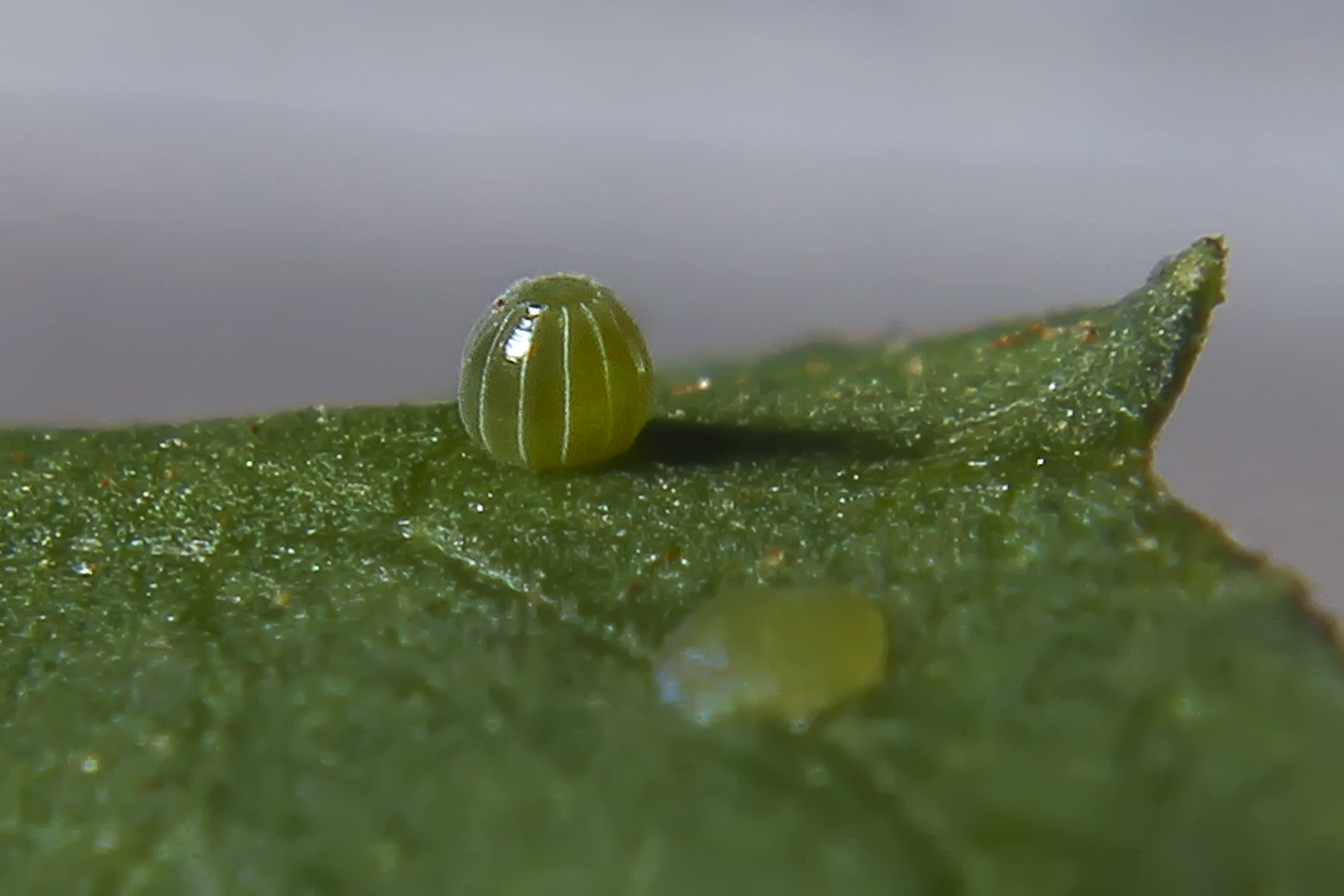
Egg

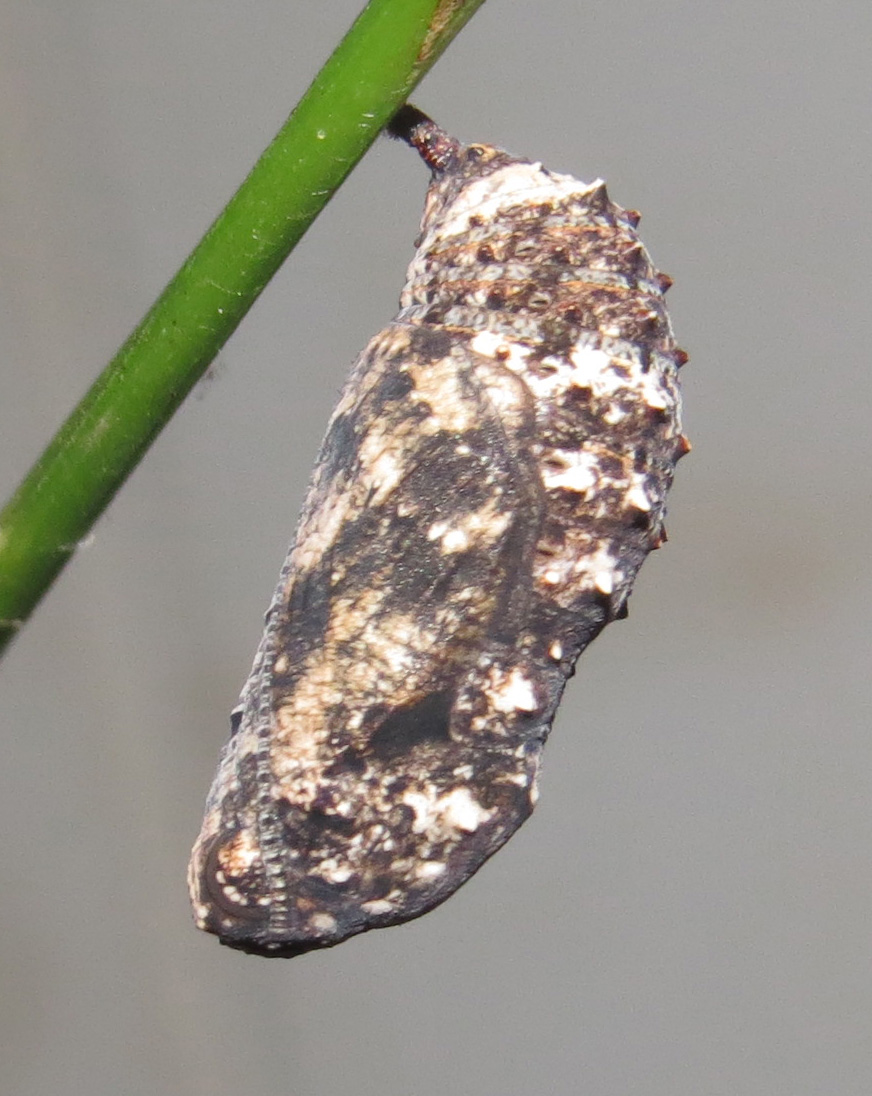
Pupa

== Life cycle ==
=== Eggs ===
Eggs are laid singly on the underside of leaves. The egg is green and barrel shaped with longitudinal ridges.

=== Caterpillar ===
The caterpillar is cylindrical, uniformly thick and covered with rows of spines which are branched at the tip. It is dull black with a faint blue sheen and has dorsal stripe of a darker color. There is a distinct orange ring behind the head. The caterpillar stays on the underside of the leaf and if disturbed, rolls up and drops to the ground.

=== Pupa ===
Pupation takes place in dense foliage close to the ground. The pupa is compact, with small conical processes on its rough surface. The pupa is well camouflaged with varying shades of brown with fine streaks and lines.

=== Food plants ===
Caterpillars feed on plants from the families Acanthaceae, Amaranthaceae, Malvaceae, Rubiaceae, Tiliaceae and Verbenaceae. Recorded species include Alternanthera sessilis, Barleria cristata, Barleria prionitis, Blechum pyramidatum, Cannabis sativa, Corchorus capsularis, Dyschoriste repens, Eranthemum pulchellum, Hemigraphis schomburgkii, Hygrophila auriculata, Hygrophila costata, Hygrophila lancea, Lepidagathis formosensis, Lepidagathis incurva, Nelsonia canescens, Ophiorrhiza japonica, Phyla nodiflora, Ruellia tuberosa, Sida rhombifolia, and Strobilanthes formosanus.

== See also ==
- List of butterflies of India
