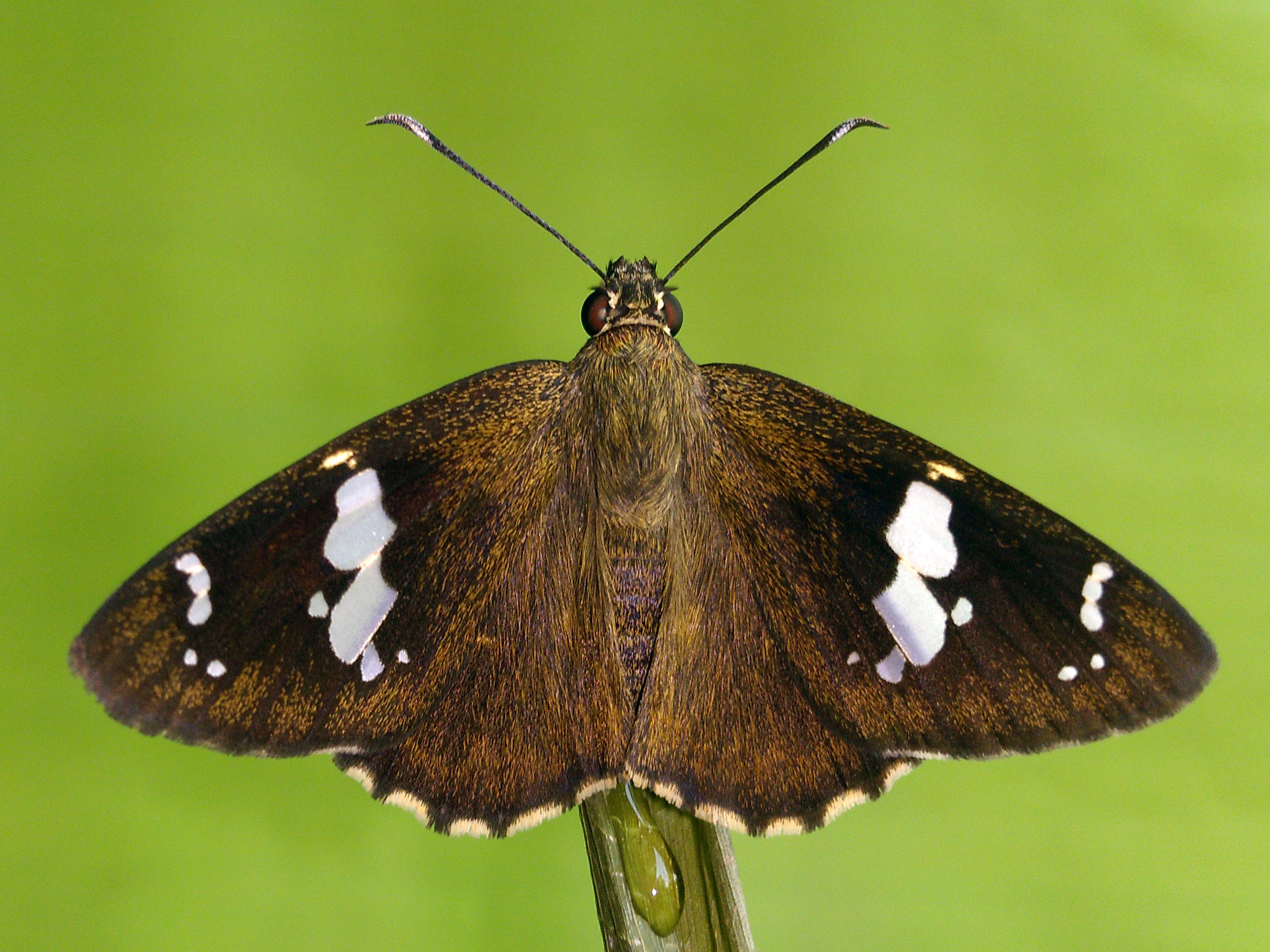

Scientific classification
- Kingdom: Animalia
- Phylum: Arthropoda
- Class: Insecta
- Order: Lepidoptera
- Family: Hesperiidae
- Genus: Celaenorrhinus
- Species: C. leucocera

Binomial name
- Celaenorrhinus leucocera (Kollar, 1848)

= Celaenorrhinus leucocera =

Common spotted flat

Species of butterfly

Celaenorrhinus leucocera, commonly known as the common spotted flat, is a species of butterfly belonging to the family Hesperiidae. It is a common butterfly generally found in the wet forested hills of southern Asia, from India and the Himalayas east through Indo-China. The upper surfaces of the wings are dark brown with white bands and small white spots towards the tip of the wings.

== Description ==
The butterfly has a wingspan of 45 to 55 mm. It is dark brown above. The forewing has a band of more or less connected discal spots, which are white and semi-transparent. Of this band, two spots, i.e. the one in end cell, and that at 2; are rectangular and connected to more or less degree. The butterfly also has small white spots in the apex of the forewing. The hindwing has a few obscure, opaque yellow spots. The hindwing margins are chequered black and white.

The male has plain white antenna shafts, while the female has plain brown shafts with white clubs.

It is a very variable species.

=== Detailed description ===
Edward Yerbury Watson (1891) gives a detailed description, shown below:

All wings dark brown; some spots and a minute dot in the middle of the forewing, a small crescent at the apex, all transparent snow-white; on the upper surface of the hindwing four spots, on the under surface a larger number irregularly placed and yellowish, the borders white, interspersed with dusky. Of median size, hindwing rounded at the outer margin, not elongated, the colour of all the wings above and below dark brown. In the middle of the forewing are three snow-white transparent almost quadrangular spots of which the hind one is the smallest, there is also a dot near the middle spot. Near the apex a crescent-shaped spot. On the hindwing several small yellow spots irregularly arranged; four on the upperside more or less obsolete, and seven on the underside almost punctiform, the outer five in acurved row near the outer margin. The fringe of the forewing brown with several whitish spots, on the hindwing alternately yellowish-white and brown. Head and body brown and hairy, the palpi yellowish- white clothed with brown hairs above; two yellow spots at the nape. Club of the antennae snow-white, below brown.

— E. Y. Watson

== Distribution and habitat ==
This butterfly is found in Myanmar, Thailand, western China, Malaysia and the Indonesian archipelago (Borneo, Sumatra, Java and Bali).

It occurs in India wherever its preferred forest habitat - moist, deciduous, semi-evergreen and secondary evergreen forests with a basically natural, varied herb and shrub vegetation - is present. It ranges from South India through Maharashtra to Bengal, and along the Himalayas from Kashmir to Assam and Arunachal Pradesh (Mishmi Hills); and also the Andaman Islands. It flies from plains level to 8,000 feet (2,400 m) in the Himalayas.

The type locality of this species is the Himalayas.

== Ecology and life cycle ==
The common spotted flat flies in the wet jungles of the peninsula and the Himalayas. It is a shade-loving insect, rarely venturing out of the forest, except early in the morning, late in the evening or when it is overcast.

It visits flowers and rests on the undersides of leaves. Its long proboscis permits it to feed from flowers having long tubular corollas. It visits Impatiens, Asystasia, Blepharis, Peristrophe, Crossandra and other Acanthaceae shrubs and herbs which are abundant in the dappled environs of the forest edge where this butterfly is most likely to be found. The butterfly can also be spotted mud-puddling occasionally.

When active, the common spotted flat alternates between sun and shade, flying in the open patches for a while and resting a while when in the shade. As it is a wary butterfly which rarely settles on the top of bushes, resting instead mostly on the undersides of leaves, it is difficult to get a good look at the common spotted flat in the field. Its fast, zig-zagging flight also makes it difficult to track while in the air. It flies fast and low, usually below 6 feet, and aggressively defends its territory from other butterflies. When disturbed, it buzzes in circles around before settling down, near to where it was perched before.

This species, like others of its group, is distinguished by its habit of keeping its wings spread flat; the behaviour which gives these butterflies their name.

=== Eggs ===
The egg of the common spotted flat are green, dome-shaped, glossy and have many small longitudinal ridges with smooth surfaces in between. The egg is laid on the young leaves of plants in shady places, both above and below the leaf surface. The eggshell forms the first meal of the newly hatched caterpillar.

=== Caterpillars ===
After eating the eggshell, the first instar caterpillar constructs a cell from a triangular piece of leaf which it folds over the upper surface of the leaf. It lines the inside with silk. Here, the caterpillar resides till it outgrows the cell, whereupon it proceeds to construct a larger one, purse shaped using two leaves where it rests with head turned on the side. If disturbed, the caterpillar raises its front over the back with legs outstretched and jaws open.

The caterpillar is dark olive green with a dorsal wavy line of deeper tinge. It has a paler coloured band running along the spiracles throughout the length of the body. The legs and underside of the caterpillar are pale green. The skin is dull, transparent and is covered with minute whitish hairs. Its heart-shaped head is glossy, dark with a rufous tinge, and having a flat base below.

=== Pupa ===
The caterpillar pupates in a cell, sometimes on fresh leaves, at other times on dead leaves or even in the leaf litter. The pale reddish-golden pupa is cylindrical, widest at the thorax, tapering quickly towards the head and gently towards the rear. The head has a small rounded protuberance. The pupa is firmly fixed to the silk pad.

=== Host plants ===
The food plants are mostly common Acanthaceae shrubs from semi-evergreen, deciduous and secondary evergreen forests. The caterpillars have been recorded on Asystasia gangetica, Ecbolium linguistrinum, Eranthemum roseum, Nilgirianthus heyneanus, Nilgirianthus barbatus, Carvia callosa and Thelepaepale ixiocephala.

== Status ==
It is common. It is the commonest of all Celaenorrhinus species occurring in India.

The best period to see the common spotted flat is during the rainy season and months immediately after. The population decreases as winter and summer progresses and rises once again at the next monsoon.

== Gallery ==
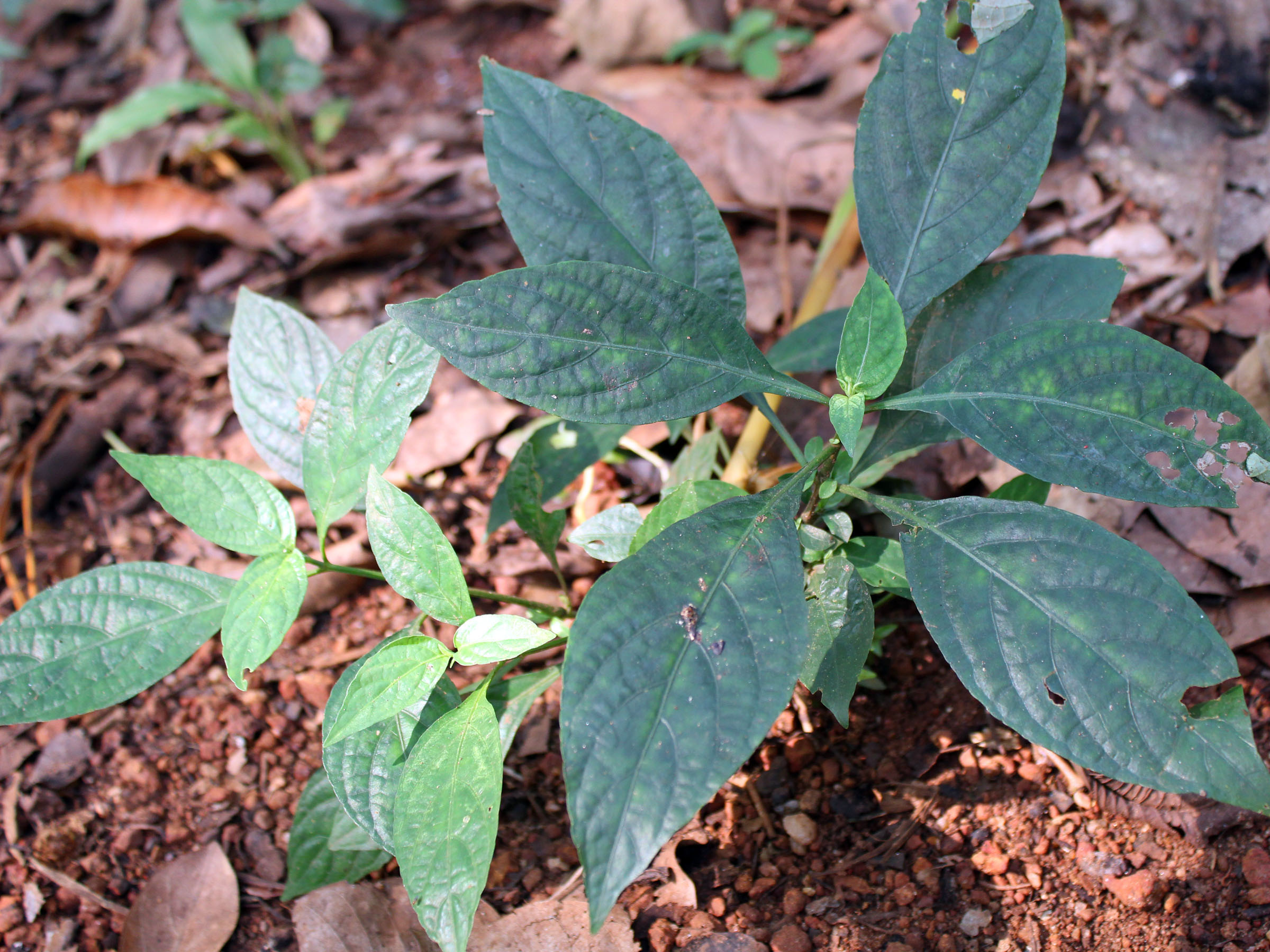
Host plant: Eranthemum roseum

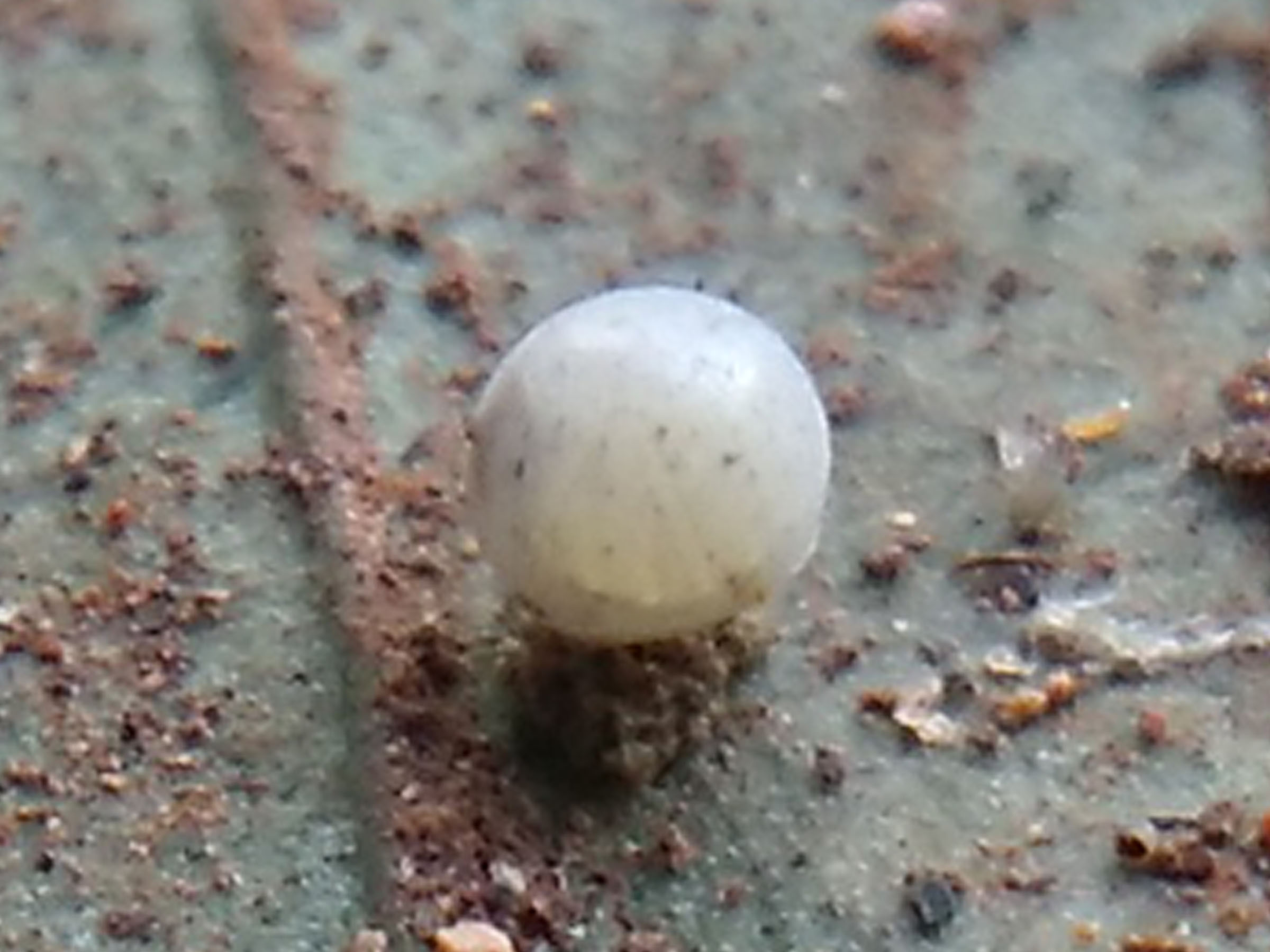
Egg

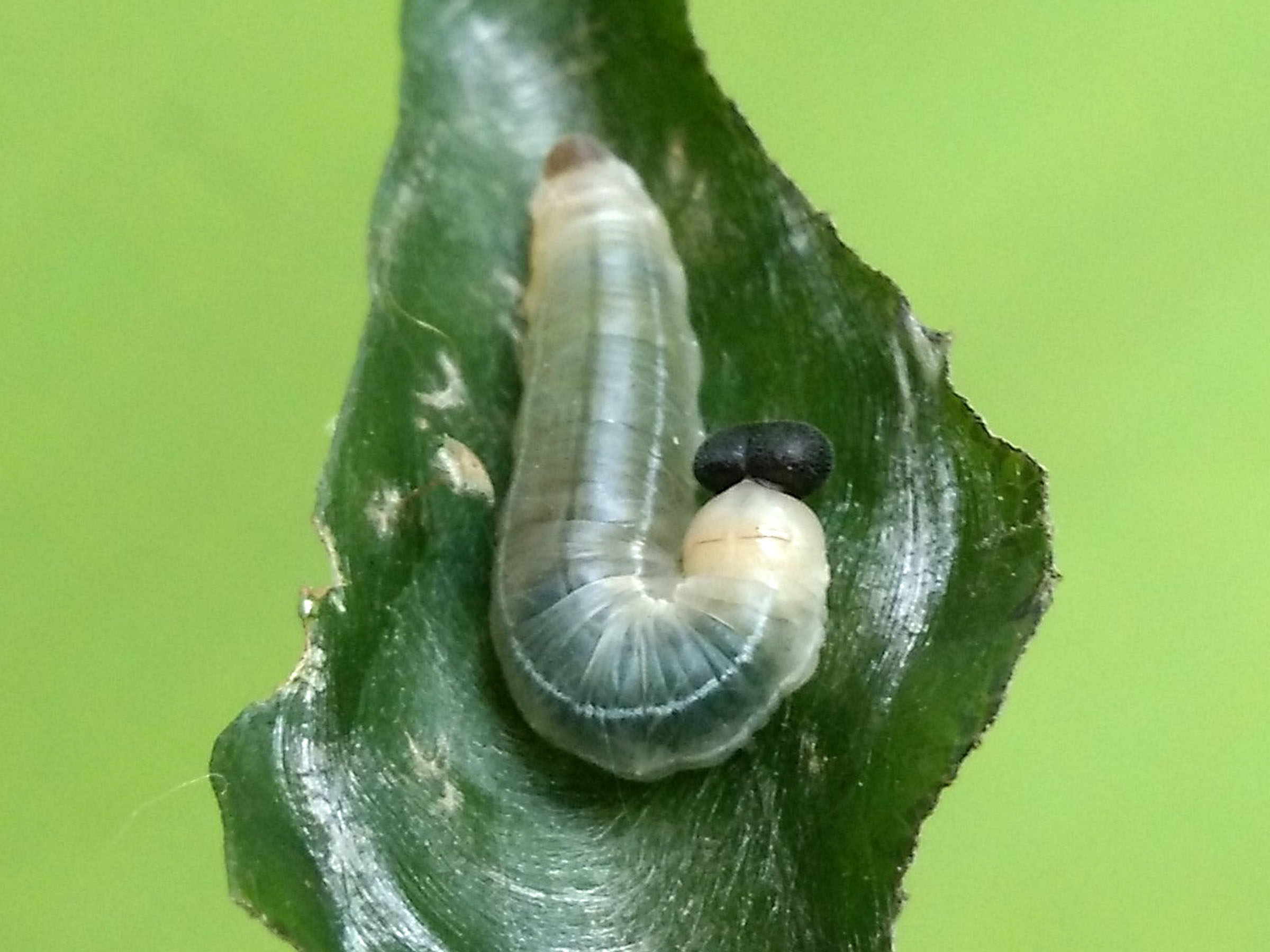
Larva

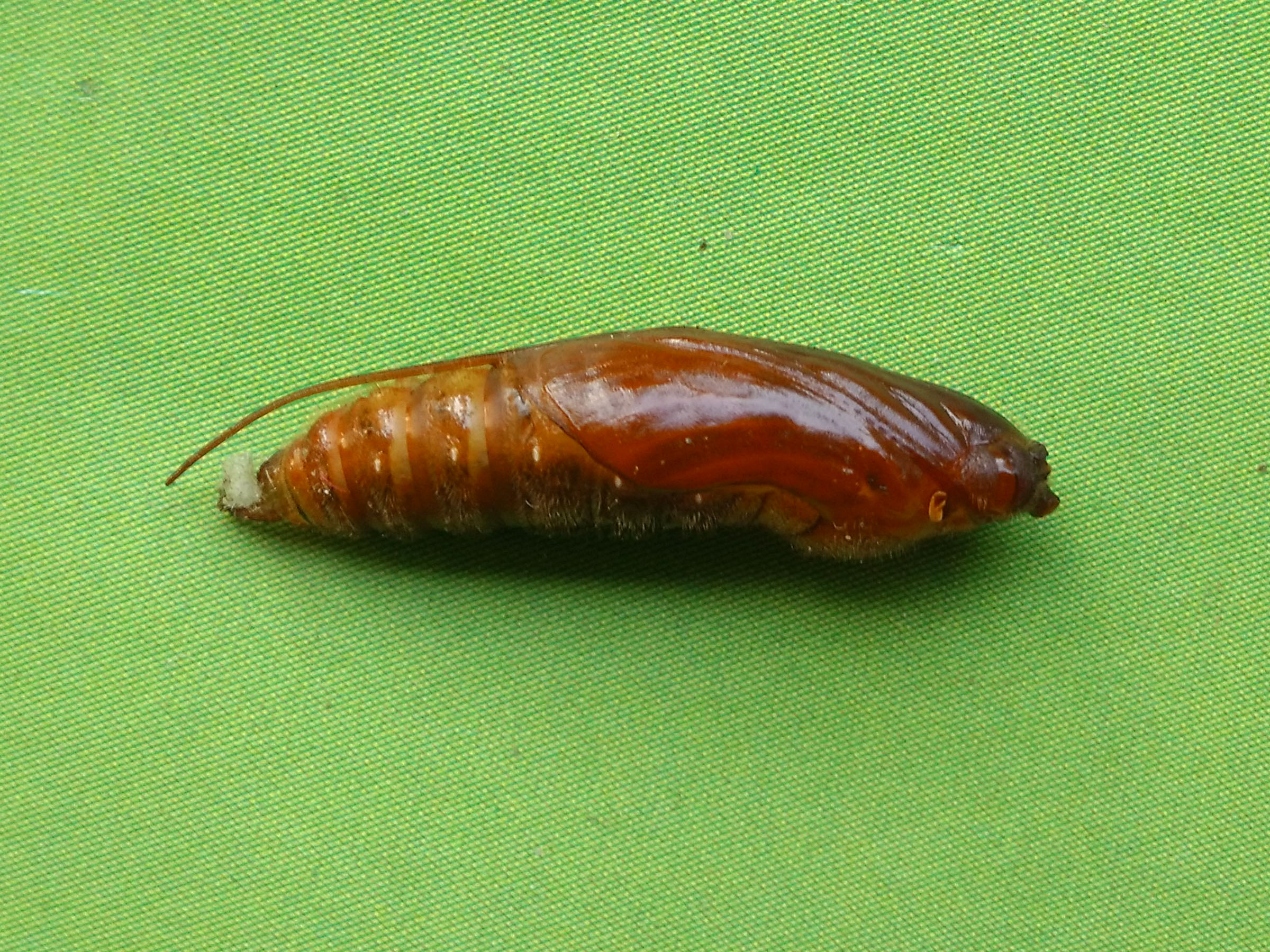
Pupa

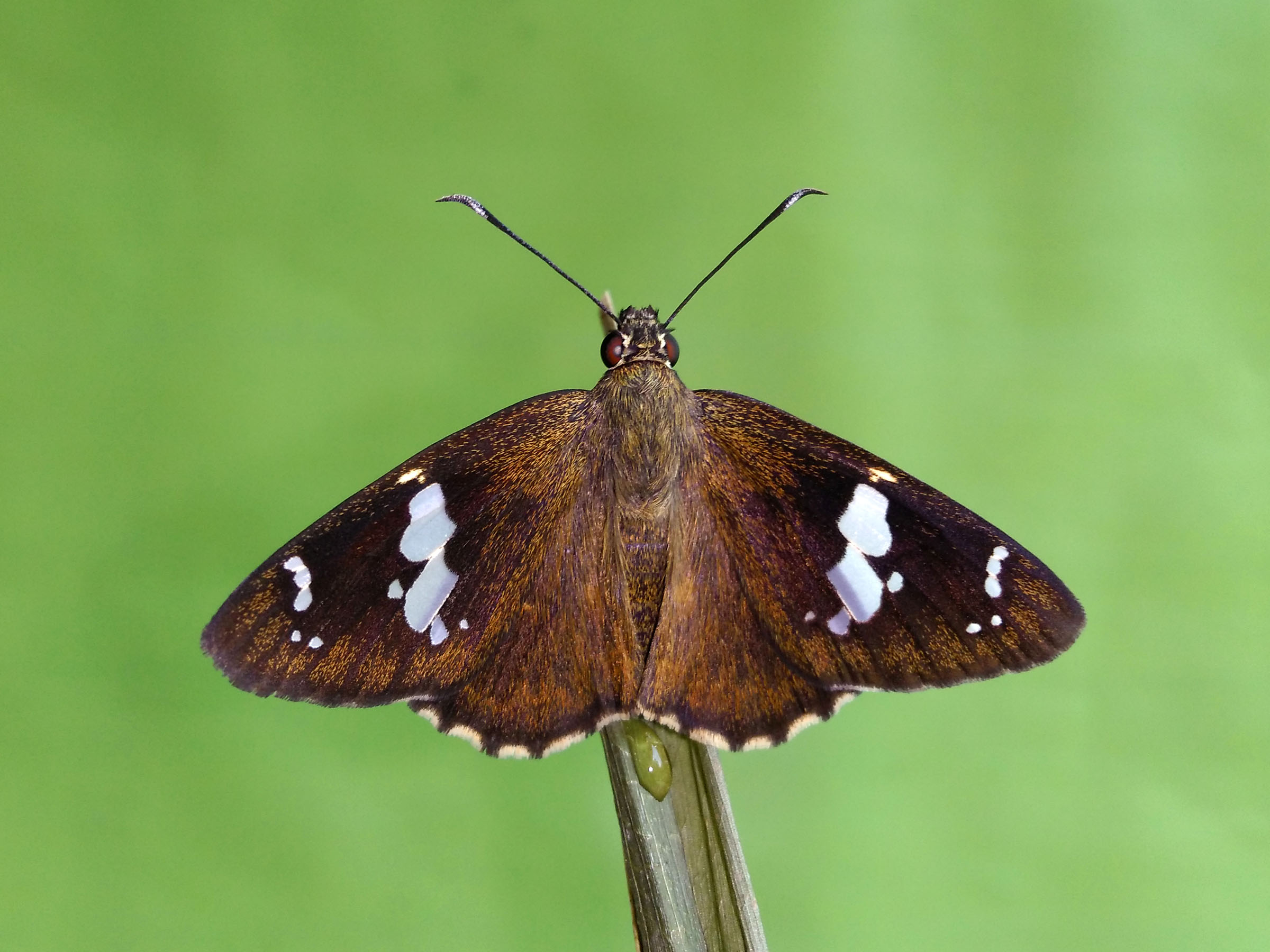
Imago (dorsal view)

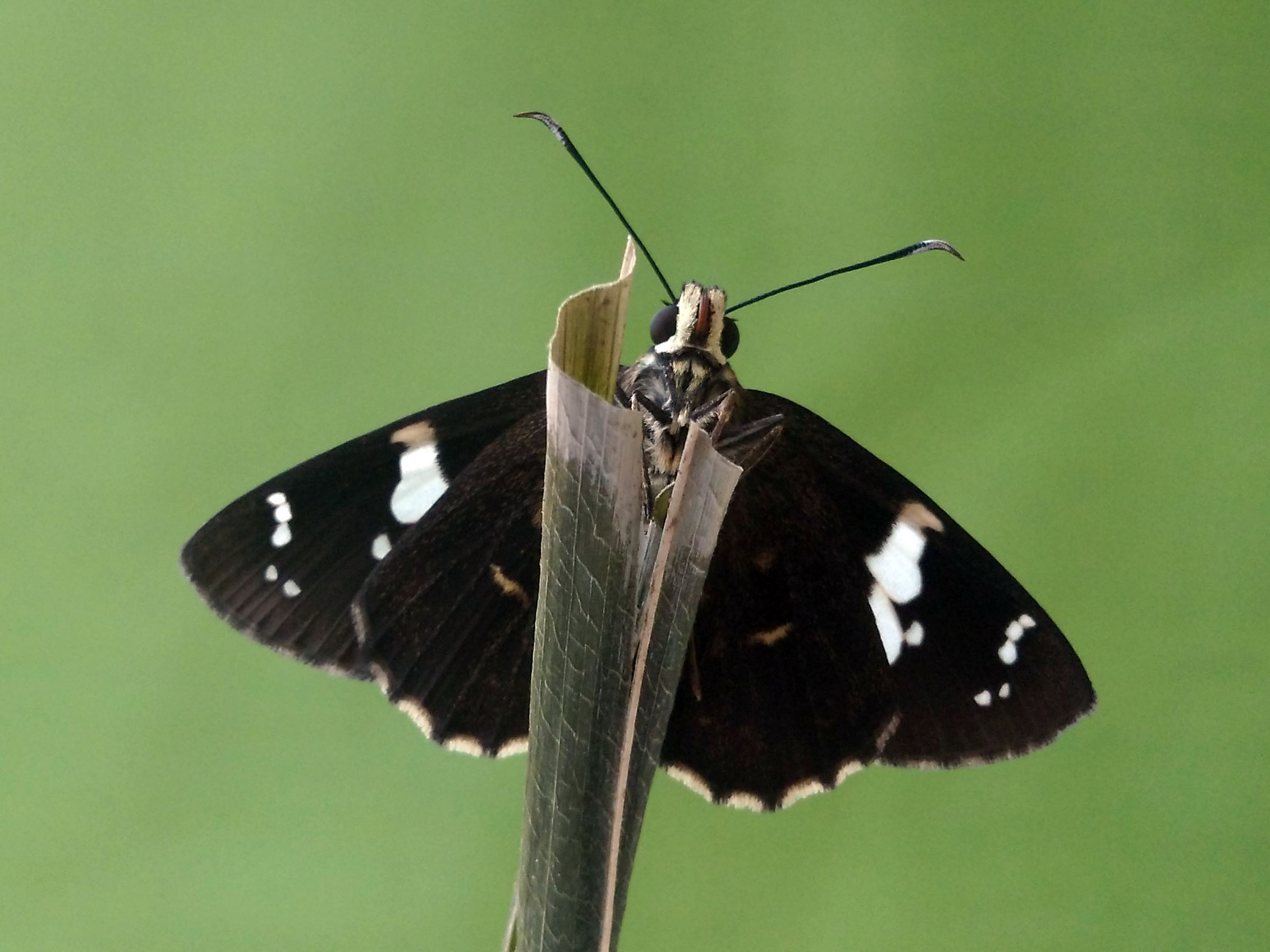
Imago (ventral view)

== See also ==
- Hesperiidae
- List of butterflies of India (Hesperiidae)
