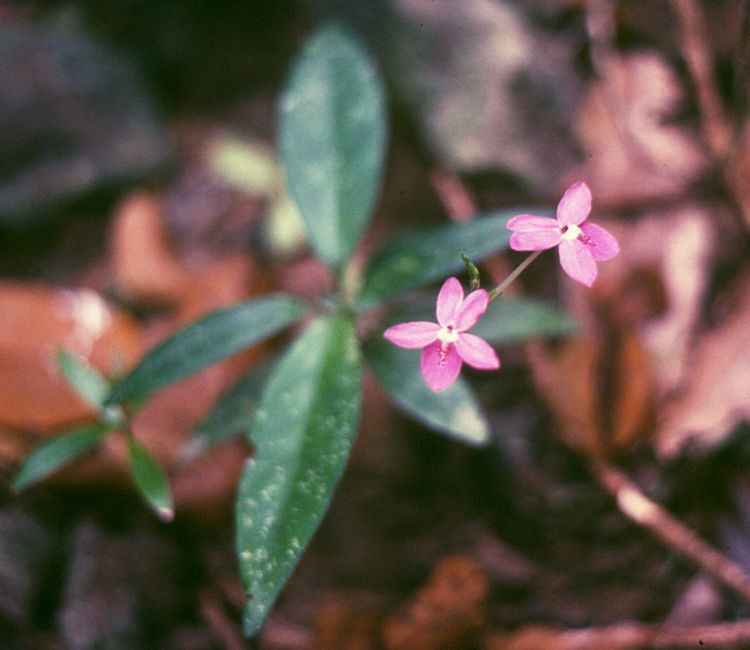
- Pseuderanthemum crenulatum from Kaoh Ruessei Island SSE, Sihanoukville

Scientific classification
- Kingdom: Plantae
- Clade: Tracheophytes
- Clade: Angiosperms
- Clade: Eudicots
- Clade: Asterids
- Order: Lamiales
- Family: Acanthaceae
- Genus: Pseuderanthemum
- Species: P. crenulatum

Binomial name
- Pseuderanthemum crenulatum (Lindl.) Radlk., 1884

Synonyms
- Eranthemum crenulatum Lindl. (disputed basionym); Pseuderanthemum graciliflorum (Nees) Ridl. Pseuderanthemum malaccense (C.B. Clarke) Lindau; Siphoneranthemum crenulatum Kuntze (unresolved)

= Pseuderanthemum crenulatum =

Species of flowering plant

Pseuderanthemum crenulatum is a herbaceous plant species, belonging to the Acanthaceae, which occurs in Indo-China and Malaysia; no subspecies are listed in the Catalogue of Life.

== Gallery ==
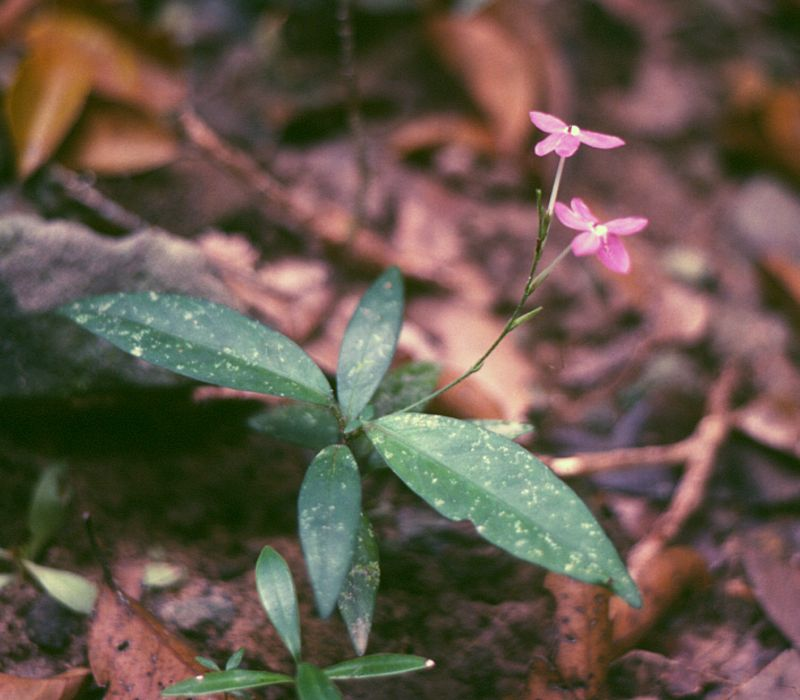
