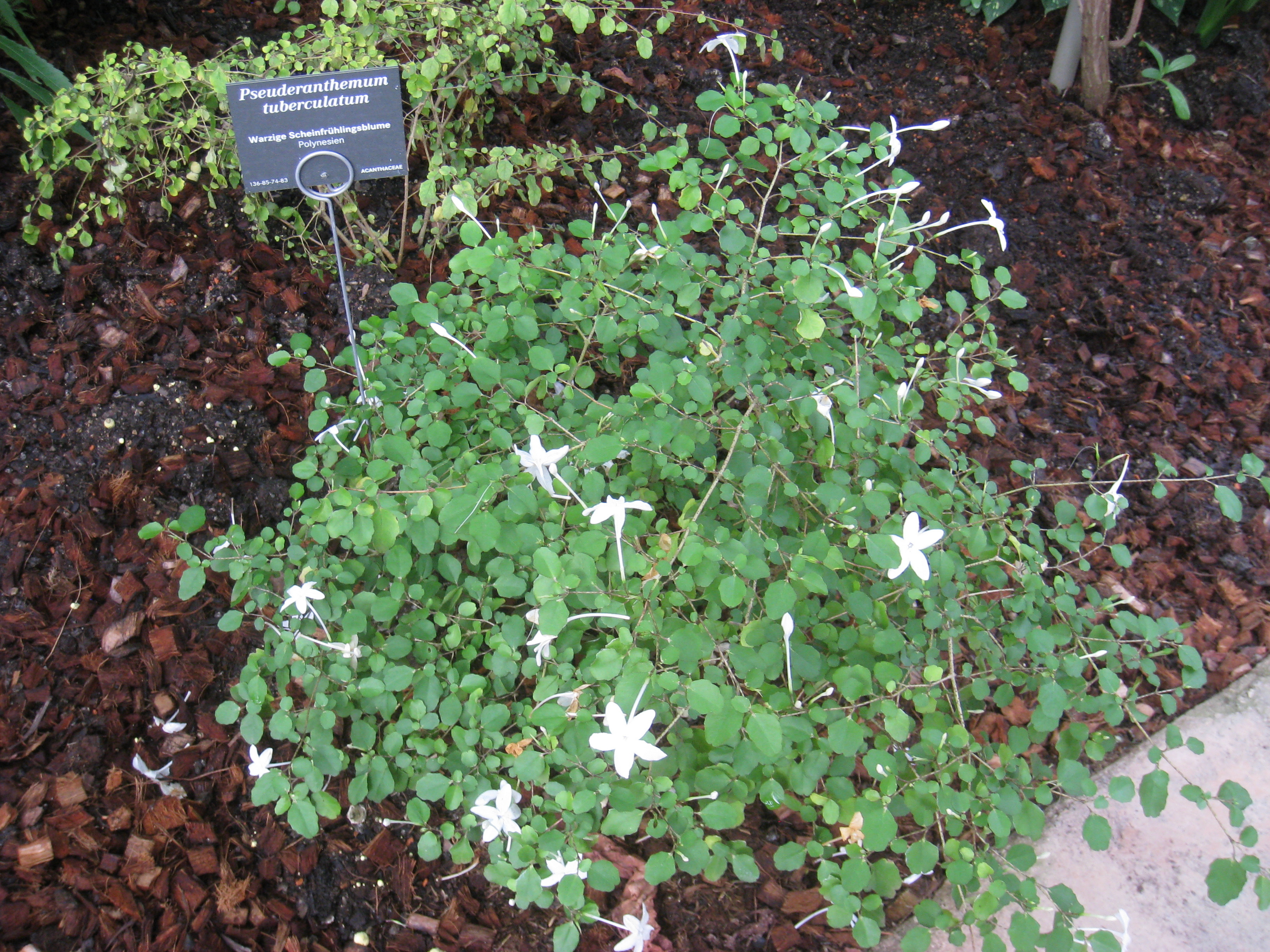

Scientific classification
- Kingdom: Plantae
- Clade: Tracheophytes
- Clade: Angiosperms
- Clade: Eudicots
- Clade: Asterids
- Order: Lamiales
- Family: Acanthaceae
- Genus: Pseuderanthemum
- Species: P. tuberculatum

Binomial name
- Pseuderanthemum tuberculatum (Hook.f.) Radlk.

= Pseuderanthemum tuberculatum =

Species of flowering plant

Pseuderanthemum tuberculatum is a species of plant in the family Acanthaceae, native to Polynesia.
