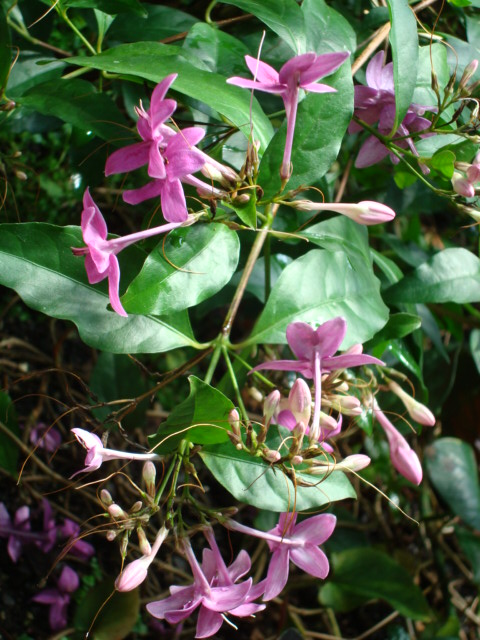
- Pseuderanthemum laxiflorum Purple Dazzler

Scientific classification
- Kingdom: Plantae
- Clade: Tracheophytes
- Clade: Angiosperms
- Clade: Eudicots
- Clade: Asterids
- Order: Lamiales
- Family: Acanthaceae
- Genus: Pseuderanthemum
- Species: P. laxiflorum

Binomial name
- Pseuderanthemum laxiflorum (A.Gray) F.T.Hubb. ex L.H.Bailey

Synonyms
- Eranthemum laxiflorum A.Gray

= Pseuderanthemum laxiflorum =

Species of flowering plant

Pseuderanthemum laxiflorum is a species of plant in the family Acanthaceae. It is a shrub or tree endemic to Fiji.
