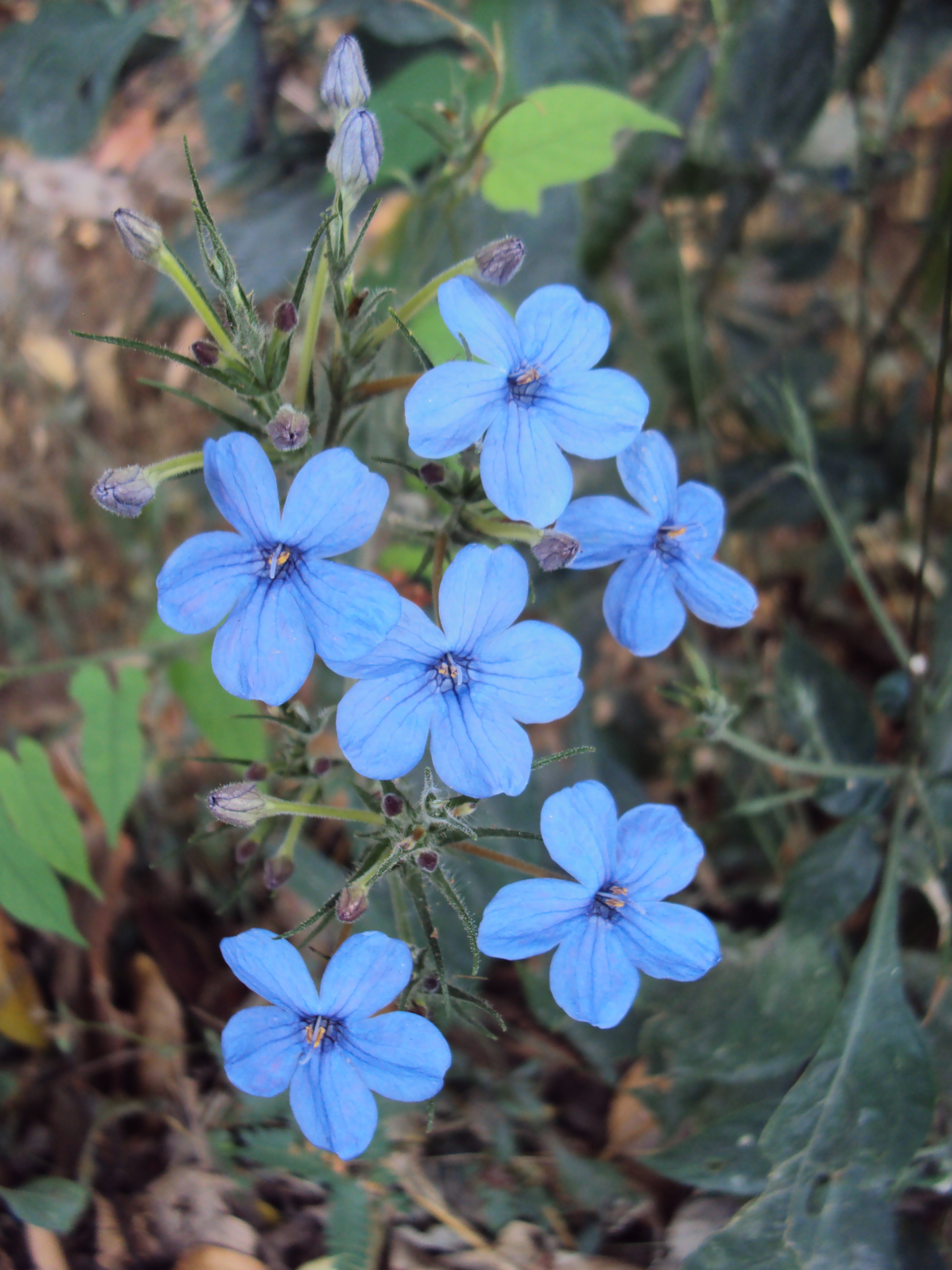

Scientific classification
- Kingdom: Plantae
- Clade: Embryophytes
- Clade: Tracheophytes
- Clade: Angiosperms
- Clade: Eudicots
- Clade: Asterids
- Order: Lamiales
- Family: Acanthaceae
- Genus: Eranthemum
- Species: E. capense

Binomial name
- Eranthemum capense L.

Synonyms
- List: Daedalacanthus capensis (L.) Druce; Daedalacanthus fastigiatus (Lam.) Alston; Daedalacanthus montanus (Roxb.) T.Anderson; Eranthemum capense var. wightianum (Wall. ex Nees) Karthik. & Moorthy; Eranthemum fastigiatum (Lam.) R.Br. ex Roem. & Schult.; Eranthemum montanum (Roxb.) Roxb.; Eranthemum wightianum Wall. ex Nees; Justicia divaricata Wall.; Justicia fastigiata Lam.; Justicia montana Roxb.; Justicia pulchella Wight ex Wall.; Ruellia varians B.Heyne ex Wall.

= Eranthemum capense =

Species of perennial shrub

Eranthemum capense or Konkan Eranthemum is a perennial shrub belonging to the family Acanthaceae.

== Habit and Habitat ==
They grow in seasonally dry tropical biome. They are seen growing in the semi-evergreen and moist deciduous forests and sacred groves of Western Ghats & Eastern Ghats.

== Description ==
It is a subshrub growing up to 1.5 m (4 ft 11 in). Elliptical, pointed leaves are dark green. Infloreascence is apical or axillary panicles or spikes. Capsules are oblong, four compressed, gyroscopically hairy seeds.

== Gallery ==
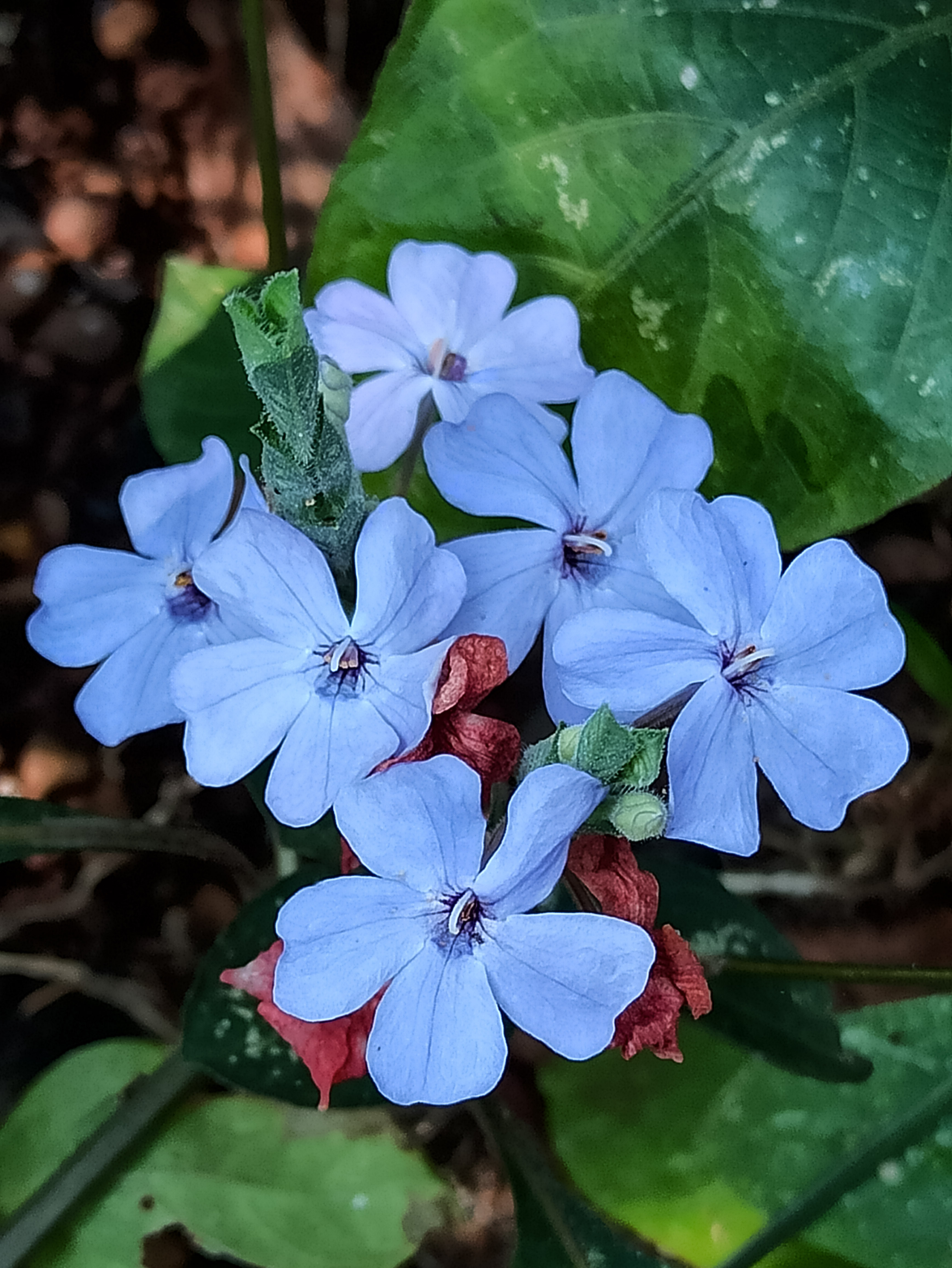

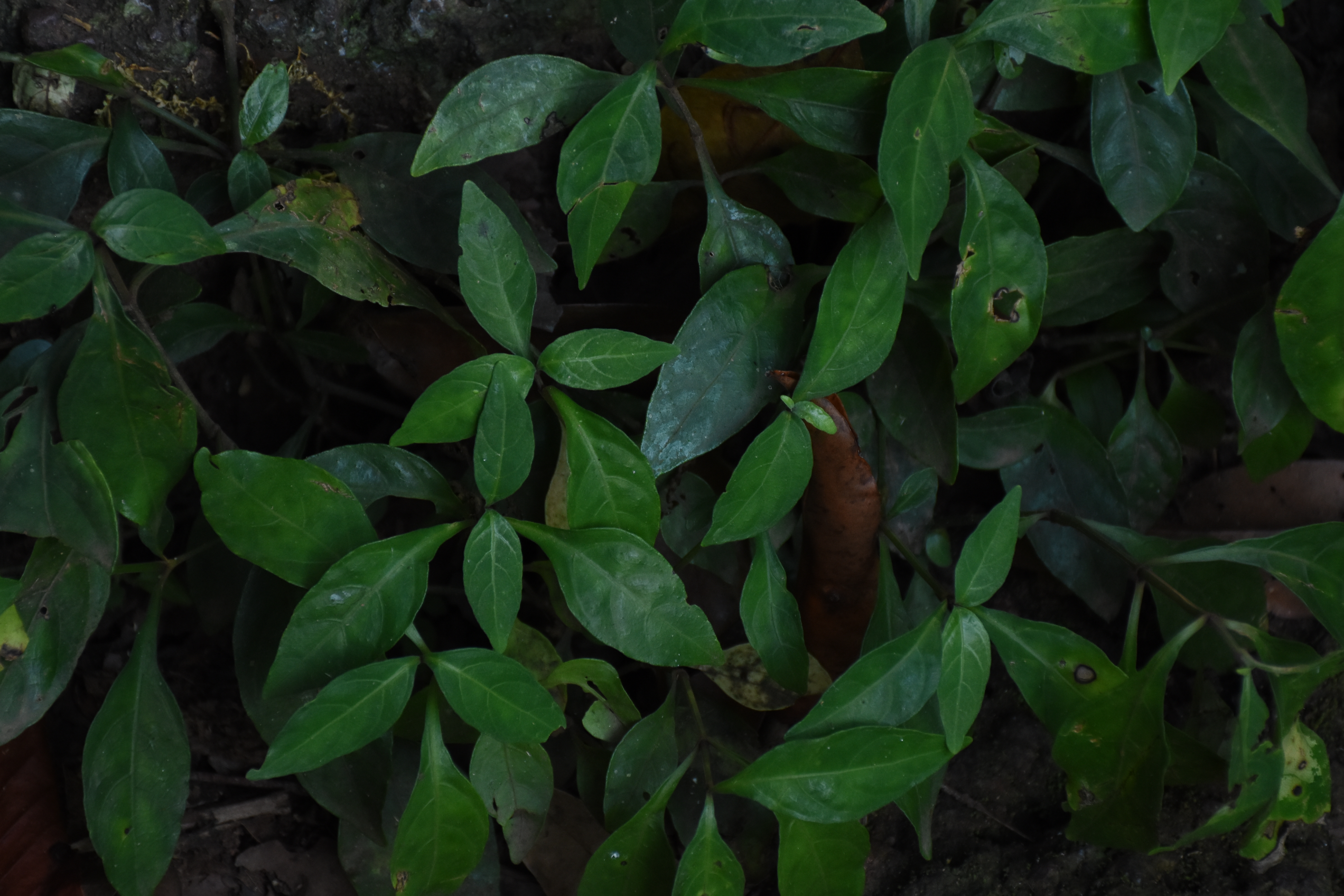

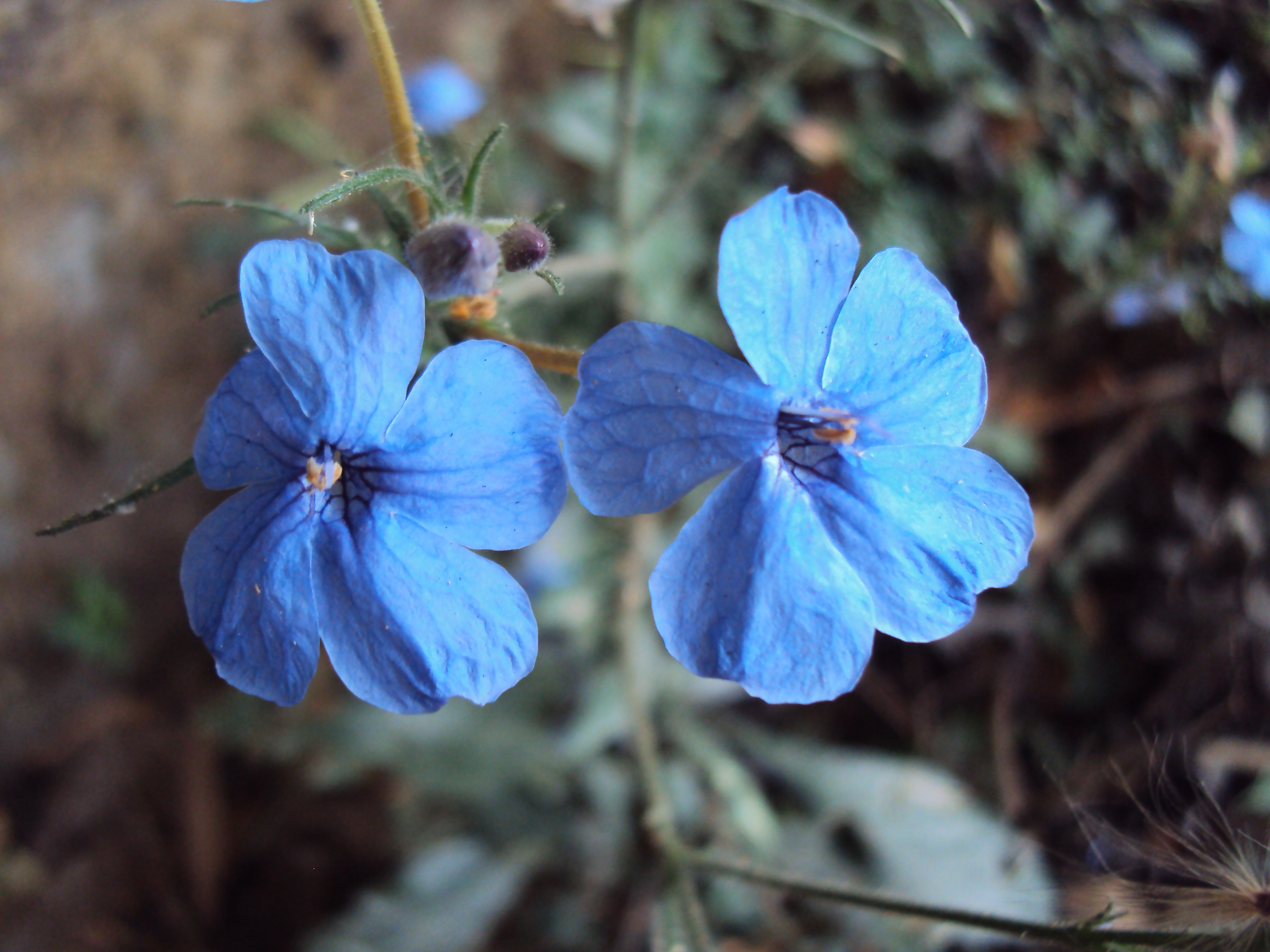

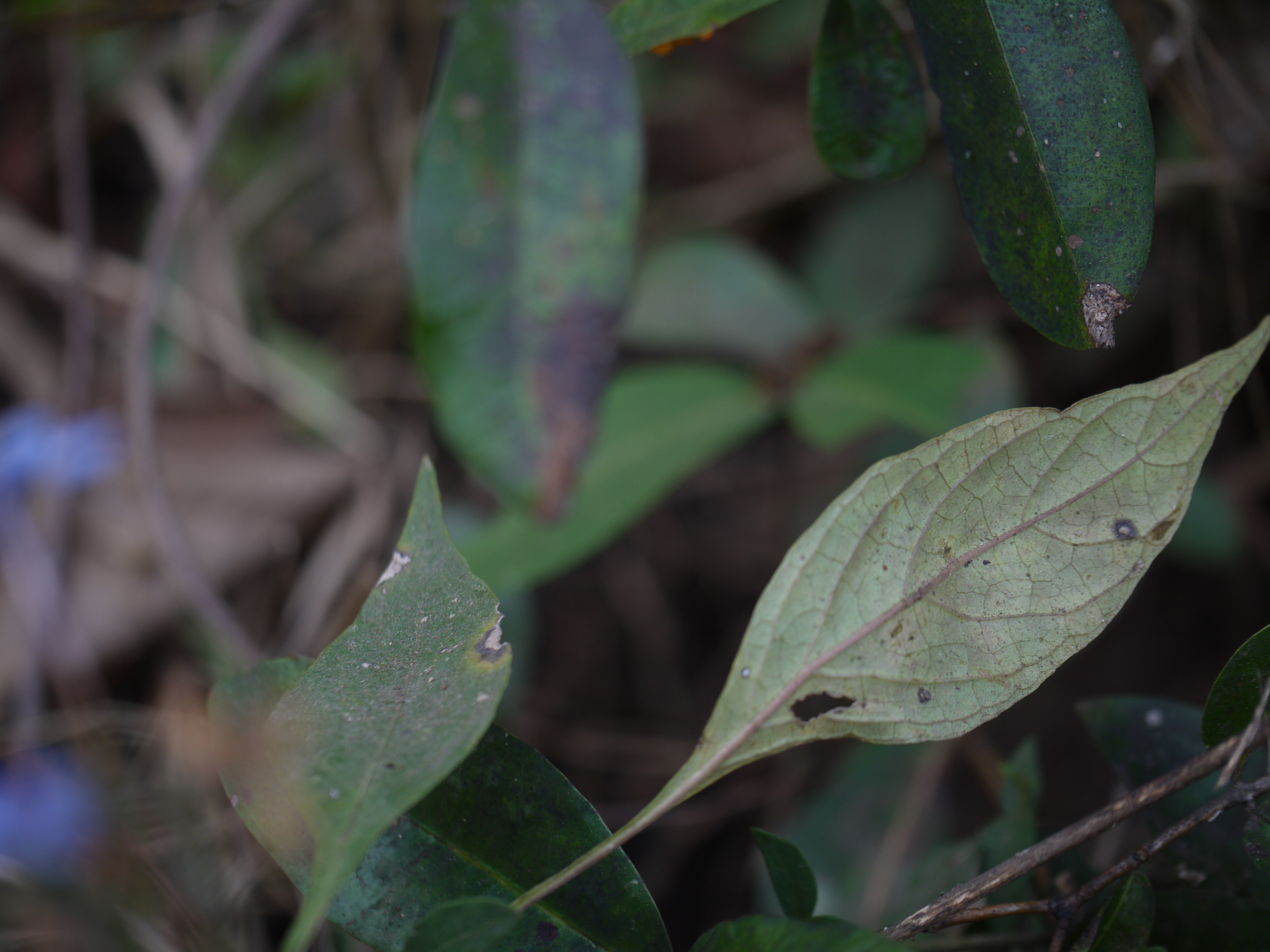
