= Pseuderanthemum maculatum =

Scientific classification
- Kingdom: Plantae
- Clade: Embryophytes
- Clade: Tracheophytes
- Clade: Angiosperms
- Clade: Eudicots
- Clade: Asterids
- Order: Lamiales
- Family: Acanthaceae
- Genus: Pseuderanthemum
- Species: P. maculatum

Binomial name
- Pseuderanthemum maculatum (G.Lodd.) I.M.Turner

Synonyms
- List: Eranthemum atropurpureum Hook.f.; Eranthemum atropurpureum W.Bull; Eranthemum carruthersii Seem.; Eranthemum moorei W.Bull; Eranthemum nigrescens W.Bull; Eranthemum nigrum Linden; Eranthemum reticulatum A.de Vos; Eranthemum reticulatum W.Bull; Eranthemum tricolor Leblebici; Eranthemum versicolor W.Bull; Eranthemum whartonianum Hemsl.; Graptophyllum caudifolium C.B.Clarke ex Bedd.; Justicia maculata G.Lodd.; Pseuderanthemum atropurpureum (W.Bull) Radlk.; Pseuderanthemum carruthersii (Seem.) Guillaumin; Pseuderanthemum carruthersii var. reticulatum (W.Bull) Fosberg; Pseuderanthemum eldorado (B.S.Williams) Radlk.; Pseuderanthemum jaluitense Lindau; Pseuderanthemum kewense L.H.Bailey; Pseuderanthemum majus (Baill.) Guillaumin; Pseuderanthemum moorei (W.Bull) Radlk.; Pseuderanthemum reticulatum (W.Bull) Radlk.; Pseuderanthemum tricolor Radlk.; Pseuderanthemum versicolor (W.Bull) Radlk.; Siphoneranthemum atropurpureum (W.Bull) Kuntze; Siphoneranthemum eldorado (B.S.Williams) Kuntze; Siphoneranthemum moorei (W.Bull) Kuntze; Siphoneranthemum reticulatum (W.Bull) Kuntze; Siphoneranthemum tricolor (W.Bull) Kuntze; Siphoneranthemum versicolor (W.Bull) Kuntze

Species of flowering plant

Pseuderanthemum maculatum, commonly known as yellow-vein eranthemum or golden pseuderanthemum, is a species of evergreen shrub in the family Acanthaceae. It is native to the Solomon Islands and Vanuatu, and has been introduced to other islands of Oceania and to some parts of Southeast Asia, Africa, Central America and South America.

== Description ==
This species has waxy, broad, pointed, somewhat irregular, variegated leaves in a combination of different shades of green suffused with purple and silver. The small, white flowers have purple-pink spots that are concentrated at the base of the petals.

== Gallery ==
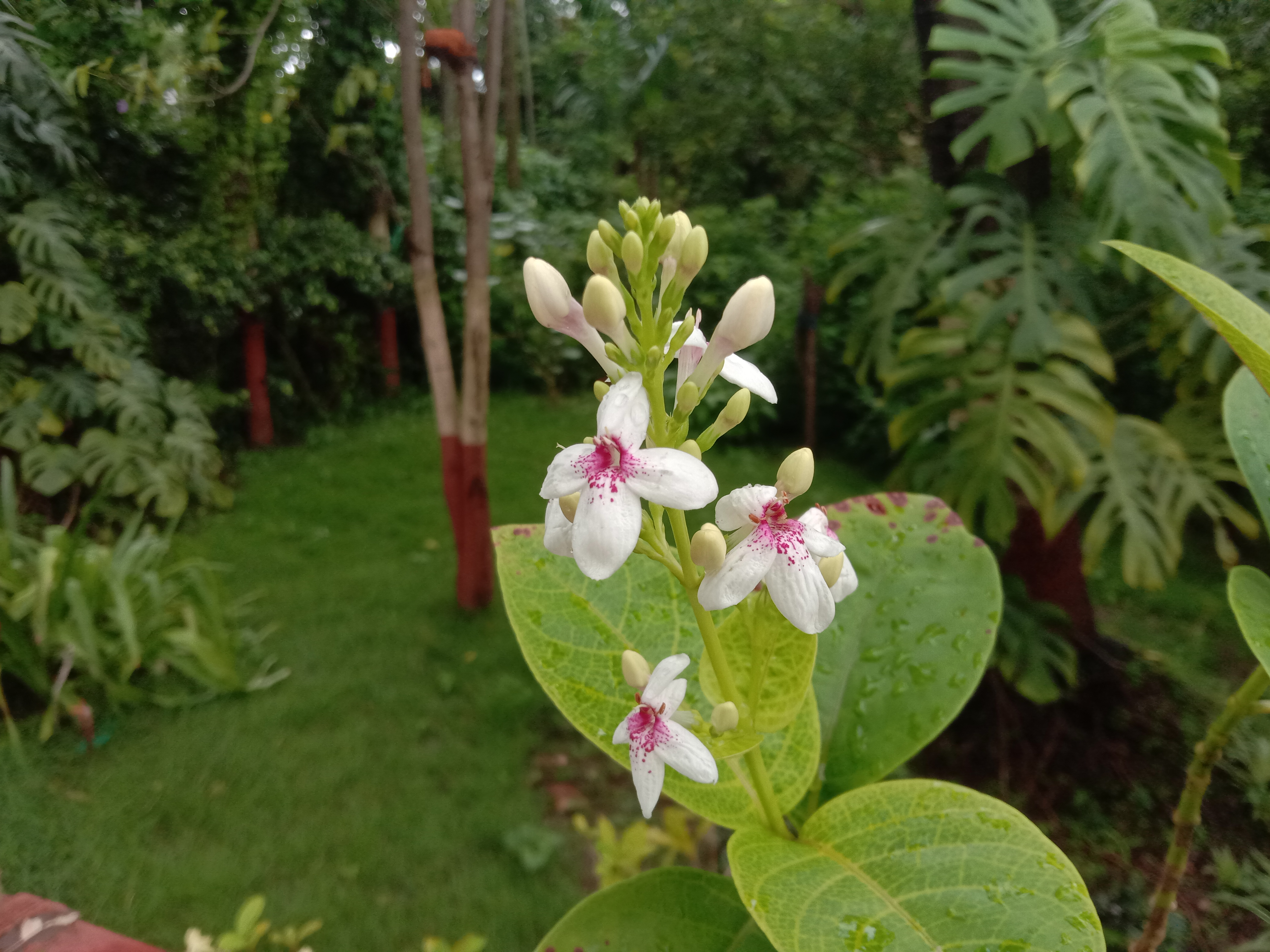
Buds and flowers in West Bengal, India

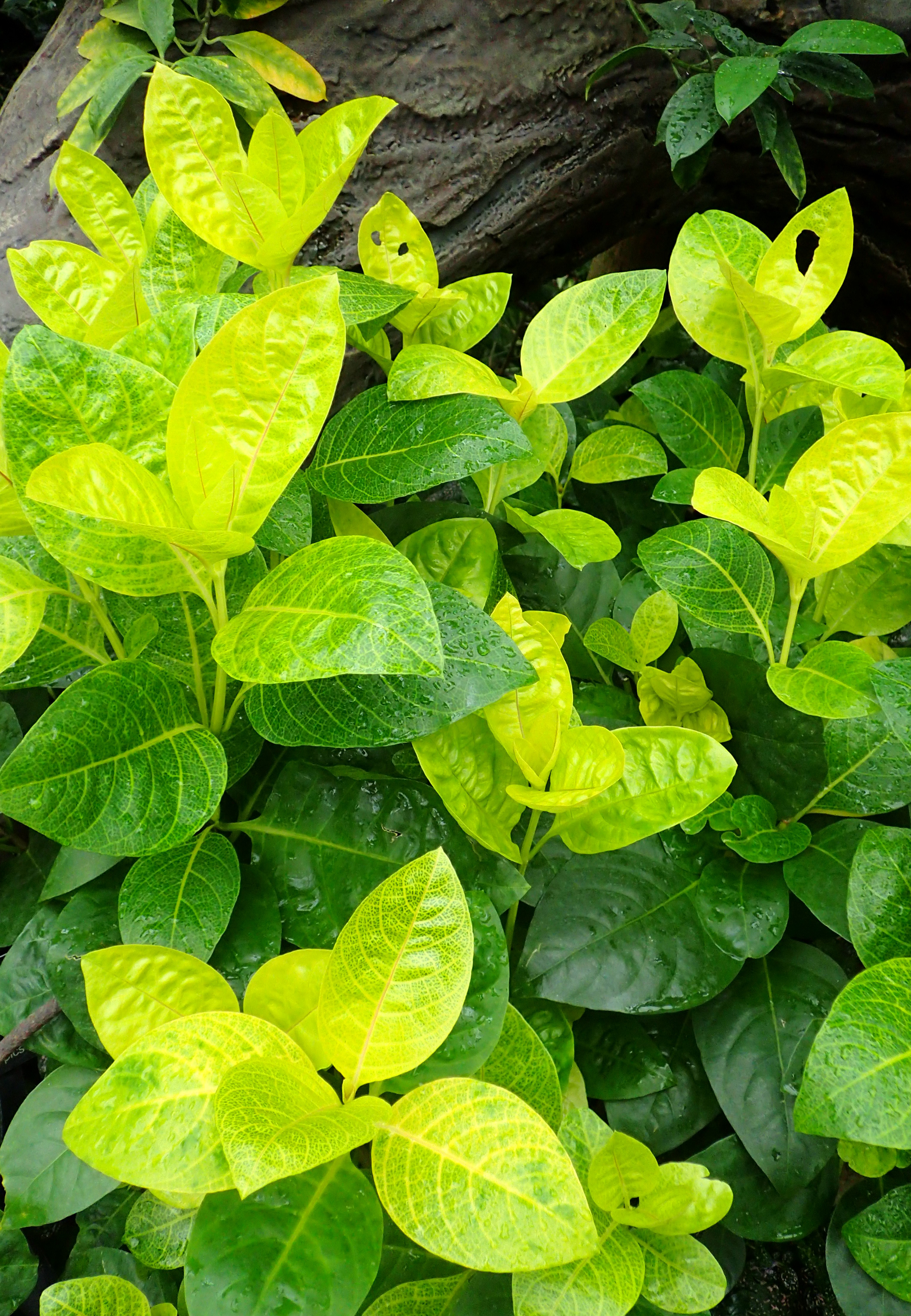
Foliage

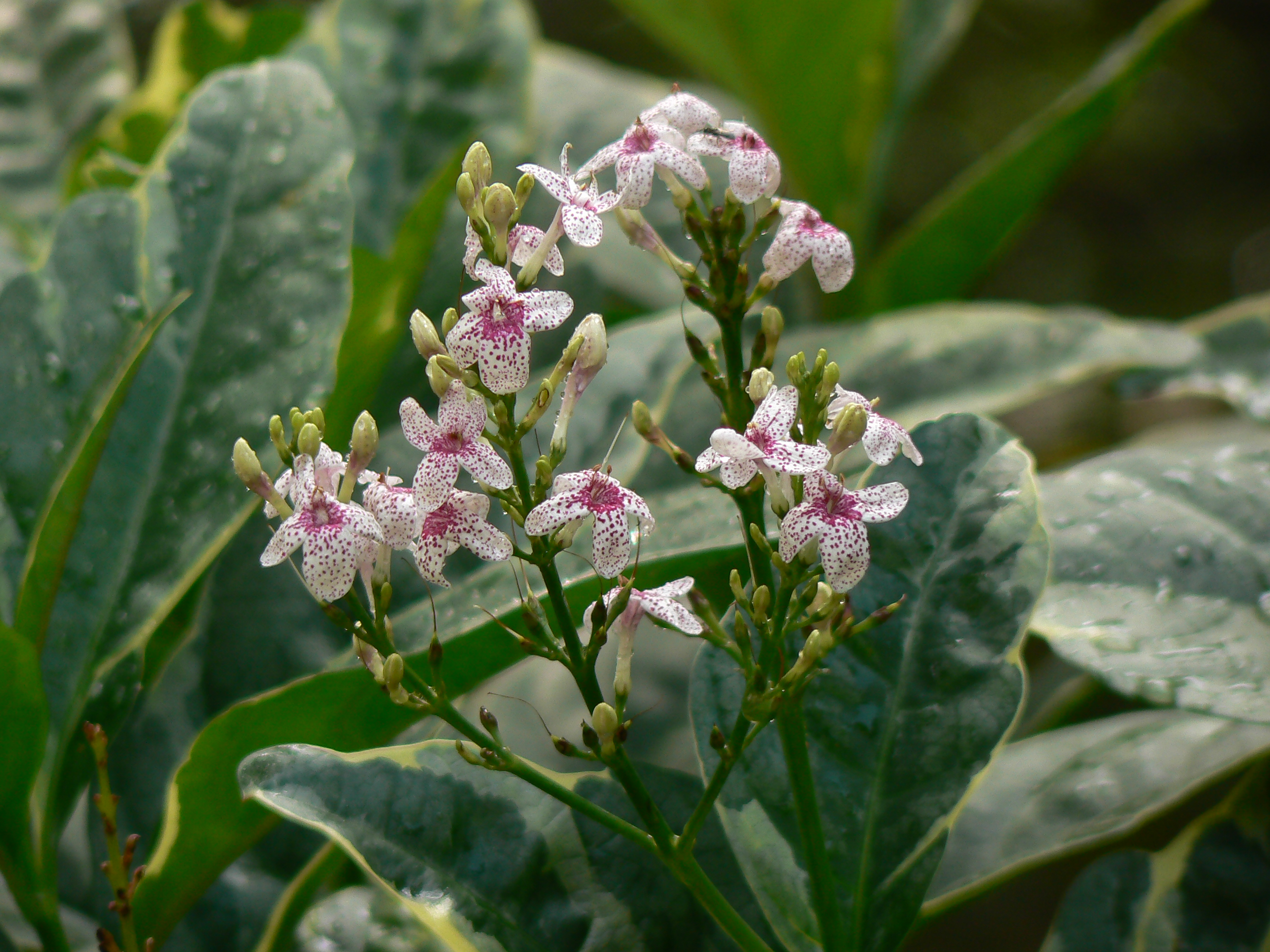
Flowers

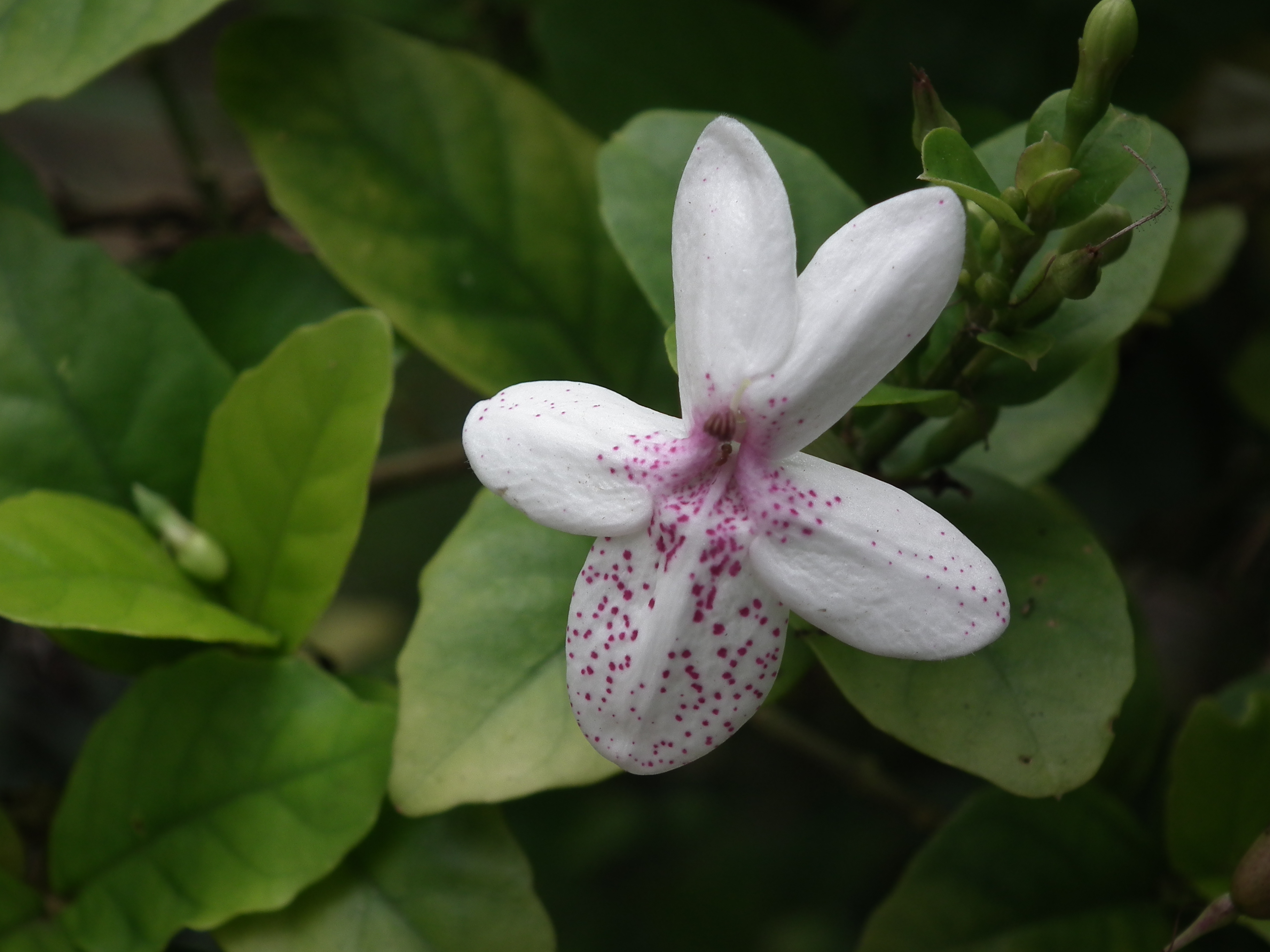

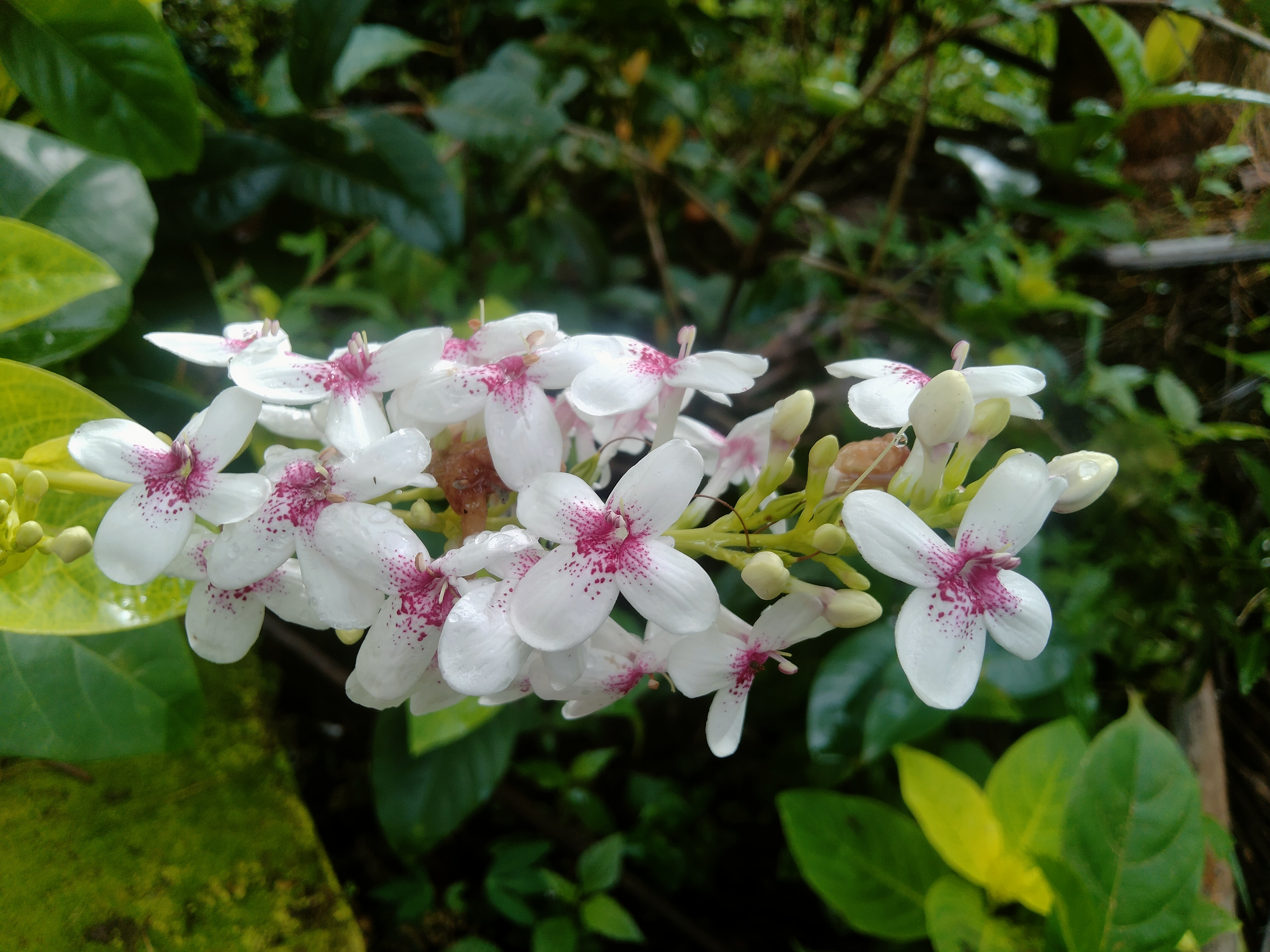
