= Pseuderanthemum subauriculatum =

Conservation status
- Near Threatened (IUCN 3.1)

Scientific classification
- Kingdom: Plantae
- Clade: Embryophytes
- Clade: Tracheophytes
- Clade: Angiosperms
- Clade: Eudicots
- Clade: Asterids
- Order: Lamiales
- Family: Acanthaceae
- Genus: Pseuderanthemum
- Species: P. subauriculatum

Binomial name
- Pseuderanthemum subauriculatum Mildbr.

Species of flowering plant

Pseuderanthemum subauriculatum is a species of flowering plant in the family Acanthaceae. It is endemic to Ecuador. Its natural habitat is subtropical or tropical moist lowland forests. It is threatened by habitat loss.
