= Pseuderanthemum hookerianum =

Conservation status
- Least Concern (IUCN 3.1)

Scientific classification
- Kingdom: Plantae
- Clade: Tracheophytes
- Clade: Angiosperms
- Clade: Eudicots
- Clade: Asterids
- Order: Lamiales
- Family: Acanthaceae
- Genus: Pseuderanthemum
- Species: P. hookerianum

Binomial name
- Pseuderanthemum hookerianum (Nees) V.M.Baum

Species of flowering plant

Pseuderanthemum hookerianum is a species of plant in the family Acanthaceae. It is endemic to Ecuador. Its natural habitats are subtropical or tropical moist lowland forests and subtropical or tropical moist montane forests. It is threatened by habitat loss.
