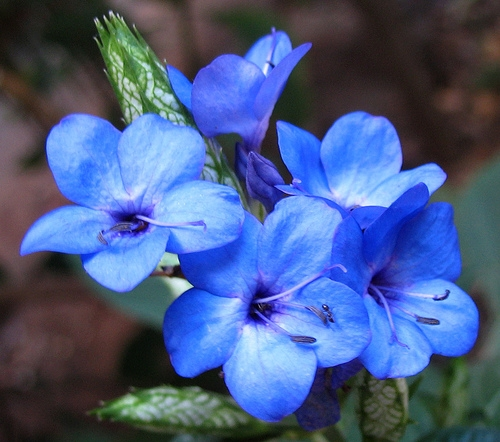
- Eranthemum pulchellum

Scientific classification
- Kingdom: Plantae
- Clade: Tracheophytes
- Clade: Angiosperms
- Clade: Eudicots
- Clade: Asterids
- Order: Lamiales
- Family: Acanthaceae
- Tribe: Ruellieae
- Subtribe: Erantheminae
- Genus: Eranthemum; L. (1753)

Species
- 23; see text

Synonyms
- Citharella Noronha (1790), nom. nud.; Daedalacanthus T.Anderson (1860); Upudalia Raf. (1838)

= Eranthemum =

Genus of plants

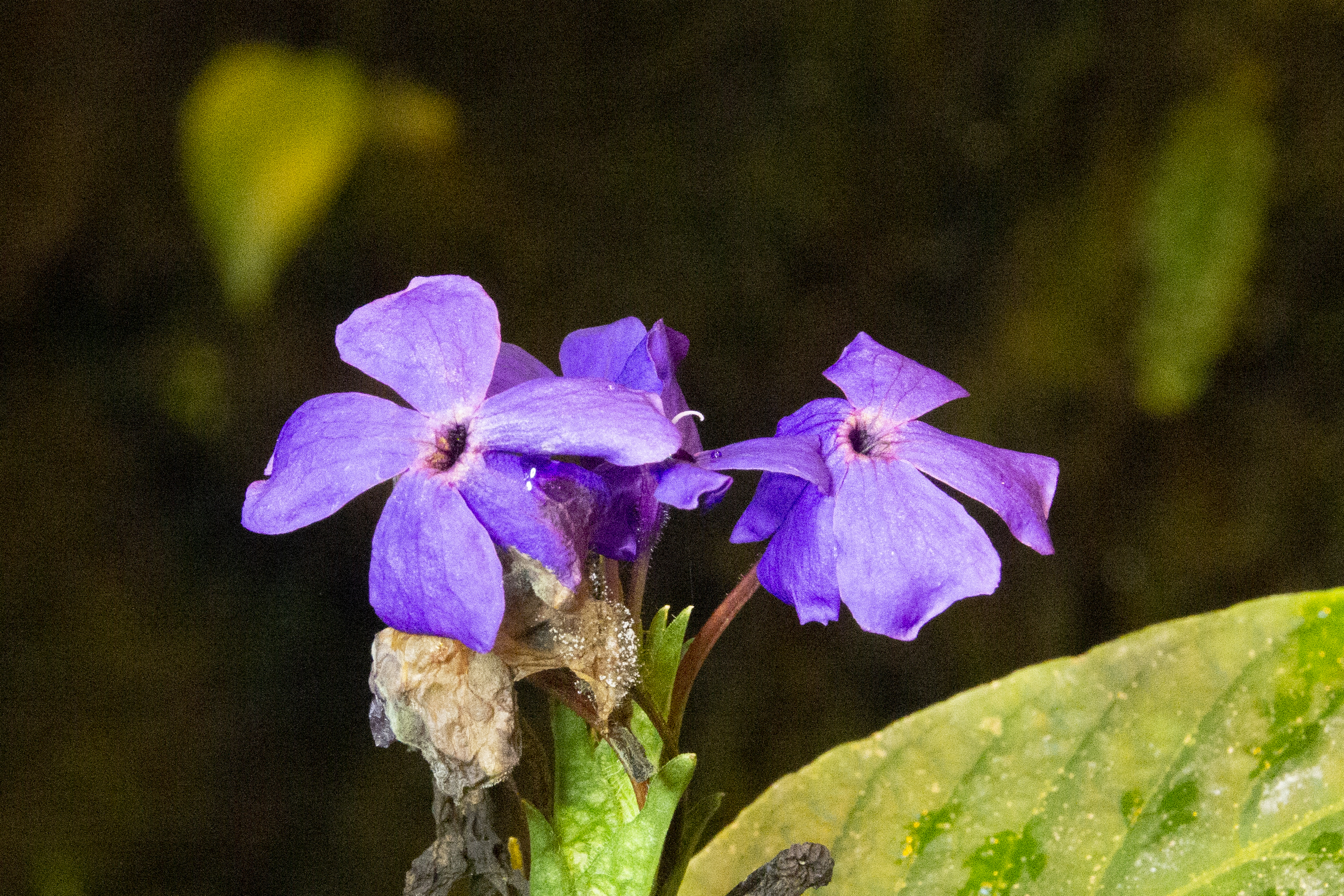
Eranthemum purpurascens MHNT

Eranthemum is a genus of plants in the family Acanthaceae. It includes 23 species native to the Indian subcontinent, Indochina, southern China, Sumatra, and Java.

== Species ==
23 species are accepted.

- Eranthemum austrosinense H.S.Lo
- Eranthemum burmanicum N.P.Balakr.
- Eranthemum capense L.
- Eranthemum ciliatum (Craib) Benoist
- Eranthemum decumbens Kladwong & Chantar.
- Eranthemum erythrochilum J.R.I.Wood
- Eranthemum griffithii (T.Anderson) Bremek. & Nann.-Bremek.
- Eranthemum macrophyllum Wall. ex Nees
- Eranthemum macrostachyum (T.Anderson) N.P.Balakr.
- Eranthemum obovatum Imlay
- Eranthemum pubescens Roth
- Eranthemum pulchellum Andrews
- Eranthemum purpurascens Wight ex Nees
- Eranthemum roseum (Vahl) R.Br. ex Roem. & Schult.
- Eranthemum splendens (T.Anderson) Bremek. & Nann.-Bremek.
- Eranthemum strictum Colebr. ex Roxb.
- Eranthemum suffruticosum Roxb.
- Eranthemum sumatranum Bremek. & Nann.-Bremek.
- Eranthemum tetragonum Wall. ex Nees
- Eranthemum tubiflorum (T.Anderson) Radlk. ex Lindau
- Eranthemum viscidum Blume
- Eranthemum wardii (W.W.Sm.) N.P.Balakr.
- Eranthemum wattii (Bedd.) Stapf
