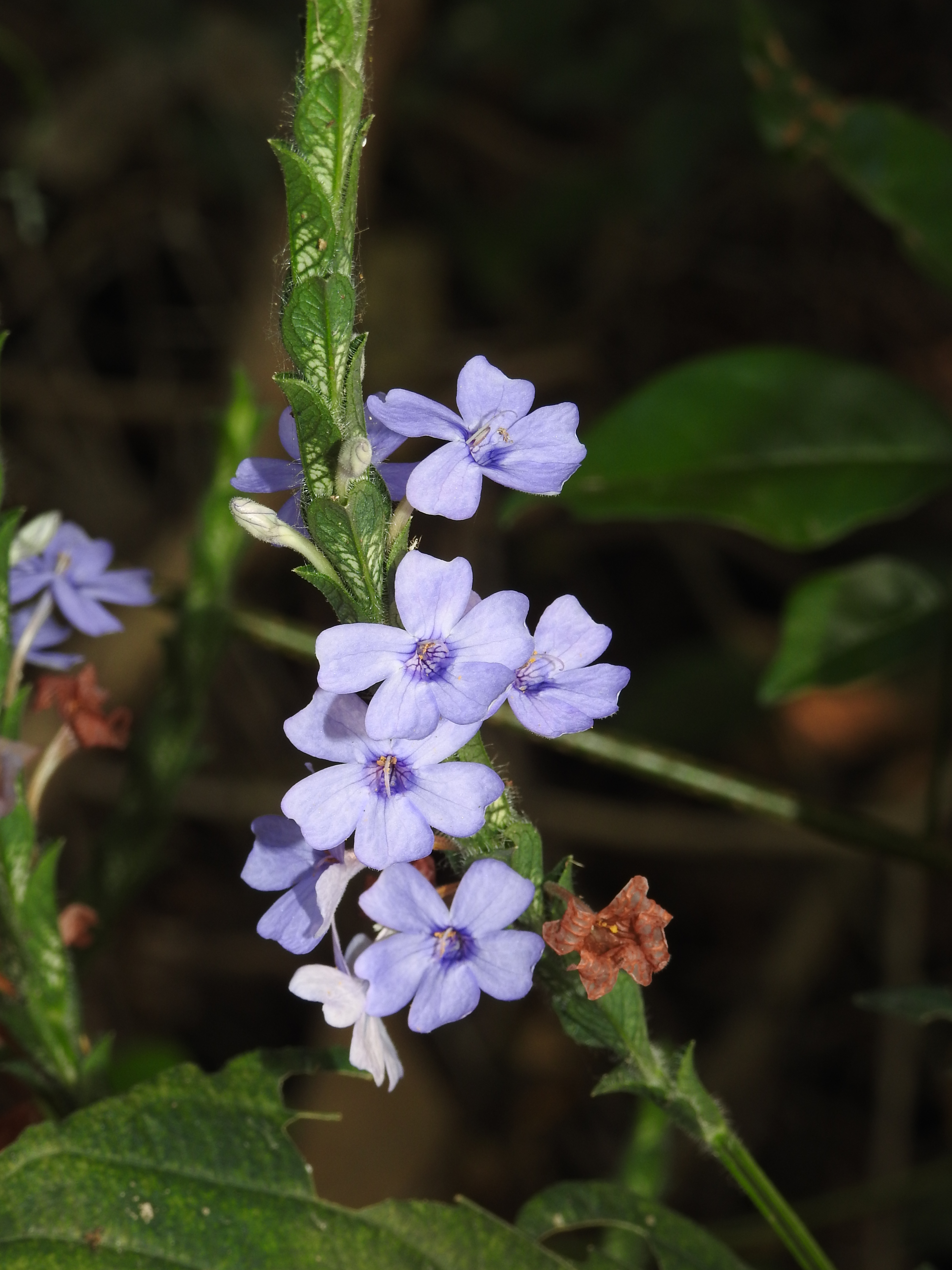

Scientific classification
- Kingdom: Plantae
- Clade: Tracheophytes
- Clade: Angiosperms
- Clade: Eudicots
- Clade: Asterids
- Order: Lamiales
- Family: Acanthaceae
- Genus: Eranthemum
- Species: E. roseum

Binomial name
- Eranthemum roseum (Vahl) R.Br.

Synonyms
- Justicia rosea (Vahl) R. Br.

= Eranthemum roseum =

Species of flowering plant

Eranthemum roseum, also known as blue eranthemum, rosy eranthemum (Marathi: dasmuli, दसमुळी; jangali aboli, जंगली अबोली ) is a native of the Western Ghats of India. The plant has tuberous roots, and grows to a height of ten in numbers, hence the local name, dasmuli.
