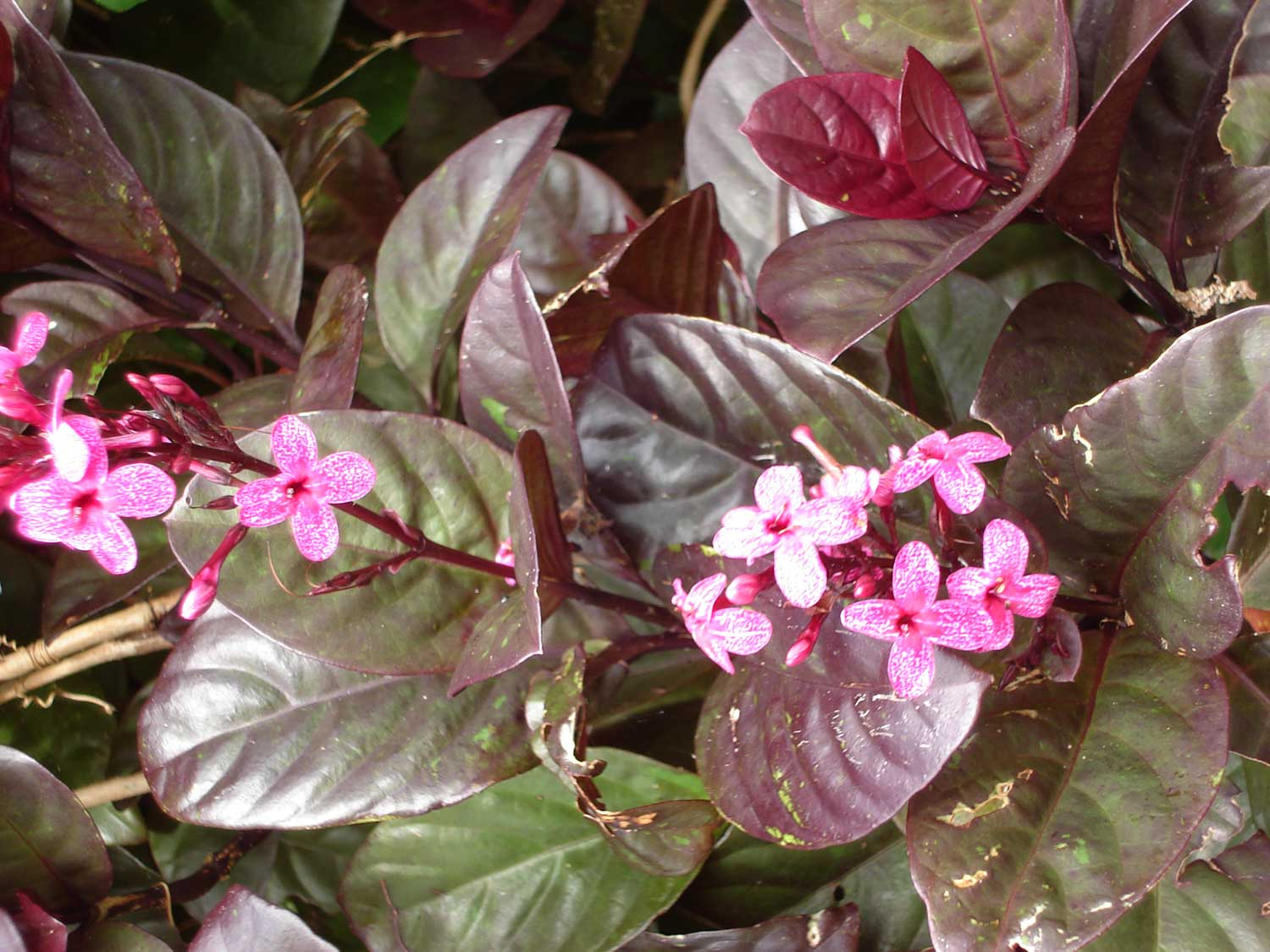
- Pseuderanthemum carruthersii var atropurpureum

Scientific classification
- Kingdom: Plantae
- Clade: Tracheophytes
- Clade: Angiosperms
- Clade: Eudicots
- Clade: Asterids
- Order: Lamiales
- Family: Acanthaceae
- Subfamily: Acanthoideae
- Tribe: Justicieae
- Genus: Pseuderanthemum; Radlk.

Species
- See text.

Synonyms
- Eranthemum T.Anderson; Aldelaster K.Koch; Antheliacanthus Ridl.; Buceragenia Greenm.; Chrestienia Montrouz. ex Beauvis.; Odontonemella Lindau; Pigafetta Adans.; Planetanthemum (Endl.) Kuntze; Siphoneranthemum (Oerst.) Kuntze

= Pseuderanthemum =

Genus of plants

Pseuderanthemum is a genus of plants in family Acanthaceae with a pantropical distribution.

== Species ==
The following 130 species are accepted by Plants of the World Online as of September 2022

- Pseuderanthemum alatum (Nees) Radlk.
- Pseuderanthemum albiflorum (Hook.) Radlk.
- Pseuderanthemum album (Roxb.) Radlk.
- Pseuderanthemum angustifolium Ridl.
- Pseuderanthemum armitii S.Moore
- Pseuderanthemum arunachalense D.Borah, R.Kr.Singh & Taram
- Pseuderanthemum aubertii Benoist
- Pseuderanthemum bibracteatum Fosberg
- Pseuderanthemum bicolor (Schrank) Radlk.
- Pseuderanthemum bracteatum J.B.Imlay
- Pseuderanthemum bradtkei S.Moore
- Pseuderanthemum breviflos (C.B.Clarke) Ridl.
- Pseuderanthemum campylosiphon Mildbr.
- Pseuderanthemum candidum (Ridl.) Ridl.
- Pseuderanthemum caudifolium (C.B.Clarke) Ridl.
- Pseuderanthemum chaponense Leonard
- Pseuderanthemum chilianthium Leonard
- Pseuderanthemum chocoense Leonard
- Pseuderanthemum cinnabarinum (Wall.) Radlk.
- Pseuderanthemum cladodes Leonard
- Pseuderanthemum comptonii S.Moore
- Pseuderanthemum confertum S.Moore
- Pseuderanthemum confusum Merr.
- Pseuderanthemum congestum (S.Moore) Wassh.
- Pseuderanthemum coudercii Benoist
- Pseuderanthemum crenulatum (Wall. ex Lindl.) Radlk.
- Pseuderanthemum ctenospermum Leonard
- Pseuderanthemum curtatum (C.B.Clarke) Merr.
- Pseuderanthemum cuspidatum (Nees) Radlk.
- Pseuderanthemum dawei Turrill
- Pseuderanthemum detruncatum (Nees & Mart.) Radlk.
- Pseuderanthemum diachylum Leonard
- Pseuderanthemum diantherum (Roxb.) I.M.Turner
- Pseuderanthemum dispermum Milne-Redh.
- Pseuderanthemum diversifolium (Miq.) Radlk.
- Pseuderanthemum eberhardtii Benoist
- Pseuderanthemum ellipticum Turrill
- Pseuderanthemum exaequatum (Nees) Radlk.
- Pseuderanthemum fasciculatum (Kuntze) Leonard
- Pseuderanthemum floribundum T.F.Daniel
- Pseuderanthemum fruticosum (Elmer) Merr.
- Pseuderanthemum galbanum Leonard
- Pseuderanthemum glomeratum J.B.Imlay
- Pseuderanthemum graciliflorum (Nees) Ridl.
- Pseuderanthemum grandiflorum (Benth.) Domin
- Pseuderanthemum guerrerense Cruz Durán & S.Valencia
- Pseuderanthemum haikangense C.Y.Wu & H.S.Lo
- Pseuderanthemum heterophyllum (Nees) Radlk.
- Pseuderanthemum hildebrandtii (C.B.Clarke) Lindau
- Pseuderanthemum hirtipistillum (C.B.Clarke) Ridl.
- Pseuderanthemum hispidulum (Nees) Radlk.
- Pseuderanthemum hookerianum (Nees) V.M.Baum
- Pseuderanthemum hooveri Wassh.
- Pseuderanthemum huegelii (Burkill) K.Schum.
- Pseuderanthemum hylophilum Leonard
- Pseuderanthemum idroboi Leonard
- Pseuderanthemum incisum Benoist
- Pseuderanthemum inclusum Hosok.
- Pseuderanthemum interruptum (Kunth) V.M.Baum
- Pseuderanthemum katangense Champl.
- Pseuderanthemum kingii (C.B.Clarke) Ridl.
- Pseuderanthemum lanceolatum (Ruiz & Pav.) Wassh.
- Pseuderanthemum lanceophyllum Choopan
- Pseuderanthemum lanceum (Nees) Radlk.
- Pseuderanthemum lapathifolium (Vahl) B.Hansen
- Pseuderanthemum latifolium (Vahl) B.Hansen
- Pseuderanthemum laxiflorum (A.Gray) F.T.Hubb.
- Pseuderanthemum leiophyllum Leonard
- Pseuderanthemum leptanthum (C.B.Clarke) Lindau
- Pseuderanthemum leptorhachis Lindau
- Pseuderanthemum leptostachys Leonard
- Pseuderanthemum leptostachyum (Nees) Radlk.
- Pseuderanthemum liesneri T.F.Daniel
- Pseuderanthemum lilacinum Stapf
- Pseuderanthemum longifolium (G.Forst.) Guillaumin
- Pseuderanthemum longistylum J.B.Imlay
- Pseuderanthemum ludovicianum (Büttner) Lindau
- Pseuderanthemum macgregorii Lindau
- Pseuderanthemum macrophyllum (Kuntze) Radlk.
- Pseuderanthemum maculatum (G.Lodd.) I.M.Turner
- Pseuderanthemum maguirei Leonard
- Pseuderanthemum melanesicum Gâteblé, Ramon & Butaud
- Pseuderanthemum metallicum Hallier
- Pseuderanthemum micranthum Leonard
- Pseuderanthemum minutiflorum (Elmer) Merr.
- Pseuderanthemum modestum (Nees ex Mart.) Radlk.
- Pseuderanthemum muelleri-fernandii Lindau
- Pseuderanthemum orientalis Wassh.
- Pseuderanthemum pacificum (Engl.) Lindau
- Pseuderanthemum palauense Fosberg & Sachet
- Pseuderanthemum paniculatum (Blume) Radlk.
- Pseuderanthemum parishii (T.Anderson) Lindau
- Pseuderanthemum pelagicum (Seem.) P.S.Green
- Pseuderanthemum pihuamoense T.F.Daniel
- Pseuderanthemum pittieri Leonard
- Pseuderanthemum poilanei Benoist
- Pseuderanthemum polyanthum (C.B.Clarke ex Oliv.) Merr.
- Pseuderanthemum potamophilum Leonard
- Pseuderanthemum praecox (Benth.) Leonard
- Pseuderanthemum pubescens Choopan & Grote
- Pseuderanthemum pumilum Lindau
- Pseuderanthemum racemosum (Roxb.) Radlk.
- Pseuderanthemum repandum (G.Forst.) Guillaumin
- Pseuderanthemum riedelianum (Nees) Radlk.
- Pseuderanthemum selangorense (C.B.Clarke) Ridl.
- Pseuderanthemum shweliense (W.W.Sm.) C.Y.Wu & C.C.Hu
- Pseuderanthemum siamense J.B.Imlay
- Pseuderanthemum sneidernii Leonard
- Pseuderanthemum sorongense Bremek.
- Pseuderanthemum standleyi Leonard
- Pseuderanthemum stenosiphon Leonard
- Pseuderanthemum stenostachyum (Leonard) V.M.Baum
- Pseuderanthemum subauriculatum Mildbr.
- Pseuderanthemum subviscosum (C.B.Clarke) Stapf
- Pseuderanthemum sumatrense (Ridl.) Merr.
- Pseuderanthemum sylvestre Ridl.
- Pseuderanthemum teijsmannii (T.Anderson) Stapf
- Pseuderanthemum tenellum (Benth.) Radlk.
- Pseuderanthemum thailandicum Choopan & Grote
- Pseuderanthemum thelothrix Leonard
- Pseuderanthemum tomentellum Bremek.
- Pseuderanthemum tonkinense Benoist
- Pseuderanthemum tunicatum (Afzel.) Milne-Redh.
- Pseuderanthemum usambarensis Vollesen
- Pseuderanthemum variabile (R.Br.) Radlk.
- Pseuderanthemum velutinum Lindau
- Pseuderanthemum verapazense Donn.Sm.
- Pseuderanthemum verbenaceum (Nees & Mart.) Radlk.
- Pseuderanthemum viriduliflorum Bremek.
- Pseuderanthemum weberbaueri Mildbr.
