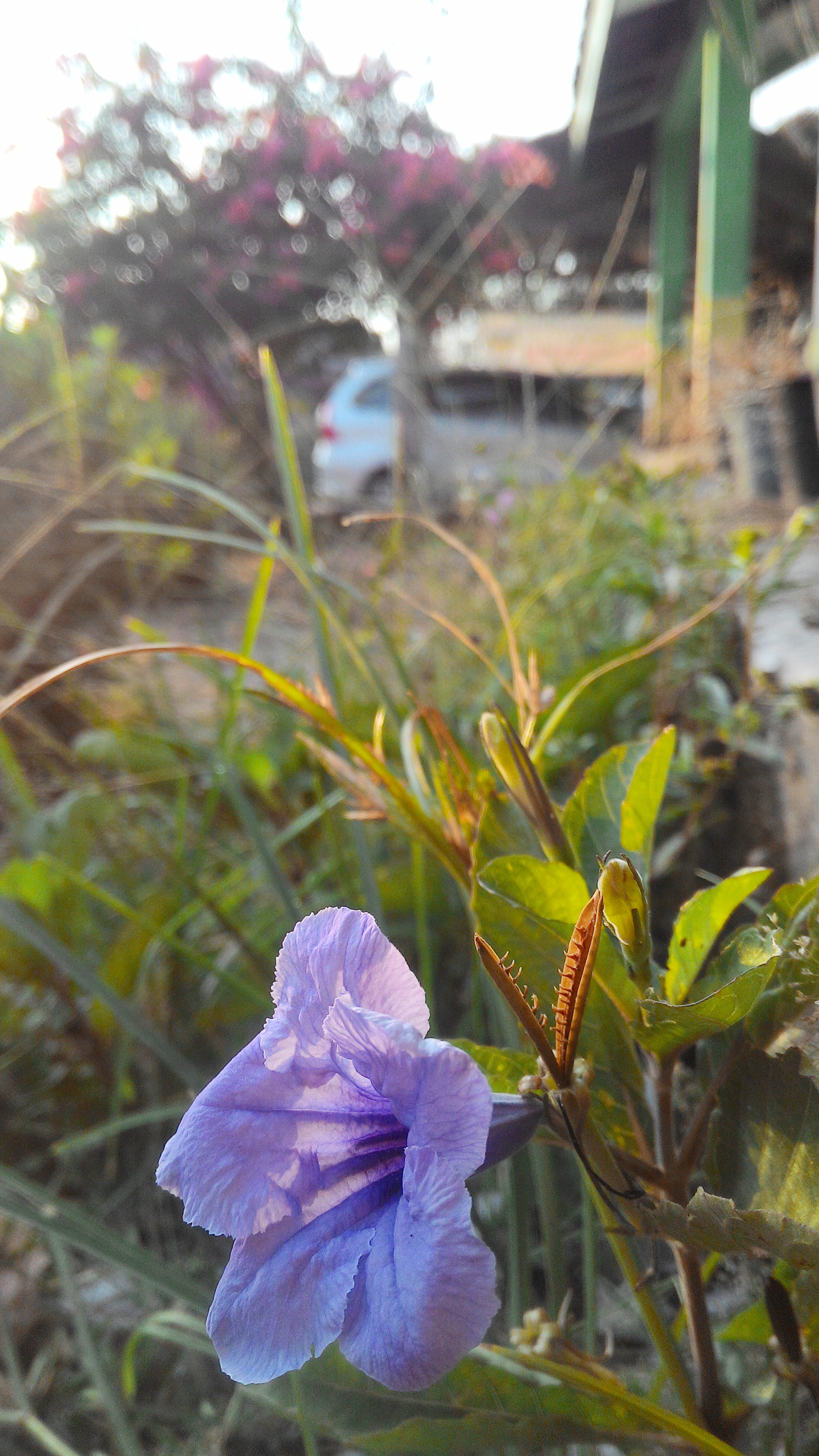
- A flower & dry popping pod popped in a tree

Scientific classification
- Kingdom: Plantae
- Clade: Tracheophytes
- Clade: Angiosperms
- Clade: Eudicots
- Clade: Asterids
- Order: Lamiales
- Family: Acanthaceae
- Genus: Ruellia
- Species: R. tuberosa

Binomial name
- Ruellia tuberosa L.

Synonyms
- Cryphiacanthus barbadensis Nees; Dipteracanthus clandestinus C.Presl; Ruellia clandestina L.; Ruellia picta (Lodd. et al.)

= Ruellia tuberosa =

Species of flowering plant

Ruellia tuberosa, also known as minnieroot, fever root, snapdragon root and sheep potato (Thai: ต้อยติ่ง), is a species of flowering plant in the family Acanthaceae. Its native range is in Central America but it has become naturalized in Africa (Tanzania in particular), South and Southeast Asia.

Some butterfly species, like the lemon pansy (Junonia lemonias) and the mangrove buckeye (Junonia genoveva), feed on the leaves of Ruellia tuberosa.

== Description and properties ==
It is a small biennial plant with thick fusiform tuberous roots and striking funnel-shaped violet-colored flowers. Its fruit is a 2 cm (0.8 in) long sessile capsule containing about 20 seeds. Some of the names of the plant such as popping pod, duppy gun and cracker plant come from the fact that children like to play with the dry pods that pop when rubbed with spit or water.

Ruellia tuberosa may be found in moist and shady environments. It grows, however, preferably in grasslands and roadsides—often as a weed in cultivated fields, and also in xerophile and ruderal habitats.

In folk medicine and Ayurvedic medicine it is believed to be diuretic, anti-diabetic, antipyretic, analgesic, antihypertensive, and gastroprotective, and has been used for gonorrhea.

It is also used as a natural dye for textiles.

== See also ==
Pods crack in water with pop sound. A dry pod can pop within 1 to 3 seconds.

- 21540 Itthipanyanan, an asteroid named after the author of an award-winning study on Ruellia tuberosa
