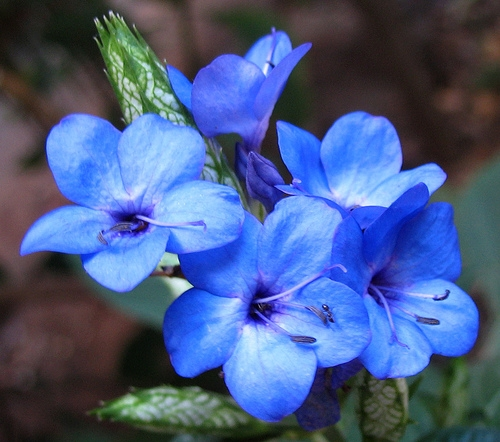

Scientific classification
- Kingdom: Plantae
- Clade: Tracheophytes
- Clade: Angiosperms
- Clade: Eudicots
- Clade: Asterids
- Order: Lamiales
- Family: Acanthaceae
- Genus: Eranthemum
- Species: E. pulchellum

Binomial name
- Eranthemum pulchellum Andrews

Synonyms
- Eranthemum nervosum (Vahl) R.Br. ex Roem. & Schult.

= Eranthemum pulchellum =

Species of flowering plant

Eranthemum pulchellum, the blue eranthemum or blue sage, is a species of flowering plant in the acanthus family Acanthaceae, native to the Himalayas, western China, India and Nepal. A strongly branched evergreen shrub, it is popular with gardeners because of the spikes of flowers that are bright gentian blue – an unusual color in the tropics. The flowers appear from green-and-white veined bracts that remain after the blooms fall, forming a column several centimetres long. The hairy leaves are large and dark green. A sprawling shrub which may reach a metre or more in height, E. pulchellum is usually kept lower and bushier through pruning. Light shade is preferred in a garden; in a greenhouse it needs warm conditions. It is easily propagated from cuttings.

The Latin specific epithet pulchellum means "beautiful".

In the UK this plant has gained the Royal Horticultural Society's Award of Garden Merit.
