= Clara Barthold Mayer =

Swiss artist (born late 18th century)

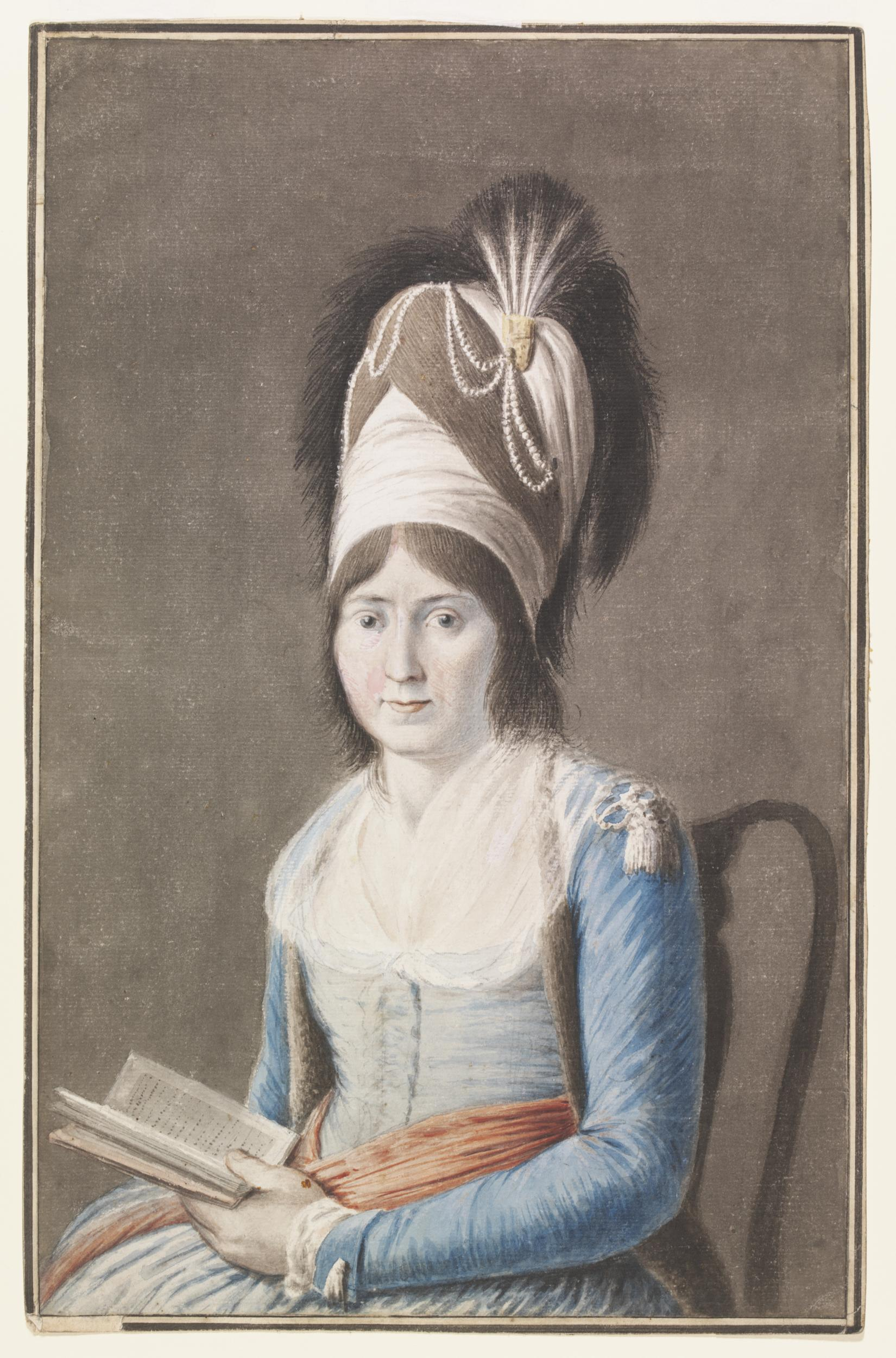
Clara Barthold Mayer, by Luigi Mayer (1799)

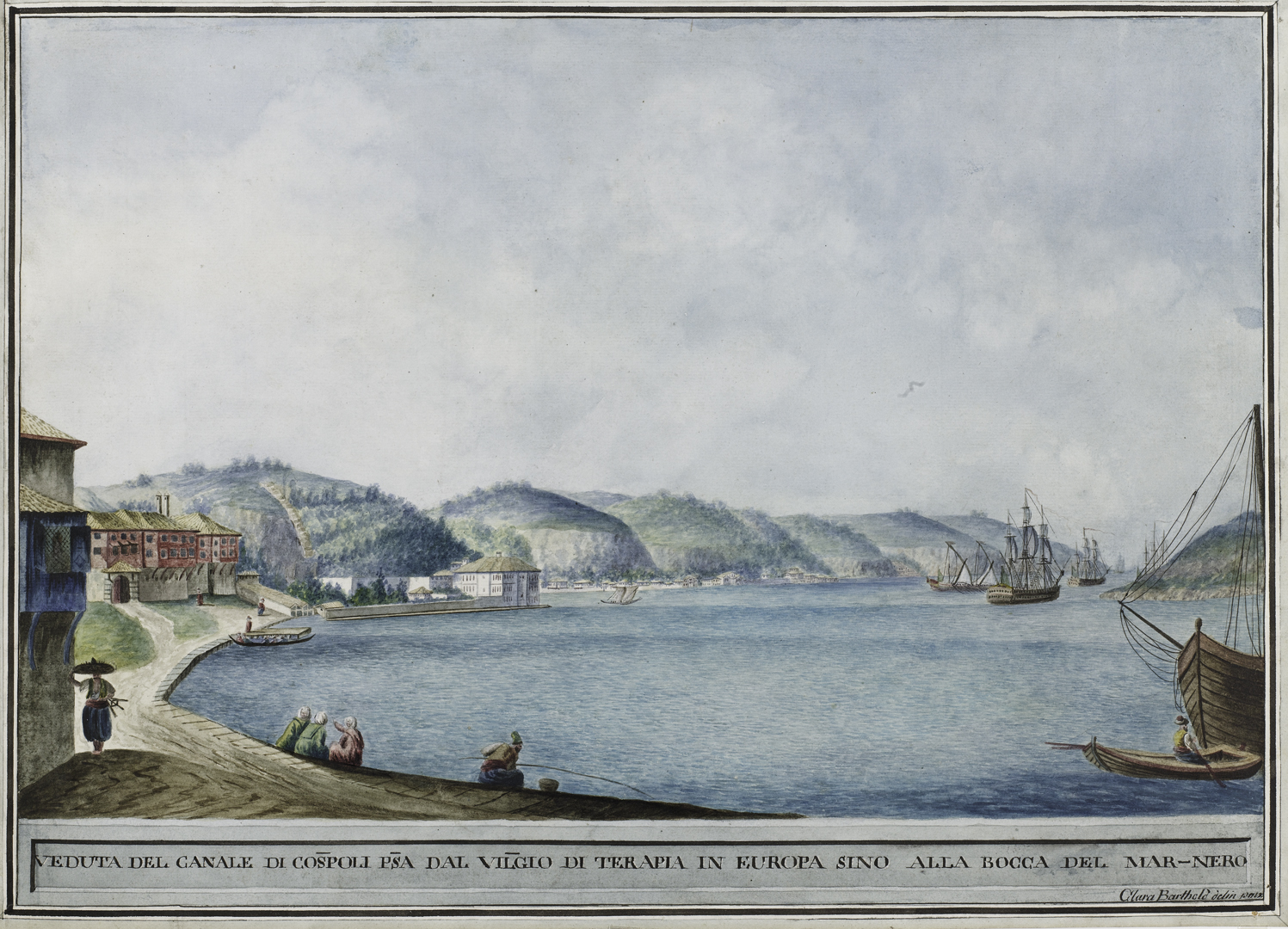
View of the Bosporus from Tarabya to the Black Sea entrance

Clara Barthold Mayer (born in Switzerland during the late 18th century) was an Orientalist painter who worked in Istanbul. She was married to the Italian-German painter, Luigi Mayer.

== Biography ==
It is believed that her father was serving as a dragoman for the British Ambassador to the Ottoman Empire, Sir Robert Ainslie. While there, she met the painter, Luigi Mayer, a friend of the Ambassador, and married him; becoming his assistant.

In 1794, she and Luigi moved to England, where they continued to produce watercolors designed for engraving. Clara concentrated on landscapes and her first works were published by J. Harris of London that same year. Luigi painted her portrait in Turkish clothes. A series of twenty-seven views of Istanbul and its environs were engraved by Thomas Milton and published by Thomas Bensley of Fleet Street, for the Bowyer Historic Gallery, Pall Mall, in 1801.

After Luigi's death in 1803, she continued painting, at their home in Portman Square; devoting much of her time to publishing and promoting their works.

Many of her compositions were engraved by John William Edy, and may be seen at the Victoria and Albert Museum. Her works may also be seen at the Pera Museum in Istanbul.
