= Sarah Mary Fitton =

Irish writer

Sarah Fitton
- Born: c. 1796; Dublin, County Dublin, Ireland
- Died: 30 March 1874 (aged 78); Paris, France
- Known for: Children's writer
- Notable work: Conversations on Botany (1817)

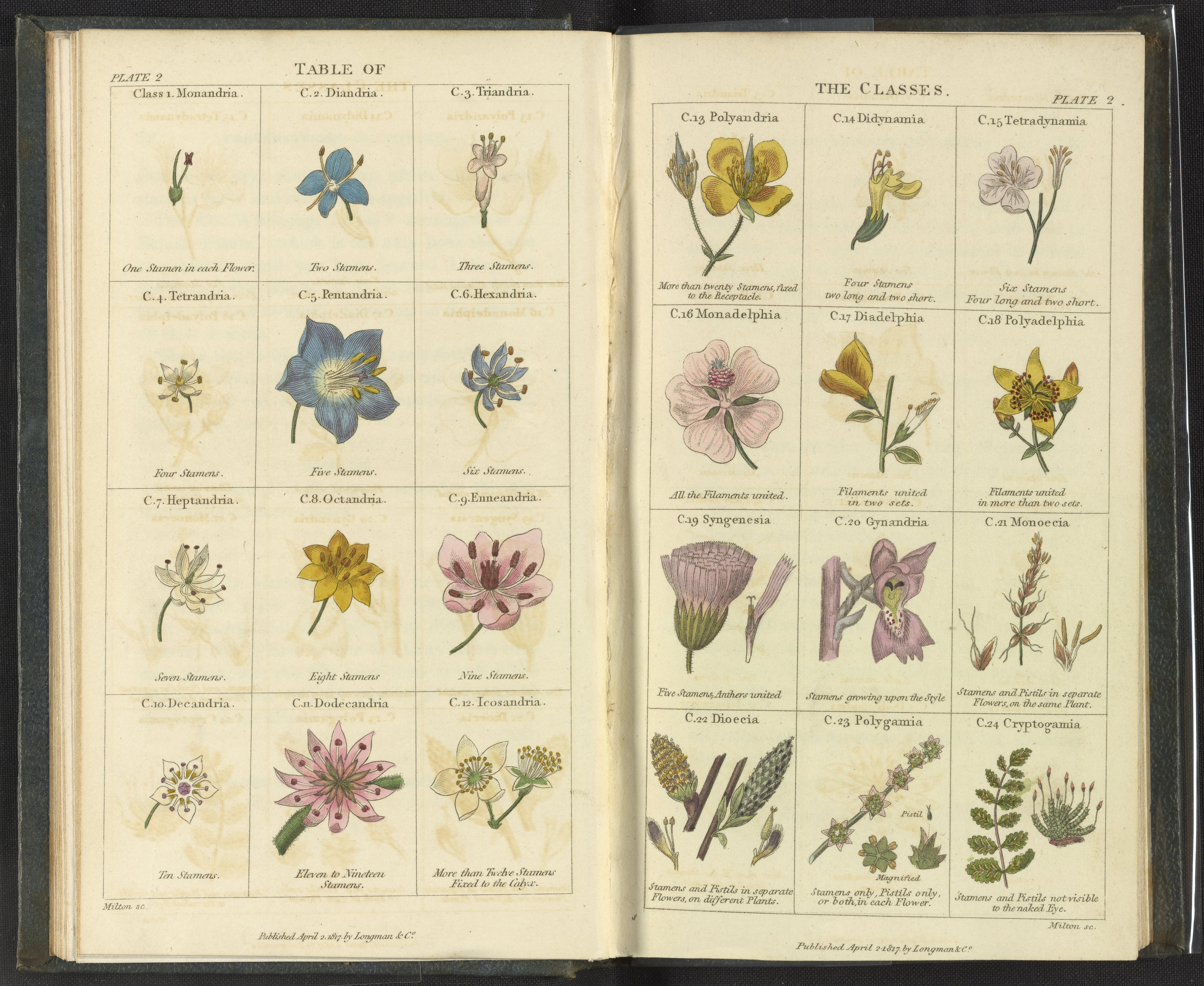
Plate 2, Table of the Classes, Conversations on Botany, 1817, engraved by Thomas Milton

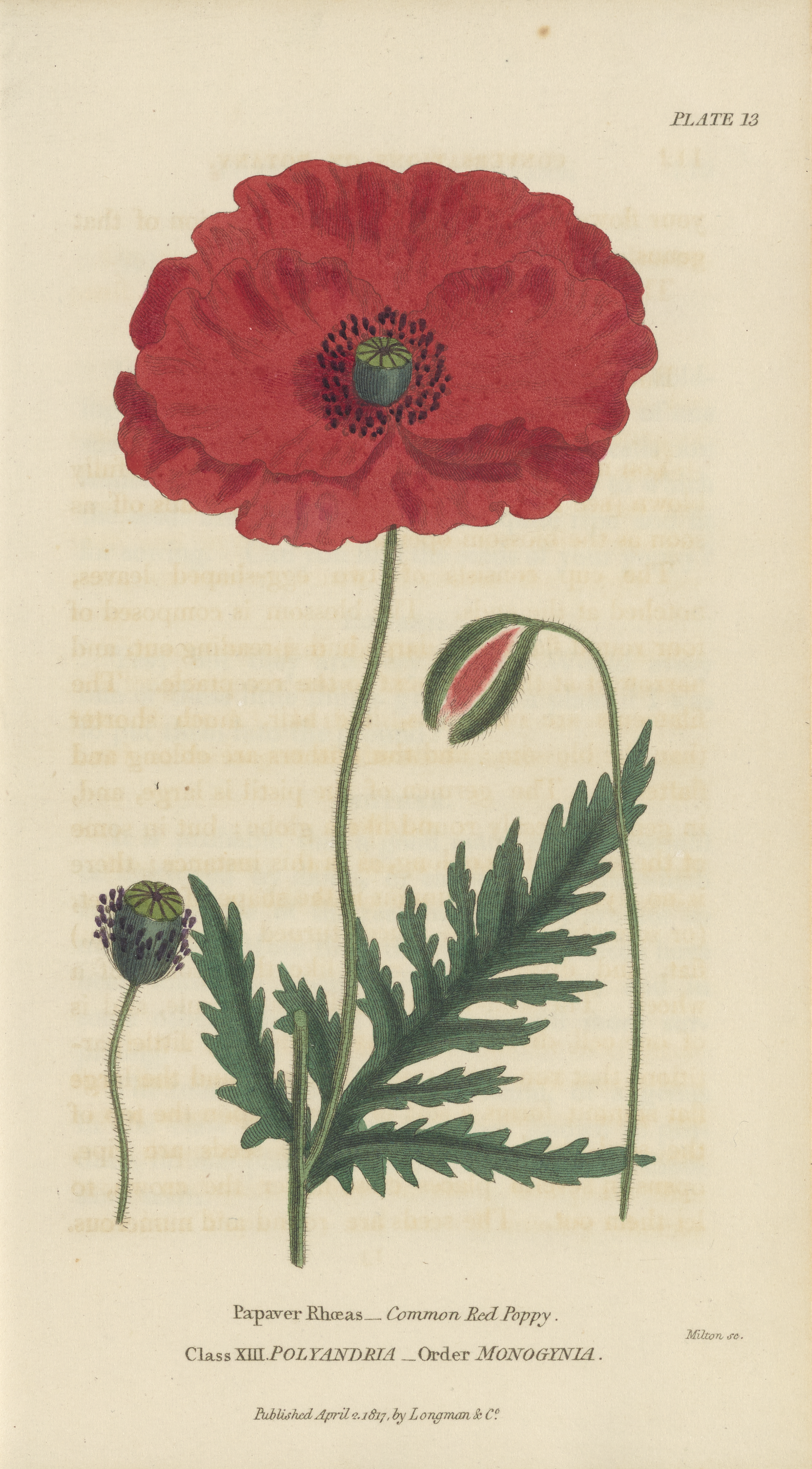
Common red poppy, Papaver rhoeas, Conversations on Botany, 1817, engr. Thomas Milton

Sarah Fitton (c. 1796 – 30 March 1874) was an Irish writer and botanist. Assisted by her sister Elizabeth, Sarah Fitton wrote Conversations on Botany (1817), framed as a series of conversations between a mother and her son on botany and the principles of Linnaean taxonomy. The book focuses on the identification and use of plants in a domestic setting, and influenced the popularity of botany as a field of scientific study for women. Color engravings differ between editions of the book.

== Life ==
Sarah Mary (or Margaret) Fitton was born in Dublin to Nicholas Fitton, a Dublin attorney, and his wife Jane Greene. She had one brother, William Henry Fitton, and two sisters, Elizabeth (fl. 1817–1834) and Susanna. For much of their lives, Sarah, her sisters and her mother were satellites of their brother William, following him to Edinburgh, Northampton, and London. William was trained as a physician and was by avocation a geologist. He was active in scientific circles both professionally and socially, including among his circle of friends such notables as botanist Robert Brown, of the Linnean Society of London. In 1817, Sarah and Elizabeth Fitton published Conversations on Botany. In 1820, William married heiress Maria James, enabling him to give up medical practice, follow his interests as a gentlemen scientist and travel extensively.

Sarah Fitton may have taken a position as a governess in France at some point, as she describes such a situation in How I became a governess (1861). In addition to her popularization of botany, Fitton wrote other instructional books and short stories for children. Her Conversations on Harmony (1855), a work on music, was dedicated to Cipriani Potter of the Royal Academy of Music in London. It was published in both English and French. Little by Little (1857) consisted of lessons in reading music. Her last book was published in 1866.

As a contributor of short stories to Charles Dickens' Household Words, Sarah Fitton was described as "long resident in Paris", living at 15 rue Ville l'Evêque. Fitton's acquaintance in Paris included Eugène Sue, Elizabeth Barrett Browning, John Kenyon, Major Henry Carmichael-Smyth (1780–1861) and his wife Anne Carmichael-Smyth (née Becher, formerly Thackeray, 1792–1864). Mrs. Browning described Fitton in 1851 as "an elderly woman, shrewd and kind", "unmarried, & rich, & by no means young, who has called on us—& there seems to be a good deal in her".

Sarah Fitton died in Paris on 30 March 1874 at 15 rue Ville l'Evêque.

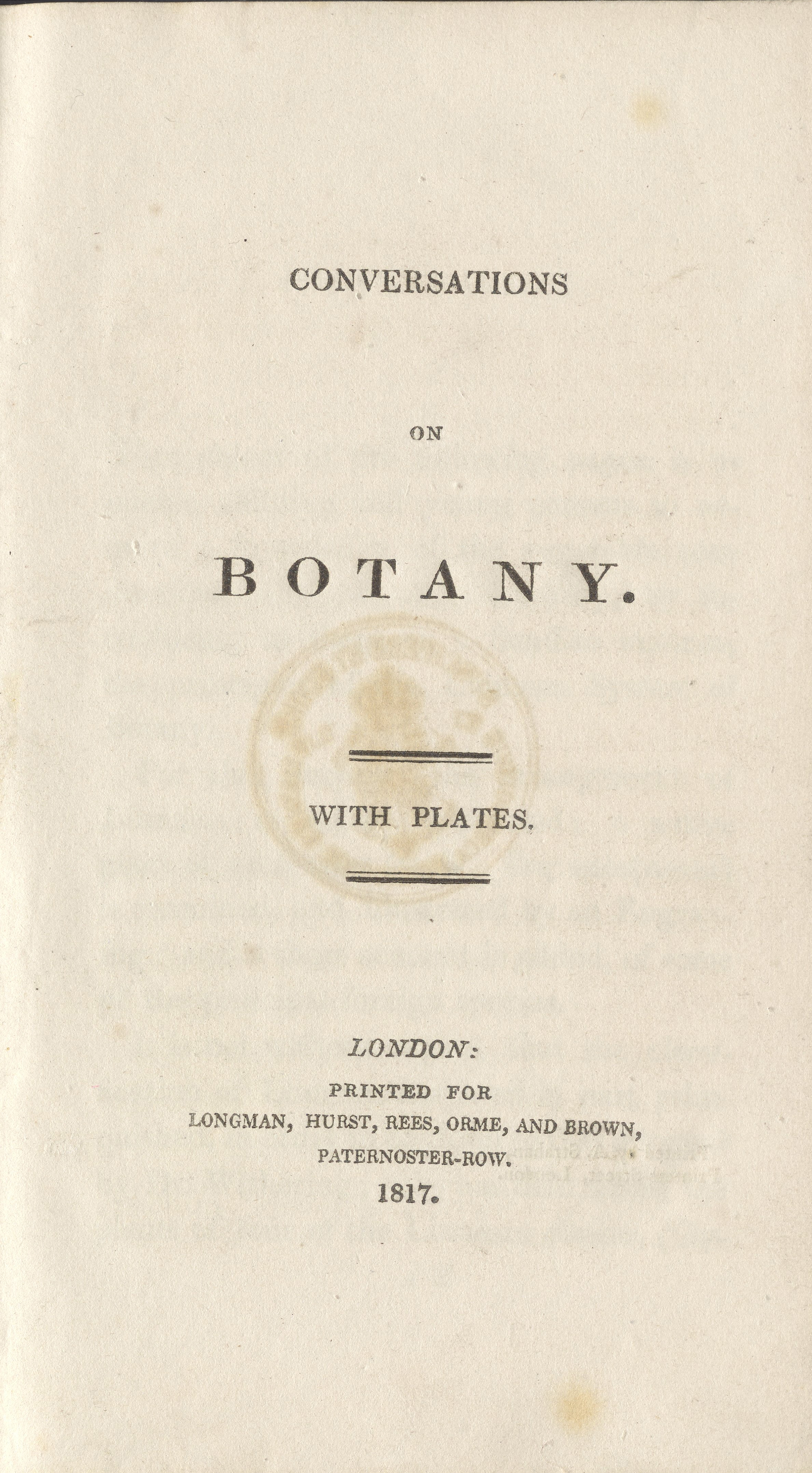
Title page, Conversations on Botany, 1817

== Writing and botanical work ==
Fitton is known for co-authoring Conversations on Botany with her sister Elizabeth, first published in 1817. Conversations on Botany went through nine editions between 1817 and 1840. The book is composed of 18 conversations between a mother and her son that cover the principles of the Linnaean system of classification and elements of useful botany. The principles of arrangement also reflect the ideas of William Withering, in A botanical arrangement of British plants. Conversations on Botany is credited, along with other contemporaneous works, with furthering the popularity of botany with women.

The earliest editions of Conversations on Botany were published anonymously, though later editions show that the majority of the text was written by Sarah Fitton, assisted by Elizabeth. Co-authorship is often erroneously attributed to Maria Elizabetha Jacson or Jane Marcet.

Selected Plates by Thomas Milton

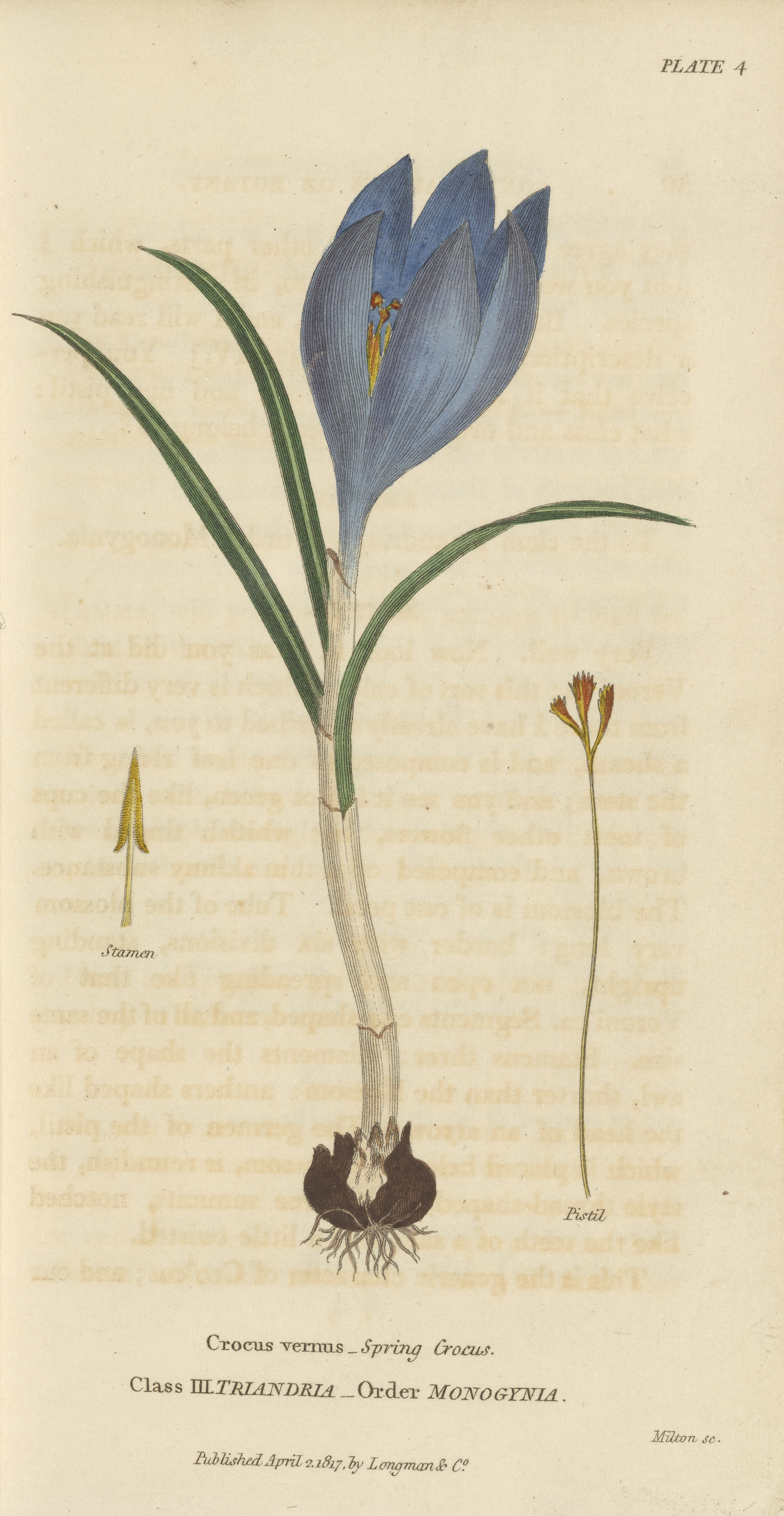
Crocus vernus

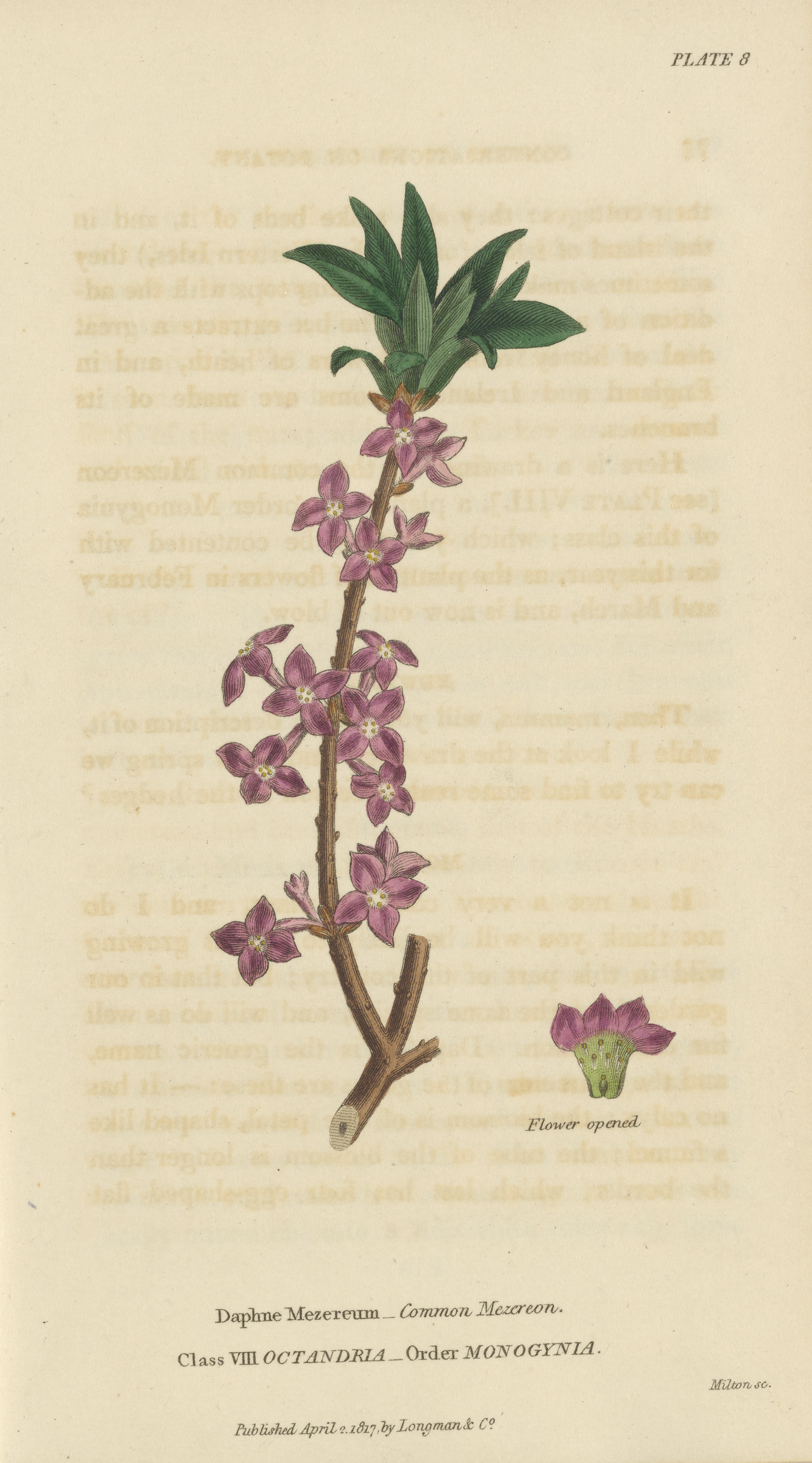
Daphne mezereum

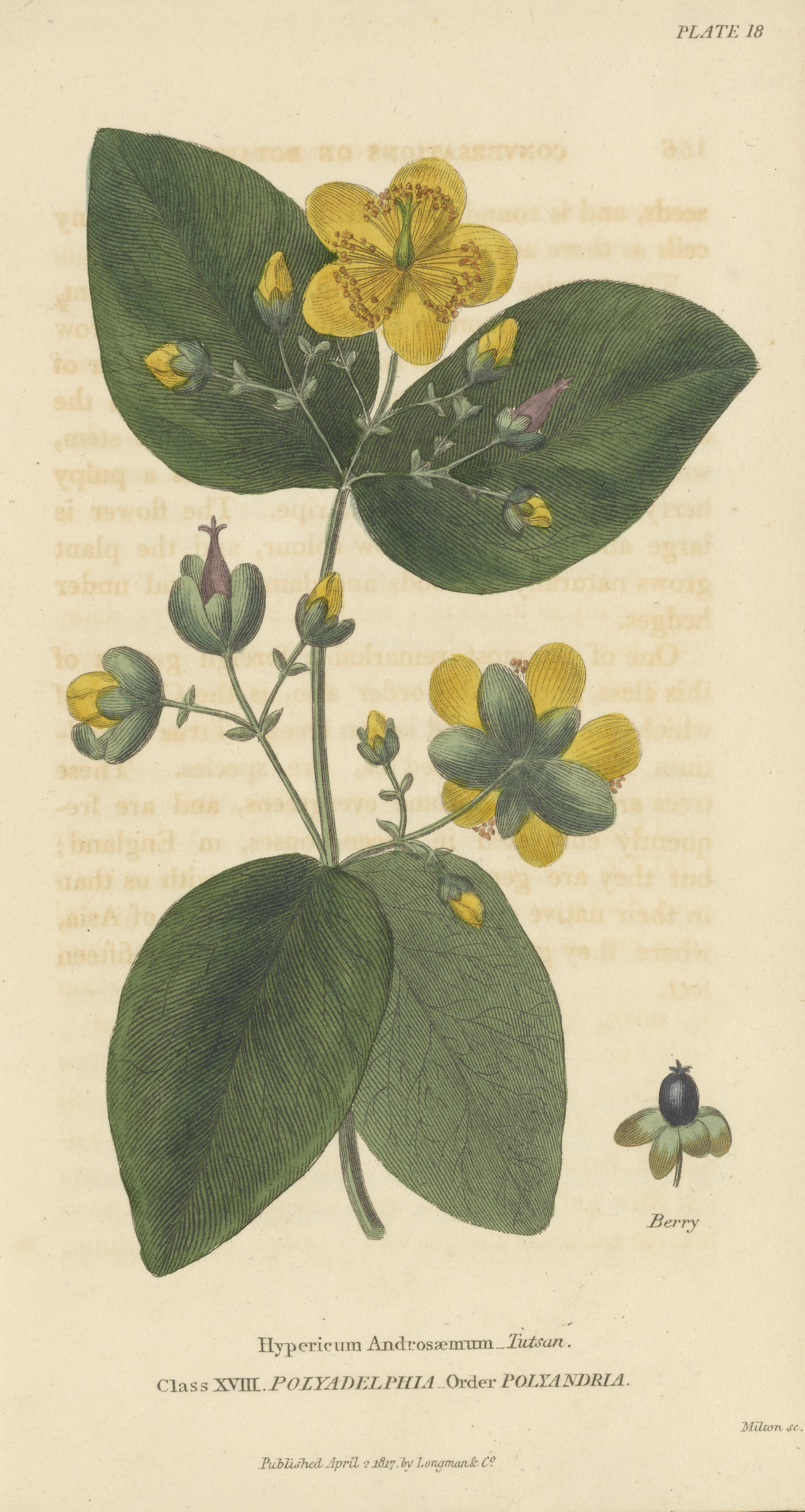
Hypericum androsaemum

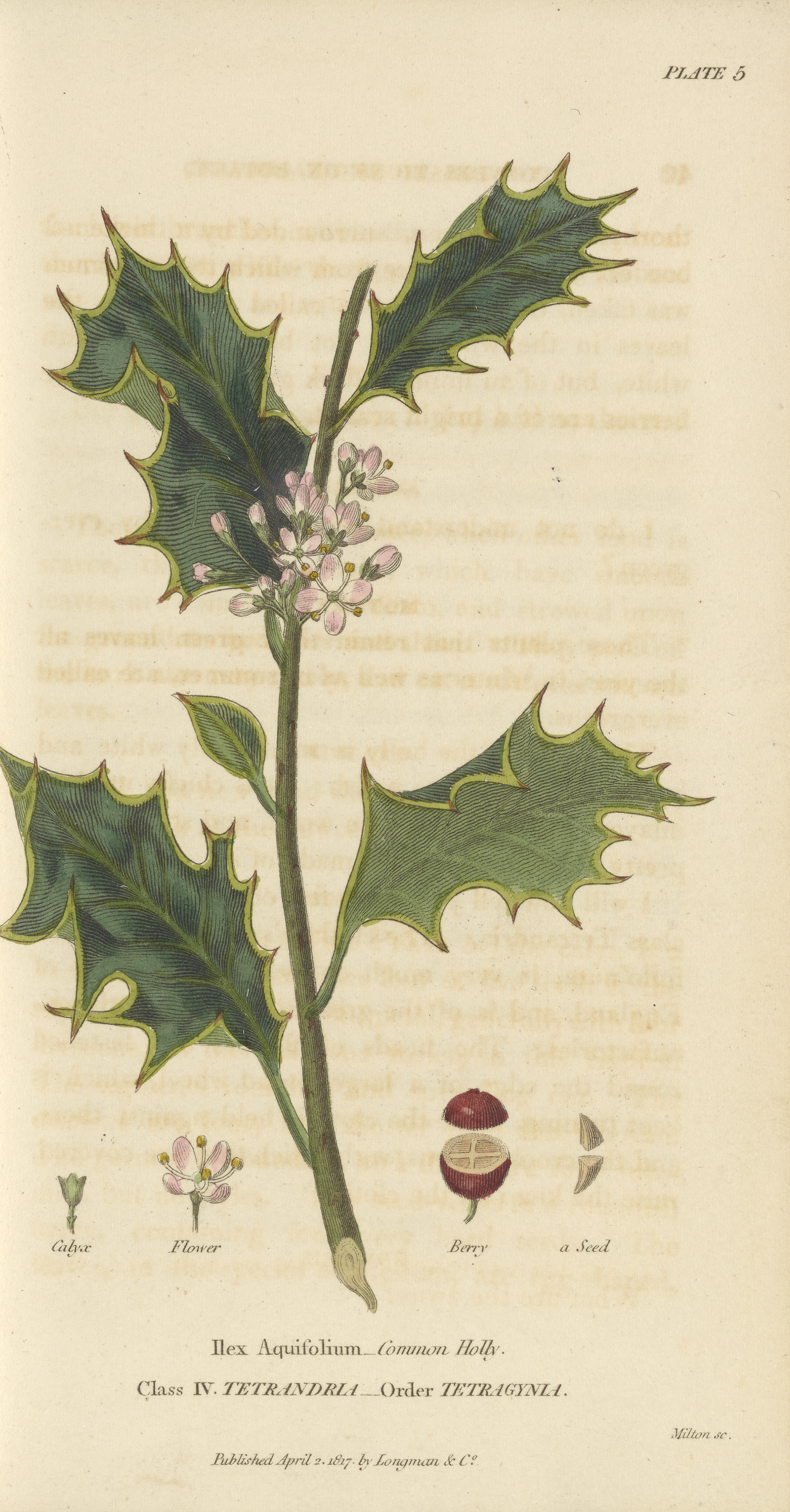
Ilex aquifolium

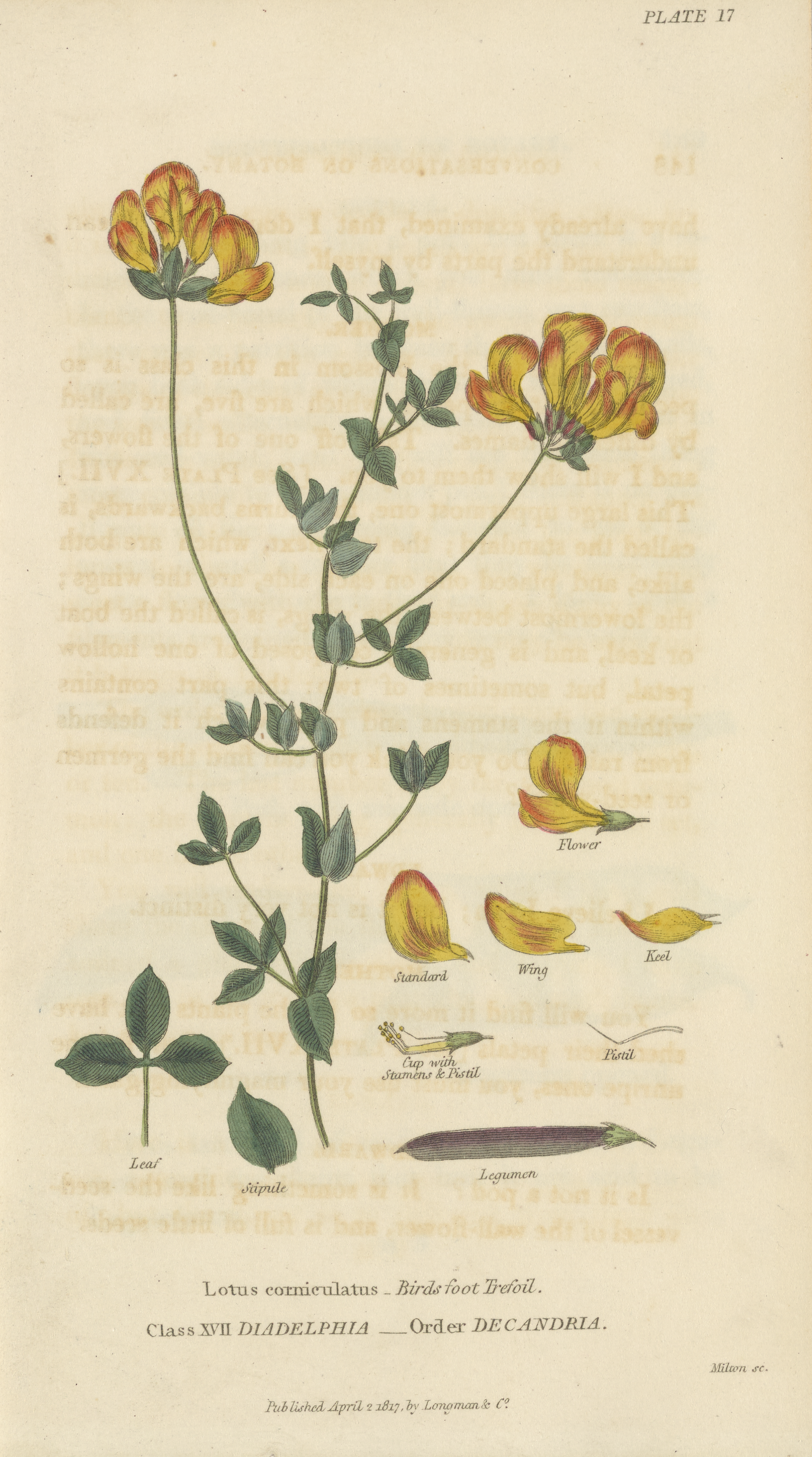
Lotus corniculatus

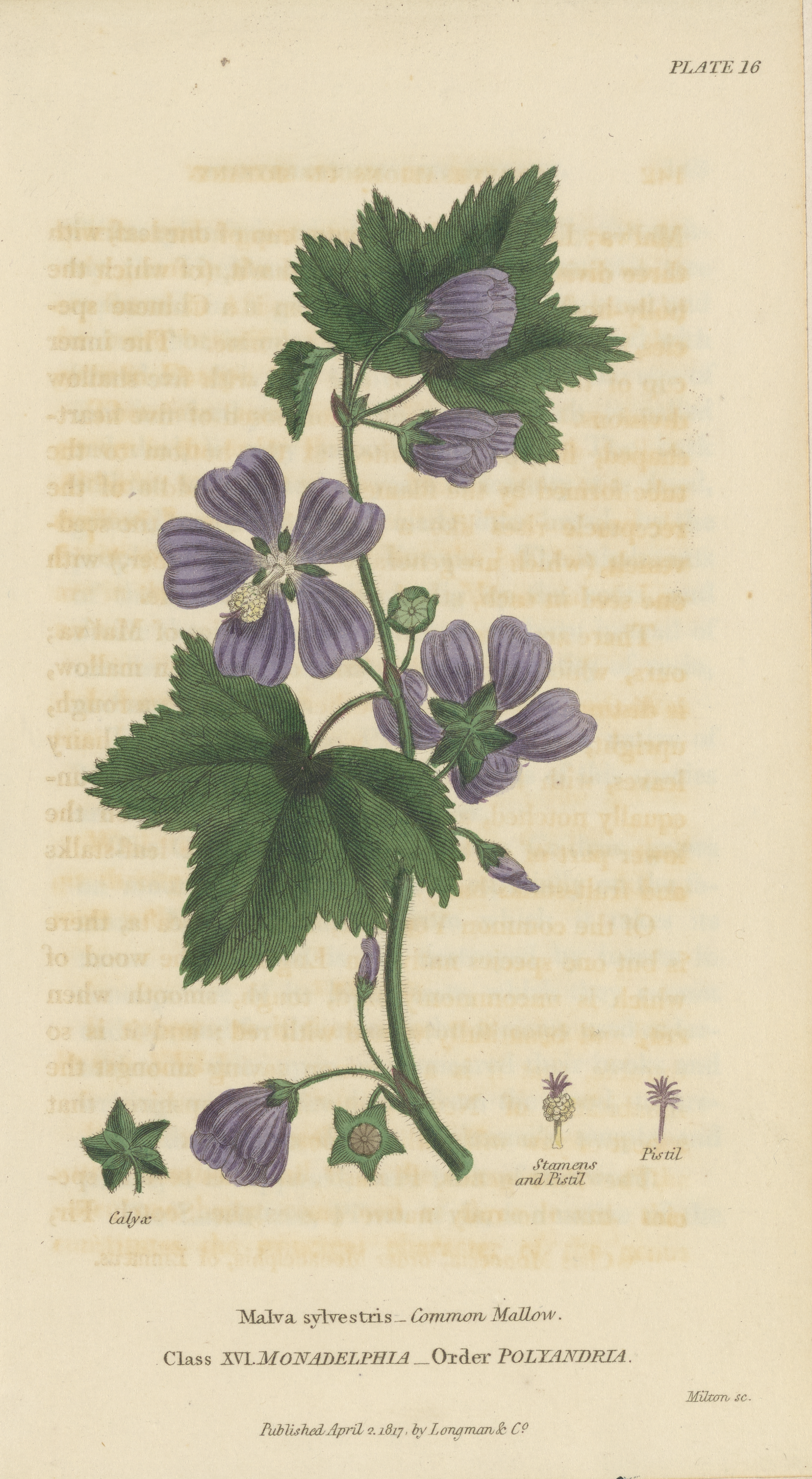
Malva sylvestris

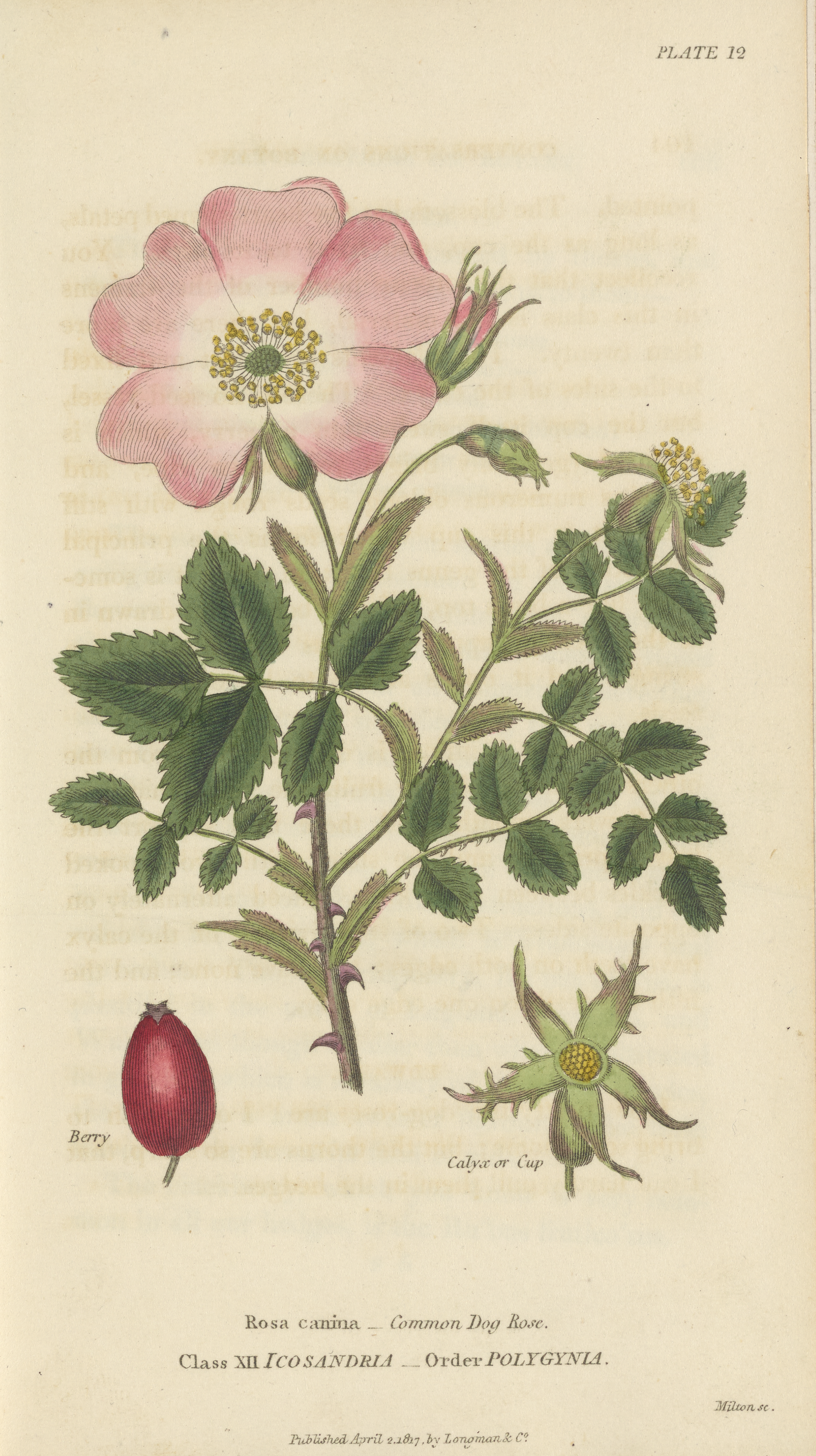
Rosa canina

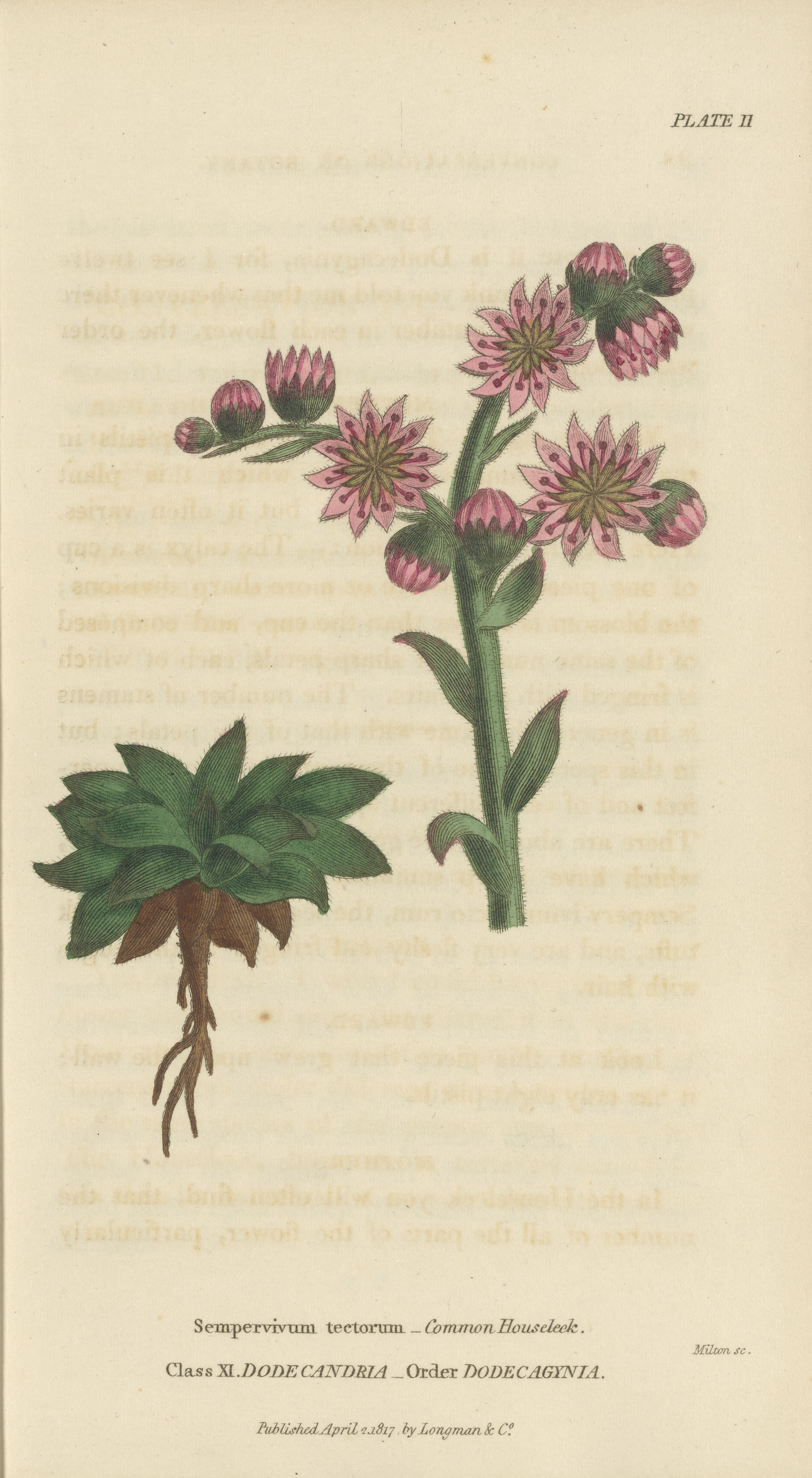
Sempervivum tectorum

The first and second editions of the book were illustrated with plates marked "Milton sc", indicating that they were engraved by Thomas Milton. By the 1840 edition, however, the plates were marked "Sowerby sc", indicating the work of one of the Sowerby family.

Sarah Fitton's book The Four Seasons: A short account of the structure of plants (1865) draws on the content of Conversations, but was written for a very different audience, members of the Working Men's Institute in Paris.

The Belgian botanist Eugène Coemans named a genus of perennial flowering shrubs Fittonia in honour of the Fitton sisters in 1865. Then in 1913, botanist Gustav Lindau published Afrofittonia which is a genus of plants from Africa in the family Acanthaceae. It was named in the Fitton sisters honour and also the continent where it was found.

== Publications ==
- Fitton, Sarah Mary; Fitton, Elizabeth (1817). Conversations on Botany. London, England: Longman, Hurst, Rees, Orme, and Brown.. For 1817 plates by Thomas Milton, see Digital Collections at Science History Institute (High-resolution scans of title page and 20 hand-colored plates from the 1817 printing).
- Fitton, Sarah Mary (1855). Conversations on Harmony. London, England: Longman, Brown, Green, and Longmans.
- Little By Little, A Series Of Graduated Lessons In The Art Of Reading Music (1863)
- Four Seasons: a Short Account of the Structure of Plants (1865)
