= William Henry Fitton =

British geologist (1780–1861)

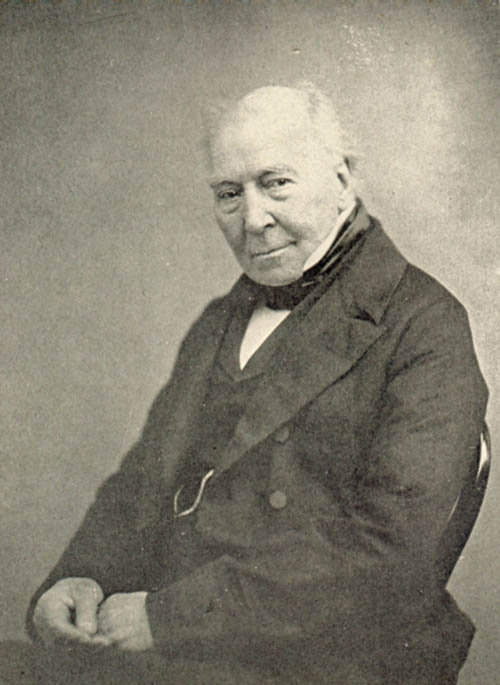
William Henry Fitton in 1860

William Henry Fitton (24 January 1780 – 13 May 1861) was an Irish medical doctor and amateur geologist.

== Biography ==
Fitton was born in Dublin and educated at Trinity College in that city. He gained the senior scholarship in 1798, and graduated in the following year. At this time he began to take an interest in geology and to form a collection of fossils. Having adopted the medical profession, he proceeded in 1808 to Edinburgh, where he attended the lectures of Robert Jameson, and thenceforth his interest in natural history and especially in geology steadily increased. He moved to London in 1809, where he studied medicine and chemistry. In 1811 he presented to the Geological Society of London a description of the geological structure of the vicinity of Dublin, with an account of some rare minerals found in Ireland. He took a medical practice at Northampton in 1812, and for some years the duties of his profession engrossed his time. He was admitted M.D. at Cambridge in 1816.

In 1820, having married a lady of means, Fitton settled in London, and devoted himself to geology. His Observations on some of the Strata between the Chalk and the Oxford Oolite, in the South-east of England (Trans. Geol. Soc. ser. 2, vol. iv.) embodied a series of researches extending from 1824 to 1836, and form the memoir known as Fitton's Strata below the Chalk. In this work he established the true succession and relations of the Upper and Lower Greensand, and of the Wealden and Purbeck formations, and elaborated their detailed structure. He had been elected fellow of the Royal Society in 1815, and he was president of the Geological Society of London in 1827–1829, and to which he contributed a number of research publications. His house then became a meeting place for scientific workers, and during his presidency he held a conversazione open on Sunday evenings to all fellows of the Geological Society. From 1817 to 1841 he contributed to the Edinburgh Review many essays on the progress of geological science, and reviews of the groundbreaking books of William Smith (geologist), Charles Lyell, and Roderick Murchison; he also wrote Notes on the Progress of Geology in England for the Philosophical Magazine (1832–1833). Another publication of note was A Geological Sketch of the Vicinity of Hastings (1833). He was awarded the Wollaston Medal by the Geological Society in 1852. This medal is now in the collection of the Geological Museum, Trinity College, Dublin. Around 1825, according to Charles Babbage's autobiography, he invented the thaumatrope, which was later commercially publicised by Dr. John Ayrton Paris (to whom the invention is more usually attributed). He died in London.

== Family ==
Fitton had three sisters, Sarah Mary, Elizabeth (fl. 1817–1834) and Susanna. Sarah and Elizabeth wrote Conversations on Botany, which influenced the popularity of botany as a field of scientific study for women.
