= Luigi Mayer =

Italian painter

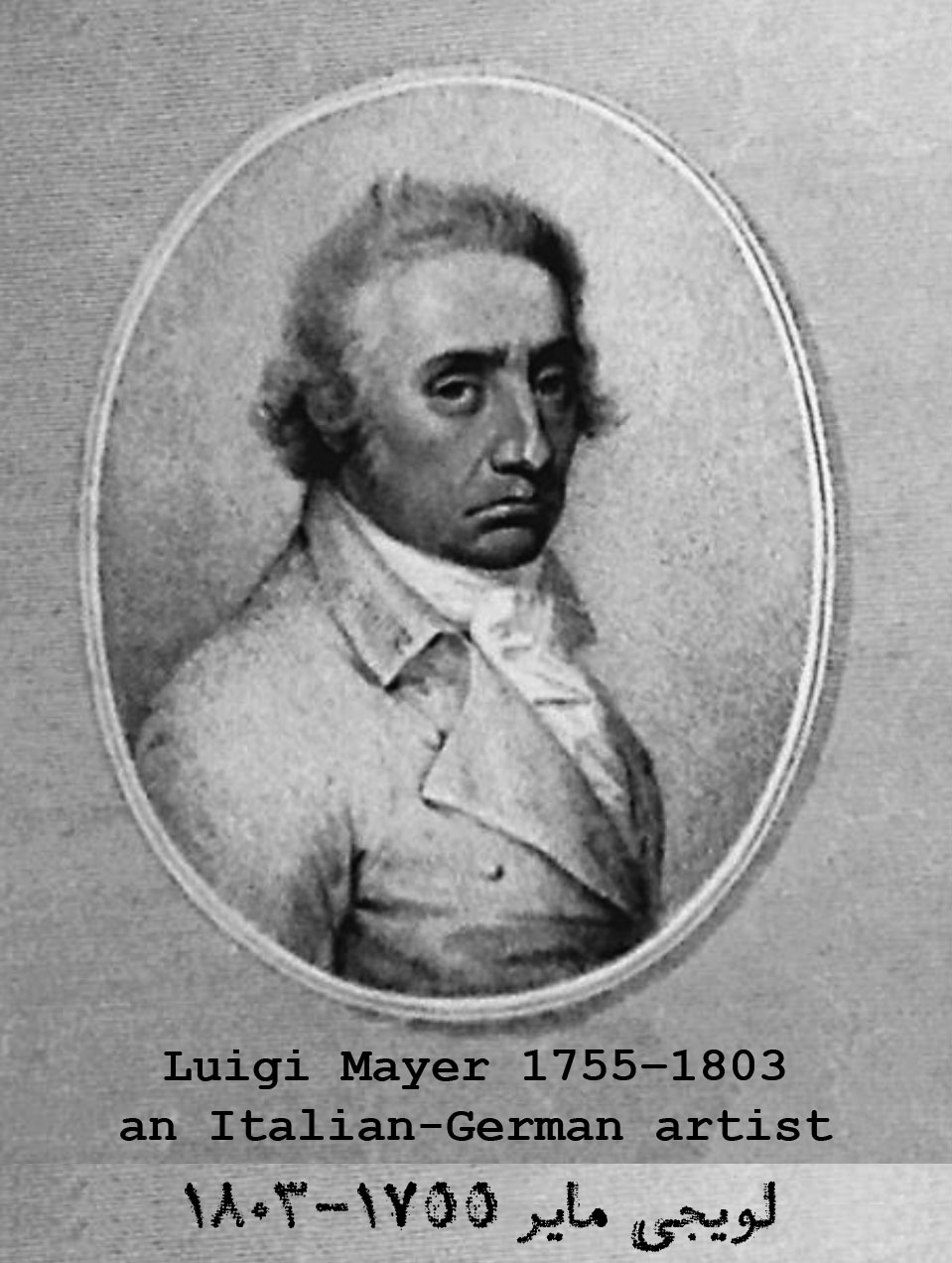
- Luigi Mayer
- Born: 1 March 1755; Italy
- Died: 1 January 1803 (aged 47); London
- Known for: Painter
- Movement: Orientalist

Luigi Mayer (1755–1803) was an Italian-German artist and one of the earliest and most important late 18th-century European painters of the Ottoman Empire.

== Life ==
Mayer was a close friend of Sir Robert Ainslie, 1st Baronet, a British ambassador to the Ottoman Empire between 1776 and 1792, and the bulk of his paintings and drawings during this period were commissioned by Ainslie. He travelled extensively through the Ottoman Empire between 1776 and 1794, and became well known for his sketches and paintings of panoramic landscapes of ancient sites from the Balkans to the Greek Islands, Anatolia and Egypt, particularly ancient monuments and the Nile. Many of the works were amassed in Ainslie's collection, which was later presented to the British Museum, providing a valuable insight into the Middle East of that period. His wife, Clara Barthold Mayer, worked as his assistant and produced her own paintings.

== Works ==
Views in Turkey in Europe and Asia (from 1801), by Sir Robert Ainslie, was a multi-volume work based on Mayer's drawings. There were plates engraved by William Watts. Thomas Milton was involved, producing aquatints of Egyptian views.

- Mayer, L. (1803). Views in the Ottoman empire, chiefly in Caramania, a part of Asia Minor hitherto unexplored; with some curious selections from the islands of Rhodes and Cyprus, and the celebrated cities of Corinth, Carthage, and Tripoli; from the original drawings in the possession of Sir R. Ainslie, taken during his embassy to Constantinople, by Luigi Mayer; with historical observations and incidental illustrations of the manners and customs of the natives of the country. London: R. Bowyer.
- Mayer, L. (1804). Views in Palestine, from the original drawings of Luigi Mayer : with an historical and descriptive account of the country, and its remarkable places. London: Printed by T. Bensley for R. Bowyer.
- Mayer, L. (1810). Views in the Ottoman dominions : in Europe, in Asia, and some of the Mediterranean islands. London: Printed by T. Bensley, Bolt Court, Fleet Street, for R. Bowyer, 80, Pall Mall.

== Gallery ==
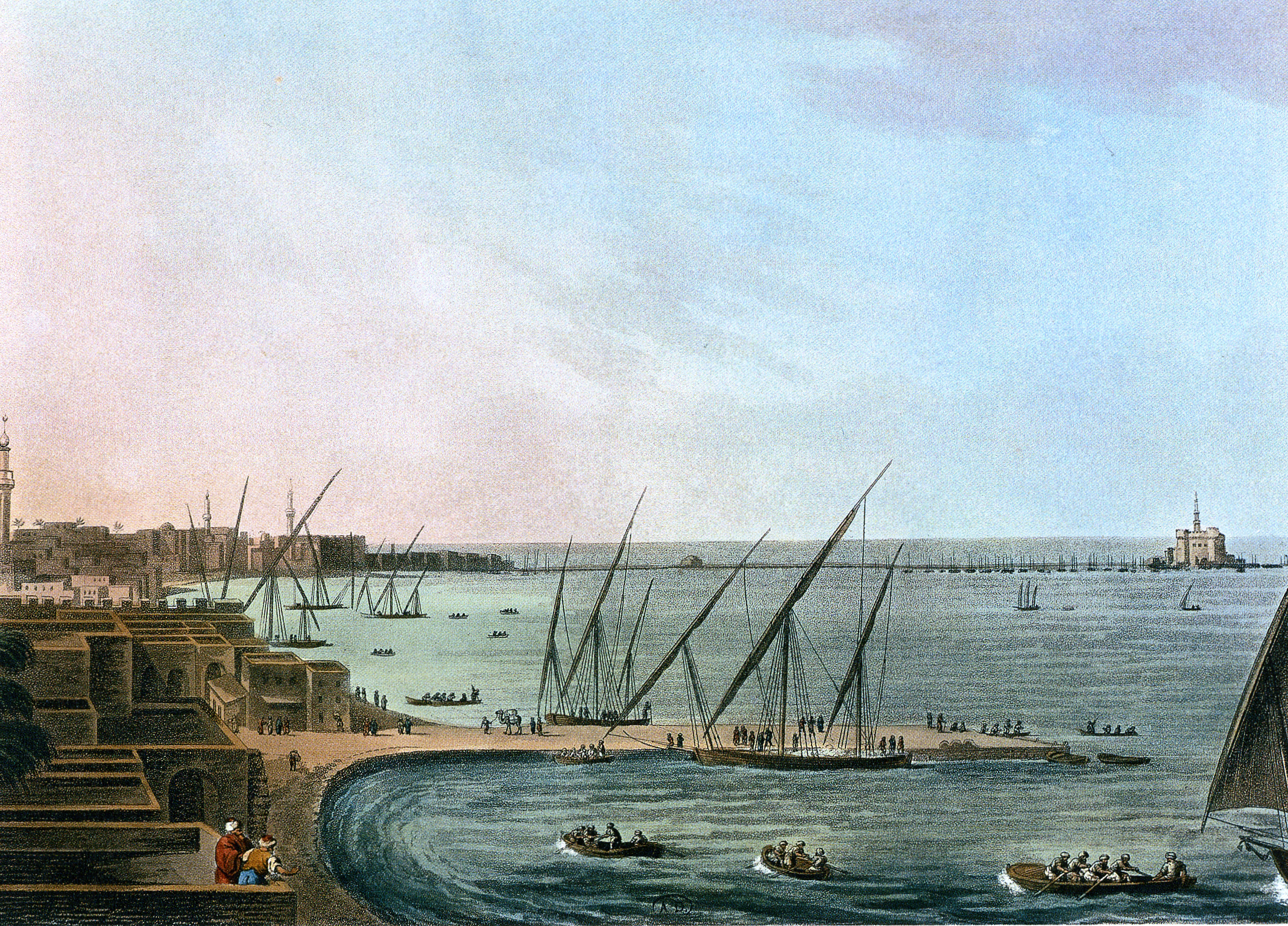
Alexandria Lighthouse

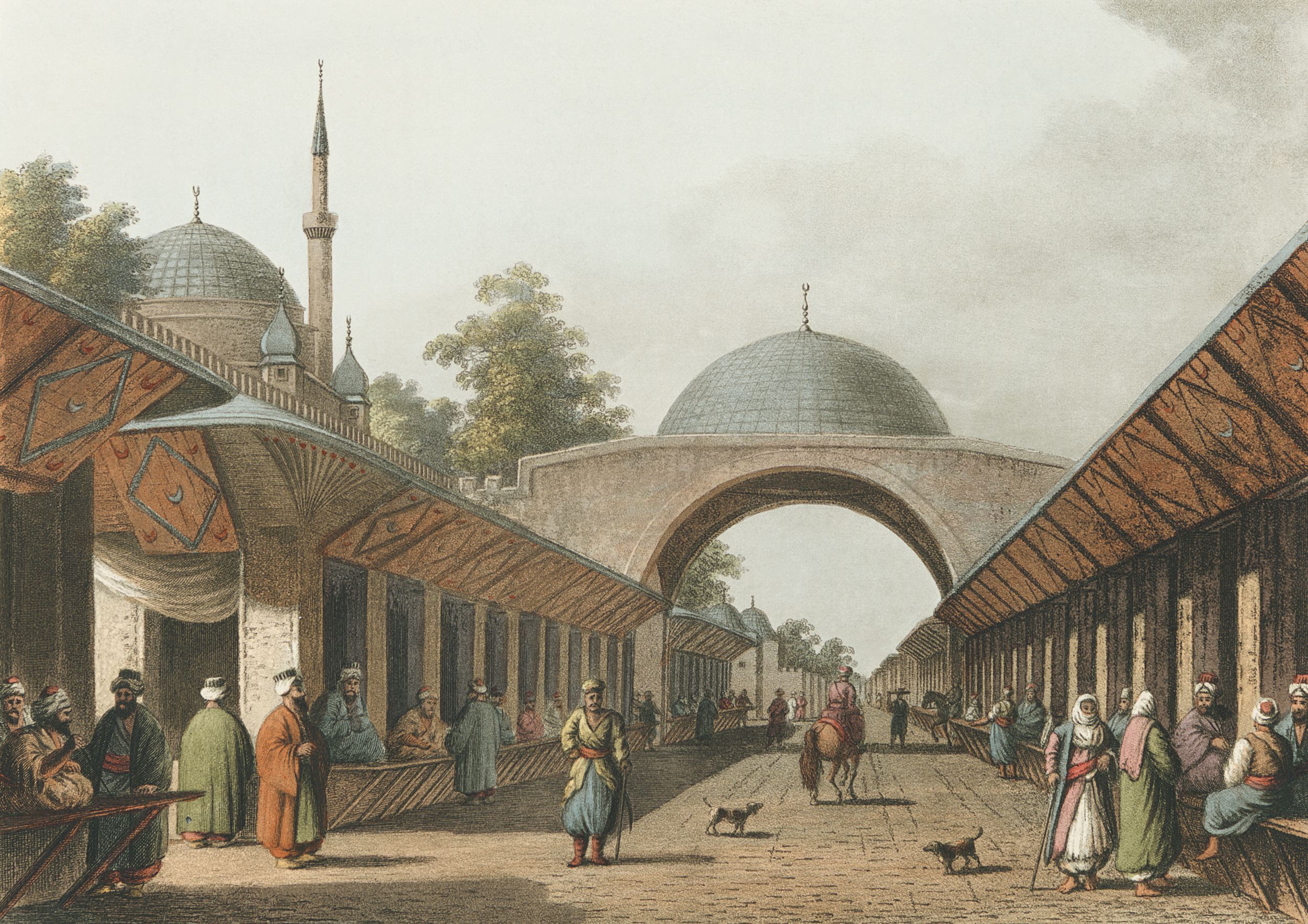
Burgas in Ottoman Bulgaria

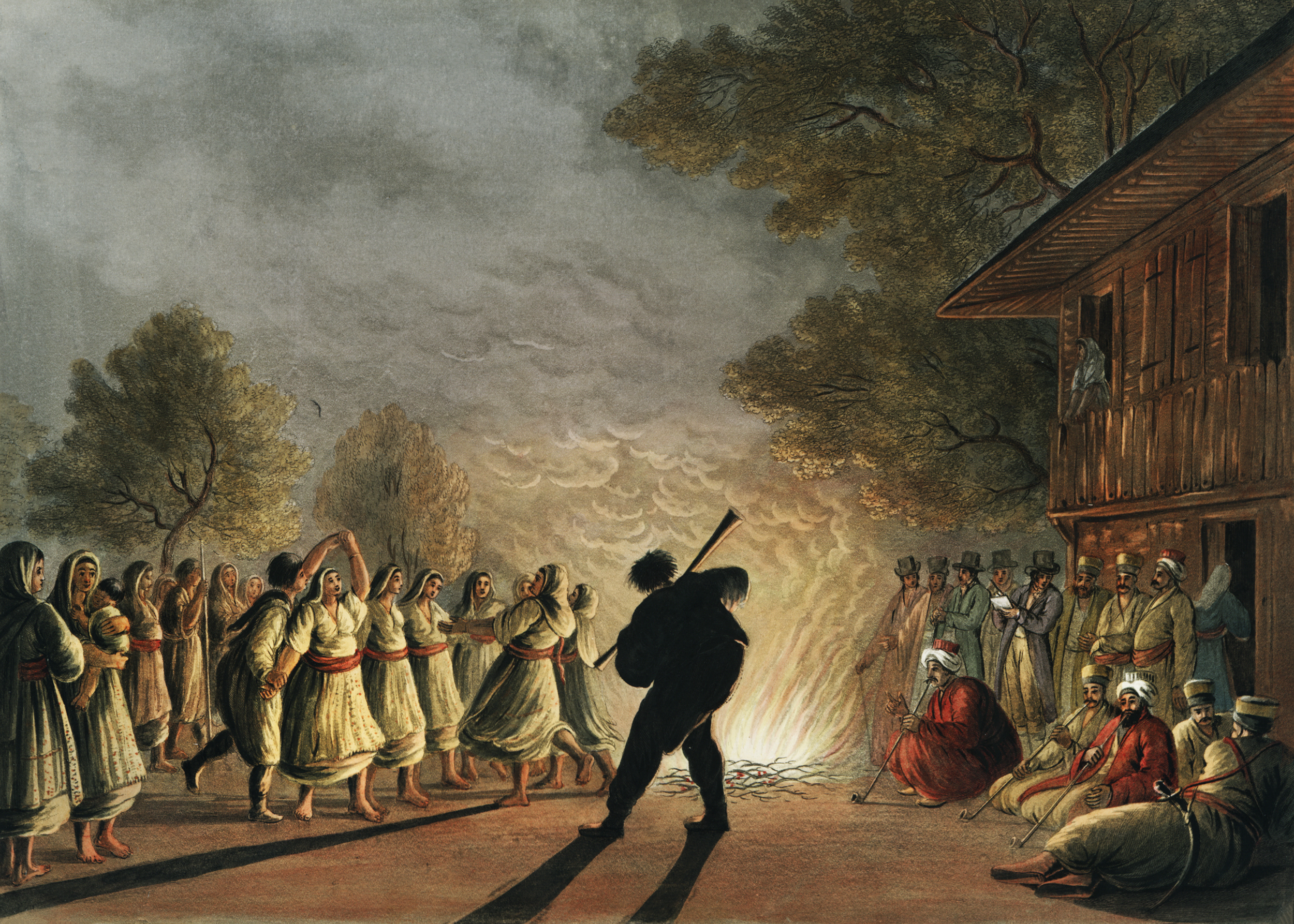
Dance of Bulgarian peasants

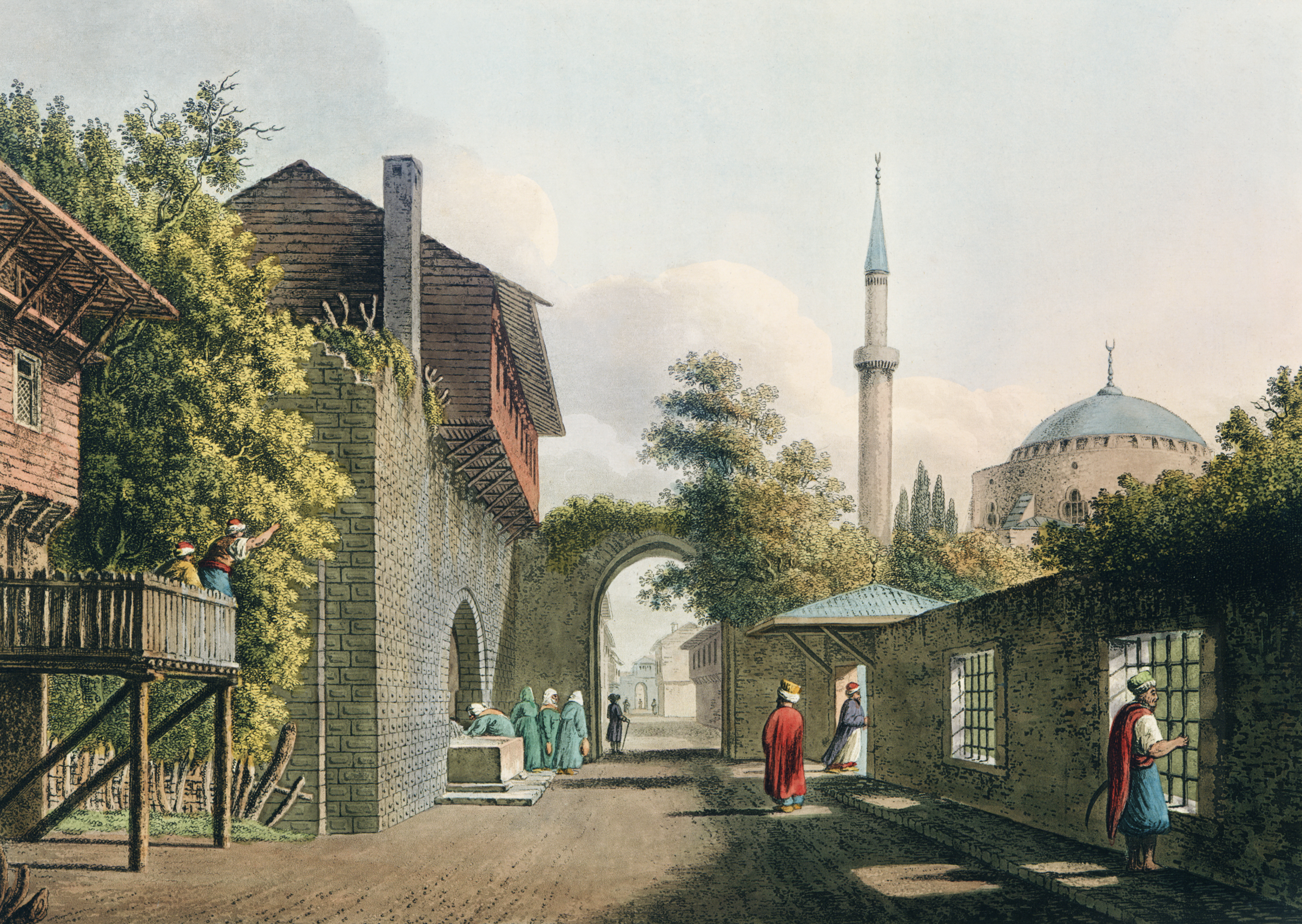
Istanbul

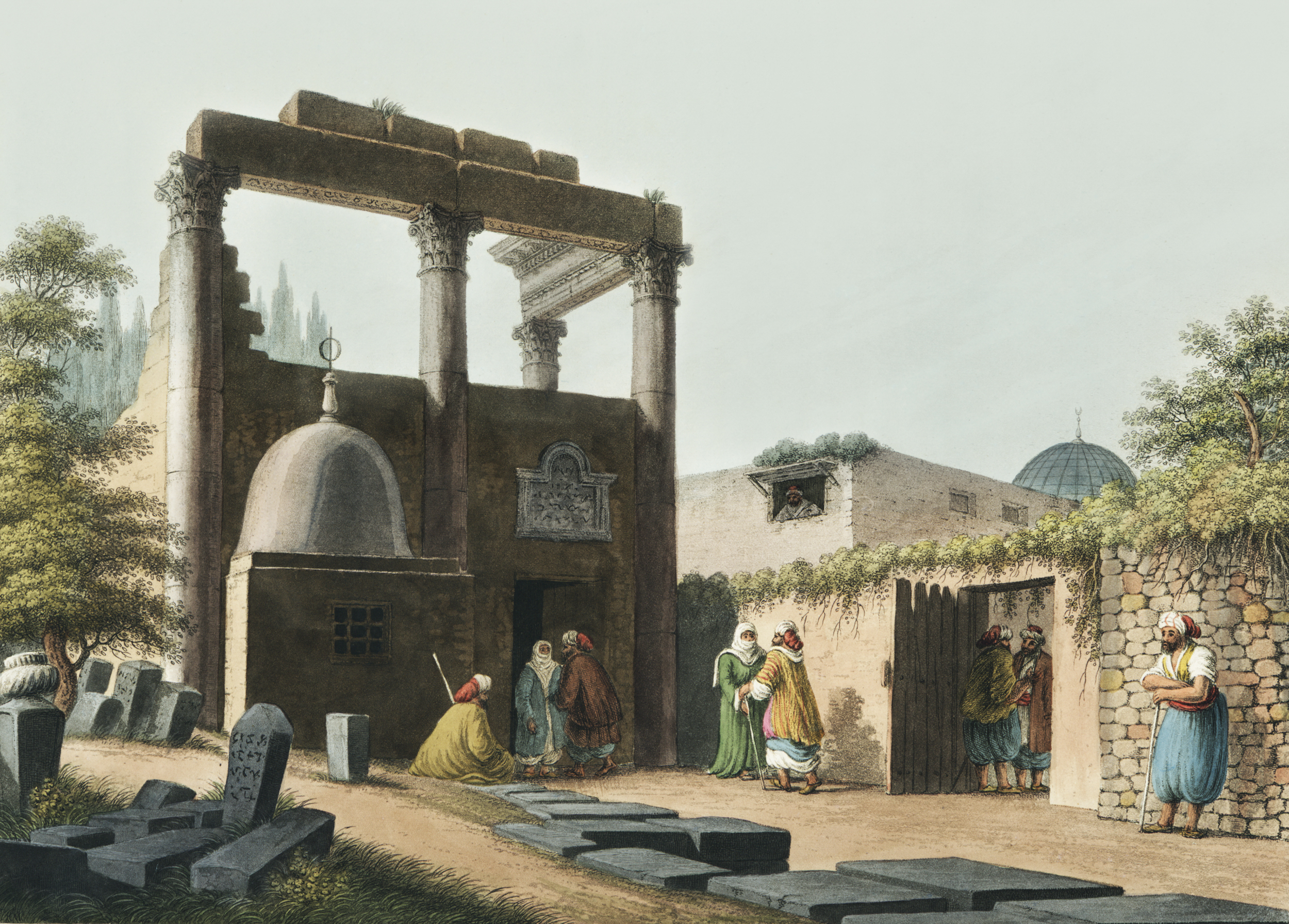
Latakia, Syria

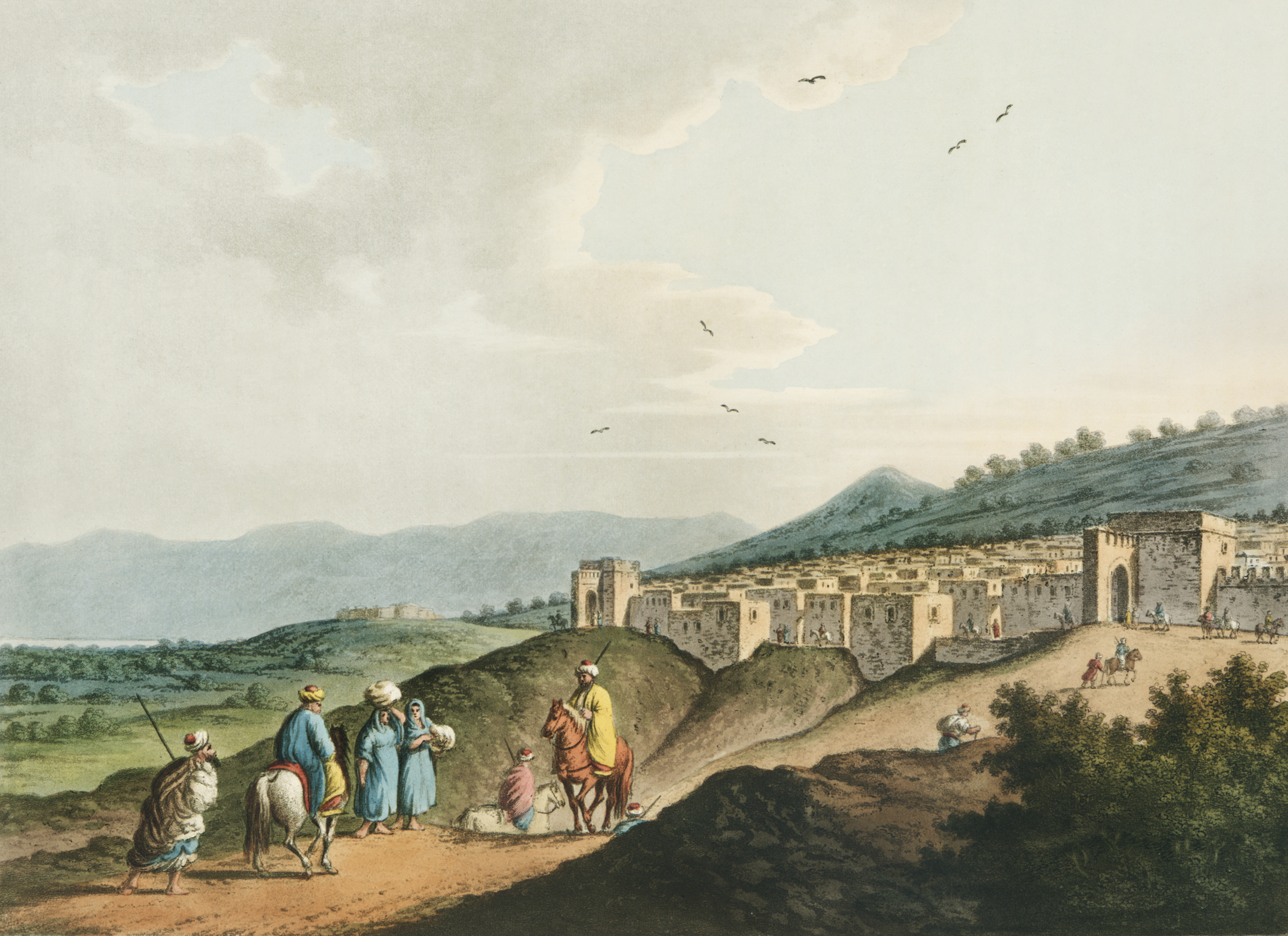
Bethlehem

== See also ==
- List of Orientalist artists
- Orientalism
