= William Bond (engraver) =

British engraver

- Known for: Engraving

William Bond (fl. 1772 – 1827) was a British engraver.

== Biography ==
Bond studied stipple engraving under Francesco Bartolozzi, with his first work being published in 1772. He was considered one of the best stipple engravers of the late 18th-century, along the likes of Richard Earlom, John Ogborne and Charles Turner. He was nominated to be the first president of the Society of Engravers in 1802/03.

== Gallery ==
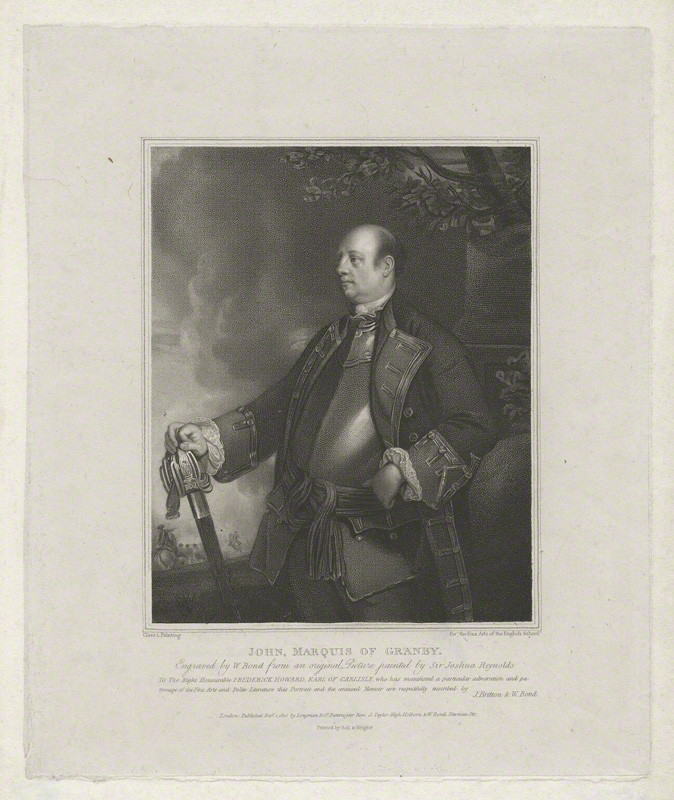

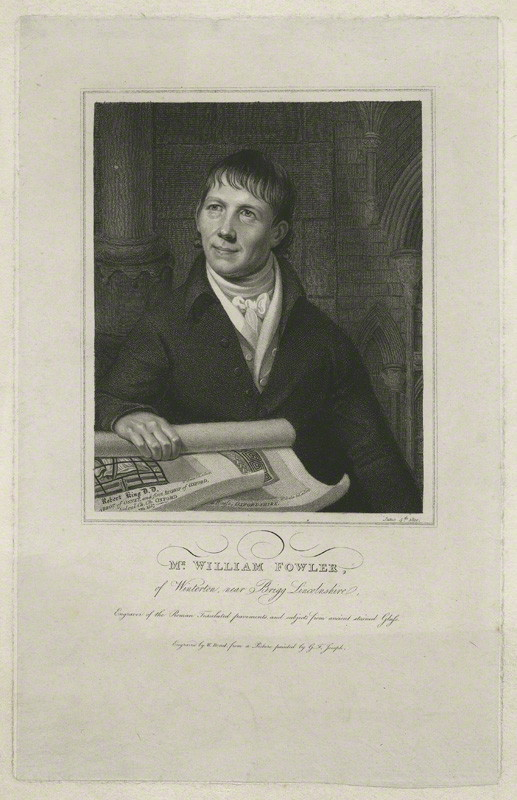

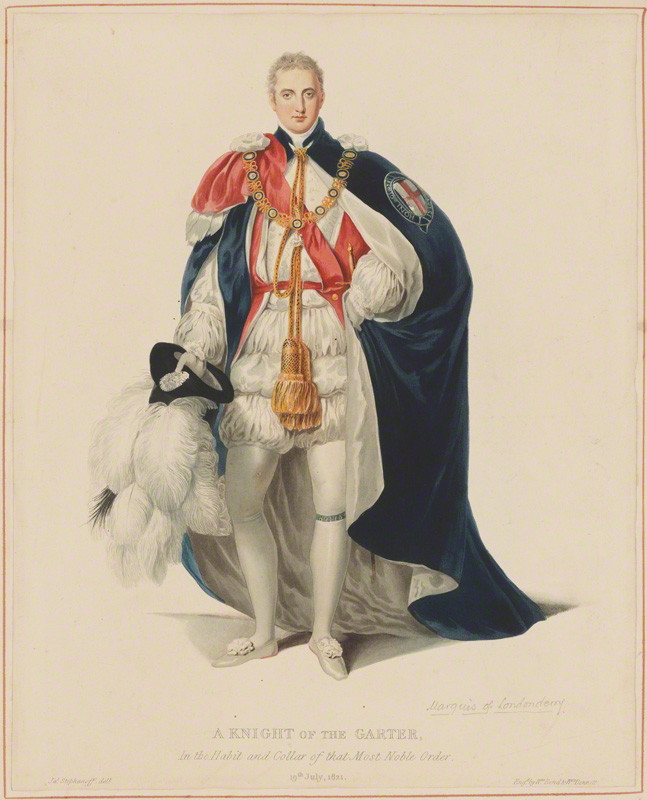

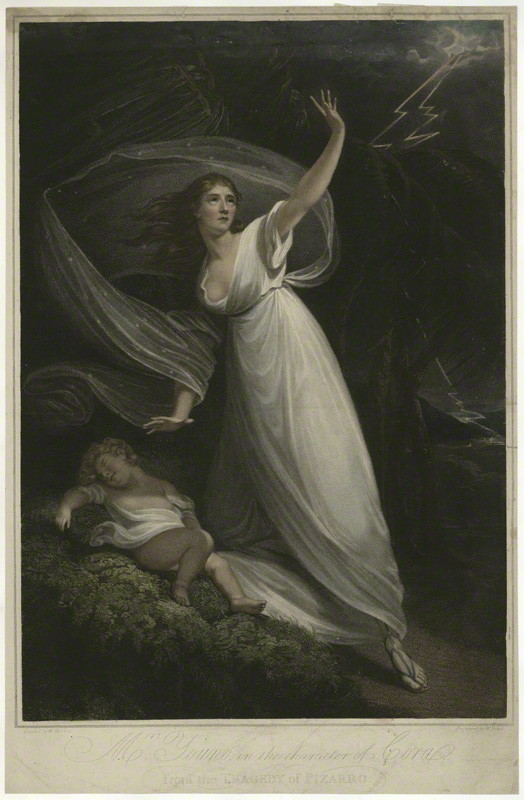

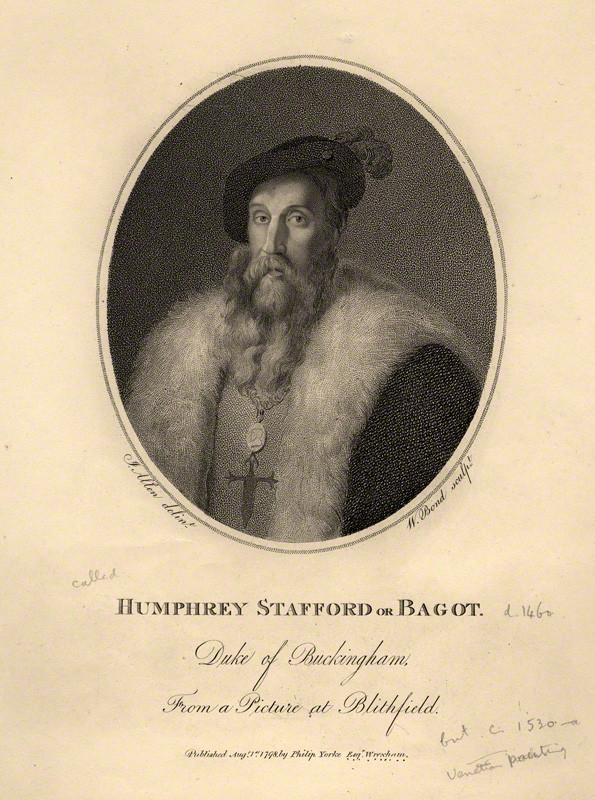
