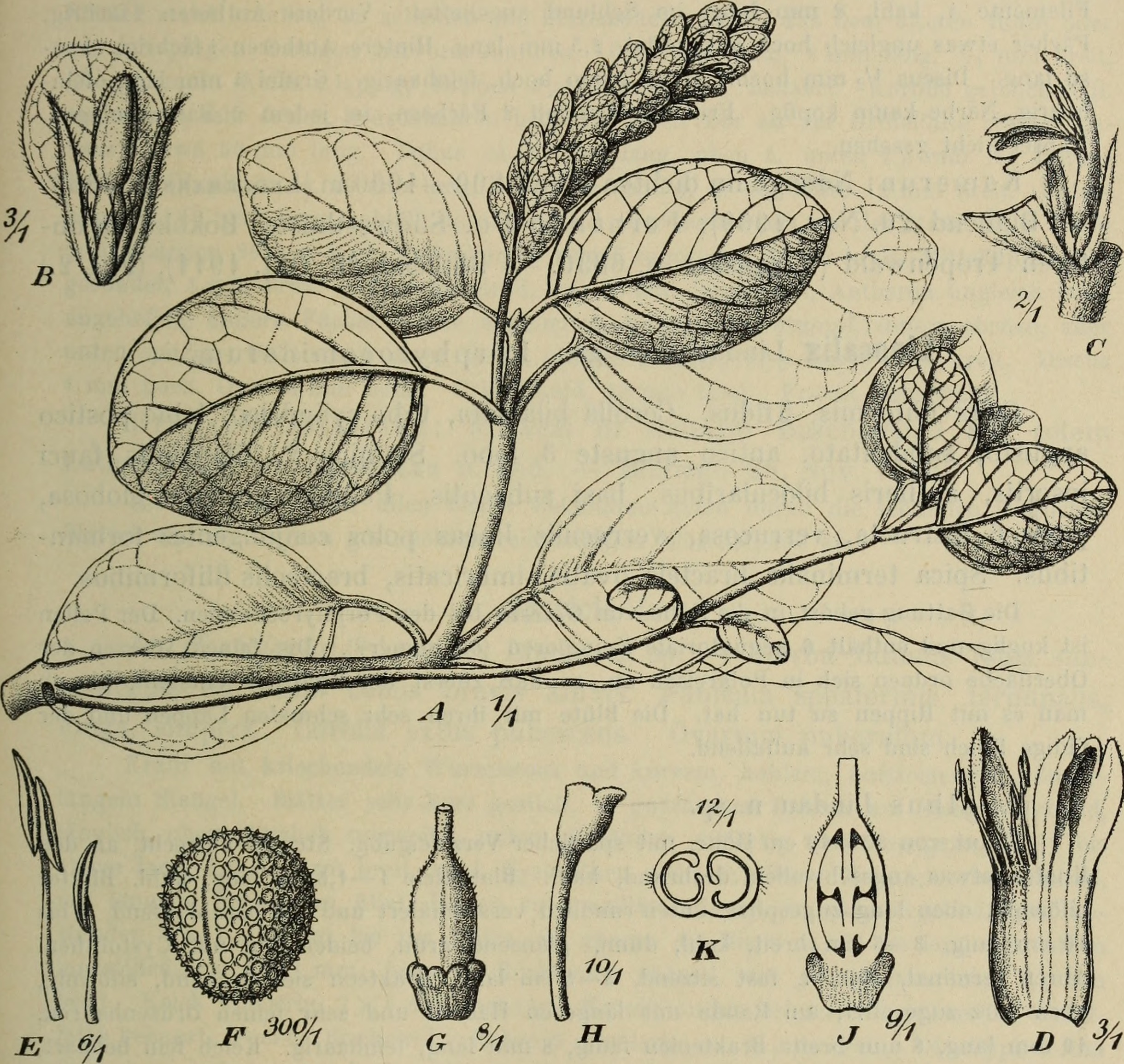
- Illustrations of Afrofittonia silvestris

Conservation status
- Vulnerable (IUCN 3.1)

Scientific classification
- Kingdom: Plantae
- Clade: Tracheophytes
- Clade: Angiosperms
- Clade: Eudicots
- Clade: Asterids
- Order: Lamiales
- Family: Acanthaceae
- Subfamily: Acanthoideae
- Tribe: Justicieae
- Genus: Afrofittonia; Lindau
- Species: A. silvestris

Binomial name
- Afrofittonia silvestris Lindau

Synonyms
- Talbotia S.Moore

= Afrofittonia =

Genus of flowering plants

Afrofittonia commonly known as the hunter's weed, is a genus of plants in the family Acanthaceae. There is only one species in the genus, Afrofittonia silvestris. It is found in Cameroon, Equatorial Guinea, and Nigeria. Its natural habitat is subtropical or tropical moist lowland forests. It is threatened by habitat loss due to Oil & gas drilling.

The genus name of Afrofittonia is in honour of Sarah Mary Fitton (c.1796–1874), an Irish writer and botanist and her sister Elizabeth Fitton. The Latin specific epithet of silvestris means woodland, from sylva. It was first described and published in Bot. Jahrb. Syst. Vol.49 on page 406 in 1913.

The genus is recognized by the United States Department of Agriculture and the Agricultural Research Service, but they do not list any known species.
