= Society of Engravers =

Early 19th-century British printmaking organization

The Society of Engravers was founded in London in 1802 to promote British printmaking, largely because engravers were not allowed (unless they were also painters or sculptors) to join the Royal Academy, and also to enable "each individual to act with more firmness in opposing the pretensions ... of booksellers and publishers". The first President was Francesco Bartolozzi, himself in fact an R.A.. The Royal Watercolour Society (as it later became) was founded in 1804 for similar reasons. The society is described as "short-lived".

Later Presidents included William Bond, and James Parker, James Pastorini and Thomas Milton were Governors.

== See also ==
- Royal Society of Painter-Etchers and Engravers founded 1880
