= John William Edy =

English painter

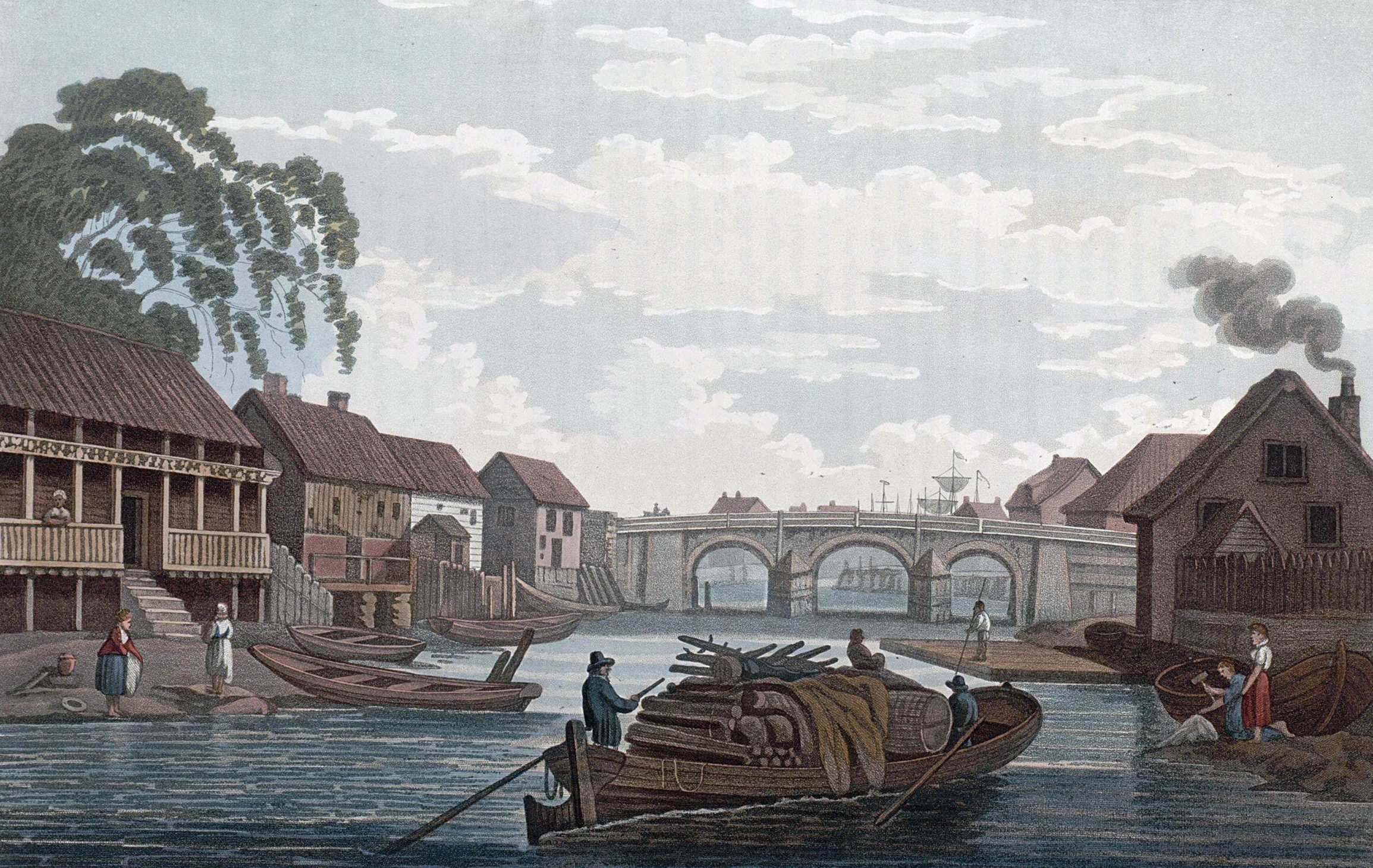
Bridge at Vaterland in Christiania (Oslo), Norway, by John William Edy

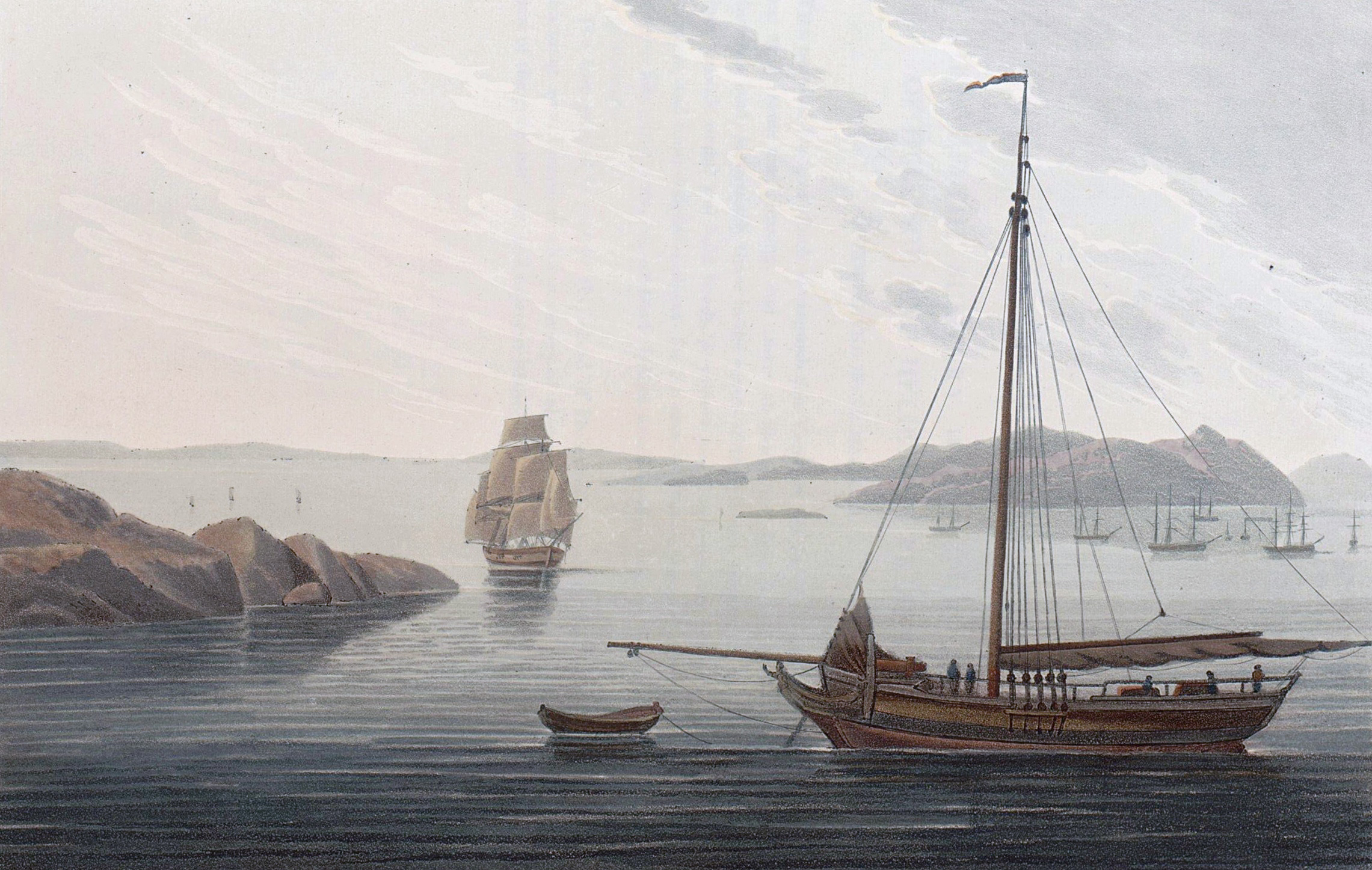
Ny-Hellesund anno 1800, picturesque scenery of Norway

John William Edy (1760 – 1820) was an English painter. He worked for the publisher John Boydell in London, often anonymously. In the summer of 1800 Edy visited Norway on an assignment for Boydell together with the landscape painter William Fearnside. They were in Norway from July 31 and until the end of September the same year.

Edy made numerous drawings from the trip, among them drawings of Ny-Hellesund which was the place the two artists arrived at in Norway. In Norway he is also known for his drawings of Christiania and Moss. Boydells Picturesque Scenerey of Norway was published in London in 1820.
