= Thomas Milton =

British engraver (1743–1827)

Thomas Milton (1743 – 27 February 1827) was a British engraver.

He was a son of John Milton (fl. 1770), the marine painter, and was descended from a brother of the poet John Milton. From the character of his plates it seems probable that Milton was a pupil of William Woollett, and he is said to have practised for some time in London, but nothing is known of the work of his early life. He was living in Dublin in 1783, but had returned to London by 1786.

Milton was a governor of the short-lived Society of Engravers founded in 1803. He died at Bristol on 27 February 1827.

== Works ==
In 1783 appeared the first number of his Views of Seats in Ireland, a series of twenty-four plates from drawings by William Ashford, John James Barralet, Francis Wheatley, and others; this work, which made Milton's reputation, was completed in 1793. From then on he seems to have relied on commissions from publishers.

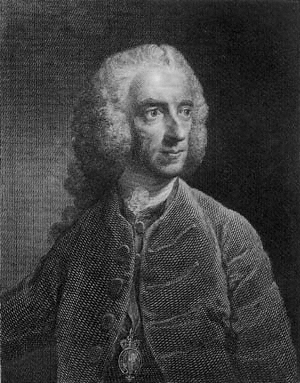
Stephen Leake, 1803 engraving.

His other major plate was The Deluge, engraved for Thomas Macklin's Bible from a picture by Philip James de Loutherbourg. His work occurs also in John Boydell's, George Kearsley's, and George Steevens's editions of Shakespeare, and William Young Ottley's Stafford Gallery 1818. In 1801 appeared Views in Egypt, a series of coloured aquatints; the subtitle clarifies that it was from original drawings in owned by Sir Robert Ainslie, taken during his embassy to Constantinople by Luigi Mayer, engraved by and under Milton.

For Rees's Cyclopædia he engraved well over 200 plates, mostly on natural history topics.
