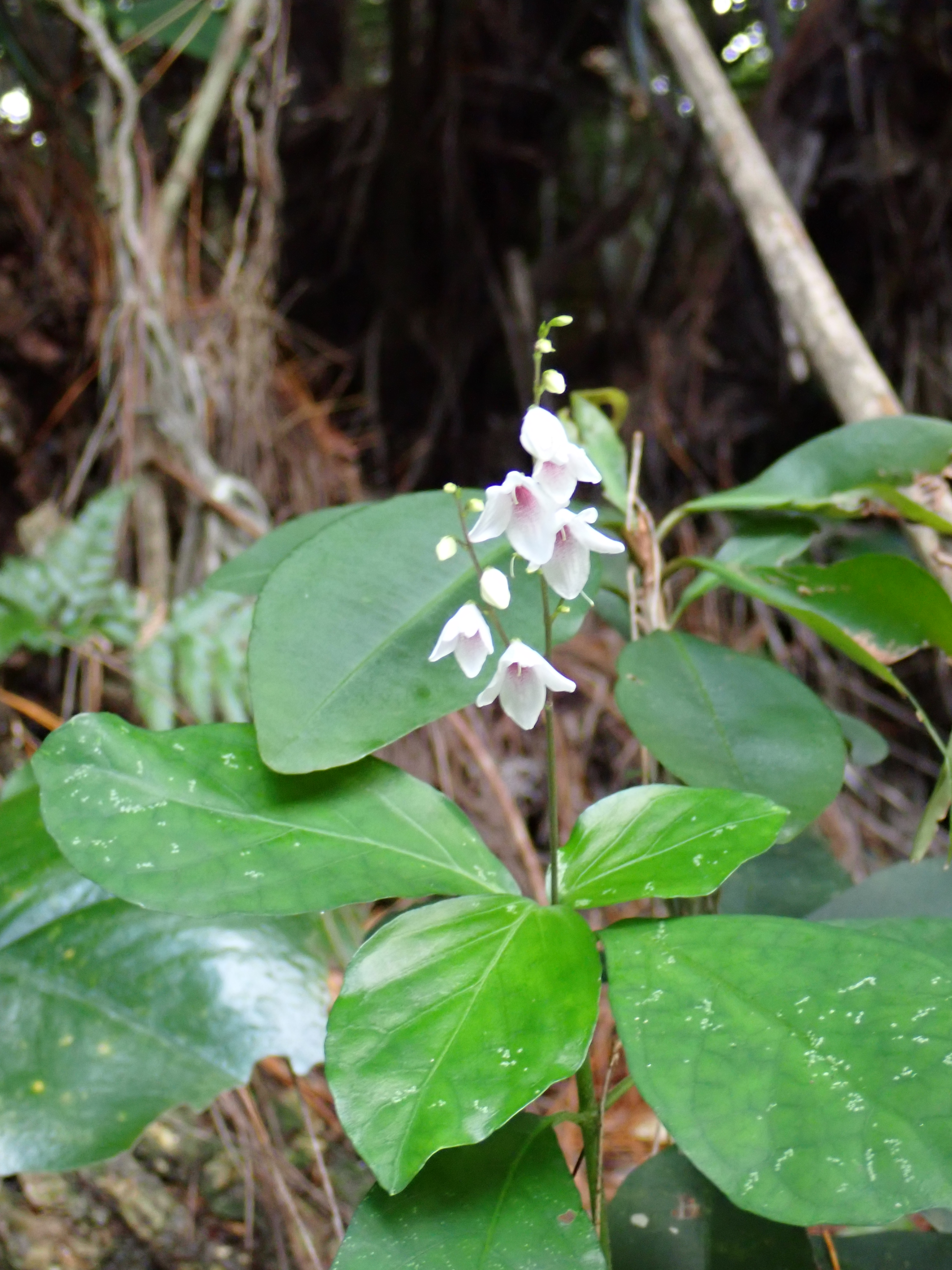

Scientific classification
- Kingdom: Plantae
- Clade: Embryophytes
- Clade: Tracheophytes
- Clade: Spermatophytes
- Clade: Angiosperms
- Clade: Eudicots
- Clade: Asterids
- Order: Lamiales
- Family: Acanthaceae
- Genus: Codonacanthus
- Species: C. pauciflorus

Binomial name
- Codonacanthus pauciflorus (Nees) Nees

Synonyms
- Asystasia pauciflora Nees

= Codonacanthus pauciflorus =

Species of flowering plant

Codonacanthus pauciflorus is a species of perennial or subshrub of the plant family Acanthaceae. It occurs in mainland China, Hong Kong, Taiwan, Japan, and South and Southeast Asia.

== Description ==
This species is a perennial, erect herb growing 20–60 cm (7.9–23.6 in) tall with many branches and quadrangular, lightly hairy stems. The leaves are thin, elliptic to lanceolate (5–12 cm long) with smooth or slightly wavy margins, green above and paler beneath. The inflorescences are simple racemes or small terminal panicles (3–10 cm) with small, widely spaced flowers. The flowers have a white, bell-shaped corolla (8–10 mm long) and two included stamens. The fruit is an oblanceolate capsule about 1.5 cm long, containing 2–4 small, round seeds.

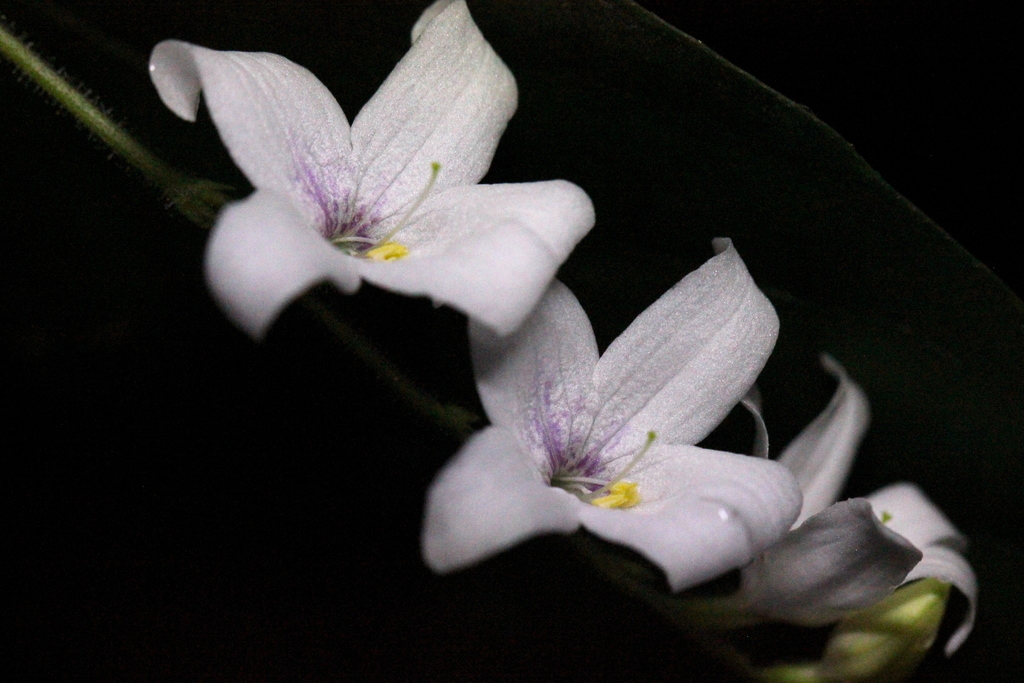

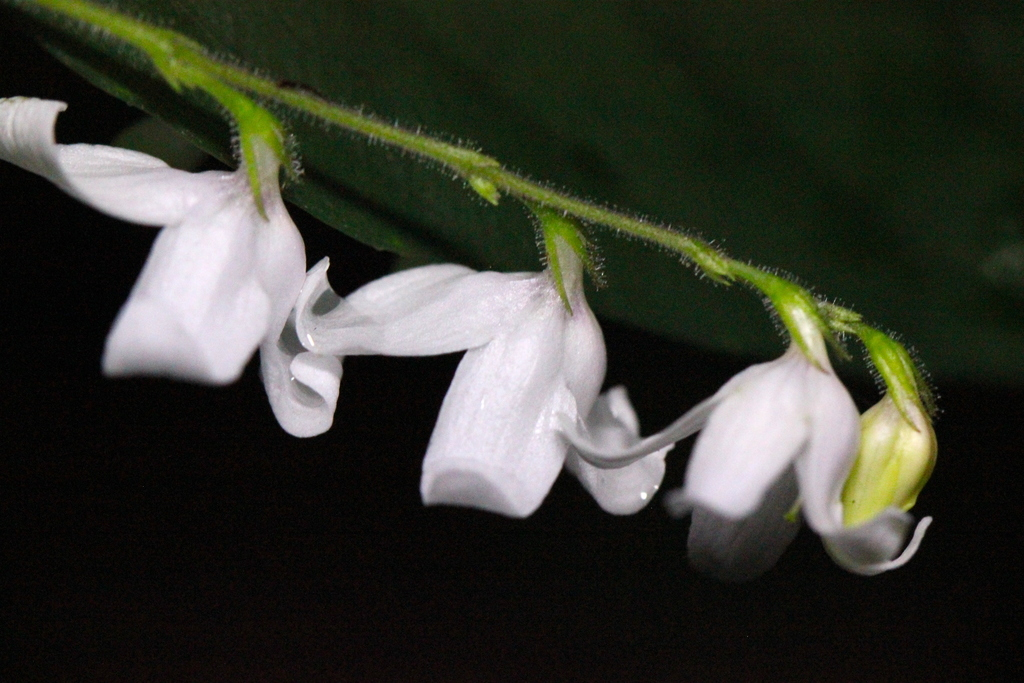

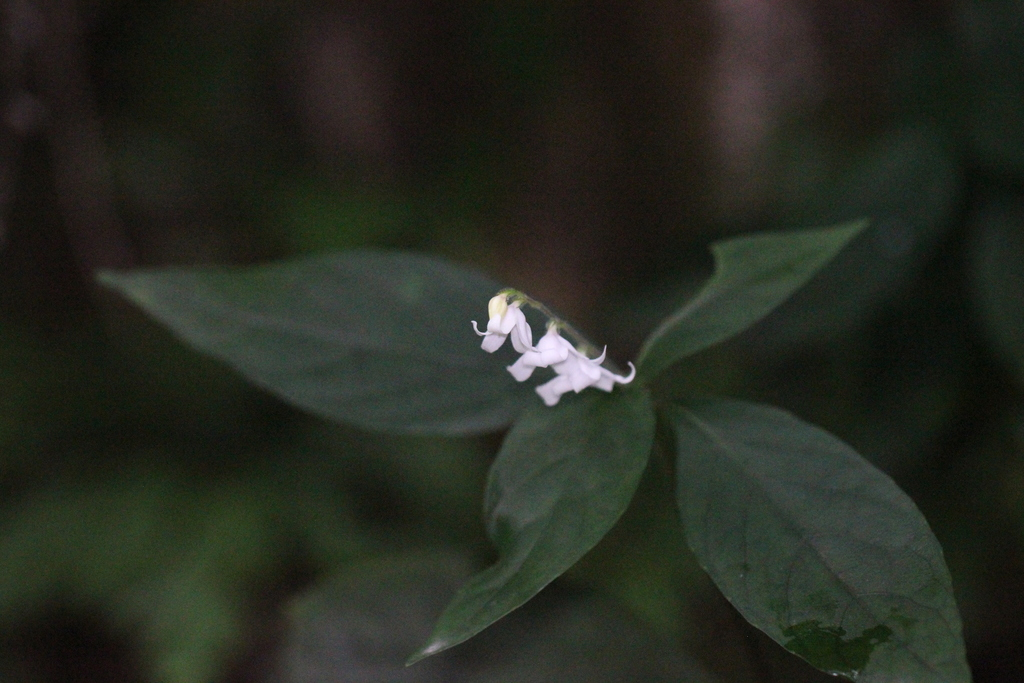

=== Life cycle ===
The species flowers and fruits from October to January.

== Distribution and habitats ==
It occurs in mainland China (Hainan, Guangdong, Guangxi, Guizhou, Yunnan, Fujian), Hong Kong, Taiwan, Japan, and South and Southeast Asia, including Bhutan, India, Laos, Myanmar, Vietnam, and Thailand. It grows mainly in subtropical regions, inhabiting forests and wet ravines.
