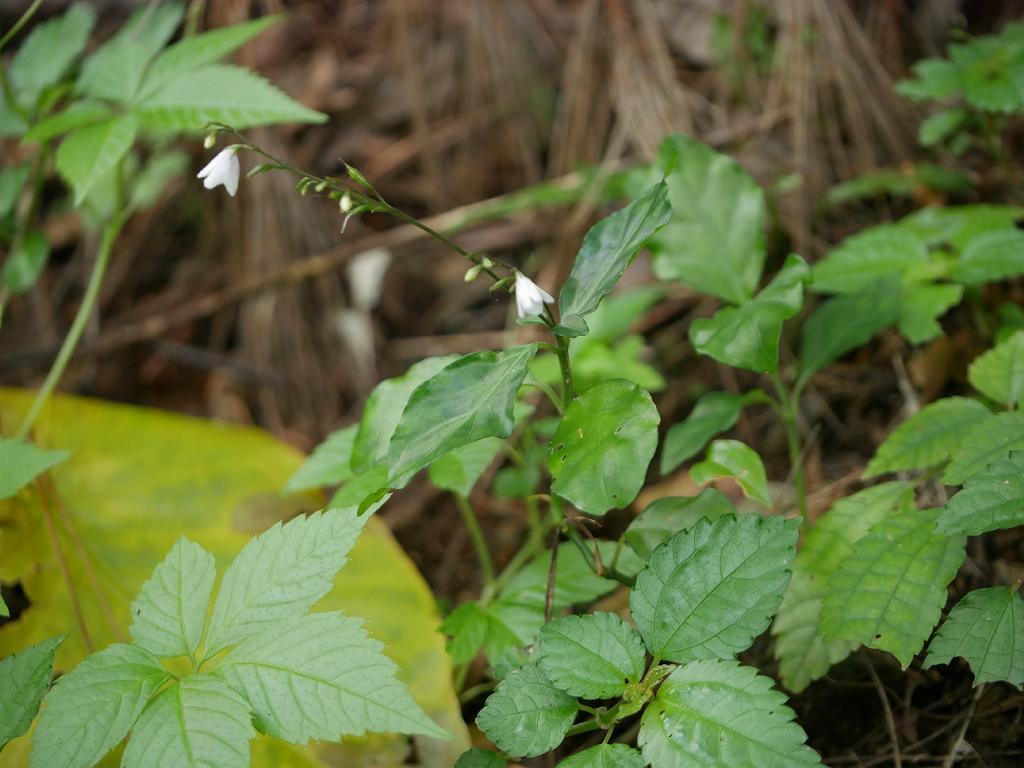
- C. pauciflorus in Okinawa Island, Japan

Scientific classification
- Kingdom: Plantae
- Clade: Embryophytes
- Clade: Tracheophytes
- Clade: Spermatophytes
- Clade: Angiosperms
- Clade: Eudicots
- Clade: Asterids
- Order: Lamiales
- Family: Acanthaceae
- Genus: Codonacanthus; Nees (1847)

= Codonacanthus =

Genus of flowering plants

Codonacanthus is a genus of flowering plants belonging to the family Acanthaceae.

Its native range is Assam through Indochina and southern China to Japan.

Species:

- Codonacanthus pauciflorus (Nees) Nees
- Codonacanthus sanjappae Karthig., Sumathi, Jayanthi & D.Naras.
- Codonacanthus spicatus Hand.-Mazz.
