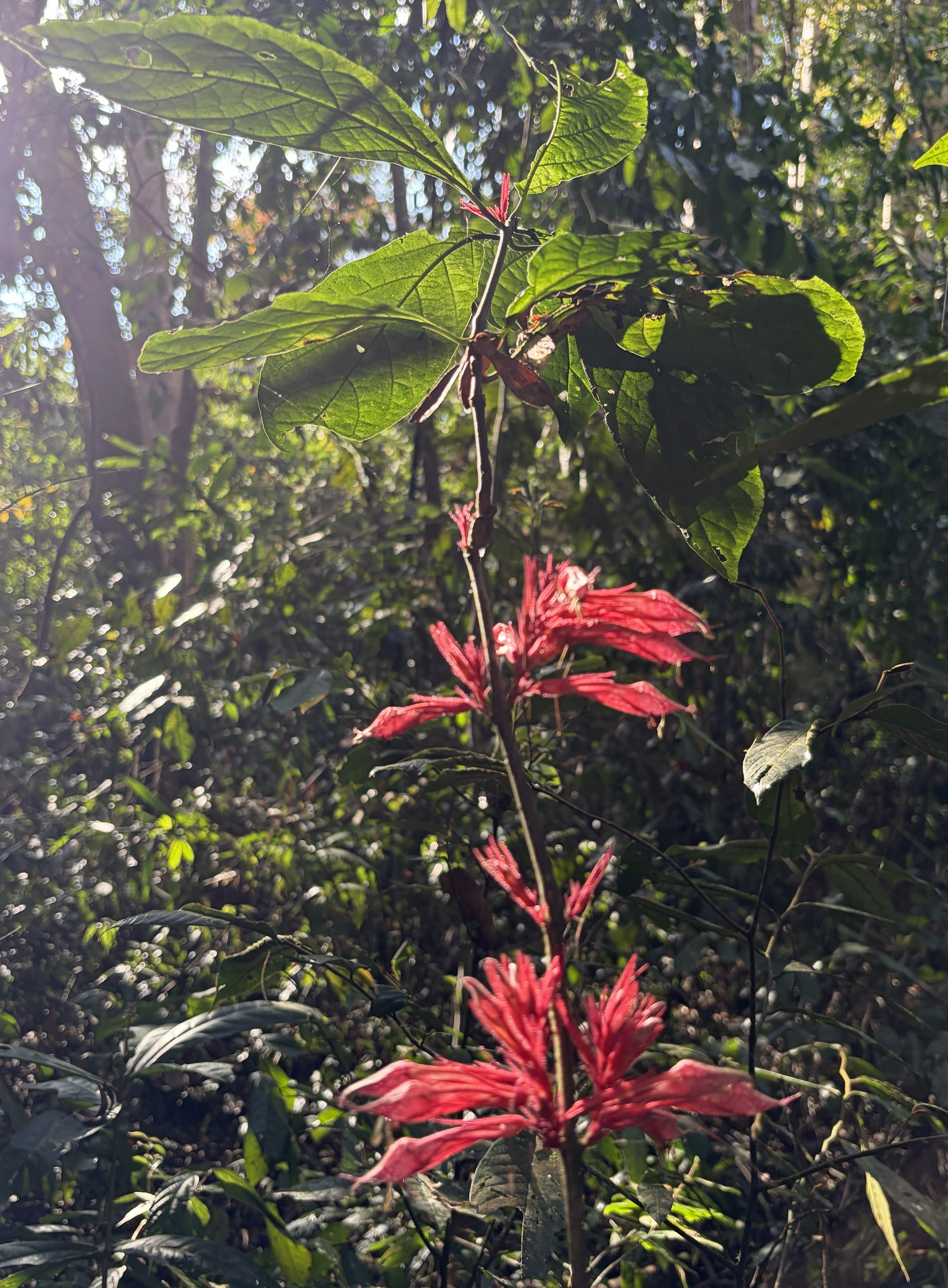

Scientific classification
- Kingdom: Plantae
- Clade: Embryophytes
- Clade: Tracheophytes
- Clade: Angiosperms
- Clade: Eudicots
- Clade: Asterids
- Order: Lamiales
- Family: Acanthaceae
- Subfamily: Acanthoideae
- Tribe: Justicieae
- Genus: Cyclacanthus; S.Moore (1921)

Type species
- Cyclacanthus coccineus

= Cyclacanthus =

Genus of flowering plants

Cyclacanthus is a genus of flowering plants in the family Acanthaceae and tribe Justicieae. The genus consists of two species endemic to Indochina, described by Spencer Le Marchant Moore in 1921.

== Species ==
- Cyclacanthus coccineus S.Moore
- Cyclacanthus poilanei Benoist (Vietnam: see external link)
