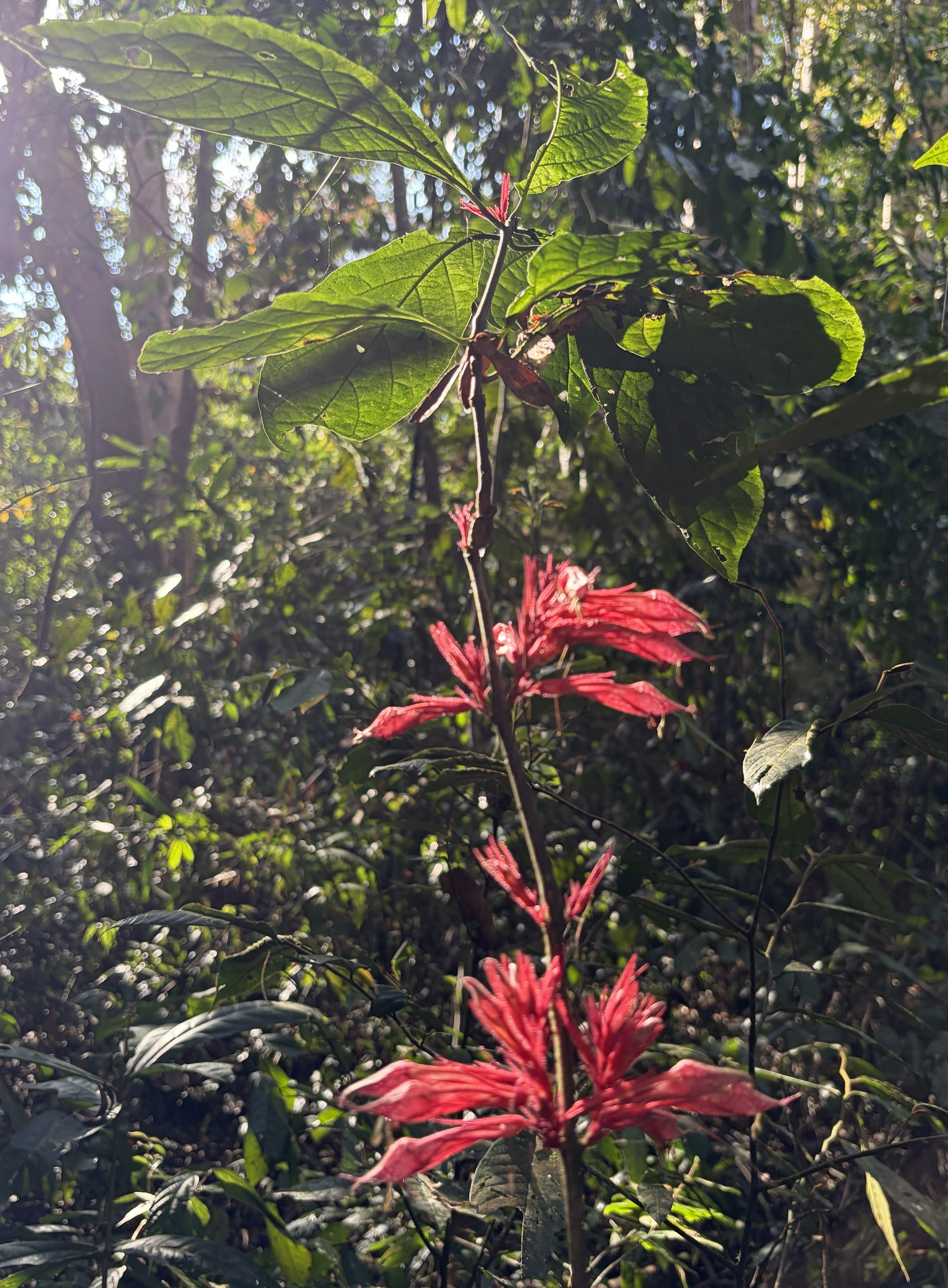

Scientific classification
- Kingdom: Plantae
- Clade: Embryophytes
- Clade: Tracheophytes
- Clade: Angiosperms
- Clade: Eudicots
- Clade: Asterids
- Order: Lamiales
- Family: Acanthaceae
- Genus: Cyclacanthus
- Species: C. coccineus

Binomial name
- Cyclacanthus coccineus S.Moore, 1921

= Cyclacanthus coccineus =

Species of flowering plant

Cyclacanthus coccineus is a type species in its genus of flowering plants and is included in the family Acanthaceae. The species found in Indo-China and was originally described by S.Moore in Thailand. In Vietnam it is found in southern provinces, between Khánh Hoà and Đồng Nai, where its name is luân rô đỏ.
