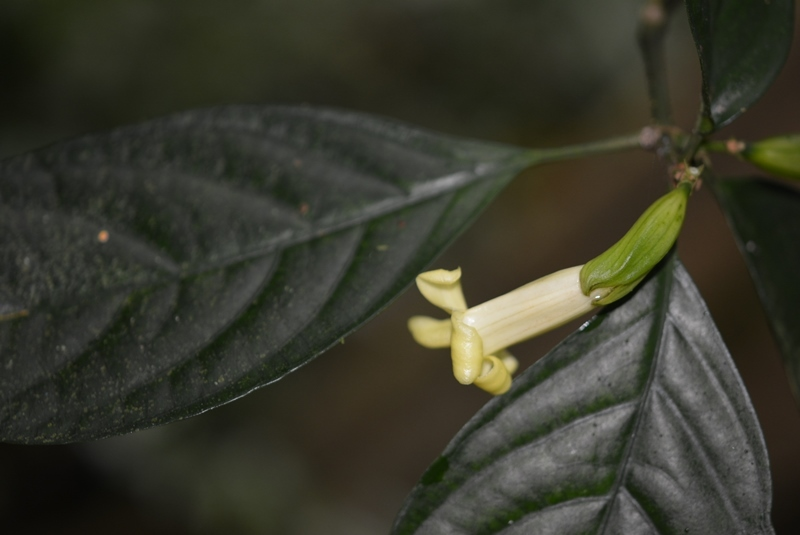
- In Mexico

Conservation status
- Least Concern (IUCN 3.1)

Scientific classification
- Kingdom: Plantae
- Clade: Tracheophytes
- Clade: Angiosperms
- Clade: Eudicots
- Clade: Asterids
- Order: Lamiales
- Family: Acanthaceae
- Genus: Spathacanthus
- Species: S. hahnianus

Binomial name
- Spathacanthus hahnianus Baill.

= Spathacanthus hahnianus =

Species of tree

Spathacanthus hahnianus is a species of plant in the family Acanthaceae. It is native to Guatemala, Honduras and Mexico. It is threatened by habitat loss. This species occurs in cloud forests and tropical rainforests, rarely in oak forests, and mostly around streams. It is found at elevations of 100–2,000 m (300–6,600 ft).
