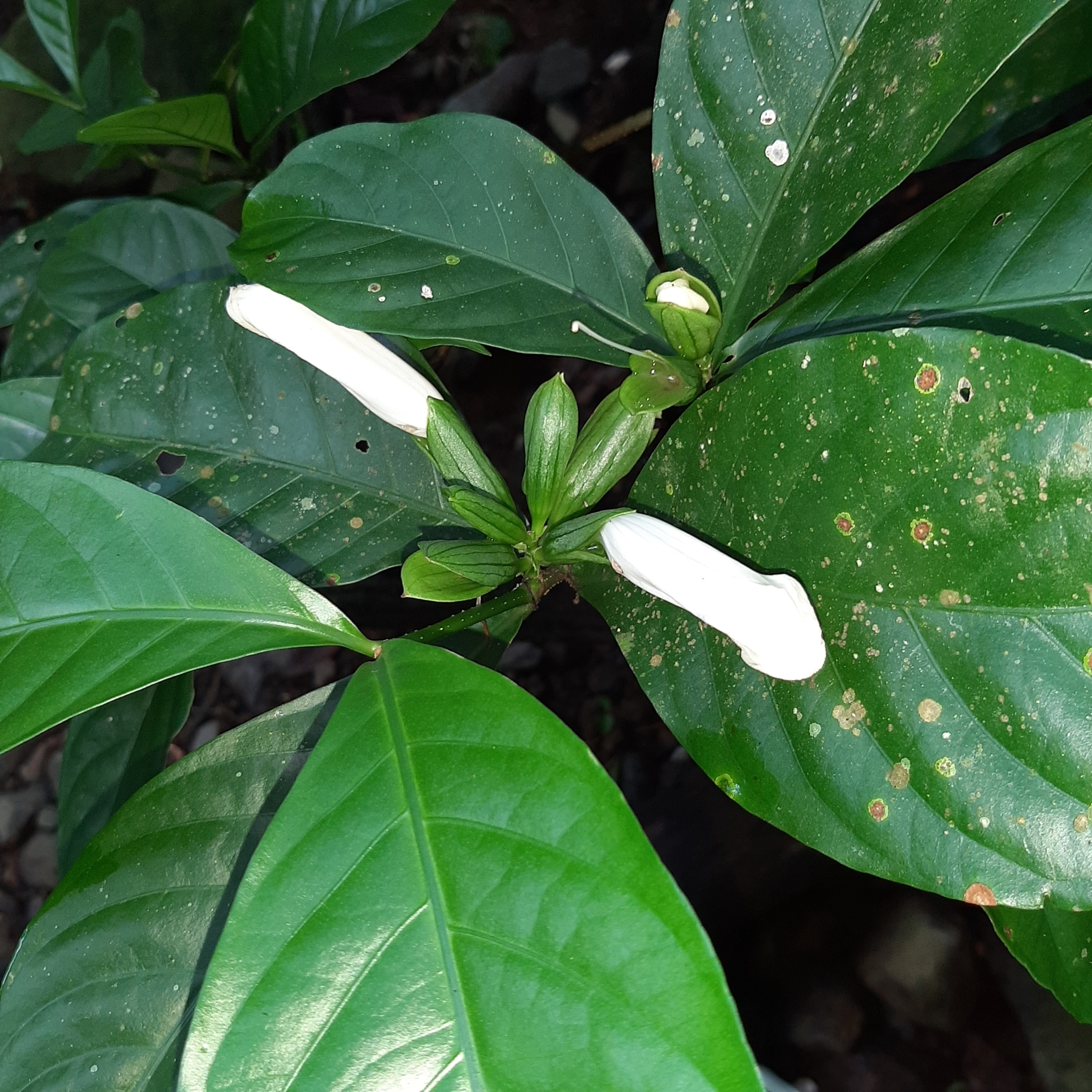
- Spathacanthus hoffmannii in Costa Rica

Scientific classification
- Kingdom: Plantae
- Clade: Tracheophytes
- Clade: Angiosperms
- Clade: Eudicots
- Clade: Asterids
- Order: Lamiales
- Family: Acanthaceae
- Subfamily: Acanthoideae
- Tribe: Justicieae
- Genus: Spathacanthus; Baill. (1891)

= Spathacanthus =

Genus of flowering plants

Spathacanthus is a genus of plants in the family Acanthaceae. It contains four species native to Mexico and Central America, ranging from central Mexico to Costa Rica.

== Species ==
Four species are accepted:

- Spathacanthus hahnianus Baill. – central Mexico to Honduras
- Spathacanthus hoffmannii Lindau – Costa Rica
- Spathacanthus magdalenae Cast.-Campos – central Veracruz
- Spathacanthus parviflorus Leonard – Veracruz and Chiapas to Guatemala
