= Neriacanthus =

Scientific classification
- Kingdom: Plantae
- Clade: Tracheophytes
- Clade: Angiosperms
- Clade: Eudicots
- Clade: Asterids
- Order: Lamiales
- Family: Acanthaceae
- Subfamily: Acanthoideae
- Tribe: Acantheae
- Genus: Neriacanthus; Benth. & Hook.f. (1876)

Synonyms
- Aphanandrium Lindau (1895)

Genus of flowering plants

Neriacanthus is a genus of flowering plants in the family Acanthaceae. It contains five species native to the tropical Americas, ranging from Jamaica and Panama to Venezuela, Colombia, Ecuador, and Peru.

== Species ==
Five species are accepted:

- Neriacanthus grandiflorus Leonard
- Neriacanthus harlingii Wassh.
- Neriacanthus lehmannianus (Lindau) Lindau
- Neriacanthus nitidus Leonard
- Neriacanthus purdieanus Benth. & Hook.f.
