= Jadunia =

Scientific classification
- Kingdom: Plantae
- Clade: Tracheophytes
- Clade: Angiosperms
- Clade: Eudicots
- Clade: Asterids
- Order: Lamiales
- Family: Acanthaceae
- Genus: Jadunia; Lindau (1913)

Genus of plants

Jadunia is a genus of flowering plants belonging to the family Acanthaceae.

Its native range is New Guinea.

Species:

- Jadunia biroi (Lindau & K.Schum.) Lindau
- Jadunia racemiflora Bremek.
