= Jadunia biroi =

Scientific classification
- Kingdom: Plantae
- Clade: Embryophytes
- Clade: Tracheophytes
- Clade: Angiosperms
- Clade: Eudicots
- Clade: Asterids
- Order: Lamiales
- Family: Acanthaceae
- Genus: Jadunia
- Species: J. biroi

Binomial name
- Jadunia biroi (Lindau & K.Schum.) Lindau

Synonyms
- Strobilanthes biroi Lindau & K.Schum.

Species of flowering plant

Jadunia biroi is a flowering plant in the Acanthaceae family. It grows in New Guinea.
