= List of Acanthaceae of South Africa =

List of flowering plants in the family Acanthaceae recorded from South Africa

Acanthaceae is a family of dicotyledonous flowering plants in the order Lamiales. The acanthus family includes almost 250 genera and about 2500 species. Most are tropical herbs, shrubs, or twining vines; some are epiphytes. Only a few species are distributed in temperate regions. The four main centres of distribution are Indonesia and Malaysia, Africa, Brazil, and Central America. Representatives of the family can be found in nearly every habitat, including dense or open forests, scrublands, wet fields and valleys, sea coast and marine areas, swamps, and mangrove forests.

23,420 species of vascular plant have been recorded in South Africa, making it the sixth most species-rich country in the world and the most species-rich country on the African continent. Of these, 153 species are considered to be threatened. Nine biomes have been described in South Africa: Fynbos, Succulent Karoo, desert, Nama Karoo, grassland, savanna, Albany thickets, the Indian Ocean coastal belt, and forests.

The 2018 South African National Biodiversity Institute's National Biodiversity Assessment plant checklist lists 35,130 taxa in the phyla Anthocerotophyta (hornworts (6)), Anthophyta (flowering plants (33534)), Bryophyta (mosses (685)), Cycadophyta (cycads (42)), Lycopodiophyta (Lycophytes(45)), Marchantiophyta (liverworts (376)), Pinophyta (conifers (33)), and Pteridophyta (cryptogams (408)).

66 genera are represented in the literature. Listed taxa include species, subspecies, varieties, and forms as recorded, some of which have subsequently been allocated to other taxa as synonyms, in which cases the accepted taxon is appended to the listing. Multiple entries under alternative names reflect taxonomic revision over time.

== Acanthodium ==
Genus Acanthodium:

- Acanthodium angustum Nees, accepted as Blepharis angusta (Nees) T.Anderson, indigenous
- Acanthodium capense (L.f.) Nees, accepted as Blepharis capensis (L.f.) Pers. indigenous
  - Acanthodium capense (L.f.) Nees var. a Nees, accepted as Blepharis capensis (L.f.) Pers.
  - Acanthodium capense (L.f.) Nees var. b Nees, accepted as Blepharis capensis (L.f.) Pers.
  - Acanthodium capense (L.f.) Nees var. inermis Nees, accepted as Blepharis inermis (Nees) C.B.Clarke
  - Acanthodium capense (L.f.) Nees var. integrifolium Nees, accepted as Blepharis capensis (L.f.) Pers. indigenous
  - Acanthodium capense (L.f.) Nees var. leucographum Nees, accepted as Blepharis capensis (L.f.) Pers. indigenous
  - Acanthodium capense (L.f.) Nees var. villosum Nees, accepted as Blepharis mitrata C.B.Clarke
  - Acanthodium capense (L.f.) Nees var. villosum Nees, accepted as Blepharis capensis (L.f.) Pers. indigenous
- Acanthodium carduifolium (L.f.) Nees, accepted as Acanthopsis carduifolia (L.f.) Schinz, indigenous
- Acanthodium dipsaceum E.Mey. accepted as Acanthopsis disperma Nees
- Acanthodium dispermum E.Mey. accepted as Acanthopsis disperma Nees
- Acanthodium diversispinum Nees, accepted as Blepharis diversispina (Nees) C.B.Clarke
  - Acanthodium diversispinum Nees var. a Nees, accepted as Blepharis serrulata (Nees) Ficalho & Hiern
- Acanthodium glabrum Nees, accepted as Acanthopsis glabra (Nees) H.M.Steyn, indigenous
- Acanthodium glaucum E.Mey. ex Nees, accepted as Acanthopsis glauca (E.Mey. ex Nees) Schinz, indigenous
- Acanthodium grossum Nees, accepted as Blepharis grossa (Nees) T.Anderson, indigenous
- Acanthodium hirtinervium Nees, accepted as Blepharis hirtinervia (Nees) T.Anderson, indigenous
- Acanthodium hoffmannseggianum Nees, accepted as Acanthopsis hoffmannseggiana (Nees) C.B.Clarke, indigenous
- Acanthodium macrum Nees, accepted as Blepharis macra (Nees) Vollesen
- Acanthodium marginatum Nees, accepted as Blepharis marginata (Nees) C.B.Clarke
- Acanthodium plumolosum E.Mey. ex Nees, accepted as Acanthopsis horrida (Nees) Nees, indigenous
- Acanthodium plumosum E.Mey. accepted as Acanthopsis horrida (Nees) Nees, indigenous
- Acanthodium serrulatum Nees, accepted as Blepharis serrulata (Nees) Ficalho & Hiern, indigenous
- Acanthodium sinuatum Nees, accepted as Blepharis sinuata (Nees) C.B.Clarke, indigenous
- Acanthodium spathulare Nees, accepted as Acanthopsis spathularis (Nees) Schinz, indigenous
- Acanthodium squarrosum Nees, accepted as Blepharis squarrosa (Nees) T.Anderson, indigenous

== Acanthopsis ==
Genus Acanthopsis:

- Acanthopsis carduifolia (L.f.) Schinz, endemic
  - Acanthopsis carduifolia (L.f.) Schinz var. glabra (Nees) Schinz, accepted as Acanthopsis glabra (Nees) H.M.Steyn, indigenous
  - Acanthopsis carduifolia (L.f.) Schinz var. longearistata Schinz, accepted as Acanthopsis disperma Nees
- Acanthopsis disperma Nees, indigenous
- Acanthopsis dispermoides H.M.Steyn, endemic
- Acanthopsis dregeana H.M.Steyn, endemic
  - Acanthopsis dregeana H.M.Steyn subsp. dregeana, endemic
  - Acanthopsis dregeana H.M.Steyn subsp. longispina H.M.Steyn, endemic
- Acanthopsis erosa H.M.Steyn, endemic
- Acanthopsis glabra (Nees) H.M.Steyn, endemic
- Acanthopsis glandulopalmata H.M.Steyn, endemic
- Acanthopsis glauca (E.Mey. ex Nees) Schinz, endemic
- Acanthopsis hoffmannseggiana (Nees) C.B.Clarke, indigenous
- Acanthopsis horrida (Nees) Nees, endemic
- Acanthopsis insueta H.M.Steyn, endemic
- Acanthopsis ludoviciana H.M.Steyn, endemic
- Acanthopsis nitida H.M.Steyn, endemic
- Acanthopsis scullyi (S.Moore) Oberm. endemic
- Acanthopsis spathularis (Nees) Schinz, endemic
- Acanthopsis tetragona H.M.Steyn, endemic
  - Acanthopsis tetragona H.M.Steyn subsp. pedunculata H.M.Steyn, endemic
  - Acanthopsis tetragona H.M.Steyn subsp. tetragona, endemic
- Acanthopsis trispina C.B.Clarke, accepted as Acanthopsis horrida (Nees) Nees, endemic
- Acanthopsis tuba H.M.Steyn, endemic
- Acanthopsis villosa H.M.Steyn, endemic

== Acanthus ==
Genus Acanthus:

- Acanthus arboreus Forssk. forma albiflorus Fiori, accepted as Acanthus polystachyus Delile
  - Acanthus arboreus Forssk. var. pubescens Thomson ex Oliv. accepted as Acanthus polystachyus Delile
- Acanthus capensis L.f. accepted as Blepharis capensis (L.f.) Pers.
- Acanthus carduifolius L.f. accepted as Acanthopsis carduifolia (L.f.) Schinz, indigenous
- Acanthus carduifolius Thunb. accepted as Acanthopsis carduifolia (L.f.) Schinz, indigenous
- Acanthus carduifolius Thunb. ß spica villosa E.Mey. accepted as Acanthopsis villosa H.M.Steyn
- Acanthus flamandii De Wild. accepted as Acanthus polystachyus Delile
- Acanthus furcatus L.f. accepted as Blepharis furcata (L.f.) Pers.
- Acanthus glaber E.Mey. accepted as Acanthopsis glabra (Nees) H.M.Steyn, indigenous
- Acanthus glaucescens E.Mey. accepted as Acanthopsis glauca (E.Mey. ex Nees) Schinz, indigenous
- Acanthus glaucus E.Mey. accepted as Acanthopsis glauca (E.Mey. ex Nees) Schinz, indigenous
- Acanthus integrifolius L.f. accepted as Blepharis integrifolia (L.f.) E.Mey. ex Schinz var. integrifolia
- Acanthus maderaspatensis L. accepted as Blepharis maderaspatensis (L.) Roth
- Acanthus mollis L. not indigenous, cultivated, naturalised, invasive
- Acanthus polystachyus Delile, not indigenous, naturalised
  - Acanthus polystachyus Delile var. pseudopubescens Cufod. accepted as Acanthus polystachyus Delile
- Acanthus procumbens L.f. accepted as Blepharis procumbens (L.f.) Pers.
- Acanthus pubescens (Thomson ex Oliv.) Engl. accepted as Acanthus polystachyus Delile, not indigenous, naturalised
- Acanthus spathularis E.Mey. accepted as Acanthopsis spathularis (Nees) Schinz, indigenous
- Acanthus ugandensis C.B.Clarke, accepted as Acanthus polystachyus Delile

== Adhatoda ==
Genus Adhatoda:

- Adhatoda anagalloides Nees, accepted as Justicia anagalloides (Nees) T.Anderson, indigenous
- Adhatoda andromeda (Lindau) C.B.Clarke, endemic
- Adhatoda anselliana Nees, accepted as Justicia anselliana (Nees) T.Anderson
- Adhatoda betonica (L.) Nees, accepted as Justicia betonica L. indigenous
- Adhatoda capensis (Thunb.) Nees, accepted as Justicia capensis Thunb. indigenous
- Adhatoda capensis (Thunb.) Nees var. arenosa Nees, accepted as Justicia debilis (Forssk.) Vahl, indigenous
- Adhatoda cheiranthifolia Nees, accepted as Justicia betonica L. indigenous
- Adhatoda densiflora (Hochst.) J.C.Manning, accepted as Justicia natalensis (Nees) T.Anderson, endemic
- Adhatoda divaricata (Licht. ex Roem. & Schult.) Nees, accepted as Justicia divaricata Licht. ex Roem. & Schult. indigenous
- Adhatoda duvernoia (Nees) C.B.Clarke, accepted as Justicia adhatodoides (E.Mey. ex Nees) V.A.W.Graham, indigenous
- Adhatoda eylesiii S.Moore, accepted as Isoglossa eylesii (S.Moore) Brummitt
- Adhatoda fasciata Nees, accepted as Justicia flava (Vahl) Vahl, indigenous
- Adhatoda flava (Vahl) Nees, accepted as Justicia flava (Vahl) Vahl, indigenous
- Adhatoda formosissima Klotzsch, accepted as Anisotes formosissimus (Klotzsch) Milne-Redh.
- Adhatoda incana (Nees) Nees, accepted as Justicia incana (Nees) T.Anderson, indigenous
- Adhatoda lupulina Nees, accepted as Justicia betonica L. indigenous
- Adhatoda matammensis Schweinf. accepted as Justicia matammensis (Schweinf.) Oliv. indigenous
- Adhatoda mollissima Nees, accepted as Justicia dregei J.C.Manning & Goldblatt, indigenous
- Adhatoda natalensis Nees, accepted as Justicia natalensis (Nees) T.Anderson, indigenous
- Adhatoda odora (Forssk.) Nees, accepted as Justicia odora (Forssk.) Lam. indigenous
- Adhatoda petiolaris Nees, accepted as Justicia petiolaris (Nees) T.Anderson subsp. petiolaris, indigenous
- Adhatoda protracta (Nees) Nees, accepted as Justicia protracta (Nees) T.Anderson, indigenous
- Adhatoda thymifolia Nees, accepted as Justicia thymifolia (Nees) C.B.Clarke, indigenous
- Adhatoda tubulosa E.Mey. ex Nees, accepted as Justicia tubulosa (E.Mey. ex Nees) T.Anderson subsp. tubulosa, indigenous
- Adhatoda variegata Nees var. pallidior Nees, accepted as Justicia betonica L. indigenous

== Angkalanthus ==
Genus Angkalanthus:

- Angkalanthus transvaalensis A.Meeuse, accepted as Chorisochora transvaalensis (A.Meeuse) Vollesen, indigenous

== Anisotes ==
Genus Anisotes:

- Anisotes formosissimus (Klotzsch) Milne-Redh. indigenous
- Anisotes rogersii S.Moore, indigenous

== Asteracantha ==
Genus Asteracantha:

- Asteracantha longifolia (L.) Nees, accepted as Hygrophila auriculata (Schumach.) Heine

== Asystasia ==
Genus Asystasia:

- Asystasia atriplicifolia Bremek. endemic
- Asystasia coromandeliana Nees var. micrantha Nees, accepted as Asystasia gangetica (L.) T.Anderson subsp. micrantha (Nees) Ensermu, indigenous
- Asystasia gangetica (L.) T.Anderson, indigenous
  - Asystasia gangetica (L.) T.Anderson subsp. micrantha (Nees) Ensermu, indigenous
- Asystasia mysorensis (Roth) T.Anderson, indigenous
- Asystasia natalensis C.B.Clarke, accepted as Salpinctium natalense (C.B.Clarke) T.J.Edwards
- Asystasia pinguifolia T.J.Edwards, accepted as Asystasia gangetica (L.) T.Anderson subsp. micrantha (Nees) Ensermu, indigenous
- Asystasia retrocarpa T.J.Edwards, indigenous
- Asystasia schimperi T.Anderson, accepted as Asystasia mysorensis (Roth) T.Anderson, indigenous
- Asystasia stenosiphon C.B.Clarke, accepted as Salpinctium stenosiphon (C.B.Clarke) T.J.Edwards
- Asystasia subbiflora C.B.Clarke, endemic
- Asystasia varia N.E.Br. endemic

== Aulojusticia ==
Genus Aulojusticia:

- Aulojusticia linifolia Lindau, accepted as Justicia linifolia (Lindau) V.A.W.Graham, indigenous

== Avicennia ==
Genus Avicennia:

- Avicennia marina (Forssk.) Vierh. indigenous

== Barleria ==
Genus Barleria:

- Barleria affinis C.B.Clarke, indigenous
  - Barleria affinis C.B.Clarke subsp. affinis, indigenous
- Barleria alata S.Moore, accepted as Barleria lancifolia T.Anderson subsp. lancifolia
- Barleria albida Lindau, accepted as Barleria senensis Klotzsch
- Barleria albi-pilosa Hainz, accepted as Barleria matopensis S.Moore
- Barleria albostellata C.B.Clarke, indigenous
- Barleria argillicola Oberm. endemic
- Barleria auriculata Schumach. accepted as Hygrophila auriculata (Schumach.) Heine
- Barleria barbata E.Mey. ex C.B.Clarke, accepted as Barleria gueinzii Sond. indigenous
- Barleria bechuanensis C.B.Clarke, endemic
- Barleria bolusii Oberm. endemic
- Barleria bremekampii Oberm. indigenous
- Barleria burchelliana Nees, accepted as Barleria macrostegia Nees, indigenous
- Barleria cinereicaulis C.B.Clarke, accepted as Barleria lancifolia T.Anderson, indigenous
- Barleria coriacea Oberm. indigenous
- Barleria crossandriformis C.B.Clarke, indigenous
- Barleria delagoensis Oberm. indigenous
- Barleria dinteri Oberm. indigenous
- Barleria dolomiticola M.Balkwill & K.Balkwill, endemic
- Barleria eenii S.Moore, accepted as Barleria senensis Klotzsch
- Barleria elegans S.Moore ex C.B.Clarke, indigenous
  - Barleria elegans S.Moore ex C.B.Clarke subsp. orientalis I.Darbysh. indigenous
- Barleria exellii Benoist, accepted as Barleria lancifolia T.Anderson
- Barleria galpinii C.B.Clarke, indigenous
- Barleria gossweileri S.Moore, accepted as Barleria lancifolia T.Anderson
- Barleria greenii M.Balkwill & K.Balkwill, endemic
- Barleria gueinzii Sond. indigenous
- Barleria halimoides Nees, accepted as Petalidium halimoides (Nees) S.Moore
- Barleria hereroensis Engl. accepted as Barleria lancifolia T.Anderson
- Barleria heterotricha Lindau, indigenous
  - Barleria heterotricha Lindau subsp. heterotricha, indigenous
- Barleria holubii C.B.Clarke, indigenous
  - Barleria holubii C.B.Clarke subsp. holubii, indigenous
- Barleria ilicina E.Mey. ex T.Anderson, accepted as Barleria rigida Nees, indigenous
- Barleria irritans Nees, endemic
  - Barleria irritans Nees var. rigida (Nees) C.B.Clarke, accepted as Barleria rigida Nees, indigenous
- Barleria jasminiflora C.B.Clarke, endemic
- Barleria lancifolia T.Anderson, indigenous
- Barleria latiloba Engl. accepted as Barleria lancifolia T.Anderson
- Barleria lichtensteiniana Nees, indigenous
- Barleria longifolia L. accepted as Hygrophila auriculata (Schumach.) Heine
- Barleria mackenii Hook.f. indigenous
- Barleria macrostegia Nees, indigenous
- Barleria marlothii Engl. accepted as Barleria damarensis T.Anderson
- Barleria matopensis S.Moore, indigenous
- Barleria media C.B.Clarke, endemic
- Barleria meyeriana Nees, indigenous
- Barleria monticola Oberm. endemic
- Barleria mosdenensis Oberm. accepted as Barleria bolusii Oberm. indigenous
  - Barleria mosdenensis Oberm. var. hirsuta Oberm. accepted as Barleria bolusii Oberm. indigenous
- Barleria namutonensis Oberm. accepted as Barleria prionitis L. subsp. prionitoides (Engl.) Brummitt & J.R.I.Wood
- Barleria natalensis Lindau, endemic
- Barleria obtusa Nees, indigenous
  - Barleria obtusa Nees var. cymulosa Hochst. accepted as Barleria obtusa Nees, indigenous
- Barleria ovata E.Mey. ex Nees, indigenous
- Barleria oxyphylla Lindau, indigenous
- Barleria papillosa T.Anderson, indigenous; nend
- Barleria pretoriensis C.B.Clarke, indigenous
- Barleria prionitis L. indigenous
  - Barleria prionitis L. subsp. delagoensis (Oberm.) Brummitt & J.R.I.Wood, accepted as Barleria delagoensis Oberm. indigenous
- Barleria pungens L.f. endemic
- Barleria quadriloba Oberm. indigenous
- Barleria randii S.Moore, indigenous
- Barleria rautanenii Schinz, accepted as Barleria lancifolia T.Anderson
- Barleria rehmannii C.B.Clarke, indigenous
- Barleria repens Nees, indigenous
- Barleria rigida Nees, indigenous
  - Barleria rigida Nees var. ilicina (E.Mey. ex T.Anderson) Oberm. accepted as Barleria rigida Nees, indigenous
- Barleria rogersii S.Moore, accepted as Barleria taitensis S.Moore subsp. rogersii (S.Moore) I.Darbysh. indigenous
- Barleria rotundifolia Oberm. endemic
- Barleria sacani Klotzsch ex Lindau, accepted as Neuracanthus africanus T.Anderson ex S.Moore var. africanus
- Barleria saxatilis Oberm. indigenous
- Barleria schenckii Schinz, accepted as Barleria rigida Nees
- Barleria senensis Klotzsch, indigenous
- Barleria spathulata N.E.Br. accepted as Barleria senensis Klotzsch
- Barleria spinulosa Klotzsch, indigenous
  - Barleria spinulosa Klotzsch subsp. spinulosa, indigenous
- Barleria stimulans E.Mey. ex Nees, endemic
- Barleria taitensis S.Moore, indigenous
  - Barleria taitensis S.Moore subsp. rogersii (S.Moore) I.Darbysh. indigenous
- Barleria transvaalensis Oberm. accepted as Barleria virgula C.B.Clarke, endemic
- Barleria ventricosa Hochst. ex Nees, indigenous
- Barleria virgula C.B.Clarke, indigenous
- Barleria wilmsiana Lindau, endemic
- Barleria wilmsii Lindau ex C.B.Clarke, accepted as Barleria wilmsiana Lindau
- Barleria woodii C.B.Clarke, accepted as Barleria natalensis Lindau

== Blepharacanthus ==
Genus Blepharacanthus:

- Blepharacanthus capensis (L.f.) Nees, accepted as Blepharis capensis (L.f.) Pers. indigenous
- Blepharacanthus carduifolius (L.f.) Nees, accepted as Acanthopsis carduifolia (L.f.) Schinz, indigenous

== Blepharis ==
Genus Blepharis:

- Blepharis acanthodioides Klotzsch, indigenous
- Blepharis acaulis Lindau, accepted as Acanthopsis disperma Nees
- Blepharis acuminata Oberm. endemic
- Blepharis aequisepala Vollesen, endemic
- Blepharis angusta (Nees) T.Anderson, endemic
- Blepharis aspera Oberm. indigenous
- Blepharis boerhaviifolia Pers. accepted as Blepharis maderaspatensis (L.) Roth
- Blepharis bossii Oberm. accepted as Blepharis obmitrata C.B.Clarke
- Blepharis breyeri Oberm. endemic
- Blepharis caloneura S.Moore var. angustifolia Oberm. accepted as Blepharis tenuiramea S.Moore
- Blepharis capensis (L.f.) Pers. endemic
  - Blepharis capensis (L.f.) Pers. var. latibracteata Oberm. accepted as Blepharis capensis (L.f.) Pers. indigenous
  - Blepharis capensis (L.f.) Pers. var. prostrata Oberm. accepted as Blepharis capensis (L.f.) Pers. indigenous
- Blepharis carduifolia (L.f.) T.Anderson, accepted as Acanthopsis carduifolia (L.f.) Schinz, indigenous
  - Blepharis carduifolia (L.f.) T.Anderson var. glabra (Nees) T.Anderson, accepted as Acanthopsis glabra (Nees) H.M.Steyn, indigenous
- Blepharis clarkei Schinz, accepted as Blepharis integrifolia (L.f.) E.Mey. ex Schinz var. clarkei (Schinz) Oberm.
- Blepharis dichotoma Engl. accepted as Blepharis grossa (Nees) T.Anderson
- Blepharis dilatata C.B.Clarke, endemic
  - Blepharis dilatata C.B.Clarke var. explicator C.B.Clarke, accepted as Blepharis subvolubilis C.B.Clarke, indigenous
- Blepharis diversispina (Nees) C.B.Clarke, indigenous
- Blepharis ecklonii C.B.Clarke, accepted as Blepharis hirtinervia (Nees) T.Anderson, indigenous
- Blepharis espinosa E.Phillips, indigenous
  - Blepharis espinosa E.Phillips var. spinosa Oberm. accepted as Blepharis espinosa E.Phillips, indigenous
- Blepharis extenuata S.Moore, accepted as Blepharis macra (Nees) Vollesen, endemic
- Blepharis fenestralis Vollesen, endemic
- Blepharis furcata (L.f.) Pers. indigenous
- Blepharis gerlindae P.G.Mey. accepted as Blepharis obmitrata C.B.Clarke
- Blepharis glauca (E.Mey. ex Nees) T.Anderson, accepted as Acanthopsis glauca (E.Mey. ex Nees) Schinz, indigenous
- Blepharis grisea S.Moore, accepted as Blepharis diversispina (Nees) C.B.Clarke
- Blepharis grossa (Nees) T.Anderson, indigenous
- Blepharis hildebrandii Lindau, accepted as Blepharis integrifolia (L.f.) E.Mey. ex Schinz var. integrifolia
- Blepharis hirtinervia (Nees) T.Anderson, endemic
- Blepharis ilicina Oberm. endemic
- Blepharis inaequalis C.B.Clarke, endemic
- Blepharis inermis (Nees) C.B.Clarke, endemic
- Blepharis innocua C.B.Clarke, endemic
  - Blepharis innocua C.B.Clarke var. lancifolia Oberm. accepted as Blepharis innocua C.B.Clarke, present
- Blepharis integrifolia (L.f.) E.Mey. ex Schinz, indigenous
  - Blepharis integrifolia (L.f.) E.Mey. ex Schinz var. clarkei (Schinz) Oberm. indigenous
  - Blepharis integrifolia (L.f.) E.Mey. ex Schinz var. integrifolia, indigenous
  - Blepharis integrifolia (L.f.) E.Mey. ex Schinz var. setosa (Nees) Oberm. accepted as Blepharis integrifolia (L.f.) E.Mey. ex Schinz var. integrifolia, present
- Blepharis laevifolia Vollesen, endemic
- Blepharis leendertziae Oberm. indigenous
- Blepharis longispica C.B.Clarke, endemic
- Blepharis macra (Nees) Vollesen, indigenous
- Blepharis maderaspatensis (L.) Roth, indigenous
  - Blepharis maderaspatensis (L.) Roth subsp. rubiifolia (Schumach.) Napper, accepted as Blepharis maderaspatensis (L.) Roth, present
- Blepharis marginata (Nees) C.B.Clarke, endemic
- Blepharis mitrata C.B.Clarke, indigenous
- Blepharis molluginifolia Pers. accepted as Blepharis integrifolia (L.f.) E.Mey. ex Schinz var. integrifolia
- Blepharis naegelsbachii Oberm. accepted as Blepharis obmitrata C.B.Clarke
- Blepharis natalensis Oberm. endemic
- Blepharis obermeyerae Vollesen, indigenous
- Blepharis obtusisepala Oberm. endemic
- Blepharis procumbens (L.f.) Pers. endemic
- Blepharis rubiifolia (Schumach.) Napper, accepted as Blepharis maderaspatensis (L.) Roth
- Blepharis saxatilis Oberm. accepted as Blepharis subvolubilis C.B.Clarke, indigenous
- Blepharis scullyi S.Moore, accepted as Acanthopsis scullyi (S.Moore) Oberm. indigenous
- Blepharis sericea Vollesen, endemic
- Blepharis serrulata (Nees) Ficalho & Hiern, indigenous
- Blepharis setosa Nees, accepted as Blepharis integrifolia (L.f.) E.Mey. ex Schinz var. integrifolia
- Blepharis sinuata (Nees) C.B.Clarke, endemic
- Blepharis spathularis (Nees) T.Anderson, accepted as Acanthopsis spathularis (Nees) Schinz, indigenous
- Blepharis spinipes Vollesen, endemic
- Blepharis squarrosa (Nees) T.Anderson, endemic
- Blepharis stainbankiae C.B.Clarke, endemic
  - Blepharis stainbankiae C.B.Clarke var. explicator (C.B.Clarke) Oberm. accepted as Blepharis subvolubilis C.B.Clarke
- Blepharis subglabra Vollesen, endemic
- Blepharis subvolubilis C.B.Clarke, indigenous
  - Blepharis subvolubilis C.B.Clarke var. longifolia Oberm. accepted as Blepharis subvolubilis C.B.Clarke, indigenous
- Blepharis swaziensis Vollesen, indigenous
- Blepharis teaguei Oberm. accepted as Blepharis maderaspatensis (L.) Roth
- Blepharis transvaalensis Schinz, indigenous
- Blepharis trispinosa Hainz, accepted as Blepharis furcata (L.f.) Pers.
- Blepharis uniflora C.B.Clarke, indigenous
- Blepharis villosa C.B.Clarke, accepted as Blepharis mitrata C.B.Clarke, present

== Calophanes ==
Genus Calophanes:

- Calophanes crenata Schinz, accepted as Asystasia mysorensis (Roth) T.Anderson, indigenous
- Calophanes perrottetii Nees, accepted as Dyschoriste perrottetii (Nees) Kuntze
- Calophanes persoonii (Nees) T.Anderson, accepted as Dyschoriste setigera (Pers.) J.C.Manning & Goldblatt
- Calophanes radicans T.Anderson, accepted as Dyschoriste mutica (S.Moore) C.B.Clarke
  - Calophanes radicans T.Anderson var. mutica S.Moore, accepted as Dyschoriste mutica (S.Moore) C.B.Clarke
- Calophanes setosus Nees, accepted as Ruelliopsis setosa (Nees) C.B.Clarke

== Chaetacanthus ==
Genus Chaetacanthus (synonym of Dyschoriste):

- Chaetacanthus burchellii Nees, accepted as Dyschoriste burchellii (Nees) Kuntze, indigenous
- Chaetacanthus costatus Nees, accepted as Dyschoriste costata (Nees) Kuntze, endemic
- Chaetacanthus glandulosus Nees, accepted as Dyschoriste setigera (Pers.) J.C.Manning & Goldblatt
- Chaetacanthus persoonii C.B.Clarke, accepted as Dyschoriste setigera (Pers.) J.C.Manning & Goldblatt
- Chaetacanthus setiger (Pers.) Lindl. accepted as Dyschoriste setigera (Pers.) J.C.Manning & Goldblatt, indigenous

== Chorisochora ==
Genus Chorisochora:

- Chorisochora transvaalensis (A.Meeuse) Vollesen, indigenous

== Crabbea ==
Genus Crabbea:

- Crabbea acaulis N.E.Br. indigenous
- Crabbea angustifolia Nees, endemic
- Crabbea cirsioides (Nees) Nees, accepted as Crabbea hirsuta Harv.
- Crabbea galpinii C.B.Clarke, indigenous
- Crabbea hirsuta Harv. indigenous
- Crabbea nana Nees, indigenous
- Crabbea ovalifolia Ficalho & Hiern, indigenous
- Crabbea pedunculata N.E.Br. accepted as Crabbea nana Nees
- Crabbea reticulata C.B.Clarke, accepted as Crabbea velutina S.Moore
- Crabbea robusta N.E.Br. accepted as Crabbea hirsuta Harv.
- Crabbea undulatifolia Engl. accepted as Crabbea angustifolia Nees
- Crabbea velutina S.Moore, indigenous

== Crossandra ==
Genus Crossandra:

- Crossandra fruticulosa Lindau, indigenous
- Crossandra greenstockii S.Moore, indigenous
- Crossandra mucronata Lindau, indigenous
- Crossandra zuluensis W.T.Vos & T.J.Edwards, indigenous

== Dianthera ==
Genus Dianthera:

- Dianthera bicalyculata Retz. accepted as Dicliptera paniculata (Forssk.) I.Darbysh.
- Dianthera debilis Forssk. accepted as Justicia debilis (Forssk.) Vahl, indigenous
- Dianthera flava Vahl, accepted as Justicia flava (Vahl) Vahl, indigenous
- Dianthera malabarica L.f. accepted as Dicliptera paniculata (Forssk.) I.Darbysh.
- Dianthera odora Forssk. accepted as Justicia odora (Forssk.) Lam. indigenous
- Dianthera paniculata Forssk. accepted as Dicliptera paniculata (Forssk.) I.Darbysh.
- Dianthera verticillata Forssk. accepted as Dicliptera verticillata (Forssk.) C.Chr.

== Diapedium ==
Genus Diapedium:

- Diapedium clinopodium (Nees) Kuntze, accepted as Dicliptera clinopodia Nees, indigenous
  - Diapedium clinopodium (Nees) Kuntze var. minor S.Moore, accepted as Dicliptera clinopodia Nees, indigenous

== Dicliptera ==
Genus Dicliptera:

- Dicliptera capensis Nees, endemic
- Dicliptera cernua (Hook.f. ex Nees) I.Darbysh. accepted as Dicliptera cernua (Hook.f. ex Nees) J.C.Manning & Goldblatt, indigenous
- Dicliptera cernua (Hook.f. ex Nees) J.C.Manning & Goldblatt, indigenous
- Dicliptera cliffordii (K.Balkwill) J.C.Manning & Goldblatt, indigenous
- Dicliptera clinopodia Nees, indigenous
- Dicliptera decorticans (K.Balkwill) I.Darbysh. indigenous
- Dicliptera decorticans (K.Balkwill) J.C.Manning & Goldblatt, accepted as Dicliptera decorticans (K.Balkwill) I.Darbysh. indigenous
- Dicliptera divaricata Compton, accepted as Dicliptera minor C.B.Clarke subsp. divaricata (Compton) I.Darbysh. indigenous
- Dicliptera eenii S.Moore, indigenous
- Dicliptera extenta S.Moore, indigenous
- Dicliptera fionae K.Balkwill, endemic
- Dicliptera fruticosa K.Balkwill, endemic
- Dicliptera gillilandiorum (K.Balkwill) I.Darbysh. indigenous
- Dicliptera gillilandiorum (K.Balkwill) J.C.Manning & Goldblatt, accepted as Dicliptera gillilandiorum (K.Balkwill) I.Darbysh. indigenous
- Dicliptera heterostegia Nees, indigenous
- Dicliptera leistneri K.Balkwill, endemic
- Dicliptera magaliesbergensis K.Balkwill, endemic
- Dicliptera marlothii Engl. accepted as Megalochlamys marlothii (Engl.) Lindau
- Dicliptera minor C.B.Clarke, indigenous
  - Dicliptera minor C.B.Clarke subsp. divaricata (Compton) I.Darbysh. indigenous
  - Dicliptera minor C.B.Clarke subsp. minor, indigenous
  - Dicliptera minor C.B.Clarke subsp. pratis-manna K.Balkwill, endemic
- Dicliptera monroi S.Moore, indigenous
- Dicliptera mossambicensis Klotzsch, accepted as Dicliptera heterostegia Nees, indigenous
- Dicliptera ovata C.Presl, accepted as Isoglossa ovata (Nees) Lindau, indigenous
- Dicliptera paniculata (Forssk.) I.Darbysh. indigenous
- Dicliptera paniculata (Forssk.) J.C.Manning & Goldblatt, accepted as Dicliptera paniculata (Forssk.) I.Darbysh.
- Dicliptera propinqua Nees, accepted as Dicliptera capensis Nees, indigenous
- Dicliptera quintasii Lindau, indigenous
- Dicliptera schumanniana Schinz, accepted as Megalochlamys marlothii (Engl.) Lindau
- Dicliptera spinulosa Hochst. ex K.Balkwill, accepted as Dicliptera verticillata (Forssk.) C.Chr. indigenous
- Dicliptera swynnertonii S.Moore, indigenous
- Dicliptera transvaalensis C.B.Clarke, indigenous
- Dicliptera umbellata (Vahl) Juss. accepted as Dicliptera verticillata (Forssk.) C.Chr.
- Dicliptera verticillata (Forssk.) C.Chr. indigenous

== Dilivaria ==
Genus Dilivaria:

- Dilivaria horrida Nees, accepted as Acanthopsis horrida (Nees) Nees, indigenous

== Dinteracanthus ==
Genus Dinteracanthus:

- Dinteracanthus asper Schinz, accepted as Ruellia aspera (Schinz) E.Phillips
- Dinteracanthus marlothii (Engl.) Schinz, accepted as Ruellia diversifolia S.Moore

== Dipteracanthus ==
Genus Dipteracanthus:

- Dipteracanthus cordifolius Nees, accepted as Ruellia cordata Thunb. indigenous
- Dipteracanthus zeyheri Sond. accepted as Ruellia pilosa L.f. indigenous

== Duosperma ==
Genus Duosperma:

- Duosperma crenatum (Lindau) P.G.Mey. indigenous

== Duvernoia ==
Genus Duvernoia:

- Duvernoia aconitiflora A.Meeuse, accepted as Justicia aconitiflora (A.Meeuse) Cubey, indigenous
- Duvernoia adhatodoides E.Mey. ex Nees, accepted as Justicia adhatodoides (E.Mey. ex Nees) V.A.W.Graham, endemic
- Duvernoia andromeda Lindau, accepted as Adhatoda andromeda (Lindau) C.B.Clarke, indigenous

== Dyschoriste ==
Genus Dyschoriste:

- Dyschoriste burchellii (Nees) Kuntze, indigenous
- Dyschoriste costata (Nees) Kuntze, endemic
- Dyschoriste depressa (L.) Nees, indigenous
- Dyschoriste erecta C.B.Clarke, endemic
- Dyschoriste fischeri Lindau, indigenous
- Dyschoriste fleckii Schinz, accepted as Ruelliopsis damarensis S.Moore
- Dyschoriste monroi S.Moore, indigenous
- Dyschoriste mutica (S.Moore) C.B.Clarke, indigenous
- Dyschoriste perrottetii (Nees) Kuntze, indigenous
- Dyschoriste pseuderecta Mildbr. indigenous
- Dyschoriste rogersii S.Moore, indigenous
- Dyschoriste setigera (Pers.) J.C.Manning & Goldblatt, indigenous
- Dyschoriste setigera (Pers.) Vollesen, accepted as Dyschoriste setigera (Pers.) J.C.Manning & Goldblatt, indigenous
- Dyschoriste transvaalensis C.B.Clarke, indigenous

== Ecbolium ==
Genus Ecbolium:

- Ecbolium clarkei Hiern, indigenous
- Ecbolium cognatum N.E.Br. accepted as Megalochlamys revoluta (Lindau) Vollesen subsp. cognata (N.E.Br.) Vollesen
- Ecbolium flanaganii C.B.Clarke, endemic
- Ecbolium glabratum Vollesen, indigenous
- Ecbolium hamatum (Klotzsch) C.B.Clarke, accepted as Megalochlamys hamata (Klotzsch) Vollesen

== Ecteinanthus ==
Genus Ecteinanthus:

- Ecteinanthus divaricatus T.Anderson, accepted as Isoglossa ciliata (Nees) Engl. indigenous
- Ecteinanthus ecklonianus (Nees) T.Anderson, accepted as Isoglossa origanoides (Nees) S.Moore, indigenous
- Ecteinanthus origanoides (Nees) T.Anderson, accepted as Isoglossa origanoides (Nees) S.Moore, indigenous
- Ecteinanthus ovata (E.Mey. ex Nees) T.Anderson, accepted as Isoglossa ovata (Nees) Lindau, indigenous
- Ecteinanthus prolixus (Nees) T.Anderson, accepted as Isoglossa prolixa (Nees) Lindau, indigenous

== Elytraria ==
Genus Elytraria:

- Elytraria lyrata Vahl, indigenous

== Eranthemum ==
Genus Eranthemum:

- Eranthemum decurrens Hochst. ex Nees, accepted as Ruspolia decurrens (Hochst. ex Nees) Milne-Redh.
- Eranthemum hildebrandtii (Lindau) C.B.Clarke, accepted as Pseuderanthemum hildebrandtii Lindau, indigenous
- Eranthemum seticalyx C.B.Clarke, accepted as Ruspolia seticalyx (C.B.Clarke) Milne-Redh.
- Eranthemum subviscosum C.B.Clarke, accepted as Pseuderanthemum subviscosum (C.B.Clarke) Stapf, indigenous

== Gendarussa ==
Genus Gendarussa:

- Gendarussa capensis (Thunb.) Nees, accepted as Justicia capensis Thunb. indigenous
- Gendarussa debilis (Forssk.) Nees, accepted as Justicia debilis (Forssk.) Vahl, indigenous
- Gendarussa densiflora Hochst. accepted as Justicia natalensis (Nees) T.Anderson, indigenous
- Gendarussa incana Nees, accepted as Justicia incana (Nees) T.Anderson, indigenous
  - Gendarussa incana Nees var. villosa Nees, accepted as Justicia debilis (Forssk.) Vahl
- Gendarussa leptantha Nees, accepted as Justicia tubulosa (E.Mey. ex Nees) T.Anderson subsp. tubulosa, indigenous
- Gendarussa mollis Hochst. accepted as Justicia protracta (Nees) T.Anderson, indigenous
- Gendarussa orchioides (L.f.) Nees, accepted as Justicia cuneata Vahl subsp. latifolia (Nees) Immelman
- & Gendarussa orchioides (L.f.) Nees var. latifolia Nees, accepted as Justicia cuneata Vahl subsp. latifolia (Nees) Immelman, indigenous
- Gendarussa protracta Nees, accepted as Justicia protracta (Nees) T.Anderson, indigenous
- Gendarussa prunellaefolia Hochst. accepted as Justicia protracta (Nees) T.Anderson, indigenous

== Glossochilus ==
Genus Glossochilus:

- Glossochilus burchellii Nees, indigenous
- Glossochilus parviflorus Hutch. accepted as Asystasia mysorensis (Roth) T.Anderson, endemic

== Hemigraphis ==
Genus Hemigraphis:

- Hemigraphis abyssinica (Hochst. ex Nees) C.B.Clarke, accepted as Hygrophila abyssinica (Hochst. ex Nees) T.Anderson
- Hemigraphis prunelloides S.Moore, accepted as Hygrophila prunelloides (S.Moore) Heine

== Hygrophila ==
Genus Hygrophila:

- Hygrophila auriculata (Schumach.) Heine, indigenous
- Hygrophila crenata Lindau, accepted as Duosperma crenatum (Lindau) P.G.Mey.
- Hygrophila spinosa T.Anderson, accepted as Hygrophila auriculata (Schumach.) Heine

== Hypoestes ==
Genus Hypoestes:

- Hypoestes antennifera S.Moore, accepted as Hypoestes aristata (Vahl) Sol. ex Roem. & Schult. var. aristata
- Hypoestes aristata (Vahl) Sol. ex Roem. & Schult. indigenous
  - Hypoestes aristata (Vahl) Sol. ex Roem. & Schult. var. alba K.Balkwill, indigenous
  - Hypoestes aristata (Vahl) Sol. ex Roem. & Schult. var. aristata, indigenous
  - Hypoestes aristata (Vahl) Sol. ex Roem. & Schult. var. thiniorum K.Balkwill, endemic
- Hypoestes depauperata Lindau, accepted as Hypoestes forskaolii (Vahl) R.Br.
- Hypoestes forskaolii (Vahl) R.Br. indigenous
- Hypoestes phaylopsoides S.Moore, accepted as Hypoestes triflora (Forssk.) Roem. & Schult.
- Hypoestes phyllostachya Baker, not indigenous, cultivated, naturalised, invasive
- Hypoestes triflora (Forssk.) Roem. & Schult. indigenous
- Hypoestes verticillaris (L.f.) Sol. ex Roem. & Schult. accepted as Hypoestes aristata (Vahl) Sol. ex Roem. & Schult. var. aristata

== Isoglossa ==
Genus Isoglossa:

- Isoglossa bachmannii Lindau, accepted as Isoglossa ovata (Nees) Lindau, indigenous
- Isoglossa bolusii C.B.Clarke, accepted as Isoglossa macowanii C.B.Clarke, indigenous
- Isoglossa bolusii C.B.Clarke, accepted as Isoglossa delicatula C.B.Clarke, indigenous
- Isoglossa ciliata (Nees) Engl. indigenous
- Isoglossa cooperi C.B.Clarke, endemic
- Isoglossa delicatula C.B.Clarke, indigenous
- Isoglossa densa N.E.Br. accepted as Isoglossa ciliata (Nees) Engl. endemic
- Isoglossa eckloniana (Nees) Lindau, accepted as Isoglossa origanoides (Nees) S.Moore, indigenous
- Isoglossa glandulosissima K.Balkwill, indigenous
- Isoglossa gracilenta K.Balkwill, endemic
- Isoglossa grantii C.B.Clarke, accepted as Isoglossa woodii C.B.Clarke, indigenous
- Isoglossa hypoestiflora Lindau, indigenous
- Isoglossa macowanii C.B.Clarke, indigenous
- Isoglossa origanoides (Nees) S.Moore, endemic
- Isoglossa ovata (Nees) Lindau, endemic
- Isoglossa pondoensis K.Balkwill, endemic
- Isoglossa prolixa (Nees) Lindau, endemic
- Isoglossa stipitata C.B.Clarke, accepted as Isoglossa woodii C.B.Clarke, endemic
- Isoglossa sylvatica C.B.Clarke, accepted as Isoglossa ciliata (Nees) Engl. endemic
- Isoglossa woodii C.B.Clarke, endemic

== Justicia ==
Genus Justicia:

- Justicia aconitiflora (A.Meeuse) Cubey, indigenous
- Justicia aconitiflora (A.Meeuse) Vollesen, accepted as Justicia aconitiflora (A.Meeuse) Cubey, indigenous
- Justicia adhatodoides (E.Mey. ex Nees) V.A.W.Graham, endemic
- Justicia anagalloides (Nees) T.Anderson, indigenous
- Justicia andromeda (Lindau) J.C.Manning & Goldblatt, accepted as Adhatoda andromeda (Lindau) C.B.Clarke, endemic
- Justicia atherstonei T.Anderson, accepted as Justicia spartioides T.Anderson, indigenous
- Justicia australis (P.G.Mey.) Vollesen, indigenous
- Justicia betonica L. indigenous
- Justicia betonicoides C.B.Clarke, accepted as Justicia betonica L. indigenous
- Justicia bicalyculata (Retz.) Vahl, accepted as Dicliptera paniculata (Forssk.) I.Darbysh.
- Justicia bolusii C.B.Clarke, endemic
- Justicia bracteata (Hochst.) Zarb, indigenous
- Justicia campylostemon (Nees) T.Anderson, indigenous
- Justicia capensis Eckl. ex Nees, accepted as Dicliptera cernua (Hook.f. ex Nees) J.C.Manning & Goldblatt
- Justicia capensis Thunb. indigenous
- Justicia cheiranthifolia (Nees) C.B.Clarke, accepted as Justicia betonica L. indigenous
- Justicia clinopodia E.Mey. accepted as Dicliptera clinopodia Nees, indigenous
- Justicia crassiradix C.B.Clarke var. hispida C.B.Clarke, accepted as Justicia anagalloides (Nees) T.Anderson
- Justicia crassiuscula (P.G.Mey.) J.C.Manning & Goldblatt, indigenous
- Justicia cuneata Vahl, indigenous
  - Justicia cuneata Vahl subsp. cuneata, endemic
  - Justicia cuneata Vahl subsp. latifolia (Nees) Immelman, endemic
- Justicia cuspidata Vahl, accepted as Dicliptera verticillata (Forssk.) C.Chr.
- Justicia debilis (Forssk.) Vahl, indigenous
  - Justicia debilis (Forssk.) Vahl var. angustifolia (Nees) Oliv. accepted as Justicia bracteata (Hochst.) Zarb
- Justicia densiflora (Hochst.) J.C.Manning & Goldblatt, accepted as Justicia natalensis (Nees) T.Anderson, endemic
- Justicia dinteri S.Moore, accepted as Justicia heterocarpa T.Anderson subsp. dinteri (S.Moore) Hedren, indigenous
- Justicia distichotricha Lindau, indigenous
- Justicia divaricata (Licht. ex Roem. & Schult.) T.Anderson, accepted as Justicia divaricata Licht. ex Roem. & Schult. indigenous
- Justicia divaricata Licht. ex Roem. & Schult. indigenous
- Justicia dregei J.C.Manning & Goldblatt, indigenous
- Justicia exigua S.Moore, indigenous
- Justicia fasciata (Nees) T.Anderson, accepted as Justicia flava (Vahl) Vahl, indigenous
- Justicia flava (Vahl) Vahl, indigenous
- Justicia genistifolia Engl. subsp. australe (P.G.Mey.) J.C.Manning & Goldblatt, accepted as Justicia australis (P.G.Mey.) Vollesen, indigenous
- Justicia glabra K.D.Koenig ex Roxb. accepted as Justicia scandens Vahl, indigenous
- Justicia guerkeana Schinz, indigenous
- Justicia heterocarpa T.Anderson, indigenous
  - Justicia heterocarpa T.Anderson subsp. dinteri (S.Moore) Hedren, indigenous
- Justicia heterostegia E.Mey. accepted as Dicliptera heterostegia Nees
- Justicia incana (Nees) T.Anderson, indigenous
- Justicia incerta C.B.Clarke, accepted as Justicia petiolaris (Nees) T.Anderson subsp. petiolaris, indigenous
- Justicia intercepta E.Mey. accepted as Isoglossa ciliata (Nees) Engl. indigenous
- Justicia karroica J.C.Manning & Goldblatt, endemic
- Justicia kraussii C.B.Clarke, accepted as Justicia protracta (Nees) T.Anderson, indigenous
  - Justicia kraussii C.B.Clarke var. florida C.B.Clarke, accepted as Justicia protracta (Nees) T.Anderson, indigenous
- Justicia leptantha (Nees) Lindau, accepted as Justicia tubulosa (E.Mey. ex Nees) T.Anderson subsp. tubulosa, indigenous
  - Justicia leptantha (Nees) Lindau subsp. late-ovata (C.B.Clarke) J.C.Manning & Goldblatt, accepted as Justicia tubulosa (E.Mey. ex Nees) T.Anderson subsp. late-ovata (C.B.Clarke) J.C.Manning & Goldblatt, indigenous
- Justicia leucoderme Schinz, indigenous
- Justicia ligulata Lam. accepted as Dicliptera paniculata (Forssk.) I.Darbysh.
- Justicia linifolia (Lindau) J.C.Manning & Goldblatt, accepted as Justicia linifolia (Lindau) V.A.W.Graham, indigenous
- Justicia linifolia (Lindau) V.A.W.Graham, indigenous
- Justicia lycioides Schinz, accepted as Justicia odora (Forssk.) Lam.
- Justicia malabarica (L.f.) Aiton, accepted as Dicliptera paniculata (Forssk.) I.Darbysh.
- Justicia matammensis (Schweinf.) Oliv. indigenous
- Justicia minima A.Meeuse, endemic
- Justicia montis-salinarum A.Meeuse, endemic
- Justicia namaensis Schinz, accepted as Justicia divaricata Licht. ex Roem. & Schult.
- Justicia natalensis (Nees) T.Anderson, endemic
- Justicia nepeta S.Moore, accepted as Justicia divaricata Licht. ex Roem. & Schult.
- Justicia nkandlaensis (Immelman) J.C.Manning & Goldblatt, endemic
- Justicia odora (Forssk.) Lam. indigenous
- Justicia orchioides L.f. endemic
  - Justicia orchioides L.f. subsp. glabrata Immelman, endemic
  - Justicia orchioides L.f. subsp. orchioides, endemic
- Justicia ovata E.Mey. accepted as Isoglossa ovata (Nees) Lindau, indigenous
- Justicia pallidior (Nees) C.B.Clarke, accepted as Justicia betonica L. indigenous
  - Justicia pallidior (Nees) C.B.Clarke var. cooperi C.B.Clarke, accepted as Justicia betonica L. indigenous
- Justicia palustris (Hochst.) T.Anderson var. dispersa Lindau, accepted as Justicia flava (Vahl) Vahl
- Justicia petiolaris (Nees) T.Anderson, indigenous
  - Justicia petiolaris (Nees) T.Anderson subsp. bowiei (C.B.Clarke) Immelman, endemic
  - Justicia petiolaris (Nees) T.Anderson subsp. incerta (C.B.Clarke) Immelman, accepted as Justicia petiolaris (Nees) T.Anderson subsp. petiolaris, endemic
  - Justicia petiolaris (Nees) T.Anderson subsp. petiolaris, indigenous
- Justicia polymorpha Schinz, accepted as Justicia odora (Forssk.) Lam.
- Justicia prolifera C.Presl, accepted as Isoglossa prolixa (Nees) Lindau, indigenous
- Justicia prolixa E.Mey. accepted as Isoglossa prolixa (Nees) Lindau, indigenous
- Justicia protracta (Nees) T.Anderson, indigenous
  - Justicia protracta (Nees) T.Anderson subsp. rhodesiana (S.Moore) Immelman, accepted as Justicia rhodesiana S.Moore, indigenous
- Justicia psammophila Mildbr. accepted as Justicia anagalloides (Nees) T.Anderson
- Justicia puberula Immelman, endemic
- Justicia pulegioides C.B.Clarke, accepted as Justicia protracta (Nees) T.Anderson, indigenous
  - Justicia pulegioides C.B.Clarke subsp. late-ovata C.B.Clarke, accepted as Justicia tubulosa (E.Mey. ex Nees) T.Anderson subsp. late-ovata (C.B.Clarke) J.C.Manning & Goldblatt, indigenous
- Justicia rhodesiana S.Moore, indigenous
- Justicia saxatilis (Munday) J.C.Manning & Goldblatt, endemic
- Justicia scandens Vahl, indigenous
- Justicia spartioides T.Anderson, indigenous
- Justicia thymifolia (Nees) C.B.Clarke, endemic
- Justicia tubulosa (E.Mey. ex Nees) T.Anderson, endemic
  - Justicia tubulosa (E.Mey. ex Nees) T.Anderson subsp. late-ovata (C.B.Clarke) J.C.Manning & Goldblatt, endemic
  - Justicia tubulosa (E.Mey. ex Nees) T.Anderson subsp. tubulosa, endemic
- Justicia umbellata Vahl, accepted as Dicliptera verticillata (Forssk.) C.Chr.
- Justicia uncinulata Oliv. accepted as Justicia anagalloides (Nees) T.Anderson
- Justicia uninervis S.Moore, accepted as Justicia betonica L. indigenous
- Justicia woodii C.B.Clarke, accepted as Justicia protracta (Nees) T.Anderson, indigenous

== Lepidagathis ==
Genus Lepidagathis:

- Lepidagathis scabra C.B.Clarke, indigenous
- Lepidagathis terminalis Hochst. ex Nees, accepted as Lepidagathis scariosa Nees

== Leptostachya ==
Genus Leptostachya:

- Leptostachya campylostemon Nees, accepted as Justicia campylostemon (Nees) T.Anderson, indigenous

== Mackaya ==
Genus Mackaya:

- Mackaya bella Harv. indigenous

== Macrorungia ==
Genus Macrorungia:

- Macrorungia formosissima (Klotzsch) C.B.Clarke, accepted as Anisotes formosissimus (Klotzsch) Milne-Redh.
- Macrorungia galpinii Baden, accepted as Metarungia galpinii (Baden) Baden
- Macrorungia longistrobus C.B.Clarke, accepted as Metarungia longistrobus (C.B.Clarke) Baden

== Megalochlamys ==
Genus Megalochlamys:

- Megalochlamys hamata (Klotzsch) Vollesen, indigenous
- Megalochlamys kenyensis Vollesen, indigenous
- Megalochlamys kenyensis Vollesen subsp. australis Vollesen, endemic
- Megalochlamys revoluta (Lindau) Vollesen, indigenous
  - Megalochlamys revoluta (Lindau) Vollesen subsp. cognata (N.E.Br.) Vollesen, indigenous

== Metarungia ==
Genus Metarungia:

- Metarungia galpinii (Baden) Baden, endemic
- Metarungia longistrobus (C.B.Clarke) Baden, indigenous
- Metarungia pubinervia (T.Anderson) Baden, indigenous

== Monechma ==
Genus Monechma:

- Monechma acutum C.B.Clarke, endemic
- Monechma affine Hochst. accepted as Justicia debilis (Forssk.) Vahl
- Monechma angustifolium Nees, accepted as Justicia bracteata (Hochst.) Zarb, indigenous
- Monechma angustissimum S.Moore, accepted as Justicia divaricata Licht. ex Roem. & Schult. indigenous
- Monechma atherstonei (T.Anderson) C.B.Clarke, accepted as Justicia spartioides T.Anderson, indigenous
- Monechma australe P.G.Mey. accepted as Justicia australis (P.G.Mey.) Vollesen, indigenous
- Monechma bracteatum Hochst. accepted as Justicia bracteata (Hochst.) Zarb, indigenous
  - Monechma bracteatum Hochst. var. angustifolium (Nees) C.B.Clarke, accepted as Justicia bracteata (Hochst.) Zarb
- Monechma clarkei Schinz, accepted as Justicia guerkeana Schinz
- Monechma crassiusculum P.G.Mey. accepted as Justicia crassiuscula (P.G.Mey.) J.C.Manning & Goldblatt, indigenous
- Monechma debile (Forssk.) Nees, accepted as Justicia debilis (Forssk.) Vahl, indigenous
- Monechma distichotrichum (Lindau) P.G.Mey. accepted as Justicia distichotricha Lindau, indigenous
- Monechma divaricatum (Licht. ex Roem. & Schult.) C.B.Clarke, accepted as Justicia divaricata Licht. ex Roem. & Schult. indigenous
- Monechma eremum S.Moore, accepted as Justicia divaricata Licht. ex Roem. & Schult.
- Monechma fimbriatum C.B.Clarke, accepted as Justicia divaricata Licht. ex Roem. & Schult. indigenous
- Monechma foliosum C.B.Clarke, endemic
- Monechma genistifolium (Engl.) C.B.Clarke subsp. australe (P.G.Mey.) Munday, accepted as Justicia australis (P.G.Mey.) Vollesen, indigenous
- Monechma incanum (Nees) C.B.Clarke, accepted as Justicia incana (Nees) T.Anderson, indigenous
- Monechma leucoderme (Schinz) C.B.Clarke, accepted as Justicia leucoderme Schinz, indigenous
- Monechma linaria C.B.Clarke, endemic
- Monechma molle C.B.Clarke, accepted as Justicia dregei J.C.Manning & Goldblatt, indigenous
- Monechma mollissimum (Nees) P.G.Mey. accepted as Justicia dregei J.C.Manning & Goldblatt, indigenous
- Monechma monechmoides (S.Moore) Hutch. accepted as Justicia monechmoides S.Moore, indigenous
- Monechma namaense (Schinz) C.B.Clarke, accepted as Justicia divaricata Licht. ex Roem. & Schult.
- Monechma nepeta (S.Moore) C.B.Clarke, accepted as Justicia divaricata Licht. ex Roem. & Schult.
- Monechma nepetoides C.B.Clarke, accepted as Justicia divaricata Licht. ex Roem. & Schult. indigenous
- Monechma pseudopatulum C.B.Clarke, accepted as Justicia spartioides T.Anderson, indigenous
  - Monechma pseudopatulum C.B.Clarke var. latifolium C.B.Clarke, accepted as Justicia spartioides T.Anderson, indigenous
- Monechma robustum Bond, accepted as Justicia karroica J.C.Manning & Goldblatt, endemic
- Monechma saxatile Munday, accepted as Justicia saxatilis (Munday) J.C.Manning & Goldblatt, endemic
- Monechma spartioides (T.Anderson) C.B.Clarke, accepted as Justicia spartioides T.Anderson, indigenous
- Monechma terminale S.Moore, accepted as Justicia divaricata Licht. ex Roem. & Schult. indigenous

== Neuracanthus ==
Genus Neuracanthus:

- Neuracanthus africanus T.Anderson ex S.Moore, indigenous
  - Neuracanthus africanus T.Anderson ex S.Moore var. limpopoensis Bidgood & Brummitt, accepted as Neuracanthus africanus T.Anderson ex S.Moore, indigenous

== Nomaphila ==
Genus Nomaphila:

- Nomaphila gracillima Schinz, accepted as Hygrophila gracillima (Schinz) Burkill
- Nomaphila quadrangularis Klotzsch, accepted as Duosperma quadrangulare (Klotzsch) Brummitt

== Odontonema ==
Genus Odontonema:

- Odontonema cuspidatum (Nees) Kuntze, not indigenous, cultivated, naturalised, invasive

== Peristrophe ==
Genus Peristrophe:

- Peristrophe caulopsila E.Mey. ex Nees, accepted as Dicliptera cernua (Hook.f. ex Nees) J.C.Manning & Goldblatt, indigenous
- Peristrophe cernua Hook.f. ex Nees, accepted as Dicliptera cernua (Hook.f. ex Nees) J.C.Manning & Goldblatt, endemic
- Peristrophe cliffordii K.Balkwill, accepted as Dicliptera cliffordii (K.Balkwill) J.C.Manning & Goldblatt, indigenous
- Peristrophe decorticans K.Balkwill, accepted as Dicliptera decorticans (K.Balkwill) I.Darbysh. indigenous
- Peristrophe doriae Terraccino, accepted as Dicliptera paniculata (Forssk.) I.Darbysh.
- Peristrophe gillilandiorum K.Balkwill, accepted as Dicliptera gillilandiorum (K.Balkwill) I.Darbysh. indigenous
- Peristrophe kotschyana Nees, accepted as Dicliptera paniculata (Forssk.) I.Darbysh.
- Peristrophe krebsii C.Presl, accepted as Dicliptera cernua (Hook.f. ex Nees) J.C.Manning & Goldblatt, indigenous
- Peristrophe natalensis T.Anderson, accepted as Dicliptera cernua (Hook.f. ex Nees) J.C.Manning & Goldblatt, indigenous
- Peristrophe oblonga Nees, accepted as Dicliptera cernua (Hook.f. ex Nees) J.C.Manning & Goldblatt, indigenous
- Peristrophe paniculata (Forssk.) Brummitt, accepted as Dicliptera paniculata (Forssk.) I.Darbysh.
- Peristrophe pilosa Turrill, accepted as Dicliptera paniculata (Forssk.) I.Darbysh.
- Peristrophe transvaalensis (C.B.Clarke) K.Balkwill, accepted as Dicliptera transvaalensis C.B.Clarke, indigenous

== Petalidium ==
Genus Petalidium:

- Petalidium aromaticum Oberm. indigenous
  - Petalidium aromaticum Oberm. var. aromaticum, indigenous
  - Petalidium aromaticum Oberm. var. canescens Oberm. indigenous
- Petalidium damarense S.Moore, accepted as Petalidium variabile (Engl.) C.B.Clarke var. variabile
- Petalidium eenii S.Moore, accepted as Petalidium canescens (Engl.) C.B.Clarke
- Petalidium eurychlamys Mildbr. accepted as Petalidium englerianum (Schinz) C.B.Clarke
- Petalidium glutinosum (Engl.) C.B.Clarke, accepted as Petalidium variabile (Engl.) C.B.Clarke var. variabile
- Petalidium incanum (Engl.) Mildbr. accepted as Petalidium variabile (Engl.) C.B.Clarke var. variabile
- Petalidium latifolium (Schinz) C.B.Clarke, accepted as Petalidium englerianum (Schinz) C.B.Clarke
- Petalidium lucens Oberm. indigenous
- Petalidium oblongifolium C.B.Clarke, endemic
- Petalidium ovatum (Schinz) C.B.Clarke, accepted as Petalidium englerianum (Schinz) C.B.Clarke
- Petalidium parvifolium C.B.Clarke ex Schinz, indigenous
  - Petalidium parvifolium C.B.Clarke ex Schinz var. angustifolia Schinz, accepted as Petalidium linifolium T.Anderson
- Petalidium rubescens Oberm. accepted as Petalidium coccineum S.Moore
- Petalidium setosum C.B.Clarke ex Schinz, indigenous
- Petalidium wilmaniae Oberm. accepted as Petalidium parvifolium C.B.Clarke ex Schinz

== Phaulopsis ==
Genus Phaulopsis:

- Phaulopsis imbricata (Forssk.) Sweet, indigenous
  - Phaulopsis imbricata (Forssk.) Sweet subsp. imbricata, indigenous
- Phaulopsis longifolia Thomson ex C.B.Clarke, accepted as Phaulopsis imbricata (Forssk.) Sweet subsp. imbricata, present

== Pseuderanthemum ==
Genus Pseuderanthemum:

- Pseuderanthemum hildebrandtii Lindau, indigenous
- Pseuderanthemum subviscosum (C.B.Clarke) Stapf, indigenous

== Pseudobarleria ==
Genus Pseudobarleria:

- Pseudobarleria canescens Engl. accepted as Petalidium canescens (Engl.) C.B.Clarke
- Pseudobarleria coccinea (S.Moore) Lindau, accepted as Petalidium coccineum S.Moore
- Pseudobarleria engleriana Schinz, accepted as Petalidium englerianum (Schinz) C.B.Clarke
- Pseudobarleria glandulifera Lindau, accepted as Petalidium rautanenii Schinz
- Pseudobarleria lanata Engl. accepted as Petalidium lanatum (Engl.) C.B.Clarke
- Pseudobarleria linifolia (T.Anderson) Lindau, accepted as Petalidium linifolium T.Anderson
- Pseudobarleria variabilis Engl. accepted as Petalidium variabile (Engl.) C.B.Clarke var. variabile
  - Pseudobarleria variabilis Engl. var. incana Engl. accepted as Petalidium variabile (Engl.) C.B.Clarke var. variabile
  - Pseudobarleria variabilis Engl. var. viridescens Engl. accepted as Petalidium variabile (Engl.) C.B.Clarke var. variabile

== Rhaphidospora ==
Genus Rhaphidospora:

- Rhaphidospora glabra (J.Konig ex Roxb.) Nees, accepted as Justicia scandens Vahl, indigenous

== Rhinacanthus ==
Genus Rhinacanthus:

- Rhinacanthus communis C.B.Clarke, accepted as Rhinacanthus gracilis Klotzsch var. gracilis
- Rhinacanthus gracilis Klotzsch, indigenous
  - Rhinacanthus gracilis Klotzsch var. gracilis, indigenous
  - Rhinacanthus gracilis Klotzsch var. latilabiatus K.Balkwill, endemic
- Rhinacanthus xerophilus A.Meeuse, indigenous

== Rhytiglossa ==
Genus Rhytiglossa:

- Rhytiglossa ciliata Nees, accepted as Isoglossa ciliata (Nees) Engl. indigenous
- Rhytiglossa eckloniana Nees, accepted as Isoglossa origanoides (Nees) S.Moore, indigenous
- Rhytiglossa glandulosa Hochst. accepted as Isoglossa woodii C.B.Clarke
- Rhytiglossa origanoides Nees, accepted as Isoglossa origanoides (Nees) S.Moore, indigenous
- Rhytiglossa ovata Nees, accepted as Isoglossa ovata (Nees) Lindau, indigenous
- Rhytiglossa prolixa Nees, accepted as Isoglossa prolixa (Nees) Lindau, indigenous

== Ruellia ==
Genus Ruellia:

- Ruellia adhaerens Forssk. accepted as Priva adhaerens (Forssk.) Chiov. indigenous
- Ruellia baurii C.B.Clarke, endemic
- Ruellia ciliaris Pers. accepted as Ruellia cordata Thunb. indigenous
- Ruellia cordata Thunb. indigenous
- Ruellia depressa L. accepted as Dyschoriste depressa (L.) Nees
- Ruellia depressa L.f. accepted as Dyschoriste depressa (L.) Nees
- Ruellia gongodes Lindau, accepted as Ruellia patula Jacq.
- Ruellia imbricata Forssk. accepted as Phaulopsis imbricata (Forssk.) Sweet subsp. imbricata
- Ruellia malacophylla C.B.Clarke, indigenous
- Ruellia marlothii Engl. accepted as Ruellia diversifolia S.Moore
- Ruellia mysorensis Roth, accepted as Asystasia mysorensis (Roth) T.Anderson, indigenous
- Ruellia otaviensis P.G.Mey. accepted as Ruellia prostrata Poir. indigenous
- Ruellia ovata Thunb. accepted as Ruellia cordata Thunb. indigenous
- Ruellia ovata Thunb. accepted as Ruellia pilosa L.f. indigenous
- Ruellia patula Jacq. indigenous
- Ruellia pilosa L.f. endemic
- Ruellia prostrata Poir. indigenous
- Ruellia radicans Hochst. ex A.Rich. accepted as Dyschoriste radicans (Hochst. ex A.Rich.) Nees
- Ruellia setigera Pers. accepted as Dyschoriste setigera (Pers.) J.C.Manning & Goldblatt, indigenous
- Ruellia simplex C.Wright, not indigenous, cultivated, naturalised, invasive
- Ruellia stenophylla C.B.Clarke, indigenous
- Ruellia velutina (Schinz) E.Phillips, accepted as Ruellia diversifolia S.Moore
- Ruellia woodii C.B.Clarke, endemic
- Ruellia zeyheri (Sond.) T.Anderson, accepted as Ruellia pilosa L.f.

== Ruelliopsis ==
Genus Ruelliopsis:

- Ruelliopsis setosa (Nees) C.B.Clarke, indigenous

== Rungia ==
Genus Rungia:

- Rungia pubinervia T.Anderson, accepted as Metarungia pubinervia (T.Anderson) Baden

== Ruspolia ==
Genus Ruspolia:

- Ruspolia hypocrateriformis (Vahl) Milne-Redh. indigenous
  - Ruspolia hypocrateriformis (Vahl) Milne-Redh. var. australis Milne-Redh. indigenous

== Ruttya ==
Genus Ruttya:

- Ruttya ovata Harv. indigenous

== Salpinctium ==
Genus Salpinctium:

- Salpinctium natalense (C.B.Clarke) T.J.Edwards, endemic
- Salpinctium stenosiphon (C.B.Clarke) T.J.Edwards, endemic

== Sclerochiton ==
Genus Sclerochiton:

- Sclerochiton apiculatus Vollesen, indigenous
- Sclerochiton harveyanus Nees, indigenous
- Sclerochiton ilicifolius A.Meeuse, indigenous
- Sclerochiton odoratissimus Hilliard, endemic
- Sclerochiton triacanthus A.Meeuse, endemic

== Siphonoglossa ==
Genus Siphonoglossa:

- Siphonoglossa leptantha (Nees) Immelman, accepted as Justicia tubulosa (E.Mey. ex Nees) T.Anderson subsp. tubulosa, indigenous
  - Siphonoglossa leptantha (Nees) Immelman subsp. late-ovata (C.B.Clarke) Immelman, accepted as Justicia tubulosa (E.Mey. ex Nees) T.Anderson subsp. late-ovata (C.B.Clarke) J.C.Manning & Goldblatt, endemic
- Siphonoglossa linifolia (Lindau) C.B.Clarke, accepted as Justicia linifolia (Lindau) V.A.W.Graham, indigenous
- Siphonoglossa nkandlaensis Immelman, accepted as Justicia nkandlaensis (Immelman) J.C.Manning & Goldblatt, endemic

== Synnema ==
Genus Synnema:

- Synnema acinos S.Moore, accepted as Hygrophila acinos (S.Moore) Heine
- Synnema angolense S.Moore, accepted as Hygrophila angolensis (S.Moore) Heine

== Thunbergia ==
Genus Thunbergia:

- Thunbergia alata Bojer ex Sims, indigenous
- Thunbergia amoena C.B.Clarke, endemic
- Thunbergia aspera Nees, accepted as Thunbergia atriplicifolia E.Mey. ex Nees
- Thunbergia atriplicifolia E.Mey. ex Nees, indigenous
- Thunbergia aurea N.E.Br. indigenous
- Thunbergia bachmannii Lindau, accepted as Thunbergia atriplicifolia E.Mey. ex Nees
- Thunbergia capensis Retz. endemic
- Thunbergia cordibracteolata C.B.Clarke, accepted as Thunbergia atriplicifolia E.Mey. ex Nees
- Thunbergia dregeana Nees, indigenous
- Thunbergia galpinii Lindau, accepted as Thunbergia atriplicifolia E.Mey. ex Nees
- Thunbergia grandiflora (Roxb. ex Rottler) Roxb. not indigenous, cultivated, naturalised, invasive
- Thunbergia hirtistyla C.B.Clarke, accepted as Thunbergia atriplicifolia E.Mey. ex Nees
- Thunbergia natalensis Hook. indigenous
- Thunbergia neglecta Sond. indigenous
- Thunbergia pondoensis Lindau, indigenous
- Thunbergia purpurata Harv. ex C.B.Clarke, endemic
- Thunbergia venosa C.B.Clarke, endemic
- Thunbergia xanthotricha Lindau, accepted as Thunbergia atriplicifolia E.Mey. ex Nees
