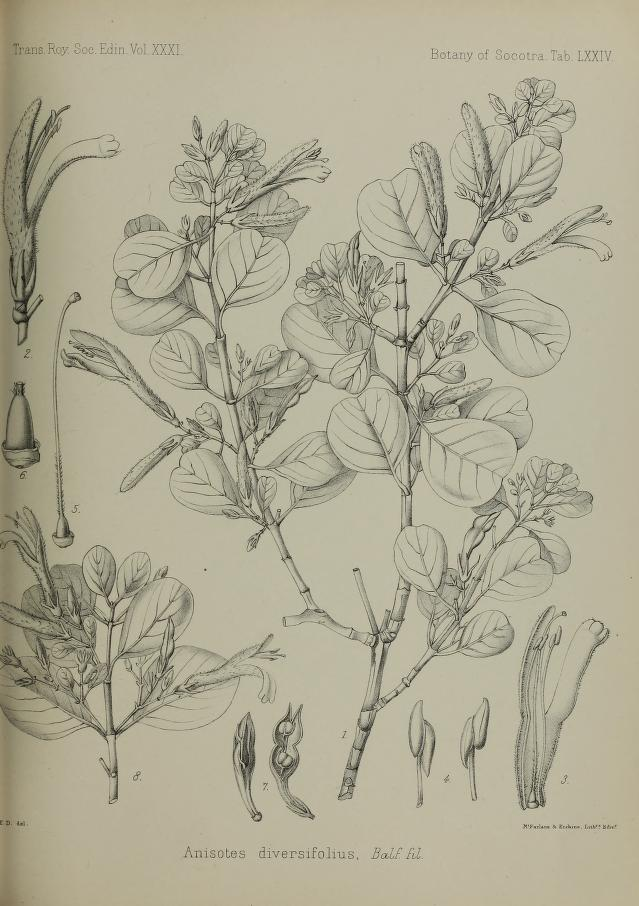
- Botanical drawing, 1888

Conservation status
- Least Concern (IUCN 3.1)

Scientific classification
- Kingdom: Plantae
- Clade: Tracheophytes
- Clade: Angiosperms
- Clade: Eudicots
- Clade: Asterids
- Order: Lamiales
- Family: Acanthaceae
- Genus: Anisotes
- Species: A. diversifolius

Binomial name
- Anisotes diversifolius Balf.f.

= Anisotes diversifolius =

Species of plant

Anisotes diversifolius is a species of plant in the family Acanthaceae. It is endemic to Socotra (Yemen). Its natural habitats are subtropical or tropical dry forests and rocky areas.
