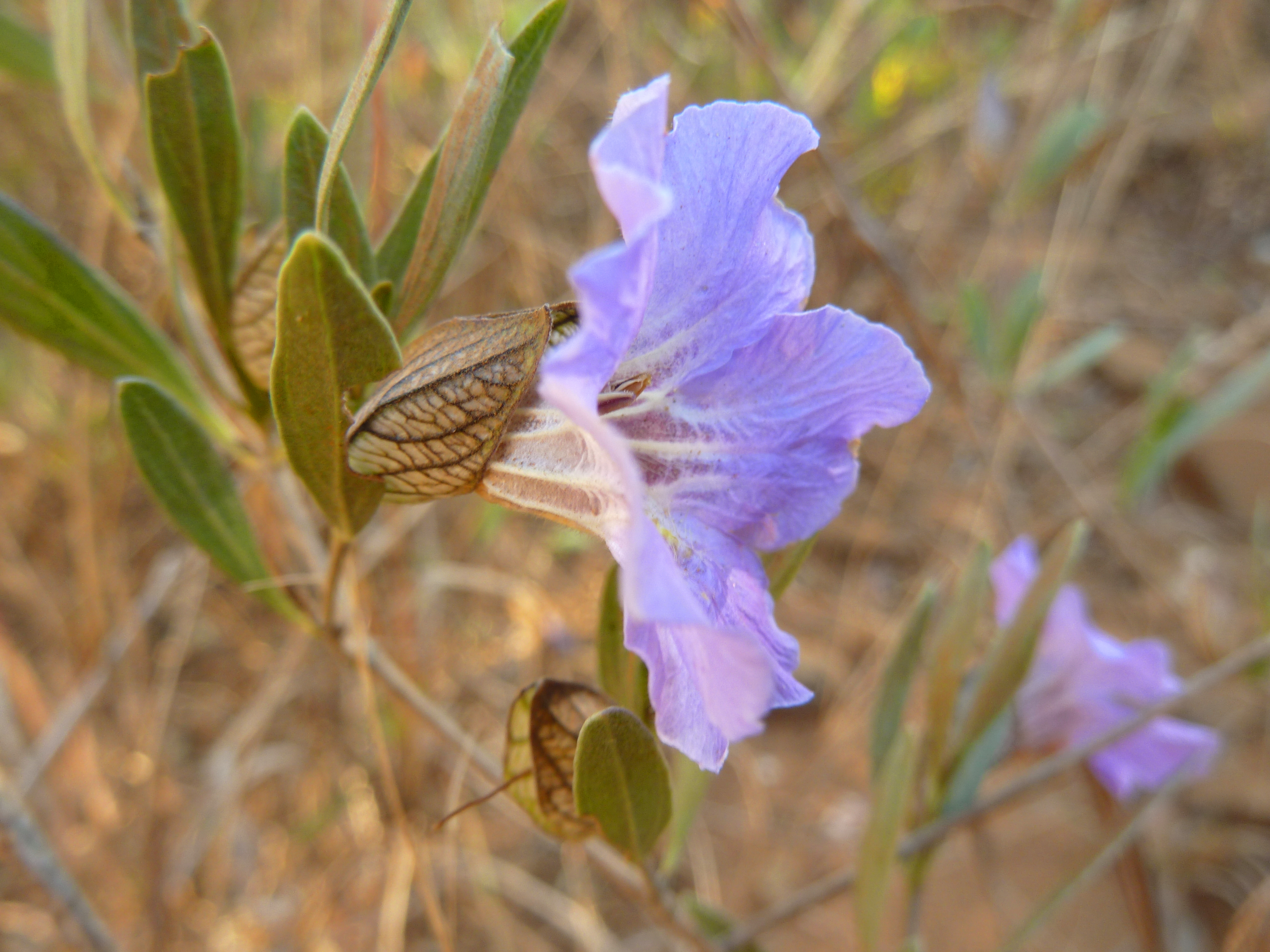
- P. oblongifolium flower with veined, cuspate bracteoles

Scientific classification
- Kingdom: Plantae
- Clade: Tracheophytes
- Clade: Angiosperms
- Clade: Eudicots
- Clade: Asterids
- Order: Lamiales
- Family: Acanthaceae
- Subfamily: Acanthoideae
- Tribe: Ruellieae
- Genus: Petalidium; Nees (1832)

Synonyms
- Pseudobarleria T.Anderson (1863), nom. illeg.

= Petalidium =

Petal-bushes

Genus of plants

Petalidium, commonly known as petal-bushes, is a genus of perennial shrubs in the acanthus family. They are native to sandy flats or stony slopes in the drier bush regions of Africa, India and the Mascarene Islands. The majority of species occur in frost-free, summer rainfall regions of southern Africa, and may be found from low to medium altitudes.

== Description ==
They have a diverse habit, forming either small, scrambling herbs or large, robust shrubs. Their dilated, tubular flowers are solitary or on short racemes growing from the leaf axils, and vary from white to mauve or red in colour. The four stamens are partially fused with the corolla, and the style is branched into two unequal parts. The calyx is deeply divided into five segments.

Two large, ovate to elliptic bracteoles subtend and protect the young corolla. The persistent bracteoles may be conspicuously veined or covered by long, villous trichomes. The small, ellipsoid fruit capsules explosively release two to four flat seeds (two ovules per ovary cell) when moisture is absorbed by their hygroscopic hairs. Young foliage and branches are covered in gland-tipped hairs. The leaves are entire.

== Cultivation ==
Some species are cultivated as ornamentals, as they grow fast and flower profusely.

== Etymology ==
According to Jackson (1990), the name Petalidium is derived from the Greek petalon (a leaf or petal), which may refer to the deciduous, leaf-like bracts, while bracteatum likewise refers to the large, imbricate (i.e. overlapping) bracts.

== Species ==
There are 41 species in all, of which 29 occur in southern Africa. The species include:

- Petalidium angustitubum P.G.Mey.
- Petalidium aromaticum Oberm. – n South Africa, s Zimbabwe
- Petalidium barlerioides (Roth) Nees
- Petalidium bracteatum Oberm. – s Angola?, n & c Namibia
- Petalidium canescens (Engl.) C.B.Clarke
- Petalidium cirrhiferum S.Moore
- Petalidium coccineum S.Moore – nw Namibia
- Petalidium crispum A. Meeuse ex P.G. Mey.
- Petalidium currorii S.Moore – Angola
- Petalidium cymbiforme Schinz
- Petalidium elatum Benoist
- Petalidium englerianum (Schinz) C.B.Clarke
- Petalidium engoense - Angola, Namnibia
- Petalidium giessii P.G.Mey.
- Petalidium glandulosum S.Moore
- Petalidium gossweileri S.Moore
- Petalidium halimoides (Nees) S.Moore – Namibia
- Petalidium huillense C.B.Clarke
- Petalidium kaokoense Swanepoel – Namibia
- Petalidium lanatum C.B.Clarke
- Petalidium lepidagathis S.Moore
- Petalidium linifolium T.Anderson
- Petalidium lucens Oberm.
- Petalidium luteoalbum A.Meeuse
- Petalidium mannheimerae Swanepoel, Nanyeni & A.E.van Wyk
- Petalidium microtrichum Benoist
- Petalidium oblongifolium C.B.Clarke – South Africa
- Petalidium ohopohense P.G.Mey.
- Petalidium parvifolium Schinz
- Petalidium physaloides S.Moore – Namibia
- Petalidium pilosibracteolatum Merxm. & Hainz – Namibia
- Petalidium ramulosum Schinz
- Petalidium rautanenii Schinz
- Petalidium rossmannianum P.G.Mey.
- Petalidium rupestre S.Moore
- Petalidium setosum C.B.Clarke ex Schinz – n, c & s Namibia
- Petalidium spiniferum C.B.Clarke – Chella Mountains, Angola
- Petalidium subcrispum P.G.Mey.
- Petalidium tomentosum S.Moore
- Petalidium variabile (Engl.) C.B.Clarke
- Petalidium welwitschii S.Moore
