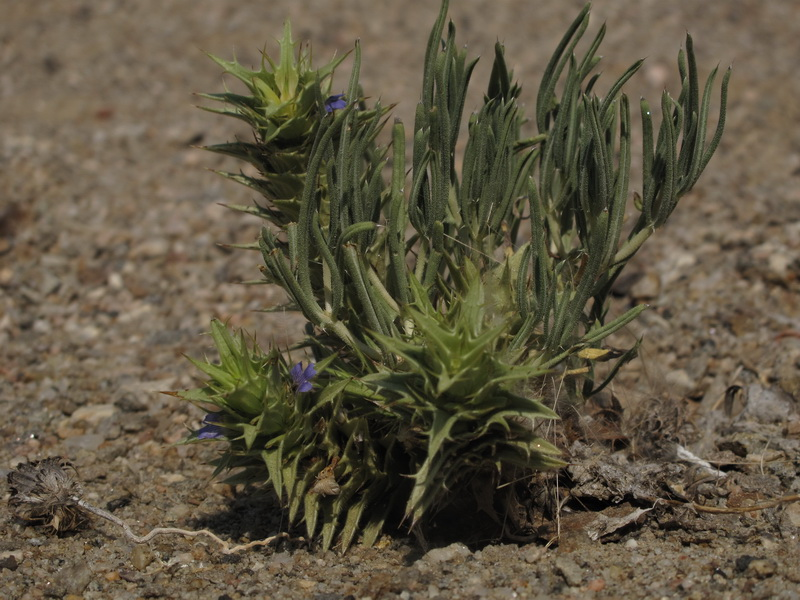

Scientific classification
- Kingdom: Plantae
- Clade: Embryophytes
- Clade: Tracheophytes
- Clade: Angiosperms
- Clade: Eudicots
- Clade: Asterids
- Order: Lamiales
- Family: Acanthaceae
- Genus: Blepharis
- Species: B. grossa

Binomial name
- Blepharis grossa T.Anderson

Synonyms
- Acanthodium grossum Nees; Blepharis dichotoma Engl.

= Blepharis grossa =

Species of flowering plant

Blepharis grossa is a species of plant in the family Acanthaceae native to Angola, Namibia, and the Cape Provinces.

== Taxonomy ==
It was first described in 1847 by Nees von Esenbeck as Acanthodium grossum. This was revised in 1863 by Thomas Anderson to Blepharis grossa.
