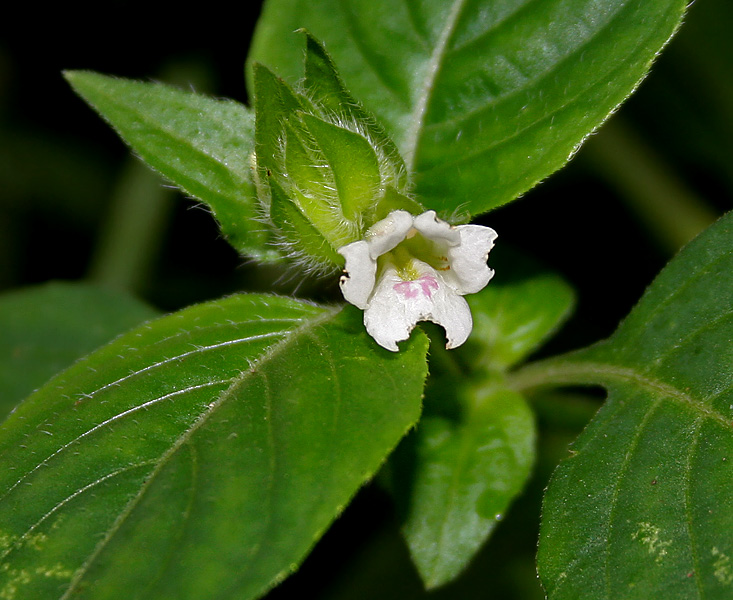
- at Ananthagiri Hills, in Rangareddy district of Andhra Pradesh, India.

Scientific classification
- Kingdom: Plantae
- Clade: Tracheophytes
- Clade: Angiosperms
- Clade: Eudicots
- Clade: Asterids
- Order: Lamiales
- Family: Acanthaceae
- Genus: Asystasia
- Species: A. mysorensis

Binomial name
- Asystasia mysorensis (Roth) T.Anderson

= Asystasia mysorensis =

Species of flowering plant

Asystasia mysorensis is an edible plant species in the family Acanthaceae found in Africa. It is used as a leafy vegetable, used by the Kikuyu community for food including the delicious 'mukimo'. The local name is 'muhika na ihuu'
