= Glossochilus =

Scientific classification
- Kingdom: Plantae
- Clade: Tracheophytes
- Clade: Angiosperms
- Clade: Eudicots
- Clade: Asterids
- Order: Lamiales
- Family: Acanthaceae
- Genus: Glossochilus; Nees (1847)
- Species: G. burchellii

Binomial name
- Glossochilus burchellii Nees (1847)

Genus of plants

Glossochilus burchellii is a species of flowering plant belonging to the family Acanthaceae. It is endemic to the Cape Provinces of South Africa. It is the sole species in genus Glossochilus.
