= Metarungia =

Scientific classification
- Kingdom: Plantae
- Clade: Tracheophytes
- Clade: Angiosperms
- Clade: Eudicots
- Clade: Asterids
- Order: Lamiales
- Family: Acanthaceae
- Subfamily: Acanthoideae
- Tribe: Justicieae
- Genus: Metarungia; Baden (1981)
- Species: M. galpinii

Binomial name
- Metarungia galpinii (Baden) Baden (1984)

Synonyms
- Macrorungia galpinii Baden (1981)

Genus of flowering plants

Metarungia galpinii is a species of flowering plant in the family Acanthaceae of dicotyledonous flowering plants. It is a shrub endemic to the Eastern Cape Province of South Africa. It is the sole species in genus Metarungia.

It has a large, colourful corolla, and is morphologically similar to Anisotes, which is also assumed to be bird-pollinated. It differs mainly in the dehiscence of the fruit capsule, and details of the placenta.
