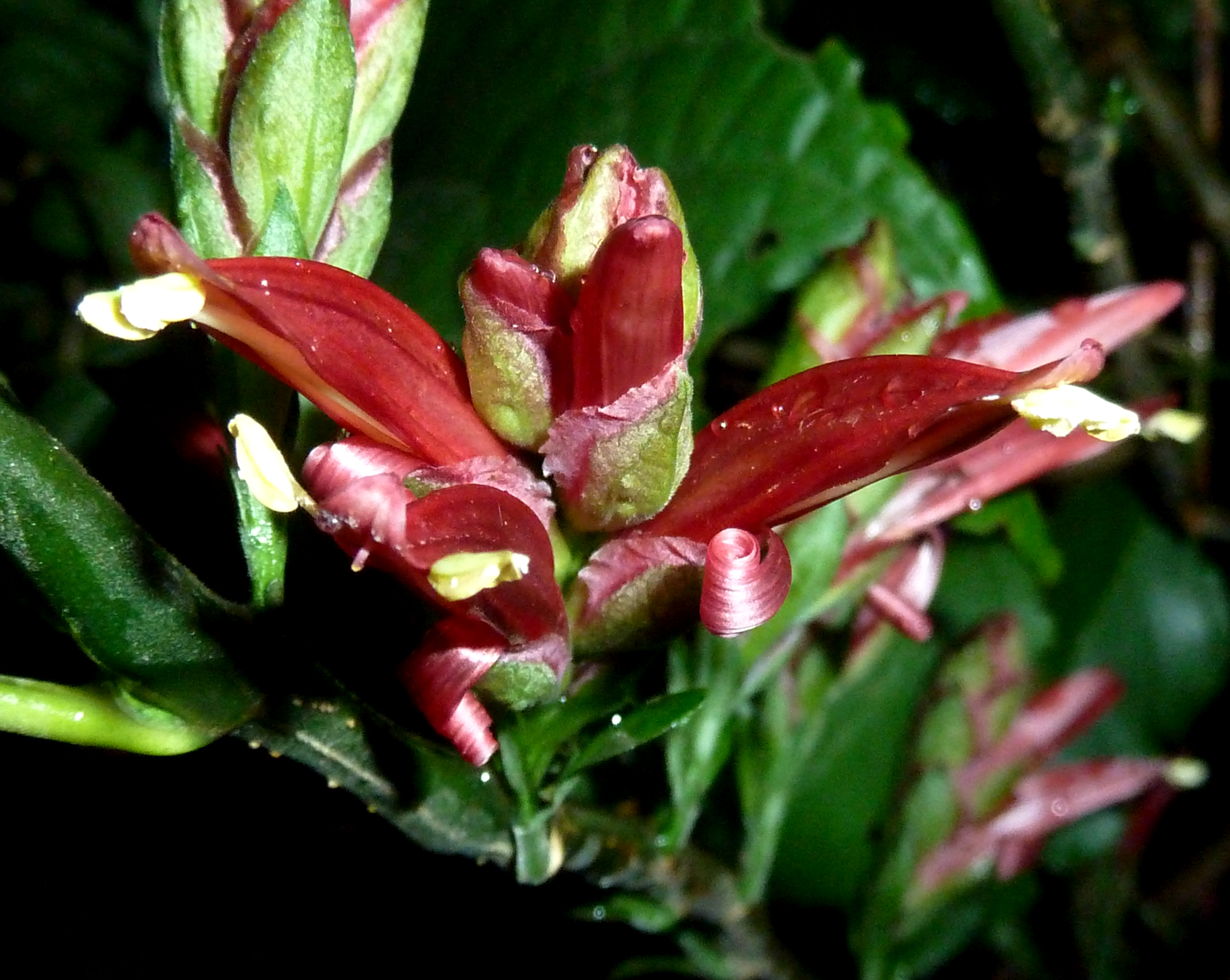
- Metarungia pubinervia (synonym of Anisotes pubinervius)

Scientific classification
- Kingdom: Plantae
- Clade: Tracheophytes
- Clade: Angiosperms
- Clade: Eudicots
- Clade: Asterids
- Order: Lamiales
- Family: Acanthaceae
- Subfamily: Acanthoideae
- Tribe: Justicieae
- Genus: Anisotes; Nees

Synonyms
- Calasias Raf.; Chlamydostachya Mildbr.; Danguya Benoist; Himantochilus T.Anderson

= Anisotes =

Genus of flowering plants

Anisotes is a genus of Afrotropical plants in the family Acanthaceae. The genus is morphologically similar to Metarungia, from which it differs mainly in the dehiscence of the fruit capsule, and the nature of the placenta. Placentas (with attached retinacula) remain attached to the inner surface of fruit capsules in Anisotes.

They favour sandy ground or tropical to subtropical dry forest. The corolla consists of a two-lipped flower that is orange to red in colour. Four seeds are produced in a woody fruit capsule. Two of the six Madagascar species, A. hygroscopicus and A. venosus, are unique in the genus in having hygroscopic trichomes on their seeds.

== Species ==
As of December 2023, Plants of the World Online accepted the following species:

- Anisotes bracteatus Milne-Redh. – southern Africa
- Anisotes comorensis (Lindau) T.F.Daniel
- Anisotes divaricatus T.F.Daniel, Mbola, Almeda & Phillipson – southwestern Madagascar
- Anisotes diversifolius Balf.f.
- Anisotes dumosus Milne-Redh.
- Anisotes galanae (Baden) Vollesen
- Anisotes guineensis Lindau
- Anisotes hygroscopicus T.F.Daniel – Madagascar
- Anisotes involucratus Fiori
- Anisotes longistrobus (C.B.Clarke) Vollesen
- Anisotes macrophyllus (Lindau) Heine
- Anisotes madagascariensis Benoist – southwestern Madagascar
- Anisotes mayottensis T.F.Daniel
- Anisotes nyassae Baden
- Anisotes parvifolius Oliv.
- Anisotes pubinervius (T.Anderson) Heine
- Anisotes pulchellus (Benoist) T.F.Daniel, Letsara & Rakotonas.
- Anisotes rogersii S.Moore – southern Africa
- Anisotes sessiliflorus (T.Anderson) C.B.Clarke
- Anisotes spectabilis (Mildbr.) Vollesen
- Anisotes subcoriaceus T.F.Daniel – Madagascar
- Anisotes tablensis T.F.Daniel
- Anisotes tanensis Baden
- Anisotes tangensis Baden
- Anisotes trisulcus (Forssk.) Nees
- Anisotes ukambensis Lindau
- Anisotes umbrosus Milne-Redh.
- Anisotes venosus T.F.Daniel – Madagascar
- Anisotes zenkeri (Lindau) C.B.Clarke
