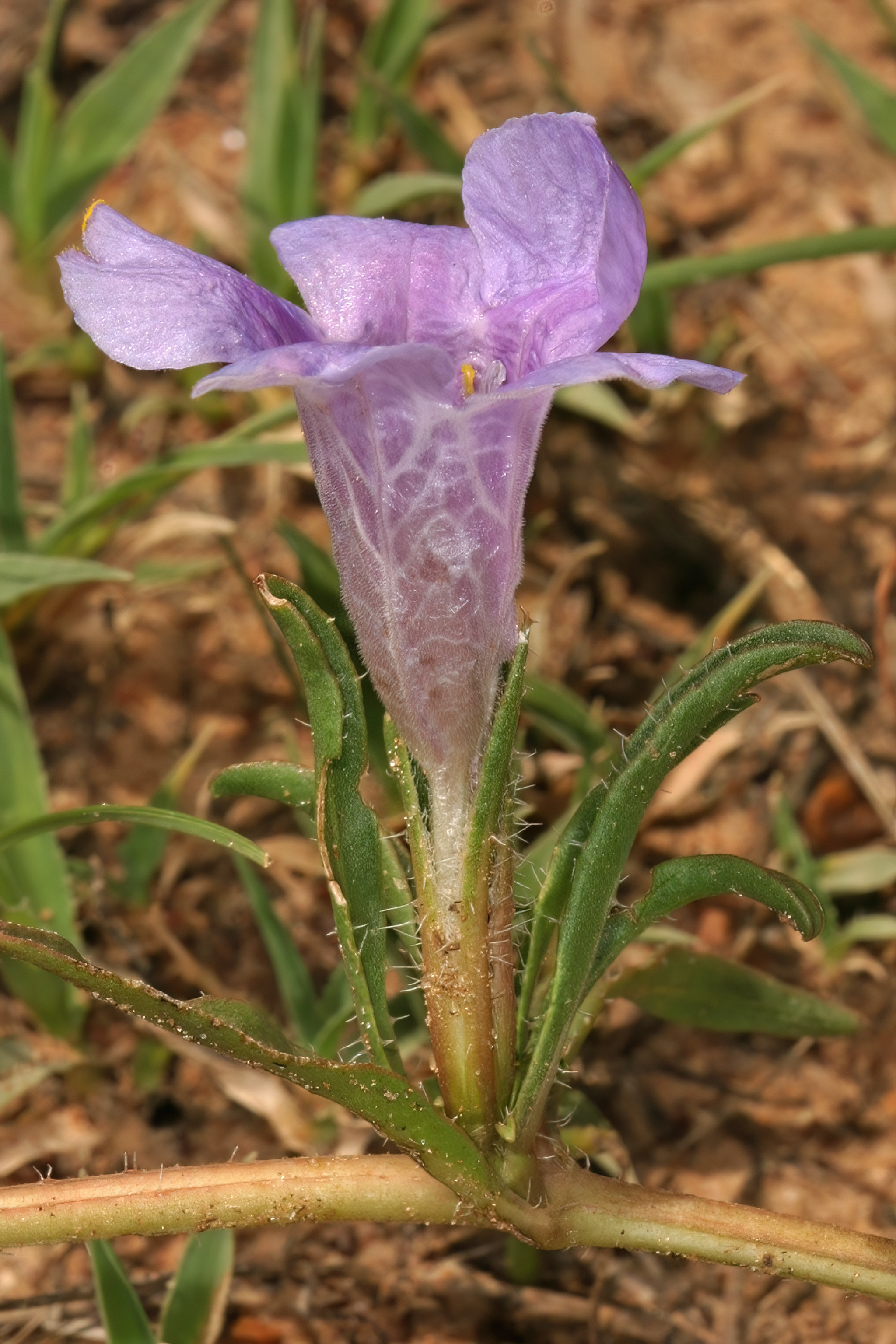
- Ruelliopsis setosa

Scientific classification
- Kingdom: Plantae
- Clade: Tracheophytes
- Clade: Angiosperms
- Clade: Eudicots
- Clade: Asterids
- Order: Lamiales
- Family: Acanthaceae
- Genus: Ruelliopsis; C.B.Clarke (1899)
- Species: R. setosa

Binomial name
- Ruelliopsis setosa (Nees) C.B.Clarke (1899)

Synonyms
- Calophanes setosus Nees (1847); Dyschoriste fleckii Schinz (1915); Dyschoriste setosa (Nees) Kuntze (1891); Ruelliopsis damarensis S.Moore (1907)

= Ruelliopsis =

Species of plant

Ruelliopsis is a monotypic genus of flowering plants belonging to the family Acanthaceae. It only contains one known species, Ruelliopsis setosa.

It is native to Zimbabwe, Botswana, and Namibia, and to the Cape Provinces, Free State, and Northern Provinces of South Africa.

The genus name of Ruelliopsis is in honour of Jean Ruel (1474–1537), a French herbalist and physician to Francis I of France and translator of several works of Dioscorides. The Latin specific epithet of setosa means bristly derived from setose.
