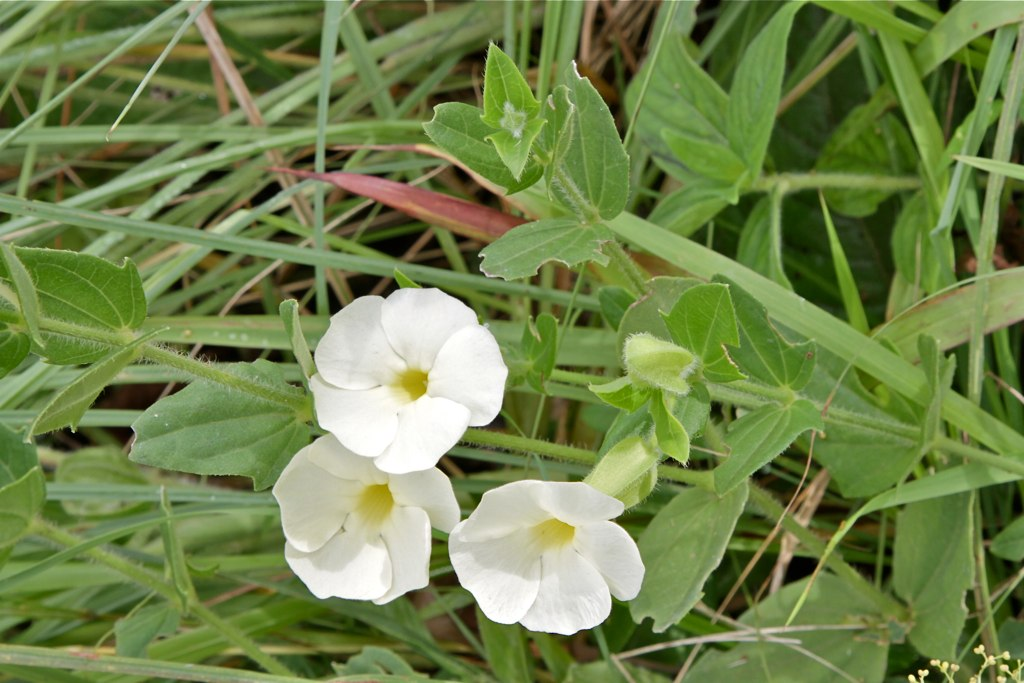
- Flowers

Conservation status
- Least Concern (IUCN 3.1)

Scientific classification
- Kingdom: Plantae
- Clade: Embryophytes
- Clade: Tracheophytes
- Clade: Angiosperms
- Clade: Eudicots
- Clade: Asterids
- Order: Lamiales
- Family: Acanthaceae
- Genus: Thunbergia
- Species: T. atriplicifolia

Binomial name
- Thunbergia atriplicifolia E.Mey. ex Nees (1847)

Synonyms
- List: Thunbergia aspera Nees; Thunbergia bachmannii Lindau; Thunbergia baurii Lindau; Thunbergia cordibracteolata C.B.Clarke; Thunbergia flavohirta Lindau; Thunbergia galpinii Lindau; Thunbergia hirtistyla C.B.Clarke; Thunbergia xanthotricha Lindau

= Thunbergia atriplicifolia =

Species of flowering plant

Thunbergia atriplicifolia, the Natal primrose, is a species of flowering plant in the family Acanthaceae, native to South Africa and Eswatini. It is a favored browse of the steenbok (Raphicerus campestris).

== Etymology ==
The genus name Thunbergia is named for Swedish naturalist Carl Thunberg, the father of South African botany. The adjective atriplicifolia is derived from the Latin, meaning that its foliage is similar to that of members of the Atriplex genus.

== Description ==
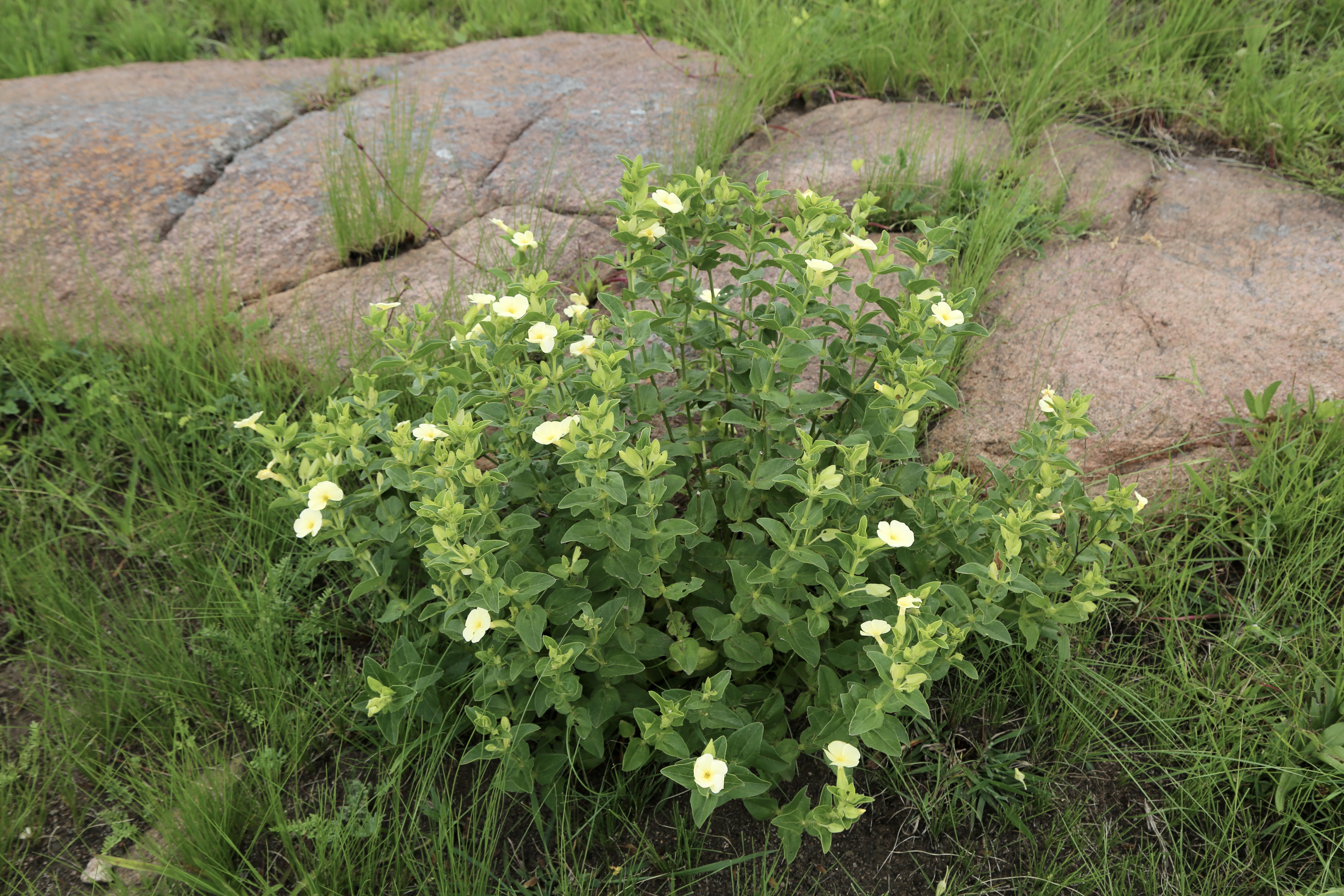
Flowering plant in December. Vernon Crookes Nature Reserve, KwaZulu-Natal

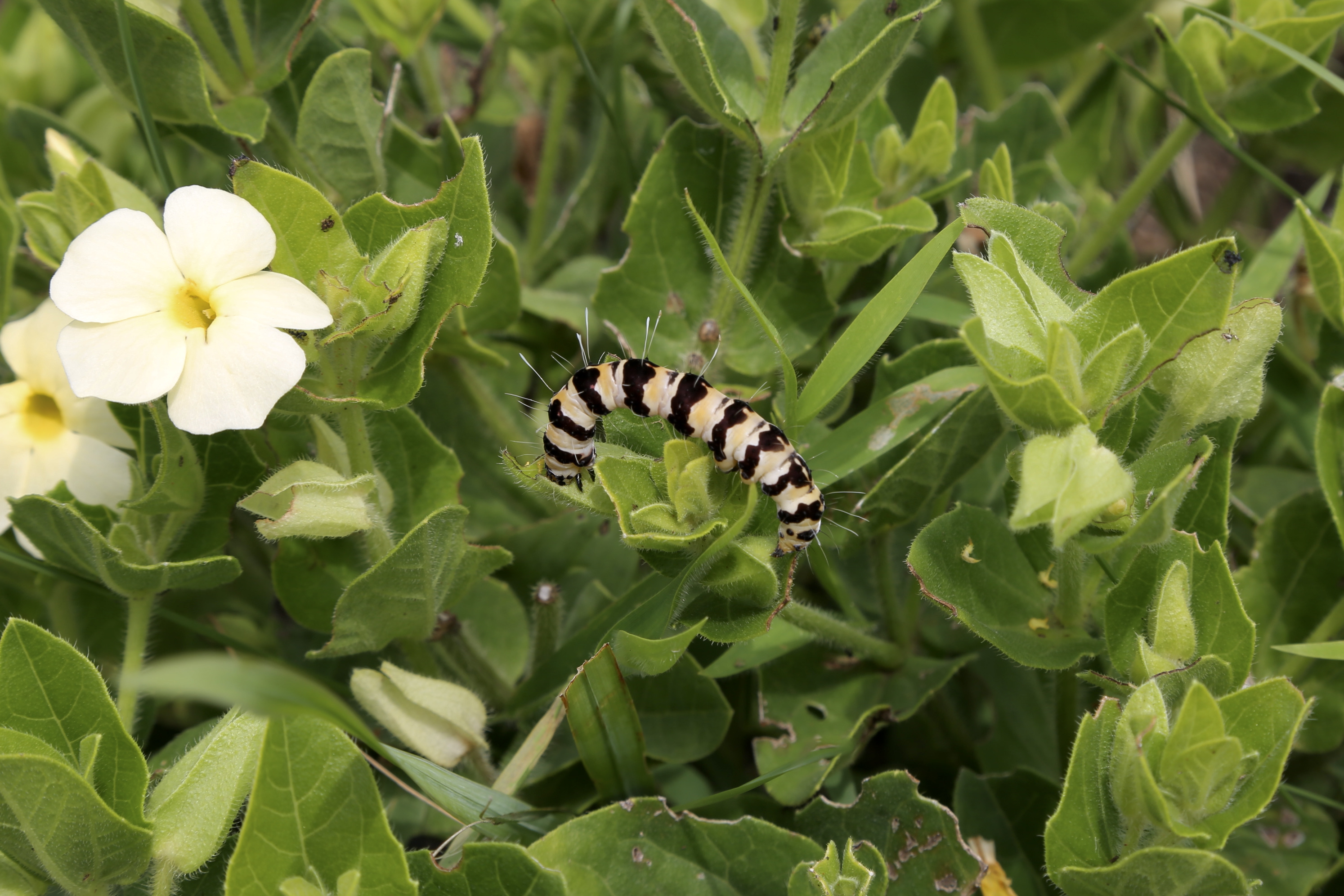
Thunbergia atriplicifolia is a larval foodplant for Rhanidophora moths

Thunbergia atriplicifolia is a perennial, sparsely to densely pubescent shrublet reaching up to 4 cm high. Re-sprouts from a woody base. Leaves are sessile or with petioles up to 4 mm long; blade is narrow to broad ovate with acute to obtuse apex and cordate to cuneate base, about 2.5–6.0 x 1.5–3.5 cm; margins are entire or toothed, usually only with two teeth at the base. Flowers are trumpet-shaped, pale creamy with yellow throat, 4–5 cm in diameter. Seeds are reddish- or greyish-brown with evenly arranged trichomes, 4-6 mm in diameter.

== Ecology ==
Thunbergia atriplicifolia is a subordinate grassland species where it grows best in both loam and sandy soil.

== Distribution ==
The species can be found through eastern South Africa.
