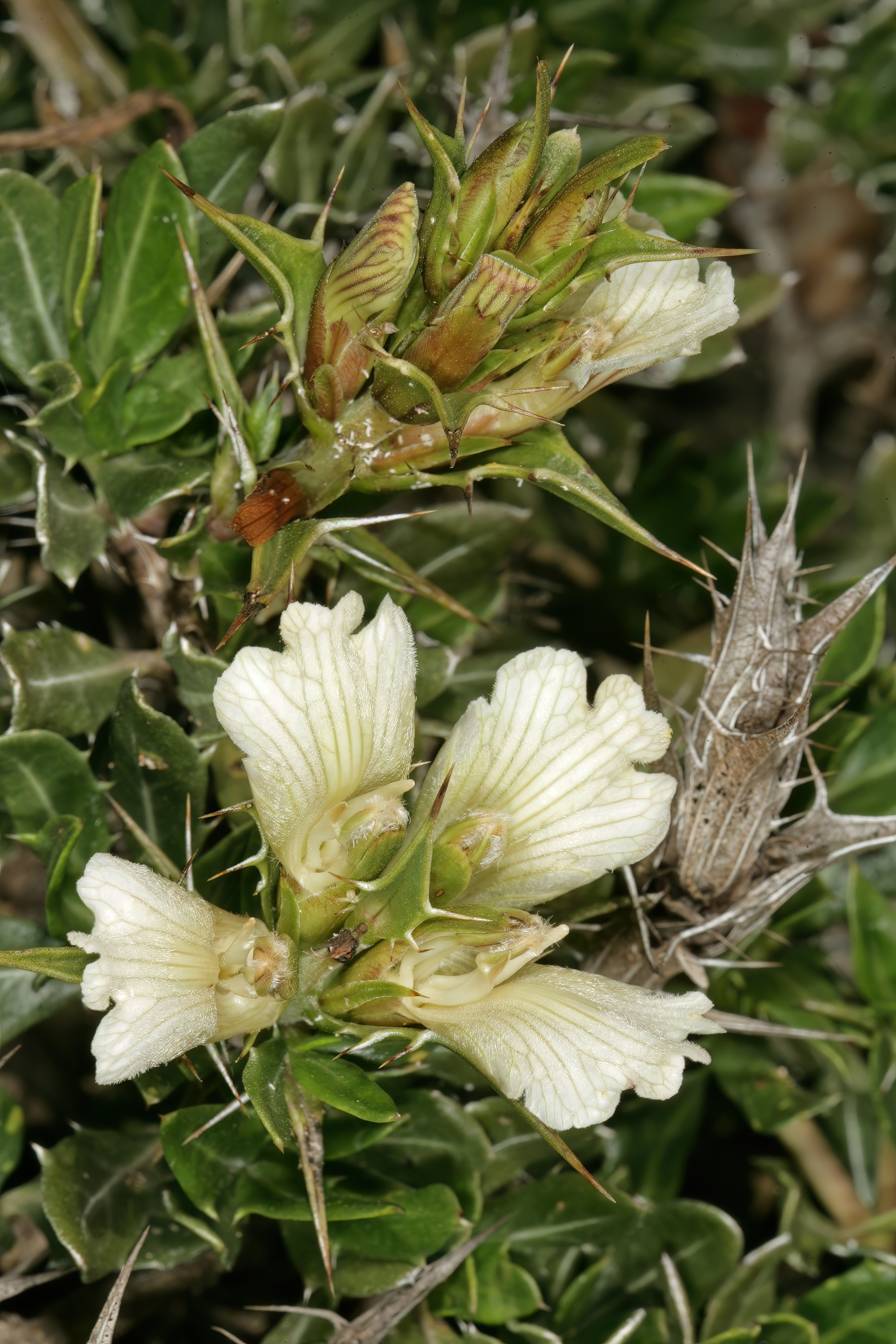
- In Little Karoo, South Africa

Scientific classification
- Kingdom: Plantae
- Clade: Tracheophytes
- Clade: Angiosperms
- Clade: Eudicots
- Clade: Asterids
- Order: Lamiales
- Family: Acanthaceae
- Genus: Blepharis
- Species: B. capensis

Binomial name
- Blepharis capensis (L.f.) Pers.

= Blepharis capensis =

Species of plant

Blepharis capensis; also known as Cape lashes, is a species of plant in the genus Blepharis.

== Range and habitat ==
Blepharis capensis is native to South Africa, ranging from Namibia to Cape Province, which it lives in the subtropics.
