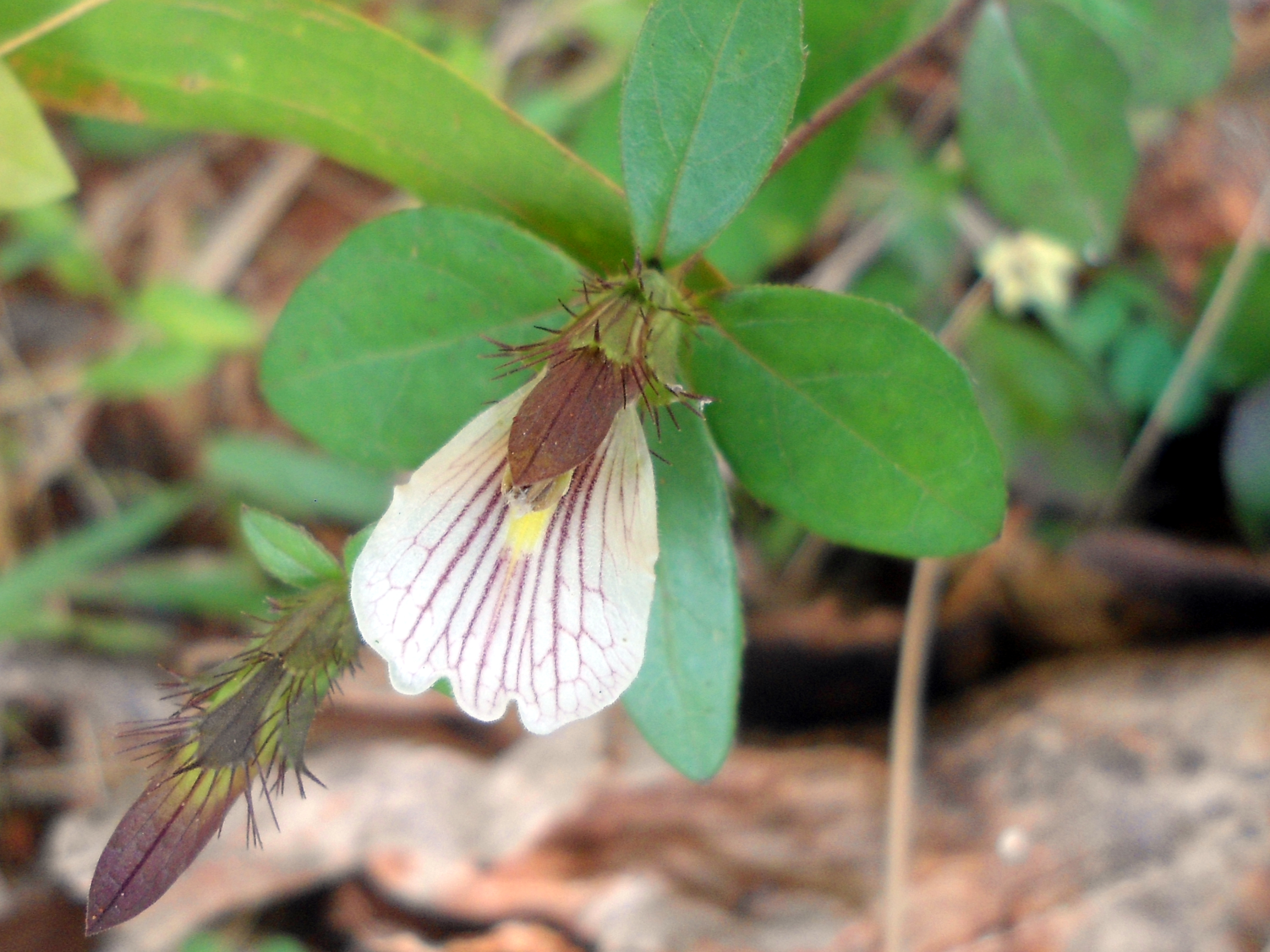
- Blepharis maderaspatensis at Kambalakonda Wildlife Sanctuary

Scientific classification
- Kingdom: Plantae
- Clade: Tracheophytes
- Clade: Angiosperms
- Clade: Eudicots
- Clade: Asterids
- Order: Lamiales
- Family: Acanthaceae
- Genus: Blepharis
- Species: B. maderaspatensis

Binomial name
- Blepharis maderaspatensis (L.) B.Heyne ex Roth, Nov. Pl. Sp. 320. (1821)

Synonyms
- List: Acanthodium procumbens Nees; Acanthus ciliaris Burm. fil.; Acanthus maderaspatensis L.; Acanthus procumbens Herb. Madr. ex Wall.; Blepharis abyssinica Hochst. ex A. Rich.; Blepharis boerhaaviifolia Pers.; Blepharis boerhaviifolia var. maderaspatensis (L.) Nees; Blepharis breviciliata Fiori; Blepharis maderaspatensis var. abyssinica Fiori; Blepharis maderaspatensis subsp. rubiifolia (Schumach.) Napper; Blepharis procumbens Heyne ex Roth; Blepharis procurrens Nees; Blepharis rubiifolia Schum.; Blepharis teaguei Oberm.; Blepharis togodelia Solms ex Schweinf.

= Blepharis maderaspatensis =

Species of blepharis

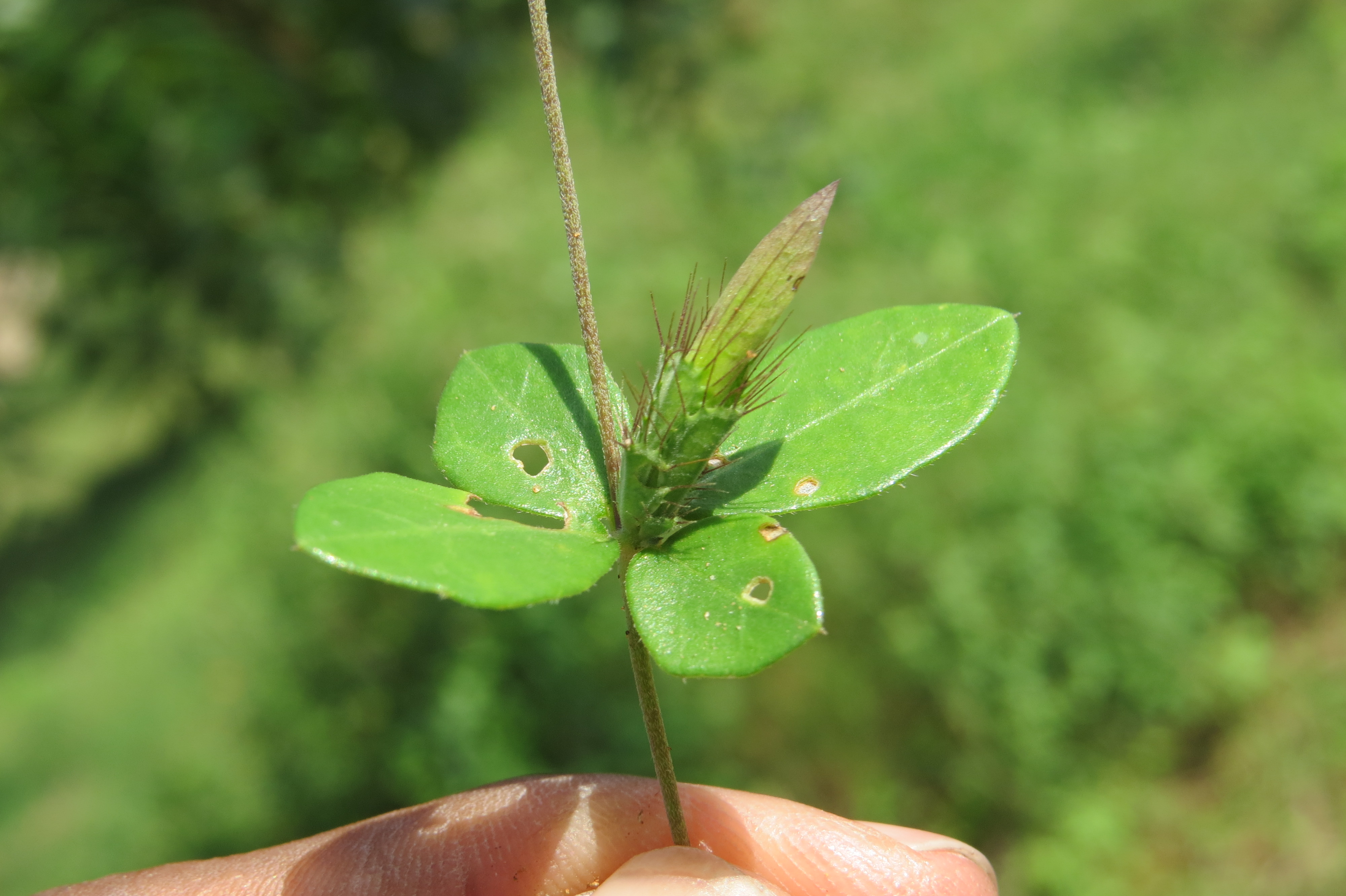

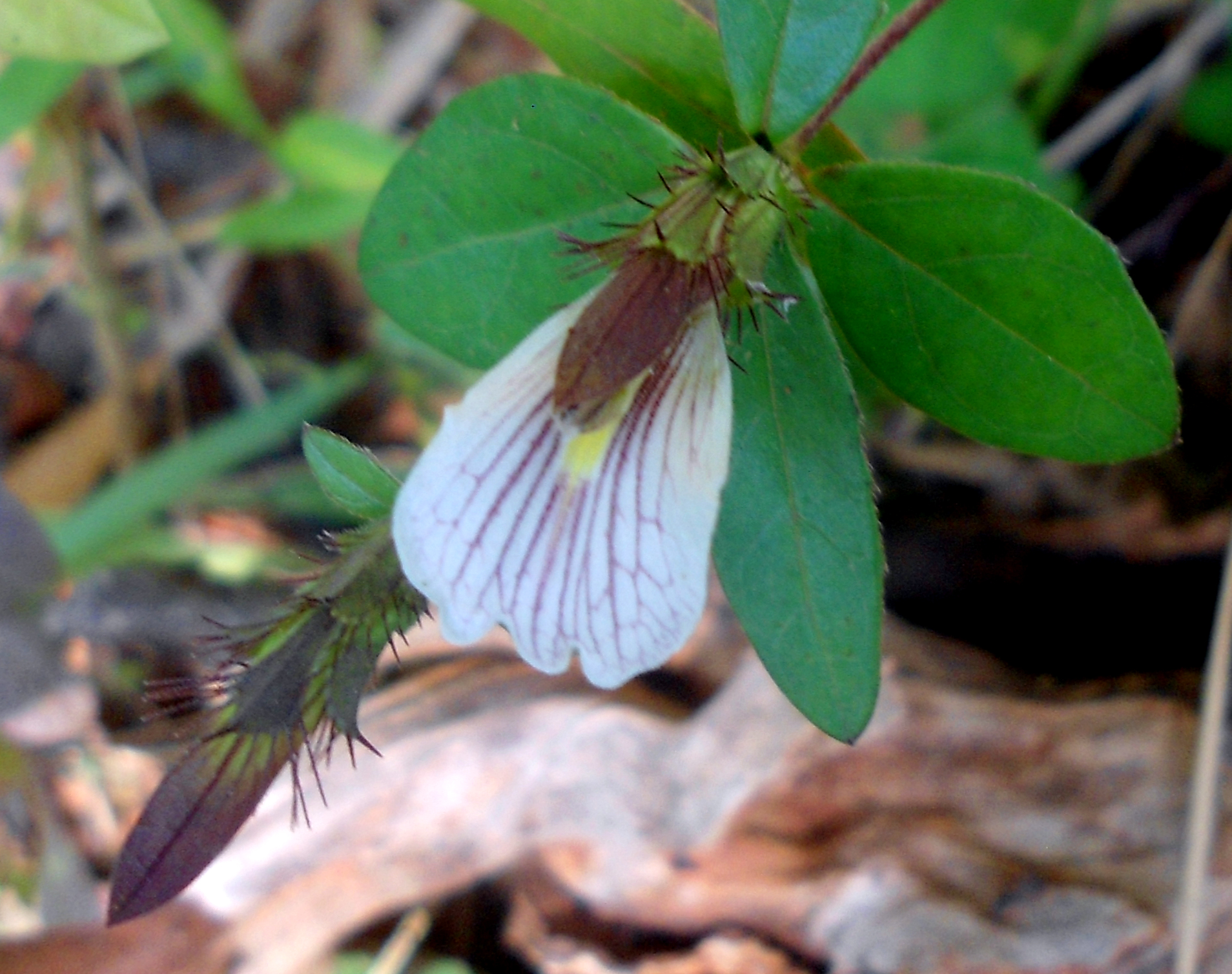

Blepharis maderaspatensis is a species of suffrutescent herb in the family Acanthaceae found in seasonally dry to arid habitats from Africa over Arabia to Southeast Asia.

== Distribution ==
The species is native to continental Africa, Arabia and tropical parts of Asia: the Indian subcontinent, Southeast Asia and Hainan in China.

== Description ==
Maderaspatensis is described as being a scrambling, suffrutescent perennial herb which can stem up to 2.5 m in height with whorled four hairy leaves that are elliptic of size 2–9(–12.5) × 0.8–3.5(–5) cm, at each node, with axillary spike inflorescence. and white flowers 1/2 inches long found in the clustered form .
