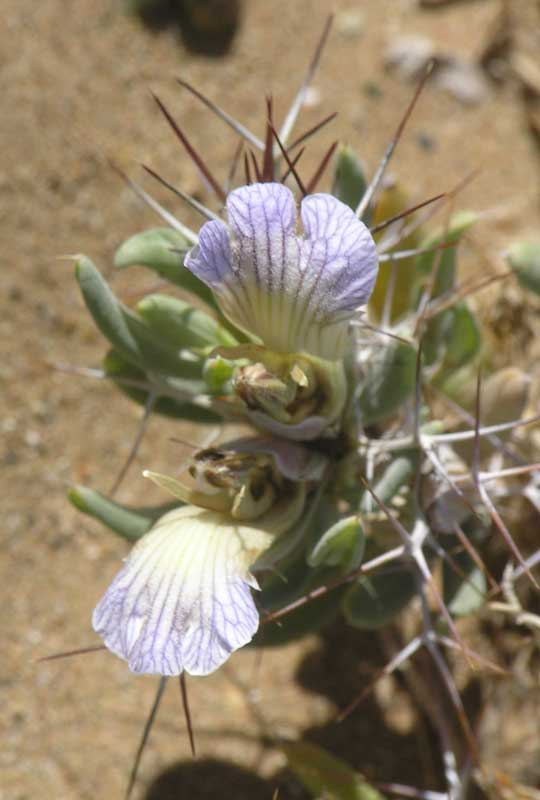

Conservation status
- Least Concern (SANBI Red List)

Scientific classification
- Kingdom: Plantae
- Clade: Tracheophytes
- Clade: Angiosperms
- Clade: Eudicots
- Clade: Asterids
- Order: Lamiales
- Family: Acanthaceae
- Genus: Blepharis
- Species: B. mitrata

Binomial name
- Blepharis mitrata C.B.Clarke

Synonyms
- Acanthodium capense var. villosum Nees; Blepharis villosa (Nees) C.B.Clarke

= Blepharis mitrata =

Species of flowering plant

Blepharis mitrata is a species of plant in the family Acanthaceae. It a subshrub native to deserts and dry shrublands in Namibia and the Cape Provinces and Free State of South Africa, including the Khomas Honchland. It is threatened by habitat loss. The whole plant is very spiny.

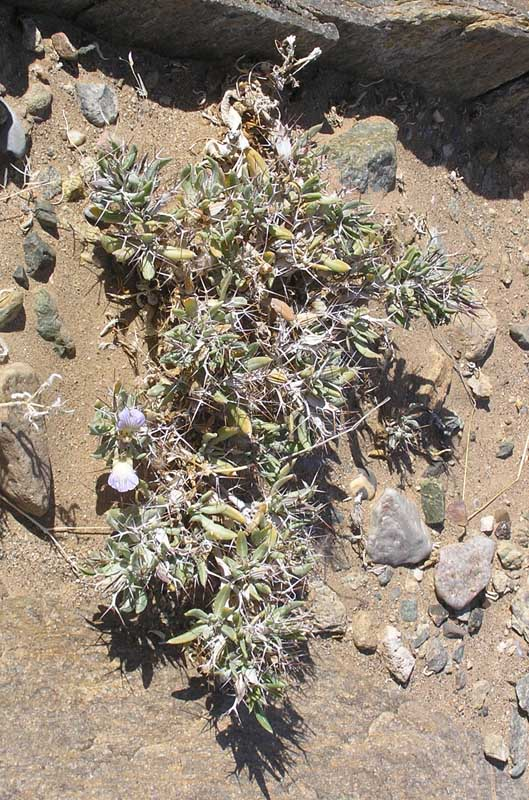
Blepharis mitrata photographed in Klein Aus, Karas

== In traditional medicine ==
The fruits, seeds and roots of Blepharis mitrata are claimed to be useful for hemorrhoids, cough, wounds and fontanel hardening, though further analysis is needed to determine its true medical value.
