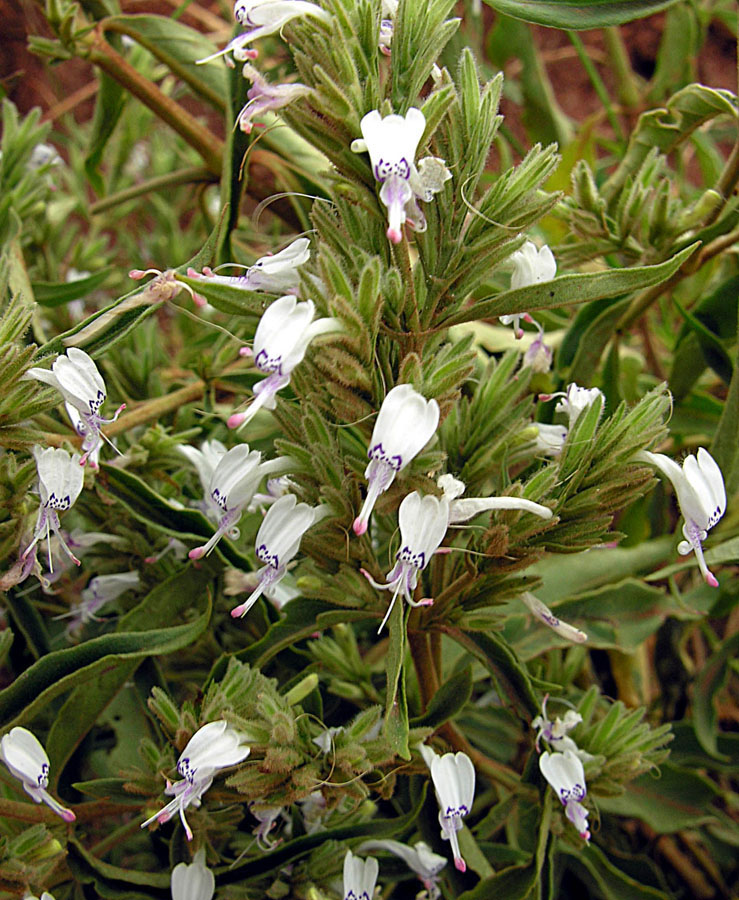

Scientific classification
- Kingdom: Plantae
- Clade: Tracheophytes
- Clade: Angiosperms
- Clade: Eudicots
- Clade: Asterids
- Order: Lamiales
- Family: Acanthaceae
- Genus: Hypoestes
- Species: H. forskaolii

Binomial name
- Hypoestes forskaolii (Vahl) Soland ex Roem & Schult

= Hypoestes forskaolii =

Species of flowering plant

Hypoestes forskaolii is an annual or perennial herb that grows up to 1 m (3 ft 3 in) tall with its stem and leaves being nearly glabrous. It has pale pink or white flowers.

== Habitat ==
Hypoestes forskaolii is widely distributed throughout Oman, Yemen, Saudi Arabia and Tropical Africa. It grows under bushes and trees. Hypoestes forskaolii appear during rains or can be seen the year round near water.

== Effects ==
Hypoestes forskaolii is extremely toxic to all livestock. It can be easily eaten in error by animals. It produces symptoms of violent shivering, head-shaking, and fever when eaten. It can be fatal in smaller or less healthy livestock.

== Uses ==
Hypoestes forskaolii is of interest for containing new sources of antibiotic compounds.

== History ==
Forsskaolii commemorates the Swedish botanist Pietr Forsskal. He was the botanist on the ill-fated Danish expedition to Arabia Felix (present-day North Yemen) of 1761–1763. The expedition's aims were wide-ranging, and from a botanical point of view, the trip was a great success. Many Arabian plants were described for the first time.
