= Isoglossa ciliata =

Scientific classification
- Kingdom: Plantae
- Clade: Tracheophytes
- Clade: Angiosperms
- Clade: Eudicots
- Clade: Asterids
- Order: Lamiales
- Family: Acanthaceae
- Genus: Isoglossa
- Species: I. ciliata

Binomial name
- Isoglossa ciliata (Nees) Engl.

Species of flowering plant

Isoglossa ciliata is a species of plant in the family Acanthaceae native to southern Africa.

== Description ==
Isoglossa ciliata is a sprawling herbaceous perennial that grows on forest floor and margins, sometimes to 1 meter tall. It occurs from Knysna to KwaZulu-Natal. The leaves are simple, opposite, and ovate. The flower is white, occasionally pink, two-lipped, lower lip divided into 3 with mauve markings in the centre.
