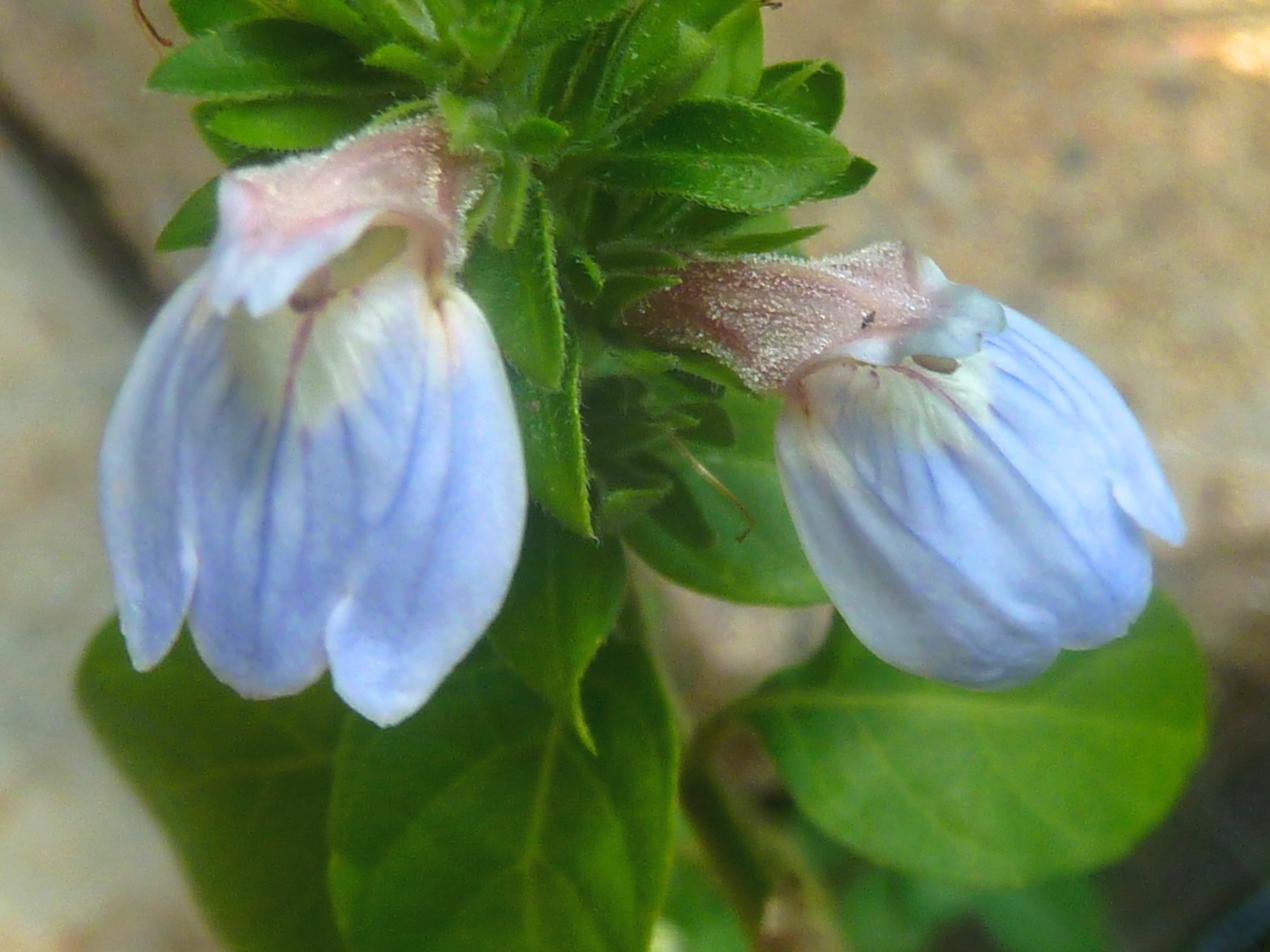
- Justicia petiolaris subsp. petiolaris

Scientific classification
- Kingdom: Plantae
- Clade: Tracheophytes
- Clade: Angiosperms
- Clade: Eudicots
- Clade: Asterids
- Order: Lamiales
- Family: Acanthaceae
- Genus: Justicia
- Species: J. petiolaris

Binomial name
- Justicia petiolaris (Nees) T.Anderson (1864)

Synonyms
- Adhatoda petiolaris Nees (1847); Ecbolium petiolare (Nees) Kuntze (1891)

= Justicia petiolaris =

Species of flowering plant

Justicia petiolaris is a plant species in the family Acanthaceae. It is a perennial or rhizomatous geophyte native to Mozambique, Eswatini, and eastern and southern South Africa.

== Subspecies ==
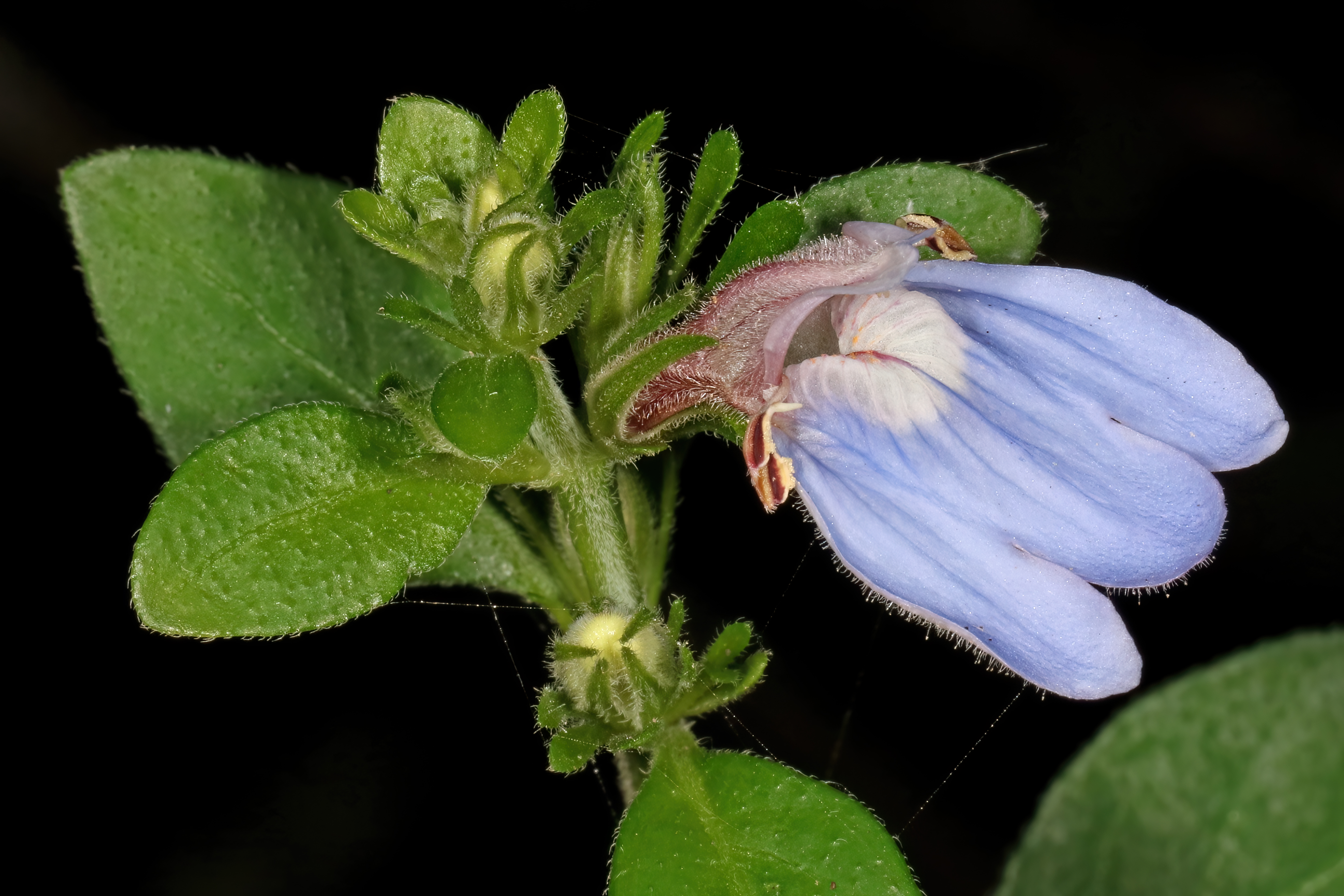
Justicia petiolaris subsp. bowiei

There are three subspecies:

- Justicia petiolaris subsp. petiolaris
- Justicia petiolaris subsp. bowiei (C.B. CI.) Immelman
- Justicia petiolaris subsp. incerta (C.B. CI.) Immelman
