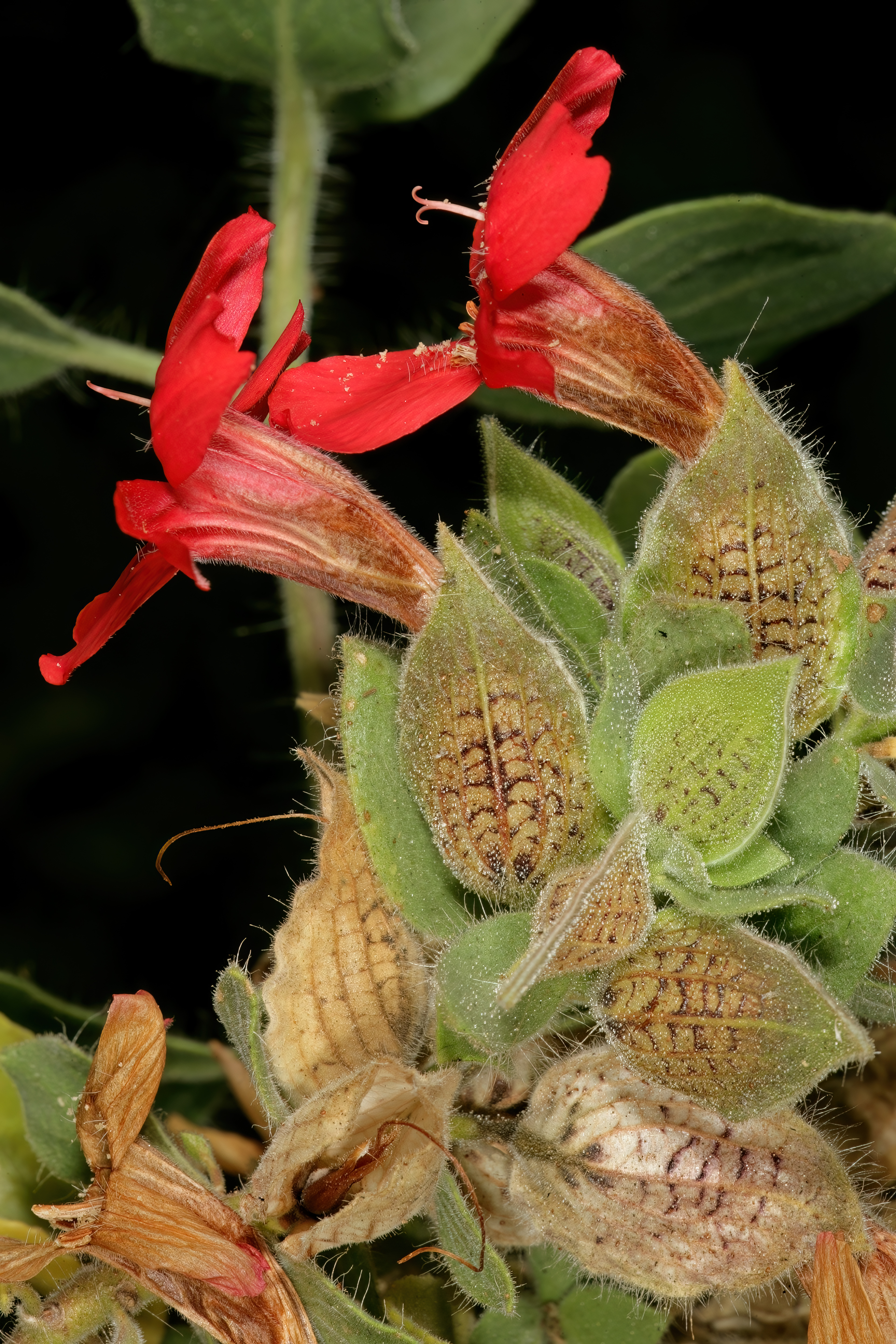
- In Kirstenbosch National Botanical Garden, Cape Town

Scientific classification
- Kingdom: Plantae
- Clade: Embryophytes
- Clade: Tracheophytes
- Clade: Angiosperms
- Clade: Eudicots
- Clade: Asterids
- Order: Lamiales
- Family: Acanthaceae
- Genus: Petalidium
- Species: P. coccineum

Binomial name
- Petalidium coccineum S.Moore

= Petalidium coccineum =

Species of shrub

Petalidium coccineum is a species of a fast-growing shrub that bears red flowers and smooth, white bark. This shrub may grow up to 2.5 m in height. It is native to northwestern Namibia, particularly the dry savannah of Kaokoveld and Owamboland. Flowers occur in short racemes up to 40 mm long, borne in the leaf axils. Like other species in its genus, Petalidium coccineum bears hygroscopic fruit capsules which, when moist, release two flat seeds explosively.

== Synonyms ==
- Petalidium rubescens Oberm.
- Pseudobarleria coccinea (S.Moore) Lindau
