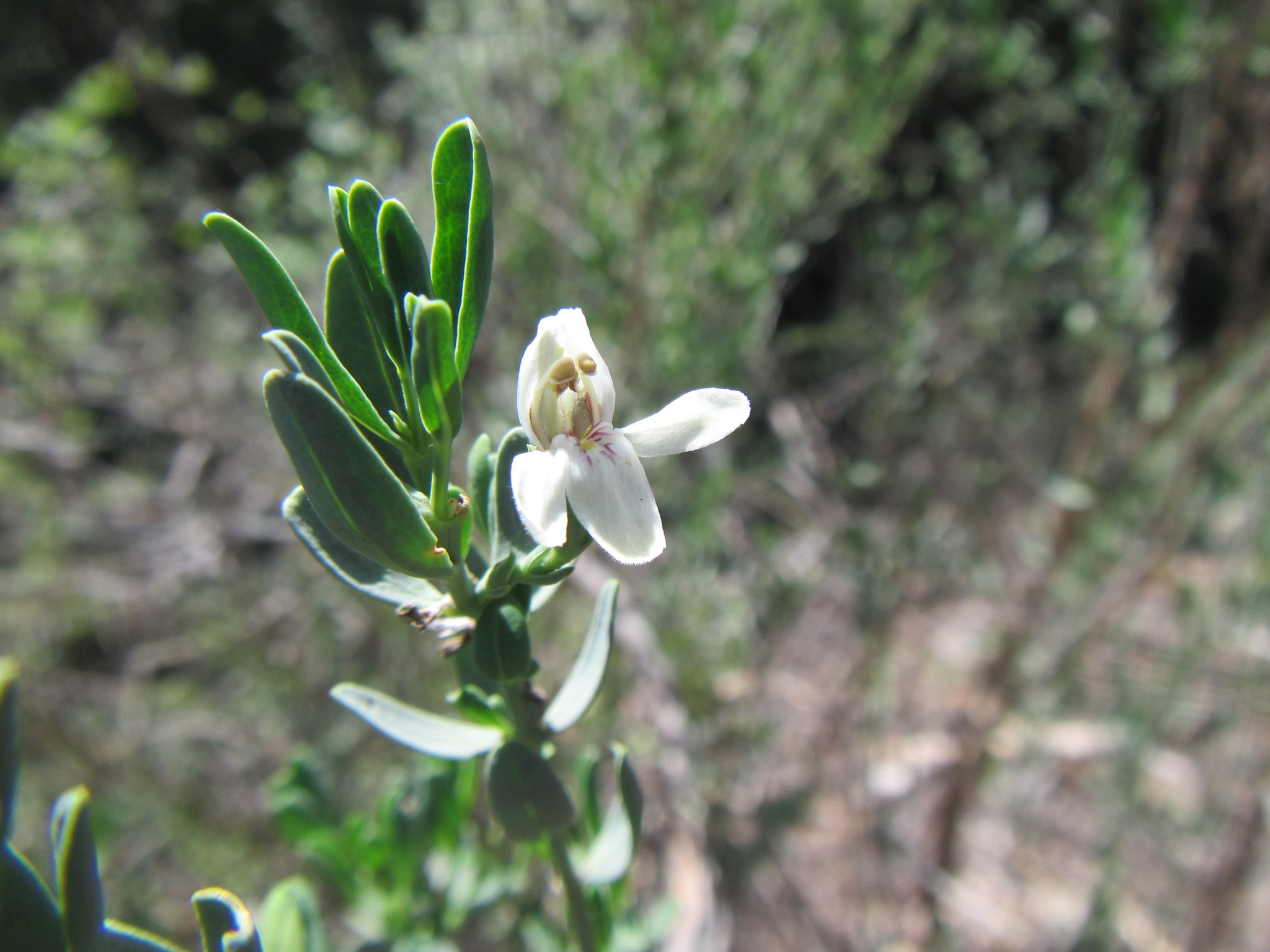

Conservation status
- Least Concern (SANBI Red List)

Scientific classification
- Kingdom: Plantae
- Clade: Tracheophytes
- Clade: Angiosperms
- Clade: Eudicots
- Clade: Asterids
- Order: Lamiales
- Family: Acanthaceae
- Genus: Justicia
- Species: J. cuneata

Binomial name
- Justicia cuneata Vahl (1791)

Synonyms
- Adhatoda cuneata (Vahl) Nees (1847); Ecbolium cuneatum (Vahl) Kuntze (1891); Gendarussa cuneata (Vahl) Nees ex Steud. (1841)

= Justicia cuneata =

Shrub endemic to the Cape Provinces

Justicia cuneata is a species of subshrub in the genus Justicia. It is native to Namibia and the Cape Provinces of South Africa.

== Distribution ==
Justicia cuneata is found from the Richtersveld through Namaqualand to the Knersvlakte and Sandveld, and from the Little Karoo and southern Great Karoo to near Port Elizabeth.

== Subspecies ==
Three subspecies are accepted:

- Justicia cuneata subsp. cuneata
- Justicia cuneata subsp. hoerleiniana (Dinter ex P.G.Mey.) Immelman
- Justicia cuneata subsp. latifolia (Nees) Immelman

== Conservation status ==
Justicia cuneata is classified as Least Concern as it is widespread and not in decline.
