= Ruellia =

- Ruellia tuberosa

Scientific classification
- Kingdom: Plantae
- Clade: Embryophytes
- Clade: Tracheophytes
- Clade: Spermatophytes
- Clade: Angiosperms
- Clade: Eudicots
- Clade: Asterids
- Order: Lamiales
- Family: Acanthaceae
- Subfamily: Acanthoideae
- Tribe: Ruellieae
- Genus: Ruellia; L.

Species
- Many, see text

Synonyms
- List: Alvarezia Pav. ex Nees; Aphragmia Nees; Aporuellia C.B.Clarke; Arrhostoxylum Mart. ex Nees; Benoicanthus Heine A.Raynal; Blechum P.Browne; Copioglossa Miers; Cryphiacanthus Nees; Cyrtacanthus Mart. ex Nees; Dipteracanthus Nees; Dizygandra Meisn.; Endosiphon T.Anderson ex Benth. Hook.f.; Eurychanes Nees; Eusiphon Benoist; Fabria E.Mey.; Gymnacanthus Nees; Gymnacanthus Oerst.; Holtzendorffia Klotzsch H.Karst. ex Nees; Larysacanthus Oerst.; Lychniothyrsus Lindau; Micraea Miers; Neowedia Schrad.; Nothoruellia Bremek. Nann.-Bremek.; Ophthalmacanthus Nees; Pattersonia J.F.Gmel.; Pentstemonacanthus Nees; Pseudoruellia Benoist; Salpingacanthus S.Moore; Sclerocalyx Nees; Scorodoxylum Nees; Siphonacanthus Nees; Solaenacanthus Oerst.; Spirostigma Nees; Stemonacanthus Nees; Stenoschista Bremek.; Stephanophysum Pohl; Tacoanthus Baill.; Tremacanthus S.Moore; Ulleria Bremek.

Genus of flowering plants

Ruellia is a genus of flowering plants commonly known as ruellias or wild petunias. They are not closely related to petunias (Petunia) although both genera belong to the same euasterid clade. The genus was named in honor of Jean Ruelle (1474–1537), herbalist and physician to Francis I of France and translator of several works of Dioscorides.

Numerous formerly independent genera are nowadays considered synonymous with Ruellia, including Blechum, Eusiphon, and Ulleria. Acanthopale and Polylychnis are considered a distinct genera.

Ruellias are popular ornamental plants. Some are used as medicinal plants, but many are known or suspected to be poisonous. Their leaves are food for the caterpillars of several Lepidoptera (butterflies and moths), typically Nymphalinae and in particular members of their tribe Junoniini, such as the larvae of the banded peacock (Anartia fatima). Nymphalinae using Ruellia as host plants include the common buckeye (Junonia coenia), recorded on R. nodiflora, the lemon pansy (Junonia lemonias), recorded on R. tuberosa, and the malachite butterfly (Siproeta stelenes) and Australian lurcher (Yoma sabina), which are recorded on several species.

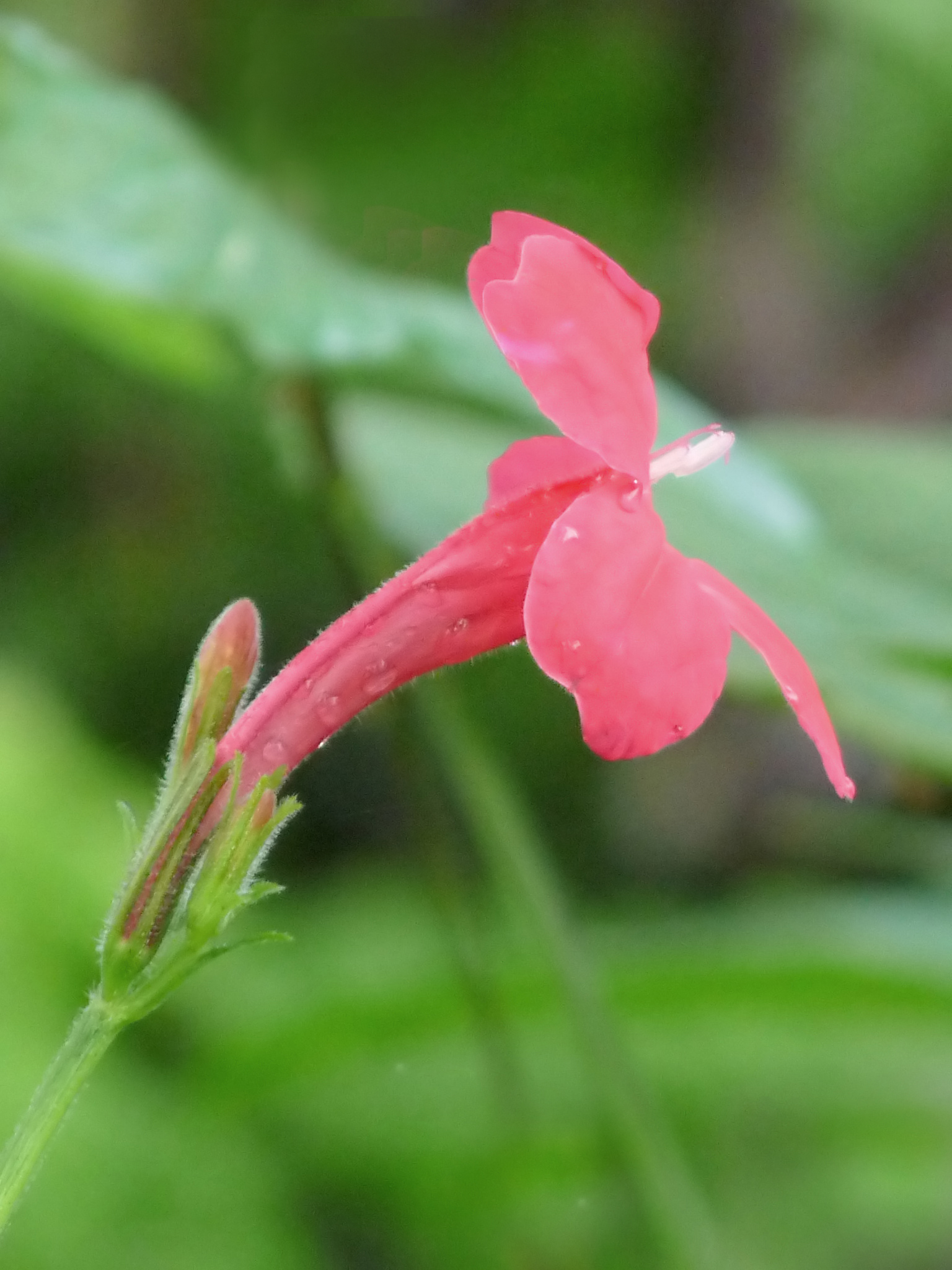
Ruellia elegans

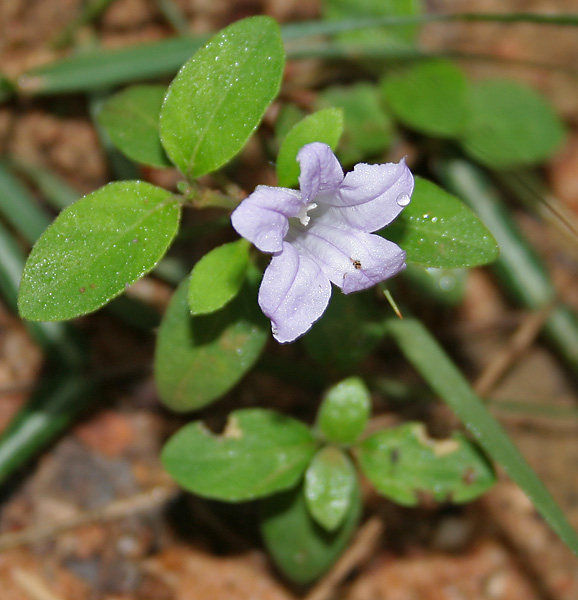
Bell weed (Ruellia prostrata)

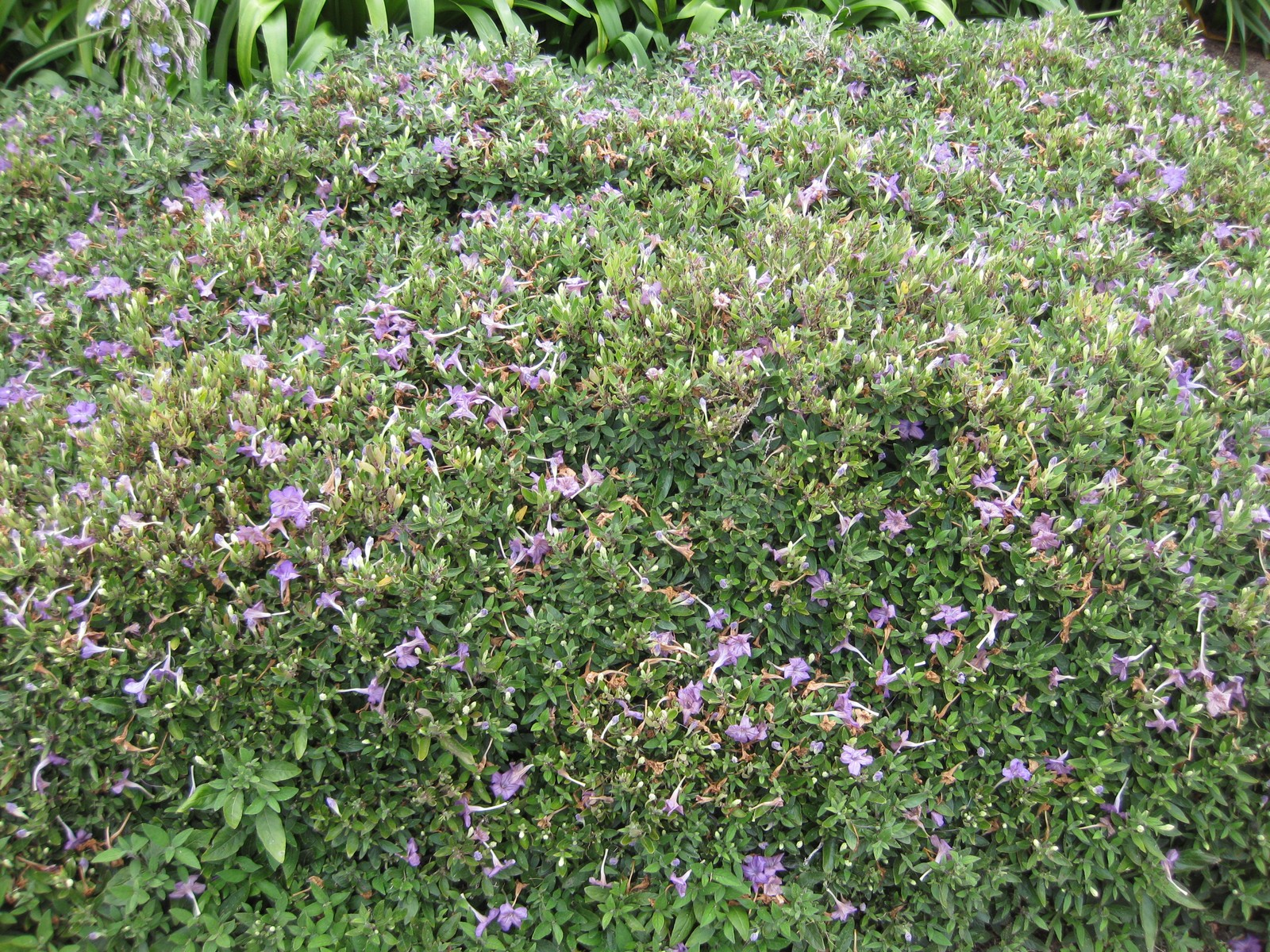
Ruellia dipteracanthus

== Selected species ==
365 species are accepted. They include:

- Ruellia acutangula Nees
- Ruellia affinis (Schrad.) T.Anderson
- Ruellia angustior (Nees) Lindau
- Ruellia asperula (Mart. & Nees) Lindau
- Ruellia bahiensis (Nees) Morong
- Ruellia blechum L.
- Ruellia blumei Steud.
- Ruellia bourgaei Hemsl.
- Ruellia brevifolia (Pohl) C.Ezcurra – tropical wild petunia, red Christmas pride
- Ruellia californica (Vasey & Rose) I.M.Johnst.
- Ruellia caroliniensis (J.F.Gmel.) Steud.
- Ruellia chartacea (T.Anderson) Wassh.
- Ruellia ciliatiflora Hook.
- Ruellia currorii T.Anderson
- Ruellia densa Hiern
- Ruellia devosiana Jacob-Makoy ex E.Morren
- Ruellia dielsii Mildbr.
- Ruellia dioscoridis Napper
- Ruellia dissitifolia (Nees) Hiern
- Ruellia drummondiana (Nees) A.Gray
- Ruellia elegans Poir.
- Ruellia eurycodon Lindau
- Ruellia fulgida Andrews
- Ruellia geminiflora Kunth – ipecacuanha-da-flor-roxa (Portuguese)
- Ruellia hapalotricha Lindau
- Ruellia helianthema (Nees) Profice
- Ruellia humilis Nutt. – fringeleaf wild petunia, plains petunia, fringeleaf ruellia, hairy ruellia, low ruellia, zigzag ruel
- Ruellia hypericoides (Nees) Lindau
- Ruellia incomta (Nees) Lindau
- Ruellia inundata Kunth
- Ruellia insignis Balf.f.
- Ruellia jaliscana Standl.
- Ruellia jussieuoides Schltdl. & Cham.
- Ruellia kuriensis Vierh.
- Ruellia macrantha (Nees) Gower – Christmas pride
- Ruellia macrophylla Vahl
- Ruellia makoyana Hort.Makoy ex Closon
- Ruellia mcvaughii T.F.Daniel
- Ruellia menthoides (Nees) Hiern
- Ruellia metziae Tharp
- Ruellia multifolia (Nees) Lindau
- Ruellia nitens (Nees) Wassh.
- Ruellia noctiflora (Nees) A.Gray
- Ruellia novogaliciana T.F. Daniel
- Ruellia nudiflora (Engelm. & A.Gray) Urb.
- Ruellia patula Jacq.
- Ruellia paulayana Vierh.
- Ruellia pedunculata Torr. ex A.Gray
- Ruellia prostrata Poir.
- Ruellia rasa Hiern
- Ruellia rosea (Nees) Hemsl.
- Ruellia rufipila Rizzini
- Ruellia simplex C.Wright
- Ruellia spissa Leonard
- Ruellia stemonacanthoides (Oerst.) Hemsl.
- Ruellia strepens L.
- Ruellia trachyphylla Lindau
- Ruellia tuberosa L. – minnie root, fever root, snapdragon root, sheep potato, popping pod, duppy gun, cracker plant (syn. R. picta)
- Ruellia verbasciformis (Nees) C.Ezcurra & Zappi
- Ruellia villosa (Nees) Lindau

=== Uncertain status ===
- Ruellia brevicaulis (Nees) Lindau (synonym Dipteracanthus brevicaulis Nees) – Unplaced
- Ruellia eriocalyx Glaz.
- Ruellia flava Pers. – Unplaced
- Ruellia pohlii (synonym Dipteracanthus pohlii Nees) – Unplaced
- Ruellia stenandrium

=== Formerly placed here ===
Numerous plants, mainly in the family Acanthaceae, are former members of Ruellia. Some examples are:

- Asystasia gangetica subsp. micrantha (Nees) Ensermu (as R. intrusa Forssk.)
- Asystasia gangetica subsp. gangetica (as R. zeylanica J.Koenig ex Roxb.)
- Blepharis ciliaris (L.) B.L.Burtt (as R. ciliaris L. or R. persica Burm.f.)
- Dyschoriste oblongifolia (Michx.) Kuntze (as R. oblongifolia Michx.)
- Hemigraphis repanda (L.) Hallier f. (as R. repanda L.)
- Hygrophila costata Nees et al. (as R. brasiliensis Spreng.)
- Hygrophila difformis (L.f.) Blume (as R. difformis L. f.)
- Hygrophila lacustris (Schltdl. & Cham.) Nees (as R. lacustris Schltdl. & Cham.)
- Hygrophila ringens (L.) R. Br. ex Steud. (as R. ringens L. or R. salicifolia Vahl)
- Lepidagathis alopecuroidea (Vahl) R. Br. ex Griseb. (as R. alopecuroidea Vahl)
- Lindernia antipoda (L.) Alston (as R. antipoda L.)
- Mackaya neesiana (Wall.) Das (as R. neesiana Wall.)
- Stenandrium dulce (Cav.) Nees (as R. dulcis Cav.)
- Strobilanthes anisophylla (Lodd. et al.) T. Anderson (as R. anisophylla Lodd. et al.)
- Strobilanthes hamiltoniana (Steud.) Bosser & Heine (as R. hamiltoniana Steud.)
- Strobilanthes tomentosa (Nees) J.R.I.Wood (as R. tomentosa Wall.)
- Teliostachya alopecuroidea Nees (as R. alopecuroidea, R. alopecuroides)

== See also ==
- 21540 Itthipanyanan, an asteroid named after a student who authored an award-winning experiment on the dehiscence and dispersion of Ruellia tuberosa seed pods.
