= Ruellia noctiflora =

Conservation status
- Imperiled (NatureServe)

Scientific classification
- Kingdom: Plantae
- Clade: Tracheophytes
- Clade: Angiosperms
- Clade: Eudicots
- Clade: Asterids
- Order: Lamiales
- Family: Acanthaceae
- Genus: Ruellia
- Species: R. noctiflora

Binomial name
- Ruellia noctiflora ( Nees) Gray

Synonyms
- Ruellia tubiflora Dipteracanthus noctiflorus

Species of flowering plant

Ruellia noctiflora, the nightflowering wild petunia, is a herbaceous perennial found along the Gulf coast. Both its specific and common names derive from its habit of nocturnal flowering. In spite of the common name it is in a different family from the garden petunia.

It is considered endangered in Florida.

== Description ==
The plant grows to 16 in (41 cm) with oval, pointed, usually stalkless leaves up to 2.8 in (7.1 cm) long borne in pairs on thin, hairy, purplish stems. It bears white, trumpet-shaped, five-petalled flowers 3 in (7.6 cm) long and 4 in (10 cm) across; these open at night and fall by mid-morning, and are pollinated by hawk moths, whose long proboscises allow them to reach the nectar held at the base of the flower. The resulting fruit is a capsule .8 in (2.0 cm) long with the long style retained, resting among the five long spikey sepals. When ripe it splits in half longitudinally, discharging the seed. Unusually for the genus no cleistogamous flowers are formed.

== Adaptation ==
R. noctiflora is set apart from other species of the Ruellia by its flower color and reproductive behavior. Most of the genus resemble one other with purple and blue flowers, and have adapted for bee pollination that occurs during the daytime. R. noctiflora differs significantly, possessing white flowers and behaving nocturnally, experiencing nighttime pollination via Dobla hyloseus, the common hawkmoth.

== Threats ==
Ruellia noctiflora specimen

Controlled wildland fires are a central threat to R. noctiflora. Other minor threats to the species include herbicides, diseases, and other invasive species taking over habitat space. The specific habitat, narrow range, and nocturnal pollination habits of the plant make it increasing vulnerable.

Heavy urban expansion has also played a negative role in the existence of the plant. Pine plantations, homes, and businesses have taken their place. Transportation and service corridors built for efficiency travel and shipping through the Southeastern regions have intruded as well.

== Habitat and Distribution ==
R. noctiflora is generally a wetland plant and prefers longleaf pine savanna. It can be found along the Gulf Coastal Plain, in southeast Georgia, South Carolina, Florida, Alabama, Mississippi, and Louisiana. There are approximately 57 occurrences: Alabama (9), Florida (28), Georgia (8), Louisiana (5), and Mississippi (16). Around 14 of these occurrences had very good viability.

R. noctiflora are primarily grown in moist to wet flatwoods and savannahs, bogs, and low wet hammocks, depending on the specific region where it is found. They are even found alongside wet roadsides. R. Noctiflora prefer loamy soil and full sun exposure. In Pine Savannahs, they specifically flourish best with minimal shrub undergrowth, but having a wide diversity of herbs in the understory.

One ecological difference that separate Ruellia Noctiflora from other Ruellia species, is their ability to adapt and thrive in moist, peaty pinelands and savannahs; Other Ruellia species are consistently found in mesic, moderate habitats in the Eastern region of the US.

Hybridization studies with other North American Ruellia species suggest a close relationship with Ruellia caroliniensis, which grows across the United States southeast.
