= R. formosa =

R. formosa may refer to:

- Ramaria formosa, a coral fungus
- Randia formosa, a New World plant
- Rhodophaea formosa, a snout moth
- Ruellia formosa, a plant native to Brazil
