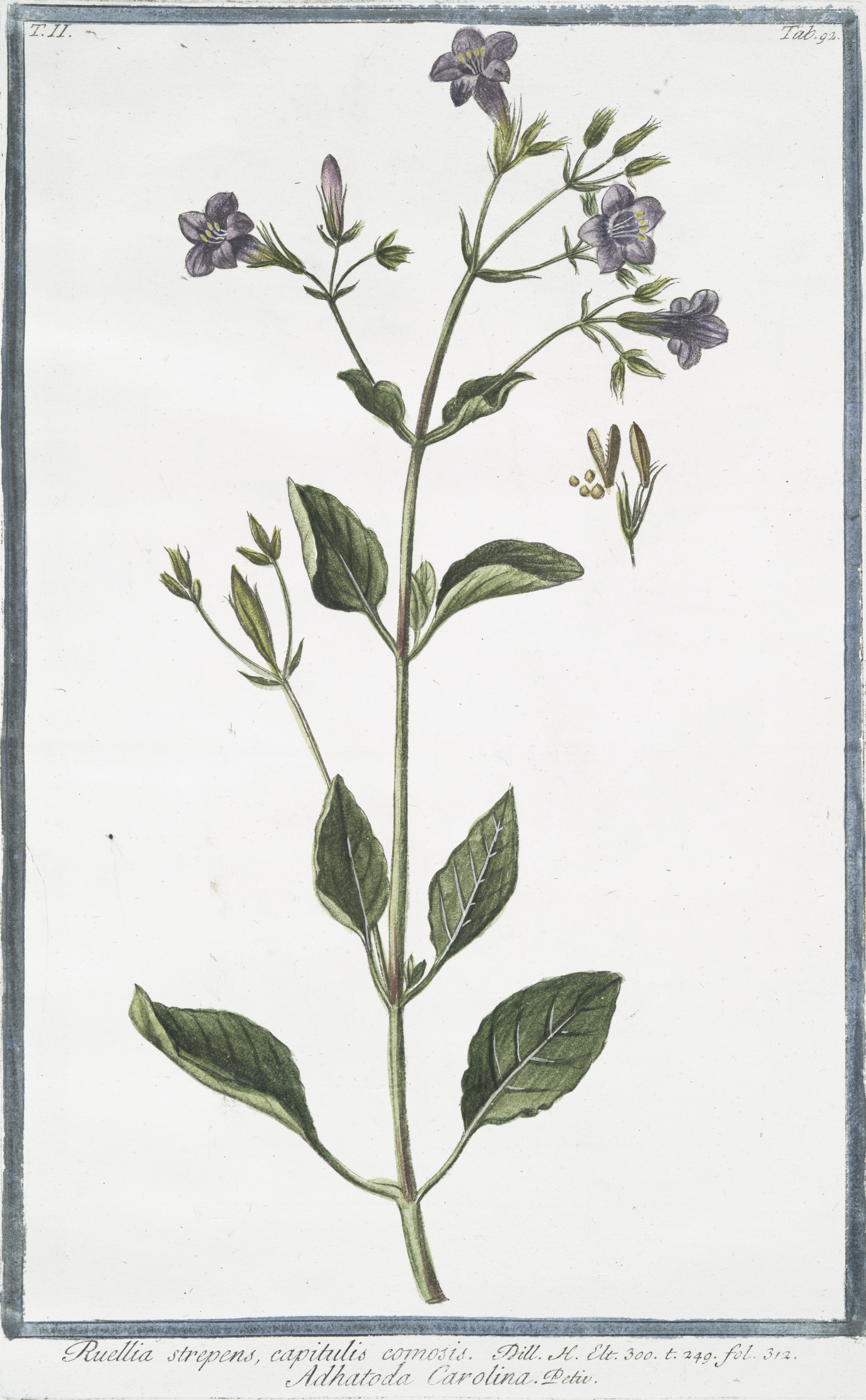
- Botanical illustration
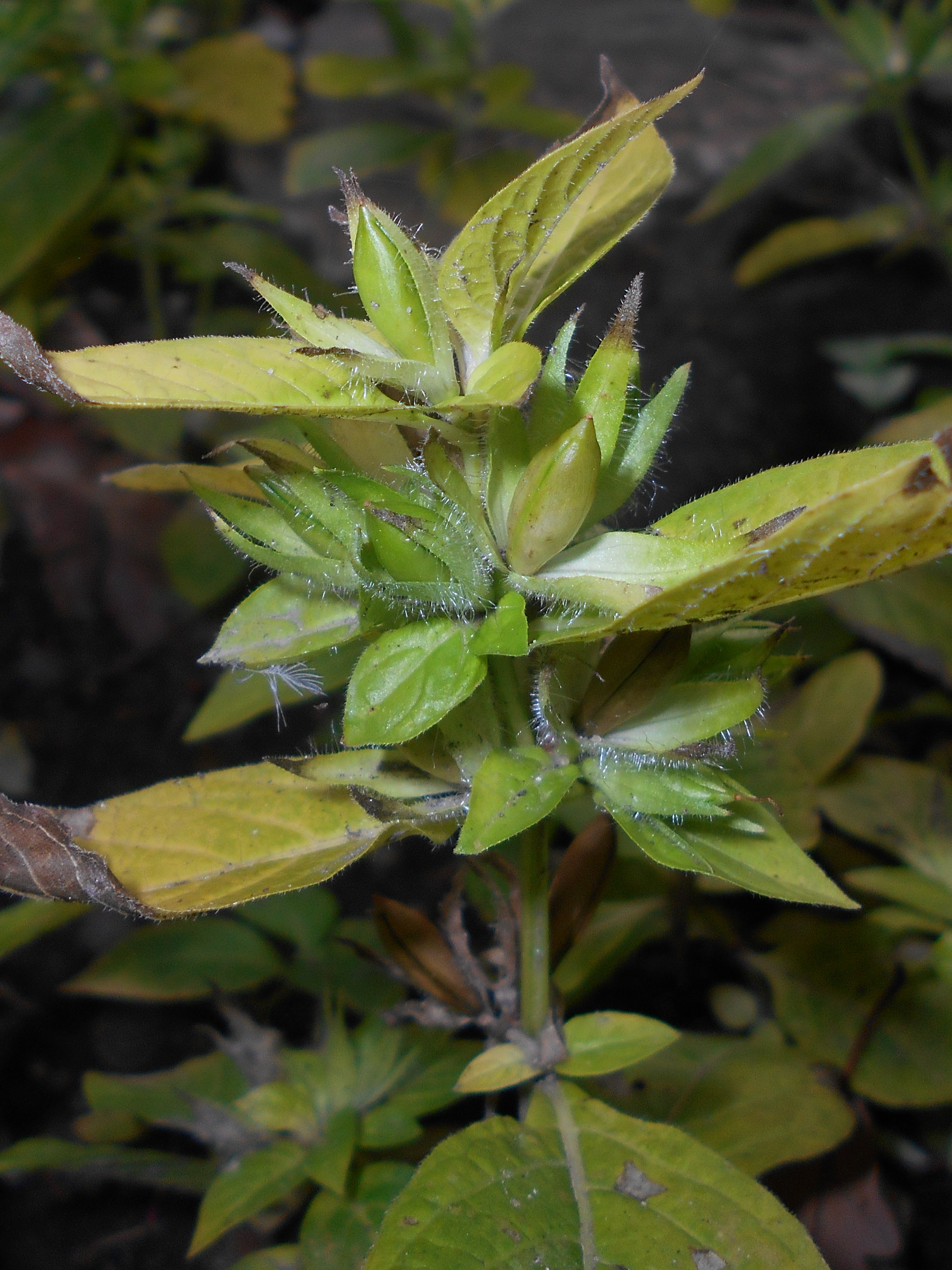
- Flowers budding

Conservation status
- Apparently Secure (NatureServe)

Scientific classification
- Kingdom: Plantae
- Clade: Embryophytes
- Clade: Tracheophytes
- Clade: Angiosperms
- Clade: Eudicots
- Clade: Asterids
- Order: Lamiales
- Family: Acanthaceae
- Genus: Ruellia
- Species: R. strepens

Binomial name
- Ruellia strepens L.

Synonyms
- List: Dipteracanthus micranthus Engelm. & A.Gray; Dipteracanthus oblongatus Nees; Dipteracanthus strepens C.Presl; Dipteracanthus strepens var. calycinus Nees; Dipteracanthus strepens var. clandestinus Nees; Dipteracanthus strepens var. dillenii Nees; Dipteracanthus strepens f. pedunculatus Nees; Dipteracanthus strepens var. strictus (Nees) Nees; Dipteracanthus strictus Nees; Hygrophila illinoiensis A.Gray; Ruellia biflora Balb. ex Nees; Ruellia foliosa Schwein. ex Nees; Ruellia oblongifolia Nees; Ruellia ovata Nees; Ruellia strepens f. alba Steyerm.; Ruellia strepens var. cleistantha A.Gray; Ruellia strepens f. cleistantha (A.Gray) S.McCoy; Ruellia strepens var. micrantha (Engelm. & A.Gray) Britton; Ruellia vinciflora DC. ex Nees

= Ruellia strepens =

Species of flowering plant

Ruellia strepens, commonly known as limestone wild petunia, limestone ruellia, smooth wild petunia, or wild petunia is a species of flowering plant in the family Acanthaceae, native to warmer parts of the central and eastern United States. A perennial herb, it prefers to grow in moist to mesic, partly shady areas such as streamsides and bottomland forests. In the garden it is hardy to USDA zone 5, and can tolerate nearly full shade.

== Description ==
R. strepena grows up to 1 m (3 ft) tall, branching occasionally. The green stems either smooth or sparsely hairy. The leaves are opposite on the stem, have short petioles, and are lanceolate or ovate, tapering to a sharp point at the end. They measure up to 13 cm (5 in) long and 8 cm (3 in) across. Their margins are smooth or slightly undulate.

The flowers are lavender to bluish, growing from nodes near the middle of the stems. They have 5 flaring lobes and are tubular, measuring up to 5 cm (2 in) long.

Although many herbaceous plants cease growing or even die back after blooming, R. strepens continues to get bigger as its fruits mature, resulting in late season plants that might be twice as tall as they were when flowering.

== Etymology ==
The genus name Ruellia honors Jean Ruelle, a French physician and botanist (1474 – 1537). Its specific epithet strepens refers to the rustling noises the plant's seeds make as they uncoil and bury themselves into the ground.

== Distribution and habitat ==
R. strepena is native in the United States from Nebraska to the west, Texas and Florida to the south, Michigan and Pennsylvania to the north, and the east coast to the east. It is listed as endangered in Michigan and North Carolina and critically imperiled in South Carolina. It lives in bottomland forests, rich upland forests, river and stream banks, and edges of ponds and lakes. It can also be found occasionally in bottomland prairies and fens, pastures, moist roadsides, and railroads.
