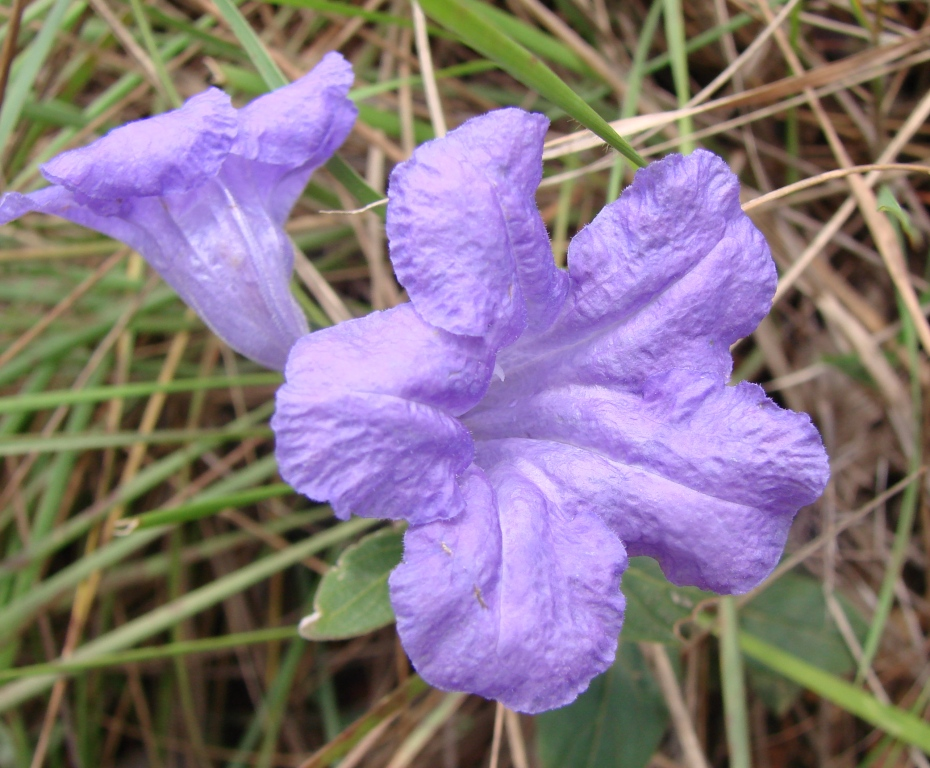

Scientific classification
- Kingdom: Plantae
- Clade: Tracheophytes
- Clade: Angiosperms
- Clade: Eudicots
- Clade: Asterids
- Order: Lamiales
- Family: Acanthaceae
- Genus: Ruellia
- Species: R. geminiflora

Binomial name
- Ruellia geminiflora Kunth (1818)

Synonyms
- Synonymy: Copioglossa pilosa Miers (1863); Dipteracanthus angustifolius (Nees) Linden (1851); Dipteracanthus canescens Nees (1845); Dipteracanthus geminiflorus (Kunth) Nees (1847); Dipteracanthus geminiflorus var. angustifolius Nees (1847); Dipteracanthus geminiflorus var. erectus Nees (1847); Dipteracanthus geminiflorus var. hirsutior Nees (1847); Dipteracanthus geminiflorus var. procumbens Nees (1847); Dipteracanthus geminiflorus var. subacaulis Nees (1847); Dipteracanthus hirsutus Vell. (1829); Dipteracanthus humilis Nees (1847); Dipteracanthus humilis var. diffusus Nees (1847); Dipteracanthus humilis var. minor Nees (1847); Dipteracanthus nanus Nees (1847); Dipteracanthus porrigens Nees (1847); Dipteracanthus porrigens var. triflorus Nees (1847); Dipteracanthus vindex Nees (1847); Gymnacanthus campestris Oerst. (1855); Gymnacanthus geminiflorus (Kunth) Oerst. (1855); Ruellia bicolor Ruiz ex Nees (1847), pro syn.; Ruellia campestris (Oerst.) Hemsl. (1882); Ruellia canescens (Nees) Lindau (1895); Ruellia elliptica Rusby (1900); Ruellia geminiflora f. albiflora Kuntze (1898); Ruellia geminiflora var. angustifolia (Nees) Griseb. (1862); Ruellia geminiflora var. canescens (Nees) Griseb. (1862); Ruellia geminiflora var. hirsutior (Nees) Nees (1847); Ruellia geminiflora var. humilis (Nees) Griseb. (1874); Ruellia geminiflora var. nudipes S.Moore (1895); Ruellia hirsuta Vell. (1829), nom. illeg.; Ruellia hispida Vahl ex Nees (1847), pro syn.; Ruellia humilis (Nees) Lindau (1903), nom. illeg.; Ruellia hypericifolia Rusby (1927); Ruellia lindmaniana Fritsch (1898); Ruellia moritziana Klotzsch ex Nees (1847), pro syn.; Ruellia porrigens Mart. ex Nees (1847), not validly publ.; Ruellia porrigens (Nees) Lindau (1895); Ruellia subacaulis K.Koch & C.D.Bouché (1855); Ruellia vindex (Nees) Lindau (1895); Ulleria angustifolia (Nees) Bremek. (1969); Ulleria geminiflora (Kunth) Bremek. (1969)

= Ruellia geminiflora =

Species of flowering plant

Ruellia geminiflora, known locally as ipecacuanha-da-flor-roxa, is a species native to Argentina; Brazil, typically Caatinga and Cerrado vegetation; Guianas, and Venezuela. The roots of this plant contains possibly toxic substances.
