= Ruellia menthoides =

Scientific classification
- Kingdom: Plantae
- Clade: Tracheophytes
- Clade: Angiosperms
- Clade: Eudicots
- Clade: Asterids
- Order: Lamiales
- Family: Acanthaceae
- Genus: Ruellia
- Species: R. menthoides

Binomial name
- Ruellia menthoides Hiern (1877)

Synonyms
- Dipteracanthus menthoides Nees (1847); Ruellia asema Leonard (1959)

Species of flowering plant

Ruellia menthoides is a species of flowering plant native to northern, eastern, and central Brazil, Bolivia, Peru, and Venezuela. In Brazil it grows in the Cerrado ecoregion. This plant is cited in Flora Brasiliensis by Carl Friedrich Philipp von Martius.
