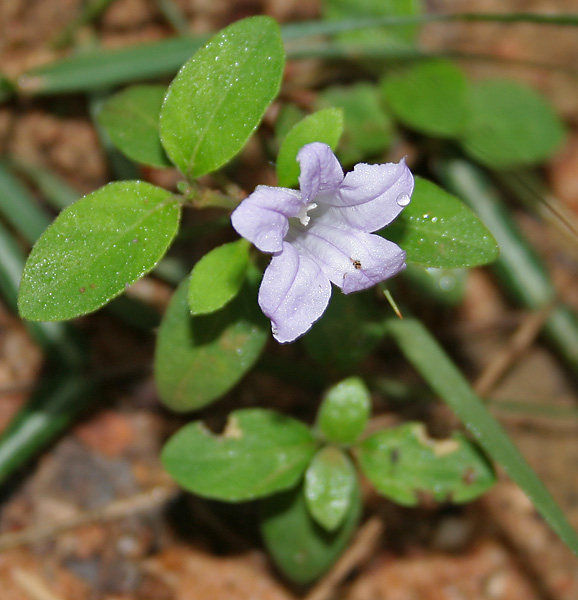

Scientific classification
- Kingdom: Plantae
- Clade: Tracheophytes
- Clade: Angiosperms
- Clade: Eudicots
- Clade: Asterids
- Order: Lamiales
- Family: Acanthaceae
- Genus: Ruellia
- Species: R. prostrata

Binomial name
- Ruellia prostrata Poir.

Synonyms
- Dipteracanthus prostratus (Poir.) Nees; Ruellia patula var. prostrata (Poir.) Chiov.l

= Ruellia prostrata =

Species of flowering plant

Ruellia prostrata is a species of flowering plant in the family Acanthaceae.

== Description ==
Ruellia prostrata is a perennial herb or small shrub growing up to 1.5 m tall, with erect to decumbent stems arising from a woody rootstock. Leaves are ovate to elliptic, 4–9.5 cm long, and shortly to distinctly petiolate. Flowers are mauve or white, solitary or in small axillary cymes. The calyx is deeply five-lobed, and the fruit is a hairy, many-seeded capsule.

== Distribution ==
It is native to Angola, Bangladesh, Botswana, Caprivi Strip, Central African Republic, the Christmas Islands, Eritrea, Eswatini (previously known as Swaziland), Ethiopia, India, Jawa, Kenya, the Laccadive Islands, Madagascar, Malawi, Malaya, Mozambique, Namibia, New Caledonia, New Guinea, Northern Provinces, Oman, Pakistan, Saudi Arabia, the Solomon Islands, Somalia, Sri Lanka, Sudan-South Sudan, Tanzania, Uganda, Vanuatu, Wallis-Futuna Islands, Yemen, Zambia and Zimbabwe.

== Uses ==
Antioxidant activity of Ruellia prostrata has been documented in several studies.,. In addition, both aqueous and alcoholic extracts of R. prostrata have been reported to exhibit anti-inflammatory properties,,. Phytochemical analysis of Ruellia prostrata has shown the presence of various bioactive compounds, including saponins, flavonoids, phenols, terpenoids, tannins, and glycosides.
