= Ruellia asperula =

Scientific classification
- Kingdom: Plantae
- Clade: Embryophytes
- Clade: Tracheophytes
- Clade: Spermatophytes
- Clade: Angiosperms
- Clade: Eudicots
- Clade: Asterids
- Order: Lamiales
- Family: Acanthaceae
- Genus: Ruellia
- Species: R. asperula

Binomial name
- Ruellia asperula (Mart. & Nees) Lindau (1895)

Synonyms
- Stephanophysum asperulum Mart. & Nees (1847); Stephanophysum asperulum var. hirsutulum Nees (1847); Stephanophysum asperulum var. majus Nees (1847); Stephanophysum hirsutulum Mart. ex Nees (1847); Stephanophysum hirsutum Mart. ex Nees (1847)

Species of flowering plant

Ruellia asperula (syn. Stephanophysum asperulum Mart. & Nees) is a medicinal plant native to eastern Brazil and grows in Caatinga vegetation and Cerrado vegetation. Flowers, leaves, and roots of this plant are usually macerated and used to treat asthma, bronchitis, fever, flu, and uteral inflammation.
