= Ruellia eriocalyx =

Scientific classification
- Kingdom: Plantae
- Clade: Tracheophytes
- Clade: Angiosperms
- Clade: Eudicots
- Clade: Asterids
- Order: Lamiales
- Family: Acanthaceae
- Genus: Ruellia
- Species: R. eriocalyx

Binomial name
- Ruellia eriocalyx Glaz. ex T.F.Daniel, E.A.Tripp & C.Ezcurra (2023)

Species of flowering plant

Ruellia eriocalyx is a species of flowering plant native to Goiás and Brasília in west-central Brazil, where it grows in the Cerrado ecoregion.
