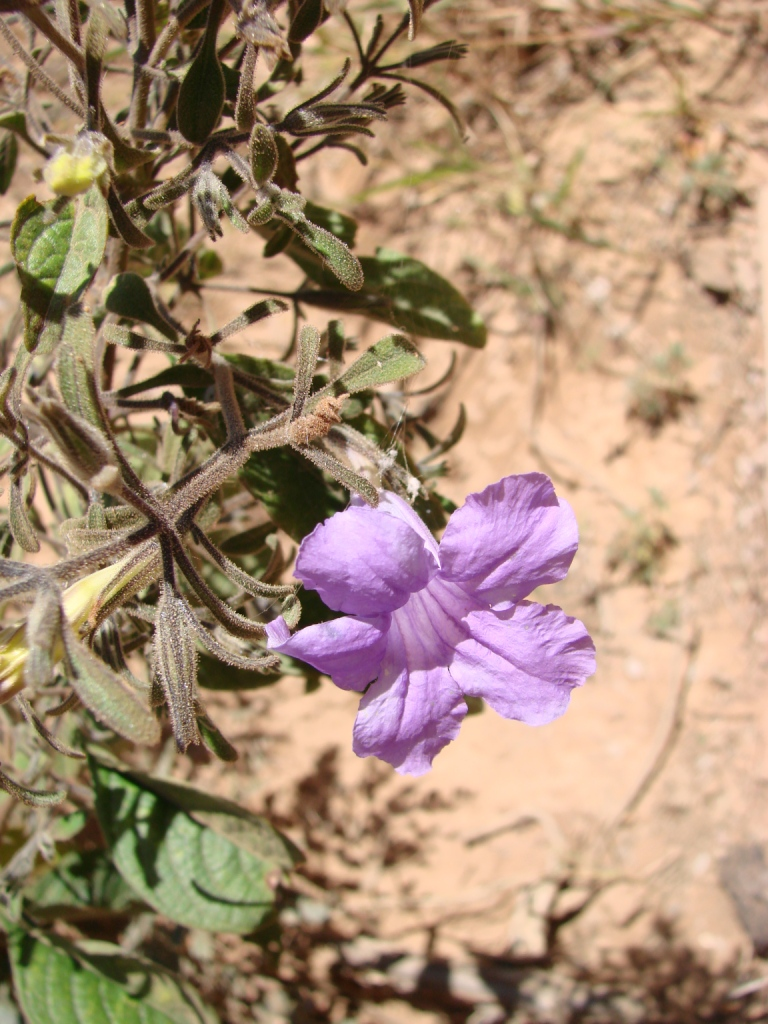

Scientific classification
- Kingdom: Plantae
- Clade: Tracheophytes
- Clade: Angiosperms
- Clade: Eudicots
- Clade: Asterids
- Order: Lamiales
- Family: Acanthaceae
- Genus: Ruellia
- Species: R. incomta

Binomial name
- Ruellia incomta Lindau

Synonyms
- Dipteracanthus incomtus Nees (1847)

= Ruellia incomta =

Species of flowering plant

Ruellia incomta is a species of flowering plant native to the Cerrado ecoregion of central Brazil.
