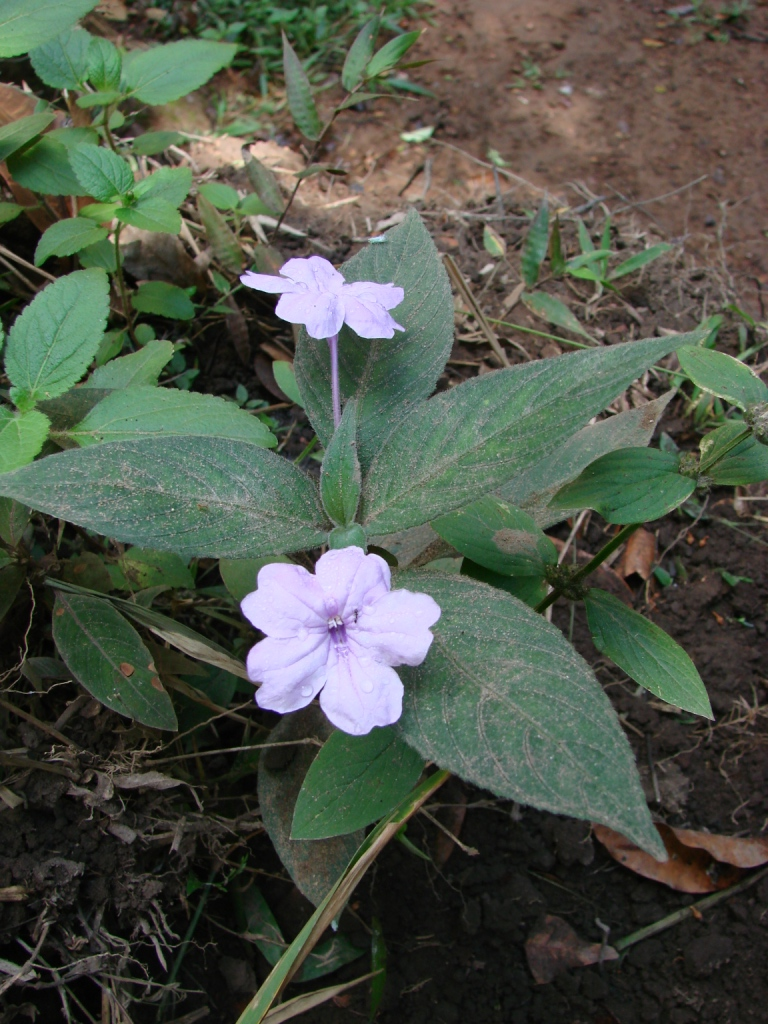

Scientific classification
- Kingdom: Plantae
- Clade: Tracheophytes
- Clade: Angiosperms
- Clade: Eudicots
- Clade: Asterids
- Order: Lamiales
- Family: Acanthaceae
- Genus: Ruellia
- Species: R. jussieuoides

Binomial name
- Ruellia jussieuoides Schltdl. & Cham. (1831)

Synonyms
- Synonymy: Arrhostoxylum achimeniflorum Oerst. (1855); Arrhostoxylum jussieuoides Nees (1847); Dipteracanthus puri Nees (1847); Dipteracanthus puri subvar. ampliflorus Nees (1847); Dipteracanthus puri subvar. angustiflorus (Nees) Nees (1847); Dipteracanthus puri var. angustifolius Nees (1847); Dipteracanthus puri var. gymnocladus Nees (1847); Ruellia achimeniflorum (Oerst.) Hemsl. (1882); Ruellia bangii Rusby (1896); Ruellia lechleri Britton ex Rusby (1900); Ruellia lechleri var. grandifolia Britton ex Rusby (1900); Ruellia puri (Nees) B.D.Jacks. (1893); Ruellia puri var. longipetiolata S.Moore (1895); Tacoanthus pearcei Baill. (1890)

= Ruellia jussieuoides =

Species of flowering plant

Ruellia jussieuoides is a species of flowering plant in the family Acanthaceae. It is a subshrub of the tropical Americas, native to central and southern Mexico and Guatemala, Nicaragua, Costa, Rica, and Panama, and Ecuador, Peru, Bolivia, and West-Central and southeastern Brazil. It is native to the Cerrado ecoregion of Brazil.
