= Ruellia pohlii =

Scientific classification
- Kingdom: Plantae
- Clade: Tracheophytes
- Clade: Angiosperms
- Clade: Eudicots
- Clade: Asterids
- Order: Lamiales
- Family: Acanthaceae
- Genus: Ruellia
- Species: R. pohlii

Binomial name
- Ruellia pohlii (Nees) E.A.Tripp & T.F.Daniel (2023)

Synonyms
- Dipteracanthus pohlii Nees (1847)

Species of flowering plant

Ruellia pohlii (syn. Dipteracanthus pohlii Nees) is a plant native to Goias state in the Cerrado ecoregion of west-central Brazil. This plant is cited in Flora Brasiliensis by Carl Friedrich Philipp von Martius.
