= Ruellia bahiensis =

Scientific classification
- Kingdom: Plantae
- Clade: Tracheophytes
- Clade: Angiosperms
- Clade: Eudicots
- Clade: Asterids
- Order: Lamiales
- Family: Acanthaceae
- Genus: Ruellia
- Species: R. bahiensis

Binomial name
- Ruellia bahiensis (Nees) Morong (1893)

Synonyms
- Dipteracanthus bahiensis Nees (1847); Ruellia trivialis Blanch. ex Nees (1847)

Species of flowering plant

Ruellia bahiensis is a species of flowering plant in the family Acanthaceae. It is a subshrub native to eastern and southern Brazil, where it grows in the Cerrado ecoregion.
