= Ruellia multifolia =

Scientific classification
- Kingdom: Plantae
- Clade: Tracheophytes
- Clade: Angiosperms
- Clade: Eudicots
- Clade: Asterids
- Order: Lamiales
- Family: Acanthaceae
- Genus: Ruellia
- Species: R. multifolia

Binomial name
- Ruellia multifolia (Nees) Lindau (1895)

Varieties
- Ruellia multifolia var. multifolia; Ruellia multifolia var. viscosissima (Nees) C.Ezcurra

Synonyms
- Dipteracanthus multifolius Nees (1847)

Species of flowering plant

Ruellia multifolia is a species of flowering plant in the family Acanthaceae. It is a perennial or subshrub native to west-central, southern, and southeastern Brazil, northeastern Argentina, and Paraguay.

Two varieties are accepted:

- Ruellia multifolia var. multifolia (synonyms Dipteracanthus multifolius var. multiflorus Nees and Ruellia subdentata Klotzsch ex Nees) – west-central, southern, and southeastern Brazil, northeastern Argentina, and Paraguay
- Ruellia multifolia var. viscosissima (Nees) C.Ezcurra (synonyms Dipteracanthus viscosissimus Nees, Ruellia viscosissima (Nees) Lindau, Dipteracanthus glandulosopunctatus Nees, and Ruellia glandulosopunctata (Nees) Lindau) – southern Brazil, northeastern Argentina, and Paraguay
