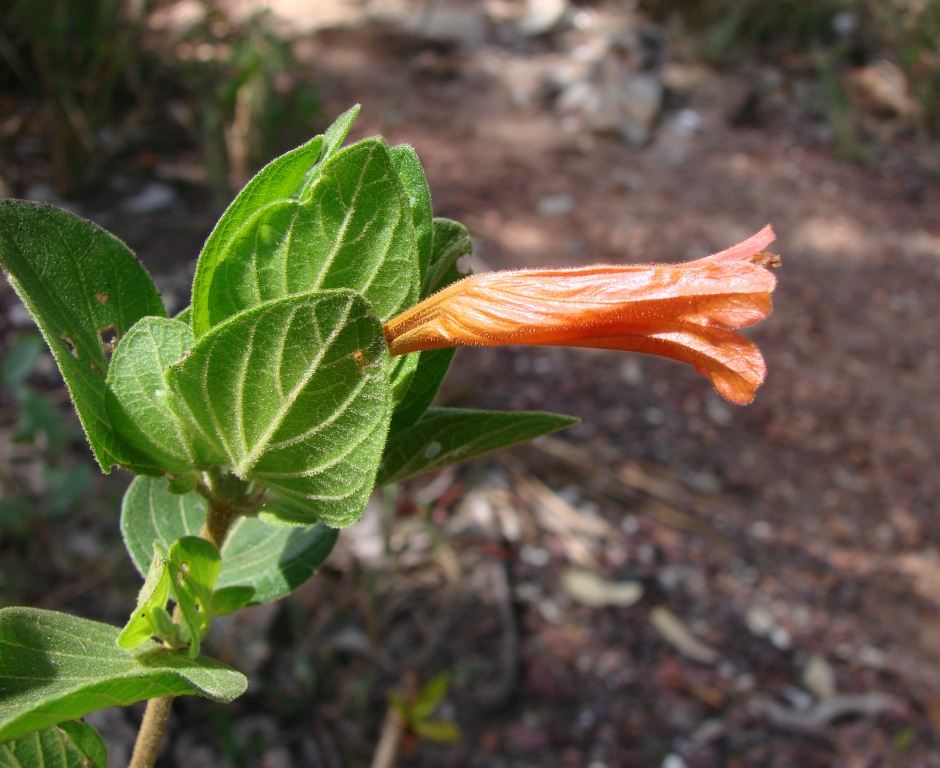

Scientific classification
- Kingdom: Plantae
- Clade: Tracheophytes
- Clade: Angiosperms
- Clade: Eudicots
- Clade: Asterids
- Order: Lamiales
- Family: Acanthaceae
- Genus: Ruellia
- Species: R. villosa

Binomial name
- Ruellia villosa (Nees) Lindau (1895)

Synonyms
- Dicliptera villosa Mart. ex Nees (1847), pro syn.; Justicia villosa Mart. ex Nees (1847), pro syn.; Ruellia diffusa (Nees) Lindau (1895), nom. illeg.; Siphonacanthus diffusus Nees (1847); Siphonacanthus villosus Nees (1847)

= Ruellia villosa =

Species of flowering plant

Ruellia villosa is a species of flowering plant native to the Cerrado ecoregion of central and eastern Brazil. This plant is cited in Flora Brasiliensis by Carl Friedrich Philipp von Martius.
