= Ruellia dielsii =

Conservation status
- Data Deficient (IUCN 3.1)

Scientific classification
- Kingdom: Plantae
- Clade: Embryophytes
- Clade: Tracheophytes
- Clade: Angiosperms
- Clade: Eudicots
- Clade: Asterids
- Order: Lamiales
- Family: Acanthaceae
- Genus: Ruellia
- Species: R. dielsii

Binomial name
- Ruellia dielsii Mildbr.

Species of flowering plant

Ruellia dielsii is a species of flowering plant in the family Acanthaceae. It is endemic to Ecuador. Its natural habitat is subtropical or tropical moist montane forests.
