= Ruellia acutangula =

Scientific classification
- Kingdom: Plantae
- Clade: Tracheophytes
- Clade: Angiosperms
- Clade: Eudicots
- Clade: Asterids
- Order: Lamiales
- Family: Acanthaceae
- Genus: Ruellia
- Species: R. acutangula

Binomial name
- Ruellia acutangula Nees ex Mart.

Species of flowering plant

Ruellia acutangula is a plant native to the Cerrado vegetation of Brazil.
