= Ruellia hypericoides =

Scientific classification
- Kingdom: Plantae
- Clade: Tracheophytes
- Clade: Angiosperms
- Clade: Eudicots
- Clade: Asterids
- Order: Lamiales
- Family: Acanthaceae
- Genus: Ruellia
- Species: R. hypericoides

Binomial name
- Ruellia hypericoides (Nees) Lindau (1894)

Synonyms
- Dipteracanthus hypericoides Nees (1847)

Species of flowering plant

Ruellia hypericoides is a species of flowering plant native to southern Paraguay, southern Brazil, northeastern Argentina, and Uruguay. This plant is cited in Flora Brasiliensis by Carl Friedrich Philipp von Martius.
