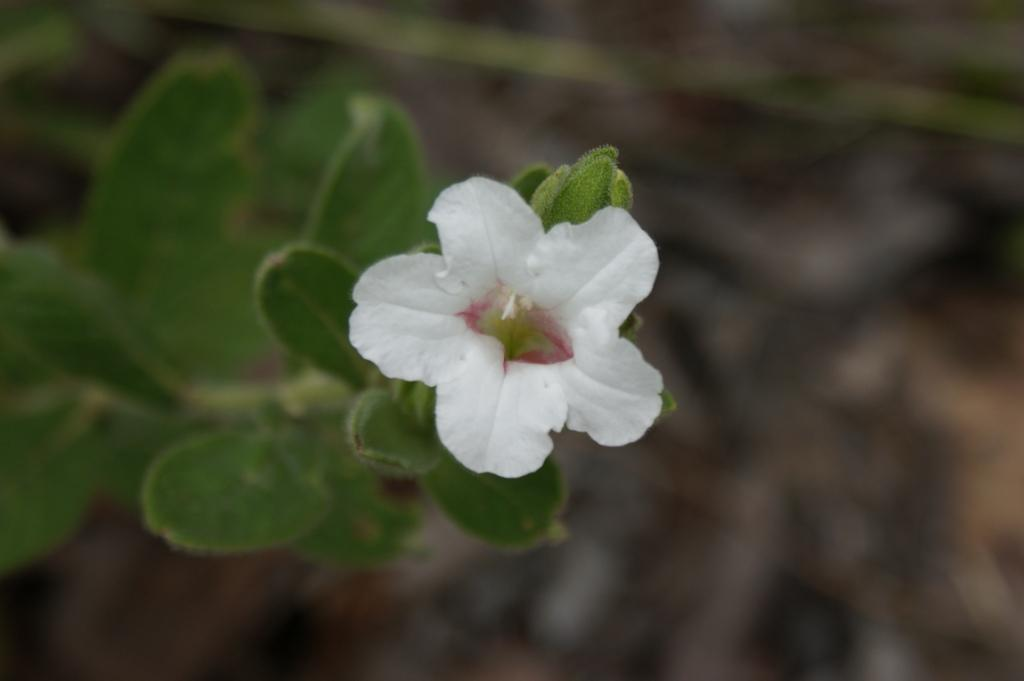

Scientific classification
- Kingdom: Plantae
- Clade: Tracheophytes
- Clade: Angiosperms
- Clade: Eudicots
- Clade: Asterids
- Order: Lamiales
- Family: Acanthaceae
- Genus: Ruellia
- Species: R. nitens

Binomial name
- Ruellia nitens (Nees) Wassh.

Synonyms
- Dipteracanthus nitens Nees (1847); Ruellia goyazensis Lindau (1898)

= Ruellia nitens =

Species of flowering plant

Ruellia nitens is a species of flowering plant native to the Cerrado vegetation of central and northeastern Brazil. This plant is cited in Flora Brasiliensis by Carl Friedrich Philipp von Martius.
