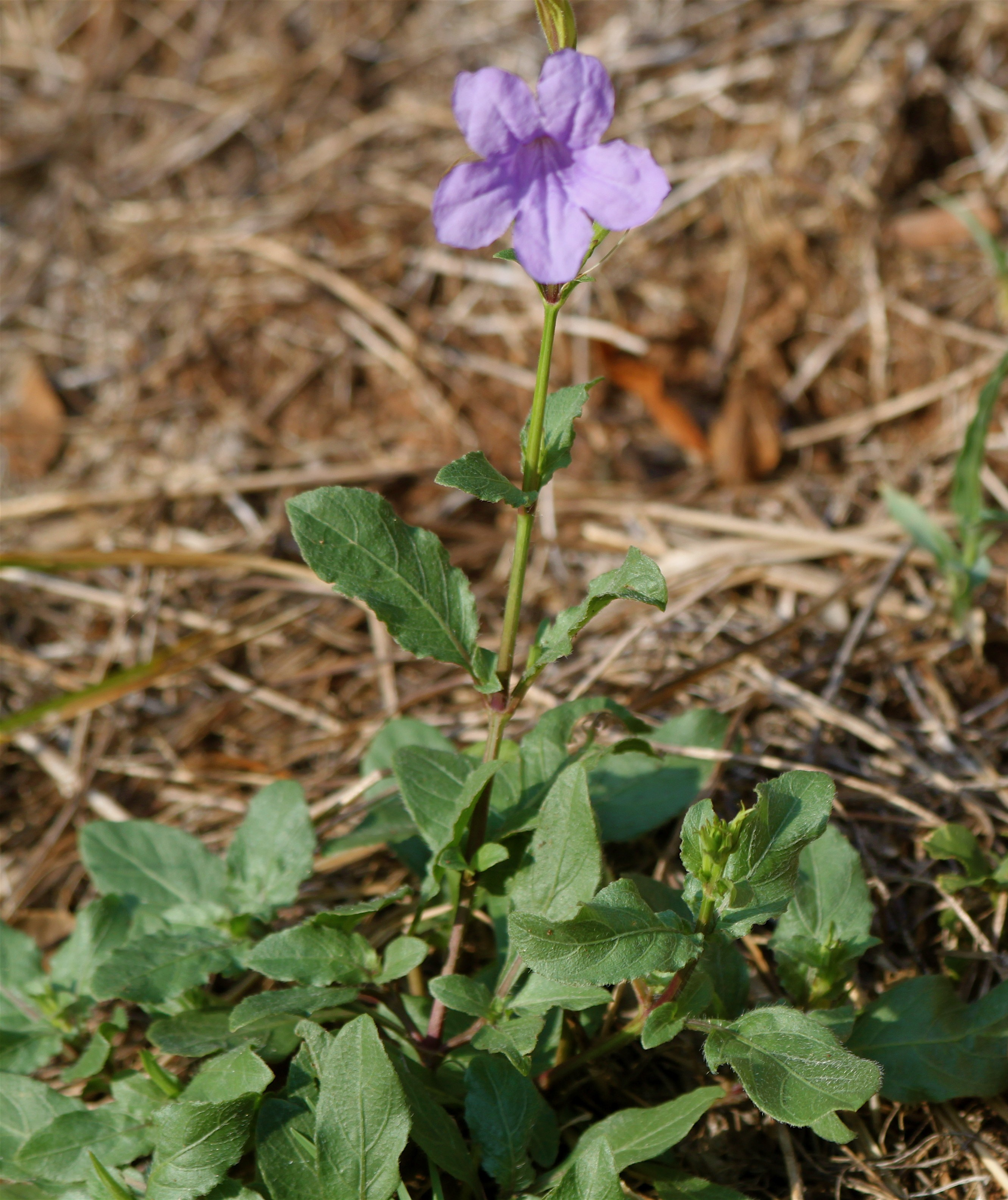

Scientific classification
- Kingdom: Plantae
- Clade: Tracheophytes
- Clade: Angiosperms
- Clade: Eudicots
- Clade: Asterids
- Order: Lamiales
- Family: Acanthaceae
- Genus: Ruellia
- Species: R. nudiflora

Binomial name
- Ruellia nudiflora (Engelm. & A.Gray) Urb.

= Ruellia nudiflora =

Species of flowering plant

Ruellia nudiflora, the violet ruellia or violet wild petunia, is a perennial plant in the acanthus family (Acanthaceae) found in North America. Despite the genus Ruellia being known as the wild petunias, they are not true petunias and are not closely related to them. The species thrives in disturbed areas and can sometimes be considered a weed.

== Description ==
R. nudiflora is a perennial herb that grows 1 to 2 feet tall. It has lavender or purple flowers, which are trumpet-shaped and about 2 inches in diameter. Leaves are grayish green, pinnate, and opposite, growing about 2 to 5 inches in length. It typically blooms from April to October.

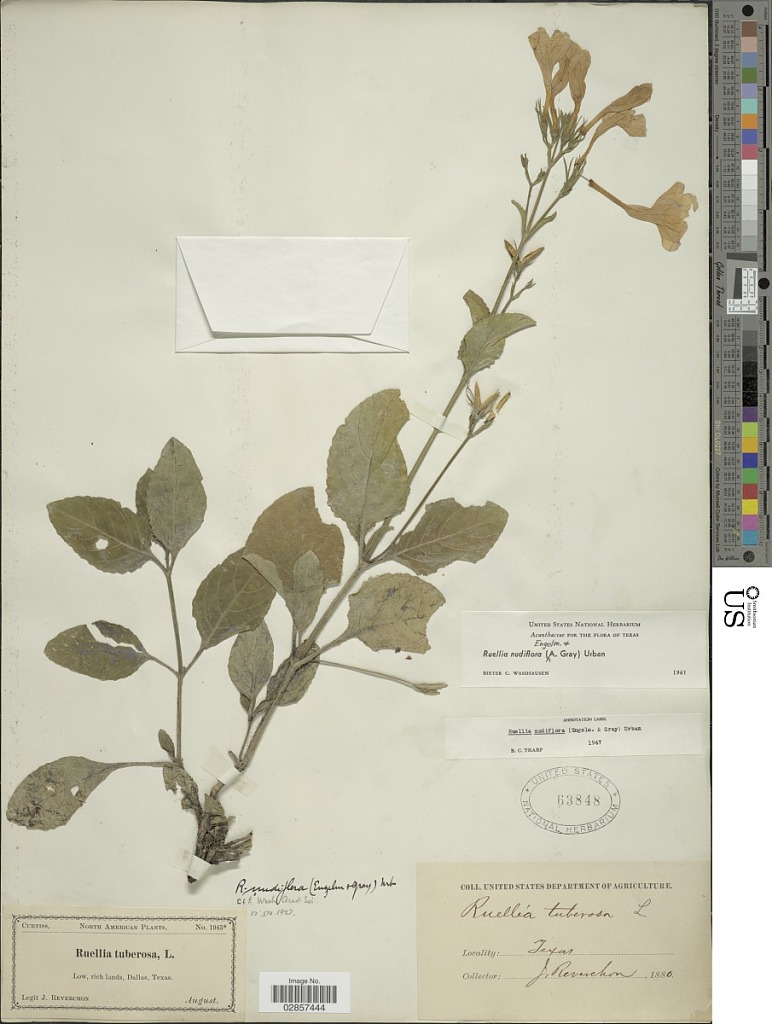
Pressed specimen of Ruellia nudiflora in the botany collection of the Smithsonian National Museum of Natural History (1886). Originally miscategorized as Ruellia tuberosa.

== Distribution and ecology ==
The boundary between the native range and invasive range of R. nudiflora is not fully understood. The species is found in Texas in the United States, throughout Mexico and Central America, and in the Caribbean. It has invasive properties in the Caribbean islands and some regions of Mexico, especially the Yucatán Peninsula, where it is considered a weed.

R. nudiflora is a ruderal species and does well in disturbed environments, making it common along roadsides and in areas of human activity. It has been known to adapt to its local surroundings to survive. It can also thrive in regions with varying levels of precipitation, depth, and soil pH, and the species can be found in a variety of habitats, including areas of moisture in the Sonoran Desert.
