= Ruellia eurycodon =

Scientific classification
- Kingdom: Plantae
- Clade: Tracheophytes
- Clade: Angiosperms
- Clade: Eudicots
- Clade: Asterids
- Order: Lamiales
- Family: Acanthaceae
- Genus: Ruellia
- Species: R. eurycodon

Binomial name
- Ruellia eurycodon Lindau (1898)

Synonyms
- Stephanophysum flavum Nees (1847)

Species of flowering plant

Ruellia eurycodon is a species of flowering plant native to the Cerrado ecoregion of west-central Brazil.
