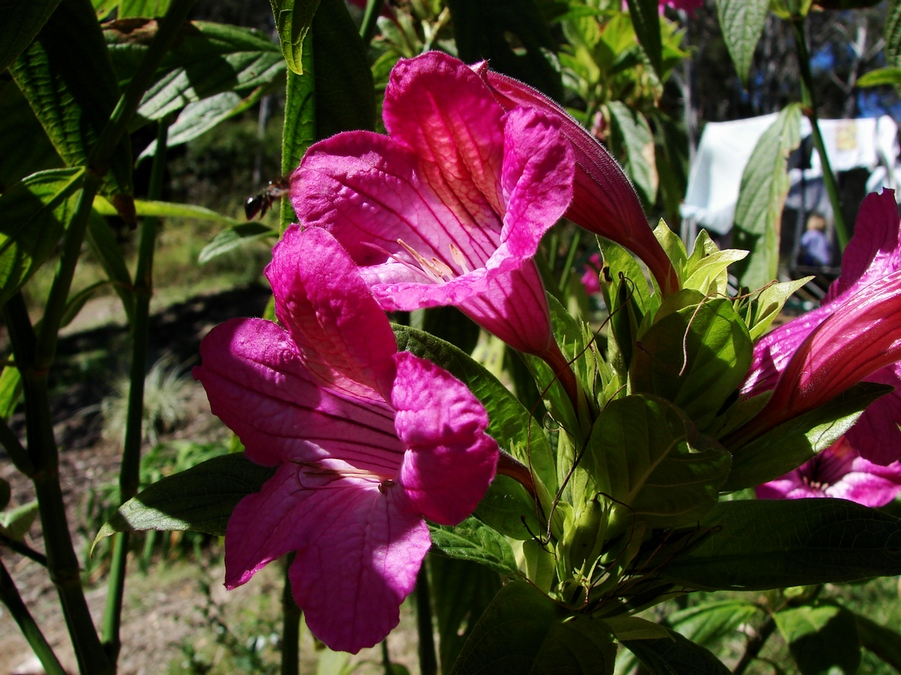

Scientific classification
- Kingdom: Plantae
- Clade: Tracheophytes
- Clade: Angiosperms
- Clade: Eudicots
- Clade: Asterids
- Order: Lamiales
- Family: Acanthaceae
- Genus: Ruellia
- Species: R. macrantha

Binomial name
- Ruellia macrantha (Nees) Van Houtte (1878-1879 publ. 1878)

Synonyms
- Bignonia elliptica Thunb. (1821); Dipteracanthus macranthus Nees (1847); Dipteracanthus speciosus C.Presl (1845); Ruellia magnifica Mart. ex Nees (1847), not validly publ.; Ruellia speciosa Schott ex Nees (1847), not validly publ.

= Ruellia macrantha =

Christmas pride

Species of flowering plant

Ruellia macrantha, or Christmas pride, is a species of flowering plant native to the cerrado vegetation of Brazil. It is often used as an ornamental plant. This plant is cited in Flora Brasiliensis by Carl Friedrich Philipp von Martius.
