= Ruellia drummondiana =

Scientific classification
- Kingdom: Plantae
- Clade: Tracheophytes
- Clade: Angiosperms
- Clade: Eudicots
- Clade: Asterids
- Order: Lamiales
- Family: Acanthaceae
- Genus: Ruellia
- Species: R. drummondiana

Binomial name
- Ruellia drummondiana (Nees) A.Gray
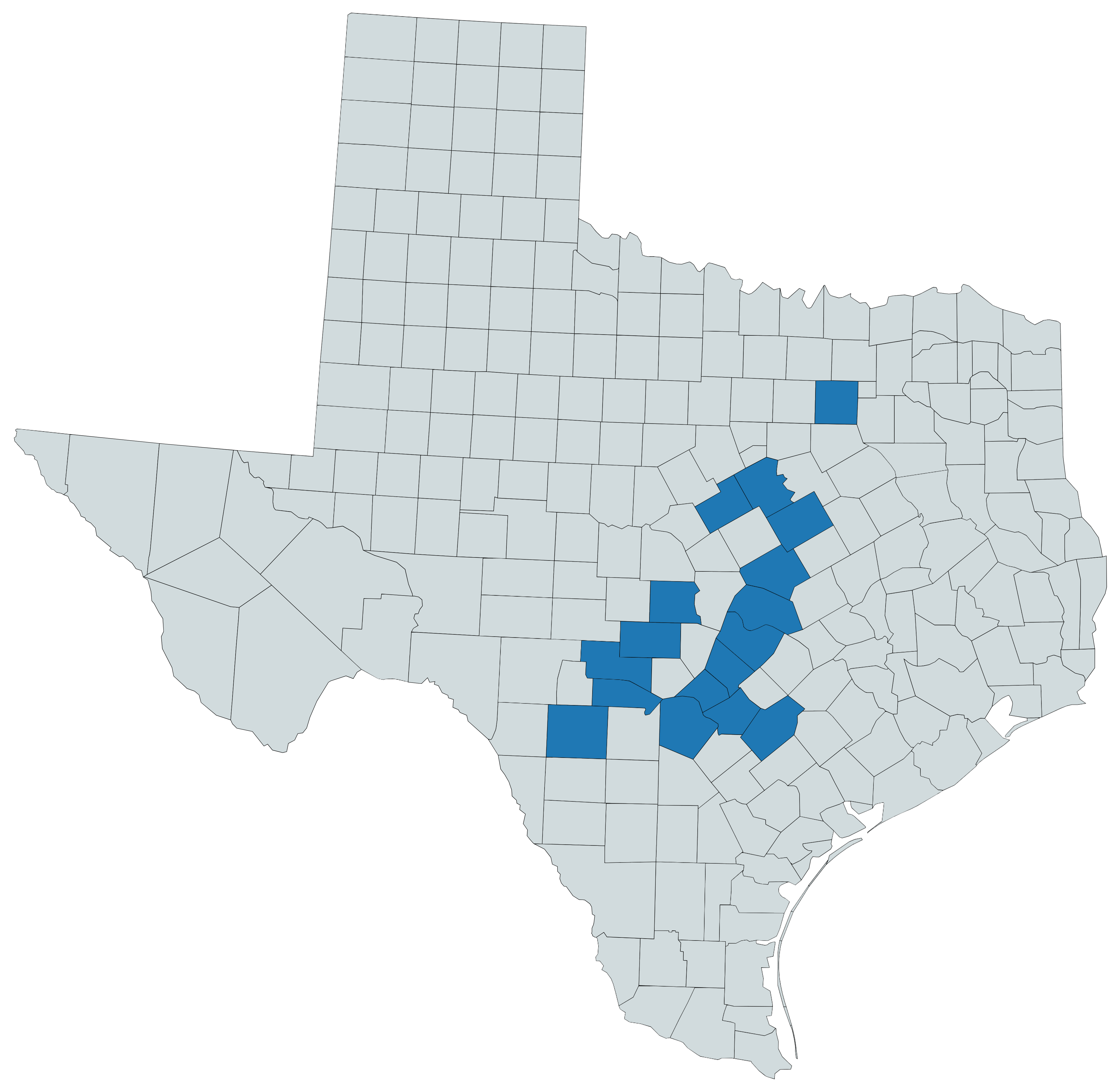
- Range of Ruellia drummondiana

Species of flowering plant

Ruellia drummondiana (syn. Dipteracanthus drummondianus Nees), also known as Drummond's wild petunia, is a flowering plant endemic to central Texas in the United States. It was first collected by naturalist Thomas Drummond and first described in 1847. R. drummondiana stands up to 3' with an herbaceous dark green ridged stem and purple flowers. Unlike the majority of Ruellia in the United States, R. drummondiana produces fruit with only 2–4 seeds, as opposed to 6–20 as is common throughout the genus.
