= Ruellia trachyphylla =

Scientific classification
- Kingdom: Plantae
- Clade: Embryophytes
- Clade: Tracheophytes
- Clade: Spermatophytes
- Clade: Angiosperms
- Clade: Eudicots
- Clade: Asterids
- Order: Lamiales
- Family: Acanthaceae
- Genus: Ruellia
- Species: R. trachyphylla

Binomial name
- Ruellia trachyphylla Lindau (1898)

Species of plant

Ruellia trachyphylla is a species of flowering plant native to the Cerrado ecoregion in west-central Brazil.
