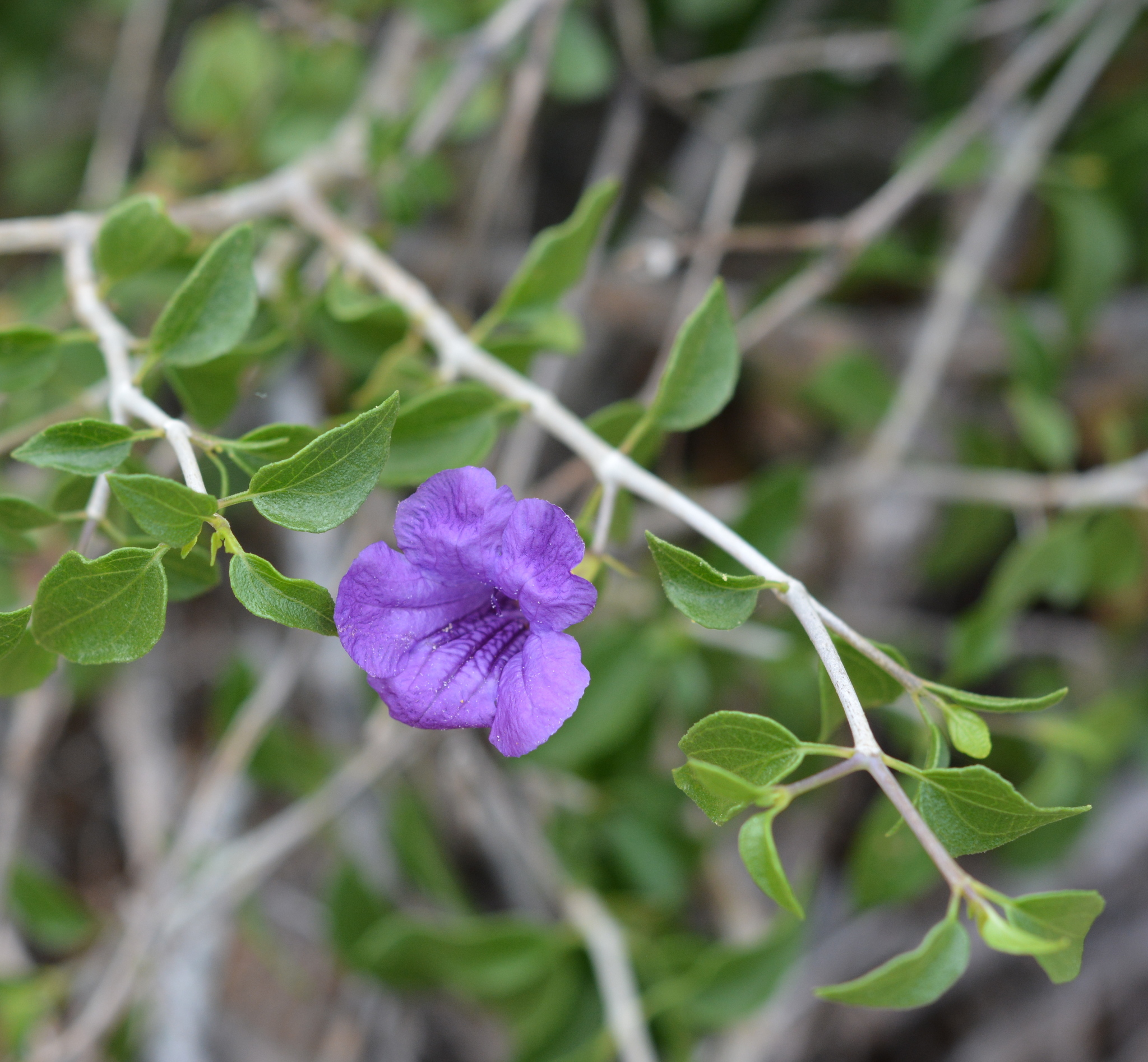
- Subspecies peninsularis in bloom.

Scientific classification
- Kingdom: Plantae
- Clade: Tracheophytes
- Clade: Angiosperms
- Clade: Eudicots
- Clade: Asterids
- Order: Lamiales
- Family: Acanthaceae
- Genus: Ruellia
- Species: R. californica

Binomial name
- Ruellia californica (Vasey & Rose) I.M.Johnst.

Synonyms
- Calophanes californica Vasey & Rose, Contr. U.S. Natl. Herb. 1: 85 (1890)

= Ruellia californica =

Species of plant

Ruellia californica is a species of flowering plant in the Acanthus family commonly known as the rama parda or flor del campo. This evergreen shrub is native to the Baja California peninsula and neighboring coastal Sonora. It is characterized by showy, funnelform blue-purple flowers that bloom throughout the year. There are two subspecies, one endemic to Baja California Sur, and they primarily differ in their presence or absence of hairs on their foliage. This plant is cultivated as an ornamental, and is used to provide a colorful accent to desert and dry gardens.

== Description ==
This species is a perennial shrub to 1.5 m (4.9 ft) tall. The foliage consists of ovate to lanceolate to elliptic leaves that are cuneate to rounded at their base. In subspecies californica, the leaves have mostly glandular trichomes. In subspecies peninsularis, the trichomes are absent, with the leaves glossy and smooth, but sticky.

The flower is funnelform and measures 3–5 cm (1.2–2.0 in) long, the calyx divided into five parts, and the corolla a blue-purple with yellow markings in the throat, with 4 stamens. The mature fruits expel the seeds and disperse them in a rapid explosion when wet.

== Distribution and habitat ==
This species is native to the Baja California peninsula and neighboring coastal Sonora in Mexico. Subspecies californica has the widest distribution, from Bahía de los Ángeles in Baja California to the southern Cape region of Baja California Sur, and on the neighboring Gulf of California islands and western central Sonora. Subspecies peninsularis is endemic to Baja California Sur, and is found from the Sierra de la Giganta and Comondú south to the Cape region.

Both subspecies are usually found growing on dry, gravelly slopes and along bajadas, hillsides, rocky washes, arroyos, and canyons. They are often the only plants in bloom during dry parts of the year.

== Gallery ==
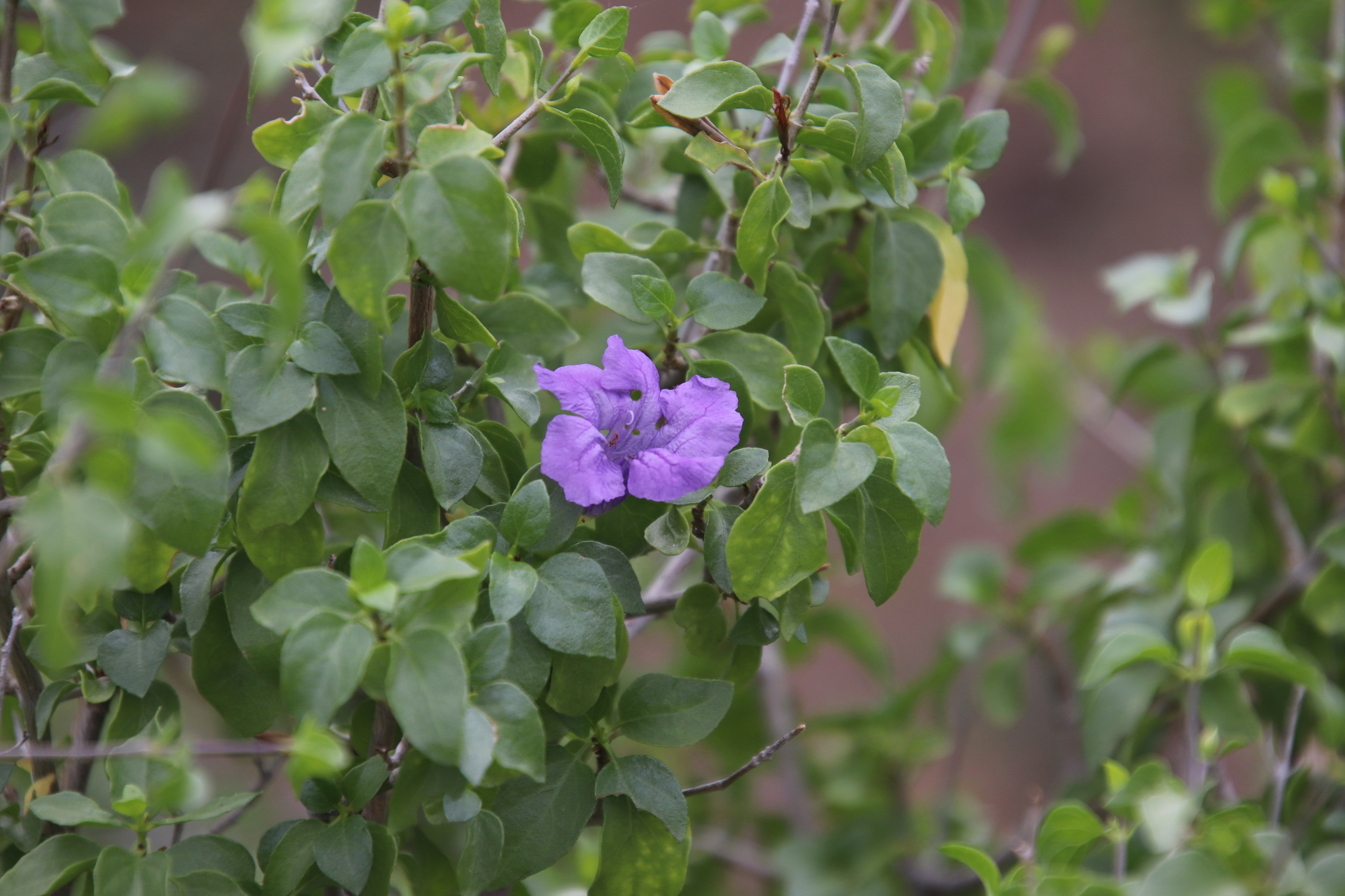
Subspecies peninsularis in habitat

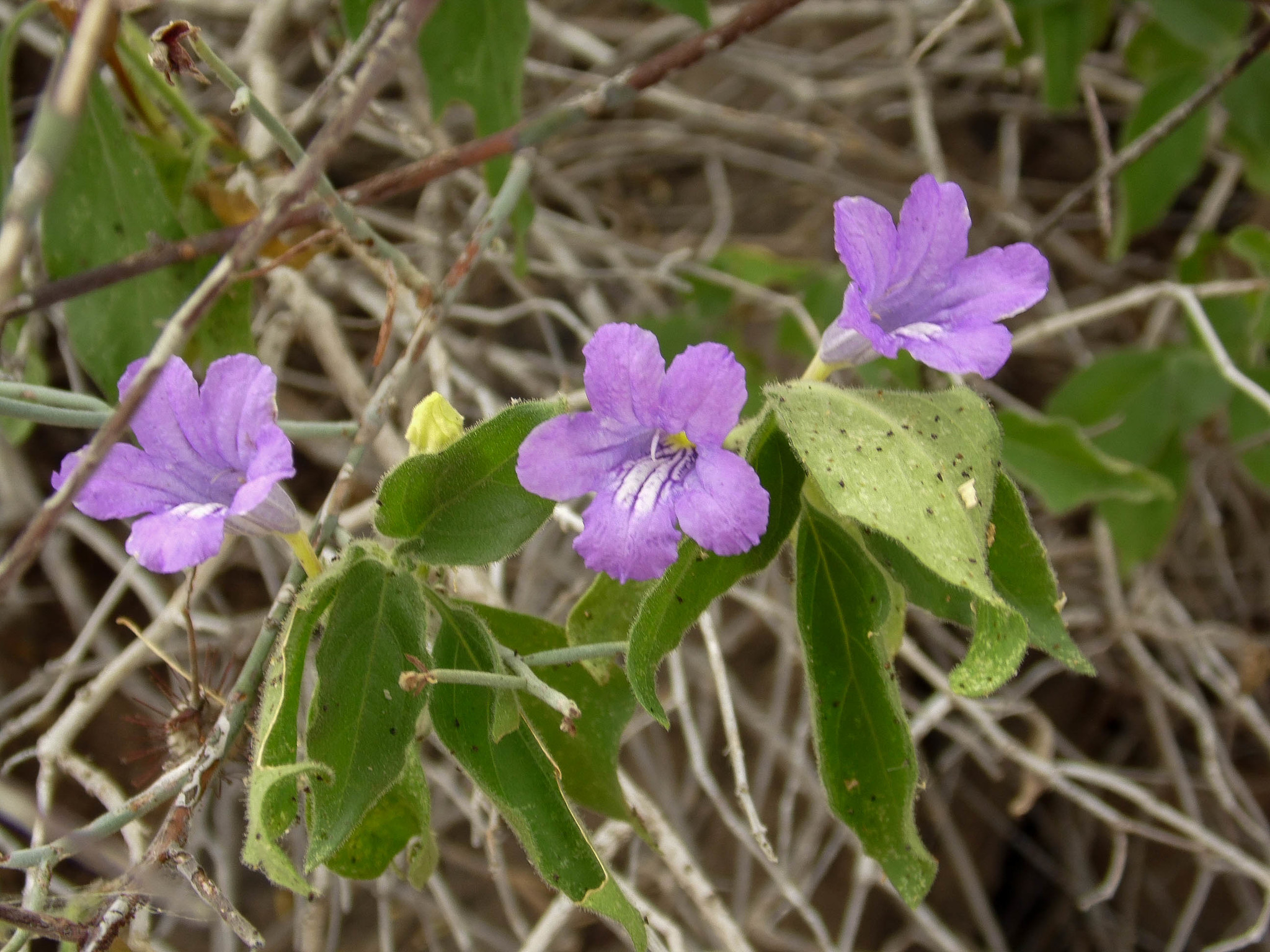
The flowers and foliage of subsp. californica

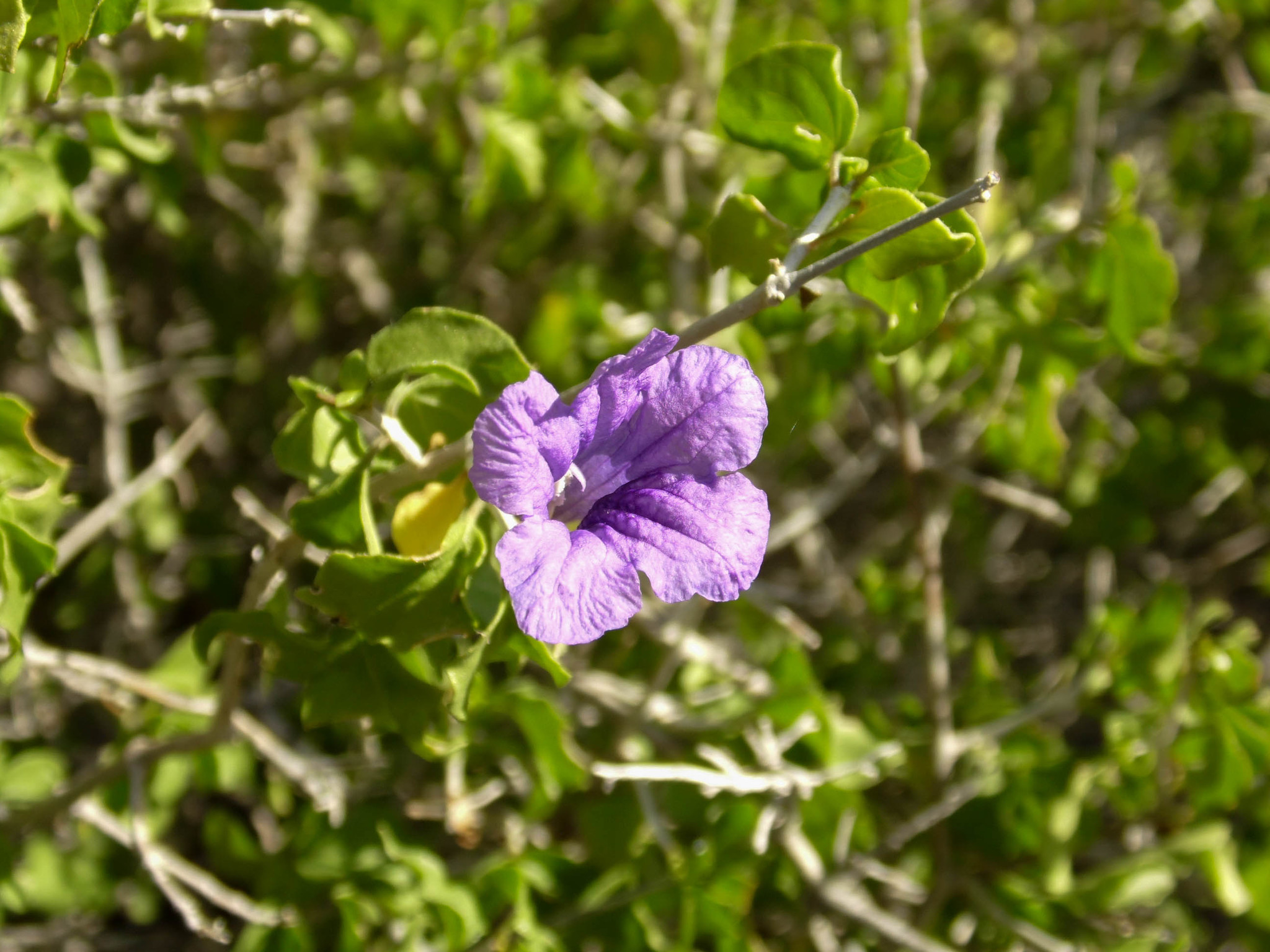
Detail of a flower in habitat

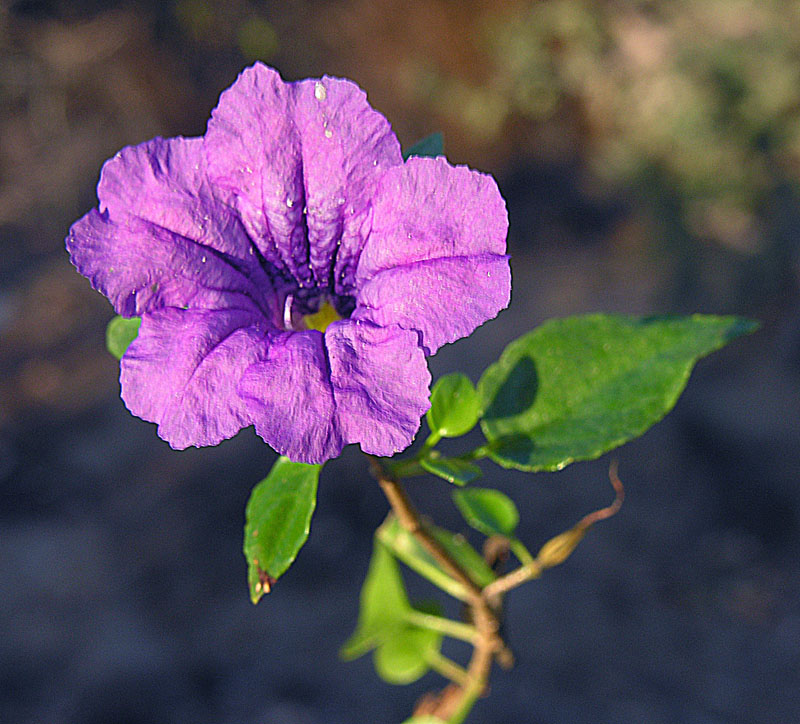
A flower of subsp. peninsularis

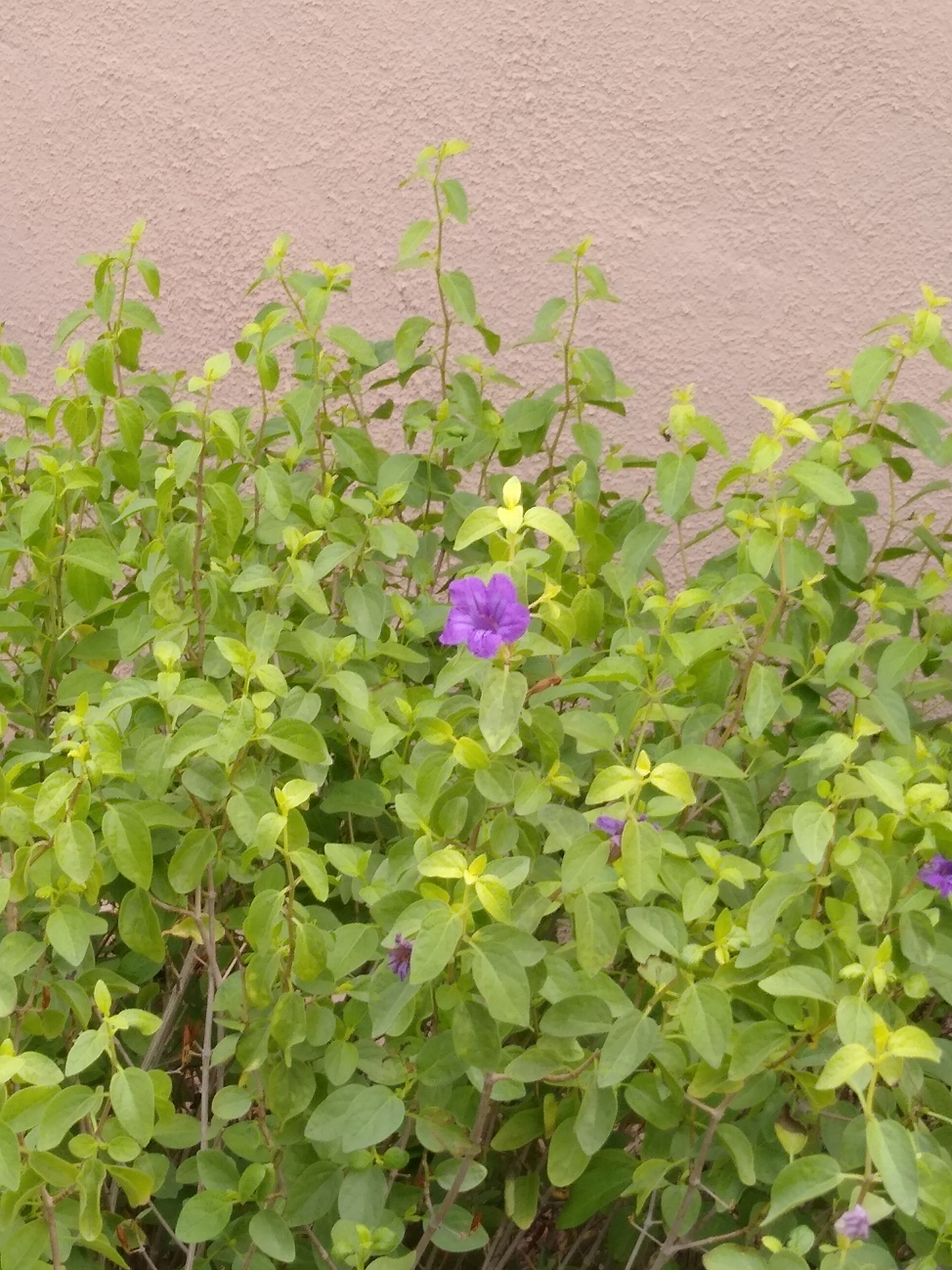
subsp. peninsularis in cultivation
