= Ruellia helianthema =

Scientific classification
- Kingdom: Plantae
- Clade: Tracheophytes
- Clade: Angiosperms
- Clade: Eudicots
- Clade: Asterids
- Order: Lamiales
- Family: Acanthaceae
- Genus: Ruellia
- Species: R. helianthema

Binomial name
- Ruellia helianthema (Nees) Profice (2010)

Synonyms
- Dipteracanthus helianthemum Nees (1847)

Species of flowering plant

Ruellia helianthema is a species of flowering plant native to Bahia state of northeastern Brazil, where it grows in the Cerrado ecoregion.
