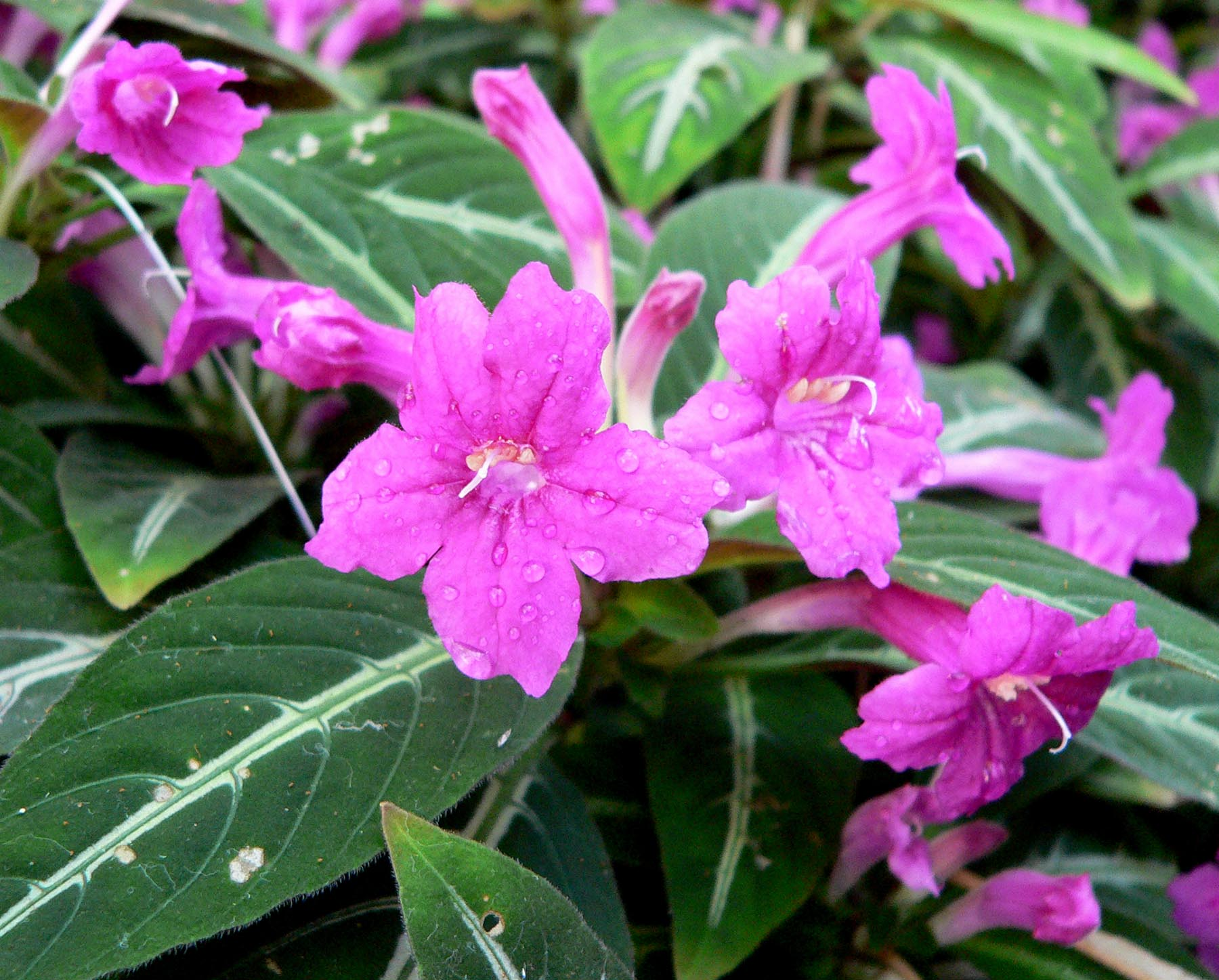
- R. makoyana, Balboa Park (San Diego)

Scientific classification
- Kingdom: Plantae
- Clade: Tracheophytes
- Clade: Angiosperms
- Clade: Eudicots
- Clade: Asterids
- Order: Lamiales
- Family: Acanthaceae
- Genus: Ruellia
- Species: R. makoyana

Binomial name
- Ruellia makoyana Hort.Makoy ex Closon

= Ruellia makoyana =

Species of flowering plant

Ruellia makoyana, the monkey plant or trailing velvet plant, is a species of flowering plant in the family Acanthaceae, native to Brazil. It is an evergreen perennial growing to 60 cm (24 in) tall by 45 cm (18 in) wide, with white-veined hairy leaves and trumpet-shaped pink flowers in summer.

With a minimum temperature of 12 °C (54 °F), in temperate regions R. makoyana is grown indoors as a houseplant. It has gained the Royal Horticultural Society's Award of Garden Merit.
