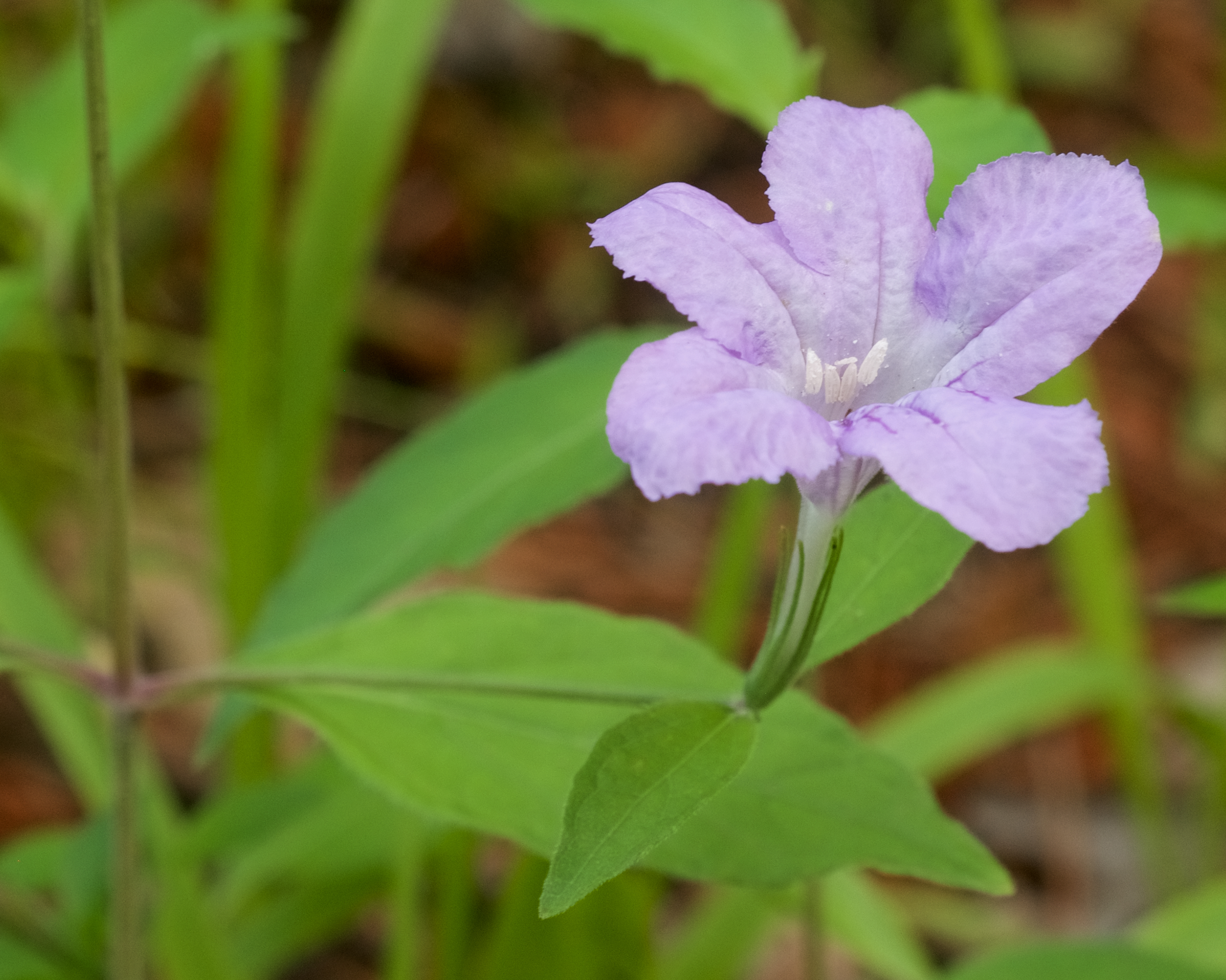

Scientific classification
- Kingdom: Plantae
- Clade: Tracheophytes
- Clade: Angiosperms
- Clade: Eudicots
- Clade: Asterids
- Order: Lamiales
- Family: Acanthaceae
- Genus: Ruellia
- Species: R. pedunculata

Binomial name
- Ruellia pedunculata Torr. ex A.Gray

= Ruellia pedunculata =

Species of flowering plant

Ruellia pedunculata, the stalked wild petunia, is a wild petunia with blue or violet flowers that appear in the spring. Its leaves are light green. This species is native to the southeastern United States.
