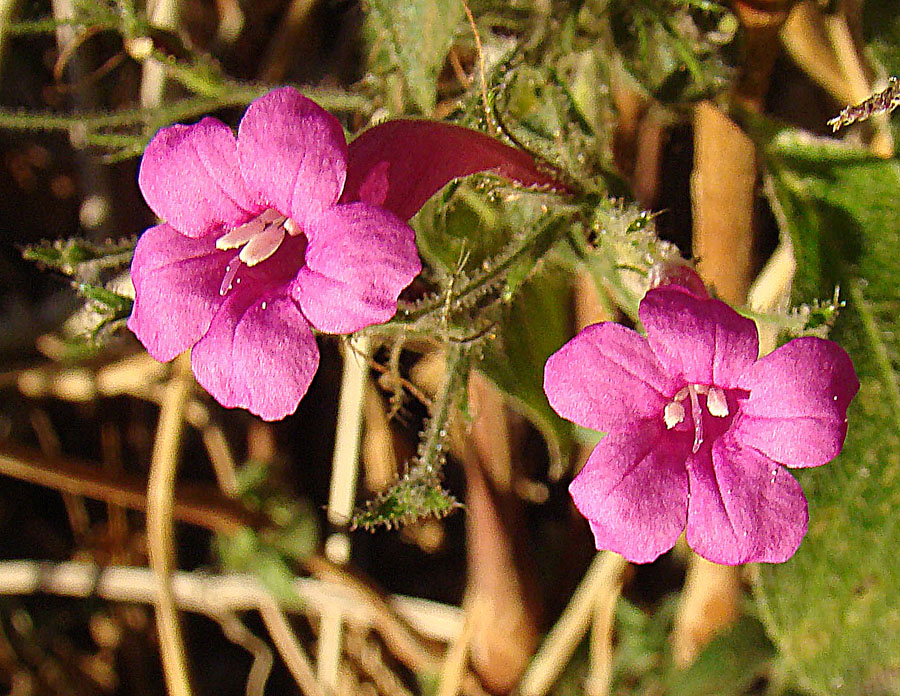

Scientific classification
- Kingdom: Plantae
- Clade: Tracheophytes
- Clade: Angiosperms
- Clade: Eudicots
- Clade: Asterids
- Order: Lamiales
- Family: Acanthaceae
- Genus: Ruellia
- Species: R. inundata

Binomial name
- Ruellia inundata Kunth

Synonyms
- Aphragmia inundata Kunth Bremek. & Nann.-Bremek. (1849); Aphragmia haenkei Nees (1836); Dipteracanthus haenkei Nees (1847); Ruellia albicans Bertero ex Nees (1847); Ruellia paniculata Vahl ex Nees (1847); Ruellia rhamnifolia Willd. ex Nees (1847)

= Ruellia inundata =

Species of flowering plant

Ruellia inundata is a subshrub plant, in the genus Ruellia, family Acanthaceae and is a perennial herbaceous plant first described by the German botanist Carl Sigismund Kunth.

A plant whose distribution occurs in North and South America, especially in the regions of Mexico, Colombia and Brazil is not endemic to its germination.

== Description ==
This plant features erect or sometimes trailing stems. Its leaves are held on short stalks, less than two inches long, and have a soft, hairy texture. The leaf itself can be oval, egg-shaped, or broader at the tip, tapering to either a pointed or rounded base.

It produces clusters of pink flowers that emerge from the leaf axils, each cluster accompanied by small, leafy bracts. The flowers have a distinctive shape: a narrow tube that flares open into a wider, trumpet-like bell, with the petals often curling backwards. The stamens are tucked neatly inside the flower and do not protrude.

The fruit is a unique, club-shaped capsule that, when ripe, splits open to release its seeds—up to four per pod—while the central core remains intact.

The inflorescence consists of branches, consisting of dense, capitate clusters. The fruits are dry, club-shaped, up to 1 cm long. Flowering: November–June.
