= Ruellia rufipila =

Scientific classification
- Kingdom: Plantae
- Clade: Tracheophytes
- Clade: Angiosperms
- Clade: Eudicots
- Clade: Asterids
- Order: Lamiales
- Family: Acanthaceae
- Genus: Ruellia
- Species: R. rufipila

Binomial name
- Ruellia rufipila Rizzini (1956)

Species of flowering plant

Ruellia rufipila is a species of flowering plant native west-central Brazil, where it grows in the Cerrado ecoregion.
