= Ruellia currorii =

Conservation status
- Least Concern (IUCN 3.1)

Scientific classification
- Kingdom: Plantae
- Clade: Tracheophytes
- Clade: Angiosperms
- Clade: Eudicots
- Clade: Asterids
- Order: Lamiales
- Family: Acanthaceae
- Genus: Ruellia
- Species: R. currorii

Binomial name
- Ruellia currorii T.Anderson

Species of flowering plant

Ruellia currorii is a species of plant in the family Acanthaceae. It is found in Angola and Namibia. Its natural habitat is cold desert.
