= Ruellia verbasciformis =

Scientific classification
- Kingdom: Plantae
- Clade: Tracheophytes
- Clade: Angiosperms
- Clade: Eudicots
- Clade: Asterids
- Order: Lamiales
- Family: Acanthaceae
- Genus: Ruellia
- Species: R. verbasciformis

Binomial name
- Ruellia verbasciformis (Nees) C.Ezcurra & Zappi (1996)

Synonyms
- Eurychanes verbasciformis Nees (1847)

Species of flowering plant

Ruellia verbasciformis (syn. Eurychanes verbasciformis (Nees) Lindau) is a species of flowering plant native to the Cerrado vegetation of Brazil. It is endemic to west-central Brazil. This plant is cited in Flora Brasiliensis by Carl Friedrich Philipp von Martius.
