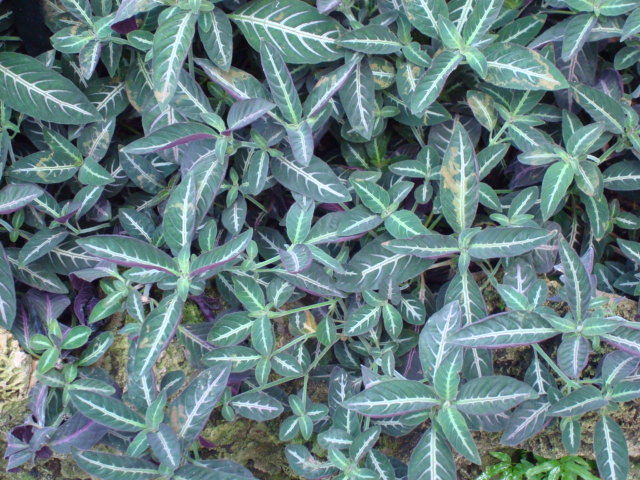

Scientific classification
- Kingdom: Plantae
- Clade: Tracheophytes
- Clade: Angiosperms
- Clade: Eudicots
- Clade: Asterids
- Order: Lamiales
- Family: Acanthaceae
- Genus: Ruellia
- Species: R. devosiana

Binomial name
- Ruellia devosiana Jacob-Makoy ex É.Morren

= Ruellia devosiana =

Species of flowering plant

Ruellia devosiana, the Brazilian wild petunia, is a green ornamental plant of the family Acanthaceae.
