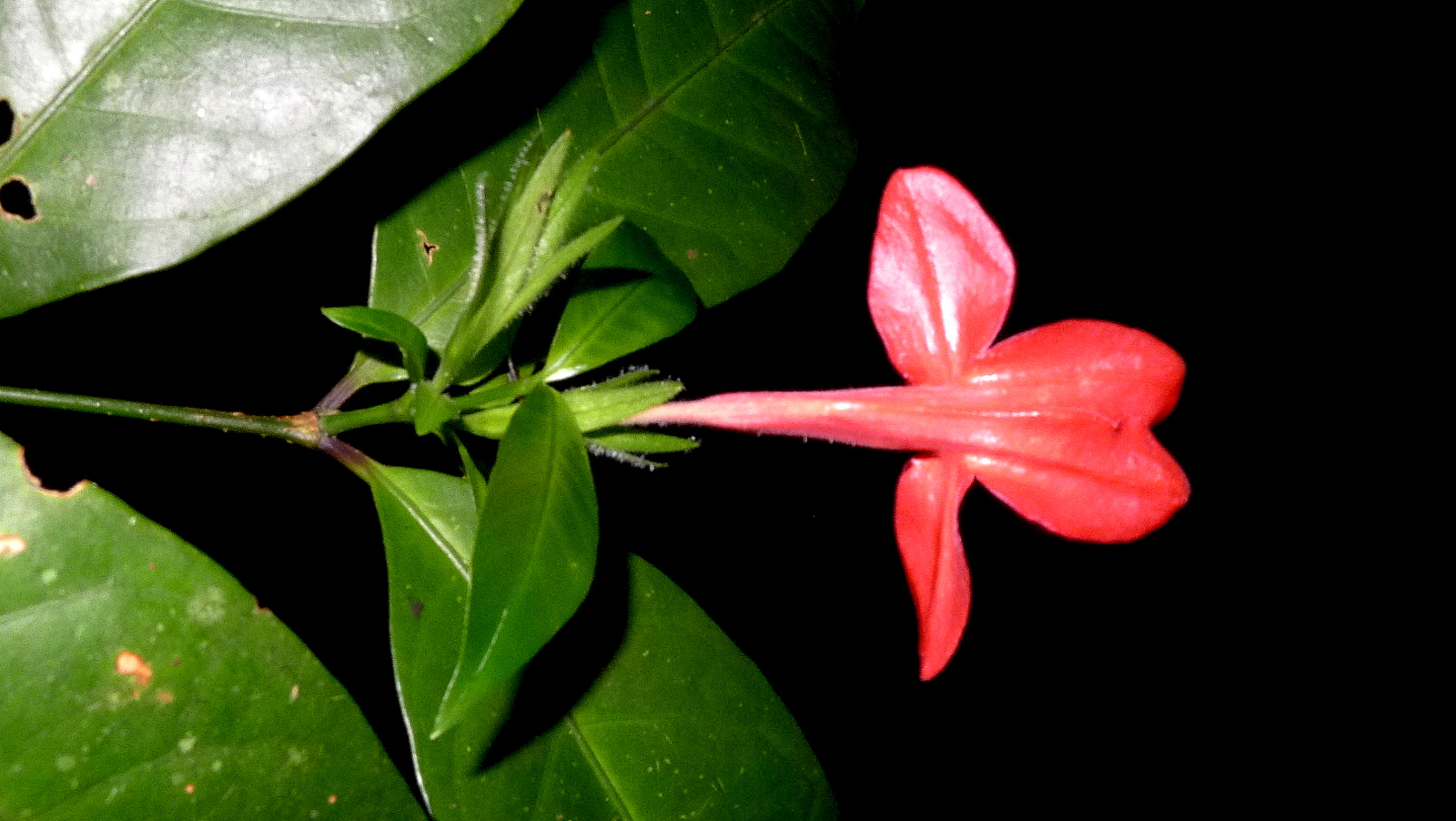

Scientific classification
- Kingdom: Plantae
- Clade: Tracheophytes
- Clade: Angiosperms
- Clade: Eudicots
- Clade: Asterids
- Order: Lamiales
- Family: Acanthaceae
- Genus: Ruellia
- Species: R. affinis

Binomial name
- Ruellia affinis (Schrad.) Lindau

= Ruellia affinis =

Species of flowering plant

Ruellia affinis, also known as red ruellia or wild petunia, is a vine native to Brazil, which is usually used as an ornamental plant.

== Description ==
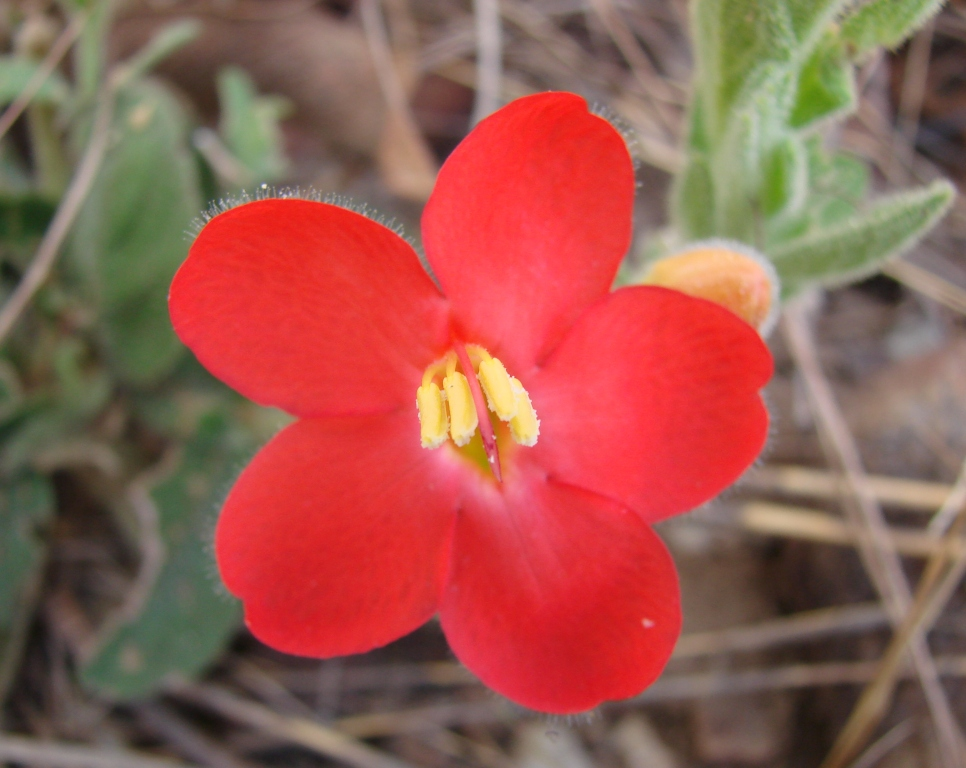
Flower

Growing to around 1–1.2 metres tall in a bright shady area, the plant is a rambling shrub that features short-petioled elliptic leaves that are 5 inches in length.

It is a winter-bloomer with showy, 2-inch wide scarlet-coloured trumpet flowers, in addition to being a vine, which is unusual for a ruellia species.

== Habitat ==
The species is endemic to Northeast and Southeast regions of Brazil in the states of Bahia and Espírito Santo. The species is found in the phytogeographic domain of the Atlantic forest, in regions with rain forest vegetation.

== Gallery ==
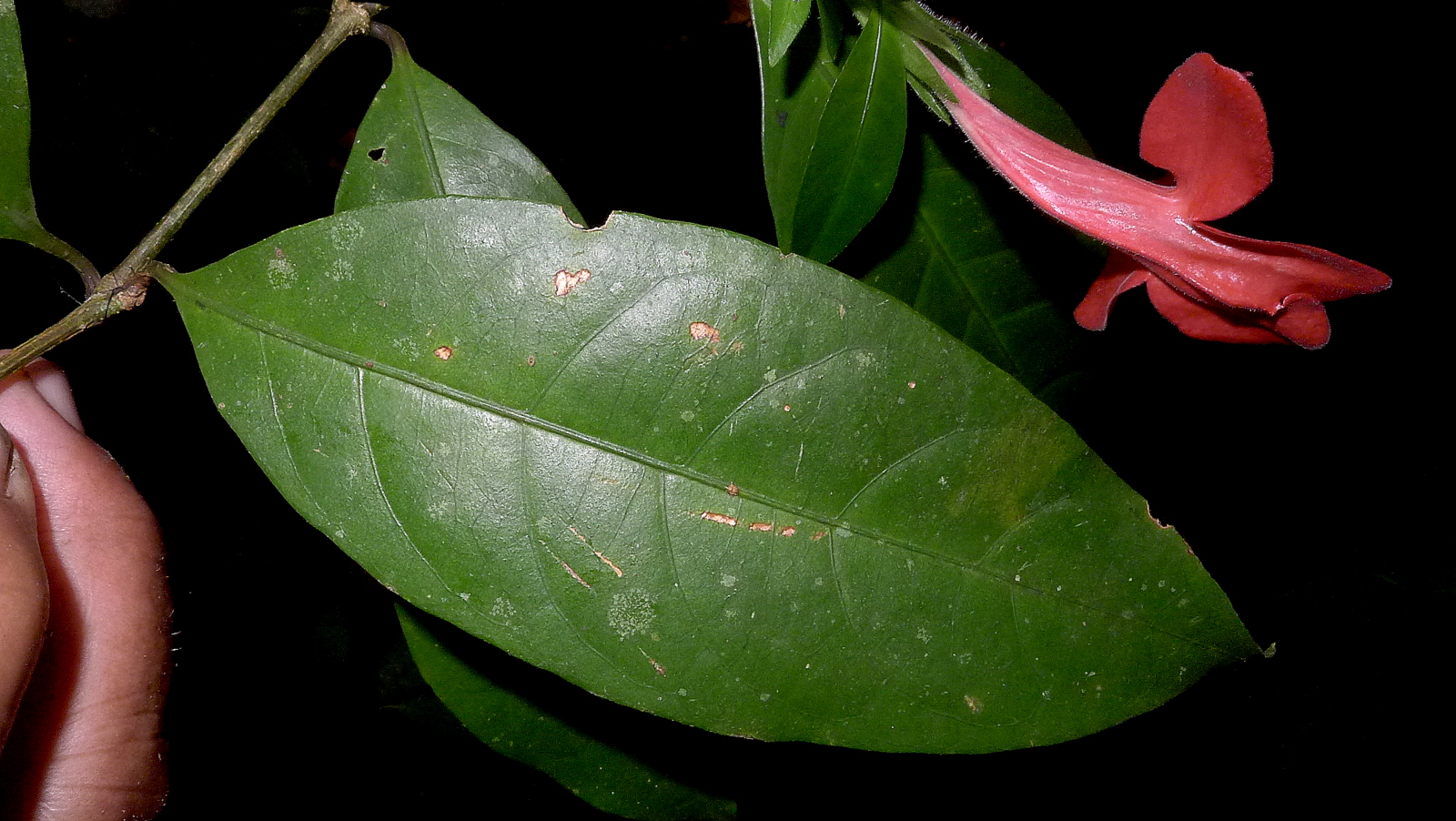
Leaf detail

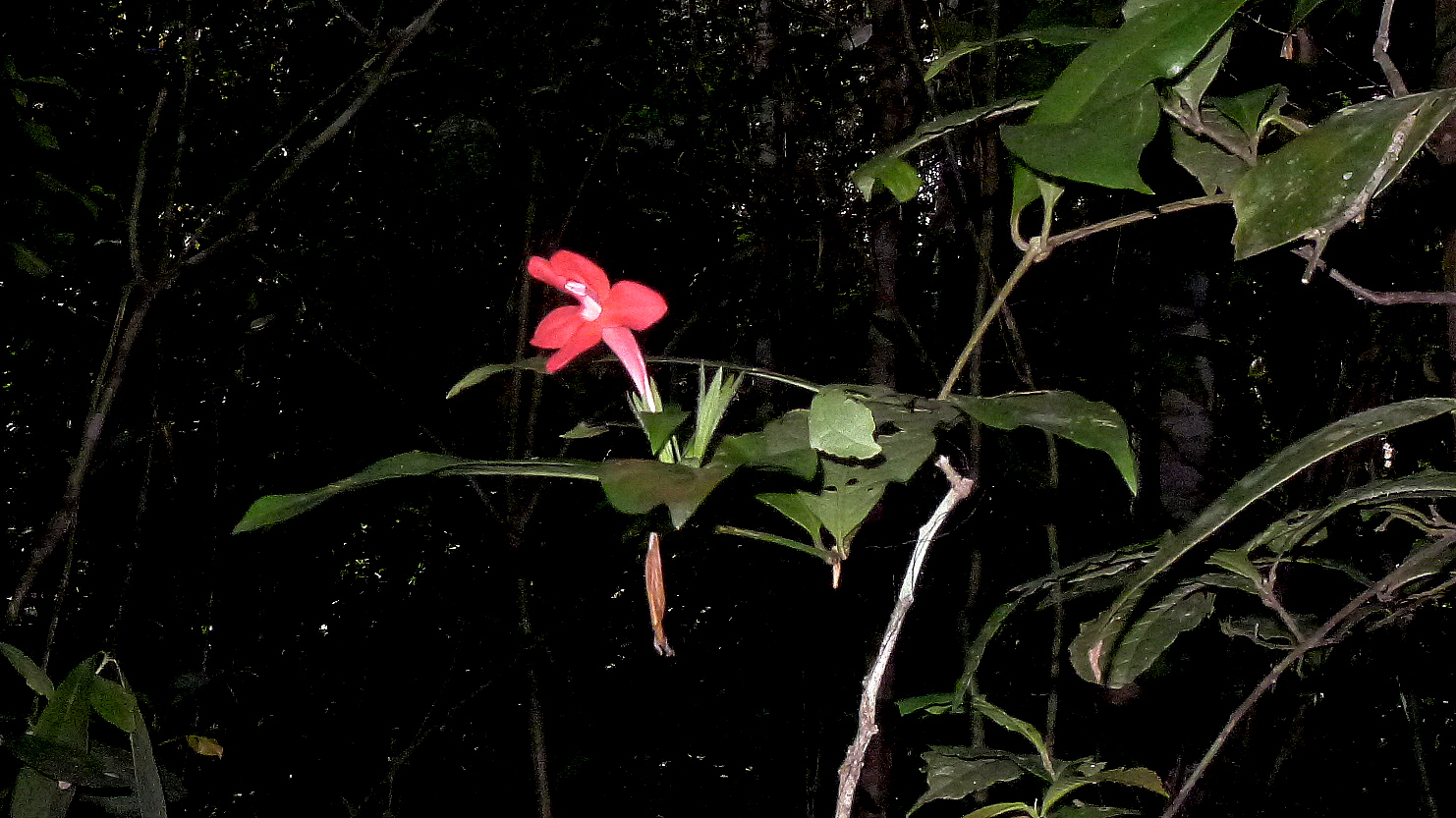
Habit

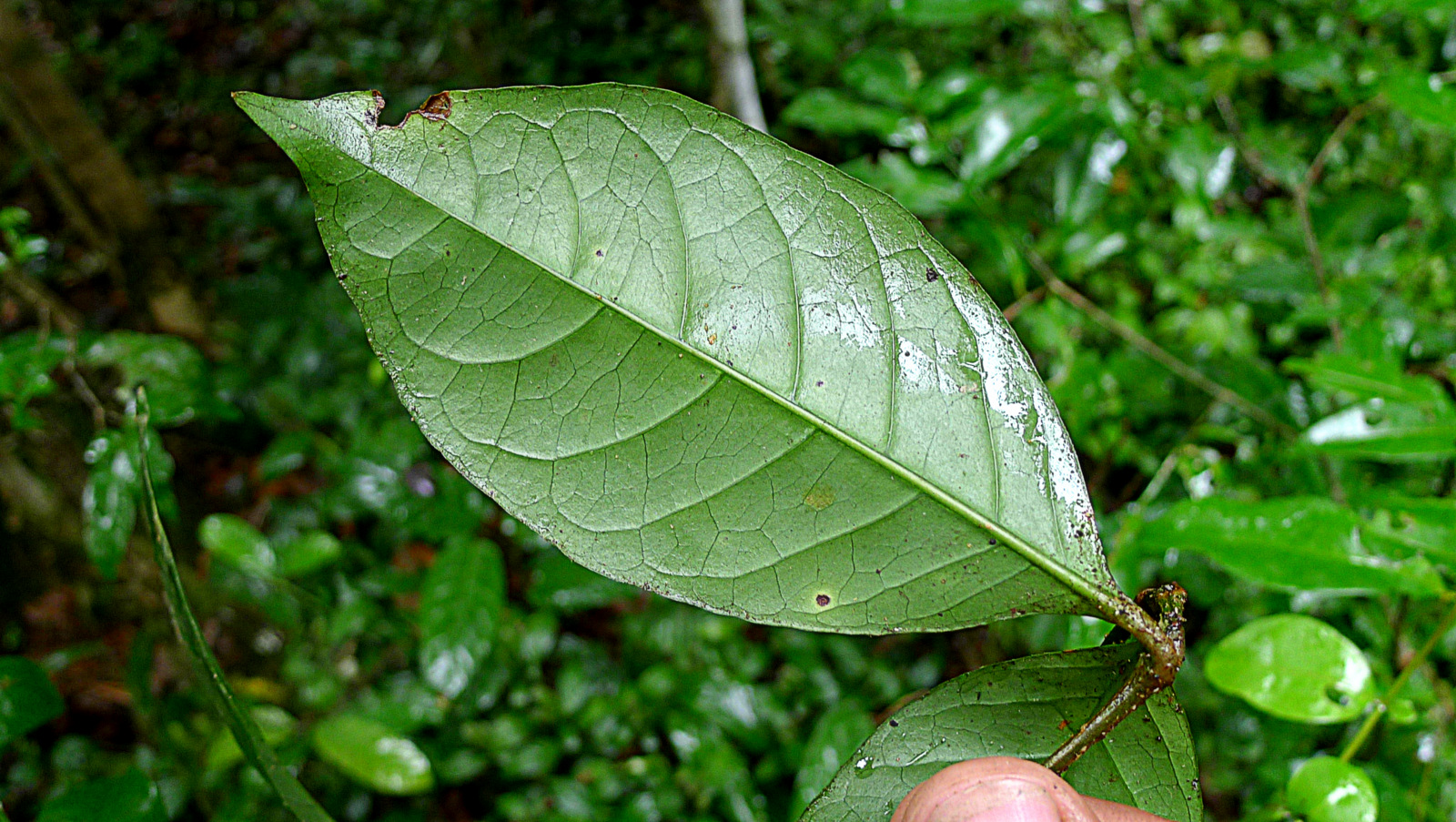
Abaxial side of leaf
