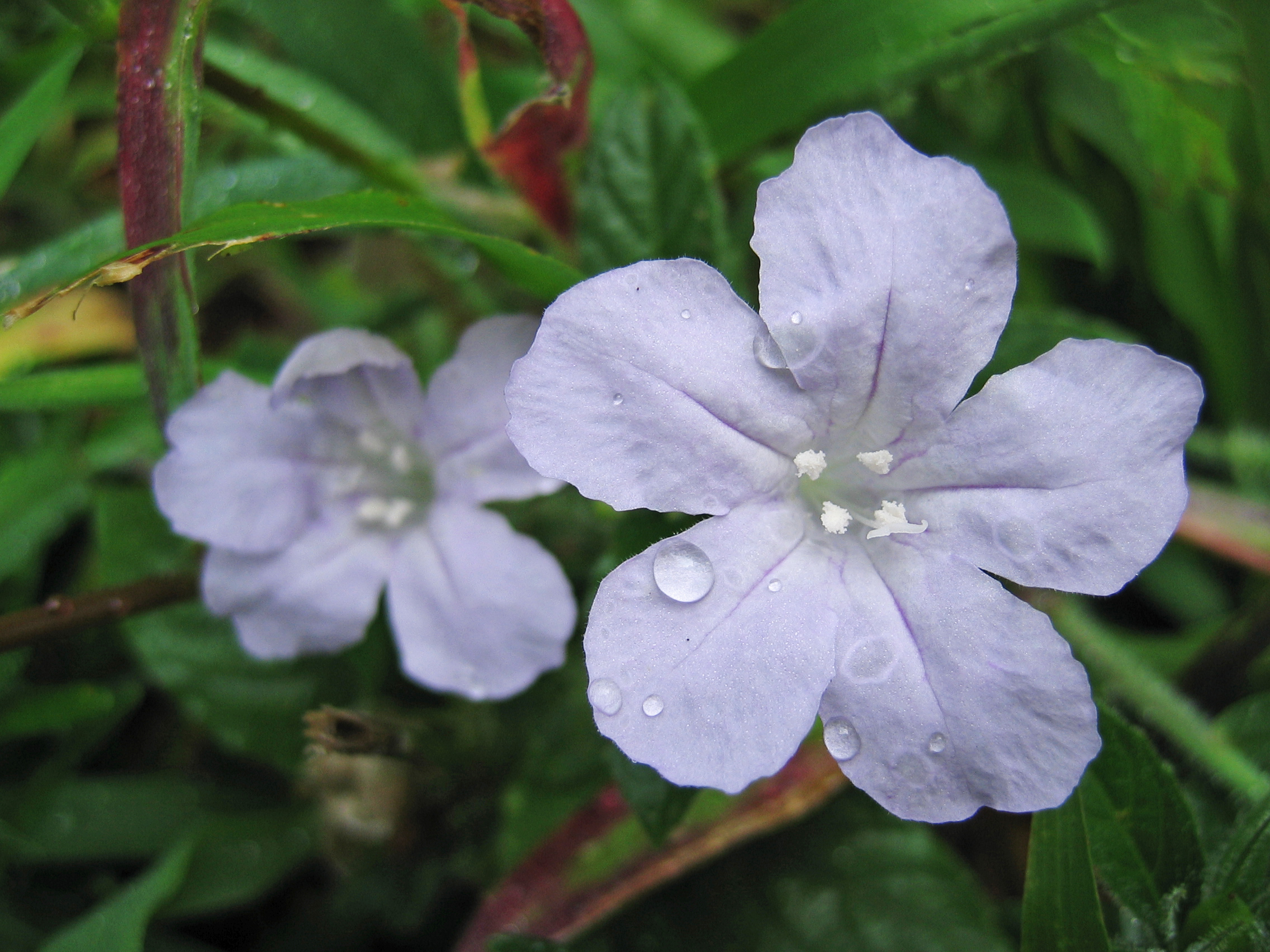

Scientific classification
- Kingdom: Plantae
- Clade: Tracheophytes
- Clade: Angiosperms
- Clade: Eudicots
- Clade: Asterids
- Order: Lamiales
- Family: Acanthaceae
- Genus: Ruellia
- Species: R. caroliniensis

Binomial name
- Ruellia caroliniensis (J.F.Gmel.) Steud.

= Ruellia caroliniensis =

Species of flowering plant

Ruellia caroliniensis, the Carolina wild petunia, is a wild petunia of the family Acanthaceae native to the southeastern United States. Its native range spans the eastern coast with the northernmost extent reaching New Jersey

== Description ==
Ruellia caroliniensis is a herbaceous perennial with purple or pinkish flowers that vary in shade. The plants grow to be up to 3 feet tall and have crowded, opposite, lanceolate to elliptic leaves. The root system is fibrous and thick. The flowers grow in axillary clusters of 2-4 and have long, funnelform corollas with five distinct lobes and grow from. The plant begins blooming in spring and continues through summer, each bloom lasting for about one day. Typically not all flowers in a cluster will be open at one time. It can be distinguished form other species in the Ruellia genus by long, pointed calyx lobes and bracts that remain as the flowers wilt.

== Etymology ==
The genus Ruellia is named after French botanist Jean Ruel, who is known for his translating of botanical publications into Latin in the early sixteenth century. Caroliniensis is a Latinized word meaning "of the Carolinas", referring to its native range or location of discovery.

The common name "petunia" is derived from the obsolete French word petun, meaning "tobacco".

Synonyms of Ruellia caroliniensis include Pattersonia caroliniensis, Ruellia caroliniensis var. caroliniensis, and Ruellia caroliniensis var. typica.

== Reproduction ==
After pollination, a seed capsule forms at the leaf axil where the flower originated. The seeds of Ruellia caroliniensis are dispersed through explosive dehiscence. When the seed capsules of the plant reach maturity (after about two months), they burst open propelling the seeds away from the parent plant.

== Ecology ==
Ruellia caroliniensis attracts a variety of pollinators, particularly lepidopterans. It is a larval host for the common buckeye butterfly (Junonia coenia) and the white peacock butterfly (Anartia jatrophae).

The strong, woody root system allows for resilience from frost or wildfire.
