= Ruellia paulayana =

Conservation status
- Vulnerable (IUCN 3.1)

Scientific classification
- Kingdom: Plantae
- Clade: Tracheophytes
- Clade: Angiosperms
- Clade: Eudicots
- Clade: Asterids
- Order: Lamiales
- Family: Acanthaceae
- Genus: Ruellia
- Species: R. paulayana

Binomial name
- Ruellia paulayana Vierh.

Species of flowering plant

Ruellia paulayana is a species of plant in the family Acanthaceae. It is endemic to the island of Socotra in Yemen.
