= Ruellia dioscoridis =

Conservation status
- Least Concern (IUCN 3.1)

Scientific classification
- Kingdom: Plantae
- Clade: Tracheophytes
- Clade: Angiosperms
- Clade: Eudicots
- Clade: Asterids
- Order: Lamiales
- Family: Acanthaceae
- Genus: Ruellia
- Species: R. dioscoridis

Binomial name
- Ruellia dioscoridis Napper

Species of flowering plant

Ruellia dioscoridis is a species of plant in the family Acanthaceae. It is endemic to Yemen. Its natural habitats are subtropical or tropical dry shrubland and subtropical or tropical dry lowland grassland.
