= Ruellia rasa =

Scientific classification
- Kingdom: Plantae
- Clade: Tracheophytes
- Clade: Angiosperms
- Clade: Eudicots
- Clade: Asterids
- Order: Lamiales
- Family: Acanthaceae
- Genus: Ruellia
- Species: R. rasa

Binomial name
- Ruellia rasa Hiern (1877)

Species of flowering plant

Ruellia rasa is a flowering plant in the family Acanthaceae. It is native to the Cerrado vegetation of southeastern Brazil.
