= Ruellia hapalotricha =

Scientific classification
- Kingdom: Plantae
- Clade: Tracheophytes
- Clade: Angiosperms
- Clade: Eudicots
- Clade: Asterids
- Order: Lamiales
- Family: Acanthaceae
- Genus: Ruellia
- Species: R. hapalotricha

Binomial name
- Ruellia hapalotricha Lindau (1898)

Species of flowering plant

Ruellia hapalotricha is a species of flowering plant native to the Cerrado vegetation of Brazil.
