= Ruellia angustior =

Scientific classification
- Kingdom: Plantae
- Clade: Tracheophytes
- Clade: Angiosperms
- Clade: Eudicots
- Clade: Asterids
- Order: Lamiales
- Family: Acanthaceae
- Genus: Ruellia
- Species: R. angustior

Binomial name
- Ruellia angustior (Nees) Lindau (1898)

Synonyms
- Stemonacanthus angustior Nees (1847); Stemonacanthus angustior var. microphyllus Nees (1847)

Species of flowering plant

Ruellia angustior is a plant native of Cerrado vegetation of western Brazil. This plant is cited in Flora Brasiliensis by Carl Friedrich Philipp von Martius.
