= Lepidagathis alopecuroidea =

Pata de gallons

Scientific classification
- Kingdom: Plantae
- Clade: Tracheophytes
- Clade: Angiosperms
- Clade: Eudicots
- Clade: Asterids
- Order: Lamiales
- Family: Acanthaceae
- Genus: Lepidagathis
- Species: L. alopecuroidea

Binomial name
- Lepidagathis alopecuroidea (Vahl) R.Br. ex Griseb.

Synonyms
- Adenosma chenopodiifolia (Poir.) Spreng.; Aetheilema alopecuroidea (Vahl) Spreng.; Aetheilema haenkei Nees; Justicia procumbens Thiéb.-Bern. ex Nees; Lepidagathis hyssopifolia (Benth.) T.Anderson; Lepidagathis laguroidea (Nees) T.Anderson; Lepidagathis lanceolata (Nees) Wassh.; Lepidagathis laurentii De Wild.; Ruellia alopecuroidea Vahl; Ruellia chenopodiifolia Poir.; Ruellia lagopodes Ryan ex Nees; Teliostachya alopecuroidea (Vahl) Nees; Teliostachya hyssopifolia Benth.; Teliostachya laguroidea Nees; Teliostachya lanceolata Nees; Teliostachya petraea Leonard

Species of plant

Lepidagathis alopecuroidea, synonym Teliostachya alopecuroidea, the pata de gallina, is a plant with a wide distribution in the Americas (from southern Mexico to northern Paraguay) and Africa (from west tropical Africa to east Tanzania and Angola).

== See also ==
- List of plants of Cerrado vegetation of Brazil
