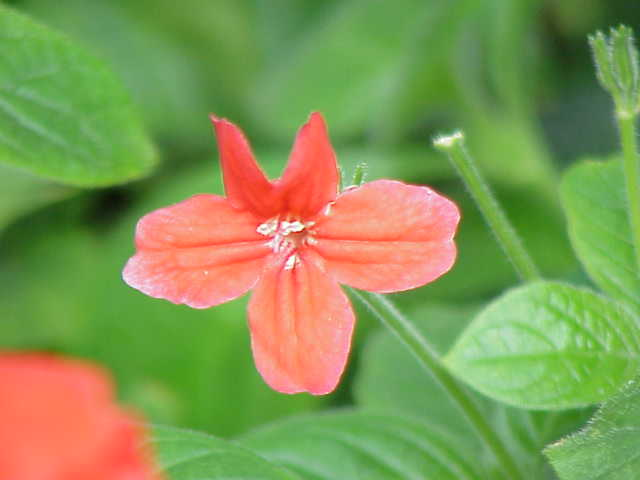

Scientific classification
- Kingdom: Plantae
- Clade: Tracheophytes
- Clade: Angiosperms
- Clade: Eudicots
- Clade: Asterids
- Order: Lamiales
- Family: Acanthaceae
- Genus: Ruellia
- Species: R. elegans

Binomial name
- Ruellia elegans Poir. (1816)

Synonyms
- Arrhostoxylum elegans (Poir.) Bremek. & Nann.-Bremek. (1948); Arrhostoxylum formosum Nees (1847); Arrhostoxylum roseum Nees (1847); Arrhostoxylum silvaccola var. montanum Nees (1847); Asystasia formosa T.Anderson (1868); Ruellia formosa Andrews (1810), nom. illeg.; Ruellia rosea (Nees) W.Bull (1878); Ruellia speciosa Mart. ex Nees (1847), not validly publ.; Ruellia superba D.Dietr. (1821); Stemonacanthus formosus T.Anderson (1868)

= Ruellia elegans =

Species of flowering plant

Ruellia elegans is a species of flowering plant in the family Acanthaceae. It is a subshrub native to eastern and southern Brazil, where it grows in the Cerrado ecoregion.

It is used as an ornamental plant, and it is pollinated by hummingbirds. Large scarlet-red blooms on & off from spring until first frost. Can take full sun with adequate moisture like in a tropical location but best in shade.

The plant forms a 12 inch by 24 inch in diameter mound of soft green foliage. It is usually described as an annual but because it reseeds it is thought of as a perennial.
