= Jean Ruel =

French physician and botanist

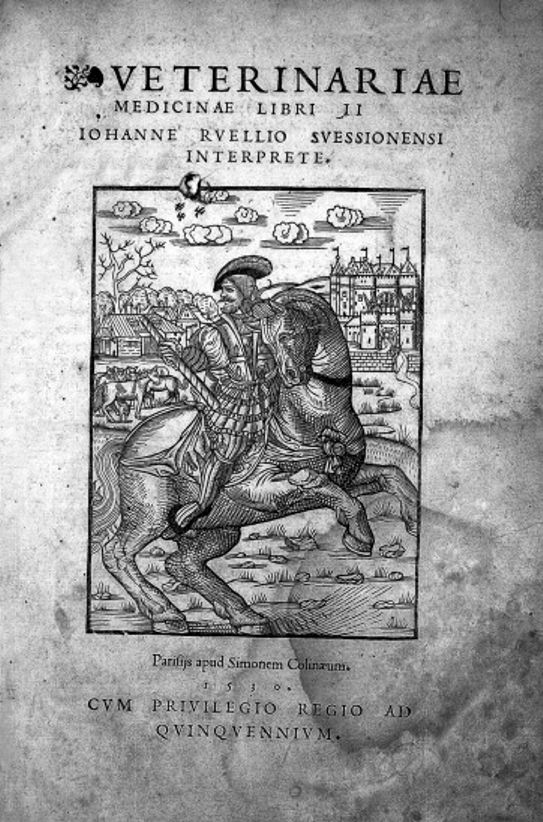
Title page woodcut of Veterinariae medicinae

Jean Ruel (1474 – 24 September 1537), also known as Jean Ruelle or Ioannes Ruellius in its Latinised form, was a French physician and botanist noted for the 1536 publication in Paris of De Natura Stirpium, a Renaissance treatise on botany.

Ruel was born in Soissons. He was self-taught in Greek and Latin, and studied medicine, graduating in 1508, or, according to other sources in 1502. In 1509 he became physician to Francis I, devoted himself at the same time to a study of botany and pharmacology. He was a professor at the University of Paris, and a large part of his academic career was given to an analysis of Dioscorides' De materia medica, of which he published a Latin translation in 1516. Ruel's three-volume De Natura Stirpium, which was published without illustrations, was intended partly as a gloss to the ancient writers. In it he described in great detail not only the habit and habitat, but also the smell and taste of each plant, producing a list in French of a large number of plant names.

Although some of his works were compilations or translations of previous authors, they represent the first attempt to popularise botany. His 1530 book Hippiatrika or Veterinariae medicinae, commissioned by Francis I, is a Latin collation of all that was written in Greek of Veterinary Medicine. Ruel also produced anatomical fugitive sheets of a man and woman in 1539. These sheets were constructed of hinged layers which could be lifted so that internal human anatomy was revealed. Ruell translated a large number of works into Latin, such as the last two volumes of Joannes Actuarius' De Methodo Medendi, which he published under the title De Medicamentorum Compositione in 1539.

After the death of Ruel's wife, Étienne de Poncher the Bishop of Paris, appointed Ruel as canon at Notre Dame de Paris on 12 December 1526, enabling him to pursue his studies. Ruel died in Paris and was buried in Notre-Dame. Charles Plumier, the noted Marseilles botanist named the genus Ruellia in his honour.

In 1753, botanist Carl Linnaeus published in his book Species Plantarum Ruellia, a genus of flowering plants commonly known as ruellias or wild petunias, in the Acanthaceae family and the name honours Jean Ruel. Then in 1889, botanist C.B.Clarke published Ruelliopsis, a genus of flowering plants from South Africa belonging to the family Acanthaceae and whose name also honours Jean Ruel.

== Works ==
- Roßartzney : zwey nützliche, sehr gute Bücher von mancherley Gebrechen der Roß unnd anderer arbeitsamen Thieren. Ruel, Jean [Hrsg.]. Gerlach, Nürmberg 1575 Digital edition by the University and State Library Düsseldorf.
