= List of plants known as violet =

Violet identifies various plant taxa, particularly species in the genus Viola, within which the common violet is the best known member in Eurasia and the common blue violet and common purple violet are the best known members in North America, but also:

- Various species of Barleria, including:
  - Barleria cristata, Philippine violet
  - Barleria obtusa, bush violet
  - Barleria repens, small bush violet
- Browallia, bush violets
- Erythronium, dog's tooth violets
- Exacum affine, Persian violet
- Hesperis matronalis, damask violet, dame's violet
- Hottonia palustris, water violet
- Streptocarpus sect. Saintpaulia, African violets
- Telosma cordata, Chinese violet

== See also ==
- Securidaca longipedunculata, violet tree
