= Calesia haemorrhoa =

Scientific classification
- Kingdom: Animalia
- Phylum: Arthropoda
- Clade: Pancrustacea
- Class: Insecta
- Order: Lepidoptera
- Superfamily: Noctuoidea
- Family: Erebidae
- Genus: Calesia
- Species: C. haemorrhoa

Binomial name
- Calesia haemorrhoa Guenée, 1852

Species of moth

Calesia haemorrhoa, the gray-winged gibbon moth, is a moth of the family Noctuidae. It was first described by Achille Guenée in 1852. It is found in India and Sri Lanka. The forewings are a uniform grayish color. The head, femora, tibiae and abdomen are fringed with pinkish-orange hairs. Caterpillars are known to feed on Justicia wynaadensis, Justicia vasica, Barleria cristata and Eranthemum nervosum.
