= Bush violet =

Bush violet or bush-violet is a common name for several plants and may refer to:

- Barleria obtusa, a species in the family Acanthaceae native to South Africa
- Browallia, a genus in the family Solanaceae native to the Americas
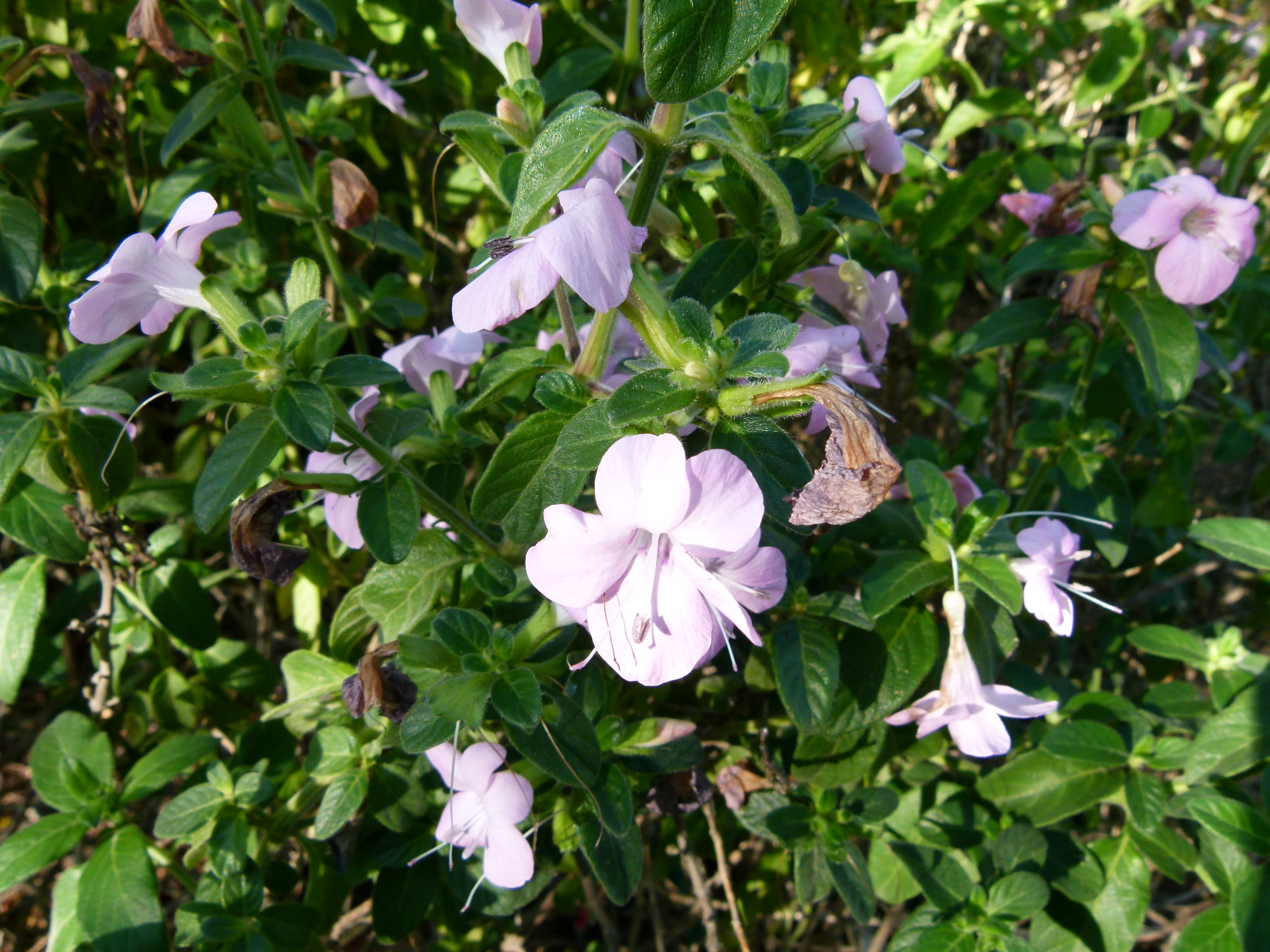
Barleria obtusa

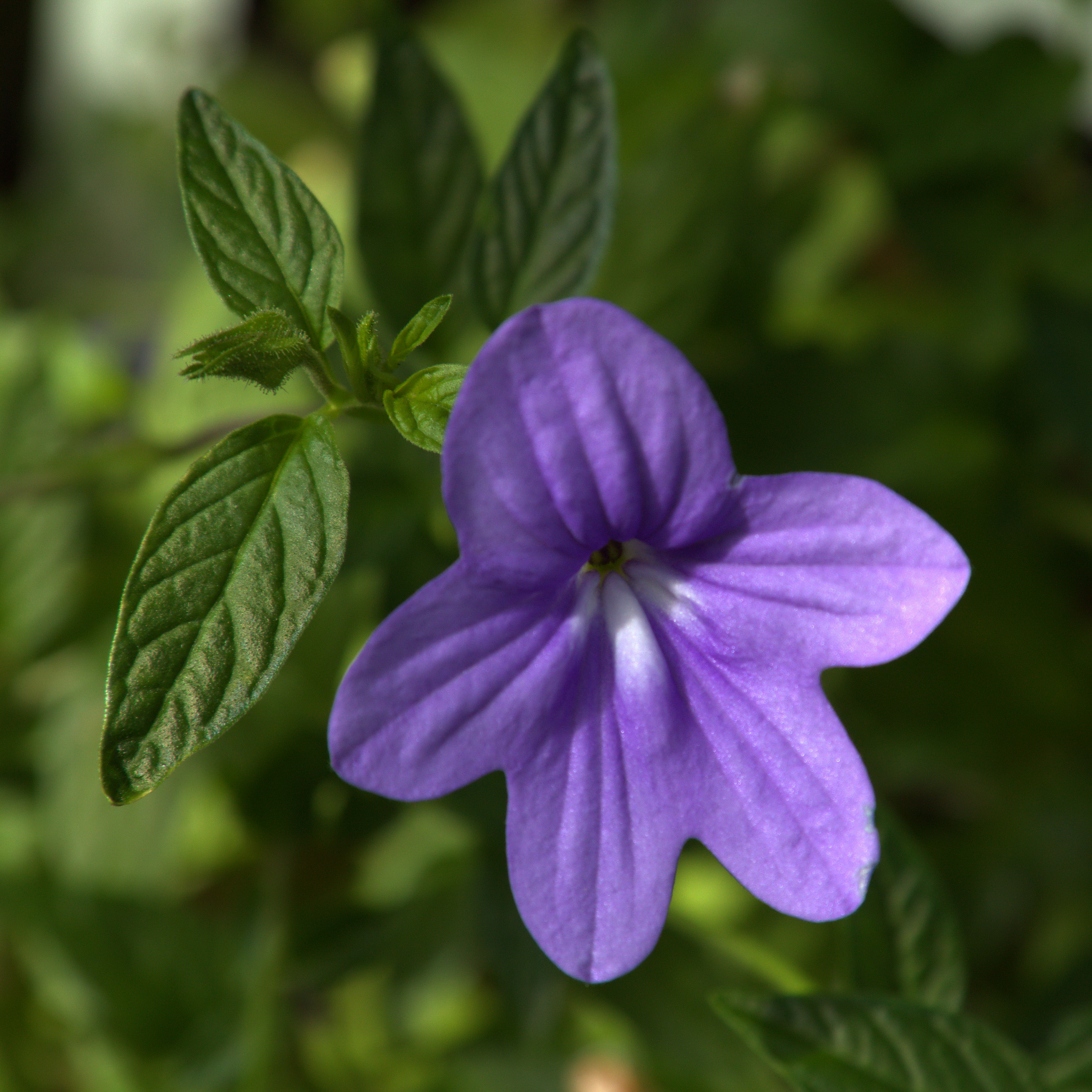
Browallia speciosa
