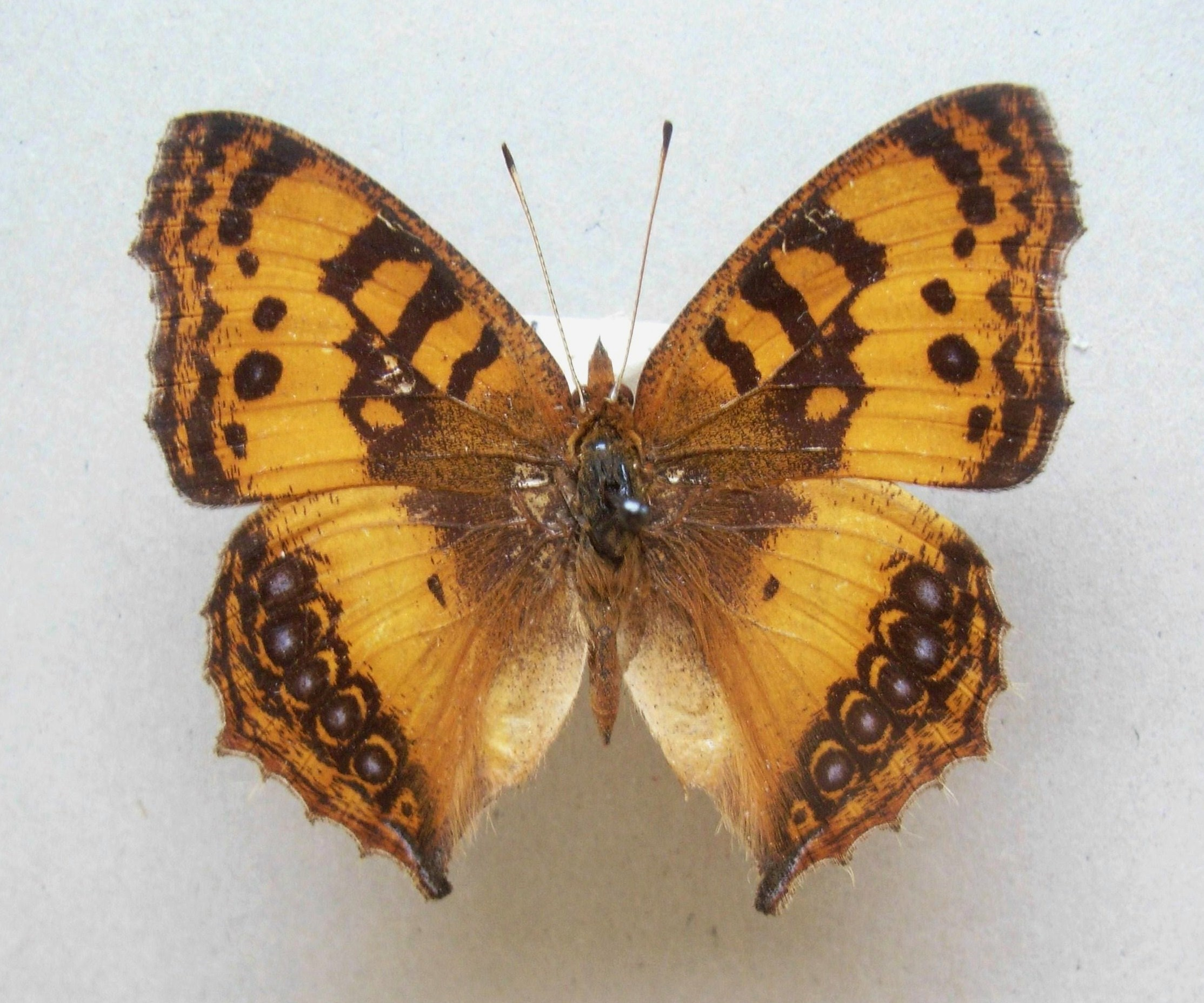
- C. cloanthe subsp. ligata
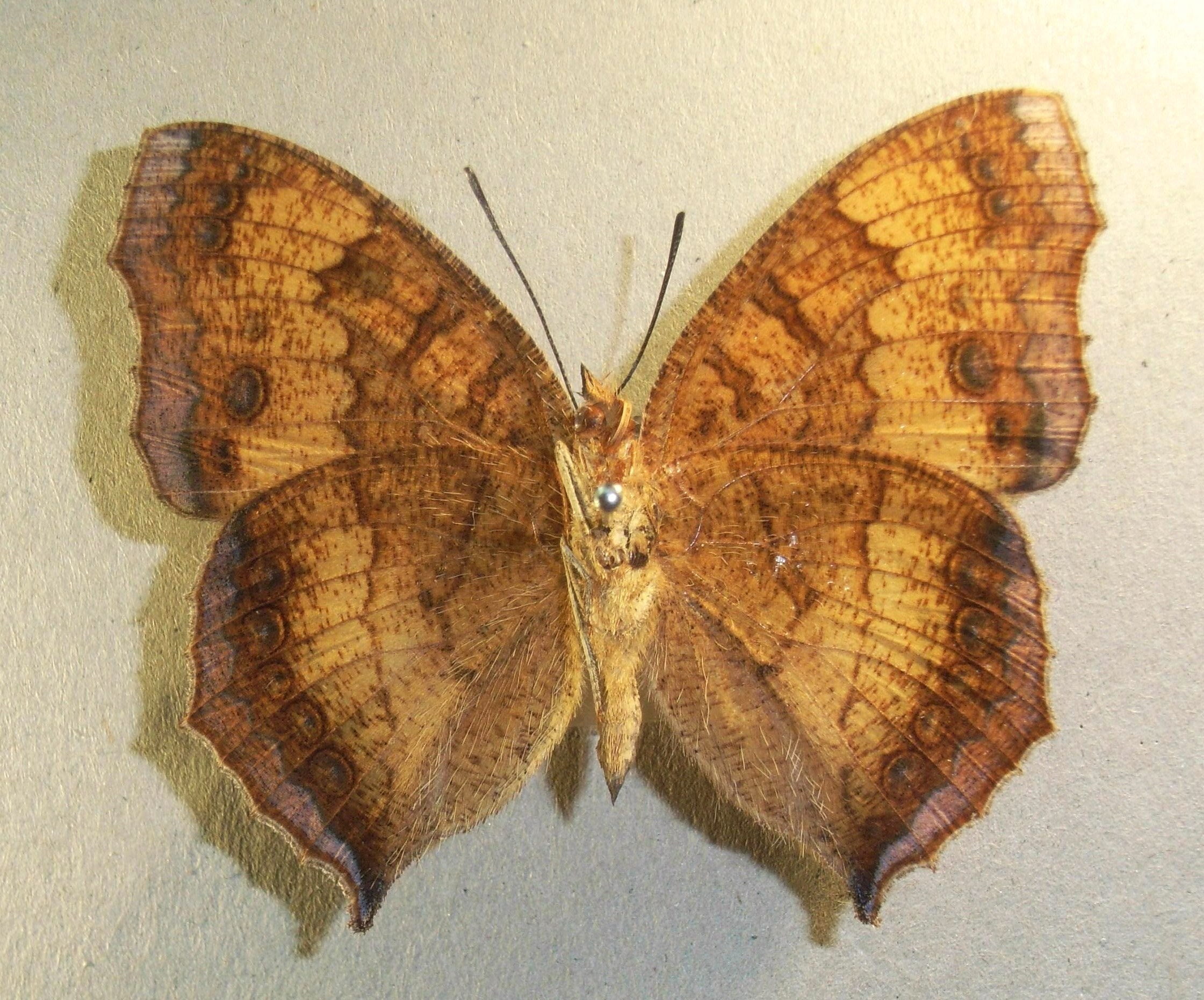
- C. cloanthe subsp. cloanthe

Scientific classification
- Kingdom: Animalia
- Phylum: Arthropoda
- Clade: Pancrustacea
- Class: Insecta
- Order: Lepidoptera
- Family: Nymphalidae
- Tribe: Kallimini
- Genus: Catacroptera; Karsch, 1894
- Species: C. cloanthe

Binomial name
- Catacroptera cloanthe (Stoll, 1781)

Synonyms
- Papilio cloanthe Stoll, 1781; Precis cloantha var. obscurior Staudinger, 1885; Catcroptera cloanthe intermedia Rothschild, 1918

= Catacroptera =

Pirate

Genus of butterflies

Catacroptera is a monotypic butterfly genus of the subfamily Nymphalinae in the family Nymphalidae found in sub-Saharan Africa. The habitat consists of grassland and savanna. Adults are on wing year round, but from September to April in cooler areas.

== Food plants ==
The larvae feed on Justicia protracta, Barleria stuhlmanni, Ruellia cordata, Asystasia gangetica, Barleria opaca, Ruellia togoensis, Chaetacanthus setiger, Asclepias and Phaulopsis species.

== Subspecies ==
- C. c. subsp. cloanthe – East and southern Africa: Kenya, Tanzania, Zambia, Zimbabwe, Botswana, Eswatini, South Africa (Limpopo, Mpumalanga, North West, Gauteng, KwaZulu-Natal, Eastern Cape, Western Cape)
- C. c. subsp. ligata Rothschild & Jordan, 1903 – West Africa: south-eastern Senegal, Gambia, Guinea, Burkina Faso, Sierra Leone, Liberia, Ivory Coast, Ghana, Togo, Benin, Nigeria, Cameroon

Torben Larsen developed a species numbering system for his 2005 publication Butterflies of West Africa. The subspecies ligata is #824. The 'Larsen' numbers have since been used with permission in A Sharp Eye on Butterflies of Ghana.
