= Calesia fuscicorpus =

Scientific classification
- Kingdom: Animalia
- Phylum: Arthropoda
- Clade: Pancrustacea
- Class: Insecta
- Order: Lepidoptera
- Superfamily: Noctuoidea
- Family: Erebidae
- Genus: Calesia
- Species: C. fuscicorpus

Binomial name
- Calesia fuscicorpus Hampson, 1891

Species of moth

Calesia fuscicorpus is a moth of the family Noctuidae first described by George Hampson in 1891. It is found in India and Sri Lanka. Caterpillars are known to feed on Justicia wynaadensis. The male has a significant area of dense, raised scales that obscure the white discal spot and other markings.
