= B. obtusa =

B. obtusa may refer to:

- Banksia obtusa, the shining honeypot, a shrub species
- Barleria obtusa, the bush violet, a plant species
- Botryosphaeria obtusa, a plant pathogen species
