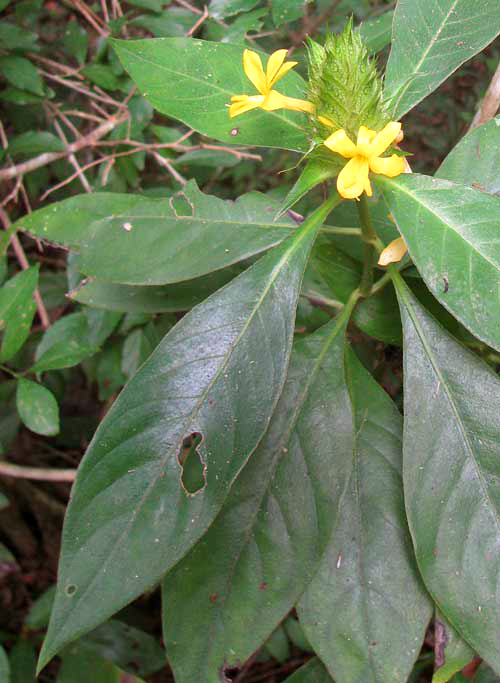
- Barleria oenotheroides flowering

Scientific classification
- Kingdom: Plantae
- Clade: Tracheophytes
- Clade: Angiosperms
- Clade: Eudicots
- Clade: Asterids
- Order: Lamiales
- Family: Acanthaceae
- Genus: Barleria
- Species: B. oenotheroides

Binomial name
- Barleria oenotheroides Dum.Cours.

Synonyms
- List: Barleria afzelii Lindau; Barleria discolor Nees; Barleria flava J.Jacq.; Barleria gentianoides Desf. ex Nees; Barleria micans Nees in G.Bentham; Barleria senegalensis Nees; Barleriopsis discolor (Nees) Oerst.; Barleriopsis glandulosa Oerst.; Barleriopsis glandulosa var. brevifolia Oerst.; Barleriopsis micans (Nees) Oerst.; Barleriopsis micans var. brachystachya Oerst.; Eranthemum cristatum Humb. & Bonpl. ex Spreng.; Eranthemum flavum Willd.; Justicia lutea Sessé & Moc.; Justicia oxyphylla DC. ex Nees; Justicia serrata Humb. ex Nees

= Barleria oenotheroides =

Species of flowering plant

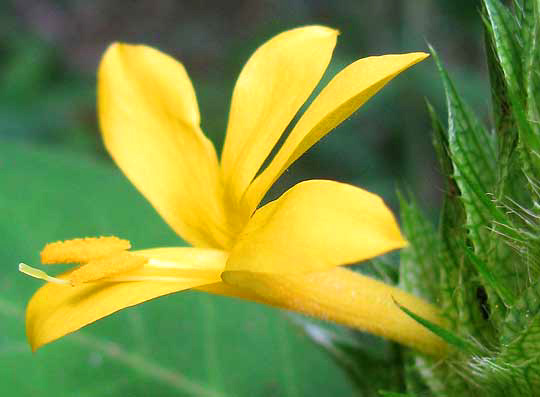
Barleria oenotheroides flower

Barleria oenotheroides, sometimes called giant yellow shrimp or simply yellow barleria, is a species of subshrub native both to the Americas and Africa. It belongs to the mostly tropical family Acanthaceae.

== Description ==
Barleria oenotheroides displays these noteworthy features:

- Stems are erect, herbaceous, and growing to about 80 cm (31 in) tall, with hair-like trichomes up to 1 mm (1/16 in) long lying close to the stem, and dense, prominent, tiny cystoliths.
- Leaves are up to 23 cm (9.1 in) long and 5.2 cm (2 in), wide. On petioles up to 1.5 cm (1/2 in) long, blades gradually diminish to a point at both ends. Blade margins develop no teeth or indentations and their surfaces bear trichomes and cystoliths.
- Inflorescences are dense, terminal spikes up to 7 cm (2 3/4 in) long, with a few flowers at a time emerging from behind conspicuous sharp-pointed bracts up to 35 mm (1 1/2 in) long and 15 mm (1/2 in) wide. The bracts' outside surfaces are velvety-hairy with some gland-tipped trichomes mixed in. Bract margins bear spiny trichomes up to 2 mm (1/8 in) long.
- Flowers up to 45 mm (2 in) long have yellow corollas which are bilaterally symmetrical, consisting of a slender tube up to about 30 mm (1 1/8 in) long, topped with 5 lobes spreading atop the tube in a 4+1 configuration; the lobes are about as long as the tube. Two stamens about 40 mm (1 1/2 in) project beyond the tube bearing conspicuous anthers.
- Fruits are elliptic, up to 20 mm (3/4 in) long, with the tips gradually diminishing to a point.

== Distribution ==
With populations in both the American and African tropics, Barleria oenotheroides displays a strikingly disjunct distribution. In the Americas the species is native to Mexico south through Central America into Colombia and Venezuela in northern South America. In Africa it occurs in the western equatorial countries of Senegal, Guinea-Bissau, Guinea, Sierra Leone, Ivory Coast, Ghana, Nigeria and Central African Republic.

== Habitat ==
In southeastern Mexico's Yucatan Peninsula, Barleria oenotheroides occurs in seasonal tropical forest. In Africa the species grows in a variety of dry to wet forests and frequently is found along watercourses.

== Taxonomy ==
Barleria oenotheroides was first formally named and described in 1811 by the French botanist and agronomist Georges Louis Marie Dumont de Courset, who described it in his greenhouse as making a very agreeable effect, without saying where his seeds had come from.

=== Phylogeny ===
Since the 300 or so currently accepted species of Barleria are overwhelmingly Old World, and Barleria oenotheroides is the only Barleria native to both the Old World and tropical America, its phylogeny might be expected to be unusual. In fact, phylogenetic analysis suggests that Barleria oenotheroides is sister to all other species of Barleria in the subgenus Barleria.

Furthermore, studies confirm that the ancestors of Barleria oenotheroides were African. It is suggested that the species already was established in the Americas before European colonization began, and that before their arrival animals, wind or ocean currents may have carried a seed or seeds from Africa to the New World. Probably this dispersal occurred during the Pliocene or Upper Miocene (~11.6-5.3 epochs (~11.6-2.6 million years ago).

=== Etymology ===
The genus name Barleria honors the French Dominican monk and biologist Jacques Barrelier (1603–1673).

The species name oenotheroides means "resembling the genus Oenothera", Oenothera being commonly called the evening primrose, and having leaves resembling those of Barleria oenotheroides.
