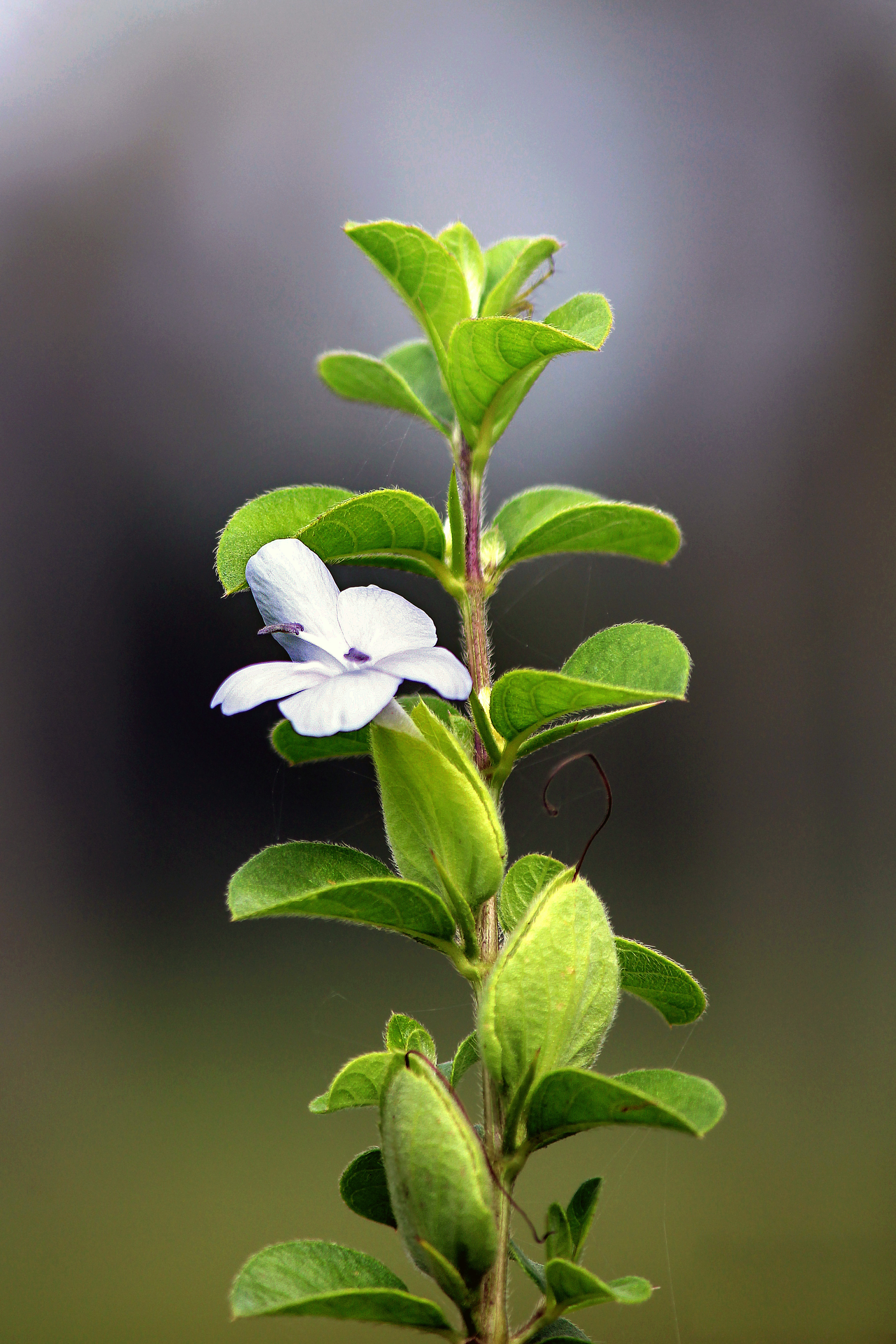

Scientific classification
- Kingdom: Plantae
- Clade: Tracheophytes
- Clade: Angiosperms
- Clade: Eudicots
- Clade: Asterids
- Order: Lamiales
- Family: Acanthaceae
- Genus: Barleria
- Species: B. mysorensis

Binomial name
- Barleria mysorensis B.Heyne ex Roth

Synonyms
- Barleria buxifolia Roxb. [Invalid]; Barleria obovata Buch.-Ham.; Barleria spinaceylanica Nees (unresolved); Dicranacanthus spinaceylanica (Nees) Oerst.

= Barleria mysorensis =

Species of flowering plant

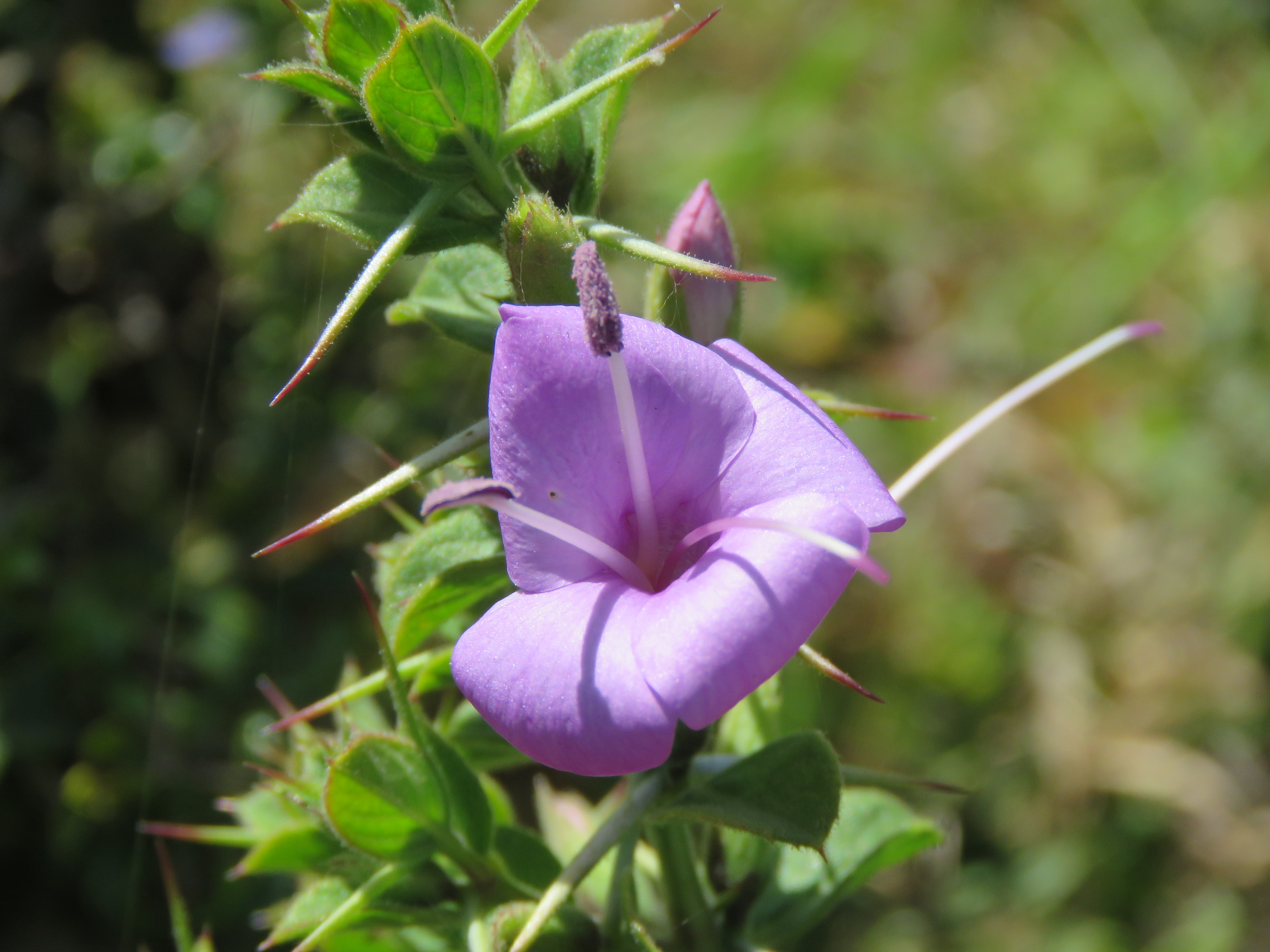
At Mudumalai National Park, Tamil Nadu

Barleria mysorensis, a plant species within the genus Barleria of the family Acanthaceae. It is native to southern India and Sri Lanka. It is widely used as an ayurvedic plant in India and Sri Lanka. In Sri Lanka, it is known as "Katu Nelu".
