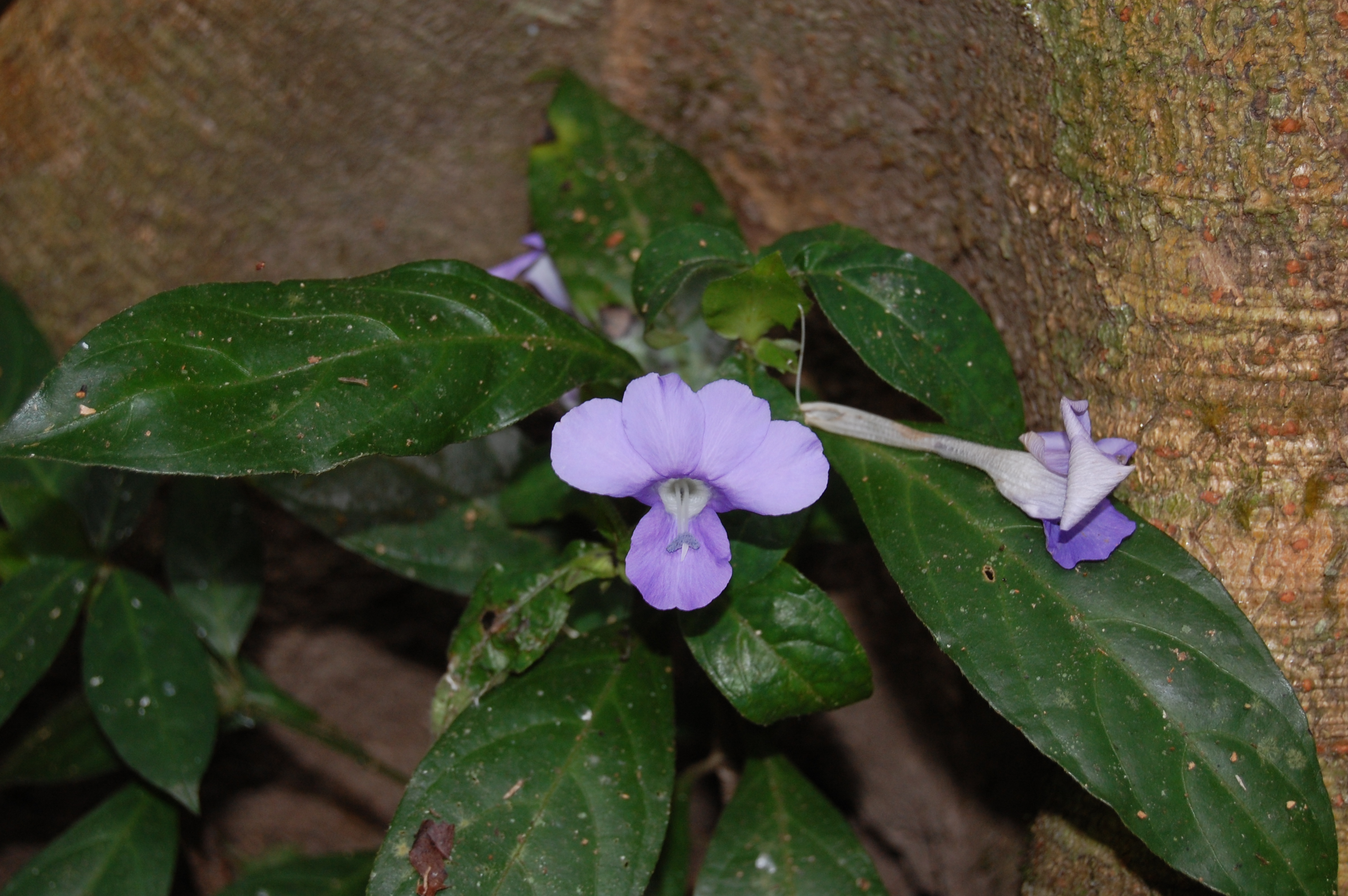

Scientific classification
- Kingdom: Plantae
- Clade: Tracheophytes
- Clade: Angiosperms
- Clade: Eudicots
- Clade: Asterids
- Order: Lamiales
- Family: Acanthaceae
- Genus: Barleria
- Species: B. strigosa

Binomial name
- Barleria strigosa Willd.

= Barleria strigosa =

Species of flowering plant

Barleria strigosa is a plant in the family Acanthaceae. It occurs naturally in the foothills of the Himalayas, but has been introduced to far northern Queensland, Australia.

In Thailand, it is known as Sangkorani (สังกรณี) or Sangkorani trijawa (สังกรณีตรีชวา), after the name of the legendary flower (Sanjeevani) in the Ramakien literature, a Thai version of Ramayana epic. Because it can be used as a medicinal herb just like in mythology.

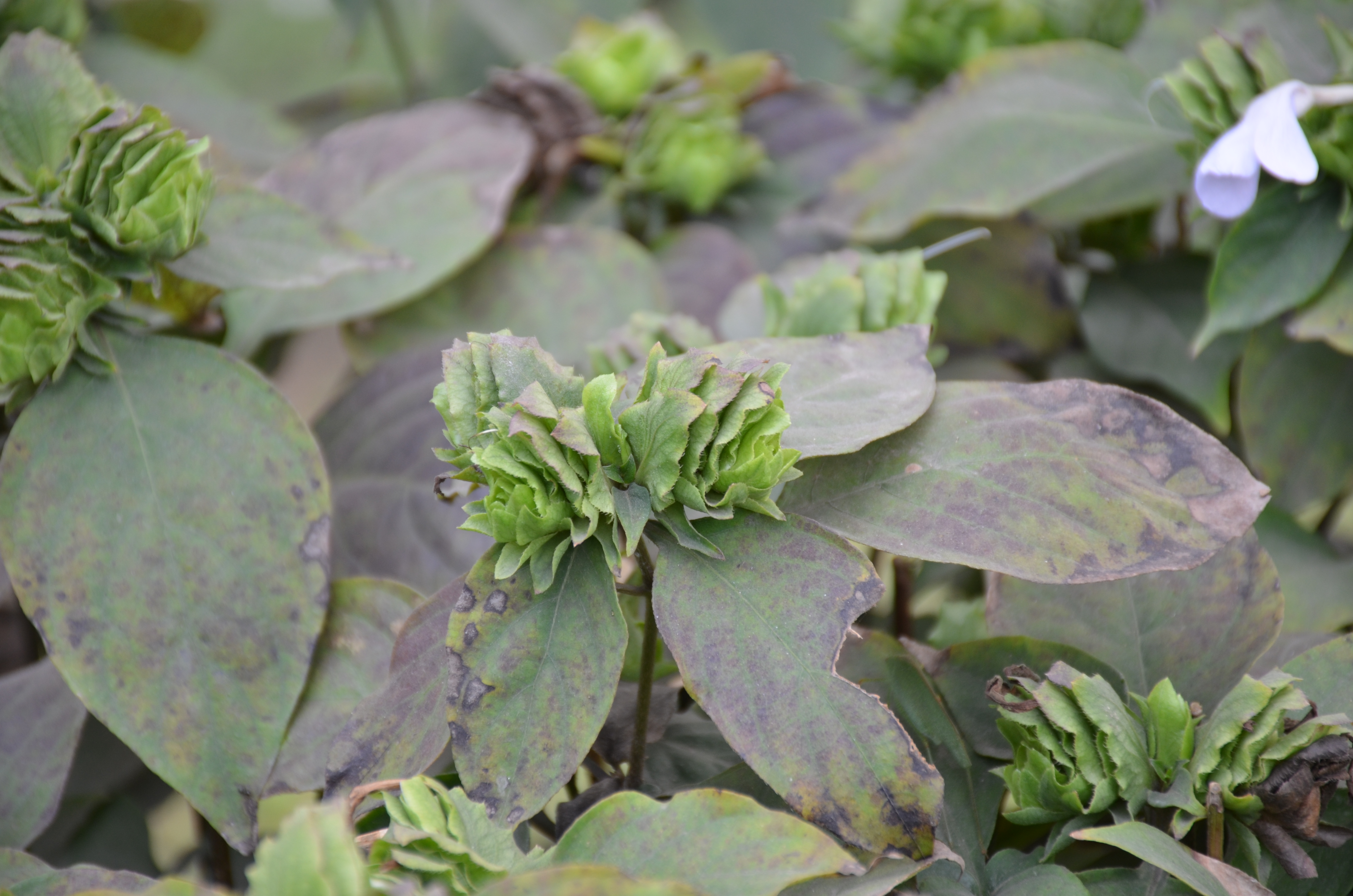
Barleria strigosa found in Kolkata, West Bengal, India

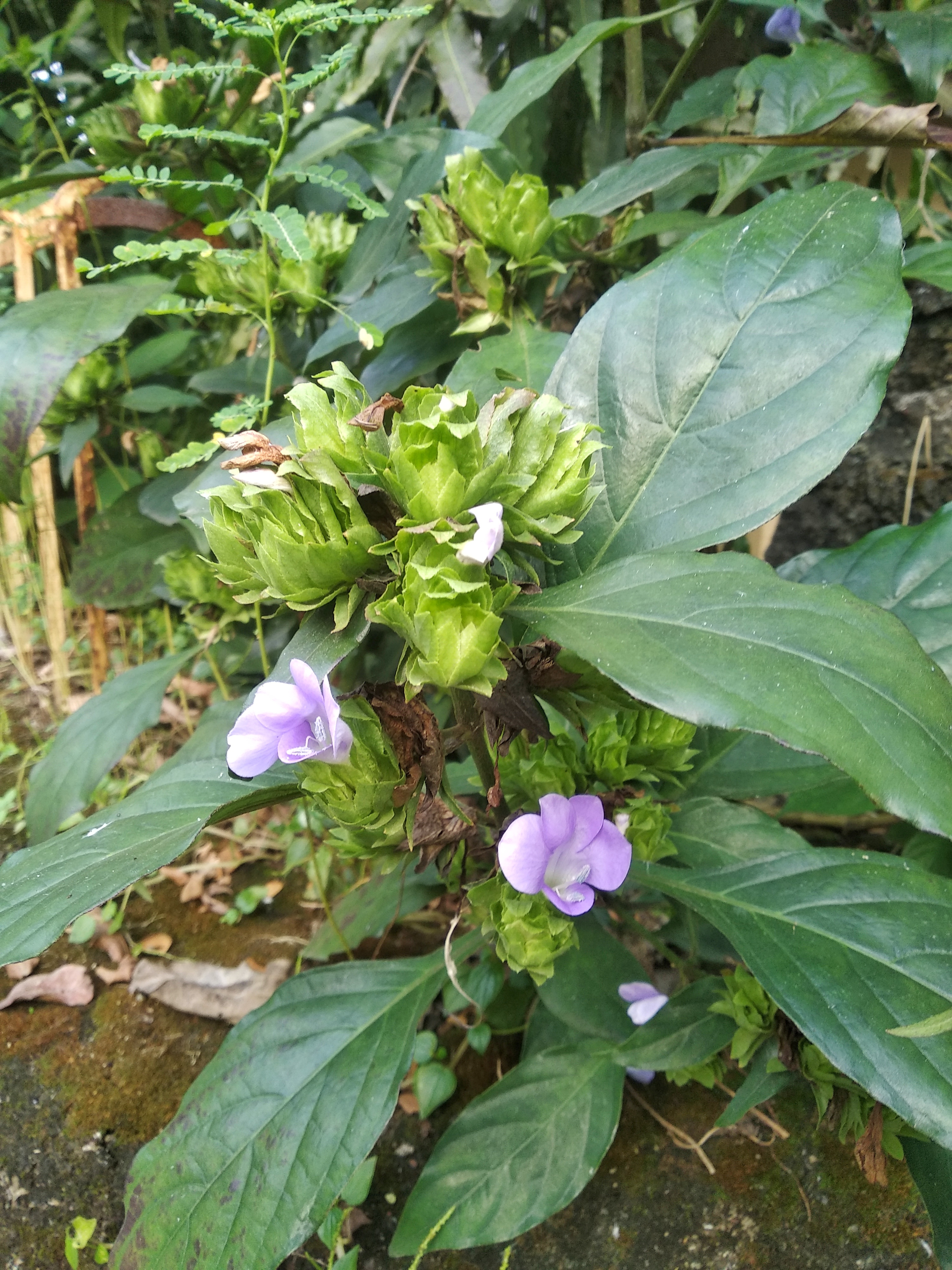
Flowers of Barleria strigosa

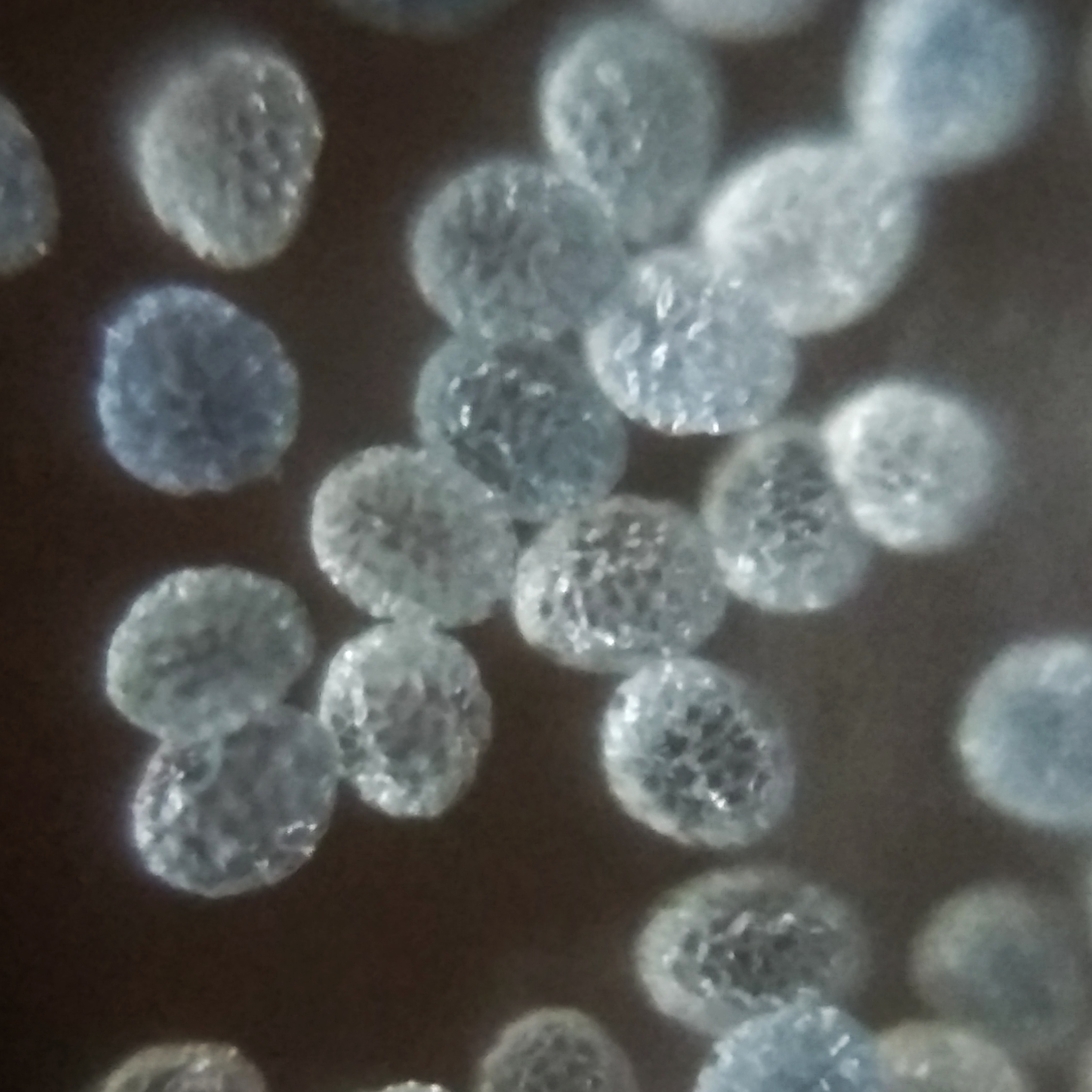
Pollens of Barleria strigosa
