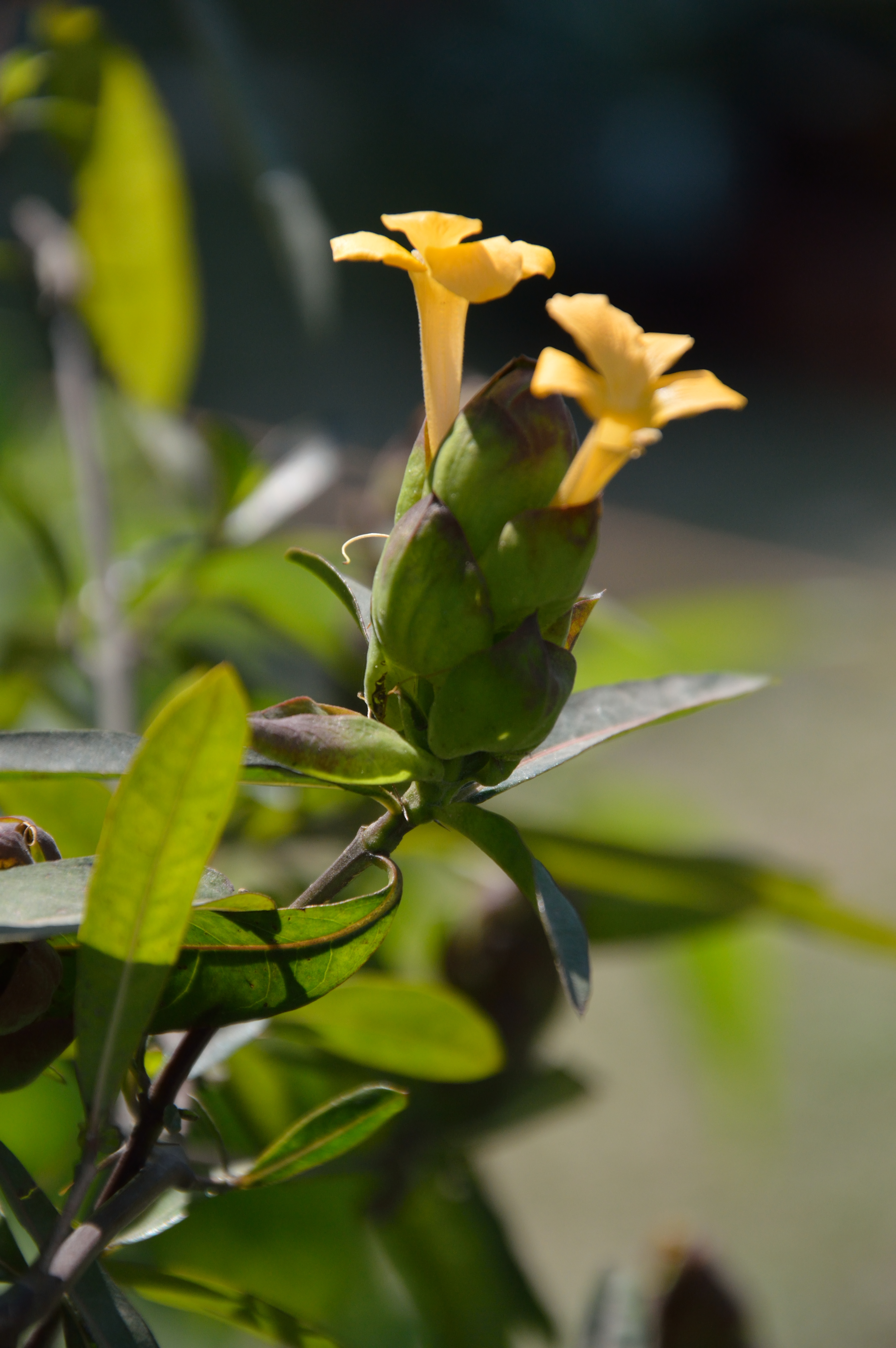

Scientific classification
- Kingdom: Plantae
- Clade: Tracheophytes
- Clade: Angiosperms
- Clade: Eudicots
- Clade: Asterids
- Order: Lamiales
- Family: Acanthaceae
- Genus: Barleria
- Species: B. lupulina

Binomial name
- Barleria lupulina Lindl.

= Barleria lupulina =

Hop-headed barleria

Species of flowering plant

Barleria lupulina, the hop-headed barleria, is a plant in the family Acanthaceae. It occurs in Southeast Asia.
