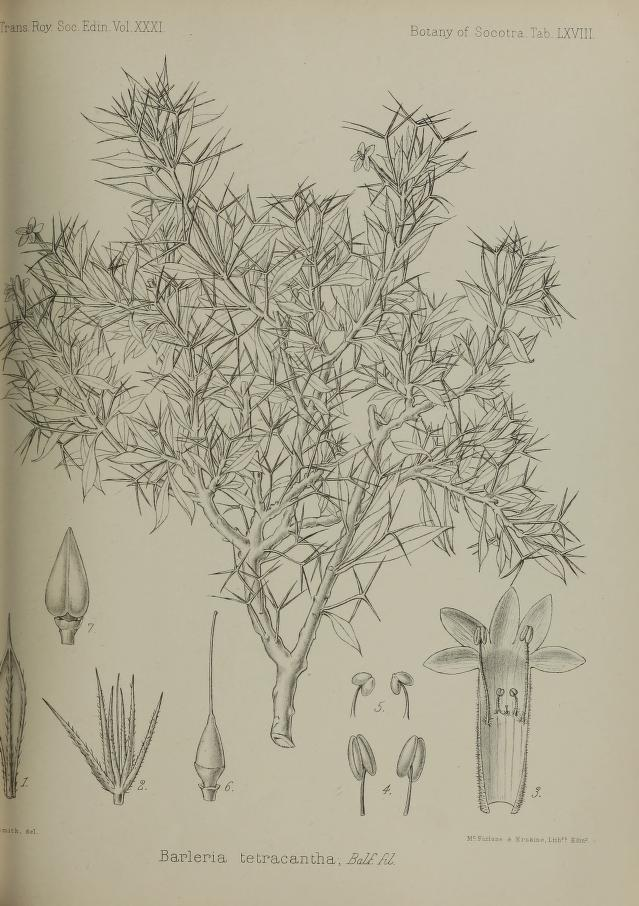

Conservation status
- Vulnerable (IUCN 3.1)

Scientific classification
- Kingdom: Plantae
- Clade: Tracheophytes
- Clade: Angiosperms
- Clade: Eudicots
- Clade: Asterids
- Order: Lamiales
- Family: Acanthaceae
- Genus: Barleria
- Species: B. tetracantha

Binomial name
- Barleria tetracantha Balf.f.

= Barleria tetracantha =

Species of plant

Barleria tetracantha is a species of flowering plant in the family Acanthaceae. It is endemic to Yemen. Its natural habitat is rocky areas.
