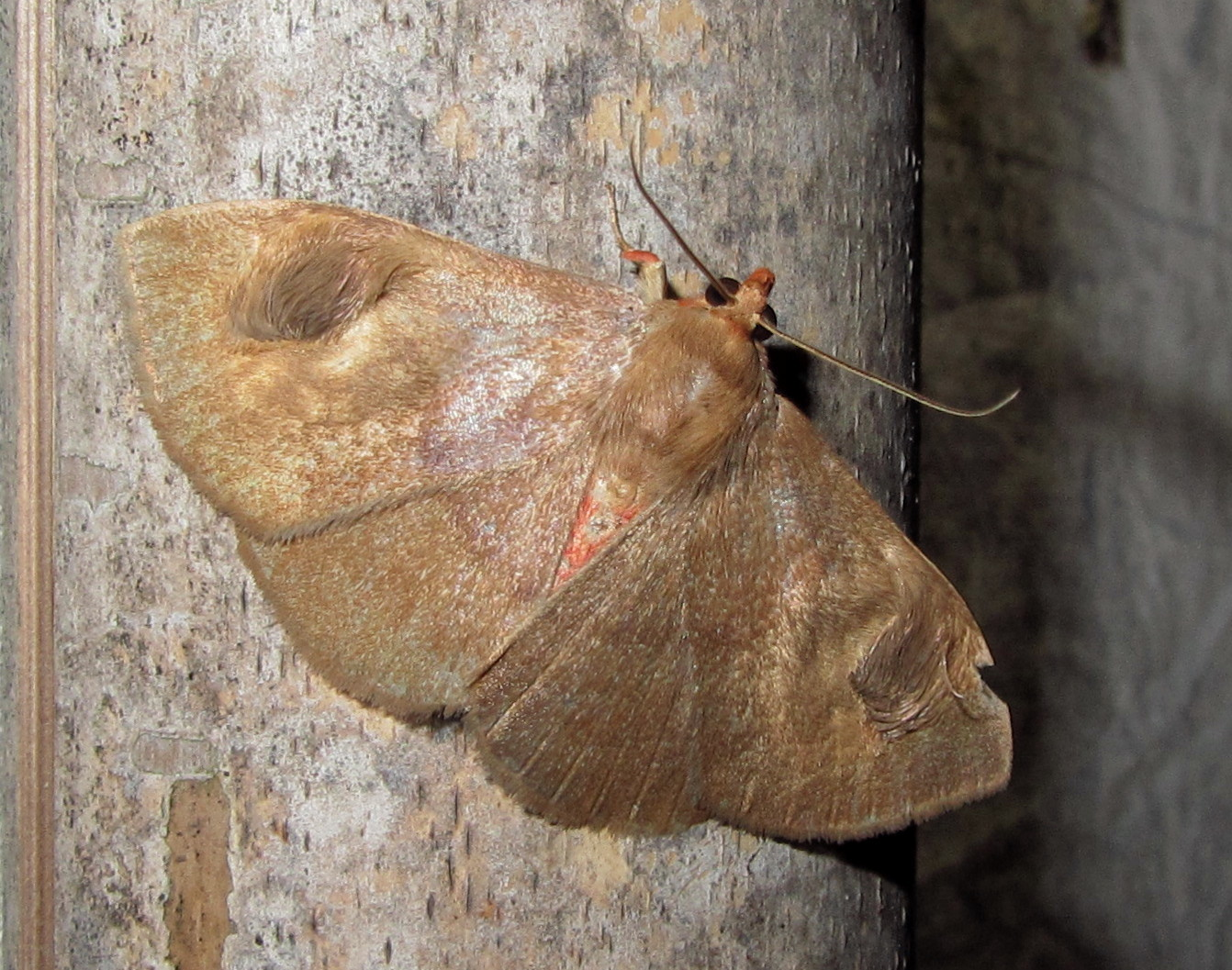

Scientific classification
- Kingdom: Animalia
- Phylum: Arthropoda
- Class: Insecta
- Order: Lepidoptera
- Superfamily: Noctuoidea
- Family: Erebidae
- Subfamily: Calpinae
- Genus: Calesia; Guenée, 1852

Synonyms
- Asymbata Gerstaecker, 1871; Caradana Moore, 1884; Lecasia Fawcett, 1916; Mecyra Walker, 1865; Pasipeda Walker, 1858; Zirona Walker, 1869

= Calesia =

Genus of moths

Calesia is a genus of moths of the family Erebidae. The genus was erected by Achille Guenée in 1852.

== Description ==
Palpi upturned and smoothly scaled, where the second joint reaching vertex of head. Third joint long and naked. Antennae ciliated and with bristles to the joints in male. Thorax, abdomen and legs smoothly scaled. Hindwings with very short cell. Larva with two pairs of abdominal prolegs.

== Species ==
- Calesia arhoda Hampson 1910
- Calesia caputrubrum Carcasson 1965
- Calesia cryptoleuca Carcasson 1965
- Calesia dasypterus (Kollar 1844)
- Calesia flabellifera Moore 1878
- Calesia flaviceps Hampson 1926
- Calesia fuscicorpus Hampson 1891
- Calesia gastropachoides Guenée 1852
- Calesia haemorrhoa Guenée 1852
- Calesia hirtisquama Hampson 1926
- Calesia karschi (Bartel 1903)
- Calesia marginata (Walker 1869)
- Calesia nigriannulata Hampson 1926
- Calesia nigriventris Aurivillius 1909
- Calesia othello (Fawcett 1916)
- Calesia pellio Felder & Rogenhofer 1874
- Calesia phaiosoma (Hampson 1891)
- Calesia proxantha Hampson 1895
- Calesia rhodotela Hampson 1926
- Calesia roseiceps Hampson 1894
- Calesia rufipalpis (Walker 1858)
- Calesia simplex Snellen 1880
- Calesia stillifera Felder & Rogenhofer 1874
- Calesia thermantis Hampson 1926
- Calesia vinolia Swinhoe 1903
- Calesia xanthognatha Hampson 1926
- Calesia zambesita Walker 1865
