= Calesia rufipalpis =

Scientific classification
- Kingdom: Animalia
- Phylum: Arthropoda
- Clade: Pancrustacea
- Class: Insecta
- Order: Lepidoptera
- Superfamily: Noctuoidea
- Family: Erebidae
- Genus: Calesia
- Species: C. rufipalpis

Binomial name
- Calesia rufipalpis Walker, 1858

Species of moth

Calesia rufipalpis is a moth of the family Noctuidae first described by Francis Walker in 1858. It is found in Sri Lanka.
