= Barleria elegans =

Scientific classification
- Kingdom: Plantae
- Clade: Tracheophytes
- Clade: Angiosperms
- Clade: Eudicots
- Clade: Asterids
- Order: Lamiales
- Family: Acanthaceae
- Genus: Barleria
- Species: B. elegans

Binomial name
- Barleria elegans S.Moore ex C.B.Clarke

Species of flowering plant

Barleria elegans (Common names: Eng.: white bushveld barleria; Afr.: wit bosviooltjie) is a species of plant in the family Acanthaceae. It is a spiny perennial herb or subshrub native to Angola and Namibia, and to Mozambique, Zimbabwe, Eswatini, and the Northern Provinces and KwaZulu-Natal in South Africa.

Two subspecies are accepted:

- Barleria elegans subsp. elegans – Angola and northwestern Namibia
- Barleria elegans subsp. orientalis I.Darbysh. – Mozambique, Zimbabwe, Eswatini, Northern Provinces, and KwaZulu-Natal
