= Barleria popovii =

Conservation status
- Endangered (IUCN 3.1)

Scientific classification
- Kingdom: Plantae
- Clade: Tracheophytes
- Clade: Angiosperms
- Clade: Eudicots
- Clade: Asterids
- Order: Lamiales
- Family: Acanthaceae
- Genus: Barleria
- Species: B. popovii

Binomial name
- Barleria popovii Verdc.

Species of flowering plant

Barleria popovii is a species of plant in the family Acanthaceae. It is endemic to the island of Socotra in Yemen. It is an attractive shrub or small tree, with large white night-flowering flowers. It is a rare plant native to the central Hajhir Mountains, where it grows in sheltered submontane woodland from 600 to 750 meters elevation. It has a small but stable population, and the IUCN Red List assesses the species as Endangered.

The species was first described by Bernard Verdcourt in 1966.
