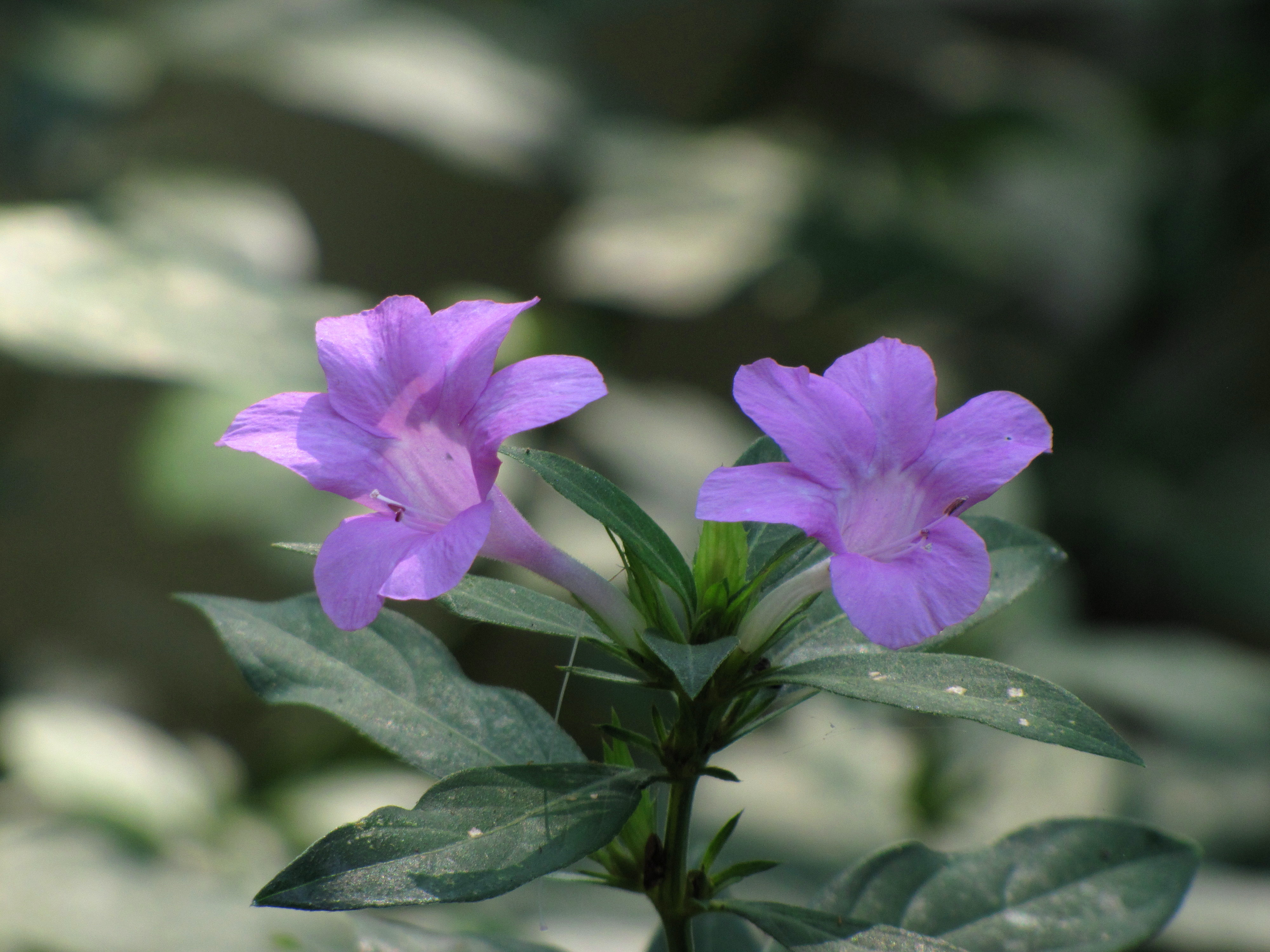

Scientific classification
- Kingdom: Plantae
- Clade: Tracheophytes
- Clade: Angiosperms
- Clade: Eudicots
- Clade: Asterids
- Order: Lamiales
- Family: Acanthaceae
- Genus: Barleria
- Species: B. siamensis

Binomial name
- Barleria siamensis Craib

= Barleria siamensis =

Siamese barleria

Species of flowering plant

Barleria siamensis, the Siamese barleria, is a plant in the family Acanthaceae. It occurs in southern Asia.
