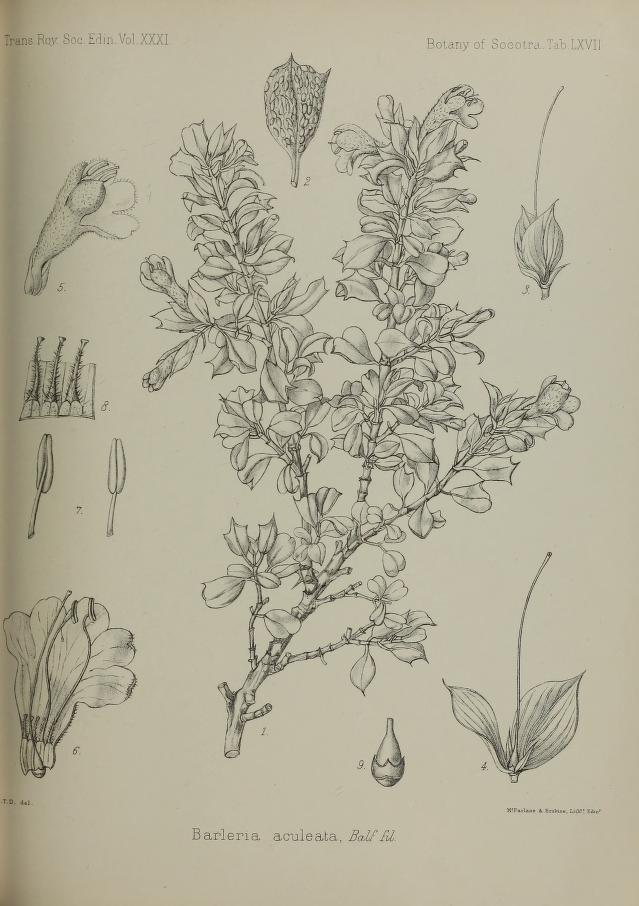
- Barleria aculeata, Balf.fil.

Conservation status
- Least Concern (IUCN 3.1)

Scientific classification
- Kingdom: Plantae
- Clade: Tracheophytes
- Clade: Angiosperms
- Clade: Eudicots
- Clade: Asterids
- Order: Lamiales
- Family: Acanthaceae
- Genus: Barleria
- Species: B. aculeata

Binomial name
- Barleria aculeata Balf.f.

= Barleria aculeata =

Species of plant

Barleria aculeata is a species of plant in the family Acanthaceae. It is a subshrub or shrub endemic to Socotra. Its natural habitat is subtropical or tropical dry forests.
