= Calesia stillifera =

Scientific classification
- Kingdom: Animalia
- Phylum: Arthropoda
- Clade: Pancrustacea
- Class: Insecta
- Order: Lepidoptera
- Superfamily: Noctuoidea
- Family: Erebidae
- Genus: Calesia
- Species: C. stillifera

Binomial name
- Calesia stillifera Felder, 1874

Species of moth

Calesia stillifera is a moth of the family Noctuidae first described by Felder in 1874. It is found in India, Sri Lanka, Thailand, Cambodia, Vietnam, Hong Kong, China and the Philippines.

== Description ==
The wingspan of the male is about 36 mm. Antennae ciliate. Head, collar, coxa of forelegs and tibiae are fulvous. Thorax and base of abdomen are fuscous brown, with the remainder of abdomen crimson above. Wings are fuscous brown generally. Forewings with a large white spot at the end of the cell. Hindwings are uniform fuscous brown. Palpi are upturned and smoothly scaled. Tibiae with a terminal black spot. Caterpillars are known to feed on Lepidagathis incurva and Thunbergia alata.
