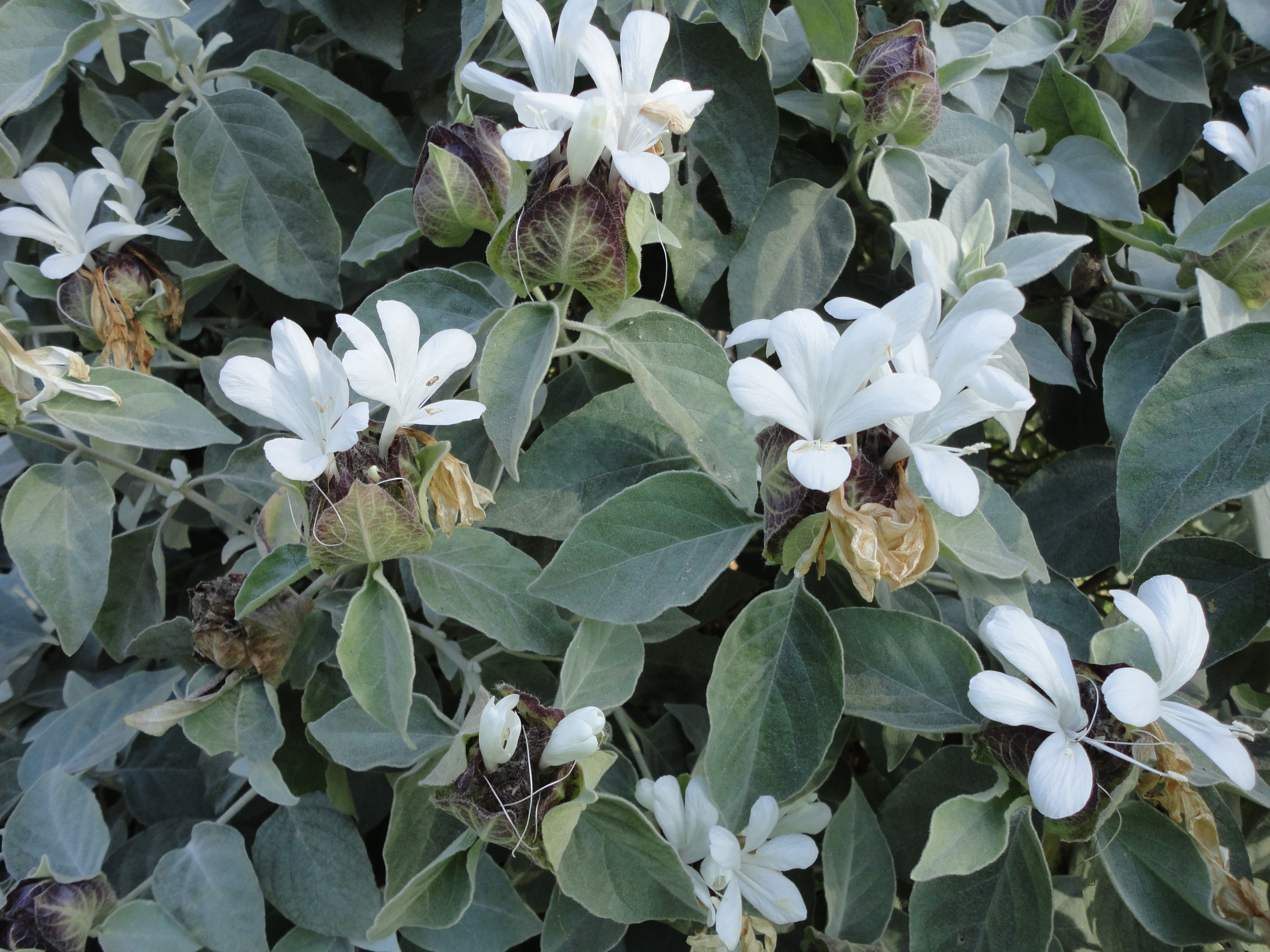

Scientific classification
- Kingdom: Plantae
- Clade: Tracheophytes
- Clade: Angiosperms
- Clade: Eudicots
- Clade: Asterids
- Order: Lamiales
- Family: Acanthaceae
- Genus: Barleria
- Species: B. albostellata

Binomial name
- Barleria albostellata C.B.Clarke

= Barleria albostellata =

Grey barleria

Species of flowering plant

Barleria albostellata, the grey barleria, is a plant species in the family Acanthaceae. It occurs in subtropical woodland areas of South Africa and Zimbabwe.
