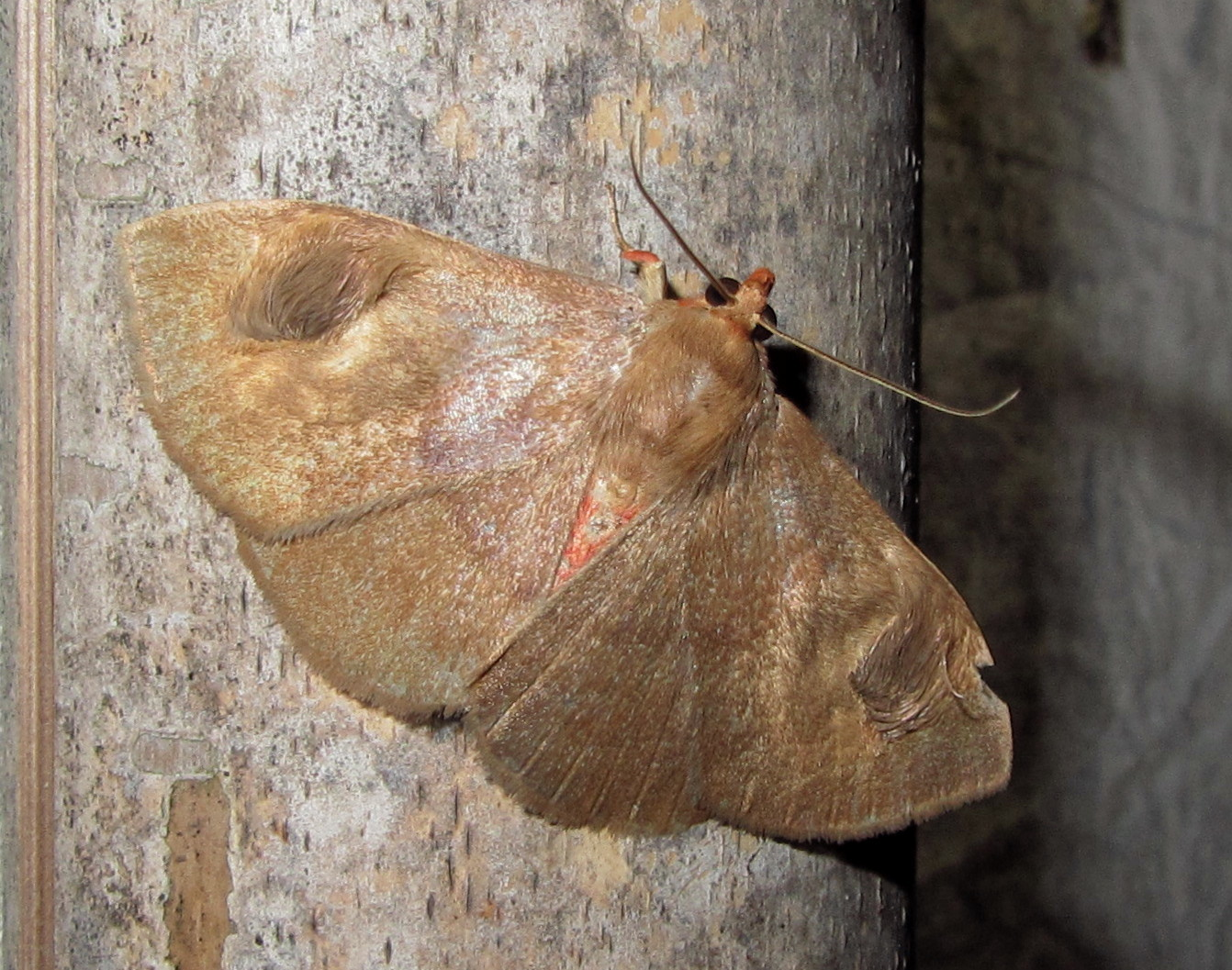

Scientific classification
- Domain: Eukaryota
- Kingdom: Animalia
- Phylum: Arthropoda
- Class: Insecta
- Order: Lepidoptera
- Superfamily: Noctuoidea
- Family: Erebidae
- Genus: Calesia
- Species: C. dasyptera

Binomial name
- Calesia dasyptera (Kollar, 1844)

Synonyms
- Erebus dasypterus Kollar, 1844; Calesia comosa Guenée, 1852; Erebus leucostigma Kollar, 1844; Calesia stigmoleuca Guenée, 1852; Calesia dasypterus (Kollar, 1844)

= Calesia dasyptera =

Species of moth

Calesia dasyptera is a moth of the family Noctuidae first described by Vincenz Kollar in 1844. It is found in Asia, including Taiwan, India and Sri Lanka.

== Description ==
The wingspan of the male is about 50 mm and 40 mm in the female. Forewings with a very large tuft of hair beyond the cell below costa in male, and the costal nervules curved. Forewings with veins 8 to 10 stalked in both sexes. Male has greyish red-brown base color. Head, collar and abdomen crimson. Coxa of forelegs and tibia of forelegs and midlegs are crimson. Female has a white spot at end of cell of forewings.
