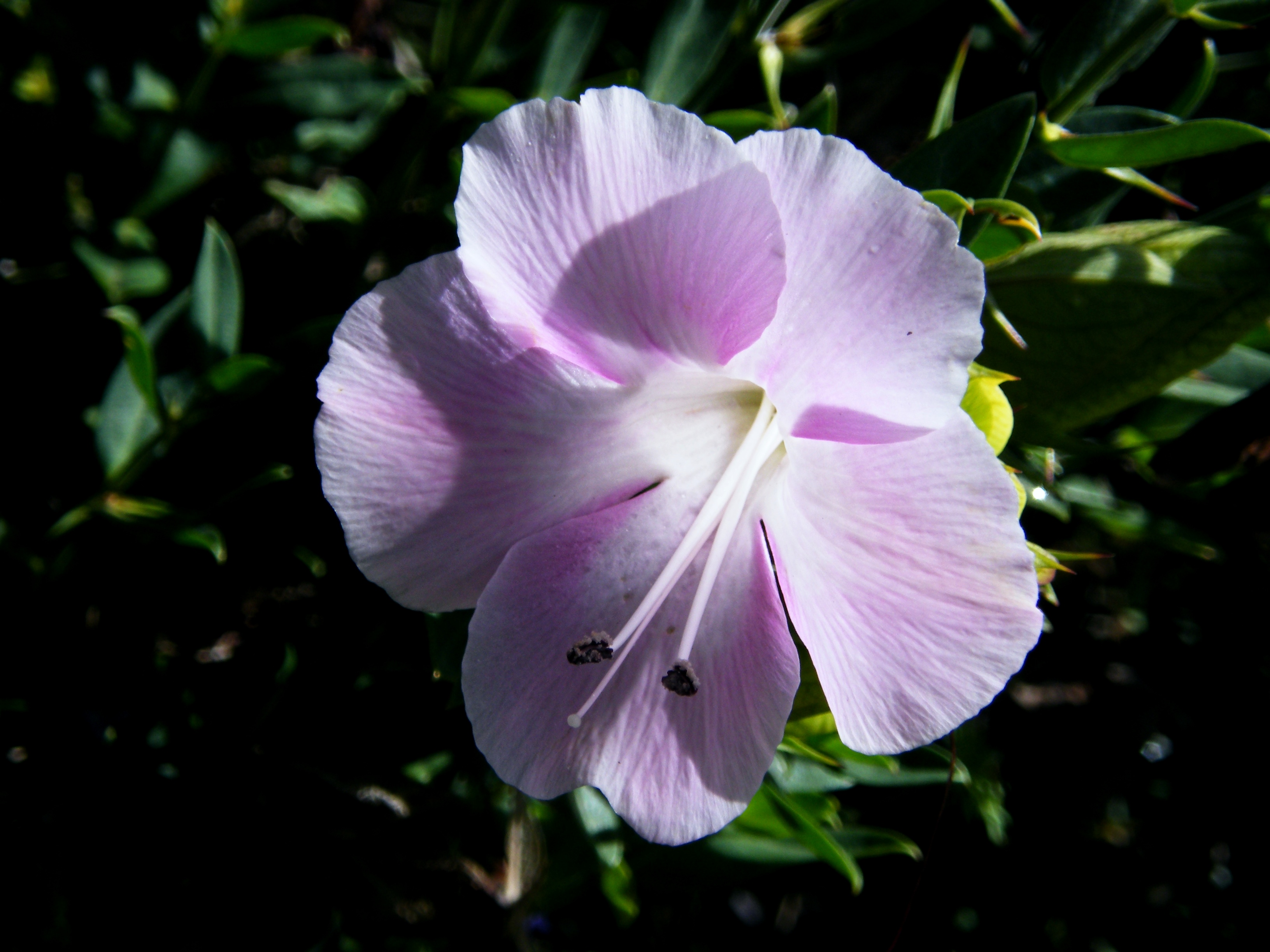

Scientific classification
- Kingdom: Plantae
- Clade: Tracheophytes
- Clade: Angiosperms
- Clade: Eudicots
- Clade: Asterids
- Order: Lamiales
- Family: Acanthaceae
- Genus: Barleria
- Species: B. greenii

Binomial name
- Barleria greenii M.Balkwill & K.Balkwill

= Barleria greenii =

Green's barleria

Species of flowering plant

Barleria greenii (Green's barleria, or wild bush petunia), is a plant in the family Acanthaceae. It is endemic to a small area near Estcourt in KwaZulu-Natal, South Africa.
