= Barleria opaca =

Scientific classification
- Kingdom: Plantae
- Clade: Tracheophytes
- Clade: Angiosperms
- Clade: Eudicots
- Clade: Asterids
- Order: Lamiales
- Family: Acanthaceae
- Genus: Barleria
- Species: B. opaca

Binomial name
- Barleria opaca (Vahl.) Nees

Species of flowering plant

Barleria opaca is a shrub in the botanical family Acanthaceae.
