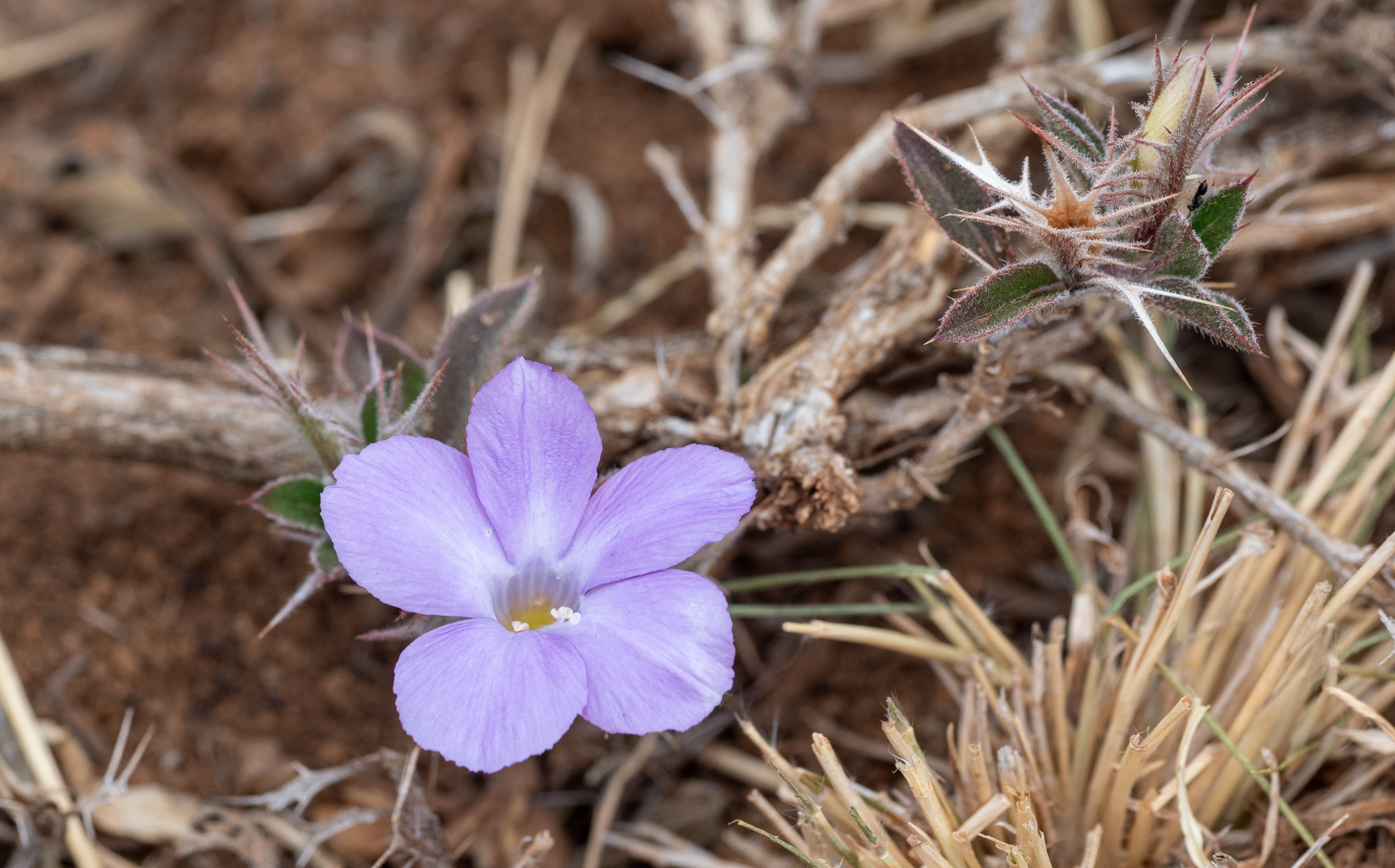
- Barleria delamerei

Scientific classification
- Kingdom: Plantae
- Clade: Tracheophytes
- Clade: Angiosperms
- Clade: Eudicots
- Clade: Asterids
- Order: Lamiales
- Family: Acanthaceae
- Subfamily: Acanthoideae
- Tribe: Barlerieae
- Genus: Barleria; L. (1753)

Synonyms
- List: Barleriacanthus Oerst. (1855); Barlerianthus Oerst. (1855); Barleriopsis Oerst. (1855); Barleriosiphon Oerst. (1855); Barlerites Oerst. (1855); Barreliera J.F.Gmel. (1792); Crabbea Harv. (1838), nom. rej.; Dicranacanthus Oerst. (1855); Isaloa Humbert (1937); Parabarleria Baill. (1890); Prionitis Oerst.; Pseudobarleria Oerst.; Prionitis Oerst. (1854), nom. illeg.; Pseudobarleria Oerst. (1855); Somalia Oliv. (1886); Soubeyrania Neck. (1790), opus utique oppr.; Wahabia Fenzl (1844), nom. nud.

= Barleria =

Genus of flowering plants

Barleria is a genus of plants in the family Acanthaceae. It includes 303 species native to the tropics and subtropics, including the Americas from Mexico to northern South America, sub-Saharan Africa, Egypt and the Arabian Peninsula, the Indian subcontinent, Indochina, southern China and Taiwan, parts of Malesia, and New Guinea.

Some species include:

- Barleria acanthoides Vahl
- Barleria aculeata Balf.f.
- Barleria albostellata C.B.Clarke, the grey barleria
- Barleria compacta Malombe & I.Darbysh.
- Barleria cristata L., the crested Philippine violet
- Barleria delamerei
- Barleria elegans S.Moore
- Barleria greenii M.&K.Balkwill, Green's barleria
- Barleria lupulina Lindl., the hop-headed barleria or snake bush
- Barleria mysorensis B.Heyne ex Roth
- Barleria observatrix Bosser & Heine
- Barleria obtusa Nees, the bush violet
- Barleria oenotheroides Dum.Cours.
- Barleria opaca (Vahl) Nees
- Barleria popovii Verdc.
- Barleria pretoriensis C.B.Clarke
- Barleria prionitis L., the porcupine flower
- Barleria repens Nees, the small bush violet
- Barleria rotundifolia Oberm.
- Barleria siamensis Craib
- Barleria strigosa Willd.
- Barleria tetracantha Balf.f.
