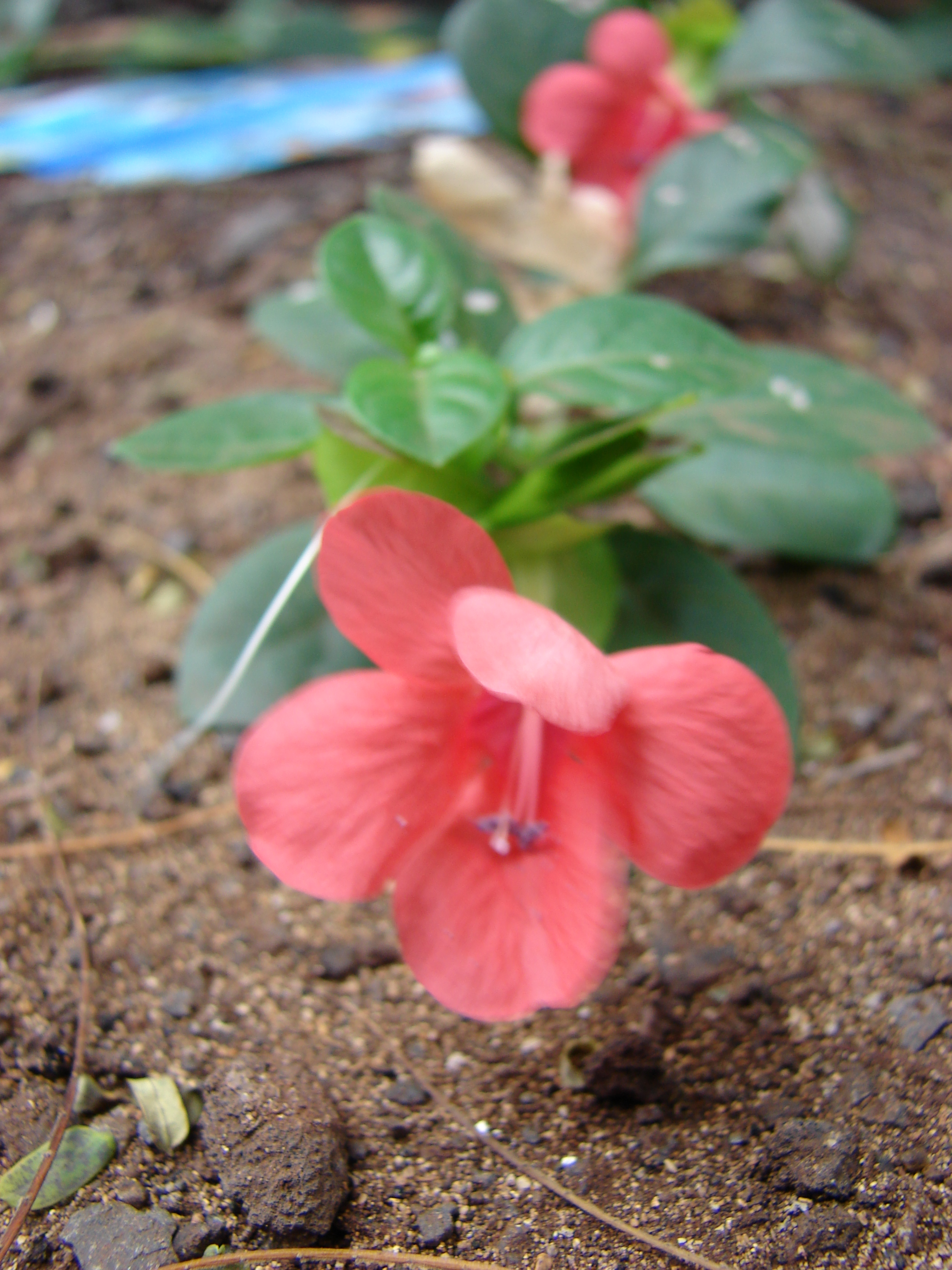

Scientific classification
- Kingdom: Plantae
- Clade: Tracheophytes
- Clade: Angiosperms
- Clade: Eudicots
- Clade: Asterids
- Order: Lamiales
- Family: Acanthaceae
- Genus: Barleria
- Species: B. repens

Binomial name
- Barleria repens Nees

= Barleria repens =

Small bush violet

Species of flowering plant

Barleria repens, the small bush violet, also known as the coral creeper, is a plant in the family Acanthaceae. It occurs in forests and woodlands from tropical Africa to South Africa. It can handle shade but prefers full sun in sandy soils.

== Invasive ==
It is reported to be naturalised in Queensland, New South Wales, Hawaii, Florida, and many other smaller populations may be present throughout the tropics and subtropics.

It is very adaptable to a variety of situations and is known to propagate in disturbed areas, such as compost, garden waste, and in drains.

== Appearance ==
The coral creeper is a prostrate ground cover or shrub, which roots when making contact with the ground, which allows it to colonize large areas. It flowers in late summer or autumn.
