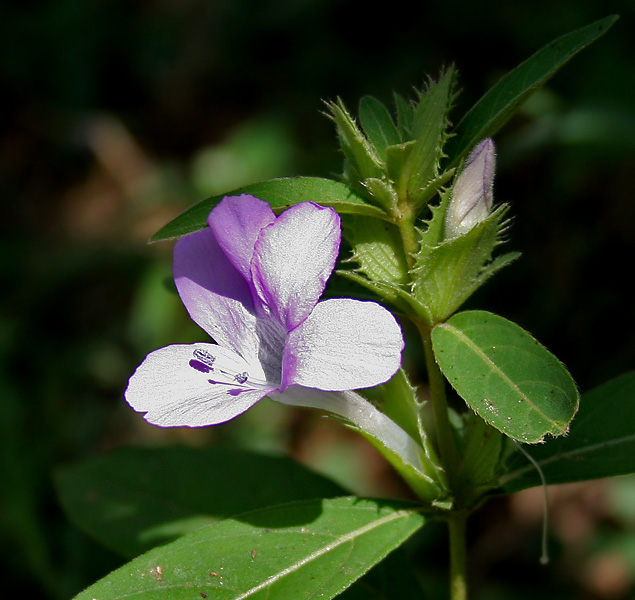

Scientific classification
- Kingdom: Plantae
- Clade: Embryophytes
- Clade: Tracheophytes
- Clade: Spermatophytes
- Clade: Angiosperms
- Clade: Eudicots
- Clade: Asterids
- Order: Lamiales
- Family: Acanthaceae
- Genus: Barleria
- Species: B. cristata

Binomial name
- Barleria cristata L.

= Barleria cristata =

Philippine violet

Species of plant

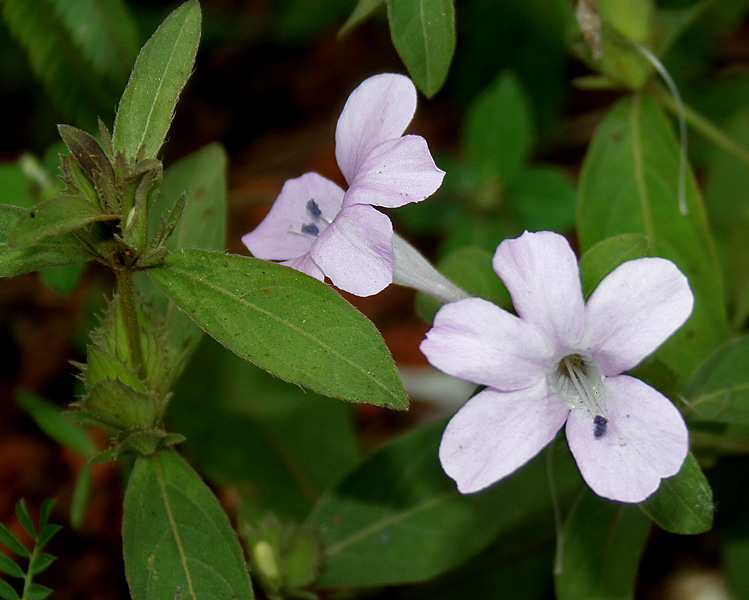
at Ananthagiri Hills, in Vikarabad district of Telangana, India.

Barleria cristata, the Philippine violet, bluebell barleria or crested Philippine violet, is a plant species in the family Acanthaceae.

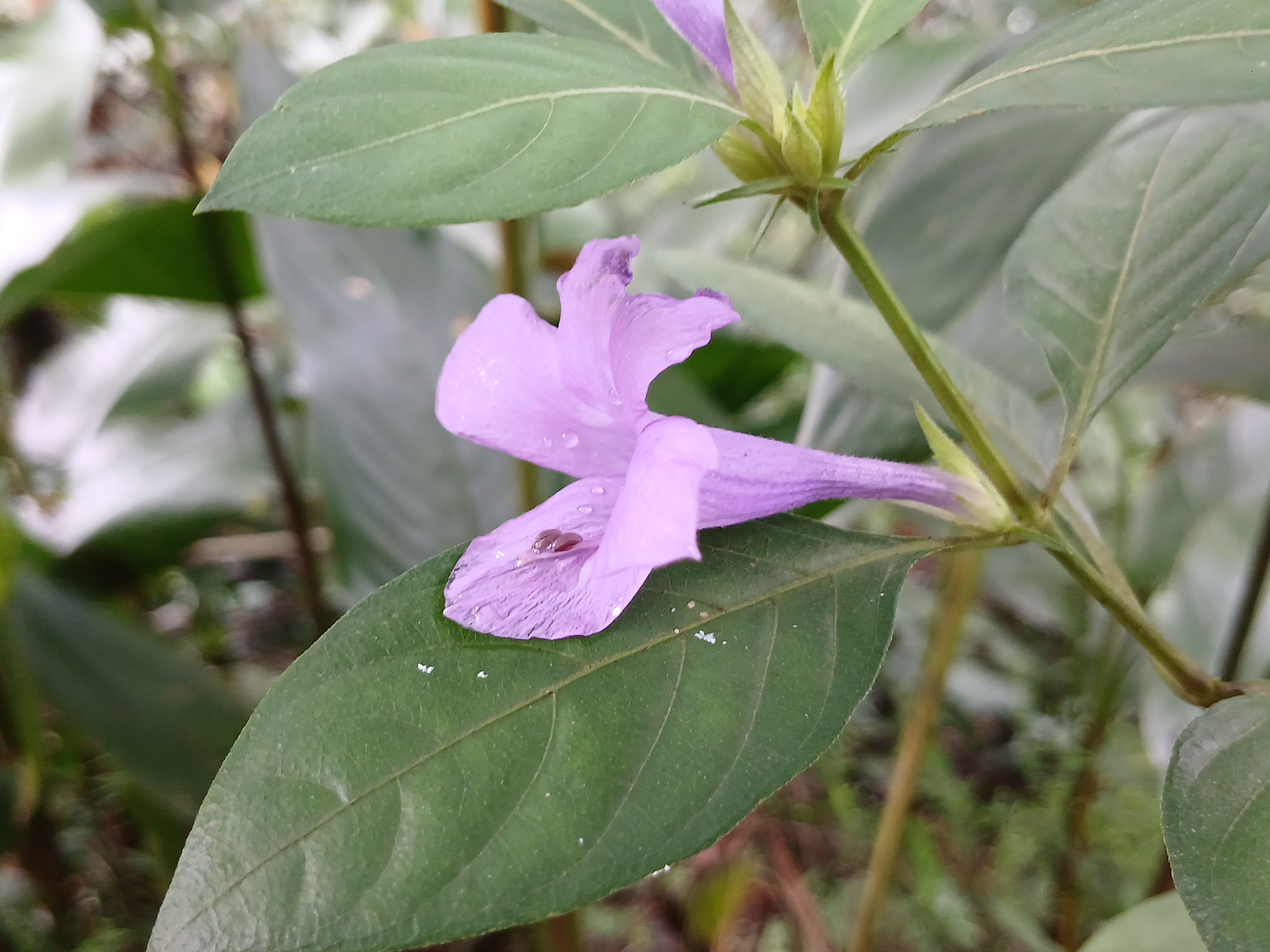
Philippine violet

== Distribution and habitat ==
It is native to a wide area ranging from Southern China to India, Pakistan and Myanmar.

Cultivated as an ornamental plant in villages and gardens, it has become naturalized in Hawaii, where it grows in dry habitats. In Fiji, where it is known as "tombithi" and in Christmas Island (Indian Ocean), the shrub grows also as a ruderal species along roadsides and disturbed areas from near sea level to about 100 m.

== Description ==
It grows as a shrub 60 –100 cm tall. The leaves are dark green on the upper surface and pale green on the lower surface. They are elliptic to narrowly ovate. The flowers are about 5 cm long, funnel-shaped in violet, pink, or white color. The fruits are about 1.5 cm long ellipsoid capsules. They become glabrous and glossy at maturity.

== Uses ==
Known as อังกาบ, this plant is used in Thailand as a traditional herbal remedy. It allegedly acts as a tonic, diuretic and blood purifier. To ensure intake of this plant, for medicinal purposes, is safe and nontoxic, studies were conducted on mice and found no side effects or death with fixed amount of dosage: 250g/kg dosage.

In South India, it is known as December Flower as it blooms in December and is normally strung into garlands of flowers for women to wear in their hair. In Telugu the flowers are called Decembaralu(plural), In Tamil it is known as December Poo.

== Gallery ==
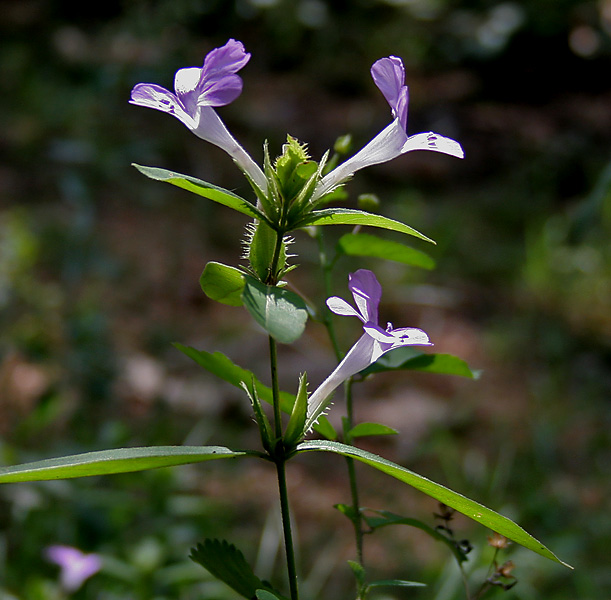
in Narsapur, Medak district, India

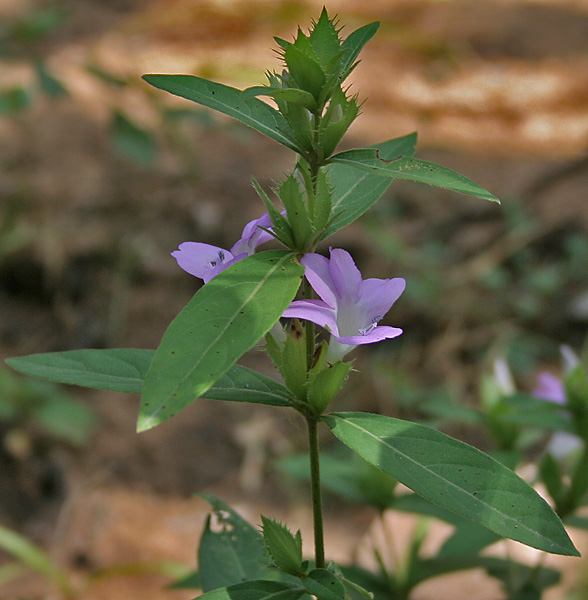
in Narsapur, Medak district, India

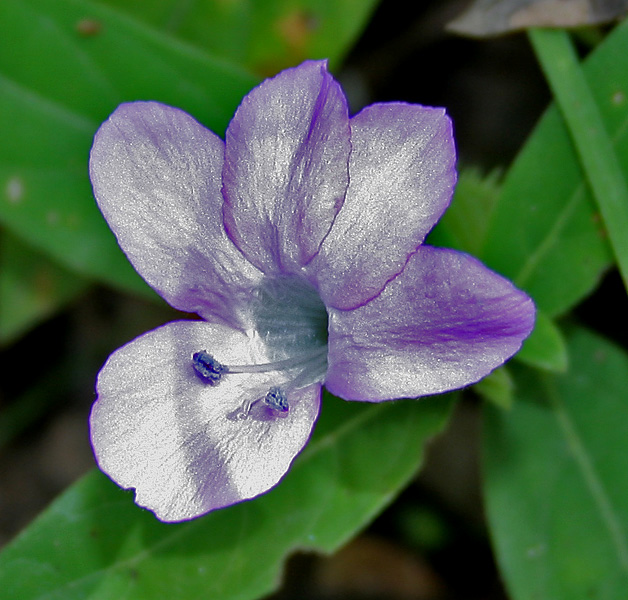
in Narsapur, Medak district, India

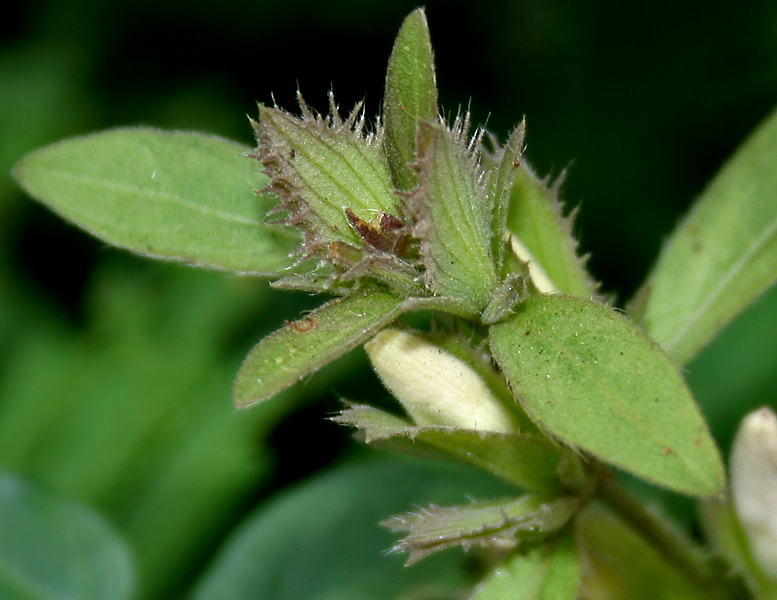
at Ananthagiri Hills, in Rangareddy district of Andhra Pradesh, India.

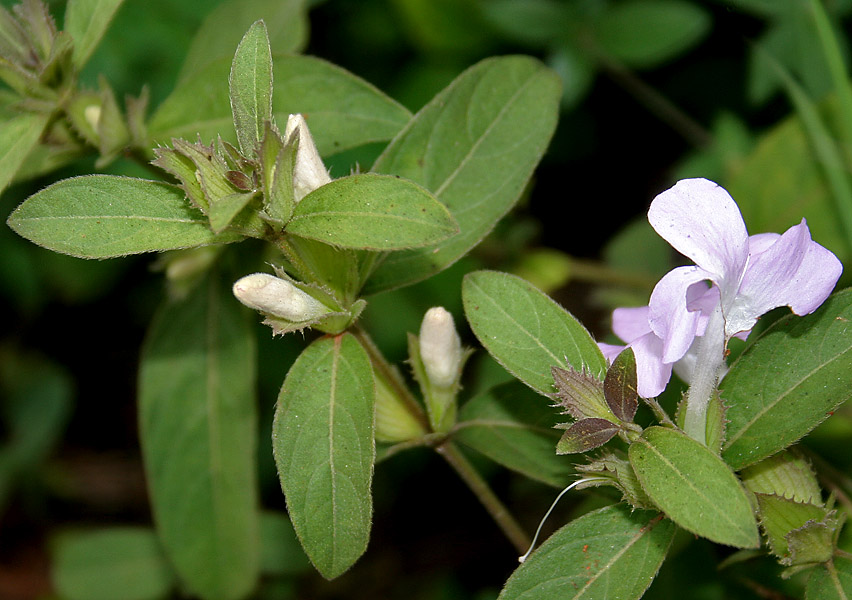
at Ananthagiri Hills, in Rangareddy district of Andhra Pradesh, India.

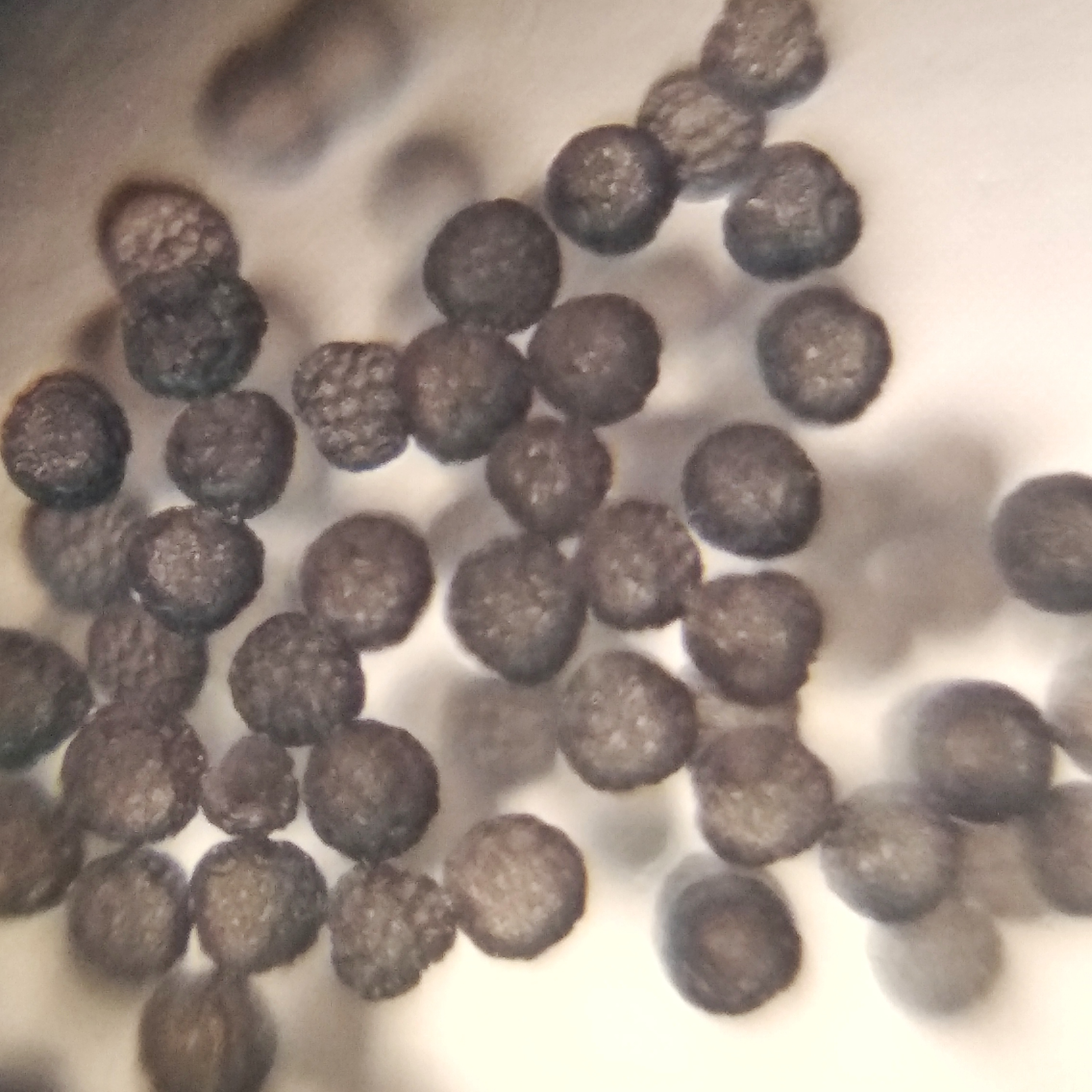
Pollens of Barleria cristata at Ranchi

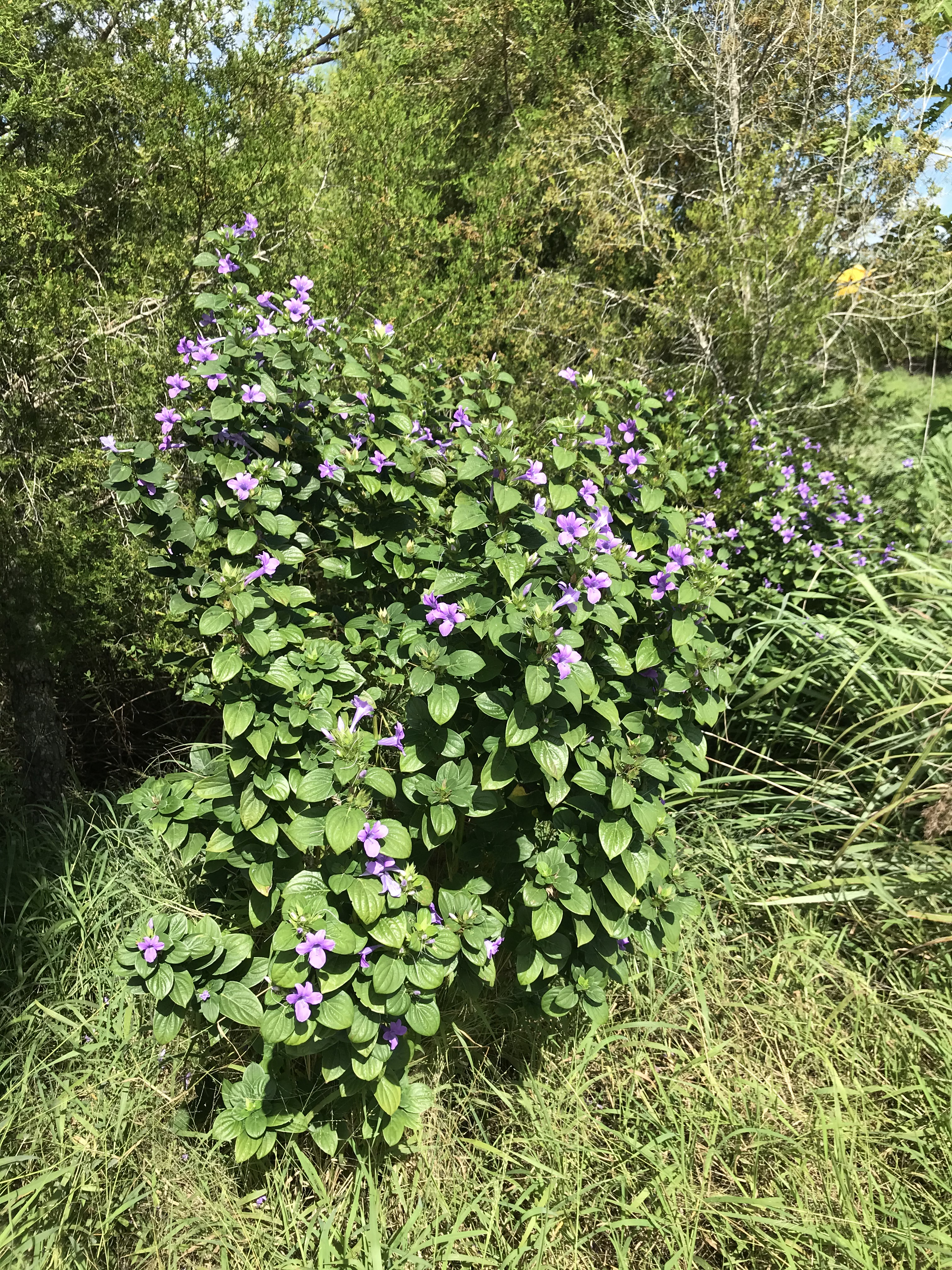
Barleria cristata growing wild in central Florida
