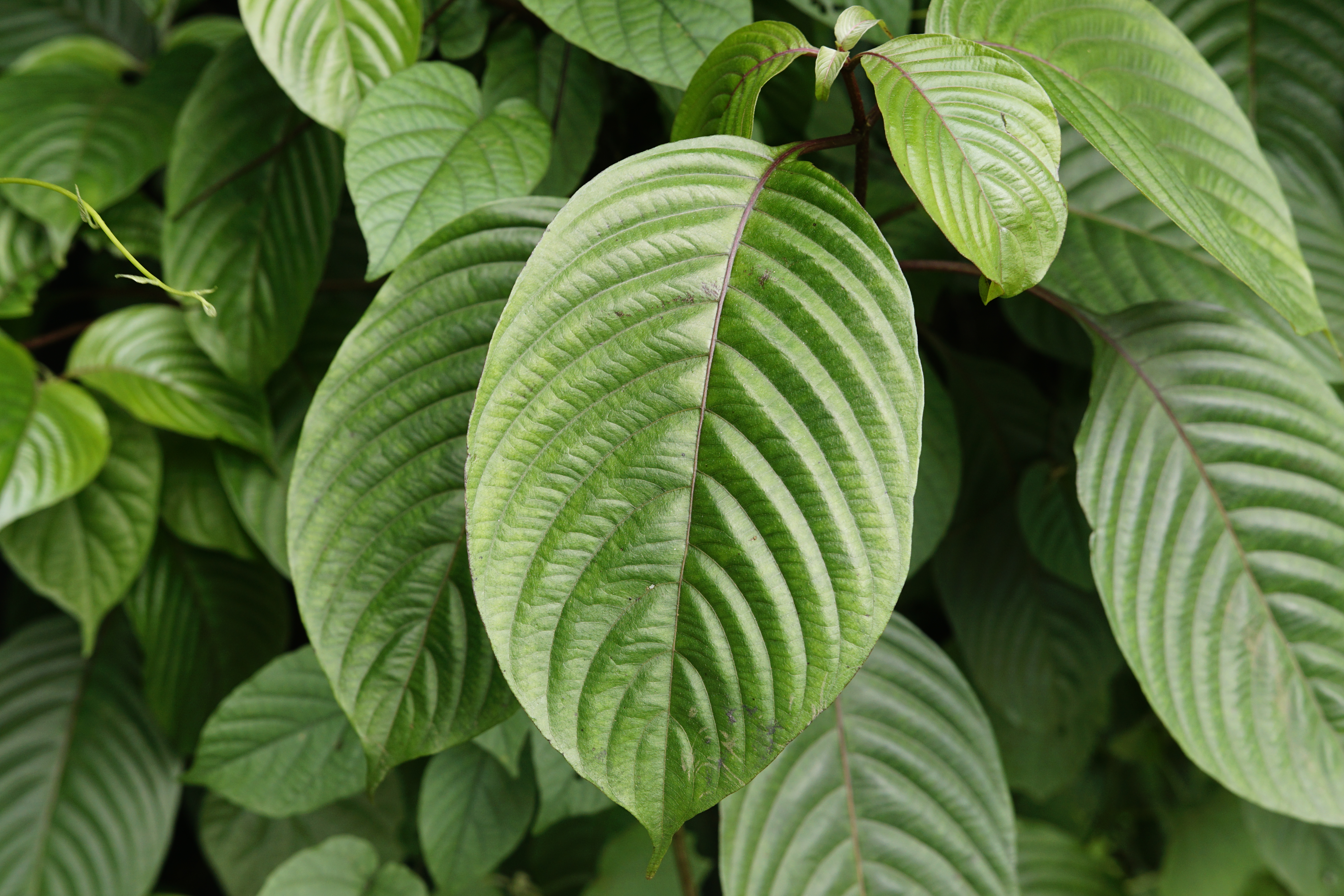
- Leaves

Scientific classification
- Kingdom: Plantae
- Clade: Tracheophytes
- Clade: Angiosperms
- Clade: Eudicots
- Clade: Asterids
- Order: Lamiales
- Family: Acanthaceae
- Genus: Justicia
- Species: J. wynaadensis

Binomial name
- Justicia wynaadensis (Nees) T.Anderson

= Justicia wynaadensis =

Species of plant

Justicia wynaadensis is a small shrub or climber belonging to the family Acanthaceae, native to the Western Ghats region of South India, found in places such as Wayanad, Kodagu, Nilgiris, and Malabar Hills at elevations up to 3000 feet.

== Etymology ==
The genus name "Justicia" honors the Scottish botanist James Justice, who contributed significantly to horticulture and botany in the 18th century. The species epithet "wynaadensis" refers to the Wayanad region in Kerala, India, where the species was first described and is commonly found, thus highlighting its geographic origin and endemic status in the Western Ghats biodiversity hotspot.

== Description ==
Justicia wynaadensis exhibits a slender, smooth, and terete stem that typically grows 2 to 3 meters in length. Its leaves are opposite, elliptic-lanceolate, ranging 5 to 10 cm long with 6 to 8 pairs of prominent veins. The plant produces flowers in pairs on drooping spikes approximately 5 to 10 cm long; these flowers have a hairy throat and a glabrous ovary. Flowering occurs mainly from November to March. The shrub thrives in moist deciduous and evergreen forests as well as on forest margins and roadsides within the Western Ghats, adapting well to elevations up to 3000 feet.

== Chemical composition ==
Phytochemical analyses of Justicia wynaadensis show the presence of various bioactive constituents, including alkaloids, steroids, flavonoids, cardiac glycosides, and polyphenols. These compounds contribute to the plant's medicinal potential by providing antioxidant, anti-inflammatory, antibacterial, antifungal, and cytotoxic activities. Notably, the presence of 4′-Trihydroxyflavone and other flavonoids has been highlighted as important for combating multidrug-resistant strains of microorganisms.

== Native medicinal usage ==
Indigenous communities in the Western Ghats, particularly the Kodava tribe, have used Justicia wynaadensis traditionally during the monsoon period (July to August) when the plant is believed to be at peak potency. The juice or purple-colored extract derived from the leaves is applied as a remedy to boost immunity, control blood sugar and blood pressure, and improve skin health. Ethnobotanical documentation attributes its therapeutic effects to the antioxidant and anti-inflammatory properties of the plant, also recognizing it as an immunomodulatory agent among local practitioners.

== Habitat and distribution ==
Endemic to the tropical Western Ghats, Justicia wynaadensis is found in moist deciduous and evergreen forests, forest edges, and roadsides at altitudes up to 3000 feet. It is considered a valuable constituent of the Western Ghats flora, contributing to the region's rich medicinal plant diversity. Its conservation is important due to its restricted range and ethnomedicinal significance.
