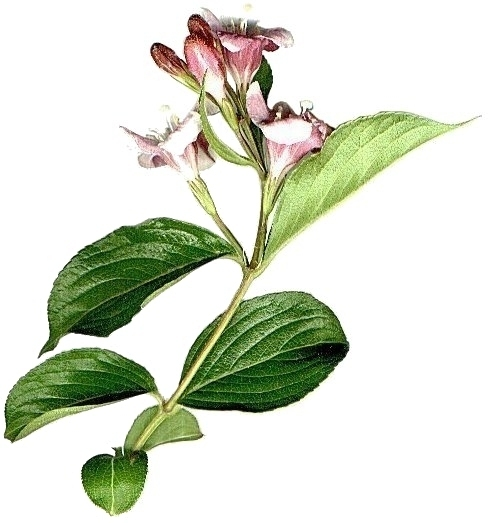
- The bush violet flowering

Scientific classification
- Kingdom: Plantae
- Clade: Embryophytes
- Clade: Tracheophytes
- Clade: Spermatophytes
- Clade: Angiosperms
- Clade: Eudicots
- Clade: Asterids
- Order: Lamiales
- Family: Acanthaceae
- Genus: Barleria
- Species: B. obtusa

Binomial name
- Barleria obtusa Nees (1841)

= Barleria obtusa =

Bush violet

Species of flowering plant

Barleria obtusa, the bush violet, is a species of flowering plant in the family Acanthaceae. It occurs naturally along forest margins in the summer rainfall region of South Africa (Free State, KwaZulu-Natal, and the Northern Provinces) and in Mozambique. It is widely cultivated as a decorative garden shrub.

== Uses ==
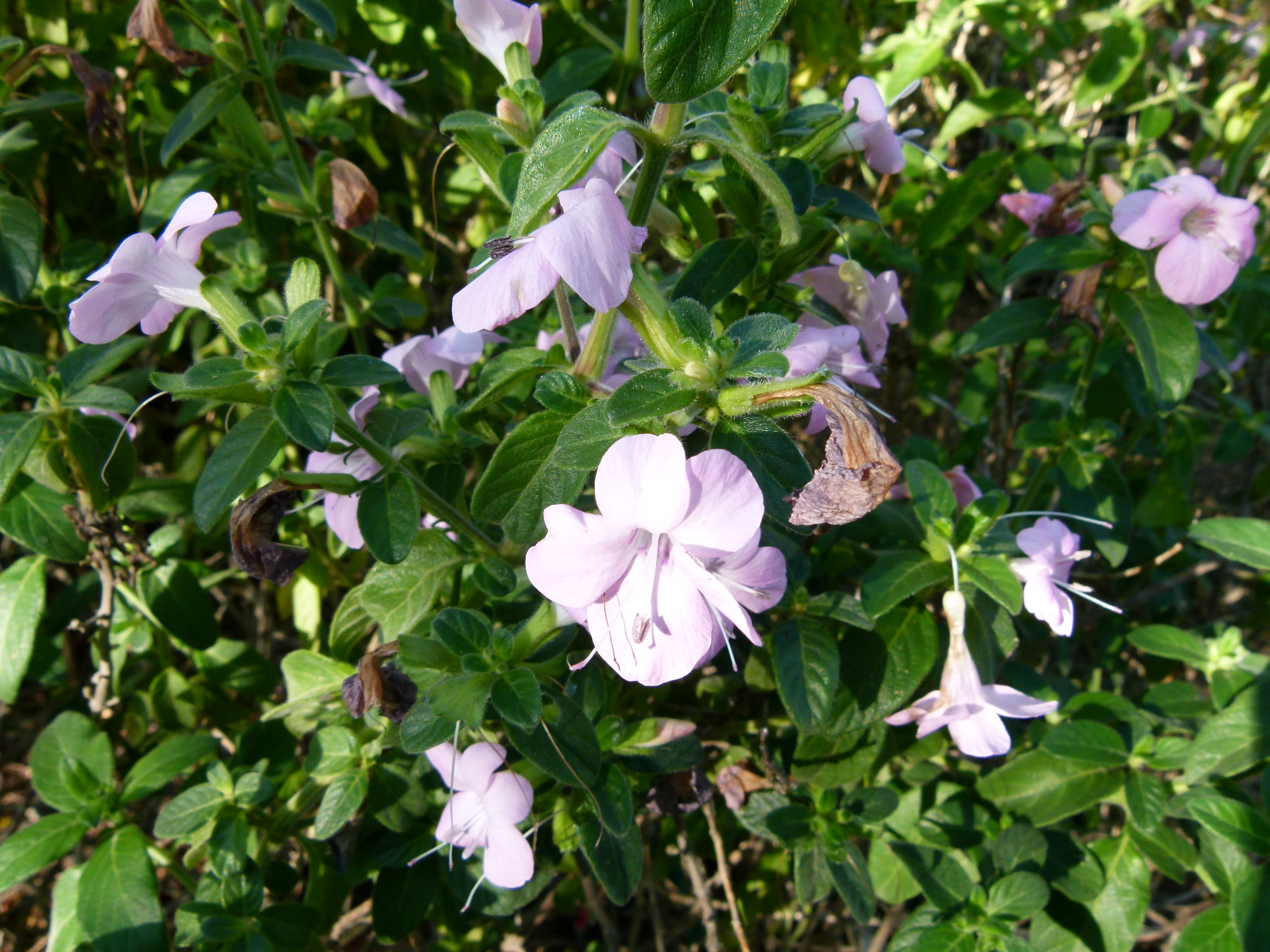
Barberio obtusa in the Botanic Garden, Barcelona

In tropical Africa, the leaves are cooked as a vegetable, and the plant is used medicinally.
