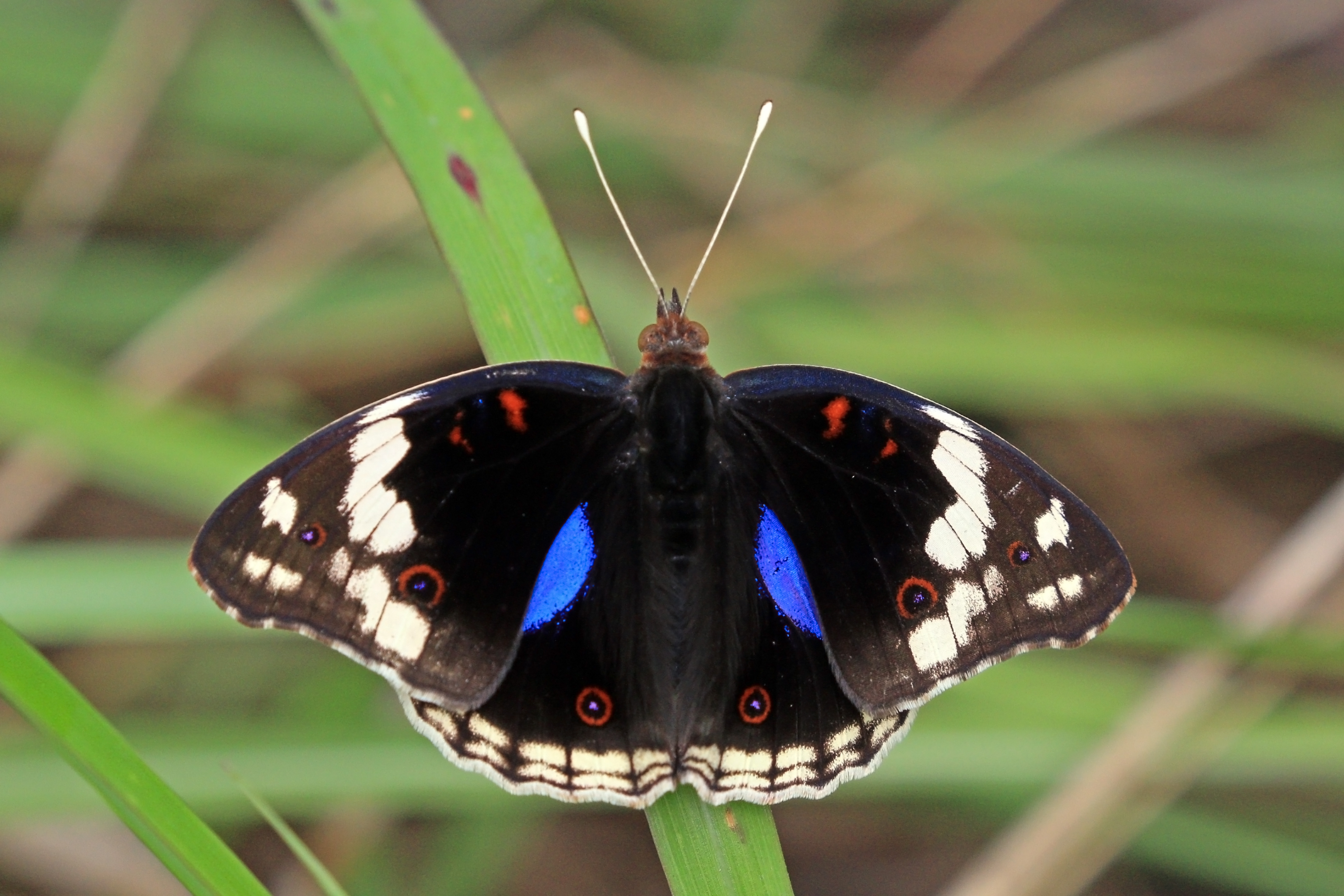
- J. o. oenone, Queen Elizabeth National Park, Uganda

Scientific classification
- Kingdom: Animalia
- Phylum: Arthropoda
- Clade: Pancrustacea
- Class: Insecta
- Order: Lepidoptera
- Family: Nymphalidae
- Genus: Junonia
- Species: J. oenone

Binomial name
- Junonia oenone (Linnaeus, 1758)

Synonyms
- Papilio oenone Linnaeus, 1758; Papilio clelia Cramer, [1775]; Vanessa epiclelia Boisduval, 1833; Junonia clelia(Cramer, [1775]); Precis clelia ab. subepiclelia Strand, 1911; Precis clelia ab. triocellata Strand, 1911; Precis clelia ab. vosseleriana Strand, 1911; Precis clelia ab. viridata Strand, 1911; Precis clelia ab. subvirilis Strand, 1912; Precis clelia ab. bipupillata Strand, 1912; Precis clelia ab. posterior Strand, 1912; Precis clelia ab. subtriocellata Strand, 1912; Precis clelia ab. subbipupillata Strand, 1912; Precis clelia ab. virilis Strand, 1912; Precis clelia ab. caeruleffulgiens Heslop, 1962

= Junonia oenone =

Species of butterfly

Junonia oenone, the blue pansy or dark blue pansy, is a Nymphalid butterfly native to Africa. "Blue pansy" is also used in India to describe Junonia orithya.

== Subspecies ==
- Junonia oenone oenone from continental Africa.
- Junonia oenone epiclelia Boisduval, 1833 from Madagascar, Aldabra, Astove, Assumption and Cosmoledo Island.

Torben Larsen developed a species numbering system for his 2005 publication Butterflies of West Africa. The nominate subspecies is #814. The 'Larsen' numbers have since been used with permission in A Sharp Eye on Butterflies of Ghana.

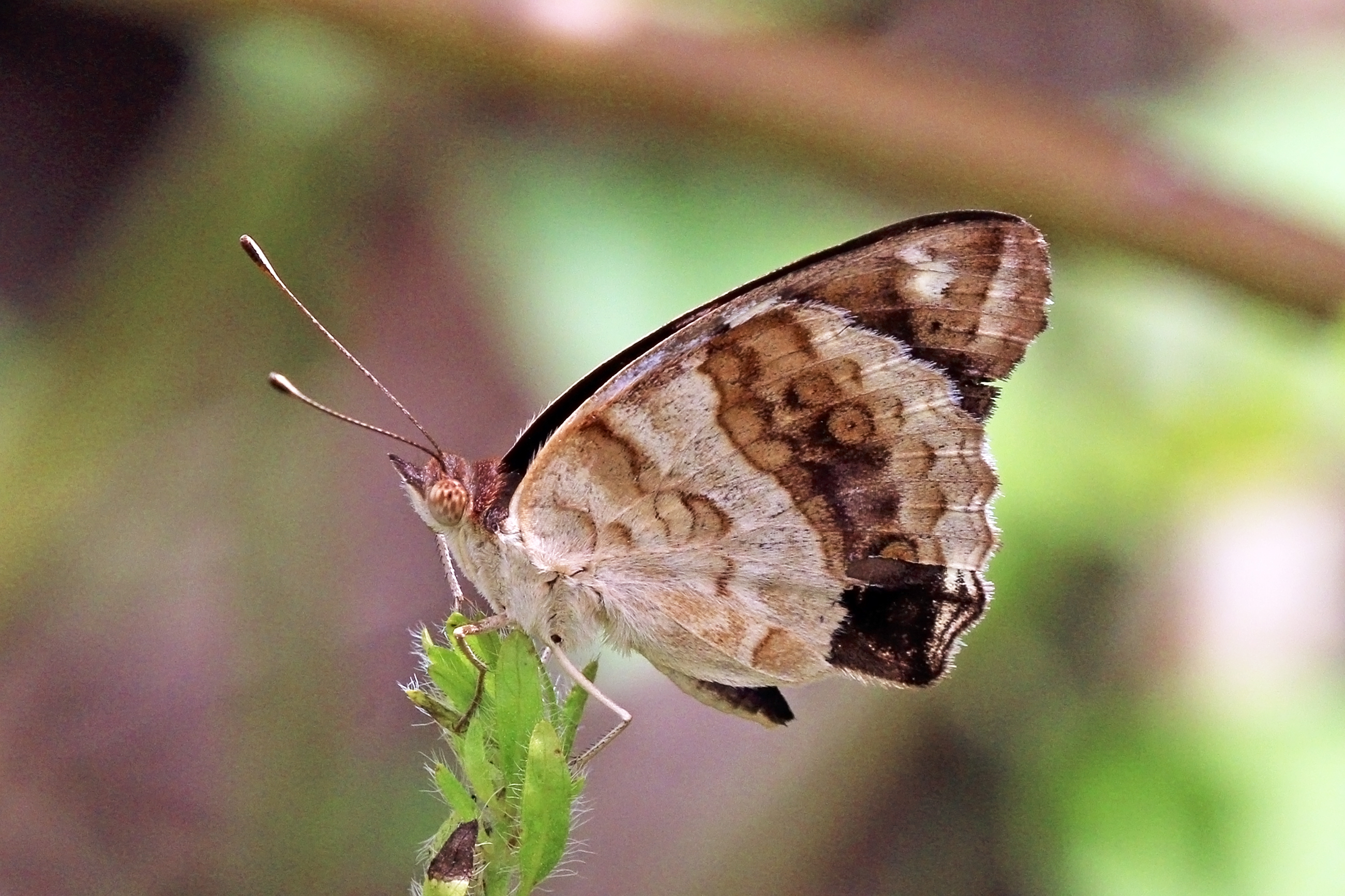
J. o. oenone, Uganda

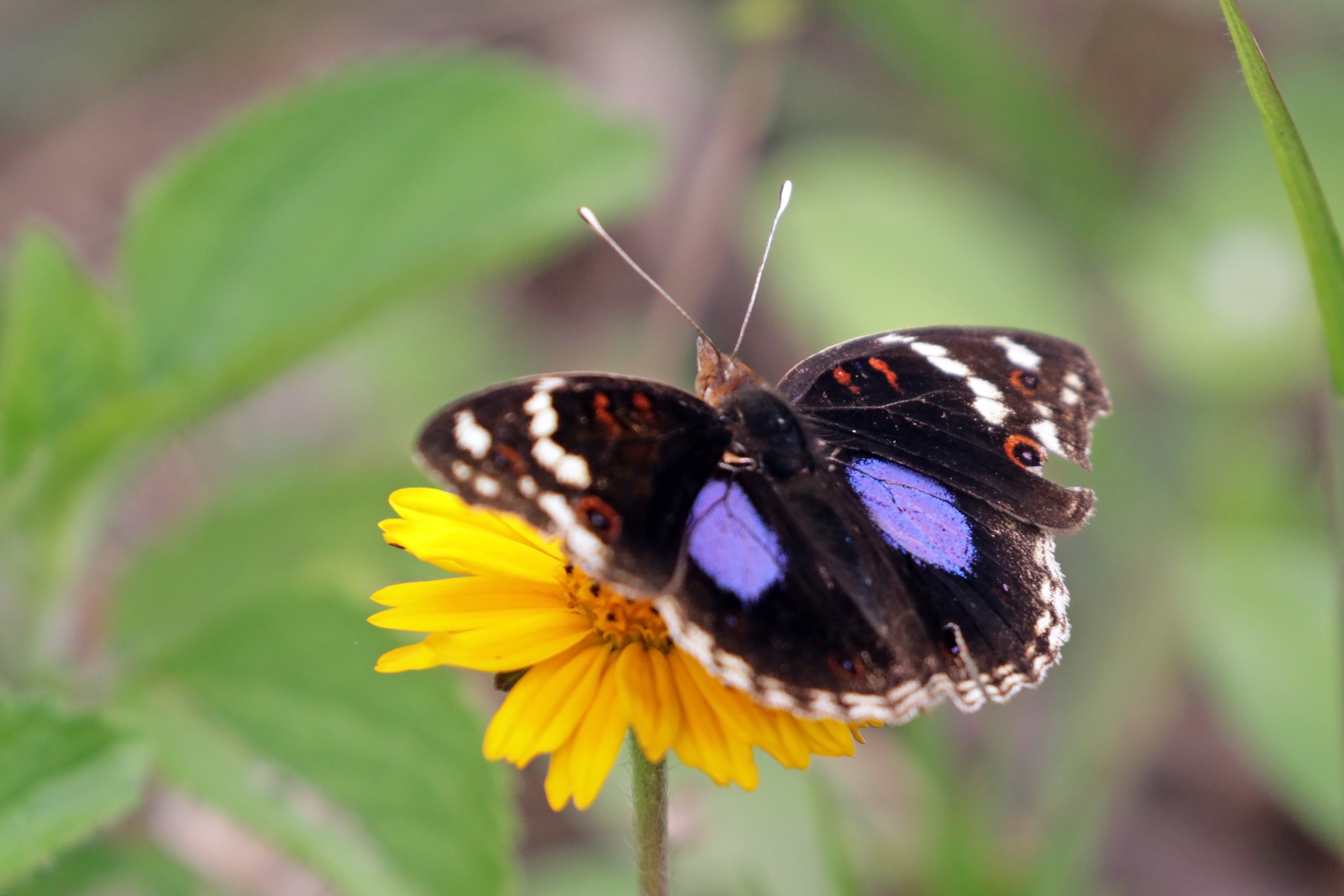
J. o. epiclelia male, Madagascar

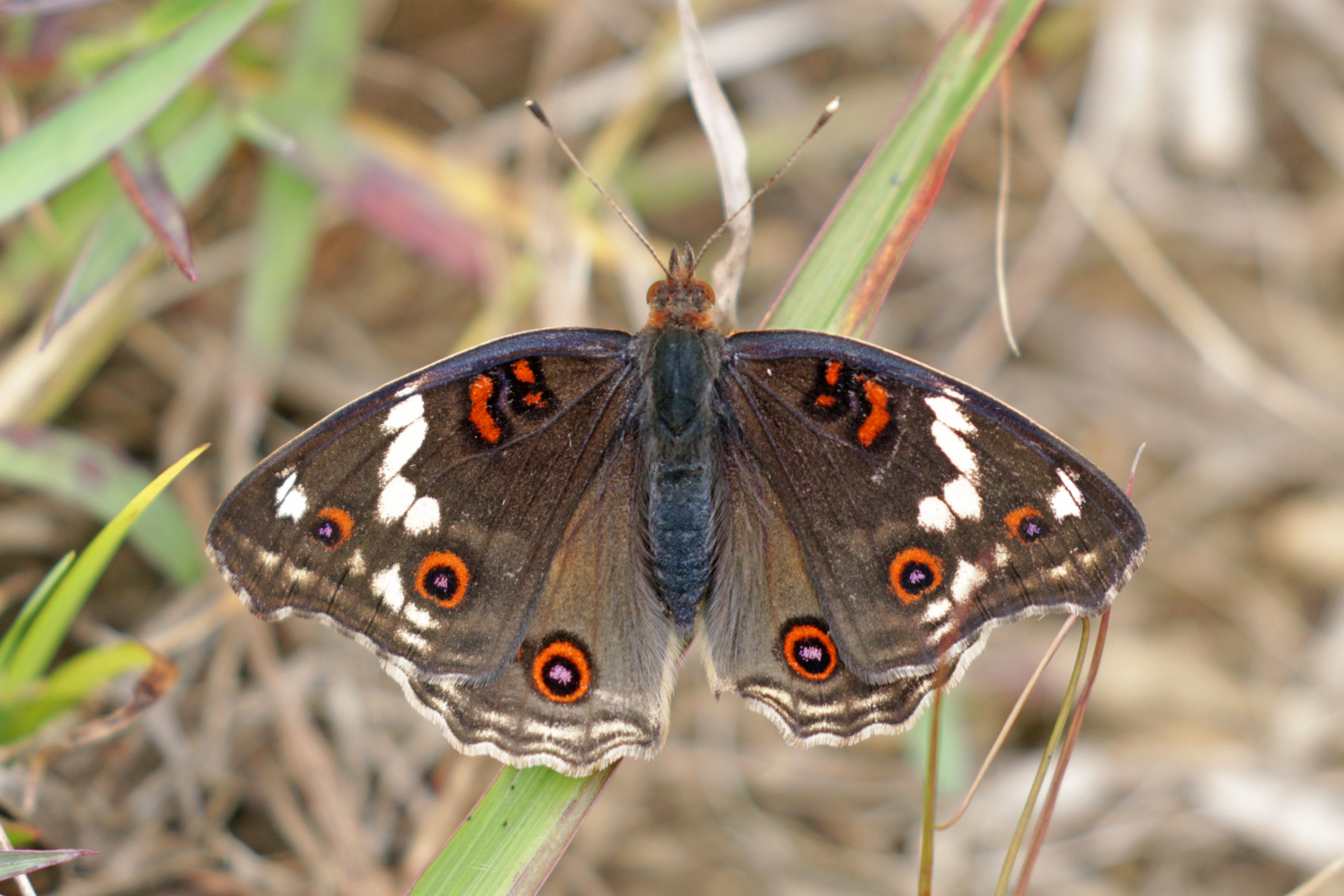
J. o. epiclelia female, Madagascar

== Description ==
The wingspan is 40–52 mm. The upper surface of the forewings is black with white markings towards the apex. The upper surface of the hindwings is black with white markings on the outer edge, and a characteristic large metallic-blue spot. This blue spot is smaller and more a dull purple in females. The underside of the forewings is brown with white markings corresponding to those on the upper surface. The under surface of the hindwings is almost uniform brown.

== Larval food plants ==
The larvae feed on Adhatoda densiflora, Mackaya bella, Justicia natalensis and Asystasia (A. gangetica), Isoglossa, Pualowilhelmia and Ruella species.
