= T. Venkatapathi Reddiar =

Indian horticulturist and florist

- Born: 29 March 1946 (age 80); Koodapakkam, Puduchery, India
- Occupation: Horticulturist
- Awards: 1.Padma Shri 2.Vezhan Vittighar Award 3.Limca Book of Records
- Website: http://lntc72.com/

T. Venkatapathi Reddiar is an Indian horticulturist and florist, credited with the development of over 100 varieties of crossandra flowers and casuarinas. He was honored by the Government of India, in 2012, with the fourth highest Indian civilian award of Padma Shri.

== Biography ==
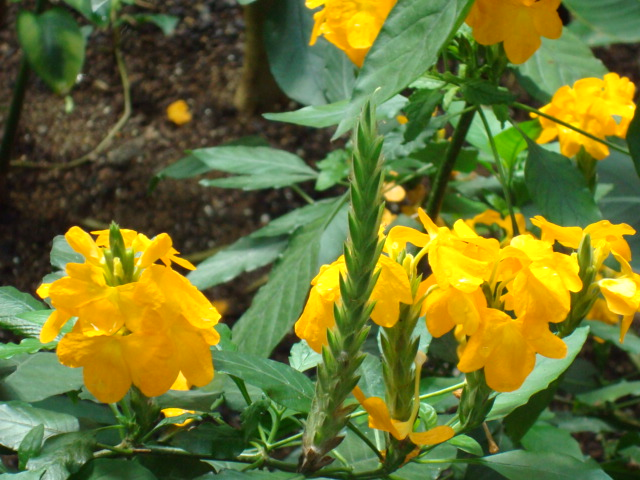
Crossandra infundibuliformis

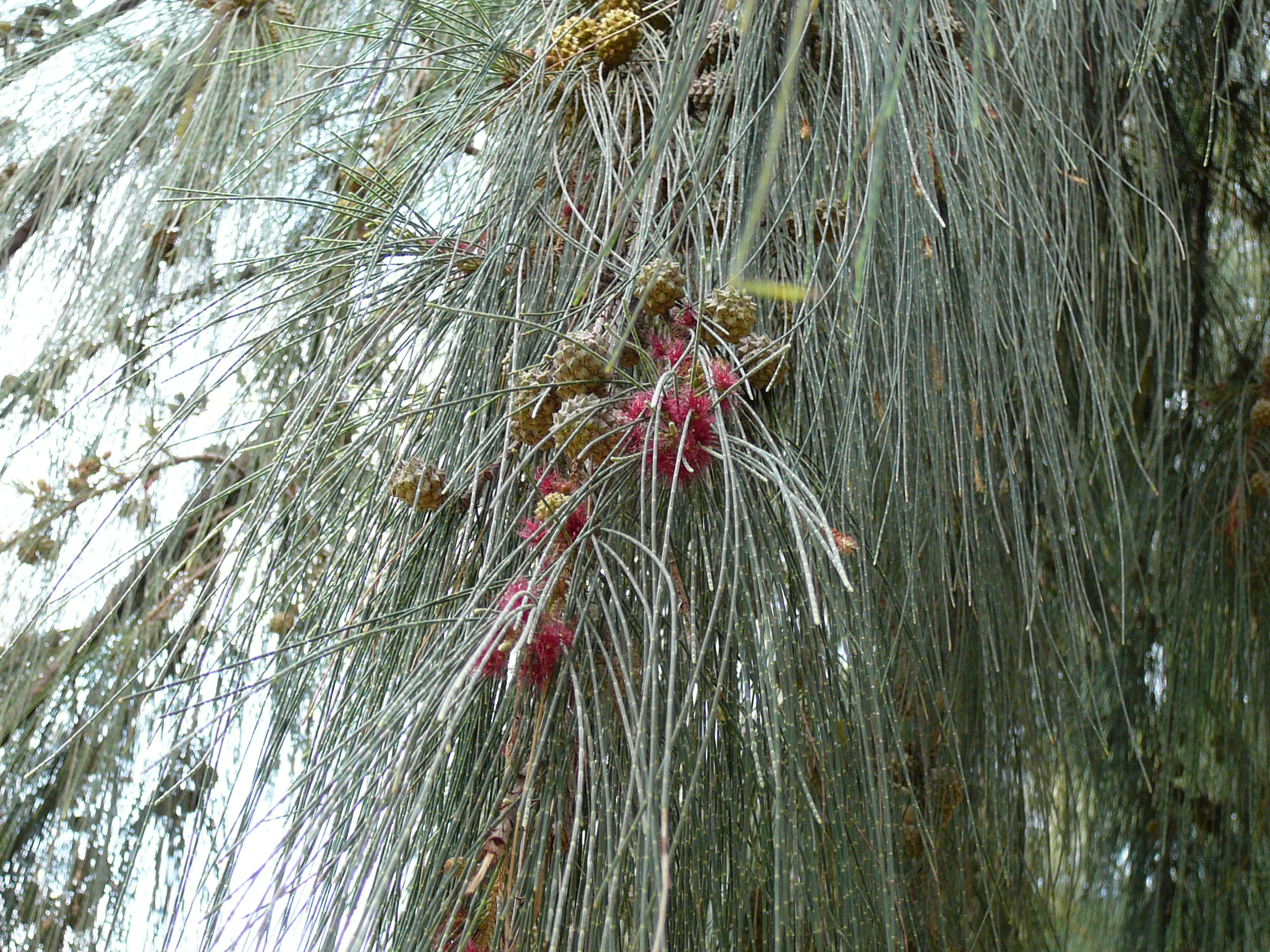
Casuarina equisetifolia 0004

Venkatapathi Reddiar was born on 29 March 1946 in Koodapakkam village of the Indian Union Territory of Puducherry. His schooling was broken while he was in grade 4 as he had to assist his family in farming but, taking a fascination for horticulture, he learnt the science through self-education. He obtained translated versions of scientific journals for his studies and attempted reportedly innovative practices at Lakshminarayana Crossandra Innovative Centre, a laboratory and research centre founded by him in 1972. Initially he worked on micropropagation of different varieties of flower plants but soon started deploying tissue culture techniques at the laboratory he had set up.

Reddiar is credited with the standardization of the technique of nodal stem cuttings in mist chamber. He is reported to have developed over 100 varieties of plants such as Crossandra and disease resistant Casuarina. One of the crossandra varieties he has developed has been christened Abdul Kalam Crossandra, after the erstwhile President of India. Another variety of casuarina developed by him is dedicated to the incumbent Chief Minister of Puducherry, N. Rangaswamy and is known by name, Rangaswamy Casuarina. He is reported to have devised farming techniques for Delhi Crossandra which yields 20 kg of flowers per acre per day. He is also credited with the development of 30 high yielding mutant varieties of Crossandra using gamma radiation, with assistance from the Indira Gandhi Centre for Atomic Research, Kalpakkam.

Reddiar, whose hybrid varieties have been planted in the Mughal Gardens of the Rashtrapati Bhavan, lives in Koodapakkam in Puducherry.

== Awards and recognitions ==
Venkatapathi Reddiar, holder several patents, was honored by the International Tamil University, Maryland, USA with the degree of Doctor of Letters (Honoris Causa) in 2011. The same year, in 2011, he received the Vezhan Vittighar award from Tractors and Farm Equipment Limited (TAFE). He also features in the Limca Book of Records, an Indian repository of records and achievements, for his innovations. Reddiar, who has been invited by the President of India for a lunch with him at the Rashtrapati Bhavan, was awarded the civilian honour of Padma Shri by the Government of India in 2012, making him the first person from Puducherry to receive the award.
