= Asteranthe lutea =

Conservation status
- Endangered (IUCN 3.1)

Scientific classification
- Kingdom: Plantae
- Clade: Tracheophytes
- Clade: Angiosperms
- Clade: Magnoliids
- Order: Magnoliales
- Family: Annonaceae
- Genus: Asteranthe
- Species: A. lutea

Binomial name
- Asteranthe lutea Vollesen

Species of plant

Asteranthe lutea is a species of plant in the genus Asteranthe. It is native to Tanzania. Kaj Borge Vollesen, the botanist who first formally described the species in 1980, named it after its yellow (luteus in Latin) petals.

== Description ==
It is a bush reaching 4 meters in height. Its elliptical leaves are 7–18.5 by 2.7-9 centimeters. The bases of the leaves are rounded or notched at the point of attachment to the petioles. The tips of the leaves come to a short tapered tip. The leaves have 10-15 pairs of secondary veins emanating from their midribs. Its petioles are 3-5 millimeters long and covered in dense woolly hairs. Its solitary, fragrant flowers are on 2-8 millimeter long pedicels that occur at extra-axillary or terminal positions. Its pedicels are covered in dense white woolly hairs and have an oval, green bracteole that is 6–8 by 5-7 millimeters. The bracteoles have a notched base and come to point at their tip. Its green, oval sepals are 1-1.5 by 0.8-1.2 centimeters and come to a tapering point at their tips. The sepals have white silky hairs at their base. Its mature, fleshy petals are yellow with streaks of red highlights at their base. The base of the petals form a 10 millimeter long tube, with free triangular lobes that are 2-2.4 by 1.2-1.5 millimeters and come to a tapering point at their tip. The outer surface of the petals is covered in dense, silky white hairs. The inner surface of the petals is covered in woolly hairs that are more rigid at the petal's apex. Its flowers have 250-300 yellow stamens that are 3 millimeters long with longitudinal grooves that separate the lobes of their anthers. The tissue connecting the lobes of the anthers is over-grown to form a convex cap covered in fine hairs. Its flowers have 3-10 carpels that are 2.5 millimeters long and covered in dense woolly hairs. Its rectangular to cylindrical styles are 1 millimeter long with a wide tip that is folded in to form a groove. The styles are covered in silky hairs.

=== Reproductive biology ===
The pollen of A. lutea is shed as permanent tetrads.

=== Habitat and distribution ===
It has been observed growing in dense forests near rivers.

=== Uses ===
Extracts from its root and stem bark has been reported to contain bioactive molecules with larvicidal properties in tests with Anopheles gambiae larva.
