= Asteranthe =

Scientific classification
- Kingdom: Plantae
- Clade: Embryophytes
- Clade: Tracheophytes
- Clade: Spermatophytes
- Clade: Angiosperms
- Clade: Magnoliids
- Order: Magnoliales
- Family: Annonaceae
- Subfamily: Annonoideae
- Tribe: Monodoreae
- Genus: Asteranthe; Engl. & Diels (1901)

Synonyms
- Asteranthopsis Kuntze (1903), nom. illeg.

Genus of flowering plants

Asteranthe is a genus of plants in the family Annonaceae. It comprises two species distributed in Kenya and Tanzania.

== Description ==
Asteranthe species are shrubs or small trees with hermaphroditic flowers.

== Species ==
The following species are accepted in this genus:

- Asteranthe asterias (S. Moore) Engl. & Diels
- Asteranthe lutea Vollesen
