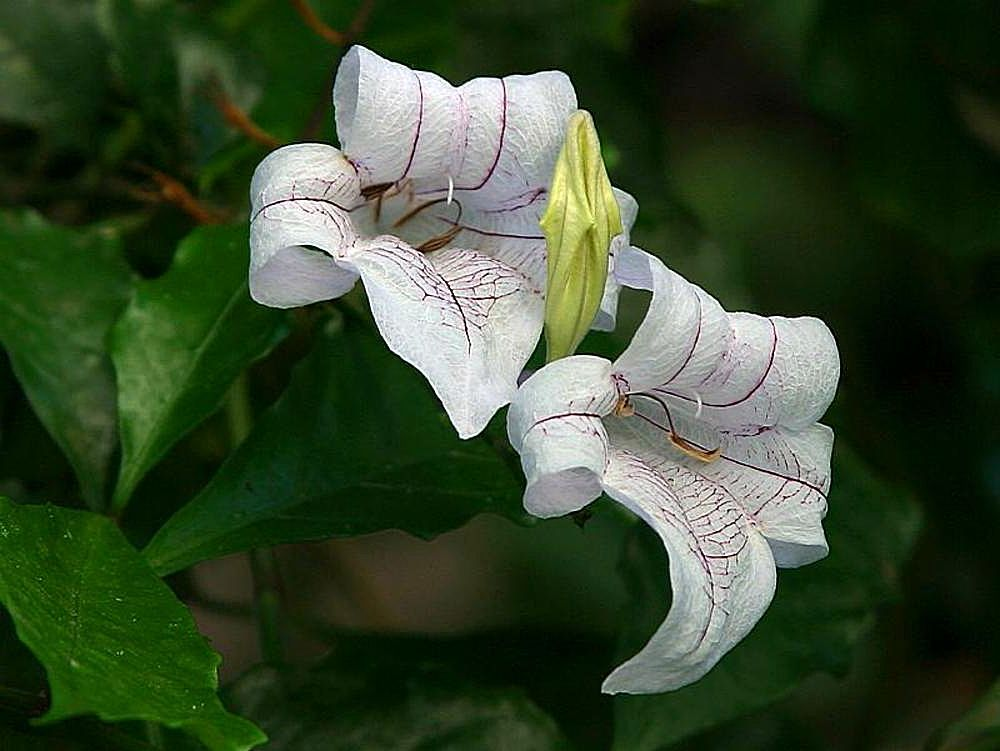
- Mackaya bella

Scientific classification
- Kingdom: Plantae
- Clade: Embryophytes
- Clade: Tracheophytes
- Clade: Angiosperms
- Clade: Eudicots
- Clade: Asterids
- Order: Lamiales
- Family: Acanthaceae
- Subfamily: Acanthoideae
- Tribe: Justicieae
- Genus: Mackaya; Harv. (1859), nom. cons.

Species
- 5, see text

= Mackaya =

Genus of flowering plants

Mackaya is a genus of flowering plants in the family Acanthaceae, disjunctly distributed in South Africa and the eastern Himalayas, Southeast Asia, and China. It is sister to Asystasia.

== Species ==
Currently accepted species include:

- Mackaya atroviridis (T.Anderson) Das
- Mackaya bella Harv.
- Mackaya indica (Nees) Ensermu
- Mackaya macrocarpa (Nees) Das
- Mackaya neesiana (Wall.) Das

== Cultivation ==
Some species are cultivated as ornamental plants. Mackaya bella from South Africa, a small evergreen shrub with purple-veined white flowers, has received the Royal Horticultural Society's Award of Garden Merit. It is only hardy down to 10 °C (50 °F), so in temperate zones requires protection during the winter months.
