= B. edulis =

B. edulis may refer to:

- Bambusa edulis, a synonym for Phyllostachys edulis, a bamboo species
- Barringtonia edulis, a fruit tree species from the southwest Pacific
- Blepharis edulis, a plant species
- Boletus edulis, the cep, a mushroom species
- Bomarea edulis, common name salsilla, a flowering plant species
- Brahea edulis, the Guadalupe palm or palma de Guadalupe, a palm species native and almost endemic to Guadalupe Island, Mexico

== See also ==
- Edulis (disambiguation)
