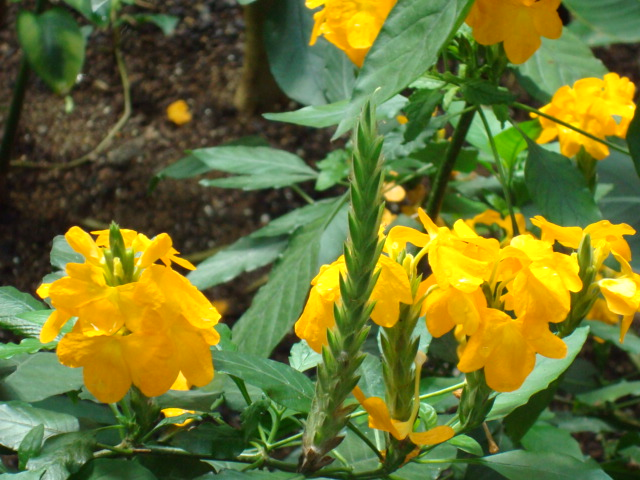
- Crossandra infundibuliformis

Scientific classification
- Kingdom: Plantae
- Clade: Tracheophytes
- Clade: Angiosperms
- Clade: Eudicots
- Clade: Asterids
- Order: Lamiales
- Family: Acanthaceae
- Subfamily: Acanthoideae
- Tribe: Acantheae
- Genus: Crossandra; Salisb. (1805)

Species
- See text

Synonyms
- Harrachia J.Jacq. (1812); Pleuroblepharis Baill. (1890); Polythrix Nees (1847); Strobilacanthus Griseb. (1858)

= Crossandra =

Genus of flowering plants

Crossandra is a genus of plants in the family Acanthaceae, comprising 54 species that occur in Africa, Madagascar, Arabia and the Indian subcontinent. Some species, especially Crossandra infundibuliformis, are cultivated for their brightly colored flowers.

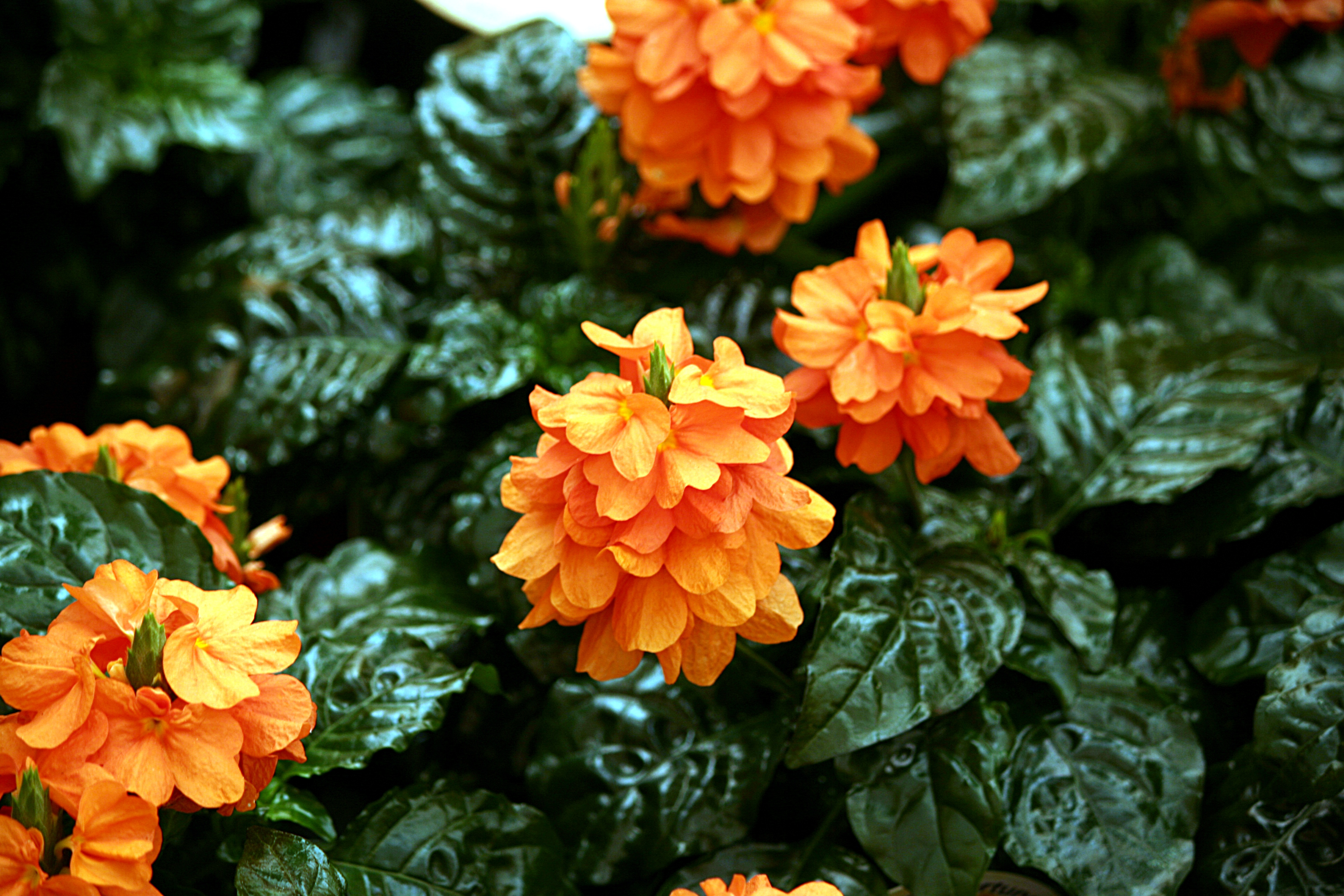
Crossandra infundibuliformis

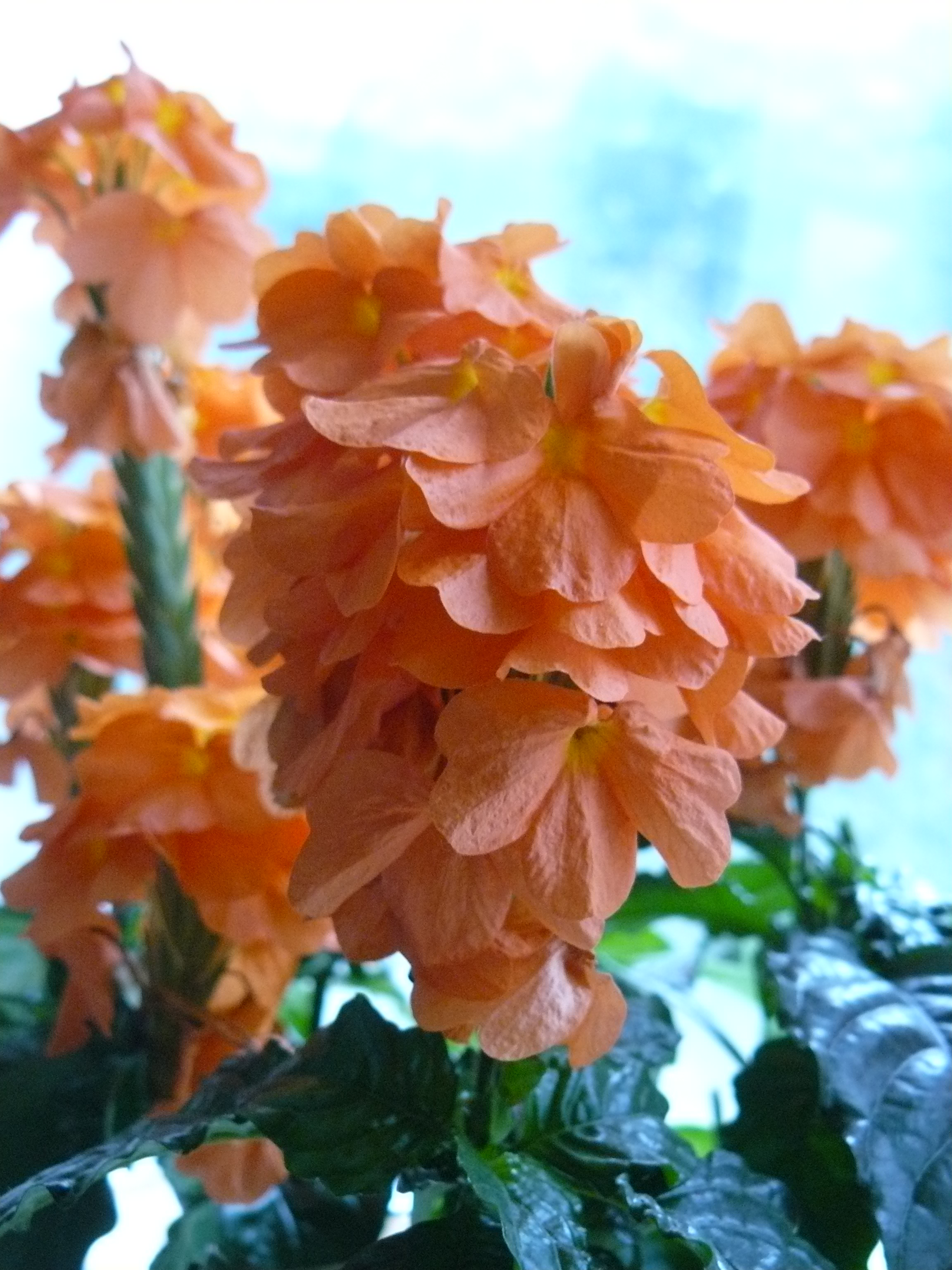
A Photo of Crossandra 'Fortuna'

== Species ==
Species in the genus include:

- Crossandra acutiloba Vollesen
- Crossandra albolineata Benoist
- Crossandra angolensis S.Moore
- Crossandra arenicola Vollesen
- Crossandra armandii Benoist
- Crossandra baccarinii Fiori
- Crossandra benoistii Vollesen
- Crossandra cephalostachya Mildbr.
- Crossandra cinnabarina Vollesen
- Crossandra cloiselii S.Moore
- Crossandra douillotii Benoist
- Crossandra flava Hook.
- Crossandra flavicaulis Vollesen
- Crossandra friesiorum Mildbr.
- Crossandra fruticulosa Lindau
- Crossandra grandidieri (Baill.) Benoist
- Crossandra greenstockii S.Moore
- Crossandra horrida Vollesen
- Crossandra humbertii Benoist
- Crossandra infundibuliformis (L.) Nees
- Crossandra isaloensis Vollesen
- Crossandra johanninae Fiori
- Crossandra leikipiensis Schweinf.
- Crossandra leucodonta Vollesen
- Crossandra longehirsuta Vollesen
- Crossandra longipes S.Moore
- Crossandra longispica Benoist
- Crossandra massaica Mildbr.
- Crossandra mucronata Lindau
- Crossandra multidentata Vollesen
- Crossandra nilotica Oliv.
- Crossandra nobilis Benoist
- Crossandra obanensis Heine
- Crossandra pilosa (Benoist) Vollesen
- Crossandra pinguior S.Moore
- Crossandra poissonii Benoist
- Crossandra praecox Vollesen
- Crossandra primuloides Lindau
- Crossandra puberula Klotzsch
- Crossandra pungens Lindau
- Crossandra pyrophila Vollesen
- Crossandra quadridentata Benoist
- Crossandra raripila Benoist
- Crossandra rupestris Benoist
- Crossandra spinescens Dunkley
- Crossandra spinosa Beck
- Crossandra stenandrium (Nees) Lindau
- Crossandra stenostachya (Lindau) C.B.Clarke
- Crossandra strobilifera (Lam.) Benoist
- Crossandra subacaulis C.B.Clarke
- Crossandra sulphurea G.Taylor
- Crossandra tridentata Lindau
- Crossandra tsingyensis Vollesen
- Crossandra vestita Benoist
