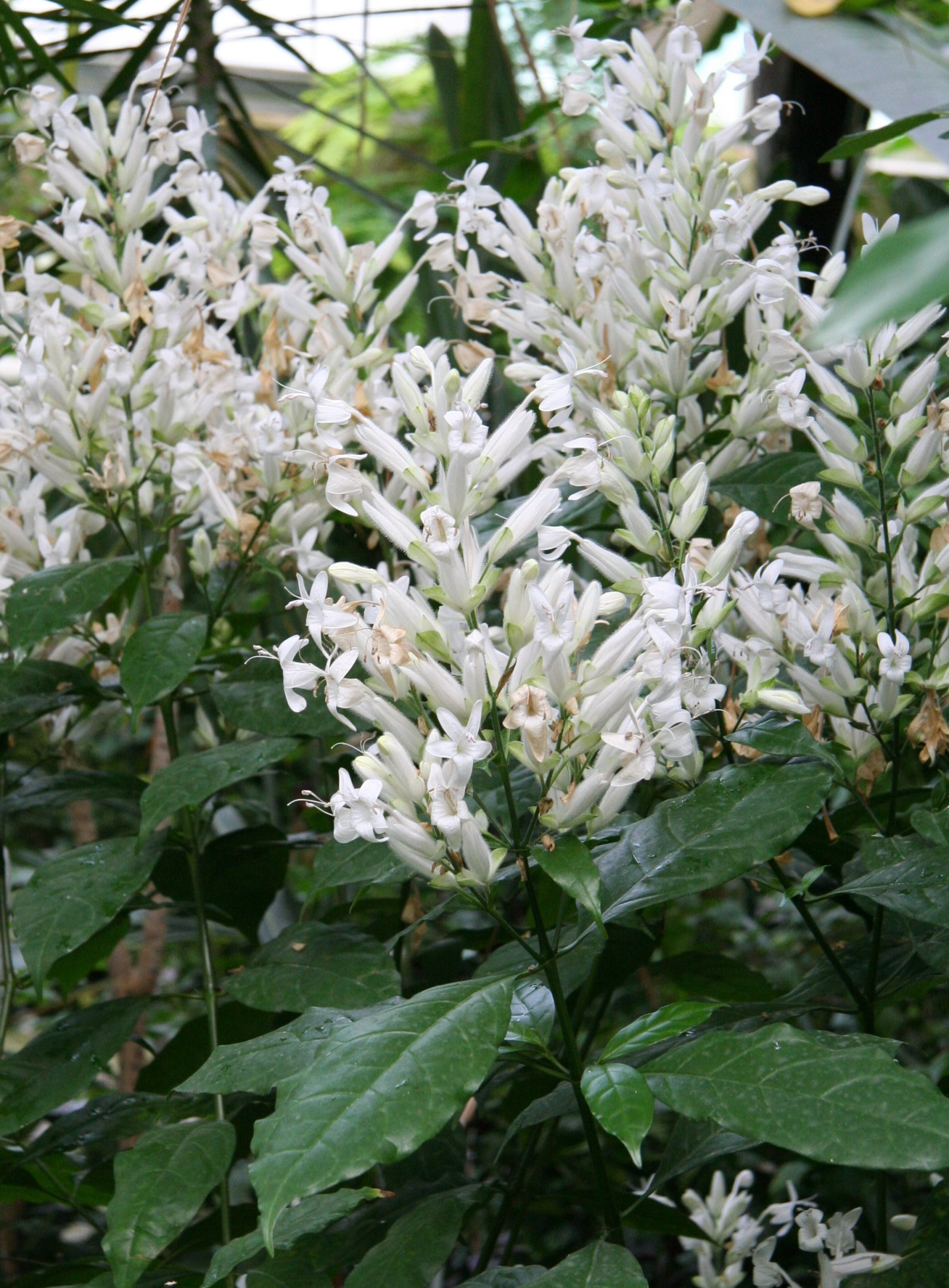
- Whitfieldia elongata

Scientific classification
- Kingdom: Plantae
- Clade: Tracheophytes
- Clade: Angiosperms
- Clade: Eudicots
- Clade: Asterids
- Order: Lamiales
- Family: Acanthaceae
- Subfamily: Acanthoideae
- Tribe: Whitfieldieae
- Genus: Whitfieldia; Hook. (1845)

Synonyms
- Leiophaca Lindau (1911); Pounguia Benoist (1938 publ. 1939); Stylarthropus Baill. (1890)

= Whitfieldia =

Genus of flowering plants

Whitfieldia is a genus of flowering plants in the family Acanthaceae. It includes 13 species of erect or scrambling shrubs native to tropical Africa. The greatest species diversity is in the Guineo-Congolian rainforests of western and central Africa.

== Species ==
13 species are accepted:

- Whitfieldia brazzae (Baill.) C.B.Clarke
- Whitfieldia colorata C.B.Clarke ex Stapf
- Whitfieldia elongata (P.Beauv.) De Wild. & T.Durand
- Whitfieldia lateritia Hook.
- Whitfieldia latiflos C.B.Clarke
- Whitfieldia laurentii (Lindau) C.B.Clarke
- Whitfieldia liebrechtsiana De Wild. & T.Durand
- Whitfieldia orientalis Vollesen
- Whitfieldia preussii (Lindau) C.B.Clarke
- Whitfieldia purpurata (Benoist) Heine
- Whitfieldia rutilans Heine
- Whitfieldia stuhlmannii (Lindau) C.B.Clarke
- Whitfieldia thollonii (Baill.) Benoist
