= Neriga =

Coordinates: 12°55′N 77°47′E

- village
- Interactive map of Neriga
- Country: India
- State: Karnataka
- District: Bangalore
- Talukas: Anekal

Area
  - Total: 400 km^{2} (150 sq mi)
- Elevation: 1,426 m (4,678 ft)

Population (2001)
  - Total: 1,345
  - Density: 3.4/km^{2} (8.7/sq mi)

Languages
  - Official: Kannada
- Time zone: UTC+5:30 (IST)

Neriga is a village in the Anekal taluk of Bangalore Urban district in the Indian state of Karnataka. It is located near Varthuru.

== Geography ==
It is located 24 kilometers to Bangalore Central, 8 kilometers from Whitefield. The village is located at Varthuru to Sarjapura way or Marathahalli to Malur Road. The agricultural production is made possible by the nearby rain water, includes Paddy fields, Raagi, Sericulture, Rose, Kanakambara, Vegetables and other crops throughout the year. The village is very famous for Nilagiri plantations and milk. Five brick industries situated in the village

== Education ==
The International School Bangalore (TISB), Inventure Academy and Green wood high international schools are situated here. The villagers have a literacy level of 70%.

Nerige is well culture bound village the folk culture is still alive. The youth have formed teams for nataka ranga, dollu kunita, and other arts.

Well bonded people with different sub-religions of Hindu

== Finance ==
Dena Bank work started from 01.01.2014 at behind Panchayati office. the branch Name is Neriga, IFS Code BKDN0611611. The average yearly income of a family living in Neriga village is 15,000 rupees.

== Communication & Network ==
BSNL Telephone Exchange code NRA, STD Code +9180, BSNL Landline series starts from 27851 XXX, Post Sub-Office / Zip code 562125, Available mobile networks : Airtel 4G, Vodafone, BSNL & TATA group networks.

== History ==
There is a well known old lord (Lord Shiva) named Avimuktheshwara shiva and jeevasamadhi at the east Neriga also called as Avimukthapura.

Hoysala era statues (veera kallu, naga kallu) can be seen in the village and a somany centuries old Grāmadevatā (Maramma) statue is also present and Basaveshwara Nandi Temple, Poojamma devi temple, DhavaLamma temple, 10 temples of muneshwara, navagraha, ashwattha katte. Neeladapura [south west of Neriga 0.7 km distance], Kothuru [east side of Neriga 0.9 km distance], and chikkakaLapura [south side of Neriga 1.3 km distance] these three villages and Nerige Port are destroyed as on may be 16th or 17th centuries.

== Transportation ==
The village can be reached by BMTC bus from K.R. Market, Kempegowda Bus stand (Majestic), Shivajinagara, bus number series 323, D, E, F, J, L.

Carmelaram Railway Station 7 km, Bellandur Road Railway Station 7 km and Whitefield Railway Station 12 km.
