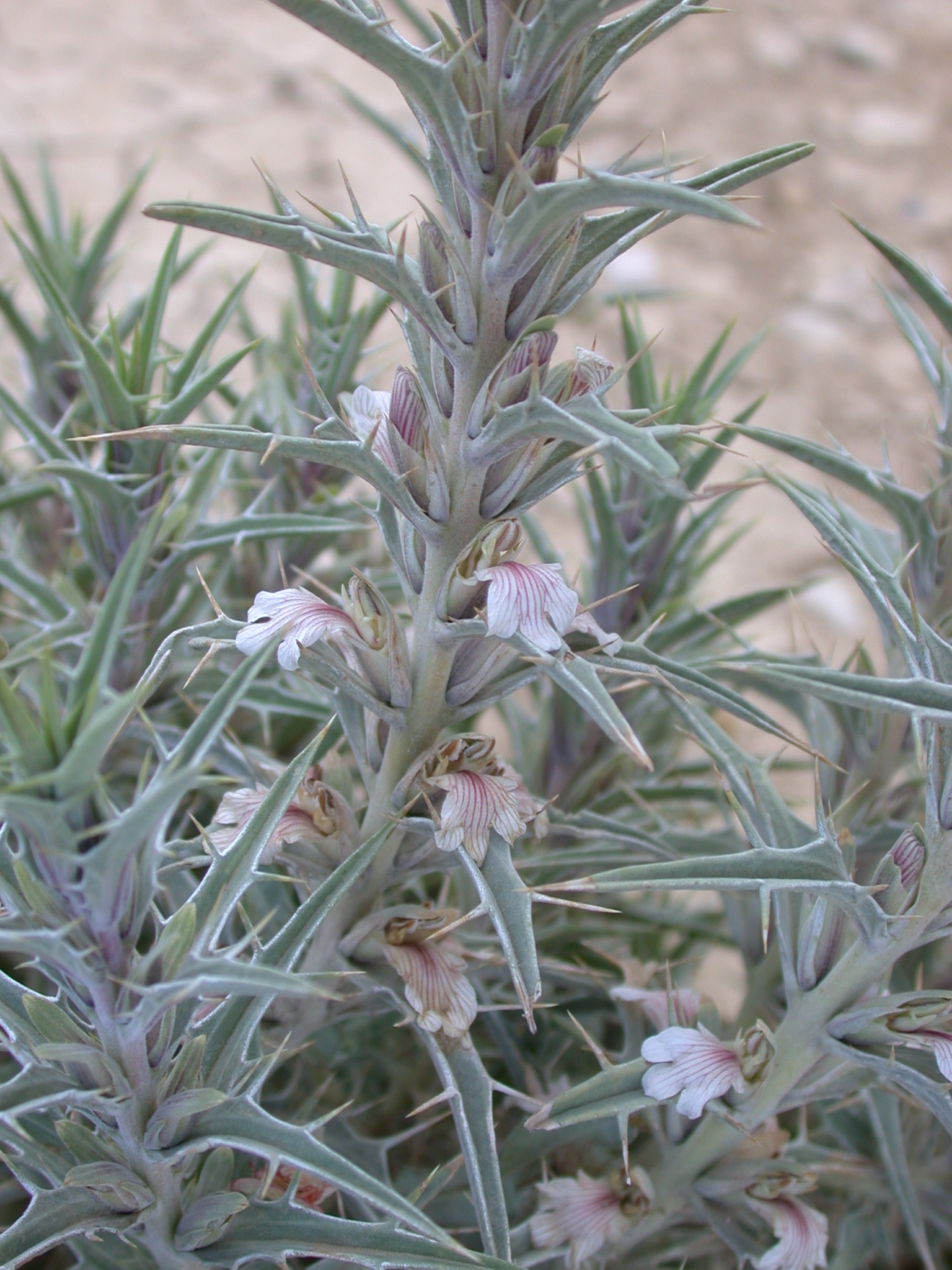

Scientific classification
- Kingdom: Plantae
- Clade: Tracheophytes
- Clade: Angiosperms
- Clade: Eudicots
- Clade: Asterids
- Order: Lamiales
- Family: Acanthaceae
- Subfamily: Acanthoideae
- Tribe: Acantheae
- Genus: Blepharis; Juss. (1789)

Synonyms
- Acanthodium Delile (1813); Blepharacanthus Nees (1836); Trichacanthus Zoll. & Moritzi (1845)

= Blepharis =

Species of plant

Blepharis is a genus of plant in family Acanthaceae. It contains around 128 species found in seasonally dry to arid habitats from Africa through Arabia to Southeast Asia. In section Acanthodium, there are 13–15 species that use the C_{4} carbon fixation pathway. Phylogenetic analysis suggests that this pathway evolved up to three times independently in the genus over the last five million years.

The genus is named after the Greek word βλεφαρίς (Modern Greek βλεφαρίδα), which means eyelash. Missouri Botanical Garden

== Species ==
128 species are accepted.

- Blepharis acanthodioides Klotzsch
- Blepharis acuminata Oberm.
- Blepharis aequisepala Vollesen
- Blepharis affinis Lindau
- Blepharis angusta (Nees) T.Anderson
- Blepharis aspera Oberm.
- Blepharis asteracantha C.B.Clarke
- Blepharis attenuata Napper
- Blepharis bainesii S.Moore ex C.B.Clarke
- Blepharis boranensis Vollesen
- Blepharis breyeri Oberm.
- Blepharis buchneri Lindau
- Blepharis burundiensis Vollesen
- Blepharis calcitrapa Benoistz
- Blepharis capensis (L.f.) Pers.
- Blepharis chrysotricha Lindau
- Blepharis ciliaris (L.) B.L.Burtt
- Blepharis crinita Juss.
- Blepharis cuanzensis Welw. ex S.Moore
- Blepharis cuspidata Lindau
- Blepharis decussata S.Moore
- Blepharis dhofarensis A.G.Mill.
- Blepharis dilatata C.B.Clarke
- Blepharis diplodonta Vollesen
- Blepharis diversispina (Nees) C.B.Clarke
- Blepharis drummondii Vollesen
- Blepharis dunensis Vollesen
- Blepharis duvigneaudii Vollesen
- Blepharis edulis (Forssk.) Pers.
- Blepharis eilensis Baldesi & Vollesen
- Blepharis espinosa Phillips
- Blepharis exigua (Zoll. & Moritzi) Valeton ex Backer
- Blepharis fenestralis Vollesen
- Blepharis ferox P.G.Mey.
- Blepharis flava Vollesen
- Blepharis fleckii P.G.Mey.
- Blepharis forgiarinii J.-P.Lebrun & Stork
- Blepharis furcata (L.f.) Pers.
- Blepharis gazensis Vollesen
- Blepharis gigantea Oberm.
- Blepharis glinus Fiori
- Blepharis glomerans Benoist
- Blepharis glumacea S.Moore
- Blepharis grandis C.B.Clarke
- Blepharis grossa (Nees) T.Anderson
- Blepharis gypsophila Thulin & Vollesen
- Blepharis hildebrandtii Lindau
- Blepharis hirtinervia (Nees) T.Anderson
- Blepharis huillensis Vollesen
- Blepharis ilicifolia Napper
- Blepharis ilicina Oberm.
- Blepharis inaequalis C.B.Clarke
- Blepharis inermis (Nees) C.B.Clarke
- Blepharis inflata Vollesen
- Blepharis innocua C.B.Clarke
- Blepharis inopinata Vollesen
- Blepharis integrifolia (L.f.) E.Mey. & Drège ex Schinz
- Blepharis involucrata Solms ex Schweinf.
- Blepharis itigiensis Vollesen
- Blepharis javanica Bremek.
- Blepharis katangensis De Wild.
- Blepharis kenyensis Vollesen
- Blepharis kuriensis Vierh.
- Blepharis laevifolia Vollesen
- Blepharis lawsonii G.S.Giri & R.N.Banerjee
- Blepharis leendertziae Oberm.
- Blepharis linariifolia Pers.
- Blepharis longifolia Lindau
- Blepharis longispica C.B.Clarke
- Blepharis macra (Nees) Vollesen
- Blepharis maculata Benoist
- Blepharis maderaspatensis (L.) B.Heyne ex Roth
- Blepharis marginata (Nees) C.B.Clarke
- Blepharis menocotyle Milne-Redh.
- Blepharis meyeri Vollesen
- Blepharis mitrata C.B.Clarke
- Blepharis montana Vollesen
- Blepharis natalensis Oberm.
- Blepharis noli-me-tangere S.Moore
- Blepharis obermeyerae Vollesen
- Blepharis obmitrata C.B.Clarke
- Blepharis obtusisepala Oberm.
- Blepharis ogadenensis Vollesen
- Blepharis panduriformis Lindau
- Blepharis paradoxa Fritsch
- Blepharis pascuorum S.Moore
- Blepharis petalidioides Vollesen
- Blepharis petraea Vollesen
- Blepharis pratensis S.Moore
- Blepharis procumbens (L.f.) Pers.
- Blepharis pruinosa Engl.
- Blepharis pungens Klotzsch
- Blepharis pusilla Vollesen
- Blepharis reekmansii Vollesen
- Blepharis refracta Mildbr.
- Blepharis richardsiae Vollesen
- Blepharis saudensis Masrahi & Basahi
- Blepharis scandens Vollesen
- Blepharis scindica Stocks ex T.Anderson
- Blepharis sericea Vollesen
- Blepharis serrulata (Nees) Picalho & Hiern
- Blepharis sinuata (Nees) C.B.Clarke
- Blepharis sol C.B.Clarke
- Blepharis somaliensis Vollesen
- Blepharis spiculifolia Balf.f.
- Blepharis spinescens Vollesen
- Blepharis spinifex Merxm.
- Blepharis spinipes Vollesen
- Blepharis squarrosa (Nees) T.Anderson
- Blepharis stainbankiae C.B.Clarke
- Blepharis stuhlmannii Lindau
- Blepharis subglabra Vollesen
- Blepharis subvolubilis C.B.Clarke
- Blepharis swaziensis Vollesen
- Blepharis tanae Napper
- Blepharis tanganyikensis (Napper) Vollesen
- Blepharis tanzaniensis Vollesen
- Blepharis tenuiramea S.Moore
- Blepharis tetrasticha Lindau
- Blepharis thulinii Vollesen
- Blepharis torrei Vollesen
- Blepharis trifida Vollesen
- Blepharis trispina Napper
- Blepharis turkanae Vollesen
- Blepharis uniflora C.B.Clarke
- Blepharis uzondoensis Vollesen
- Blepharis welwitschii S.Moore
