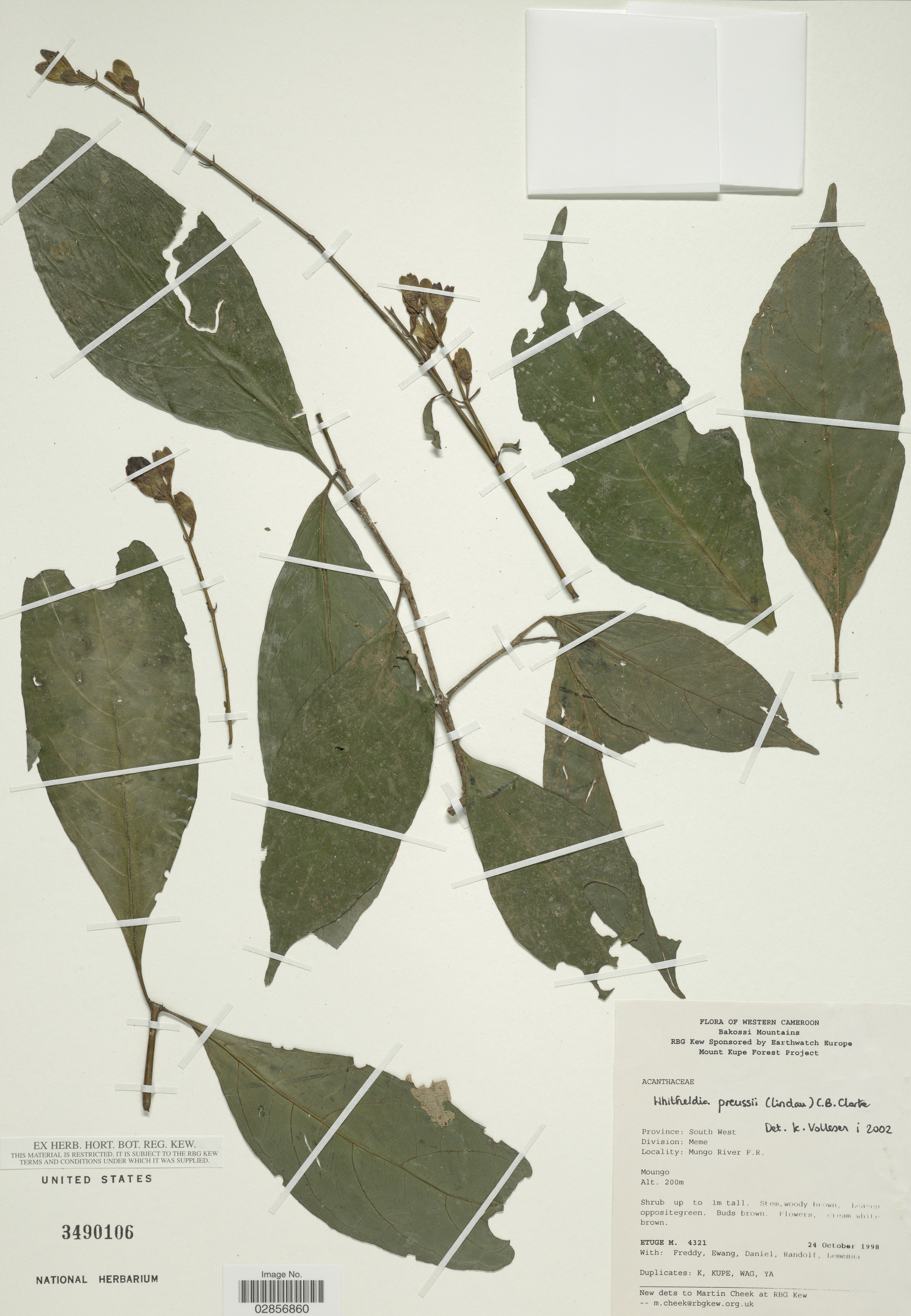
- Botanical specimen

Conservation status
- Vulnerable (IUCN 3.1)

Scientific classification
- Kingdom: Plantae
- Clade: Tracheophytes
- Clade: Angiosperms
- Clade: Eudicots
- Clade: Asterids
- Order: Lamiales
- Family: Acanthaceae
- Genus: Whitfieldia
- Species: W. preussii

Binomial name
- Whitfieldia preussii (Lindau) C.B.Clarke

= Whitfieldia preussii =

Species of flowering plant

Whitfieldia preussii is a species of plant in the family Acanthaceae. It is found in Cameroon and Equatorial Guinea. Its natural habitat is subtropical or tropical moist lowland forests. It is threatened by habitat loss.
