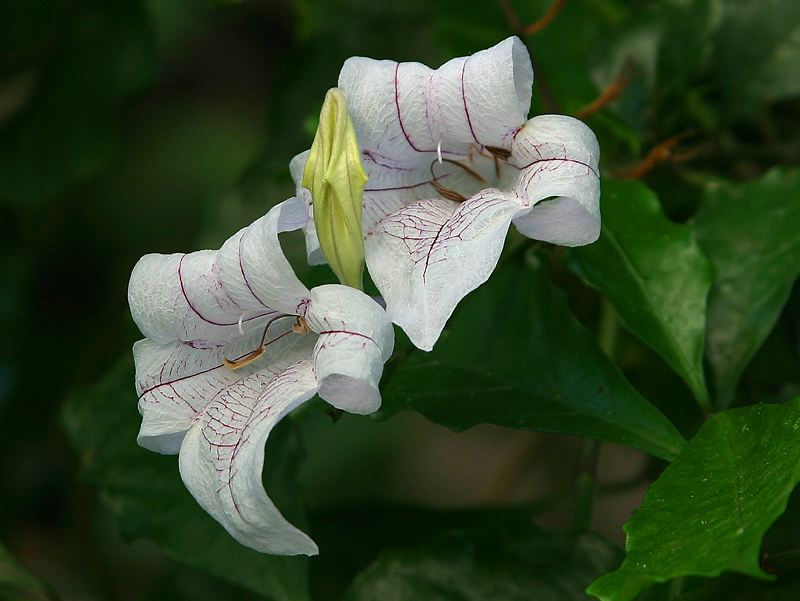
- Asystasia bella

Scientific classification
- Kingdom: Plantae
- Clade: Tracheophytes
- Clade: Angiosperms
- Clade: Eudicots
- Clade: Asterids
- Order: Lamiales
- Family: Acanthaceae
- Subfamily: Acanthoideae
- Tribe: Justicieae
- Genus: Asystasia; Blume

Species
- See text

Synonyms
- Asystasiella Lindau; Dicentranthera T.Anderson; Henfreya Lindl.; Intrusaria Raf.; Isochoriste Miq.; Parasystasia Baill.; Salpinctium T.J.Edwards; Styasasia S.Moore

= Asystasia =

Genus of flowering plants

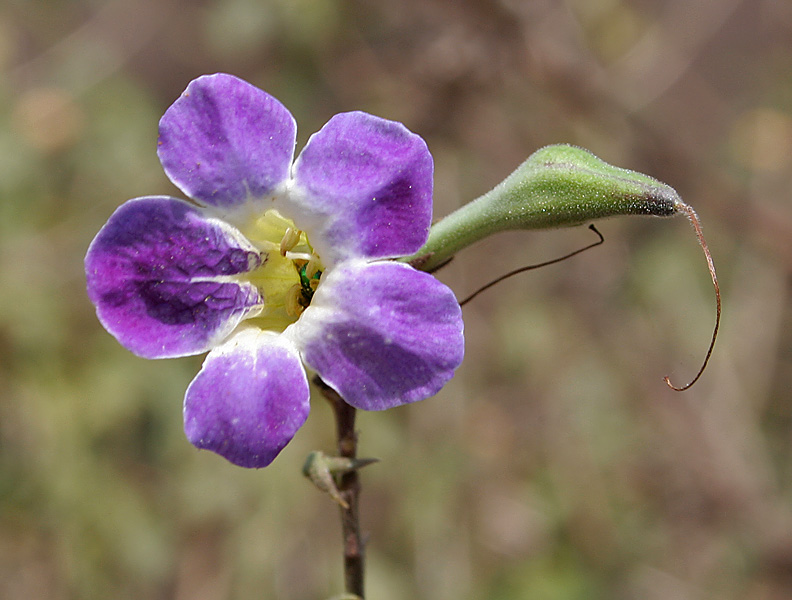
Asystasia gangetica

The genus Asystasia, assigned to the family Acanthaceae, comprises 59 species found in the tropics of Africa, Asia, Australia, and New Guinea. It includes the weedy species Asystasia gangetica.

== Species ==
59 species are accepted:

- Asystasia africana (S. Moore) C.B. Clarke
- Asystasia alba Ridl.
- Asystasia albiflora Ensermu
- Asystasia ammophila Ensermu
- Asystasia ansellioides C.B.Clarke
- Asystasia atriplicifolia Bremek.
- Asystasia australasica F.M.Bailey
- Asystasia buettneri Lindau
- Asystasia calcicola Ensermu & Vollesen
- Asystasia charmian S.Moore
- Asystasia chelnoides Nees
- Asystasia congensis C.B.Clarke
- Asystasia crispata Benth.
- Asystasia dalzelliana Santapau
- Asystasia excellens Lindau
- Asystasia gangetica (L.) T.Anderson
- Asystasia glandulifera Lindau
- Asystasia glandulosa Lindau
- Asystasia guttata (Forssk.) Brummitt
- Asystasia hedbergii Ensermu
- Asystasia hirsuta (T.J.Edwards) I.Darbysh. & E.A.Tripp
- Asystasia hispida J.B.Imlay
- Asystasia indica H.J.Chowdhery & Av.Bhattacharjee
- Asystasia intrusa (Forssk.) Blume
- Asystasia kerrii Craib
- Asystasia laticapsula C.B.Clarke ex Karlström
- Asystasia lawiana Dalzell
- Asystasia ledermannii Lindau
- Asystasia leptostachya Lindau
- Asystasia lindauiana Hutch. & Dalziel
- Asystasia linearis S.Moore
- Asystasia lorata Ensermu
- Asystasia macrophylla (T.Anderson) G.Nicholson
- Asystasia malawiana Brummitt & Chisumpa
- Asystasia masaiensis Lindau
- Asystasia minutiflora Ensermu & Vollesen
- Asystasia moorei Ensermu
- Asystasia mysorensis (Roth) T.Anderson
- Asystasia natalensis C.B.Clarke
- Asystasia nemorum Nees
- Asystasia noliae R.J.A.Puente
- Asystasia oppositiflora Bremek.
- Asystasia pusilla C.B.Clarke
- Asystasia retrocarpa T.J.Edwards
- Asystasia richardsiae Ensermu
- Asystasia riparia Lindau
- Asystasia salicifolia Craib
- Asystasia scandens (Lindl.) Hook.
- Asystasia schliebenii Mildbr.
- Asystasia stenosiphon C.B.Clarke
- Asystasia subbiflora C.B.Clarke
- Asystasia tanzaniensis Ensermu & Vollesen
- Asystasia travancorica Bedd.
- Asystasia trichotogyne Lindau
- Asystasia varia N.E.Br.
- Asystasia variabilis (Nees) Trimen
- Asystasia vogeliana Benth.
- Asystasia welwitschii S.Moore
- Asystasia zambiana Brummitt & Chisumpa

=== Formerly placed here ===
- Mackaya bella (as A. bella (Harvey) Benth. et Hook.f.)
