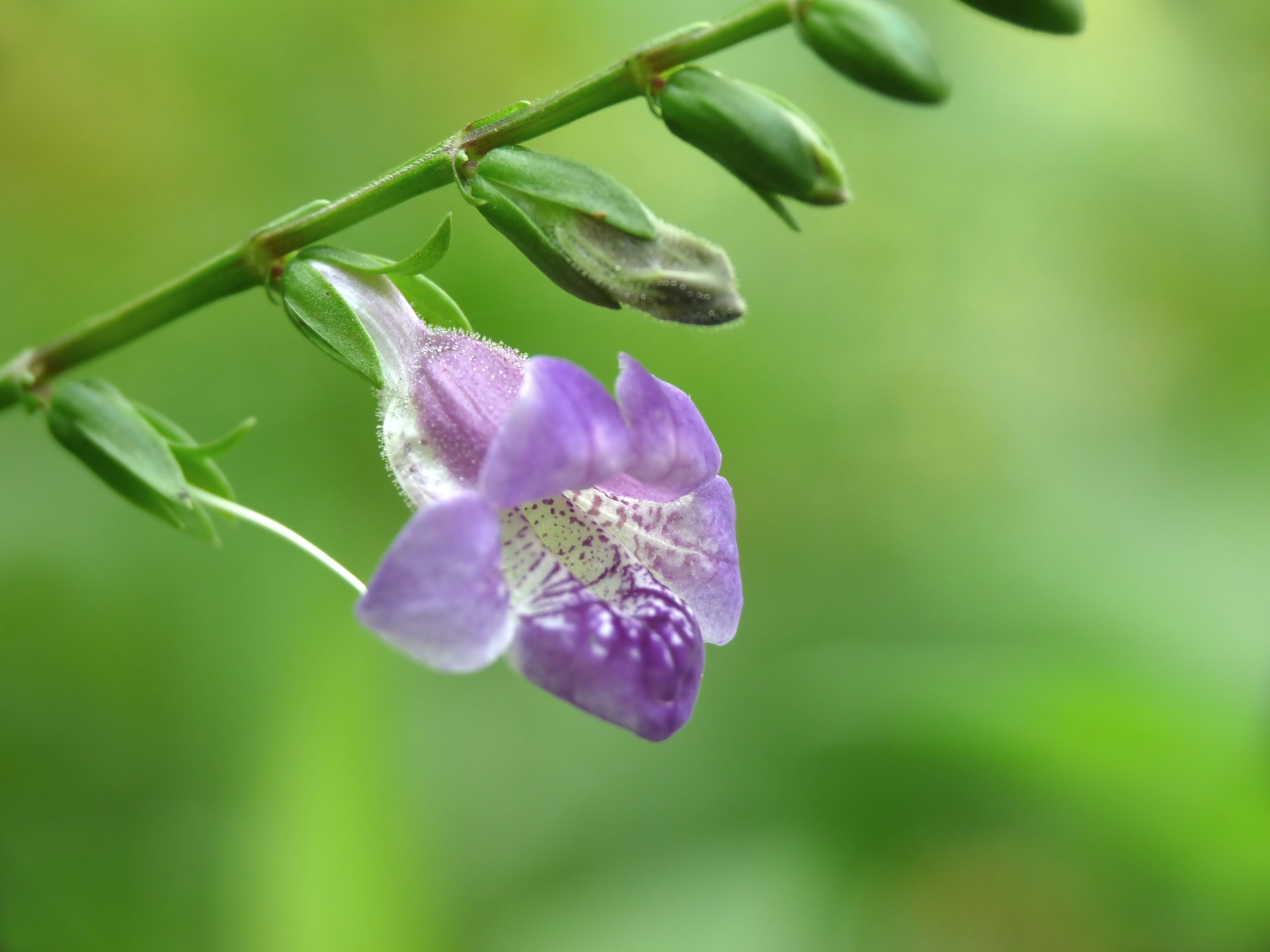

Scientific classification
- Kingdom: Plantae
- Clade: Tracheophytes
- Clade: Angiosperms
- Clade: Eudicots
- Clade: Asterids
- Order: Lamiales
- Family: Acanthaceae
- Genus: Asystasia
- Species: A. dalzelliana

Binomial name
- Asystasia dalzelliana Santapau

Synonyms
- Asystasia violacea Dalzell ex C.B.Clarke

= Asystasia dalzelliana =

Species of plant

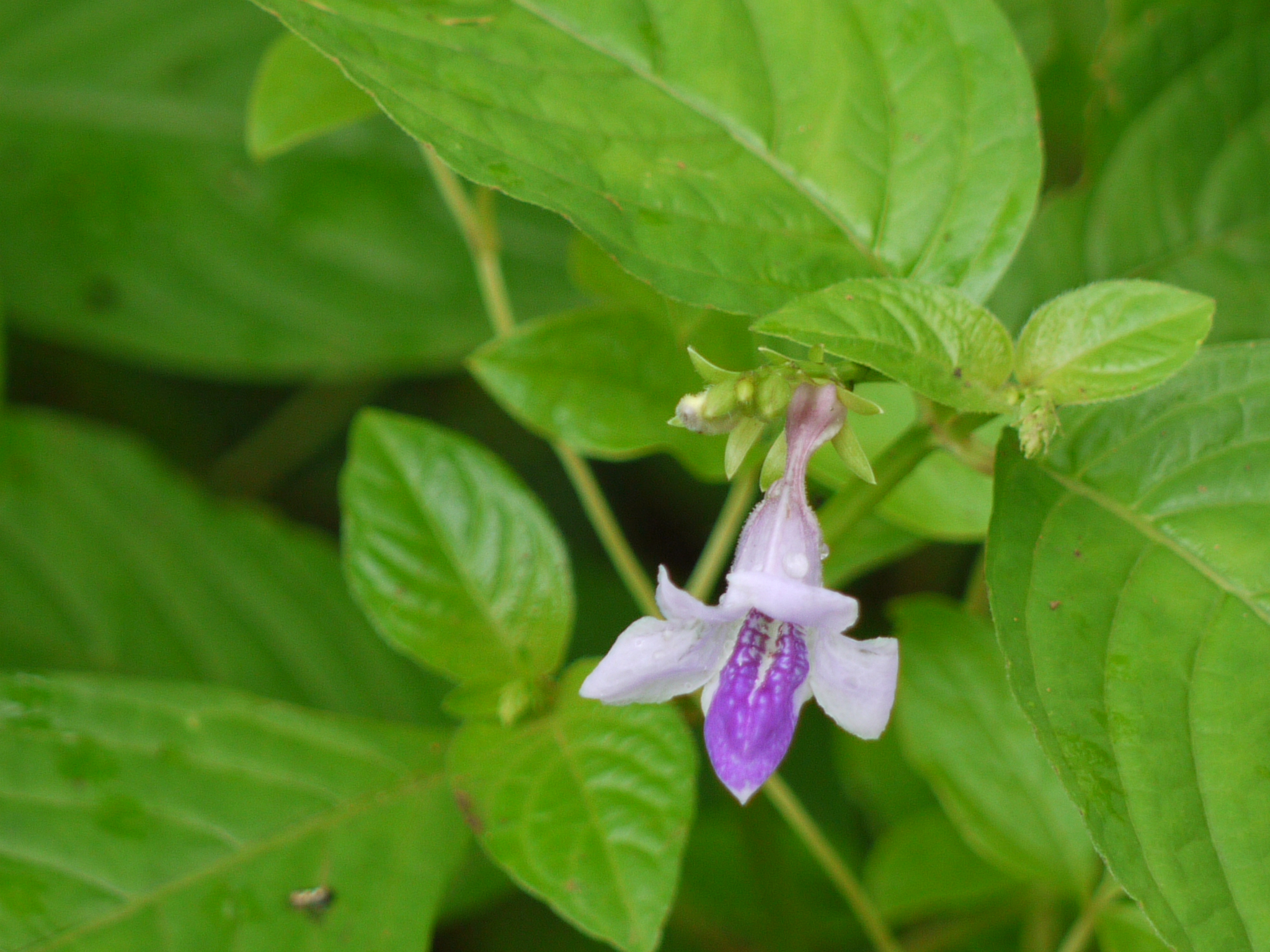
Asystasia dalzelliana

Asystasia dalzelliana is a species of plant in the family Acanthaceae It is commonly known as the violet asystasia, Chinese violet and Ganges primrose. It is distributed in Asia and Africa.

== Description ==
It is an annual, perennial, ground spreading herb with opposite leaves.

== Uses ==
The leaves are used as a vegetable in Kenya and Uganda. The plant has also uses in traditional medicine in Nigeria.
