= Blepharis dhofarensis =

Conservation status
- Vulnerable (IUCN 2.3)

Scientific classification
- Kingdom: Plantae
- Clade: Tracheophytes
- Clade: Angiosperms
- Clade: Eudicots
- Clade: Asterids
- Order: Lamiales
- Family: Acanthaceae
- Genus: Blepharis
- Species: B. dhofarensis

Binomial name
- Blepharis dhofarensis A.G.Mill.

Species of flowering plant

Blepharis dhofarensis is a species of plant in the family Acanthaceae. It is a shrub that grows to around 5m tall and is found in Oman and Yemen. Blepharis dhofarensis grows on wet escarpment woodlands and it prefers dense thickets on steep slopes. It is threatened by habitat loss. Recent molecular work has placed it in the genus Acanthus instead of Blepharis.

== Uses ==
Blepharis dhofarensis seeds in the prickly fruit heads were regarded as the very best fodder for camels by herders, especially milch camels. The leaves were also used as fodder. The fruits are mostly out of reach of the herds of goats, but herders would collect heads and extract the seeds to feed to sick or weak goats.

The long slim branches provided spear shafts and could also be used as kohl sticks. They could also be made into wedge-shaped hair dividers to part and section hair.
