= Asystasia glandulifera =

Conservation status
- Vulnerable (IUCN 3.1)

Scientific classification
- Kingdom: Plantae
- Clade: Tracheophytes
- Clade: Angiosperms
- Clade: Eudicots
- Clade: Asterids
- Order: Lamiales
- Family: Acanthaceae
- Genus: Asystasia
- Species: A. glandulifera

Binomial name
- Asystasia glandulifera Lindau

Species of flowering plant

Asystasia glandulifera is a species of plant in the family Acanthaceae. It is endemic to Cameroon. Its natural habitat is subtropical or tropical moist lowland forests.
