= Asteranthe asterias =

Conservation status
- Near Threatened (IUCN 3.1)

Scientific classification
- Kingdom: Plantae
- Clade: Embryophytes
- Clade: Tracheophytes
- Clade: Spermatophytes
- Clade: Angiosperms
- Clade: Magnoliids
- Order: Magnoliales
- Family: Annonaceae
- Genus: Asteranthe
- Species: A. asterias

Binomial name
- Asteranthe asterias (S. Moore) Engl. & Diels

Synonyms
- Asteranthe trollii Diels; Asteranthopsis asterias (S.Moore) Pilg. Uvaria asterias S.Moore

Species of plant

Asteranthe asterias is a species of plant in the family Annonaceae. It is native to Kenya and Tanzania. Spencer Le Marchant Moore, the English botanist who first formally described the species using the basionym Uvaria asterias, did not explicitly explain the epithet, but was likely referencing the star-like appearance of its flower's petals.

== Description ==
It is a tree reaching 1.5 to 8 meters in height. Its young branches are covered in dense grey or rust colored hairs. Its mature branches are hairless and have lenticels. Its oval to oblong leaves are 4-16.5 by 2-6 centimeters and come to a tapering point at their tips. The leaves are hairless and sometimes shiny on their upper surface, while their lower surface is densely hairy when young, but when mature hairless. Its petioles are 2-7 millimeters long. Its fragrant, hermaphroditic flowers are on 3-8 millimeter long pedicels that have oval, hairy bracteoles that are 2.5-4 by 1-1.5 millimeters. Its sepals are 0.6-1.2 by 4-7 millimeters, covered in dense rust colored hairs, and come to a tapered point at their tip. Its flowers have 6 petals. The petals are green when young, turning to a cream-color with deep purple highlights extending from their thick bases. The petals are 2.5-6 by 0.7-1.5 centimeters and taper to a sharp point at their tip. The petals are dense with silky hairs on the outer surface of their base, but less so at their apex. Its stamens are 1.5-2.5 millimeters long. Its flowers have 10-22 green, oblong, densely hairy carpels that are 2-2.5 millimeters long. Its carpels have around 10 ovules. Its fruit are 2-4 by 0.8-1 centimeters and covered in dense, brown, velvety hairs. Its yellow to brown seeds are 7-8 by 4-5 millimeters.

=== Reproductive biology ===
Its pollen is shed as permanent tetrads.

=== Distribution and habitat ===
It has been observed growing in coastal areas at elevations of 10 meters.

=== Uses ===
Bioactive molecules extracted from the bark of the stems and roots have been reported to have antiplasmodial and antitrypanosomal activities.
