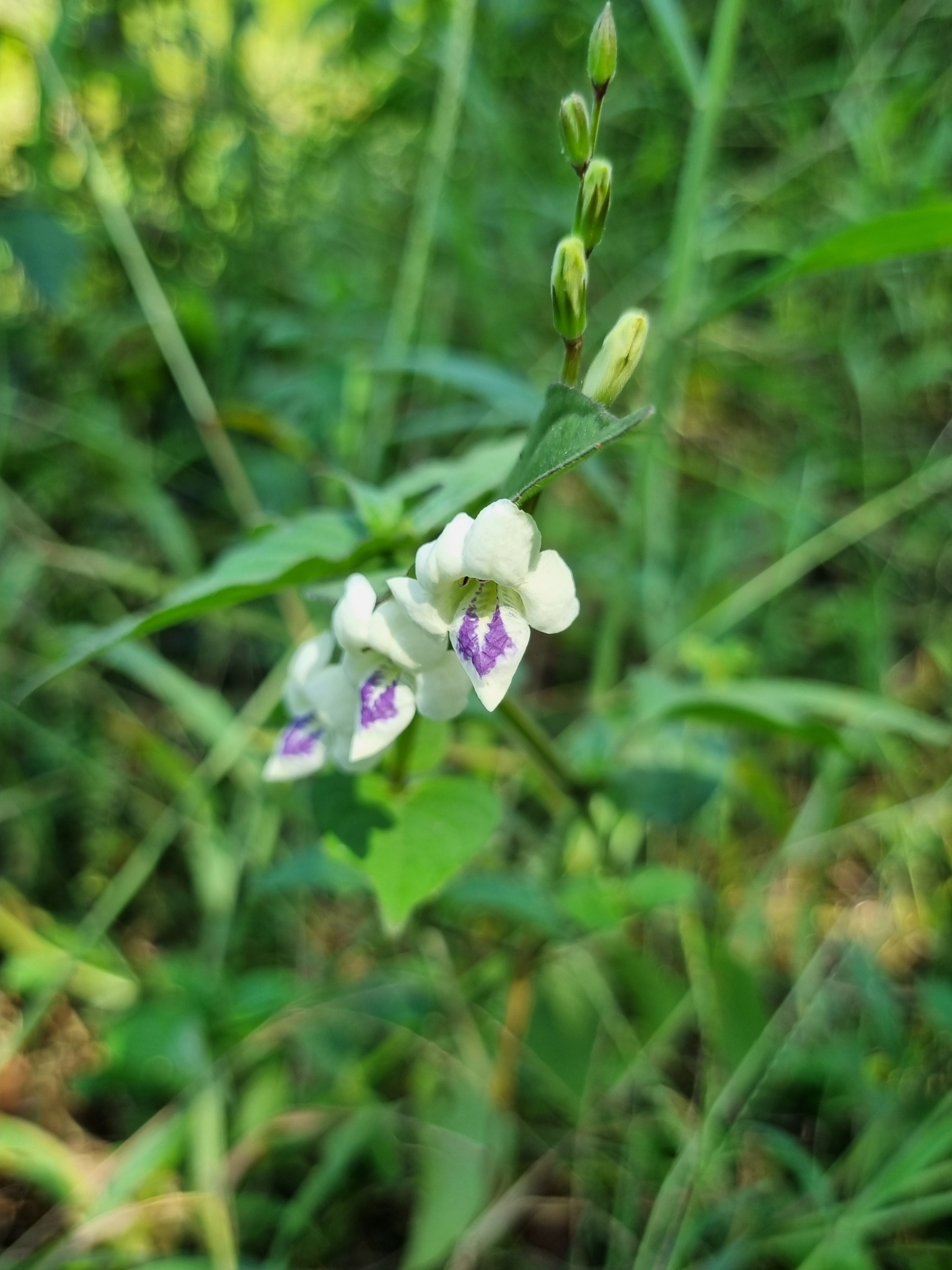

Scientific classification
- Kingdom: Plantae
- Clade: Embryophytes
- Clade: Tracheophytes
- Clade: Spermatophytes
- Clade: Angiosperms
- Clade: Eudicots
- Clade: Asterids
- Order: Lamiales
- Family: Acanthaceae
- Genus: Asystasia
- Species: A. intrusa

Binomial name
- Asystasia intrusa (Forssk.) Blume

= Asystasia intrusa =

Species of plant

Asystasia intrusa, also known as African coromandel, is a species of flowering plant in the family Acanthaceae, first described in 1775 by Forsskal. It is a scrambling annual or subshrub that grows mainly in seasonally dry tropical regions. The species is native to large parts of Tropical and Southern Africa, the Arabian Peninsula, Madagascar, and nearby islands. It has also been introduced to parts of Asia and the Americas, including China, Taiwan, Costa Rica, and Venezuela.
