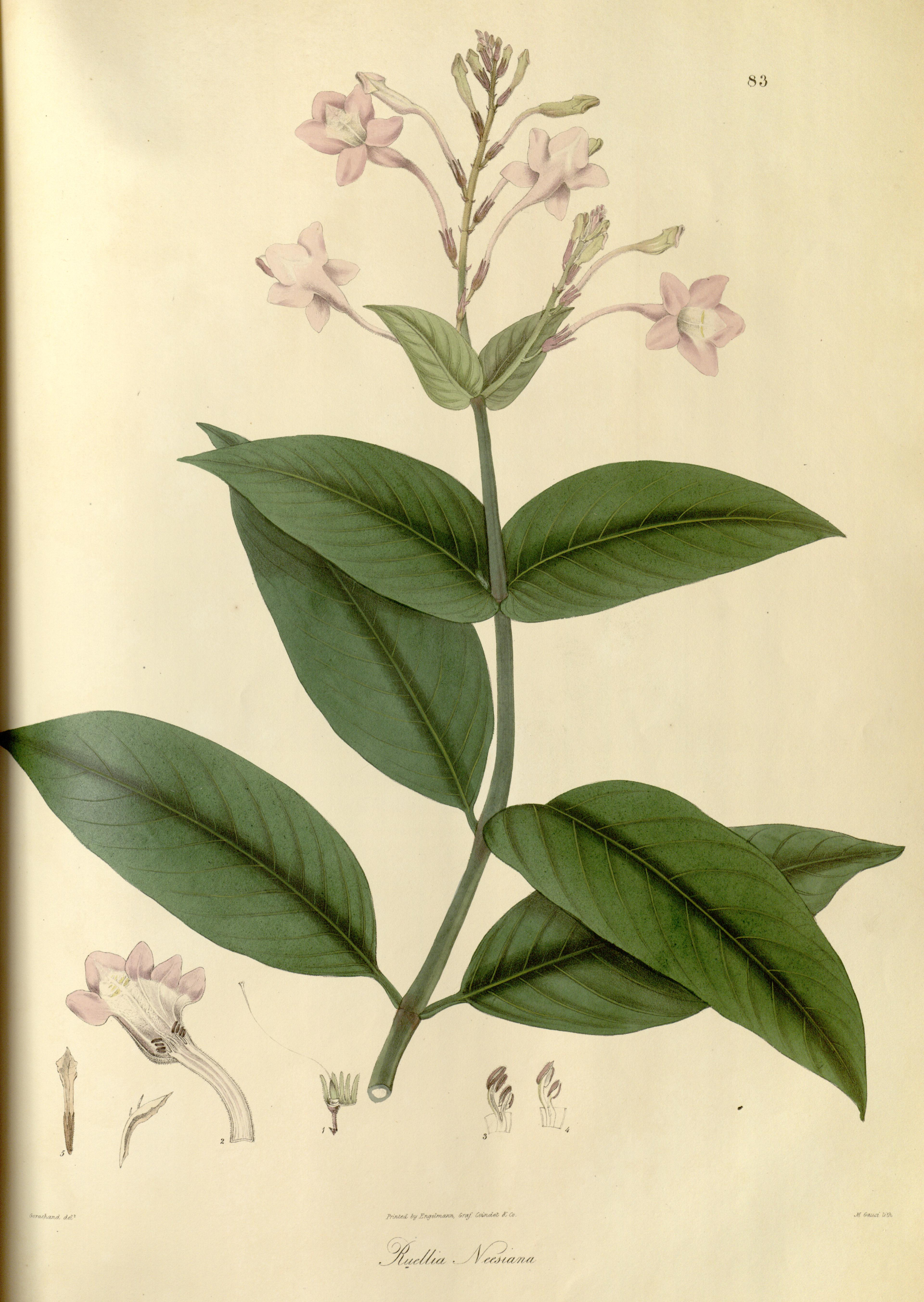

Scientific classification
- Kingdom: Plantae
- Clade: Tracheophytes
- Clade: Angiosperms
- Clade: Eudicots
- Clade: Asterids
- Order: Lamiales
- Family: Acanthaceae
- Genus: Mackaya
- Species: M. neesiana

Binomial name
- Mackaya neesiana (Wall.) Das

Synonyms
- Asystasia chinensis S.Moore; Asystasia neesiana (Wall.) Nees; Asystasiella chinensis (S.Moore) E.Hossain; Asystasiella neesiana (Wall.) Lindau; Ruellia crucis Steud.; Ruellia neesiana Wall.; Ruellia tetragona Thunb.

= Mackaya neesiana =

Species of plant

Mackaya neesiana is a plant species in the family Acanthaceae. It has various synonyms including Ruellia neesiana and Asystasiella neesiana. This species is cited in Journals of Travels in Assam, Burma, Bhootan, Afghanistan and The Neighbouring Countries by William Griffith under the synonym Ruellia neesiana.
