= Asystasia alba =

Scientific classification
- Kingdom: Plantae
- Clade: Tracheophytes
- Clade: Angiosperms
- Clade: Eudicots
- Clade: Asterids
- Order: Lamiales
- Family: Acanthaceae
- Genus: Asystasia
- Species: A. alba

Binomial name
- Asystasia alba Ridl.

Species of flowering plant

Asystasia alba is a species of tropical herb in the family Acanthaceae. It is endemic to Christmas Island, an Australian territory in the north-eastern Indian Ocean. Its specific epithet comes from the Latin alba (white), referring to the colour of its flowers.

== Description ==
Asystasia alba is an erect woody herb, growing to 0.5–0.75 m in height. Its 30–140 mm long leaves are ovate, acuminate or acute, pale green in colour and usually bristly when young. The inflorescence is 60–80 mm long, the flowers single or occasionally paired, the bracts and bracteoles about 2 mm long and the pedicels 1.5–3 mm long. The corolla is white or violet, and the tube 14–18 mm long. The capsule is usually 2-seeded and about 26 mm long. The seeds are 4 mm long.

Asystasia alba is a variable species; it forms part of a species complex that includes A. australasica and A. oppositiflora, but differs from both of them in having single flowers at each axil.

== Distribution and habitat ==
Found only on Christmas Island, the plant occurs in cleared areas on the island's terraces up to about 200 m above sea level.
