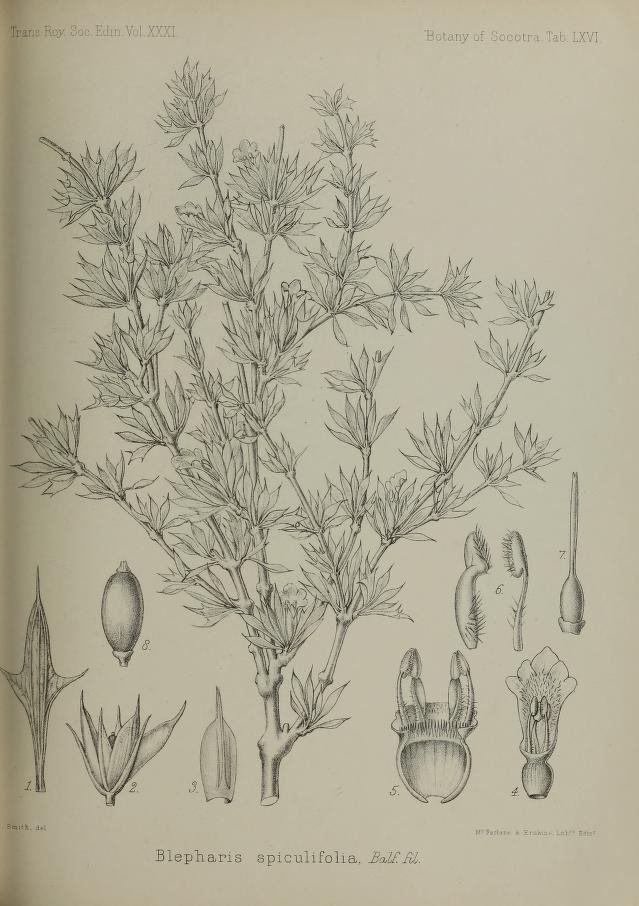
- Sketch of Blepharis spiculifolia

Conservation status
- Vulnerable (IUCN 3.1)

Scientific classification
- Kingdom: Plantae
- Clade: Tracheophytes
- Clade: Angiosperms
- Clade: Eudicots
- Clade: Asterids
- Order: Lamiales
- Family: Acanthaceae
- Genus: Blepharis
- Species: B. spiculifolia

Binomial name
- Blepharis spiculifolia Balf.f.

= Blepharis spiculifolia =

Species of plant

Blepharis spiculifolia is a species of plant in the family Acanthaceae. It is endemic to Socotra. Its natural habitats are subtropical or tropical dry shrubland and subtropical or tropical dry lowland grassland.
