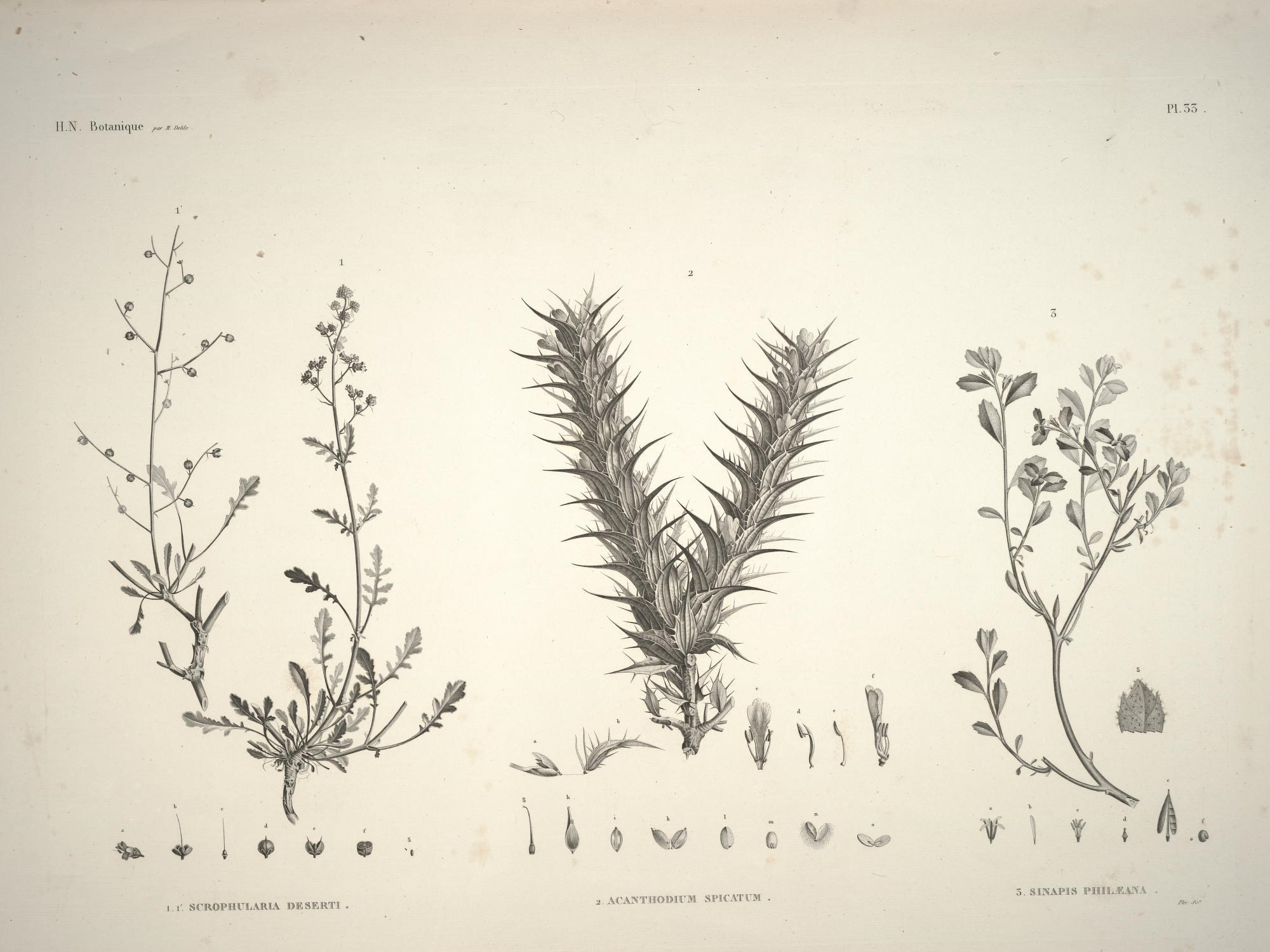
- Blepharis edulis (middle)

Scientific classification
- Kingdom: Plantae
- Clade: Tracheophytes
- Clade: Angiosperms
- Clade: Eudicots
- Clade: Asterids
- Order: Lamiales
- Family: Acanthaceae
- Genus: Blepharis
- Species: B. edulis

Binomial name
- Blepharis edulis Forssk.

= Blepharis edulis =

Species of flowering plant

Blepharis edulis (Hindi : uttanjan) is a species of plant in the family Acanthaceae. It is found in India, Pakistan and Iran as well as Egypt (including the Sinai Peninsula). It is a small plant, covered in soft, grey hairs. It has many serrated leaves, that have prickles attached to them. The flowers are a yellowish color. Its capsules contain two seeds, that are heart-shaped, smooth, shining, and brownish in color. In India, it is commonly known as Dakhni chappar or Utangan.

== In medicine ==
The seeds, leaves, and roots of this plant are used in the traditional medicine of India.

== Chemical constituents ==
Phytochemicals such as benzoxazine glucosides and banzoxazolone are present in this species, and antixoidants such as phenolic acids and flavone glycosides are also confirmed present.
