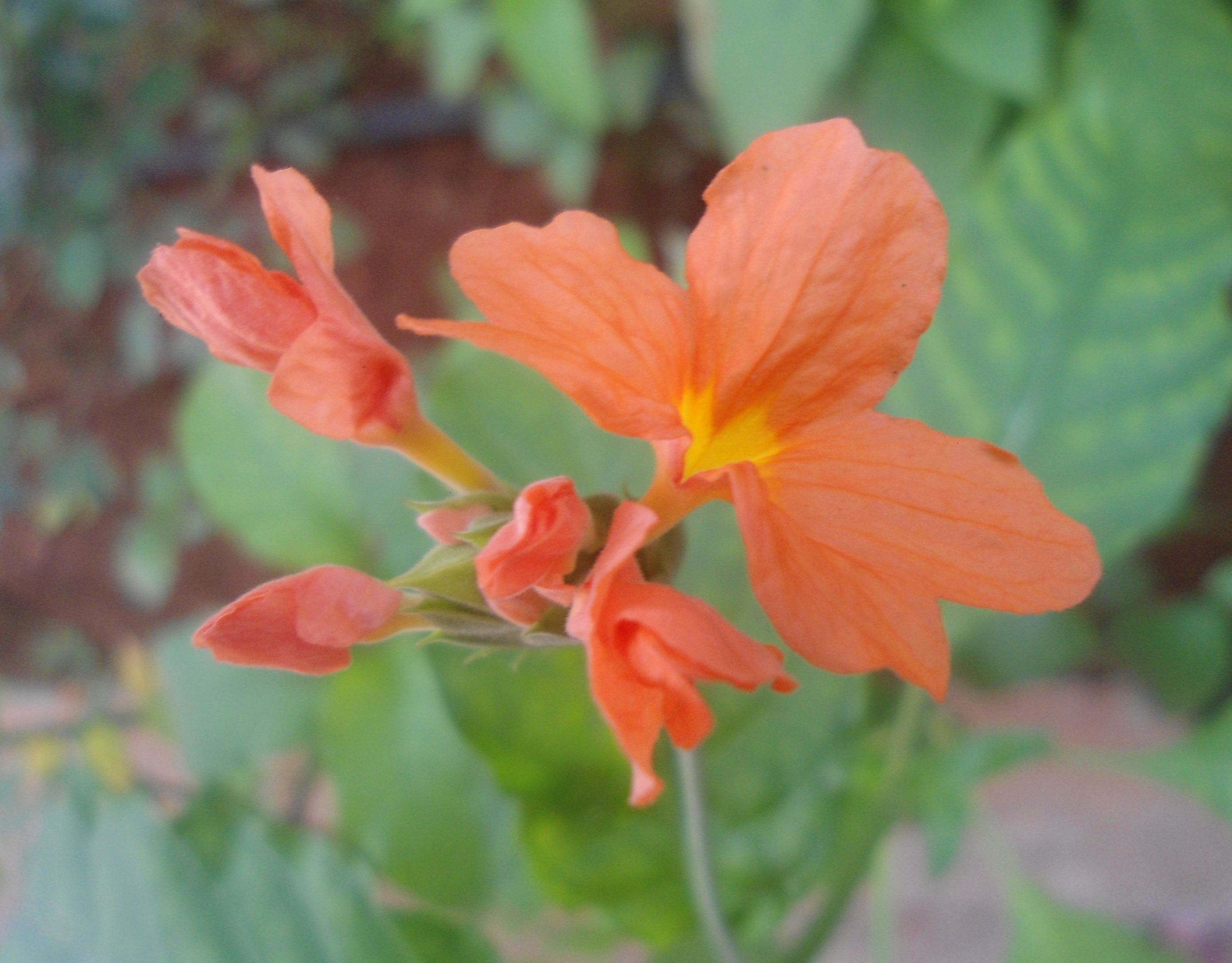

Conservation status
- Least Concern (IUCN 3.1)

Scientific classification
- Kingdom: Plantae
- Clade: Tracheophytes
- Clade: Angiosperms
- Clade: Eudicots
- Clade: Asterids
- Order: Lamiales
- Family: Acanthaceae
- Genus: Crossandra
- Species: C. infundibuliformis

Binomial name
- Crossandra infundibuliformis (L.) Nees

Synonyms
- Justicia infundibuliformis L.; Crossandra undulifolia Salisb.

= Crossandra infundibuliformis =

Species of flowering plant

Crossandra infundibuliformis, the firecracker flower or firecracker plant, is a species of flowering plant in the family Acanthaceae. It is native to Angola, Burundi, Ethiopia, Kenya, Somalia, Sri Lanka, India and the Democratic Republic of the Congo.

== Description ==
The plant is an erect, evergreen shrub growing to 1 m with glossy, wavy-margined leaves and fan-shaped flowers, which may appear at any time throughout the year. The flowers are unusually shaped with 3 to 5 asymmetrical petals. They grow from four-sided stalked spikes, and have a tube-like 2 cm stalk. Flower colours range from the common orange to salmon-orange or apricot, coral to red, yellow and even turquoise.

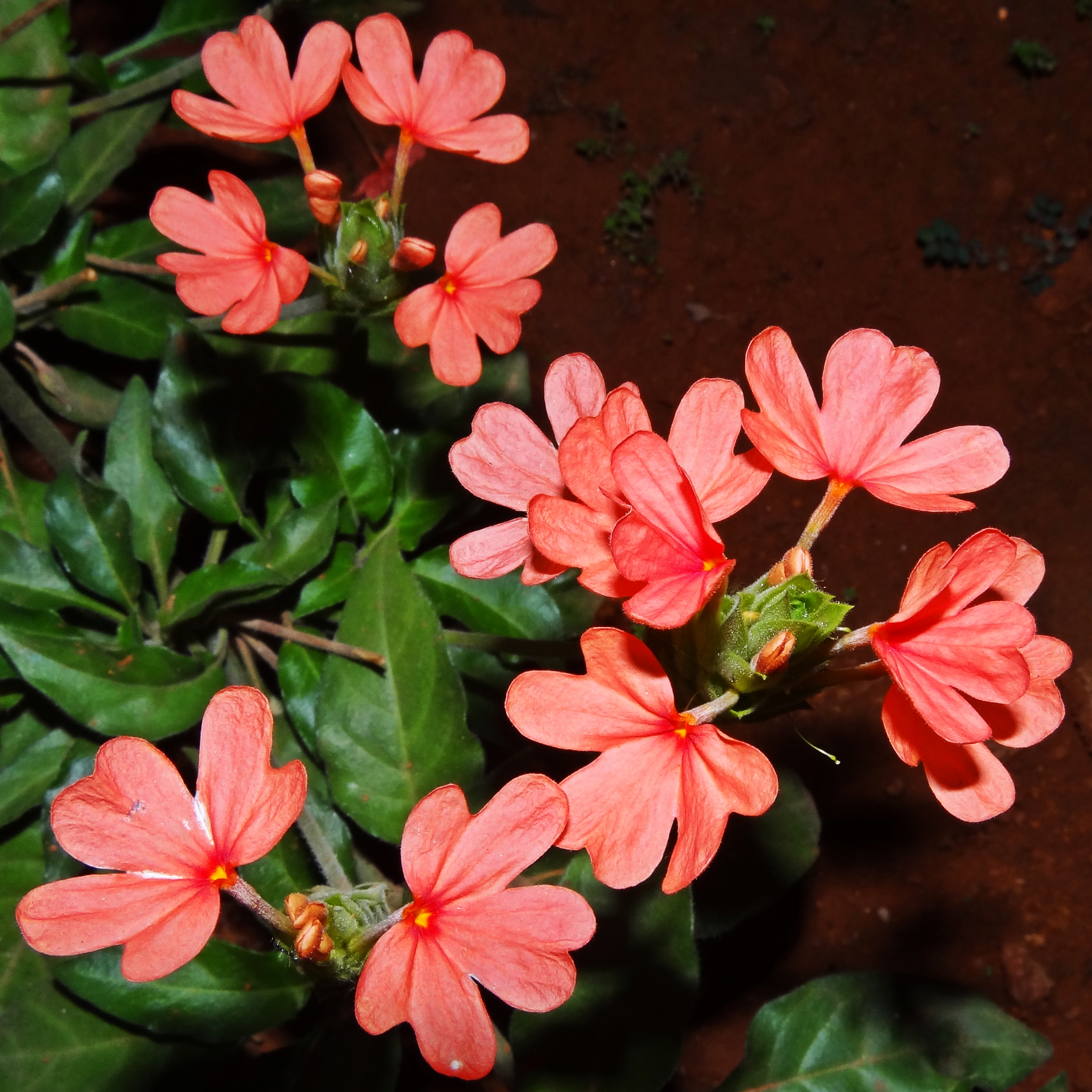
In Tumkur, India

== Cultivation and uses ==
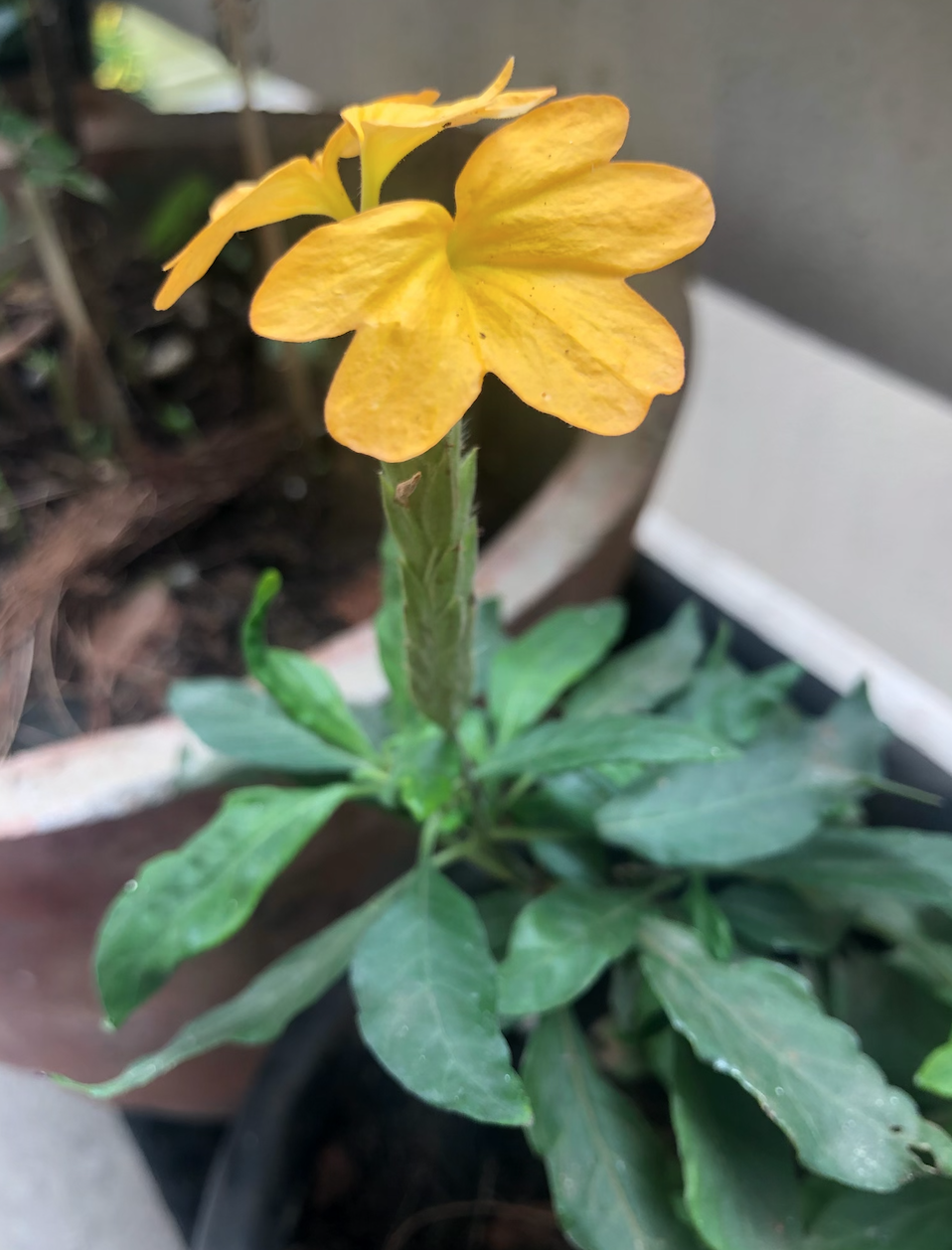
As potted plant

This plant requires a minimum temperature of 10 °C, and in temperate and tropical regions is cultivated as a houseplant. It is usually grown in containers but can be attractive in beds as well. The flowers have no perfume but stay fresh for several days on the bush. A well-tended specimen will bloom continuously for years. It is propagated by seeds or cuttings. This plant has gained the Royal Horticultural Society's Award of Garden Merit. (confirmed 2017).

The tiny flowers are often strung together into strands, sometimes along with white jasmine flowers and therefore in great demand for making garlands which are offered to temple deities or used to embellish women's hair.

== Name ==
The common name "firecracker flower" refers to the seed pods, which are found after the flower has dried up, and tend to "explode" when near high humidity or rainfall. The "explosion" releases the seeds onto the ground, thereby creating new seedlings. The Latin specific epithet infundibuliformis means funnel or trumpet shaped.
