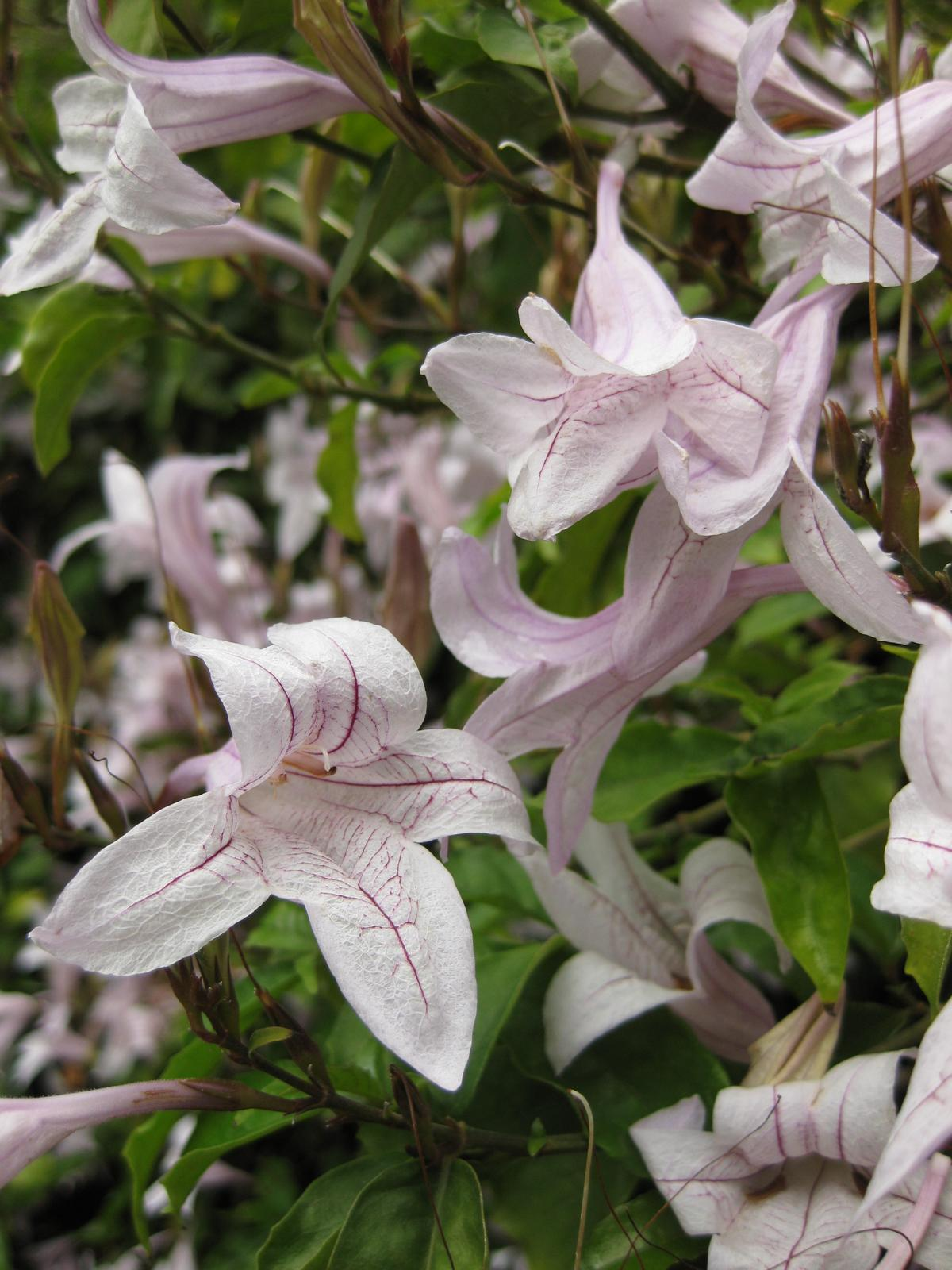
- Flowers are bilaterally symmetric.

Conservation status
- Least Concern (IUCN 3.1)

Scientific classification
- Kingdom: Plantae
- Clade: Embryophytes
- Clade: Tracheophytes
- Clade: Angiosperms
- Clade: Eudicots
- Clade: Asterids
- Order: Lamiales
- Family: Acanthaceae
- Genus: Mackaya
- Species: M. bella

Binomial name
- Mackaya bella Harv.

Synonyms
- Asystasia bella (Harv.) Vesque

= Mackaya bella =

Species of flowering plant

Mackaya bella, called the forest bell bush, is a species of flowering plant in the acanthus family Acanthaceae, native to South Africa (Cape Provinces, KwaZulu-Natal, and Northern Provinces) and Eswatini.

== Description ==
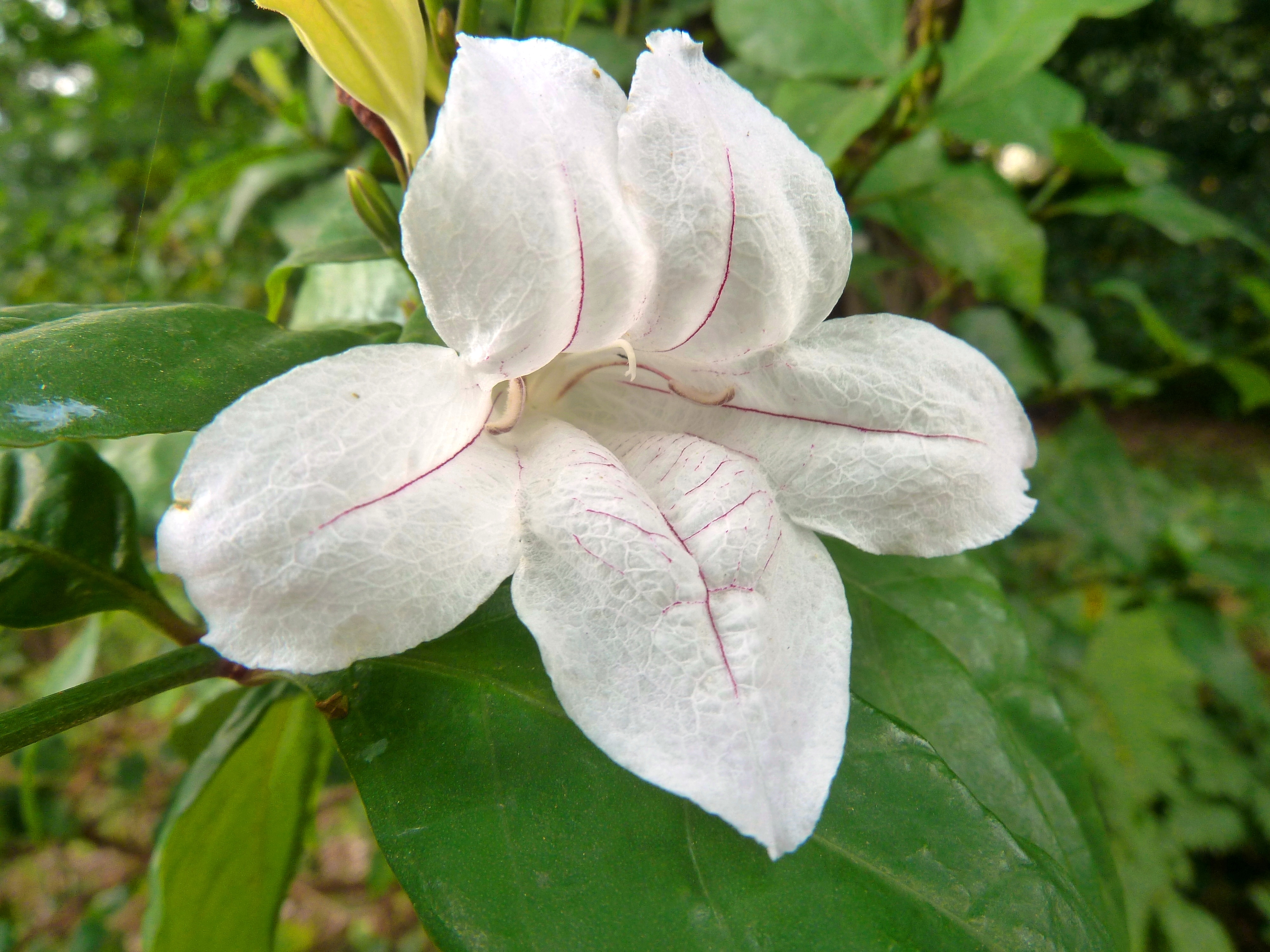
Flower

Growing to 1.5 m (4.9 ft) tall and broad, it is an erect, evergreen shrub with opposite arranged 4-to-5-inch (10 to 13 cm) long glossy, slim, elliptically-shaped dark green leaves that feature wavy margins and salient midrib and veins on the lower surface.

2 inch long, trumpet-shaped, pale lilac to lavender flowers veined in purple appear profusely in spring and early summer. The throats have noticeable deep purple veins.

== Cultivation ==
The plant is not hardy below −6 °C (21 °F), therefore in colder temperate zones requires protection during the winter months. However, it may be placed outside in a sheltered spot in summer. It requires an alkaline or neutral soil.

It has gained the Royal Horticultural Society's Award of Garden Merit.
