= Raymond Benoist =

French botanist and entomologist

- Born: 10 June 1881; Vendresse
- Died: 17 January 1970 (aged 88)
- Occupations: botanist and entomologist
- Scientific career
- Author abbrev. (botany): Benoist

Raymond Benoist (10 June 1881, Vendresse – 17 January 1970) was a French botanist and entomologist. He is known for his research involving the plant family Acanthaceae.

He studied botany in Paris, receiving his doctorate in 1912. Following graduation, he served as an assistant at the École pratique des Hautes Études. In 1913–14 he was sent by the government to French Guiana to conduct studies of its forests. He later made two scientific trips to Morocco — the first expedition being to the Middle Atlas and the High Moulouya for the Muséum national d'histoire naturelle (1918), and the second trip as an expedition leader for the Institut Scientifique Cherifien de Rabat (1928). In 1930–32 he taught classes in botany at the medical school in Quito. During his time spent in Ecuador, he conducted phytogeographical research as well as studies in regards to the morphology and biology of plants native to the Andes.

From 1933 to 1942, he served as a deputy director at the Muséum national d'histoire naturelle. Later on, he was named head of research at the Centre National de la Recherche Scientifique (CNRS), and in 1949-1952, was director of botanical services at the Institut de Recherche Scientifique de Madagascar (ORSTOM) in Tananarive.

In 1908 he became a member of the Société botanique de France, being elected as its president in 1947. As a taxonomist, he described many species within the botanical family Acanthaceae. In the field of entomology, he published a number of works on Hymenoptera — along with Lucien Berland, he was co-author of the section on Hymenoptera in Rémy Perrier's "La Faune de la France en tableaux synoptiques illustrés" (Tome 7, Hyménoptères).

== Selected works ==
- Recherches sur la structure de la classification des acanthacées de la tribu des barlériées, 1912.
- Mission d'études forestières envoyée dans les colonies françaises par les ministères de la guerre de l'armement et des colonies, 1920 (co-author).
- Les bois de la Guyane Française, 1933.
- Catalogue des plantes de Madagascar: Acanthacées, 1939.
- Descriptions de nouvelles acanthacées malgaches, 1943.
