= Kaj Borge Vollesen =

Botanist

- Born: 27 January 1946 (age 80)
- Education: University of Copenhagen
- Scientific career
- Fields: Botany
- Workplaces: Royal Botanic Gardens, Kew
- Author abbrev. (botany): Vollesen

Kaj Borge Vollesen (born 27 January 1946) is a botanist.

== Education ==
Vollessen received his MSc (1975) in Taxonomic Botany and PhD (1982) in Taxonomy and Ecology from The University of Copenhagen.

== Work ==
He was a Principal Scientific Officer at the Kew Gardens until his retirement in 2006 and is now an Honorary Research Fellow. His work is principally focused on the Acanthaceae and Cyperaceae families of plants.

== Legacy ==
He is the authority for at least 327 taxa.
