= List of butterflies of Mauritius =

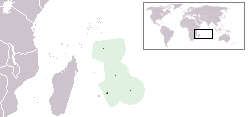
Location of Mauritius

This is a list of butterflies of Mauritius. About thirty-nine species are known from the islands of Mauritius and Rodrigues, seven of which are endemic.

== Papilionidae ==
=== Papilioninae ===
==== Papilionini ====
- Papilio demodocus Esper, [1798]
- Papilio manlius Fabricius, 1798

== Pieridae ==
=== Coliadinae ===
- Eurema brigitta pulchella (Boisduval, 1833)
- Eurema floricola ceres (Butler, 1886)
- Catopsilia florella thauruma (Reakirt, 1866)

== Lycaenidae ==
=== Theclinae ===
==== Theclini ====
- Deudorix antalus (Hopffer, 1855)

=== Polyommatinae ===
==== Polyommatini ====
- Pseudonacaduba sichela reticulum (Mabille, 1877)
- Cacyreus darius (Mabille, 1877)
- Zizeeria knysna (Trimen, 1862)
- Zizina antanossa (Mabille, 1877)
- Zizula hylax (Fabricius, 1775)
- Lampides boeticus (Linnaeus, 1767)
- Leptotes mandersi (Druce, 1907)
- Leptotes pirithous (Linnaeus, 1767)

== Nymphalidae ==
=== Libytheinae ===
- Libythea cinyras Trimen, 1866

=== Danainae ===
==== Danaini ====
- Danaus plexippus (Linnaeus, 1758)
- Danaus chrysippus (Linnaeus, 1798)
- Amauris phoedon (Fabricius, 1798)
- Euploea desjardinsii (Guérin-Méneville, 1844)
- Euploea euphon (Fabricius, 1798)

=== Satyrinae ===
==== Satyrini ====
- Heteropsis narcissus (Fabricius, 1798)

==== Melanitini ====
- Melanitis leda (Linnaeus, 1758)

=== Nymphalinae ===
==== Nymphalini ====
- Antanartia borbonica mauritiana Manders, 1908
- Vanessa cardui (Linnaeus, 1758)
- Junonia goudotii (Boisduval, 1833)
- Junonia rhadama (Boisduval, 1833)
- Salamis augustina vinsoni Le Cerf, 1922
- Hypolimnas anthedon drucei (Butler, 1874)
- Hypolimnas bolina jacintha (Drury, [1773])
- Hypolimnas misippus (Linnaeus, 1764)

=== Limenitinae ===
==== Neptidini ====
- Neptis frobenia (Fabricius, 1798)

=== Heliconiinae ===
==== Vagrantini ====
- Phalanta phalantha aethiopica (Rothschild & Jordan, 1903)

== Hesperiidae ==
=== Coeliadinae ===
- Coeliades ernesti (Grandidier, 1867)
- Coeliades forestan (Stoll, [1782])

=== Pyrginae ===
==== Tagiadini ====
- Eagris sabadius (Gray, 1832)

=== Hesperiinae ===
==== Aeromachini ====
- Erionota thrax (Linnaeus, 1767)

==== Baorini ====
- Borbo borbonica (Boisduval, 1833)
- Parnara naso (Fabricius, 1798)

== See also ==
- List of moths of Mauritius
- Wildlife of Mauritius
