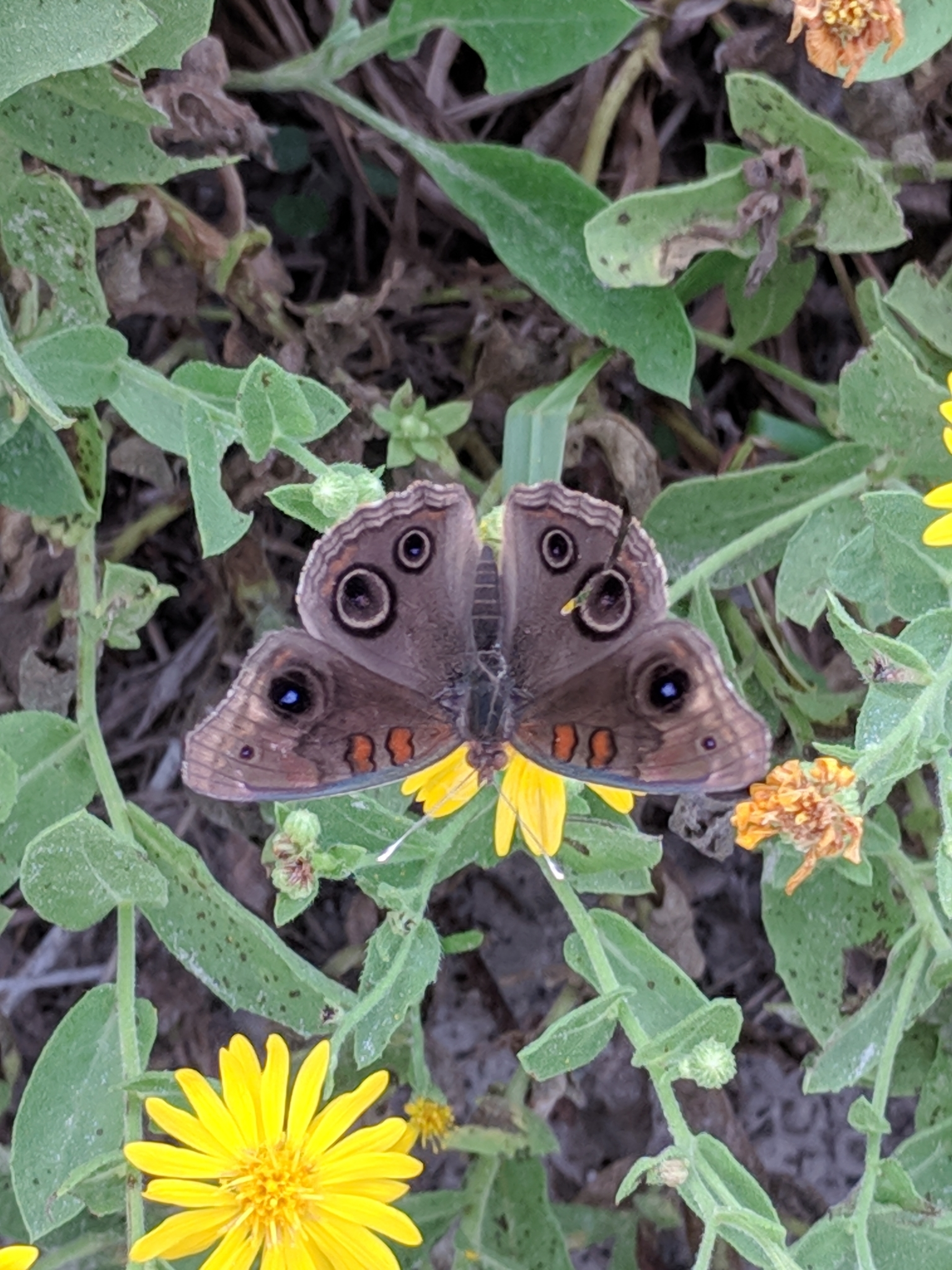
- Junonia stemosa, twintip buckeye, Texas

Conservation status
- Unrankable (NatureServe)

Scientific classification
- Kingdom: Animalia
- Phylum: Arthropoda
- Class: Insecta
- Order: Lepidoptera
- Family: Nymphalidae
- Genus: Junonia
- Species: J. stemosa

Binomial name
- Junonia stemosa Grishin, 2020

= Junonia stemosa =

Species of butterfly

Junonia stemosa, commonly known as the twintip buckeye, is a butterfly species in the family Nymphalidae. It was described in 2020 and is found in southern Texas, particularly on barrier islands such as South Padre Island. Its larval host plant is Stemodia tomentosa (woolly stemodia), a light gray perennial common in sandy coastal soils. J. stemosa is closely related to Junonia coenia (the common buckeye) but can be distinguished by its unique morphological and ecological adaptations that allow it to feed on S. tomentosa.

== Classification and taxonomy ==
Junonia stemosa was formally described in 2020 as part of a genomic revision of North American Junonia butterflies. The species was identified as genetically and morphologically distinct from both Junonia coenia (the common buckeye) and Junonia nigrosuffusa (the dark buckeye). Analyses showed that populations feeding on Stemodia tomentosa in southern Texas represented a separate evolutionary lineage within the genus Junonia. Earlier authors frequently treated these populations as part of J. nigrosuffusa or as melanistic forms of J. coenia, but whole-genome comparisons revealed consistent divergence in a suite of “speciation proteins,” supporting the recognition of J. stemosa as a distinct species within the family Nymphalidae and tribe Junoniini. Phylogenetic analyses place J. stemosa near the coenia–grisea species pair, and further show that J. nigrosuffusa may represent a hybrid species formed by ancestral J. stemosa and Junonia grisea lineages. This relationship explains the morphological similarity between J. stemosa and J. nigrosuffusa despite their genetic distinctiveness.

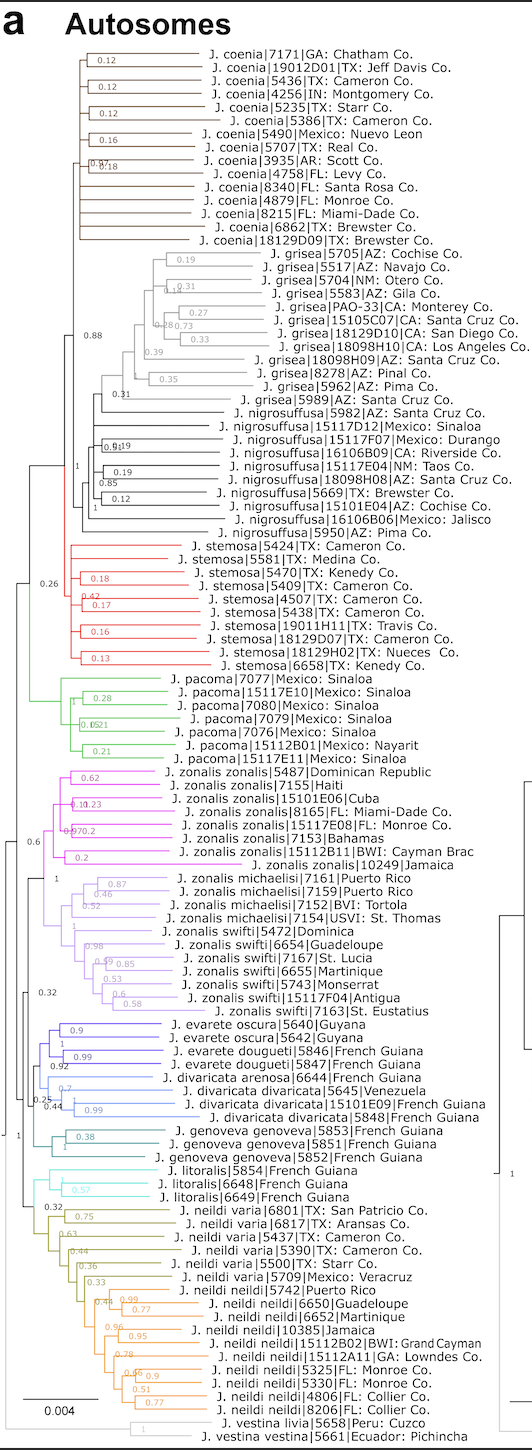
Junonia Phylogeny - autosomes

== Morphology ==
Adult Junonia stemosa closely resembles the common buckeye (Junonia coenia) but can be distinguished by its more angular and slightly elongated forewing apex. The dorsal surface is generally darker than that of J. coenia, with reduced orange patterning and a subtle purplish or bluish sheen visible in some individuals. The ventral wings are usually brown or gray with clearly defined eyespots that contribute to predator deterrence. These traits, together with genomic differences, support its distinction from both J. coenia and Junonia nigrosuffusa.

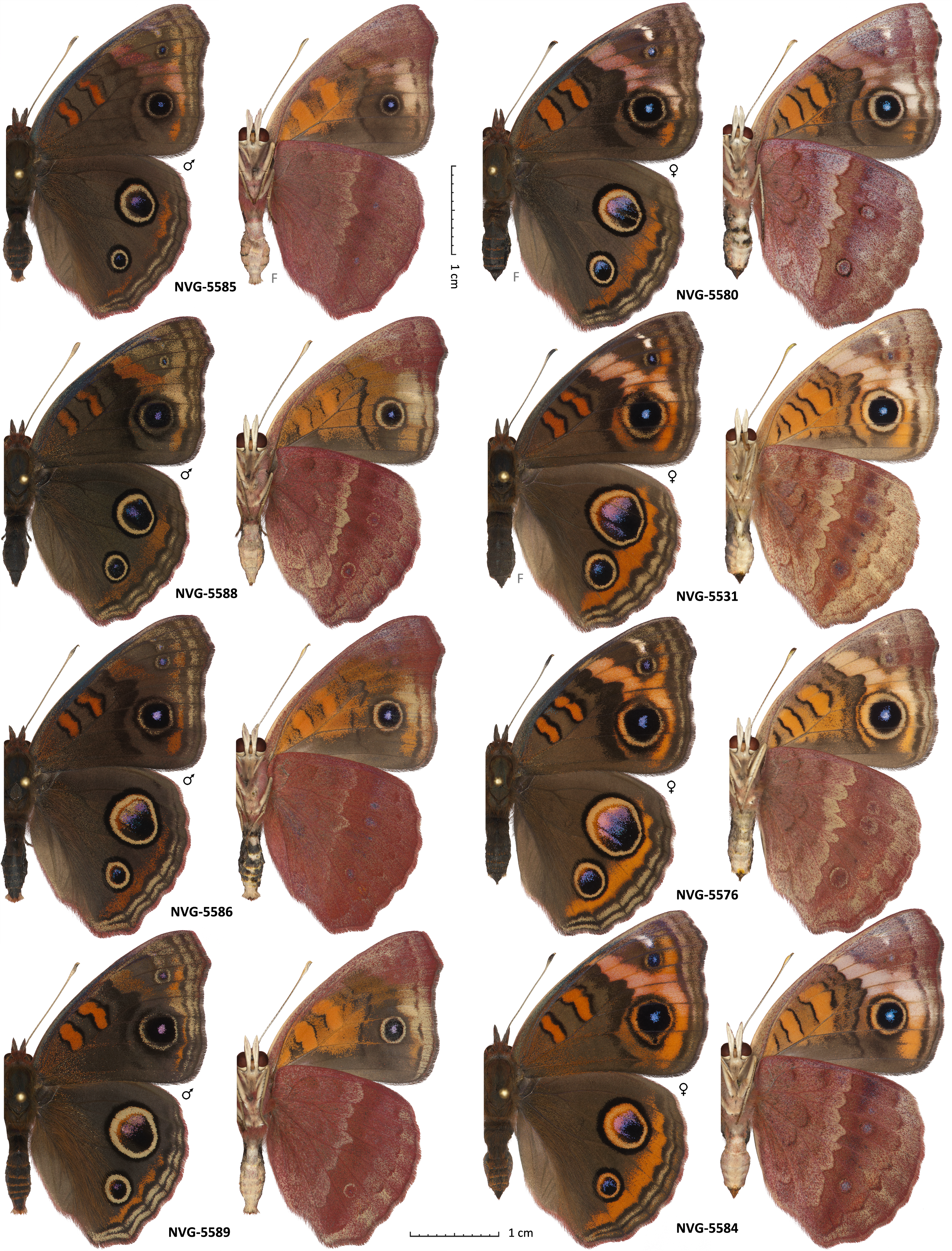
Wing pattern variation in Junonia stemosa

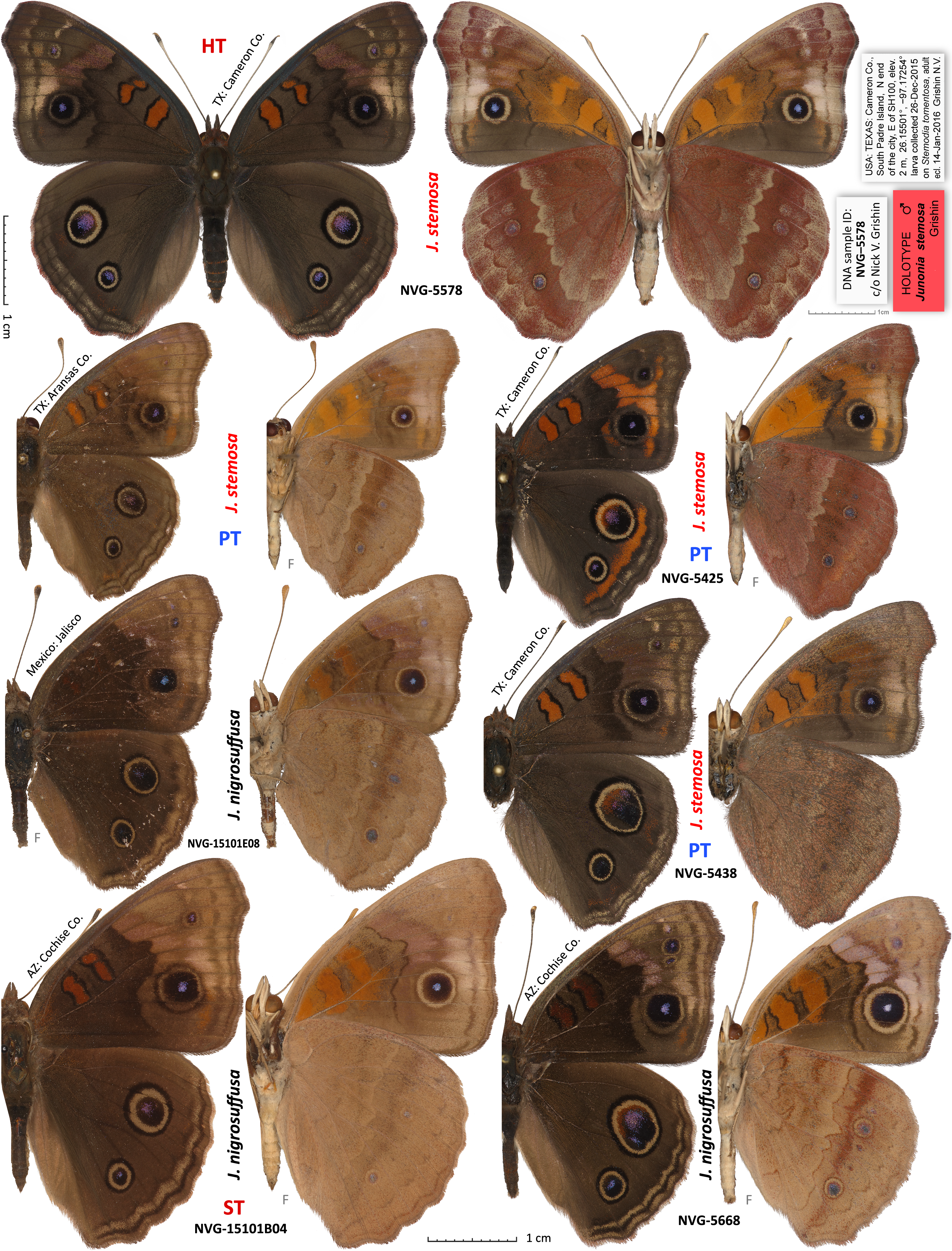
Junonia stemosa sp.n. compared with Junonia nigrosuffusa

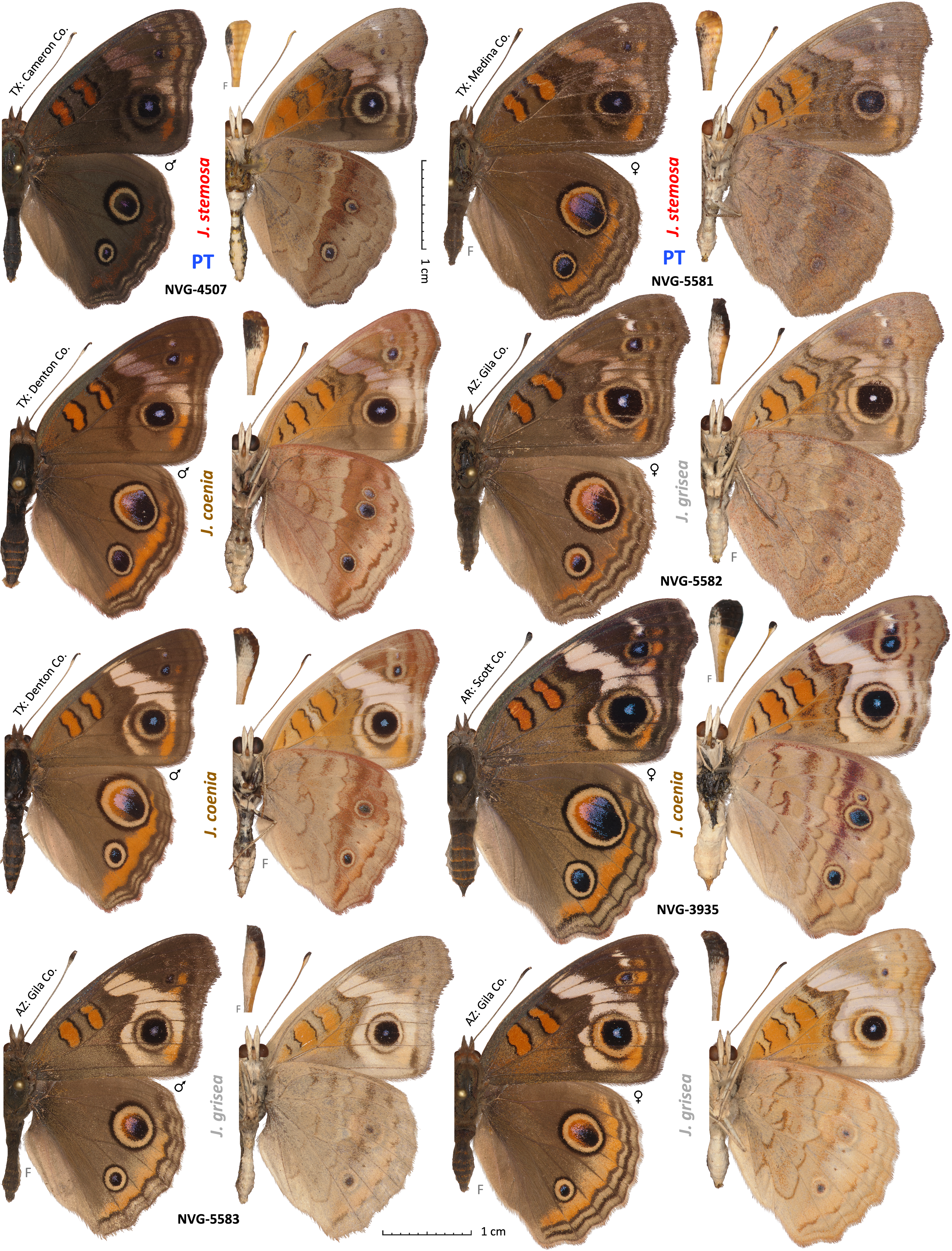
Junonia stemosa sp.n. compared with Junonia coenia and Junonia grisea

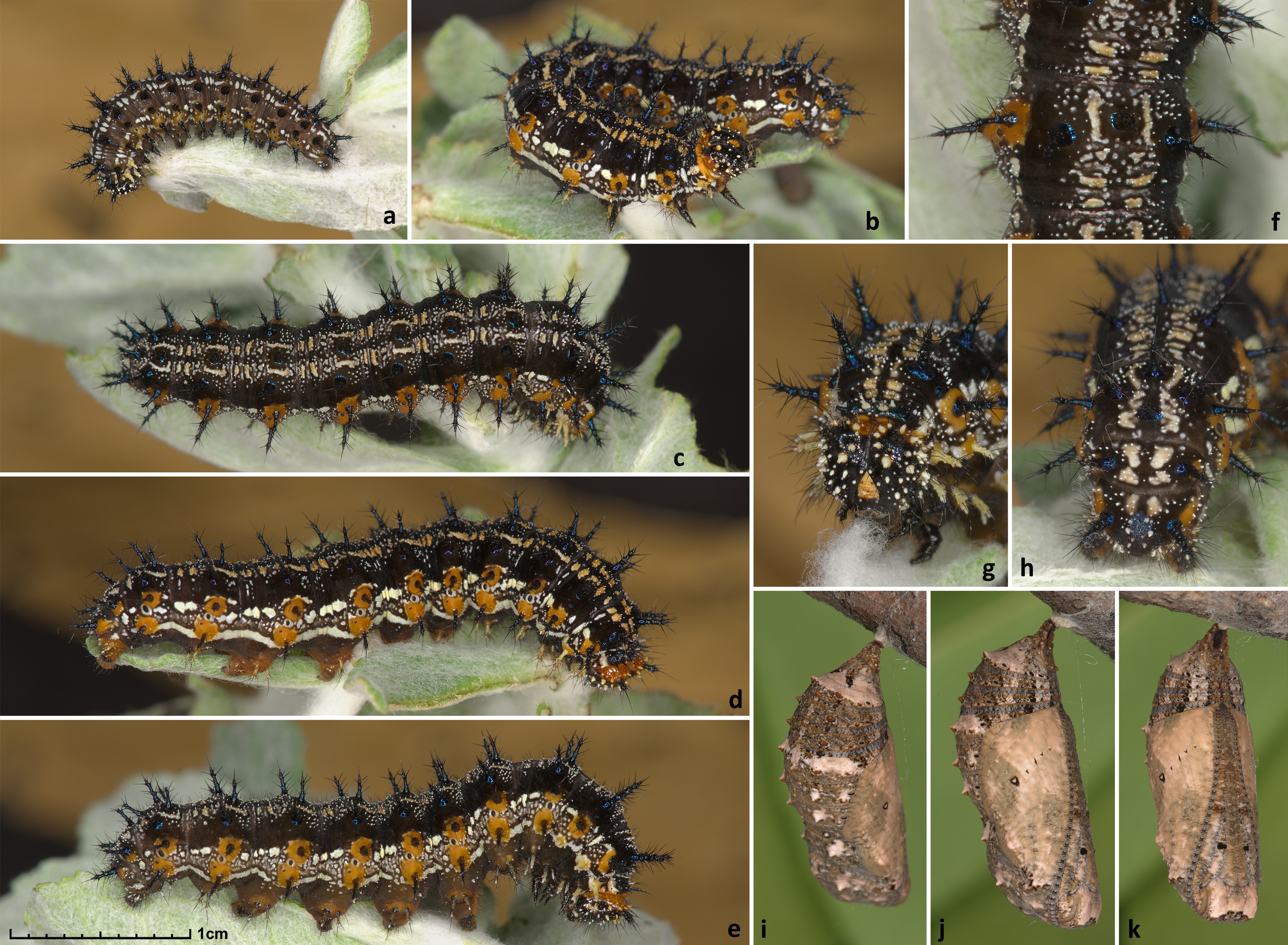
Caterpillars and pupa

Eggs are pale green and spherical with fine vertical ridges. Larvae hatch after approximately three days and pass through five instars. Early instars possess long black setae extending from dark scoli, while later instars develop white or tan spotting and increasingly broken stripe patterns along the body. Head coloration also changes markedly: third-instar larvae develop a pale triangular marking where the face forms, and by the fifth instar the upper head capsule becomes reddish with a contrasting pale area above the mouth that gives the impression of a face.

Larvae exhibit considerable color variability, ranging from brown to darker patterned forms, and the final instar is often heavily ornamented with white bumps and branched scoli. Pupae are mottled and cryptic, blending against the host plant. Some freshly emerged adults show a purple sheen on the forewings, a feature occasionally noted in the field.

== Distribution and habitat ==
Junonia stemosa is endemic to southern Texas, particularly along the Gulf Coast and on barrier islands such as South Padre Island. The species occurs in open coastal prairies, sandy flats, and meadow systems dominated by its larval host plant, Stemodia tomentosa, a perennial herb that thrives in dry, sandy soils near the coast. Individuals are often found flying in sympatry with two other buckeye species, Junonia coenia and Junonia nigrosuffusa, but maintain distinct ecological boundaries due to differences in host-plant use and adult phenotype.

The geographic distribution of J. stemosa appears to be shaped by the patchy distribution of S. tomentosa. This specialization limits the butterfly to coastal regions of southern Texas, where populations can be locally abundant in areas where the host plant is dominant.

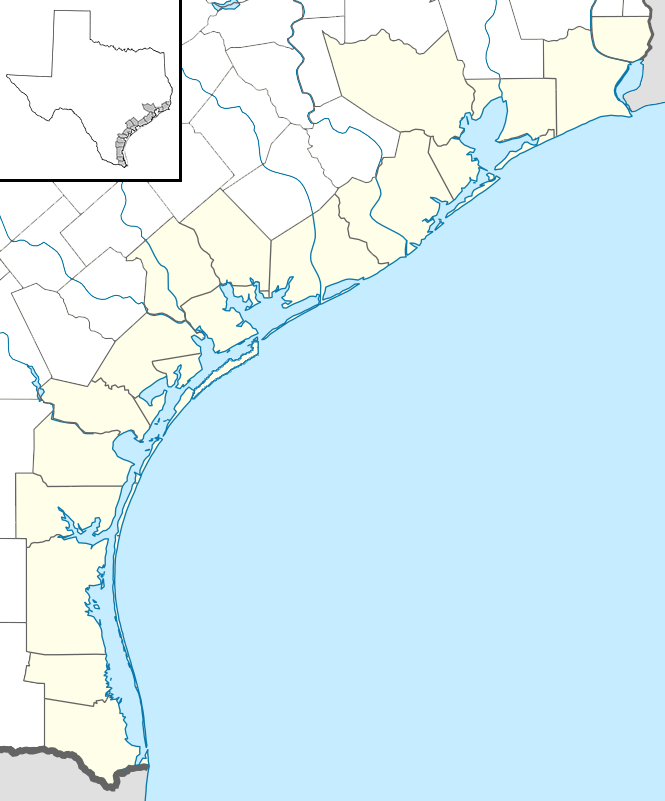
Gulf Coast in southern Texas

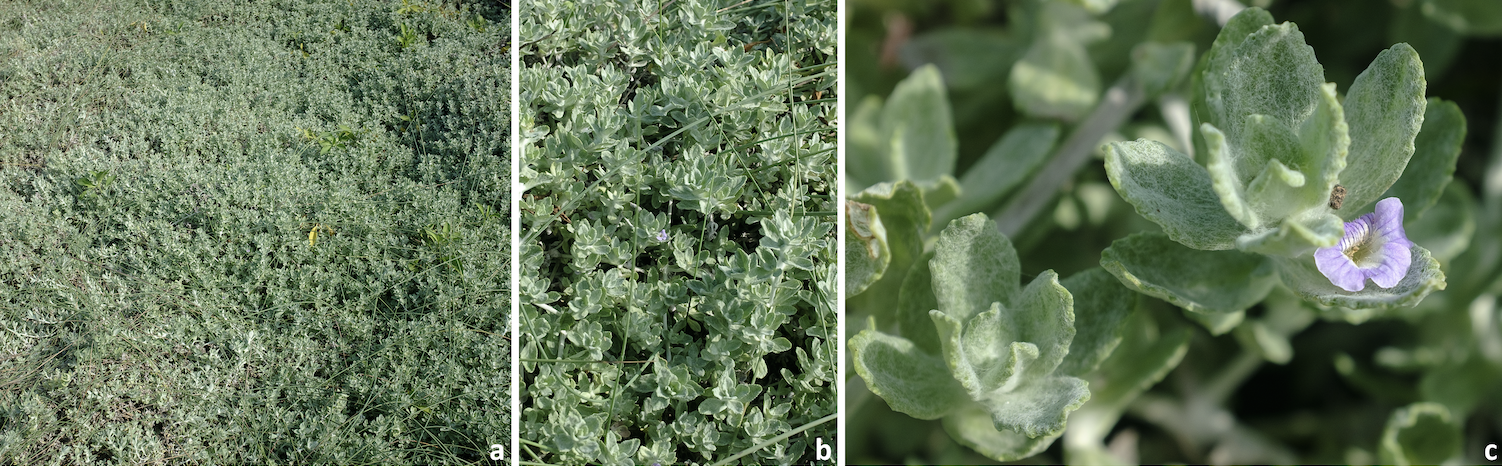
Stemodia tomentosa

== Ecology and life history ==
Larvae of Junonia stemosa feed exclusively on Stemodia tomentosa. This association is ecologically significant because the dense pubescence of S. tomentosa prevents feeding by Junonia coenia caterpillars, which normally refuse the plant and die in its absence. In contrast, J. stemosa larvae readily feed on it, reflecting an adaptation thought to contribute to the species' divergence from J. coenia.

Adults exhibit visually mediated mating preferences, with dark-winged individuals preferentially courting similarly patterned mates. Seasonal differences in host-plant persistence may also reinforce species boundaries: S. tomentosa persists year-round, allowing J. stemosa populations to remain stable through winter, whereas Agalinis, the primary host of J. coenia, dies back seasonally, reducing local J. coenia populations.

Despite evidence of hybridization across North American Junonia, genomic data show that J. stemosa maintains genetic integrity as a distinct species.

== Conservation status ==
Junonia stemosa has not yet been evaluated by the International Union for Conservation of Nature (IUCN). NatureServe currently lists the species as “Unranked”, indicating that it has not received a formal conservation status assessment.

Cong et al. (2020) report that the species has a relatively restricted distribution along the Texas Gulf Coast and relies on its larval host plant, Stemodia tomentosa, for development.
