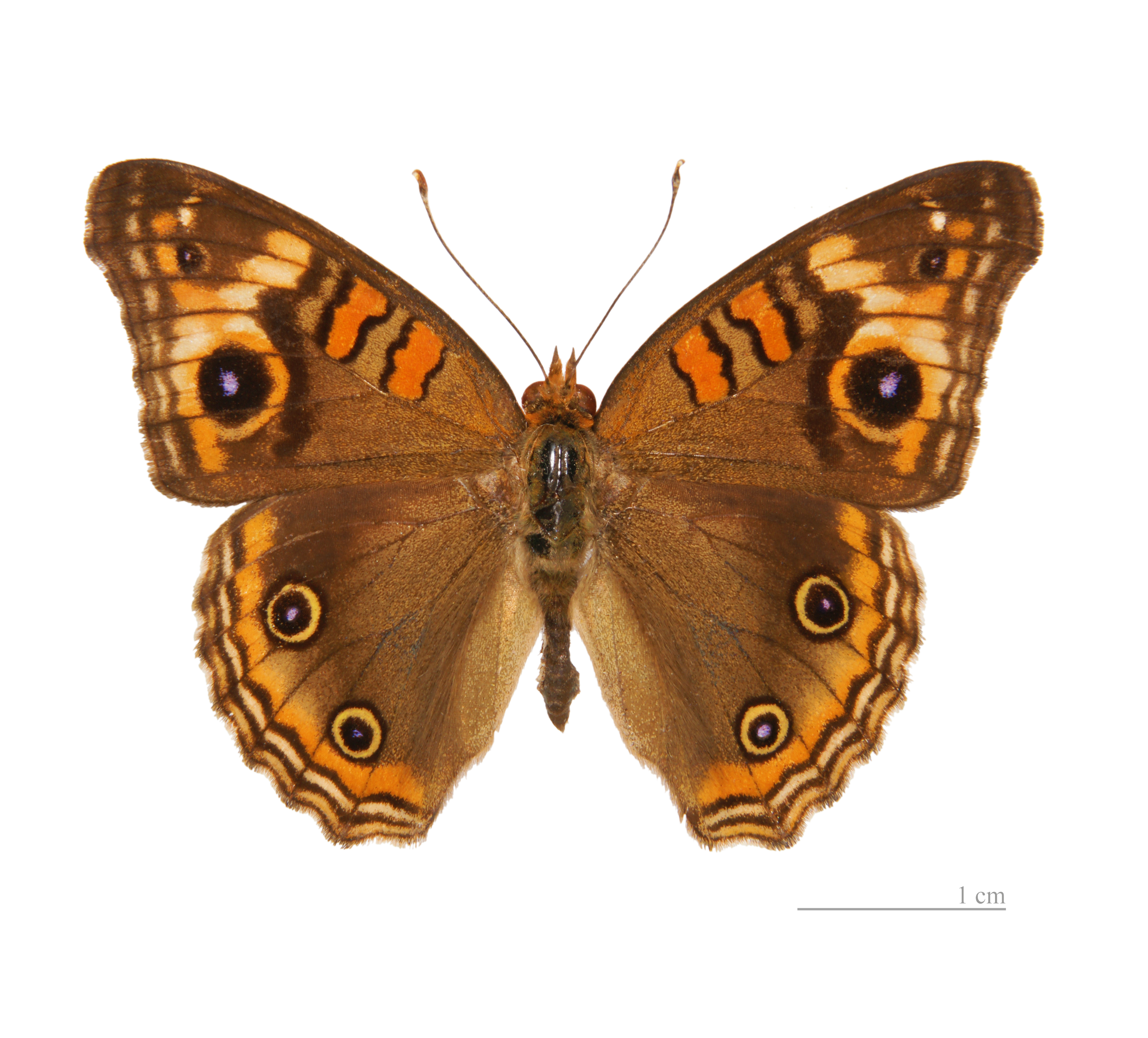
- dorsal side – French Guiana

Scientific classification
- Kingdom: Animalia
- Phylum: Arthropoda
- Clade: Pancrustacea
- Class: Insecta
- Order: Lepidoptera
- Family: Nymphalidae
- Genus: Junonia
- Species: J. evarete

Binomial name
- Junonia evarete (Cramer, [1779])

Synonyms
- Papilio lavinia Cramer, 1775; Papilio cortes Herbst, 1796; Papilio esra Fabricius, 1798; Junonia divaricata C. Felder & R. Felder, 1867; Junonia lavinia arenosa Forbes, [1929]; Junonia nigrosuffusa Barnes & McDunnough, 1916; and others

= Junonia evarete =

Tropical buckeye

Species of butterfly

Junonia evarete (Cramer, 1779), the tropical buckeye or South American tropical buckeye, is a South American butterfly of the nymphalid (Nymphalidae) family. It has characteristic eye spots on the wings, which have a wingspan between 4.5 and 6.5 cm (1.8 and 2.6 in). This butterfly is easily confused with Junonia genoveva, the mangrove buckeye. Not only have the common names mangrove and tropical buckeye been confused, but the butterflies themselves have been sometimes misidentified in past literature because the two species have many variations, subspecies and seasonal forms, which makes them difficult to identify or differentiate. Phylogenetic studies demonstrate the separation of evarete and genoveva, but evidence suggests that subspecies and perhaps more species await their descriptions within this group.

== Ecology ==
The tropical buckeye is found in tropical and subtropical South America. It inhabits tropical plains, shrub and scrub areas, islands, primary and secondary forests, and urbanized and suburbanized habitats. With a very fast and low flight, the tropical buckeye prefers open and sunny fields. Adults are nectarivores. Males generally stay in the vegetation or on the ground waiting for receptive females, sometimes all day long. The female deposits her eggs individually under the leaves of the host plant, preferably mock vervain (Glandularia carolinensis), Cayenne snakeweed (Stachytarpheta cayennensis) and white mangrove (Laguncularia racemosa).

== Systematics ==
Junonia nigrosuffusa and Junonia zonalis were formerly considered subspecies of Junonia evarete, but were elevated to species rank as a result of phylogenetic and DNA research. As a result, the geographic range of Junonia evarete is limited primarily to South America.
