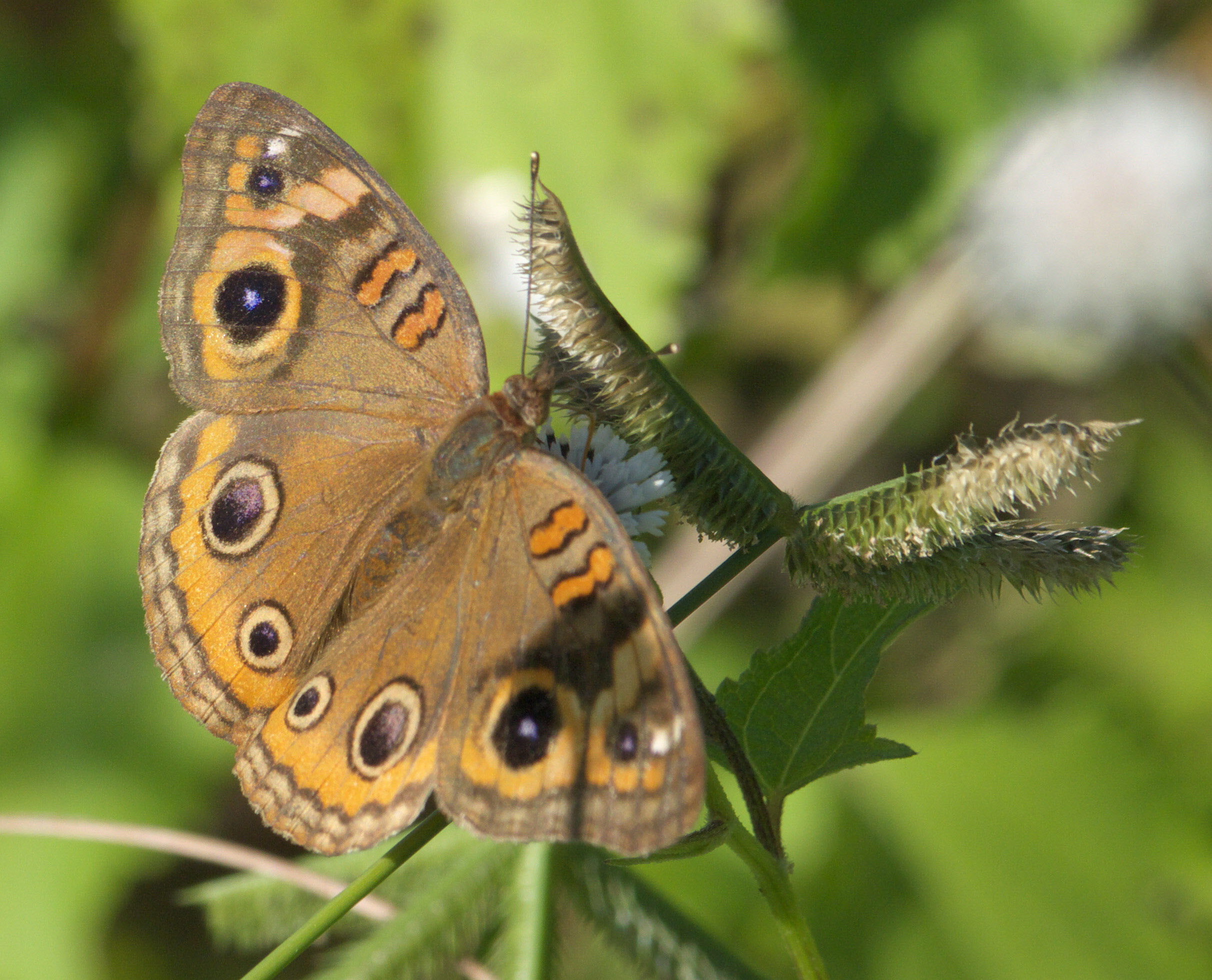
- Junonia neildi, West indian mangrove buckeye

Scientific classification
- Kingdom: Animalia
- Phylum: Arthropoda
- Class: Insecta
- Order: Lepidoptera
- Family: Nymphalidae
- Subfamily: Nymphalinae
- Tribe: Junoniini
- Genus: Junonia
- Species: J. neildi

Binomial name
- Junonia neildi Brévignon, 2004

= Junonia neildi =

Species of butterfly

Junonia neildi, the West indian mangrove buckeye, is a species in the butterfly family Nymphalidae.

This species was formerly a subspecies of Junonia genoveva. It is found in Florida, south Texas, Mexico, and the Caribbean. After its split from Junonia genoveva, Junonia genoveva are found primarily in South and Central America. The only members of the genus Junonia currently found in Florida are Junonia neildi, Junonia coenia, and Junonia zonalis.

== Subspecies ==
These subspecies belong to the species Junonia neildi:

- Junonia neildi neildi
- Junonia neildi varia - south Texas
