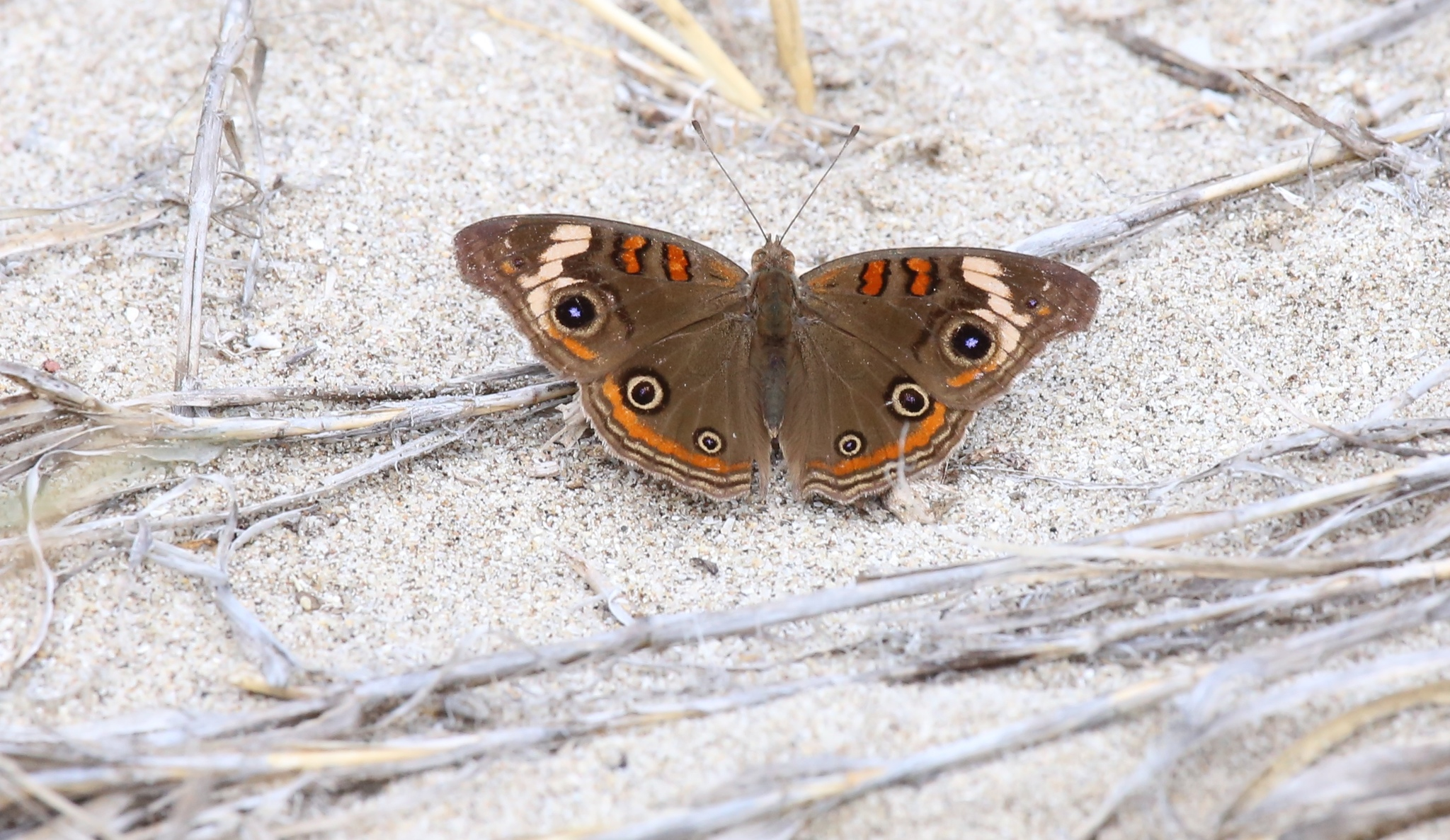
- Junonia pacoma, Pacific mangrove buckeye, México

Scientific classification
- Domain: Eukaryota
- Kingdom: Animalia
- Phylum: Arthropoda
- Class: Insecta
- Order: Lepidoptera
- Family: Nymphalidae
- Subfamily: Nymphalinae
- Tribe: Junoniini
- Genus: Junonia
- Species: J. pacoma

Binomial name
- Junonia pacoma Grishin, 2020

= Junonia pacoma =

Species of butterfly

Junonia pacoma, the Pacific mangrove buckeye, is a species in the butterfly family Nymphalidae described in 2020. It is found primarily in western Mexico.
