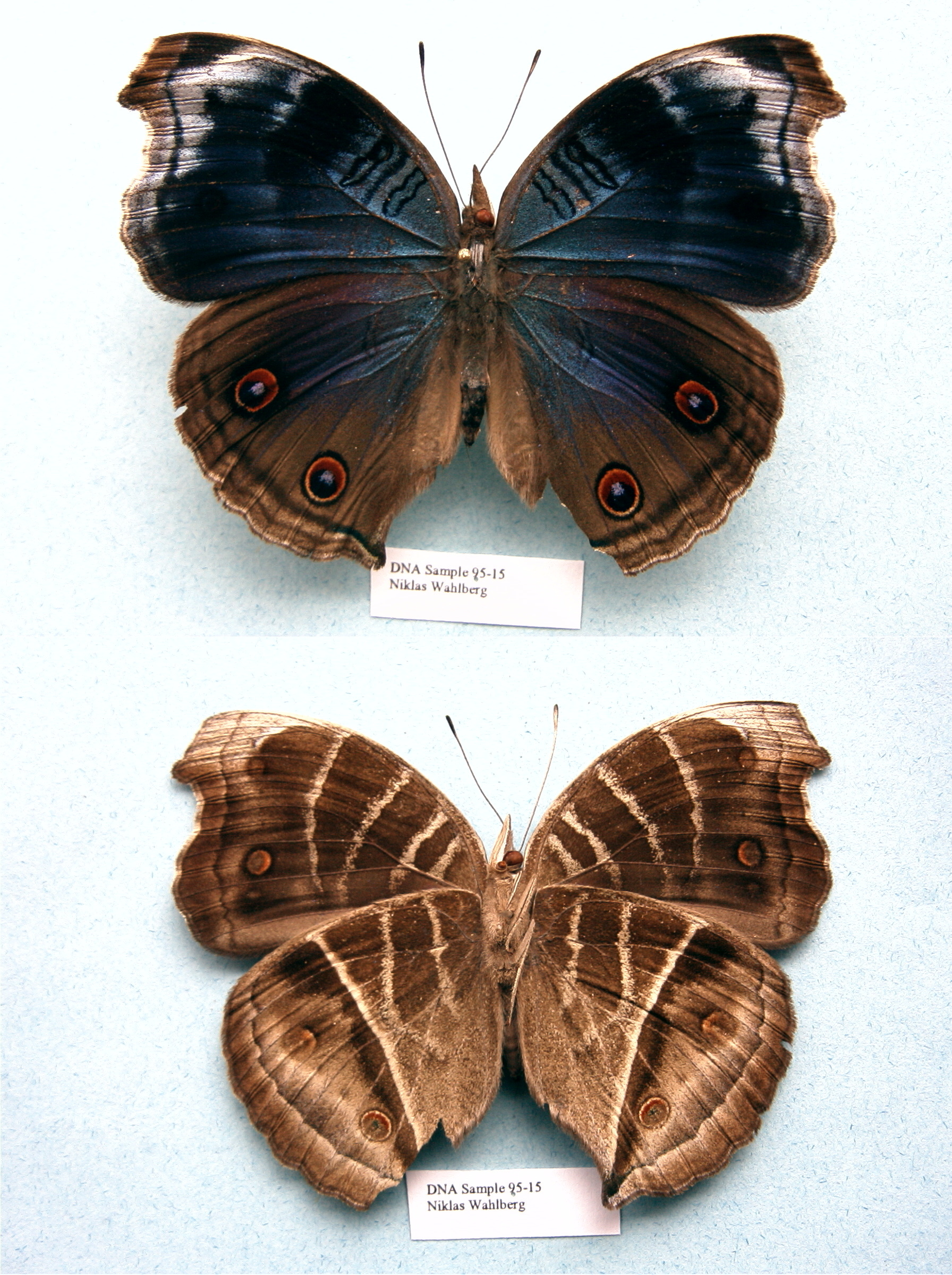

Scientific classification
- Kingdom: Animalia
- Phylum: Arthropoda
- Class: Insecta
- Order: Lepidoptera
- Family: Nymphalidae
- Genus: Junonia
- Species: J. touhilimasa

Binomial name
- Junonia touhilimasa Vuillot, 1892

Synonyms
- Junonia pavonina Butler, 1895; Precis touhilimasa f. obscurata Ball, 1932

= Junonia touhilimasa =

Naval pansy

Species of butterfly

Junonia touhilimasa, the naval pansy, is a butterfly in the family Nymphalidae. It is found in the Democratic Republic of the Congo (Shaba), south-western Tanzania, northern Zambia, and Zimbabwe. The habitat consists of Brachystegia woodland.

Adults are on wing year round. There are slightly different seasonal forms.

The larvae feed on Phaulopsis johnstonii.
