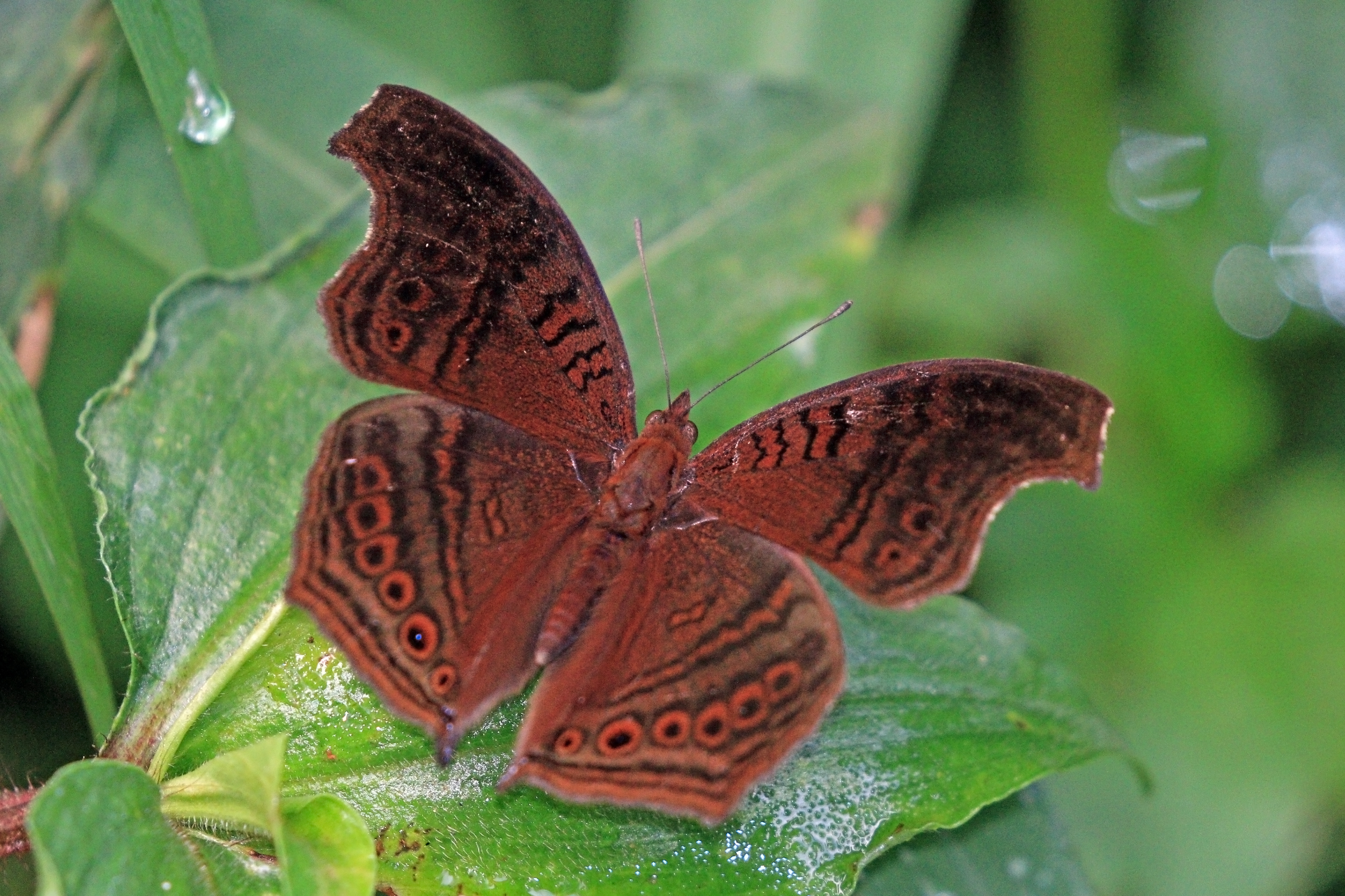
- In Uganda

Scientific classification
- Kingdom: Animalia
- Phylum: Arthropoda
- Clade: Pancrustacea
- Class: Insecta
- Order: Lepidoptera
- Family: Nymphalidae
- Genus: Junonia
- Species: J. stygia

Binomial name
- Junonia stygia (Aurivillius, 1894)

Synonyms
- Precis stygia Aurivillius, 1894; Precis stygia var. fuscata Holland, 1920; Precis stygia fuscata ab. alberici Dufrane, 1945

= Junonia stygia =

Species of butterfly

Junonia stygia, the brown pansy, dark pansy or Aurivillius' brown pansy, is a butterfly in the family Nymphalidae. It is found in Senegal, Guinea-Bissau, Guinea, Sierra Leone, Liberia, Ivory Coast, Ghana, Togo, Nigeria, Cameroon, Gabon, the Republic of the Congo, the Central African Republic, Angola and the Democratic Republic of the Congo. The habitat consists of forests, including disturbed areas and secondary forests.

The larvae feed on Paulowilhelmia sclerochiton, Asystasia, Barleria, Justicia, and Phaulopsis species.

Torben Larsen developed a species numbering system for his 2005 publication Butterflies of West Africa. This species is #820. The 'Larsen' numbers have since been used with permission in A Sharp Eye on Butterflies of Ghana.
