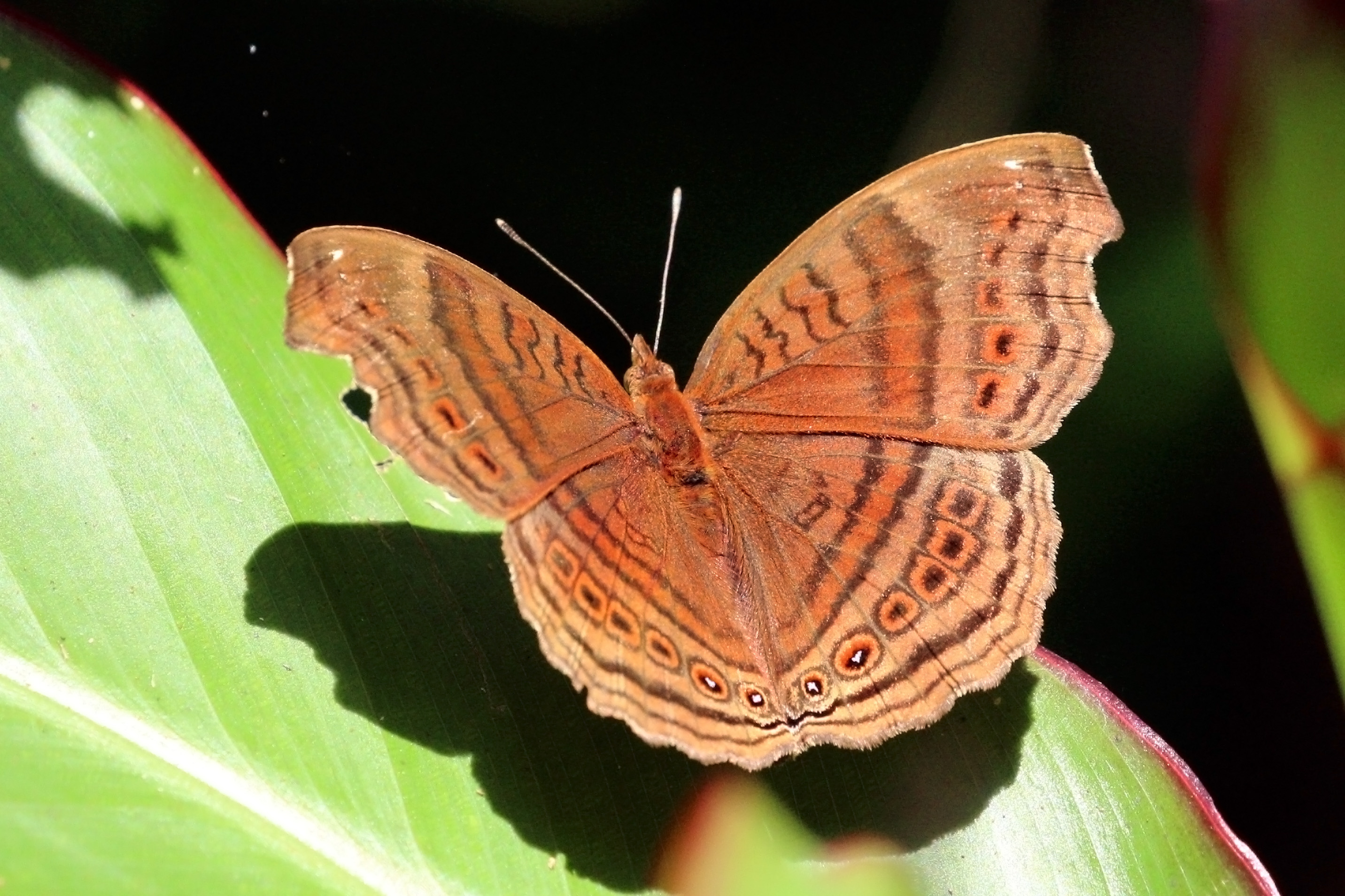
- Kibale National Park, Uganda

Scientific classification
- Domain: Eukaryota
- Kingdom: Animalia
- Phylum: Arthropoda
- Class: Insecta
- Order: Lepidoptera
- Family: Nymphalidae
- Genus: Junonia
- Species: J. gregorii

Binomial name
- Junonia gregorii Butler, 1896

Synonyms
- Junonia stygia gregorii Butler, 1896; Junonia gregori

= Junonia gregorii =

Species of butterfly

Junonia gregorii, or Gregori's brown pansy, is a butterfly in the family Nymphalidae. It is found in eastern Nigeria, Cameroon, Gabon, the Republic of the Congo, the Democratic Republic of the Congo, Uganda, western Tanzania and Kenya (the highlands on both sides of the Rift Valley). The habitat consists of edges of sub-montane forests and agricultural clearings.

The larvae feed on Phaulopsis parviflora and Sclerochiton paulowilhelmina.
