= Junonia schmiedeli =

Scientific classification
- Domain: Eukaryota
- Kingdom: Animalia
- Phylum: Arthropoda
- Class: Insecta
- Order: Lepidoptera
- Family: Nymphalidae
- Genus: Junonia
- Species: J. schmiedeli

Binomial name
- Junonia schmiedeli (Fiedler, 1920)

Synonyms
- Precis schmiedeli Fiedler, 1920

Species of butterfly

Junonia schmiedeli is a butterfly in the family Nymphalidae. It is found in Cameroon, the Democratic Republic of the Congo (Uele, Ituri, Kivu, Maniema, Sankuru, Lualaba), and Uganda.
