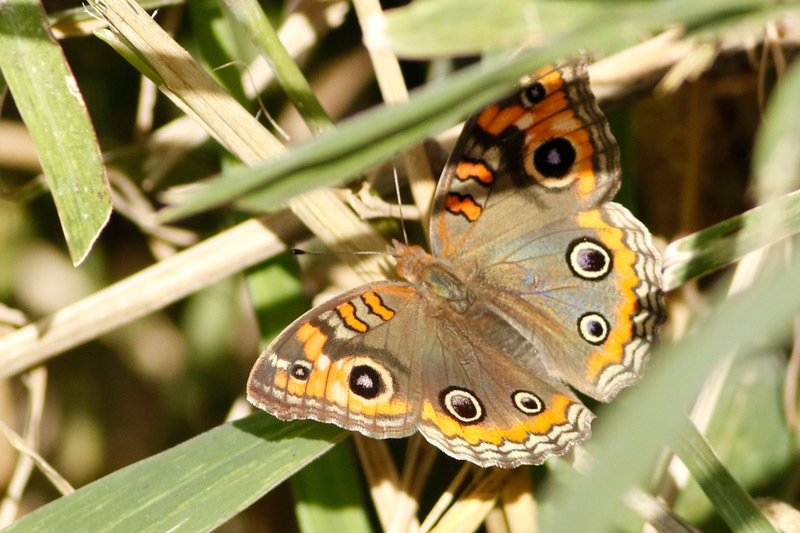
- Junonia genoveva, Argentina

Scientific classification
- Kingdom: Animalia
- Phylum: Arthropoda
- Clade: Pancrustacea
- Class: Insecta
- Order: Lepidoptera
- Family: Nymphalidae
- Genus: Junonia
- Species: J. genoveva

Binomial name
- Junonia genoveva (Cramer, [1780])

Synonyms
- Papilio genoveva Cramer, [1780]; Junonia constricta C. Felder & R. Felder, [1867]; Junonia hilaris C. Felder & R. Felder, [1867]; Junonia oriana Kirby, [1900]; Papilio cadmus Larrañaga, 1923 (preocc. Cramer, 1775); Junonia incarnata C. Felder & R. Felder, [1867]; Junonia infuscata C. Felder & R. Felder, [1867]; Junonia lavinia var. basifusca Weymer, 1890

= Junonia genoveva =

Species of butterfly

Junonia genoveva, the common mangrove buckeye or mangrove buckeye, is a butterfly of the family Nymphalidae. The species was first described by Pieter Cramer in 1780. It is found in South America and possibly into Central America. The wingspan is 45–57 mm.

The butterfly is easily confused with Junonia evarete, the tropical buckeye, also found in South America. Not only have the common names mangrove and tropical buckeye been confused, but the two species of butterflies themselves have been sometimes misidentified in past literature. Recent consensus designates Junonia genoveva the mangrove buckeye and Junonia evarete the tropical buckeye. Recent research and reclassification has determined that these species occur in South America.

The species Junonia neildi, the West Indian mangrove buckeye, was formerly considered a subspecies of Junonia genoveva. Its split from Junonia genoveva leaves Junonia genoveva as a South American species. The only members of the genus Junonia currently found in Florida are Junonia neildi, Junonia coenia, and Junonia zonalis.

With the reclassification of some Junonia species, the mangrove buckeye Junonia genoveva is confined primarily to South America, and is not found in North America or the Caribbean. The West Indian mangrove buckeye, Junonia neildi, is found in the West Indies, Florida, south Texas, and Mexico. The Pacific mangrove buckeye, Junonia pacoma, is found on the Pacific coast of Mexico. The South American mangrove buckeye, Junonia litoralis, is found along the coast of tropical South America and possibly into Central America.

Adults feed on flower nectar.

== Subspecies ==
- Junonia genoveva genoveva (Suriname)
- Junonia genoveva constricta (Venezuela, Colombia)
- Junonia genoveva hilaris (Paraguay, Uruguay, Argentina)
- Junonia genoveva incarnata (Colombia, Venezuela)
- Junonia genoveva infuscata (Ecuador)
- Junonia genoveva michaelisi (Central America, Honduras, Florida (US), Bahamas, Antilles, Puerto Rico)
- Junonia genoveva vivida (Guyana, Suriname)
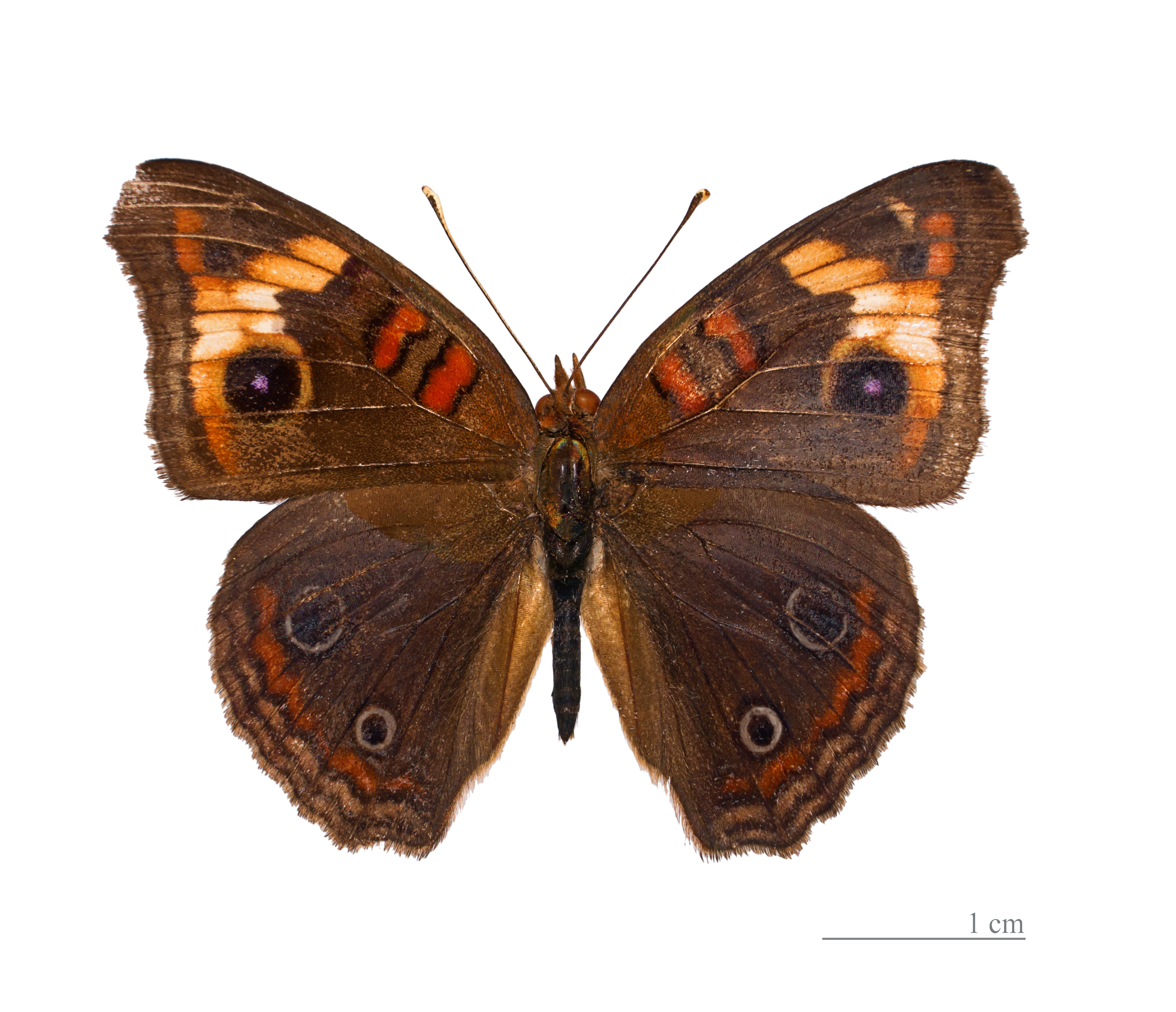
J. g. genoveva - MHNT

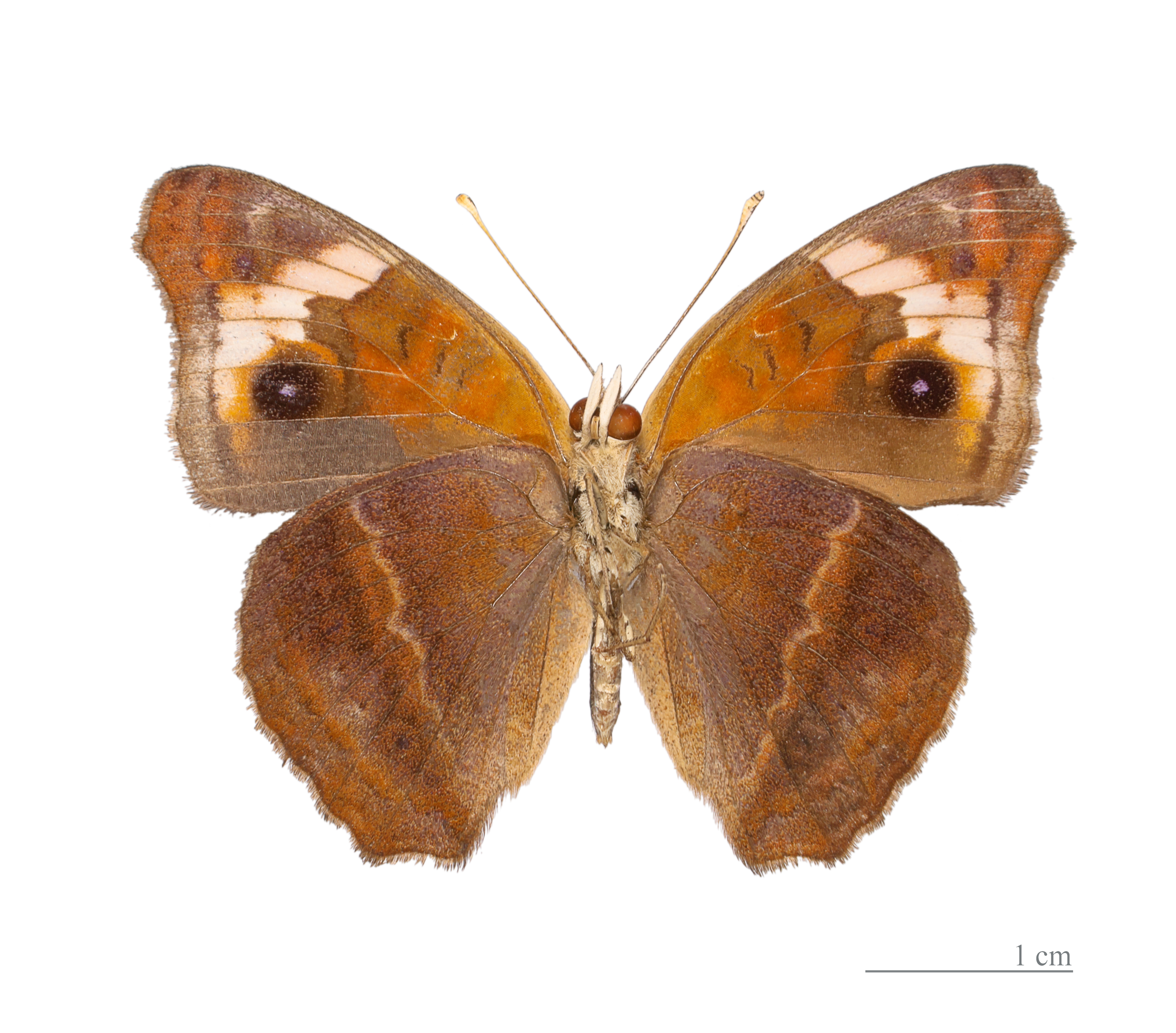
J. g. genoveva underside - MHNT
