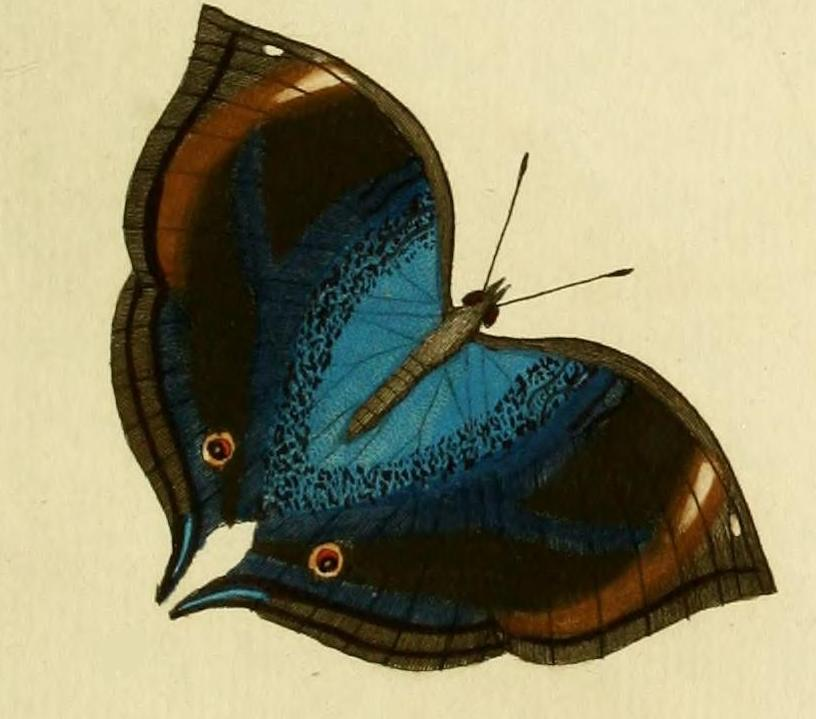

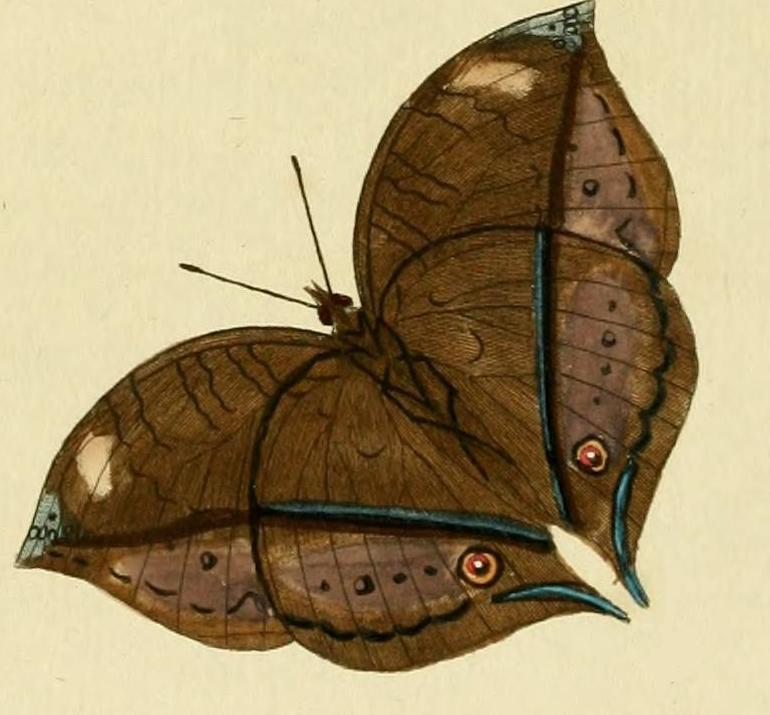

Scientific classification
- Kingdom: Animalia
- Phylum: Arthropoda
- Clade: Pancrustacea
- Class: Insecta
- Order: Lepidoptera
- Family: Nymphalidae
- Genus: Junonia
- Species: J. cymodoce

Binomial name
- Junonia cymodoce (Cramer, 1777)

Synonyms
- Papilio cymodoce Cramer, 1777; Kamilla cymodoce; Kallima cymodoce var. lugens Schultze, 1912

= Junonia cymodoce =

Species of butterfly

Junonia cymodoce, the blue leaf butterfly or blue leaf pansy, is a butterfly in the family Nymphalidae. It is found in Guinea, Ivory Coast, Ghana, Togo, Benin, Nigeria, Cameroon, Equatorial Guinea, São Tomé and Príncipe, the Republic of the Congo, Angola, the Central African Republic, the Democratic Republic of the Congo, western Uganda, western Tanzania and north-western Zambia. The habitat consists of lowland forests.

The larvae feed on Ruellia species and Asystasia gangetica.

== Subspecies ==
- Junonia cymodoce cymodoce (Guinea, Ivory Coast, Ghana, Togo, Benin, Nigeria)
- Junonia cymodoce lugens (Schultze, 1912) (Cameroon, Bioko, São Tomé and Príncipe (Príncipe), Congo, Angola, Central African Republic, Democratic Republic of the Congo, western Uganda, western Tanzania, north-western Zambia)

Torben Larsen developed a species numbering system for his 2005 publication Butterflies of West Africa. The nominate subspecies is #816. The 'Larsen' numbers have since been used with permission in A Sharp Eye on Butterflies of Ghana.
