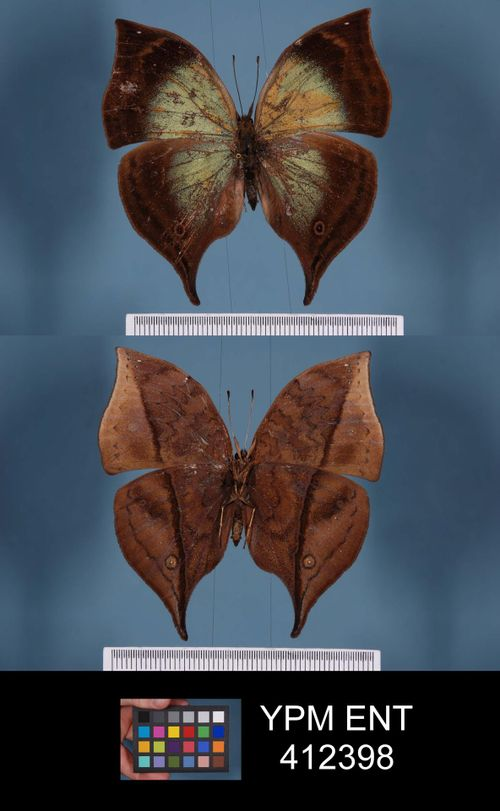

Scientific classification
- Kingdom: Animalia
- Phylum: Arthropoda
- Class: Insecta
- Order: Lepidoptera
- Family: Nymphalidae
- Genus: Junonia
- Species: J. ansorgei

Binomial name
- Junonia ansorgei (Rothschild, 1899)

Synonyms
- Kallima ansorgei Rothschild, 1899; Kallima incerta Grünberg, 1908

= Junonia ansorgei =

Species of butterfly

Junonia ansorgei, or Ansorge's leaf butterfly, is a butterfly in the family Nymphalidae. It is found in Cameroon, the eastern part of the Democratic Republic of the Congo, southern Ethiopia, Uganda, western Kenya, western Tanzania and Zambia. It is generally found in dense forests.
