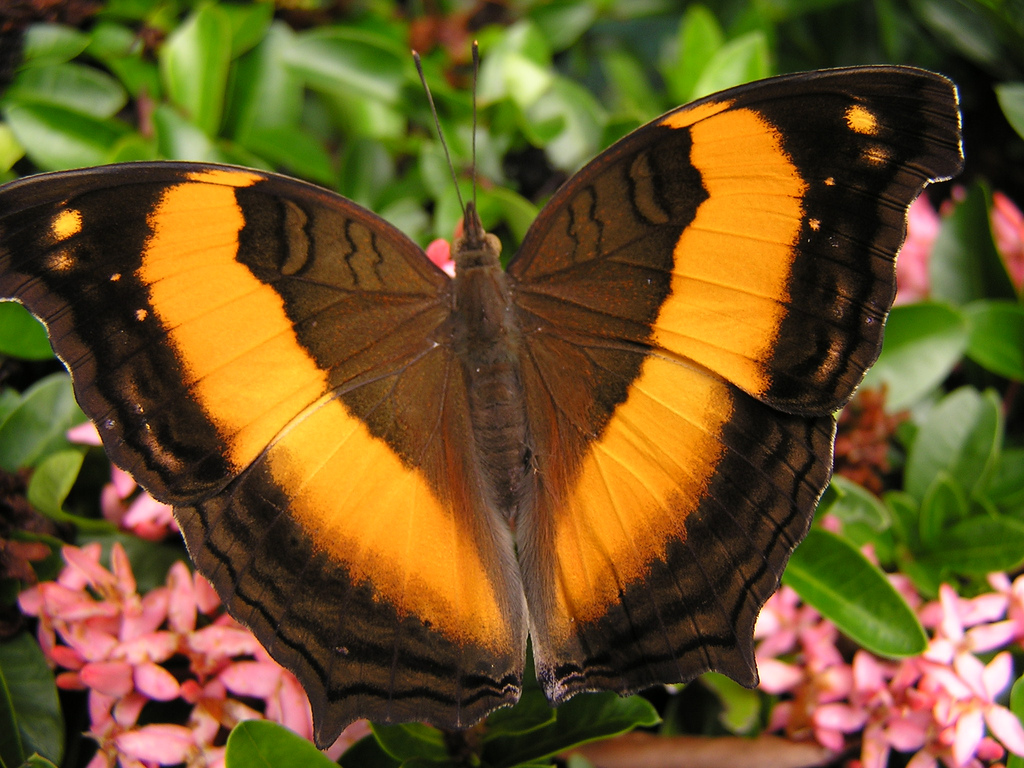
- Yoma sabina

Scientific classification
- Domain: Eukaryota
- Kingdom: Animalia
- Phylum: Arthropoda
- Class: Insecta
- Order: Lepidoptera
- Family: Nymphalidae
- Tribe: Junoniini
- Genus: Yoma; Doherty, 1886

Species
- See text

= Yoma (butterfly) =

Genus of butterflies

Yoma is a genus of nymphalid butterflies.

== Species ==
In alphabetical order:

- Yoma algina (Boisduval, 1832) (New Guinea and surrounding islands)
- Yoma sabina (Cramer, [1780]) – Australian lurcher (widespread from Southeast Asia to Australia)
