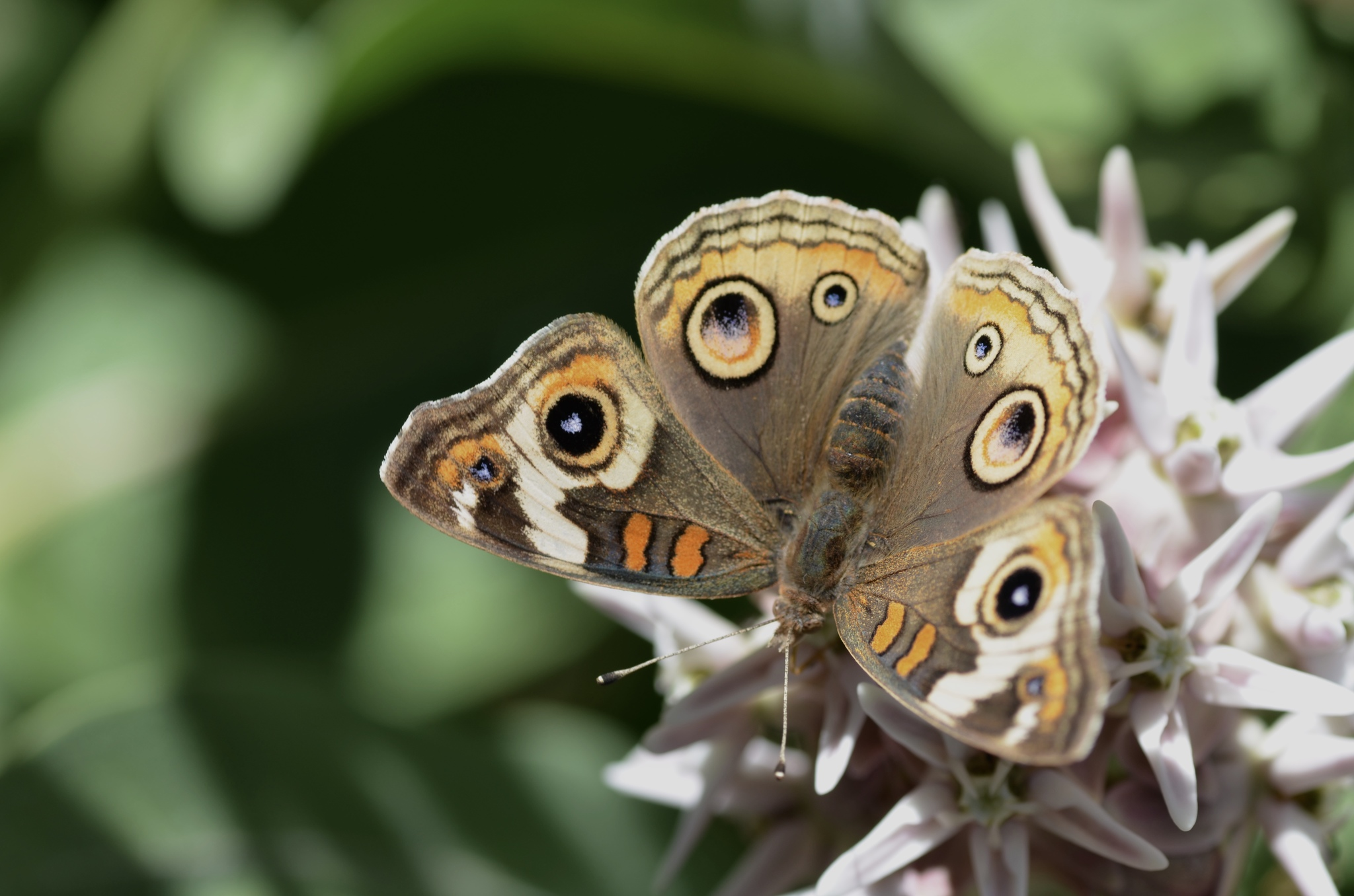
- Junonia grisea, gray buckeye, California

Scientific classification
- Domain: Eukaryota
- Kingdom: Animalia
- Phylum: Arthropoda
- Class: Insecta
- Order: Lepidoptera
- Family: Nymphalidae
- Subfamily: Nymphalinae
- Tribe: Junoniini
- Genus: Junonia
- Species: J. grisea

Binomial name
- Junonia grisea Austin & Emmel, 1998

= Junonia grisea =

Species of butterfly

Junonia grisea, also known as the gray buckeye, grey buckeye, or Western buckeye, is a species in the butterfly family Nymphalidae. It is found in North America, west of the Rocky Mountains. Like the common buckeye, the gray buckeye is a brown butterfly with eyespots on its wings that distract predators from its body.

Junonia grisea was formerly considered a subspecies of the common buckeye, Junonia coenia, called Junonia coenia grisea. The gray buckeye's status as a separate species was discovered in 2018 by Dr. Jeffrey Marcus, an entomologist at the University of Manitoba, and Melanie Lalonde, a graduate student.
