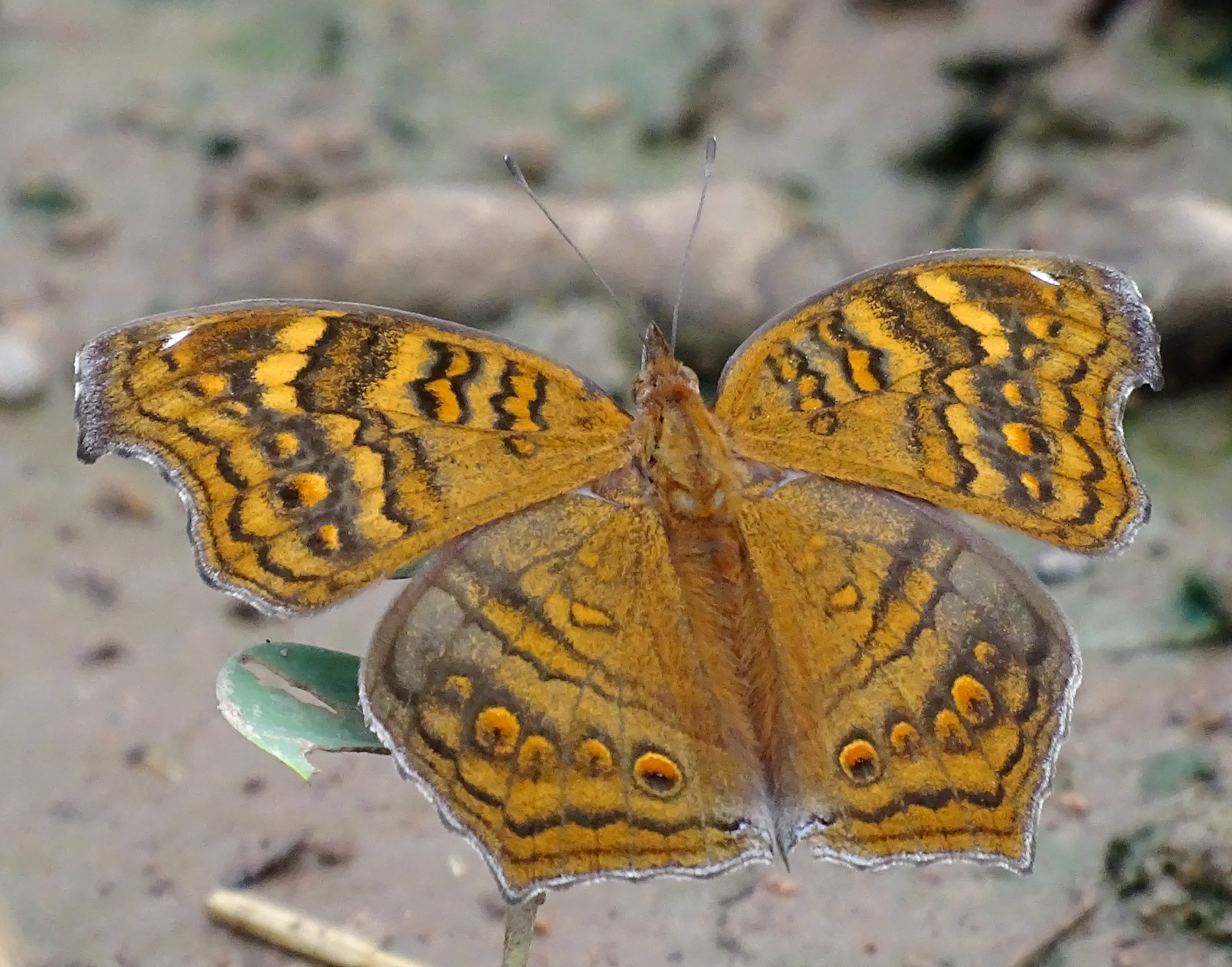
- In Benin

Scientific classification
- Kingdom: Animalia
- Phylum: Arthropoda
- Clade: Pancrustacea
- Class: Insecta
- Order: Lepidoptera
- Family: Nymphalidae
- Genus: Junonia
- Species: J. chorimene

Binomial name
- Junonia chorimene (Guérin-Méneville, 1844)

Synonyms
- Vanessa chorimene Guérin-Méneville, 1844; Vanessa orthosia Klug, 1845; Salamis ethyra Feisthamel, 1850; Precis chorimene f. angulata Aurivillius, 1913

= Junonia chorimene =

Golden pansy

Species of butterfly

Junonia chorimene, the golden pansy, is a butterfly in the family Nymphalidae. It is found in Senegal, the Gambia, Guinea-Bissau, Guinea, Mali, Sierra Leone, Ivory Coast, Burkina Faso, Ghana, Togo, Benin, Nigeria, the Democratic Republic of the Congo (Uele, Ituri, Kivu and Lualaba), Sudan, Ethiopia, Uganda, northern and western Kenya, northern Tanzania, south-western Arabia and Yemen. The habitat consists of riverine vegetation.

The larvae feed on Asystasia schimperi, Justicia leikepiensis, Barleria, Hypoestes, Paulowilhelmia and Ruellia species.

Torben Larsen developed a species numbering system for his 2005 publication Butterflies of West Africa. This species is #822. The 'Larsen' numbers have since been used with permission in A Sharp Eye on Butterflies of Ghana.
