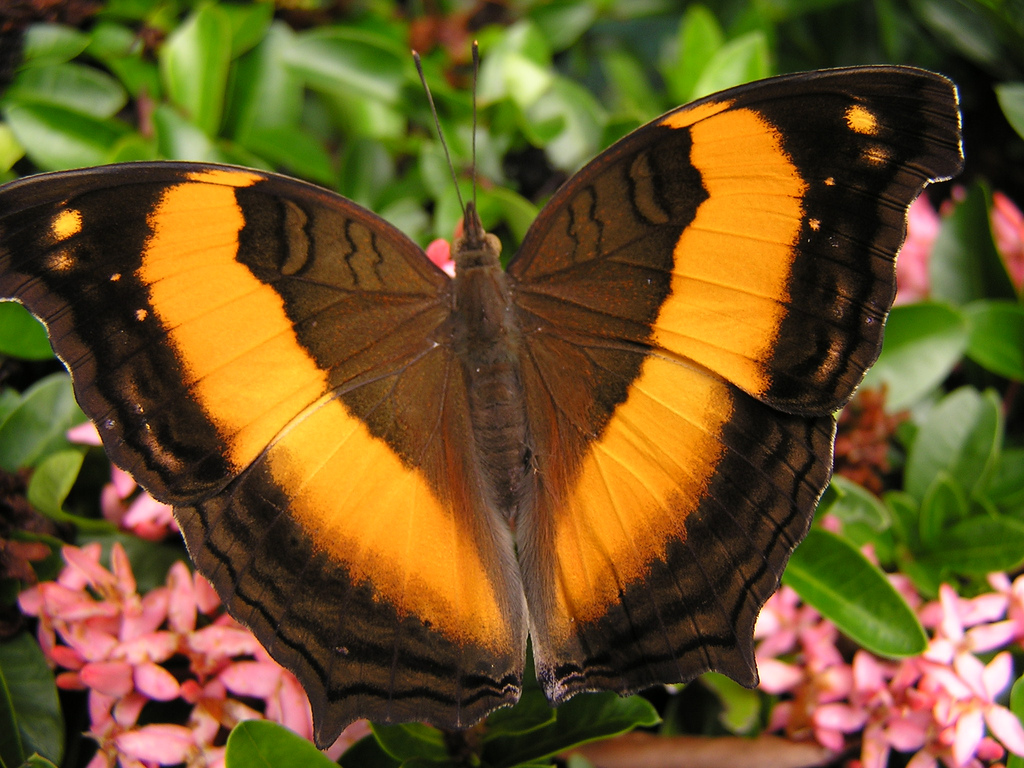

Scientific classification
- Domain: Eukaryota
- Kingdom: Animalia
- Phylum: Arthropoda
- Class: Insecta
- Order: Lepidoptera
- Family: Nymphalidae
- Genus: Yoma
- Species: Y. sabina

Binomial name
- Yoma sabina (Cramer, 1780)

Synonyms
- Papilio sabina Cramer 1780

= Yoma sabina =

Australian lurcher

Species of butterfly

Yoma sabina, the Australian lurcher, is a species of butterfly in the family Nymphalidae. It is found in the northern Australasian realm and in Southeast Asia.

The wingspan is around 7 cm.

The larvae feed on Dipteracanthus bracteatus and Ruellia species (wild petunias).

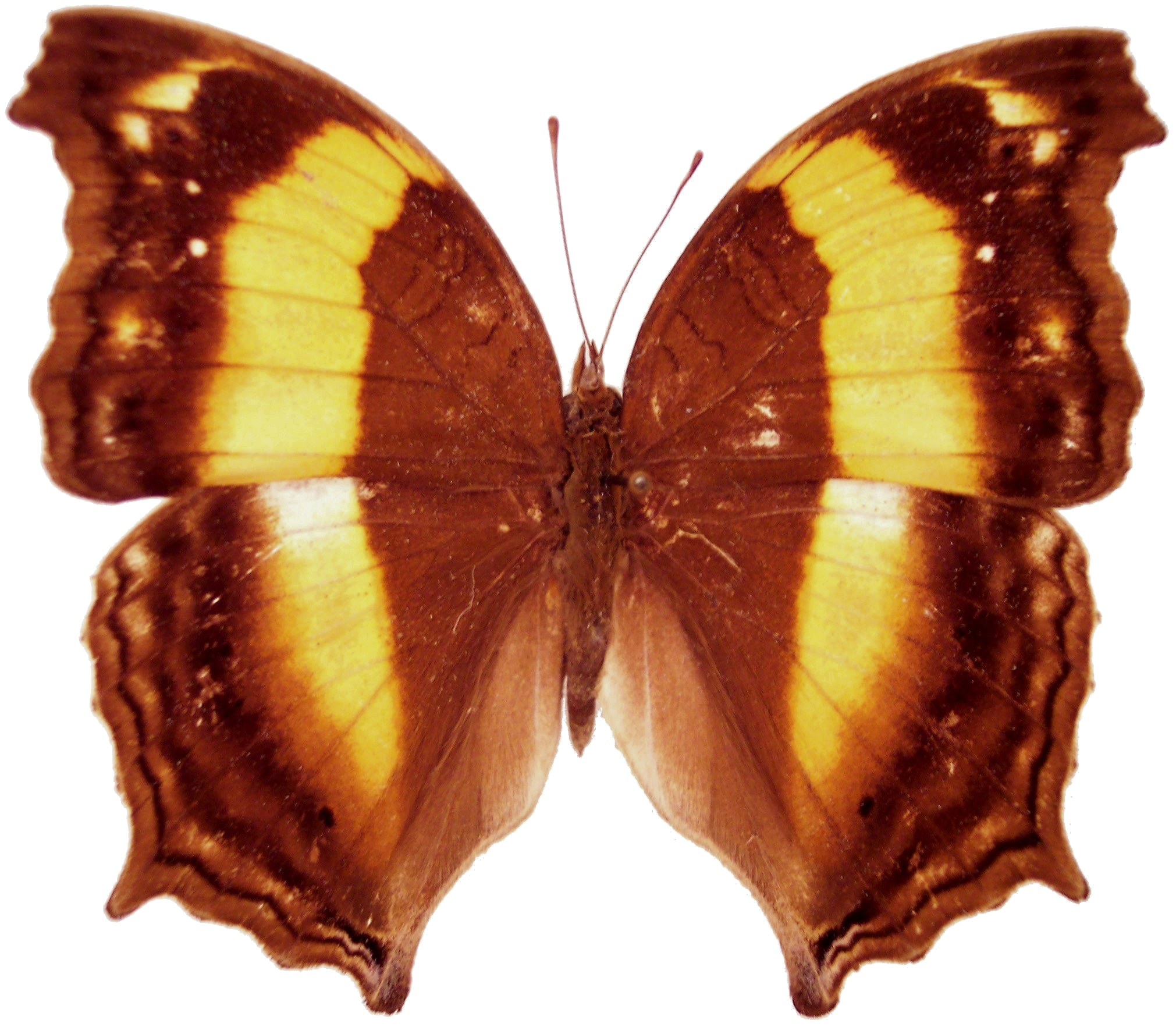
Yoma sabina vasuki from Taiwan
