= Junonia africana =

Scientific classification
- Kingdom: Animalia
- Phylum: Arthropoda
- Class: Insecta
- Order: Lepidoptera
- Family: Nymphalidae
- Genus: Junonia
- Species: J. africana

Binomial name
- Junonia africana (Richelmann, 1913)

Synonyms
- Precis africana Richelmann, 1913

Species of butterfly

Junonia africana is a butterfly in the family Nymphalidae. It is found in Cameroon.
