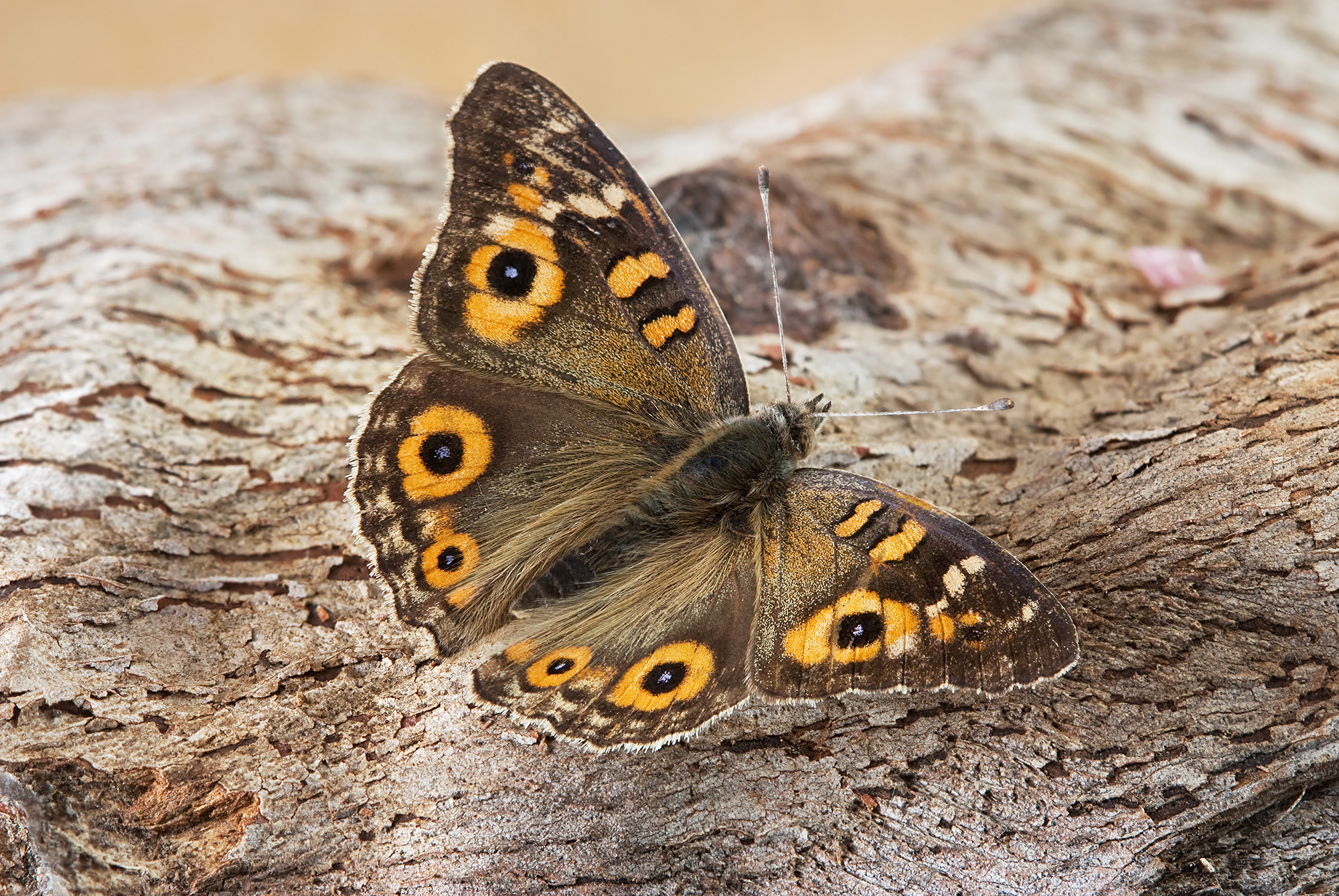
- Junonia villida

Scientific classification
- Kingdom: Animalia
- Phylum: Arthropoda
- Clade: Pancrustacea
- Class: Insecta
- Order: Lepidoptera
- Family: Nymphalidae
- Tribe: Junoniini
- Genus: Junonia; Hübner, [1819]

Type species
- Junonia evarete (Cramer, 1779)

Species
- Around 40, see text

Synonyms
- Alcyoneis Hübner, [1819]; Aresta Billberg, 1820; Kamilla Collins & Larsen, 1991

= Junonia =

Genus of butterflies

Junonia is a genus of nymphalid butterflies, described by Jacob Hübner in 1819. They are commonly known as buckeyes, pansies or commodores. This genus flies on every continent except Antarctica and Europe. The genus contains roughly 30 to 35 species.

== Description ==
These butterflies are medium to large (wingspan 40–110 mm). The ground colour is brown or grey suffused blue. Spots on the wings are orange, blue or pink and sometimes large. Many of the species can occur in several colour forms. The head is of moderate size with smooth, prominent eyes. The palpi are rather long, sharply pointed, ascending, generally convergent and scaly, sometimes more or less hairy. The antennae are of moderate length, generally with a rather short, abruptly formed club. The thorax is robust, ovate, rather sparingly clothed with hairs. The wing characters are: large, broad, variable in outline. Forewing: costa more or less arched, sometimes very strongly so; apical portion more or less produced, sometimes very prominent, with a strong projection on the hind margin at the extremity of the first discoidal nervule; hind margin always more or less dentate and emarginate, with, in many species, a considerable projection at extremity of third median nervule; inner margin nearly straight, or slightly emarginate about centre; discoidal cell generally closed by a slender nervule. Hindwing: costa strongly arched at base, and more or less so throughout; hind margin always more or less scalloped, sometimes simply rounded (without any marked projections), sometimes with a more or less elongate production of anal angle, and occasionally with a longer or shorter projection of hind margin at extremity of first median nervule; inner margins deeply grooved and entirely covering the under surface of the abdomen; discoidal cell generally open. The abdomen short, compressed, rather slender.

The larvae are rather stout, almost of equal thickness throughout, armed with strong branched spines; sometimes with two short, similar spines on head. The pupae are moderately angulated, with raised tubercles on the back, head slightly bifid. Sometimes hardly angulated, the anterior portions more rounded.

== Biology ==
Junonia are good fliers. The larvae feed on a wide variety of plants, among others Labiatae, Acanthaceae, Amaranthaceae, Scrophulariaceae, Onagraceae, Leguminosae, Balsaminaceae, Gramineae, Melastomataceae, Plantaginaceae, Aucubaceae and Compositae. The species found in South India generally show very sensitive behaviour.

== Taxonomy ==
The leaf butterflies J. ansorgei and J. cymodoce (both from Africa) have traditionally been included in Kallima, but this genus is now usually limited to Asian species. Instead of being placed in Junonia, the two are sometimes awarded their own genus, Kallima. The leaf butterfly J. tugela is sometimes included in Precis instead of Junonia.

Recent phylogenetic and DNA research resulted some subspecies being elevated to species rank, along with some new species descriptions. Currently, the species Junonia divaricata, Junonia evarete, Junonia genoveva, and Junonia litoralis are restricted to South America. Six species are present in the United States: Junonia coenia, Junonia grisea, Junonia neildi, Junonia nigrosuffusa, Junonia stemosa, and Junonia zonalis.

The species in Junonia:

Caterpillar	Butterfly	Scientific name	Common name	Distribution
		Junonia adulatrix (Fruhstorfer, 1903)		Sumba, Indonesia
		Junonia africana (Richelmann, 1913)		Cameroon
		Junonia almana (Linnaeus, 1758)	peacock pansy	Southeast and South Asia
		Junonia ansorgei (Rothschild, 1899)	Ansorge's leaf butterfly	Cameroon, the eastern part of the Democratic Republic of the Congo, southern Ethiopia, Uganda, western Kenya, western Tanzania and Zambia.
		Junonia artaxia Hewitson, 1864	commodore	eastern Angola, the Democratic Republic of the Congo (Lomami, Kabinda, Lualaba, Shaba and Tanganika) Burundi, Kenya, southern and western Tanzania, Zambia, Malawi, Mozambique and Zimbabwe.
		Junonia atlites (Linnaeus, 1763)	grey pansy or gray pansy	India, southern China, Cambodia, Indochina, the Malay Peninsula, western and central Indonesia, and the Philippines.
		Junonia chorimene (Guérin-Méneville, [1844])	golden pansy	Senegal, the Gambia, Guinea-Bissau, Guinea, Mali, Sierra Leone, Ivory Coast, Burkina Faso, Ghana, Togo, Benin, Nigeria, the Democratic Republic of the Congo (Uele, Ituri, Kivu and Lualaba), Sudan, Ethiopia, Uganda, northern and western Kenya, northern Tanzania, south-western Arabia and Yemen.
		Junonia coenia Hübner, [1822]	(common) buckeye	Southern Canada, United States, Bermuda, Cuba, Mexico
		Junonia cytora Doubleday, 1847 (formerly Salamis cytora)	western blue beauty	Guinea, Sierra Leone, Liberia, Ivory Coast, Ghana, Togo, and Benin
		Junonia cymodoce (Cramer, [1777])	western leaf, blue leaf butterfly	Guinea, Ivory Coast, Ghana, Togo, Benin, Nigeria, Cameroon, Equatorial Guinea, São Tomé and Príncipe, the Republic of the Congo, Angola, the Central African Republic, the Democratic Republic of the Congo, western Uganda, western Tanzania and north-western Zambia
		Junonia divaricata C. & R. Felder, [1867]		Suriname, French Guiana
		Junonia elgiva (Druce, 1773)	southern soldier pansy	Kenya, Tanzania, Angola, Democratic Republic of Congo, Malawi, Zambia, Mozambique, Zimbabwe, South Africa, Swaziland
		Junonia erigone (Cramer, [1775])	northern argus	Indonesia, New Guinea
		Junonia evarete (Cramer, [1779])		South & Central America, Caribbean
		Junonia genoveva (Cramer, [1780])		Central America, Honduras, United States (Florida), Bahamas, Antilles, Colombia, Venezuela, Ecuador, Guyana, Suriname, Paraguay, Uruguay
		Junonia goudotii (Boisduval, 1833)		Madagascar, the Comoros and Mauritius
		Junonia gregorii Butler, [1896]	Gregori's brown pansy	eastern Nigeria, Cameroon, Gabon, the Republic of the Congo, the Democratic Republic of the Congo, Uganda, western Tanzania and Kenya
		Junonia grisea Austin & Emmel, 1998	gray buckeye	western North America
		Junonia hadrope Doubleday, [1847]	Volta pansy	Ghana (the Volta Region)
		Junonia hedonia (Linnaeus, 1764)	brown pansy	Southeast Asia, Indonesia, and Australia.
		Junonia hierta (Fabricius, 1798)	yellow pansy	Southwestern China, South and Southeast Asia, Sub-Saharan Africa, Madagascar, Arabia
		Junonia intermedia (C. & R. Felder, [1867])	Sulawesi Chocolate Pansy	Sulawesi
		Junonia iphita (Cramer, [1779])	chocolate pansy	Asia
		Junonia lemonias (Linnaeus, 1758)	lemon pansy	Cambodia and South Asia
		Junonia litoralis Brévignon, 2009	Chocolate pansy	South America
		Junonia natalica (Felder, 1860)	Natal pansy	Angola, south-eastern Democratic Republic of the Congo, Burundi, Kenya, Tanzania, Pemba Island, Malawi, Zambia, Mozambique, Zimbabwe, northern Botswana, Namibia(Caprivi, Swaziland), South Africa (Limpopo, Mpumalanga, KwaZulu-Natal, Eastern Cape)
		Junonia neildi Brévignon, 2004	mangrove buckeye	Florida, south Texas, Mexico, and the Caribbean
		Junonia nigrosuffusa Barnes & McDunnough, 1916	dark buckeye	southwestern United States and Mexico.
		Junonia oenone (Linnaeus, 1758)	dark blue pansy	Madagascar, Aldabra, Astove, Assumption and Cosmoledo Island.
		Junonia orithya (Linnaeus, 1758)	eyed pansy or blue pansy	South and southeast Asia, Australia
		Junonia pacoma Grishin, 2020	Pacific mangrove buckeye	western Mexico.
		Junonia rhadama (Boisduval, 1833)	brilliant blue	Madagascar, Mauritius, Rodrigues, Réunion, the Comoros, and the Seychelles (Astove Island).
		Junonia schmiedeli (Fiedler, 1920)		Cameroon, the Democratic Republic of the Congo (Uele, Ituri, Kivu, Maniema, Sankuru, Lualaba), and Uganda
		Junonia sophia (Fabricius, 1793)	little commodore	Senegal, the Gambia, Guinea-Bissau, Guinea, Sierra Leone, Liberia, Ivory Coast, Burkina Faso, Ghana, Togo, Nigeria, Cameroon, Angola, the Democratic Republic of the Congo, Uganda, Rwanda, Burundi, Kenya, Ethiopia, Tanzania, Malawi, and Zambia.
		Junonia stemosa Grishin, 2020	twintip buckeye	Texas, northern Mexico
		Junonia stygia (Aurivillius, 1894)	brown pansy or dark pansy	Senegal, Guinea-Bissau, Guinea, Sierra Leone, Liberia, Ivory Coast, Ghana, Togo, Nigeria, Cameroon, Gabon, the Republic of the Congo, the Central African Republic, Angola and the Democratic Republic of the Congo.
		Junonia terea (Drury, 1773)	soldier commodore or soldier pansy	Senegal, the Gambia, Guinea-Bissau, Guinea, Sierra Leone, Liberia, Ivory Coast, Burkina Faso, Ghana, Togo, Benin, Nigeria, Cameroon, Gabon, Congo, Democratic Republic of the Congo, western Kenya, Ethiopia, Somalia, Sudan, Uganda, central Kenya, north-western Tanzania,
		Junonia timorensis Wallace, 1869		Sumba, Indonesia
		Junonia touhilimasa Vuillot, 1892	naval pansy	Democratic Republic of the Congo (Shaba), south-western Tanzania, northern Zambia, and Zimbabwe.
		Junonia tugela (Trimen, 1879)	African leaf butterfly (moved to Precis tugela)	southern Africa, ranging from Ethiopia to South Africa
		Junonia vestina C. & R. Felder, [1867]	Andean buckeye	southern Peru and Bolivia
		Junonia villida (Fabricius, 1787)	meadow argus	Australia and Nelsons Island
		Junonia wahlbergi Brévignon, 2008		Guyana
		Junonia westermanni Westwood, 1870	blue spot pansy	Tropical Africa
		Junonia zonalis C. & R. Felder, [1867]	Caribbean buckeye	Florida, the Caribbean, Mexico, Central America, and tropical South America
