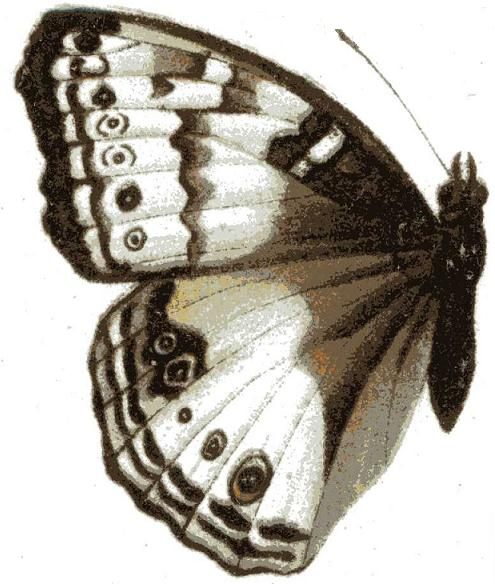

Scientific classification
- Domain: Eukaryota
- Kingdom: Animalia
- Phylum: Arthropoda
- Class: Insecta
- Order: Lepidoptera
- Family: Nymphalidae
- Genus: Junonia
- Species: J. hadrope

Binomial name
- Junonia hadrope Doubleday, 1847

Synonyms
- Junonia ixia Butler, 1866

= Junonia hadrope =

Species of butterfly

Junonia hadrope, the Volta pansy, is a butterfly in the family Nymphalidae. It is found in Ghana (the Volta Region).
