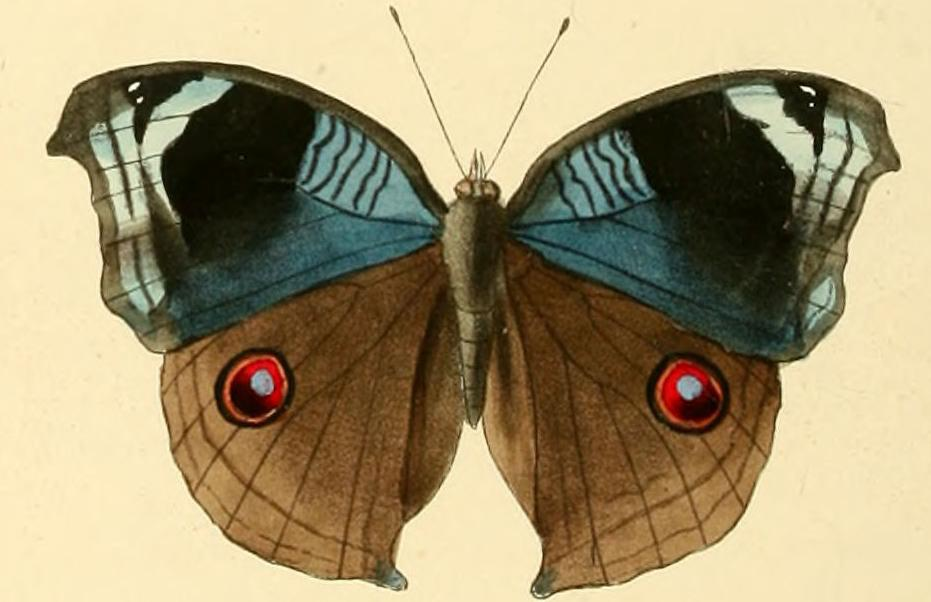

Scientific classification
- Domain: Eukaryota
- Kingdom: Animalia
- Phylum: Arthropoda
- Class: Insecta
- Order: Lepidoptera
- Family: Nymphalidae
- Genus: Junonia
- Species: J. artaxia

Binomial name
- Junonia artaxia Hewitson, [1864]

Synonyms
- Precis nachtigali Dewitz, 1879; Precis nobilitata Thurau, 1903

= Junonia artaxia =

Species of butterfly

Junonia artaxia, the African pansy or commodore, is a butterfly in the family Nymphalidae. It is found in eastern Angola, the Democratic Republic of the Congo (Lomami, Kabinda, Lualaba, Shaba and Tanganika) Burundi, Kenya, southern and western Tanzania, Zambia, Malawi, Mozambique and Zimbabwe. The habitat consists of Brachystegia woodland.

Adults are on wing from August to March. There are distinct seasonal forms.

The larvae feed on Hygrophila species.
