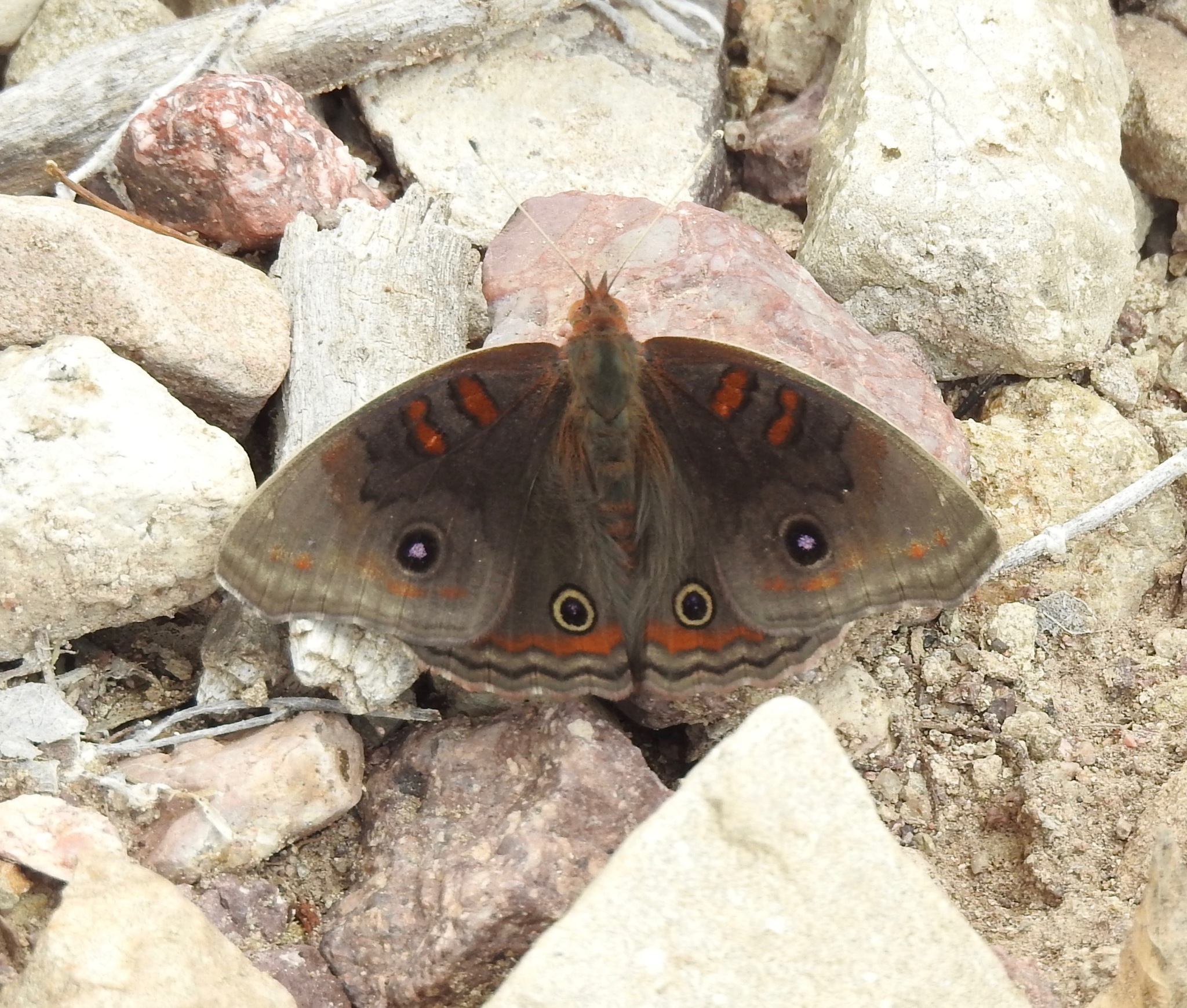
- Junonia nigrosuffusa, dark buckeye, Arizona

Scientific classification
- Domain: Eukaryota
- Kingdom: Animalia
- Phylum: Arthropoda
- Class: Insecta
- Order: Lepidoptera
- Family: Nymphalidae
- Subfamily: Nymphalinae
- Tribe: Junoniini
- Genus: Junonia
- Species: J. nigrosuffusa

Binomial name
- Junonia nigrosuffusa Barnes & McDunnough, 1916

= Junonia nigrosuffusa =

Species of butterfly

Junonia nigrosuffusa, the dark buckeye, is a species in the butterfly family Nymphalidae. It is found in the southwestern United States and Mexico.

Junonia nigrosuffusa and Junonia zonalis were formerly subspecies of Junonia evarete, the tropical buckeye, but were elevated to the species rank as a result of phylogenetic and DNA research. As a result, the geographic range of Junonia evarete is limited primarily to South America.
