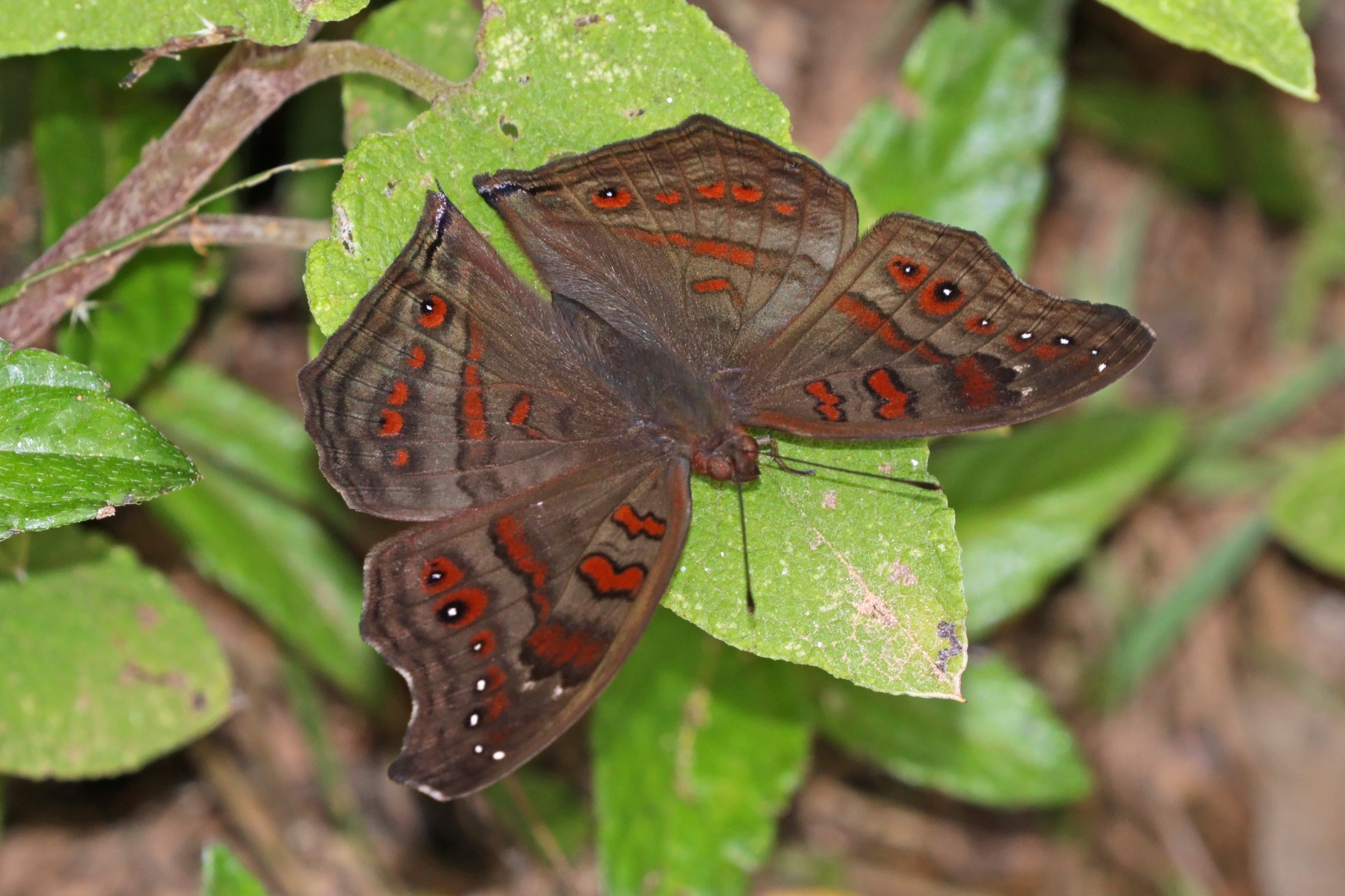
- Near Andasibe-Mantadia National Park, Madagascar

Scientific classification
- Domain: Eukaryota
- Kingdom: Animalia
- Phylum: Arthropoda
- Class: Insecta
- Order: Lepidoptera
- Family: Nymphalidae
- Genus: Junonia
- Species: J. goudotii

Binomial name
- Junonia goudotii (Boisduval, 1833)

Synonyms
- Vanessa goudotii Boisduval, 1833; Junonia goudoti

= Junonia goudotii =

Species of butterfly

Junonia goudotii is a butterfly in the family Nymphalidae. It is found on Madagascar, the Comoros and Mauritius. The habitat consists of forest margins and transformed grassland.
