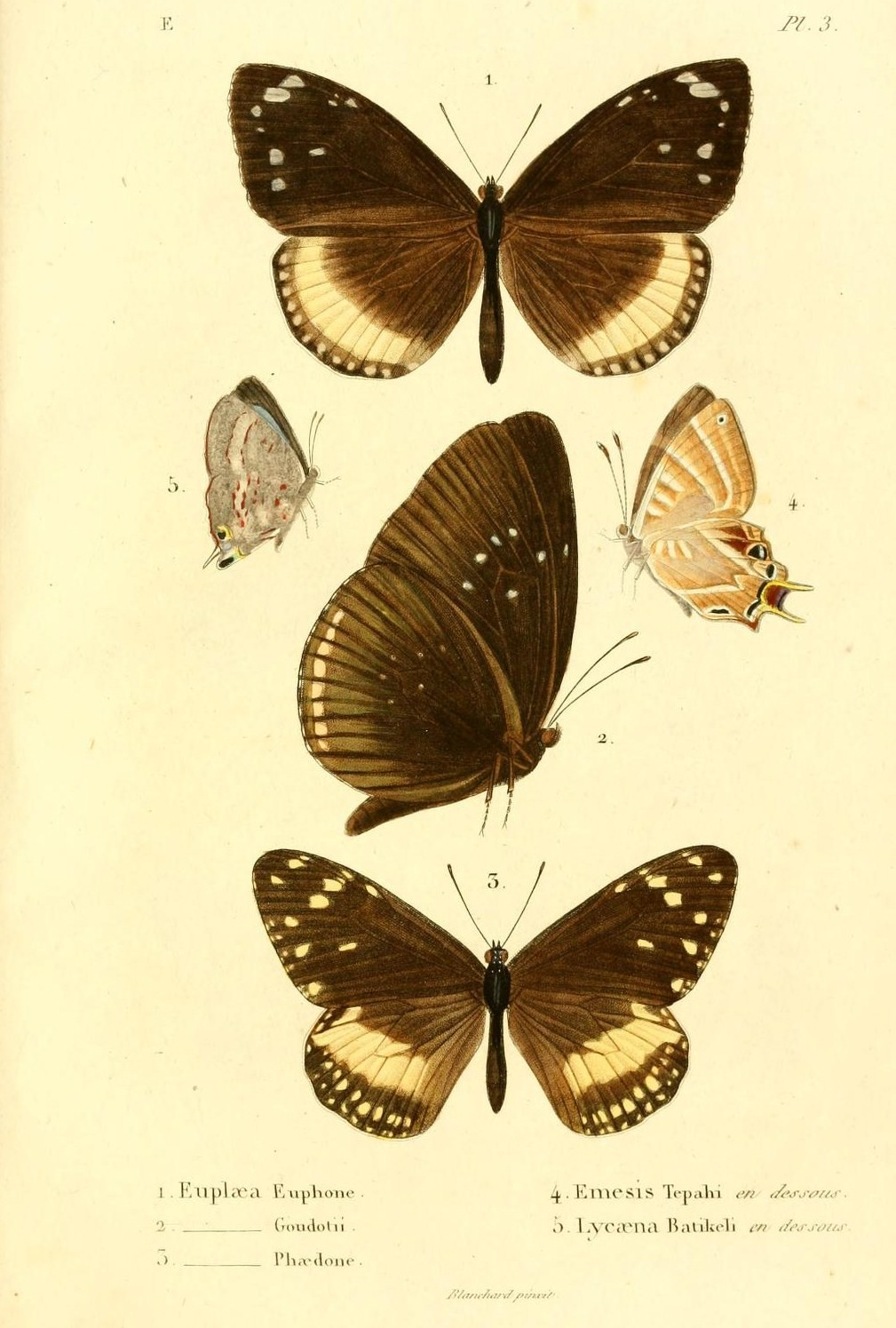

Conservation status
- Vulnerable (IUCN 2.3)

Scientific classification
- Kingdom: Animalia
- Phylum: Arthropoda
- Clade: Pancrustacea
- Class: Insecta
- Order: Lepidoptera
- Family: Nymphalidae
- Genus: Euploea
- Species: E. euphon

Binomial name
- Euploea euphon (Fabricius, 1798)

Synonyms
- Papilio euphon Fabricius, 1798; Danais baudiniana Godart, 1819

= Mascarene crow =

Species of butterfly

The Mascarene crow (Euploea euphon) is a species of Nymphalidae butterfly in the Danainae subfamily. It is found in Mauritius and Réunion.

The larvae feed on Ficus repens and Nerium oleander.
