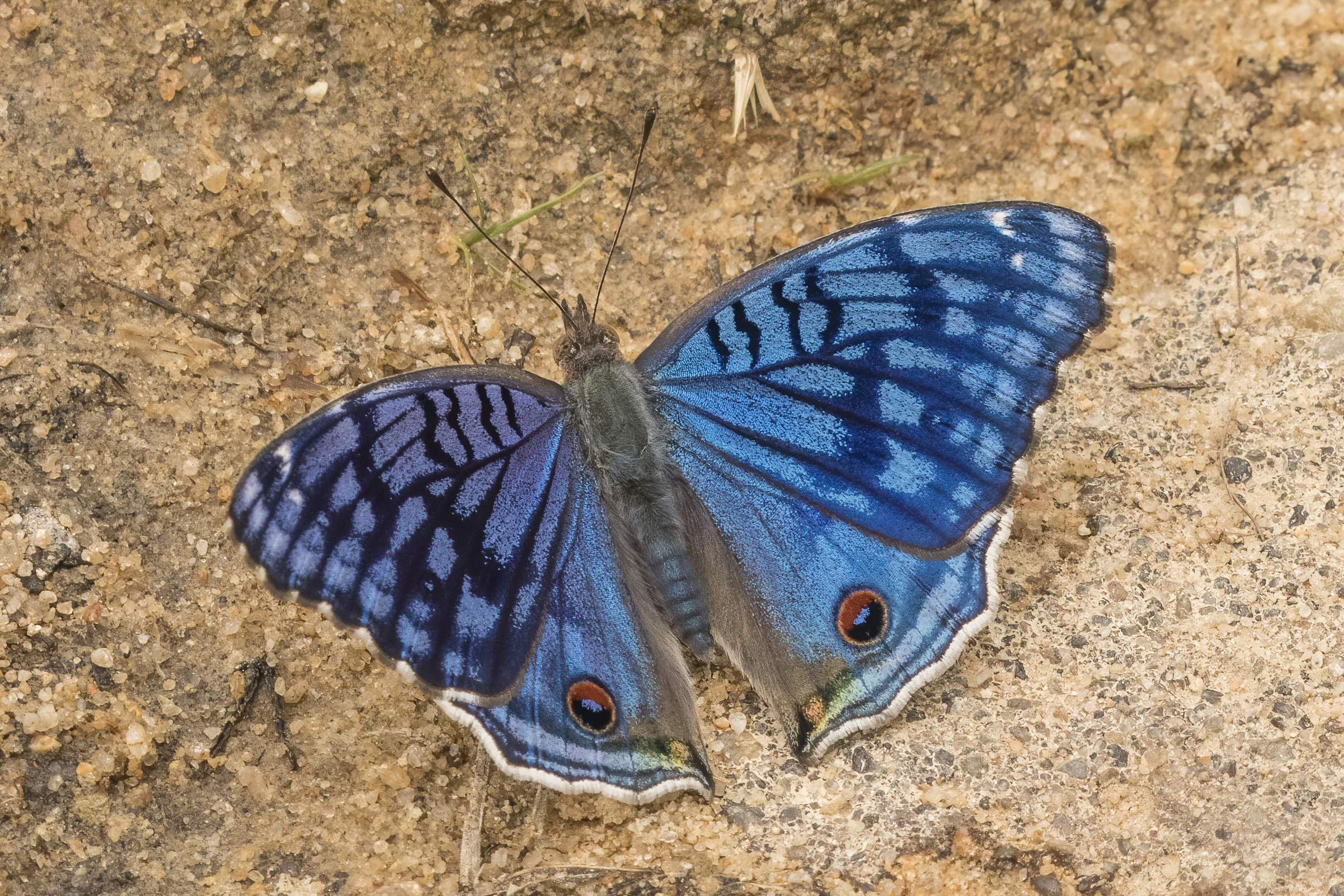
- Male, Madagascar
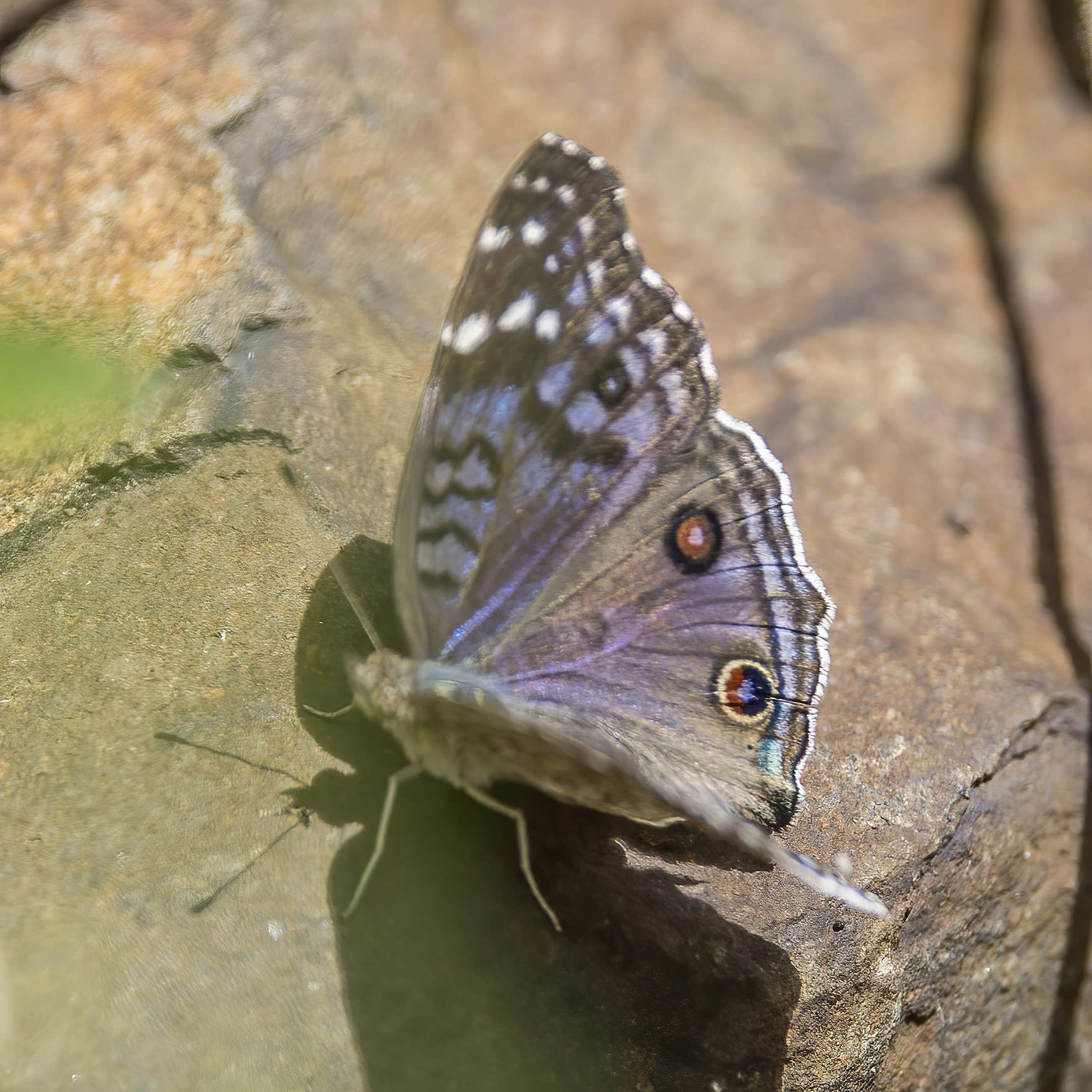
- Female

Scientific classification
- Kingdom: Animalia
- Phylum: Arthropoda
- Class: Insecta
- Order: Lepidoptera
- Family: Nymphalidae
- Genus: Junonia
- Species: J. rhadama

Binomial name
- Junonia rhadama (Boisduval, 1833)

Synonyms
- Vanessa rhadama Boisduval, 1833; Precis rhadama f. arida Aurivillius, 1913

= Junonia rhadama =

Species of insect

Junonia rhadama, the brilliant blue, is a butterfly in the family Nymphalidae. It is found on Madagascar, Mauritius, Rodrigues, Réunion, the Comoros, and the Seychelles (Astove Island). The habitat consists of transformed grasslands and Anthropogenic biomeanthropogenic environments.

The larvae feed on Barleria species.
