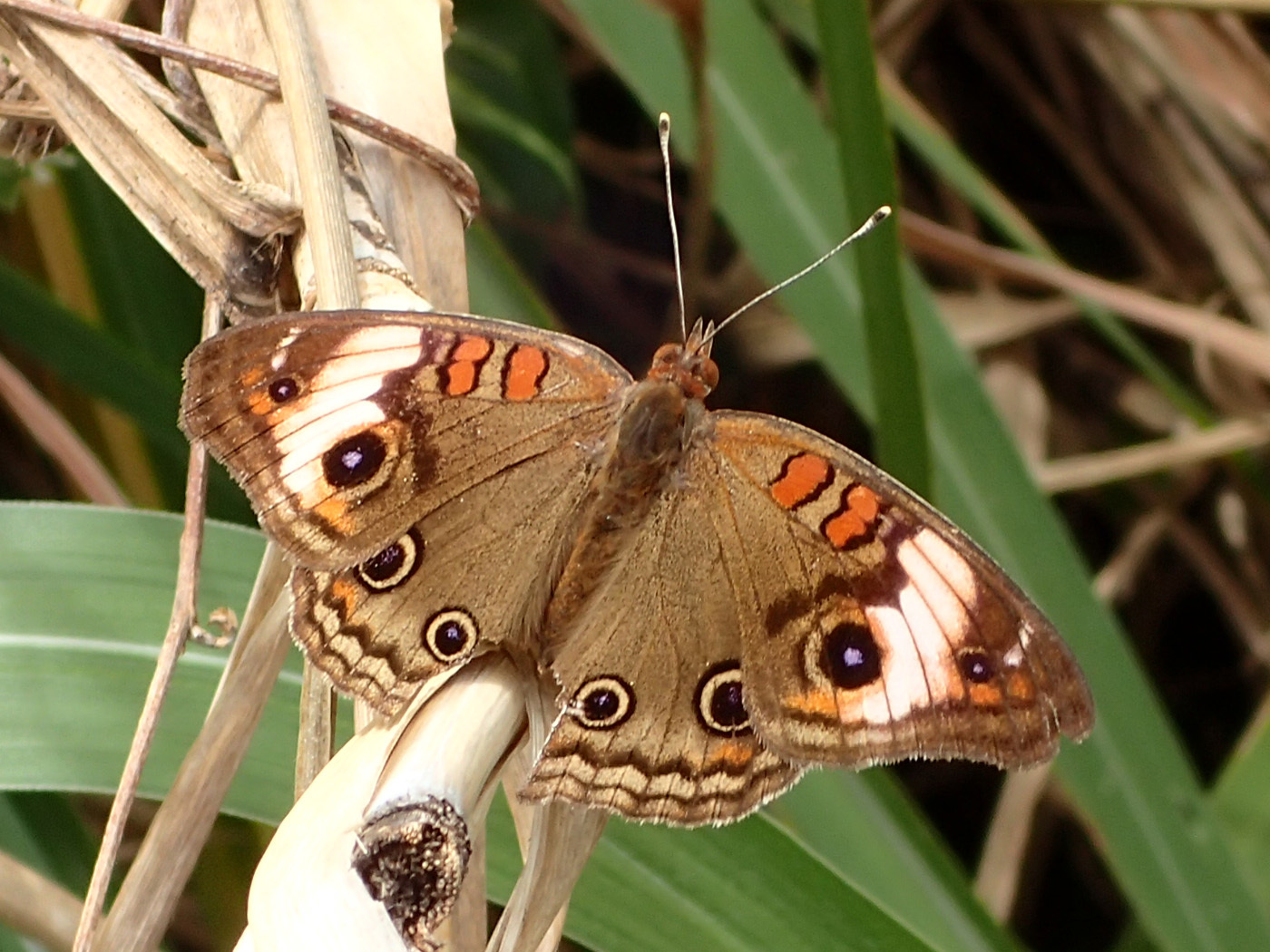
- Junonia zonalis, northern tropical buckeye, Jamaica

Scientific classification
- Kingdom: Animalia
- Phylum: Arthropoda
- Class: Insecta
- Order: Lepidoptera
- Family: Nymphalidae
- Subfamily: Nymphalinae
- Tribe: Junoniini
- Genus: Junonia
- Species: J. zonalis

Binomial name
- Junonia zonalis C.Felder & R.Felder, 1867

= Junonia zonalis =

Species of butterfly

Junonia zonalis, the northern tropical buckeye, is a species in the butterfly family Nymphalidae. It is found in Florida, the Caribbean, Mexico, Central America, and tropical South America. Junonia zonalis and Junonia nigrosuffusa were formerly subspecies of Junonia evarete, the tropical buckeye, but were elevated to the species rank as a result of phylogenetic and DNA research. As a result, the geographic range of Junonia evarete is limited primarily to South America.
