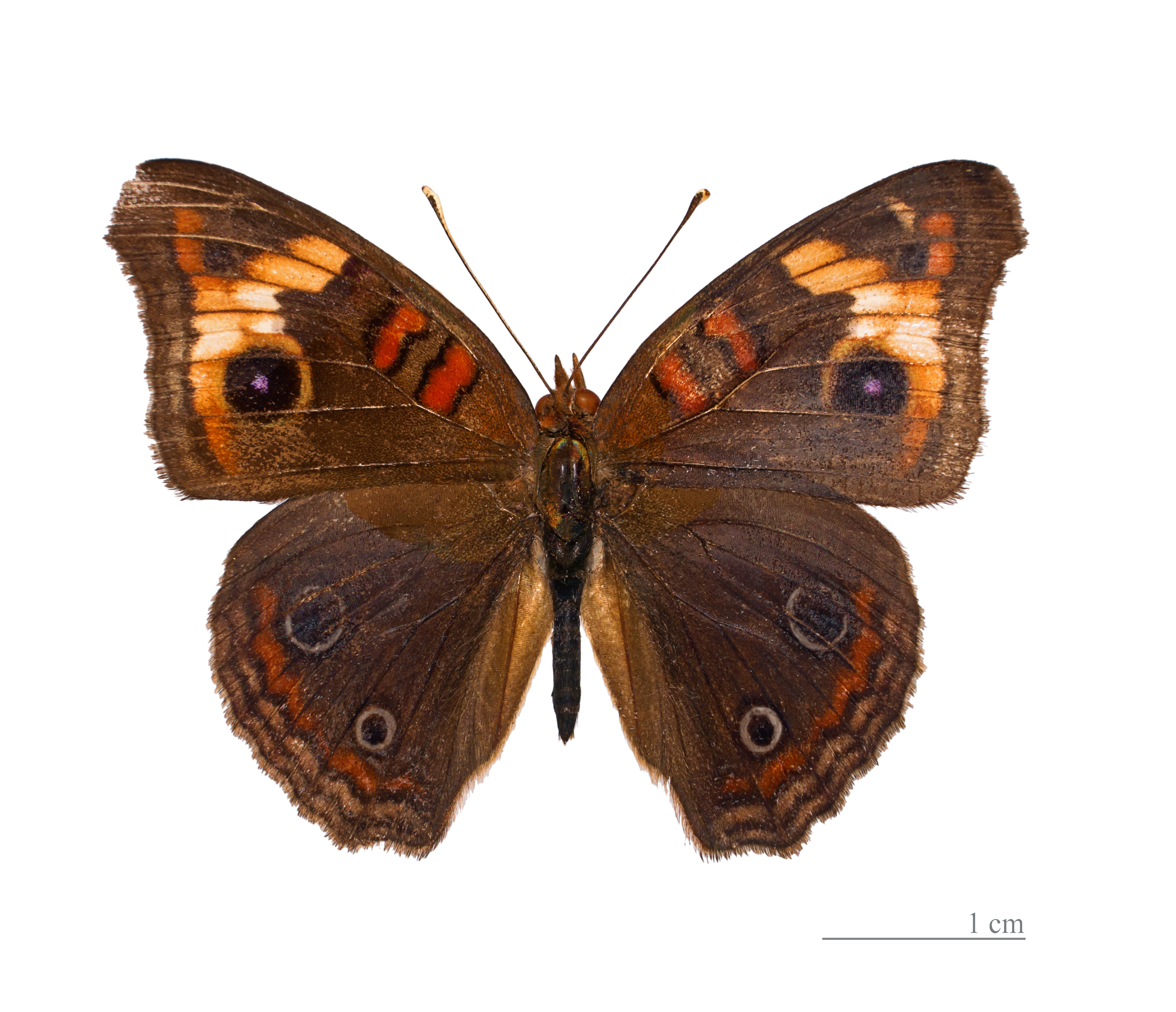
- Junonia genoveva - MHNT

Scientific classification
- Domain: Eukaryota
- Kingdom: Animalia
- Phylum: Arthropoda
- Class: Insecta
- Order: Lepidoptera
- Family: Nymphalidae
- Subfamily: Nymphalinae
- Tribe: Junoniini; Reuter, 1896

Genera
- See text

= Junoniini =

Tribe of butterflies

Junoniini is a tribe of nymphalid (brush-footed) butterflies.

== Genera ==
- Junonia Hübner, 1819 – buckeyes, commodores, pansies
- Precis Hübner, 1819 – pansies
- Protogoniomorpha Wallengren, 1857 (formerly in Salamis)
- Salamis Boisduval, 1833 – mother-of-pearls
- Yoma Doherty, 1886

Some classifications place the eggflies and diadems (Hypolimnas) here, others in the Kallimini.
