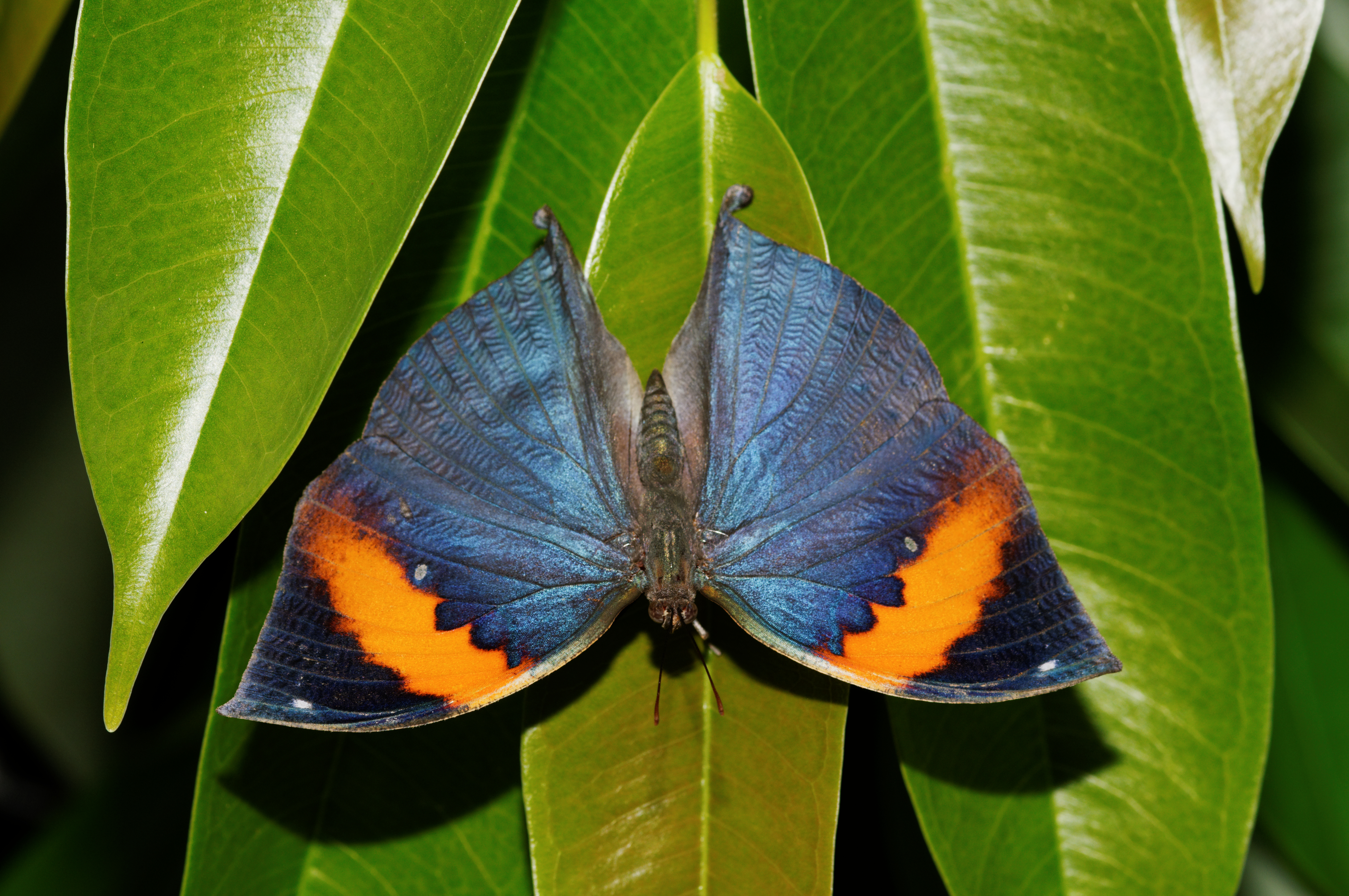
- Male, upperside
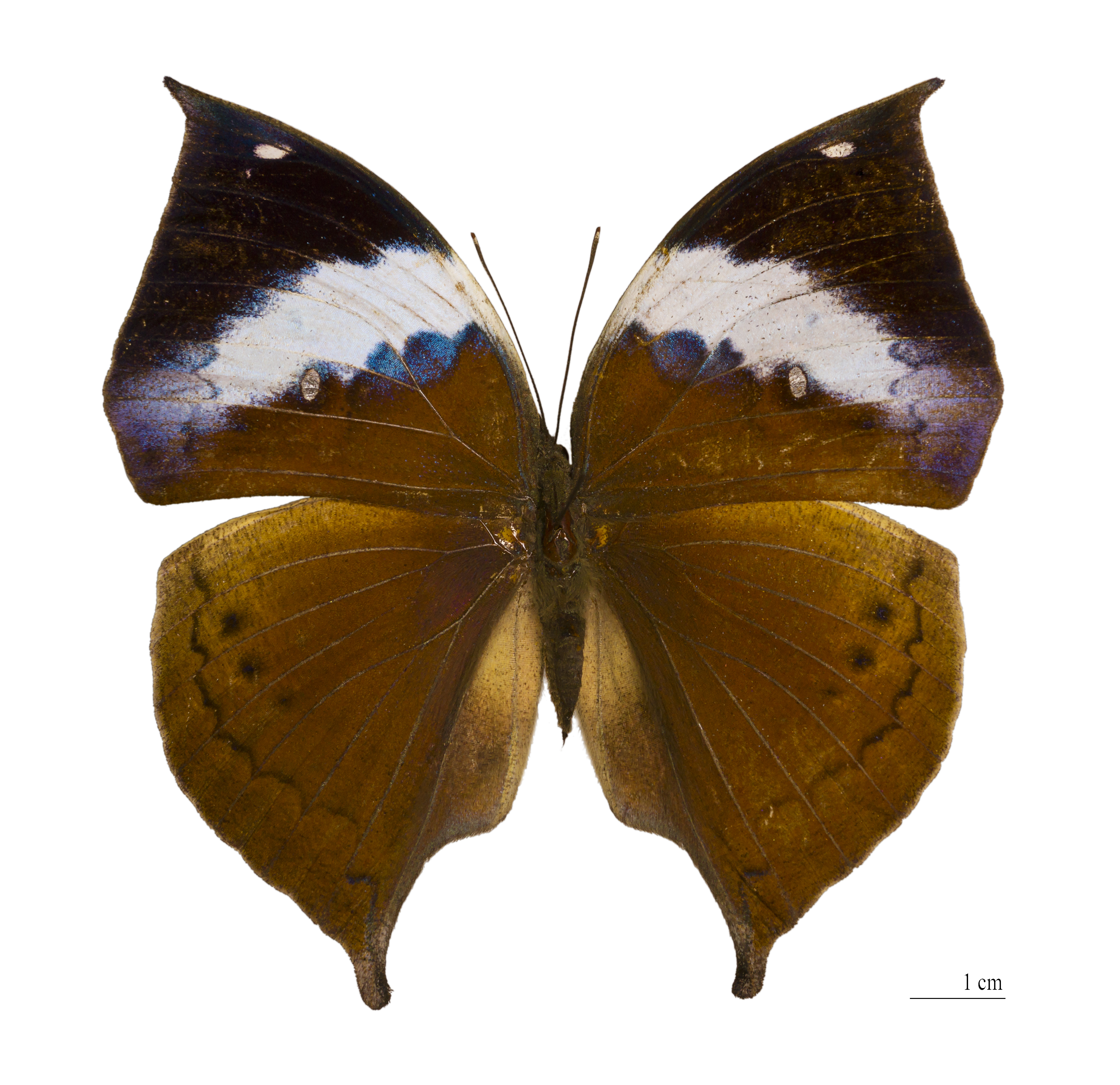
- Female, upperside

Scientific classification
- Kingdom: Animalia
- Phylum: Arthropoda
- Clade: Pancrustacea
- Class: Insecta
- Order: Lepidoptera
- Family: Nymphalidae
- Genus: Kallima
- Species: K. paralekta

Binomial name
- Kallima paralekta (Horsfield, [1829])

Subspecies
- Kallima paralekta paralekta (Horsfield, [1829]); Kallima paralekta tribonia Fruhstorfer, 1910

Synonyms
- Paphia paralekta Horsfield, [1829]

= Kallima paralekta =

Species of butterfly

Kallima paralekta, the Indian leafwing or Malayan leafwing, is a species of brush-footed butterfly of the genus Kallima. Despite its common names, it can be found in India or Malaysia and, endemic to Java and Sumatra in Indonesia. Like other members of its genus, it is remarkable for its strong resemblance to a dead leaf when its wings are folded. It was one of the species encountered by the British naturalist Alfred Russel Wallace in his travels in maritime Southeast Asia. It is mentioned in his famous 19th-century work The Malay Archipelago as one of the best examples of protective camouflage achieved through natural selection.

== Taxonomy ==
Kallima paralekta is classified under the genus Kallima (oakleafs) of the tribe Kallimini, subfamily Nymphalinae in the brush-footed butterfly family Nymphalidae. It is the type species of the genus Kallima. The species contains two subspecies, Kallima paralekta paralekta and Kallima paralekta tribonia. The male of the species was first described as Paphia paralekta by the American physician and naturalist Thomas Horsfield in 1829. The female was described in 1850 by the entomologist John O. Westwood. The type specimens of both were recovered from Java, Indonesia.

The species is commonly known as the "Indian leafwing", commonly found in India. Its native range was once known as the East Indies; or it might be because the similarly colored and closely related orange oakleaf (Kallima inachus) found in India and throughout tropical eastern Asia was at times confused and previously considered a subspecies of Kallima paralekta. It is also sometimes known as the "Malaysian dead leaf" or "Malayan leafwing", which is also misleading since it is not found in Malaysia. However a subspecies of Kallima limborgii found in the northwest of Peninsular Malaysia, Kallima limborgii amplirufa, was once included within Kallima paralekta as Kallima paralekta amplirufa.

== Description ==
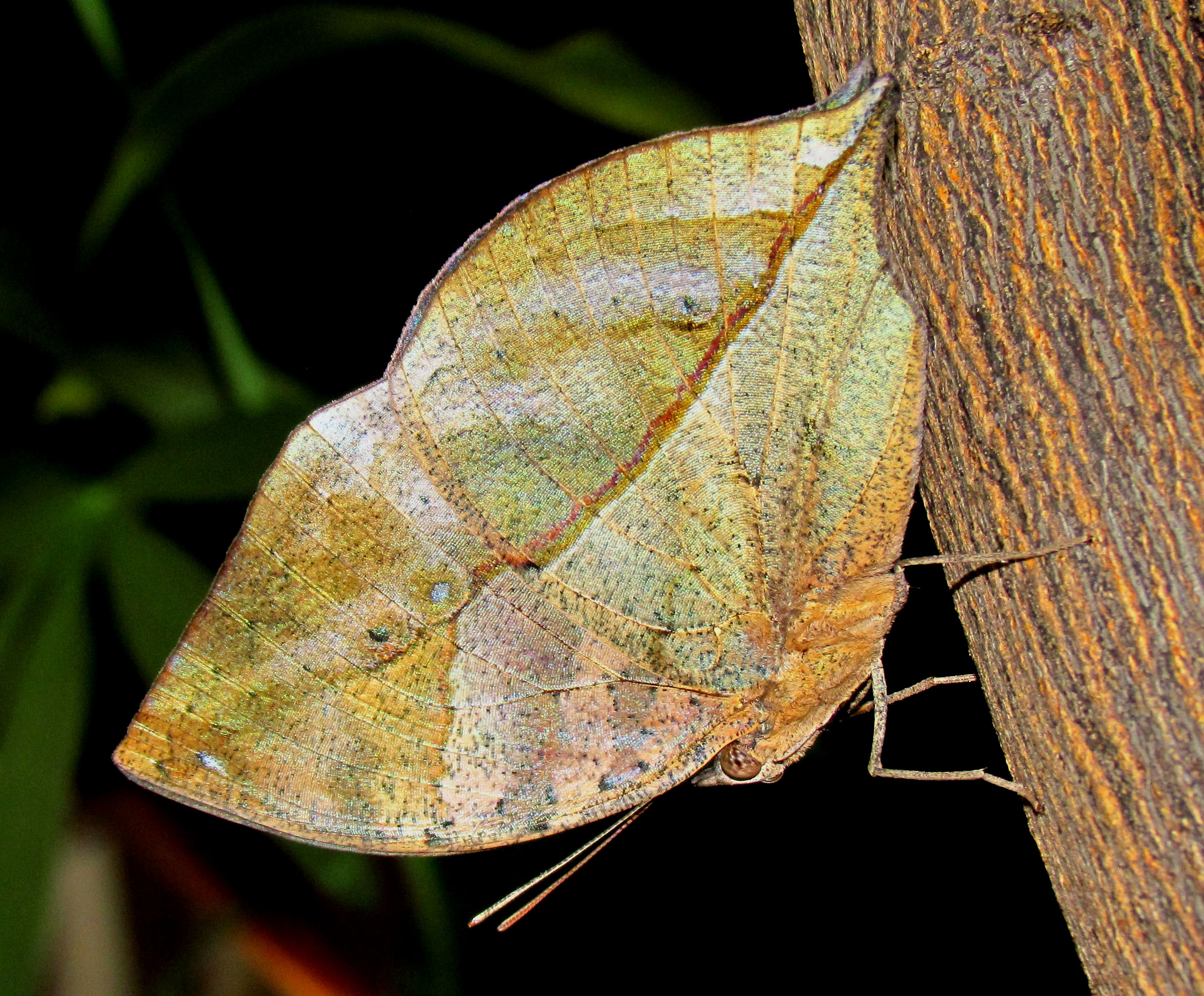
Individual with wings folded, showing its remarkable resemblance to a leaf.

The upper surfaces of the wings of the male Kallima paralekta have been described as extremely beautiful. They possess oblique bright orange bands (fascia) on the upper surfaces of their forewings, the inner borders of which terminate at the lower corner of the forewings. The areas below the orange bands and the entire upper surface of the hindwings are a brilliant deep blue to purple.

The females lack the bright coloration of the males. Their upper surfaces are generally a rusty brown. They also possess broad oblique bands on their forewings, but these are white. The tips of the forewings are hooked.

The undersides of the wings of both sexes are highly variable and no two specimens are exactly alike. However, the colors are always those of dead leaves like gray, brown, red, olive green, or pale yellow. They exhibit extraordinary representations of the various features found in decaying leaves. Patterns like blotches, dark spots, and powdery dots resembling mildew and other fungal growth are so realistic that observers may be tricked into thinking that the butterfly itself is being attacked by actual fungi. Also on the wings are small and oval scaleless areas (hyaline spots) that look like transparent "windows" and mimic holes left by insect larvae on leaves.

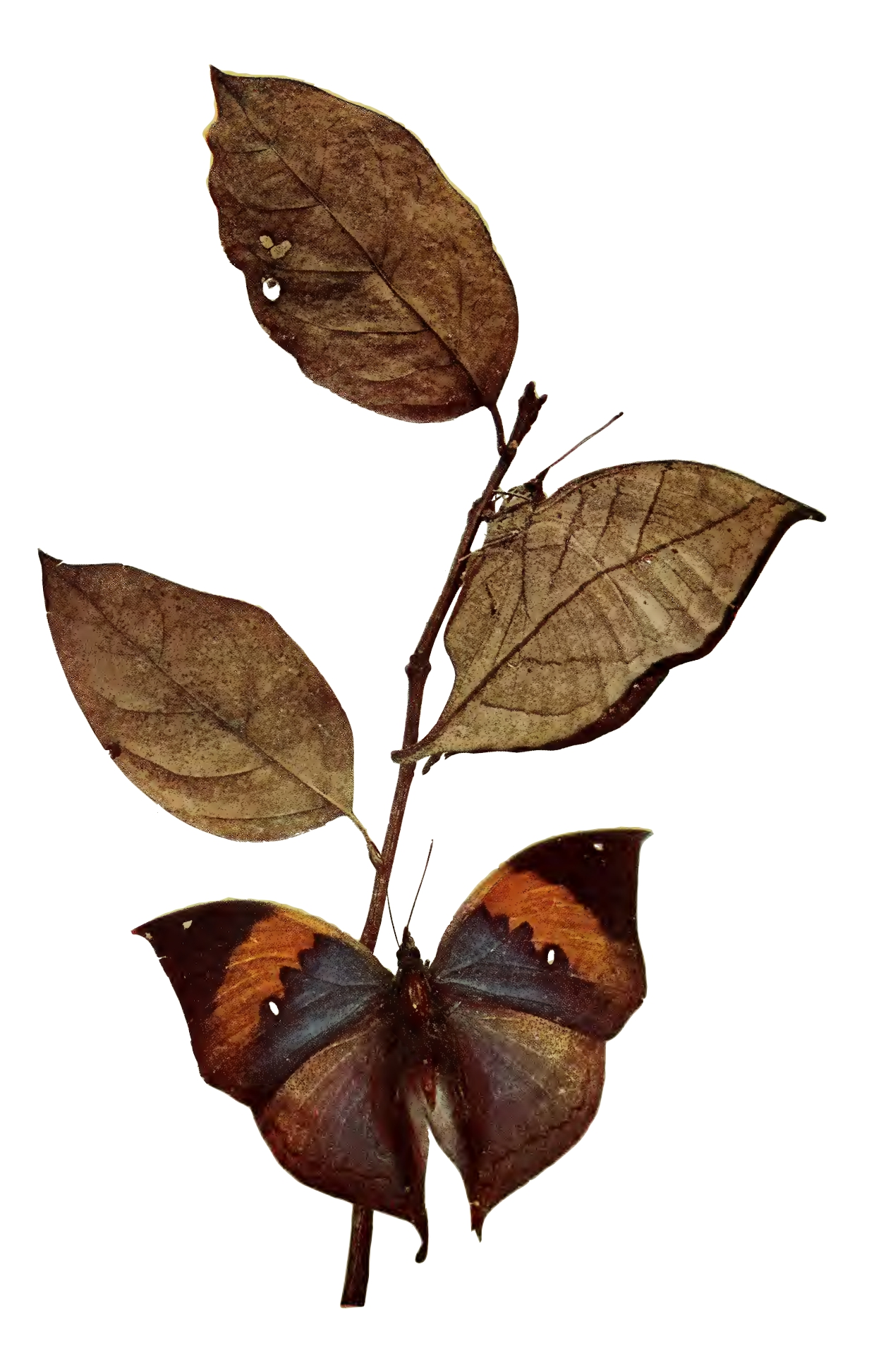
A 1902 illustration of two specimens of Kallima paralekta shows one with wings folded and almost indistinguishable from the dead leaves, and one with wings outstretched showing brilliant colors.

The tips of the forewings are pointed, while the tips of the hindwings extend into a short narrow tail, resembling leaf petioles. Running through the middle of both forewings and hindwings is a line, dark on one side and light on the other, representing the shaded and illuminated sides of a leaf midrib. From this line are fainter lines radiating forwards and resembling the secondary venation of leaves. Part of it is achieved through markings, and part through the incorporation of the actual venation of the wing. The head and the antennae fit exactly into the curve of the closed upper wings so as not to interfere with the outline. The resulting minor irregularities themselves resemble the wrinkled edges of withered leaves.

== Distribution ==
Kallima paralekta is endemic to Indonesia. The subspecies Kallima paralekta paralekta is only found in Java, Indonesia; while the subspecies Kallima paralekta tribonia is found in Sumatra, Indonesia.

== Ecology ==
The larvae feed on Strobilanthes and Pseuderanthemum species. Adult Kallima paralekta rarely feed on flower nectar. They are more commonly seen feeding on rotten fruit. The adults usually use the same perch while waiting for potential mates, flying off briefly and returning to the same spot.

Kallima paralekta was made famous in the 19th century by the British naturalist Alfred Russel Wallace. In his influential book The Malay Archipelago, Wallace describes it as "the most wonderful and undoubted case of protective resemblance in a butterfly". He vividly describes his experiences trying to catch specimens of Kallima paralekta in Sumatra:

The upper surfaces of its large wings are quite vivid and striking, and they are very easily spotted when in flight. However, as soon as the butterfly alights, almost always among dead leaves, it becomes virtually invisible due to its remarkable camouflage. Even when staring right at the spot where it seemed to disappear, one generally was unable to see it until it began flying again a few moments later.

Wallace used the butterfly as an example of natural selection in support of Wallace and Darwin's theory of evolution.

== Gallery ==
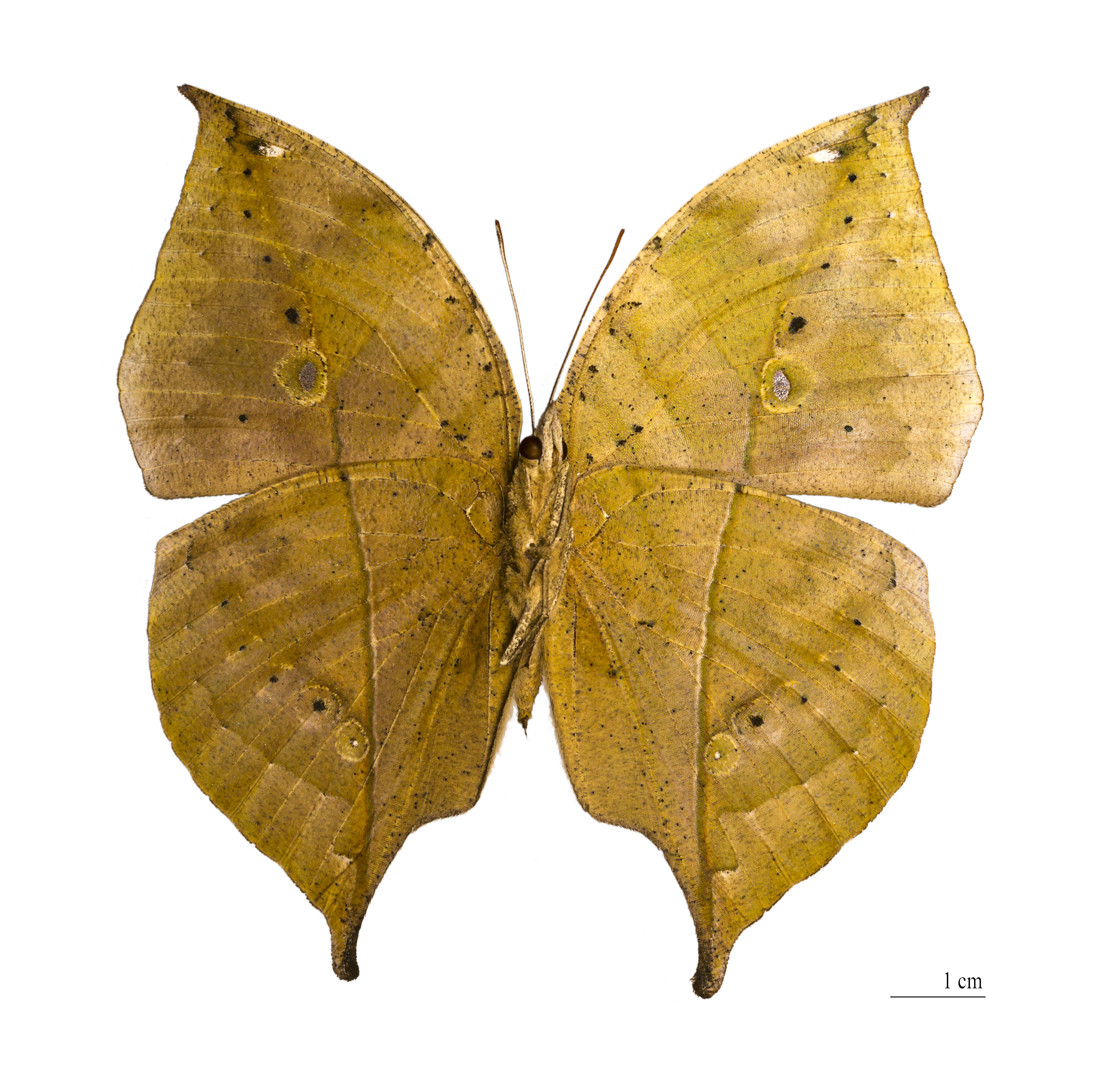
Female, underside, from Muséum de Toulouse, France

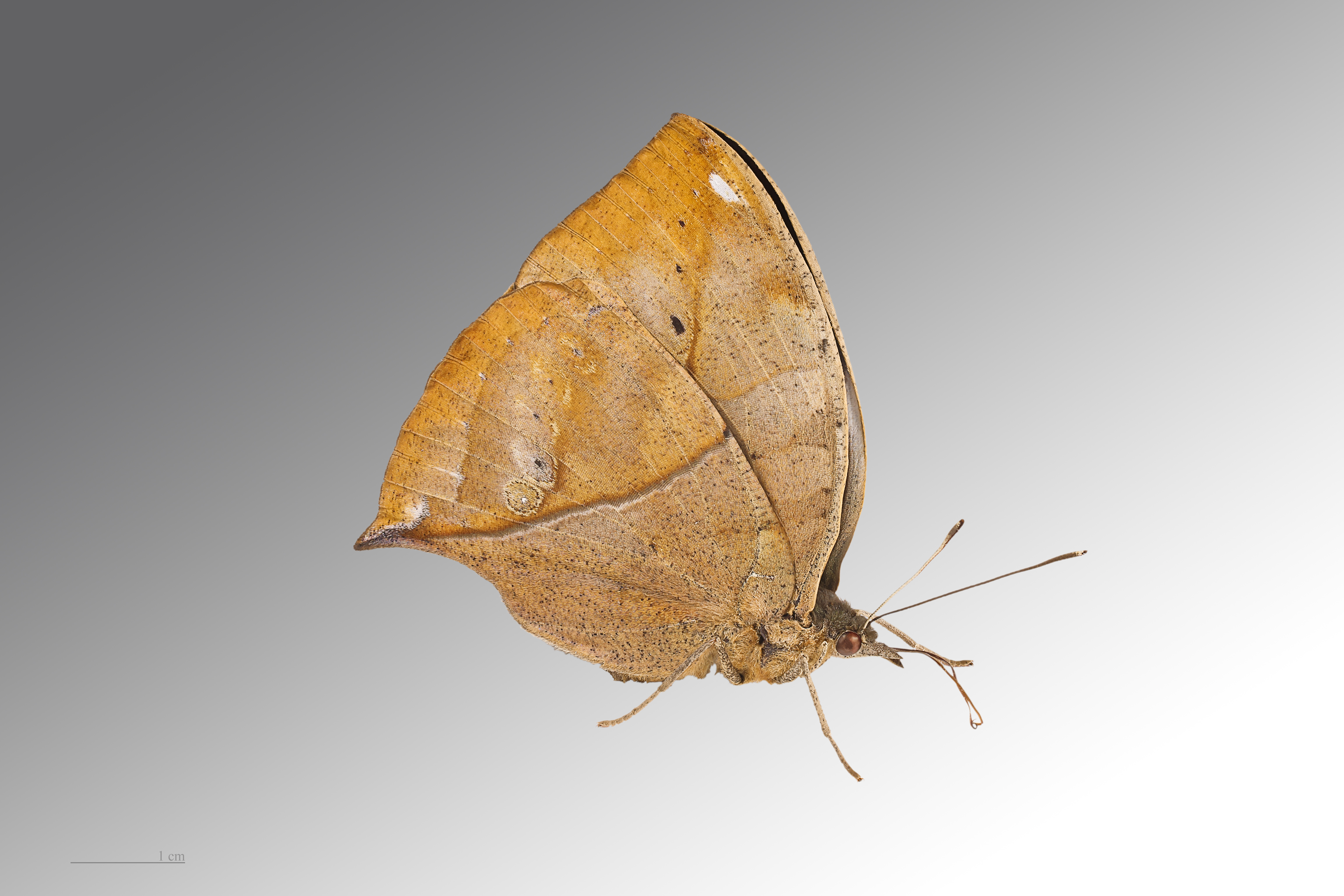
Female, underside, also from the Muséum de Toulouse

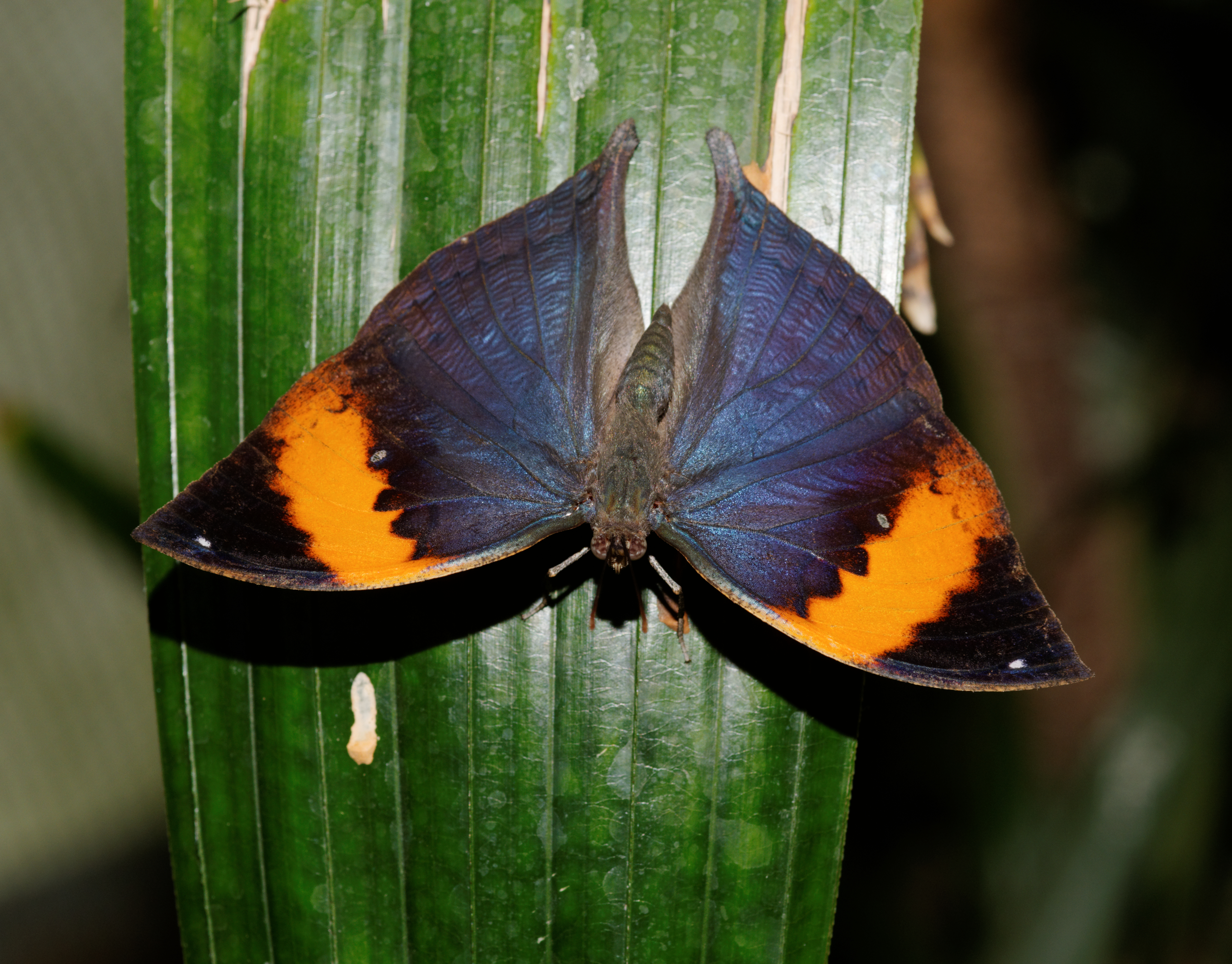
Male, upperside, from the Jardin des Papillons of Hunawihr, France

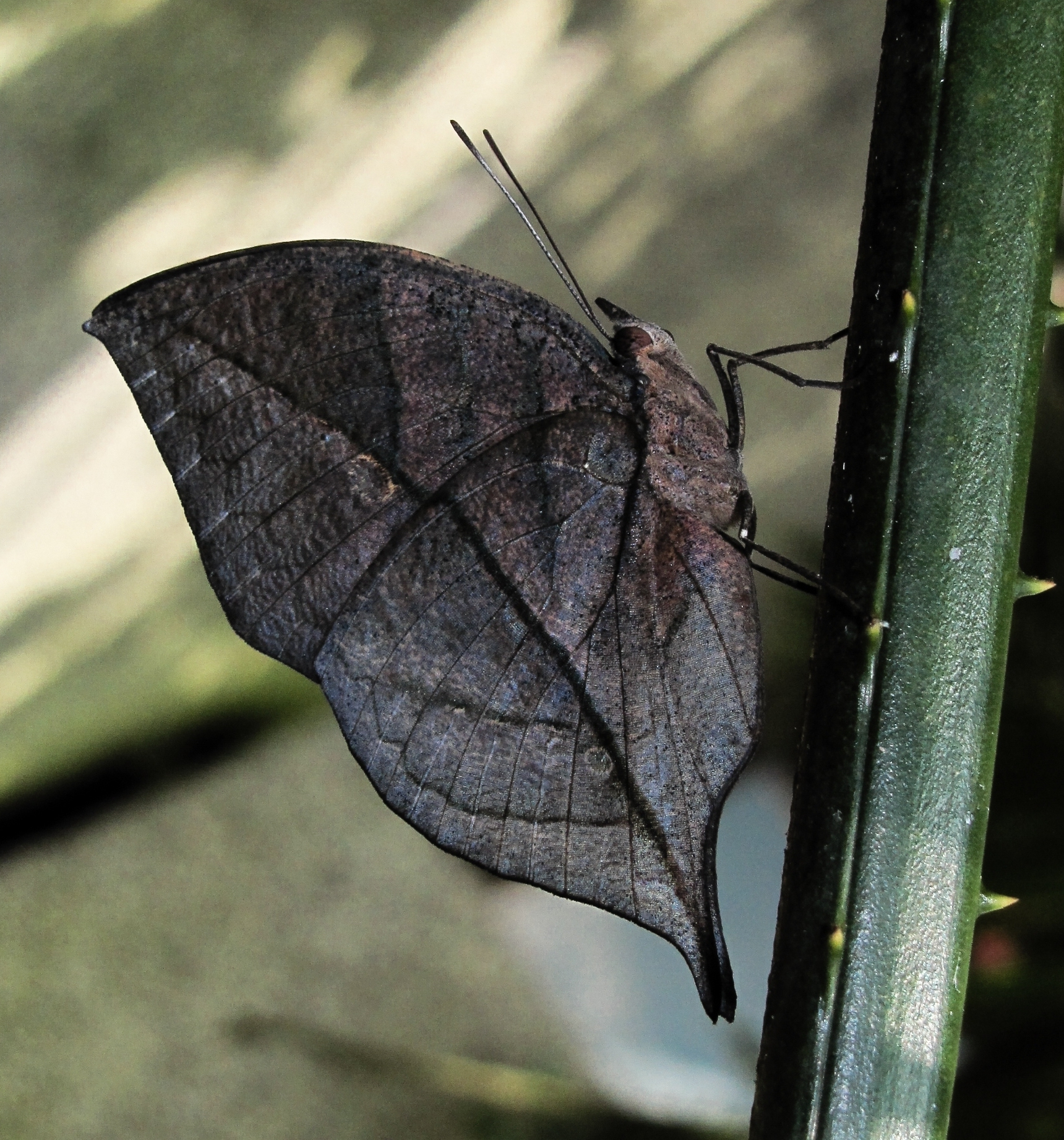
Specimen from the Collodi Butterfly House of Tuscany, Italy

== See also ==
- Anaea
- Coenophlebia
- Doleschallia
- Junonia
- Kallimoides
- Precis tugela
