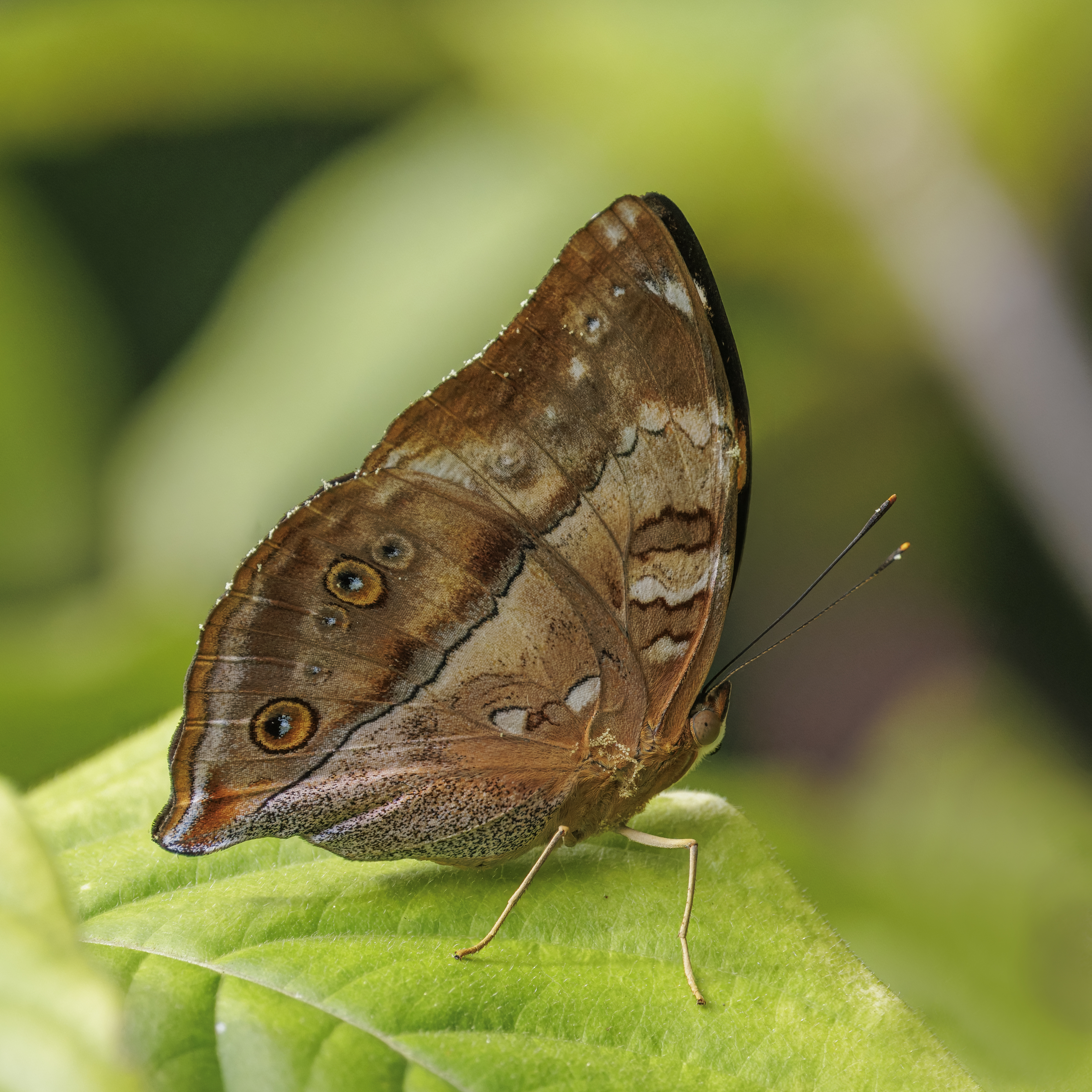
- Doleschallia tongana vomana, Fiji

Scientific classification
- Kingdom: Animalia
- Phylum: Arthropoda
- Clade: Pancrustacea
- Class: Insecta
- Order: Lepidoptera
- Family: Nymphalidae
- Tribe: Kallimini
- Genus: Doleschallia; C. & R. Felder, 1860

Species
- See text

= Doleschallia =

Genus of butterflies

Doleschallia is a genus of butterflies of the subfamily Nymphalinae in the family Nymphalidae. With their wings closed Doleschallia resemble dead leaves. Another Indo-Australian genus Kallima, and the African genera Kamilla, Mallika and Kallimoides are collectively known as dead leaf butterflies.

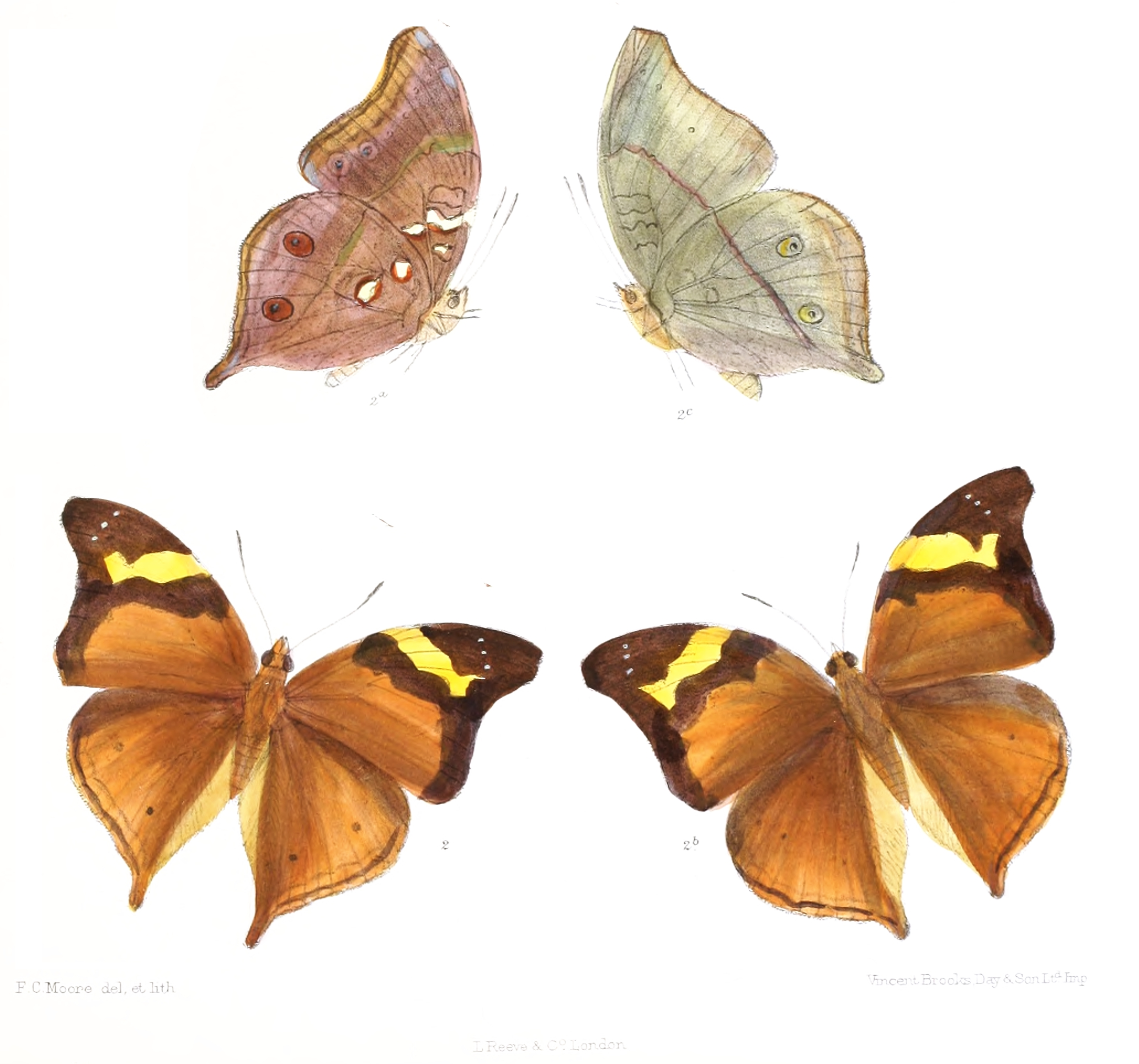
Doleschallia andamanica

They are medium to large (wingspan 60 – 120 mm) butterflies. They have a pronounced wing apex, and the hindwing tornus is extended and forms a short tail. This shape, together with the dead-leaf colouration, complete with a "midrib", and markings which resemble patches of mould and leaf galls gives the butterfly a remarkable resemblance to an attached or fallen dead leaf. The upper side, on the other hand, is often quite colourful, with black, orange and metallic blue as the dominant colours. There is often a marked difference between the sexes in the colour of the upper side. Some species also have somewhat different dry season and rainy season forms. The larvae are spiny and often quite colourful.

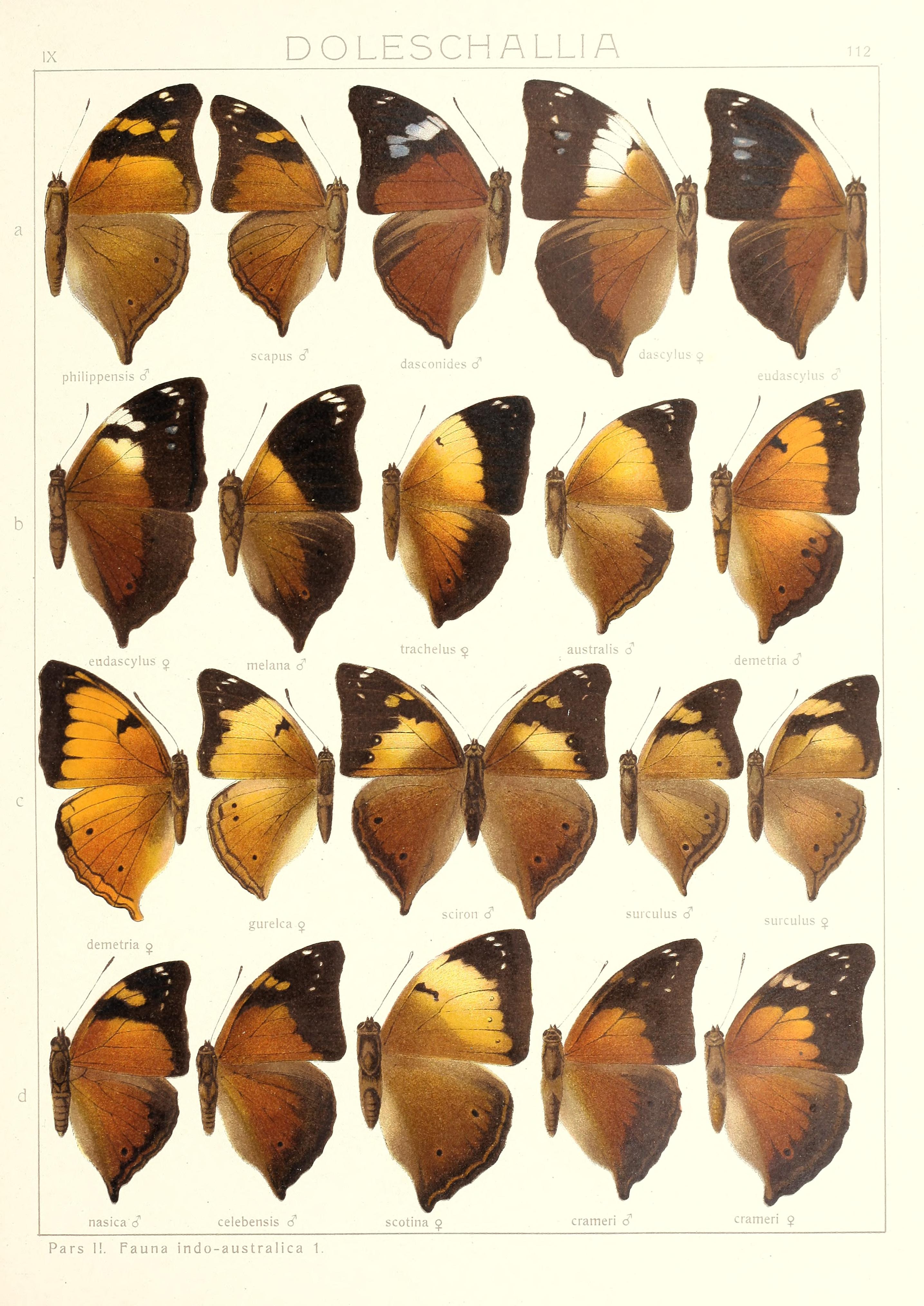

== Species and subspecies ==
Listed alphabetically:

- Doleschallia bisaltide (Cramer, [1777]) – autumn leaf
  - Doleschallia bisaltide bisaltide
  - Doleschallia bisaltide apameia Fruhstorfer
  - Doleschallia bisaltide australis C. & R. Felder, 1867
  - Doleschallia bisaltide cethega Fruhstorfer
  - Doleschallia bisaltide ceylonica Fruhstorfer – Sri Lanka
  - Doleschallia bisaltide continentalis Fruhstorfer, 1899
  - Doleschallia bisaltide denisi (Viette 1950) – New Caledonia
  - Doleschallia bisaltide gurelca Grose-Smith
  - Doleschallia bisaltide herrichi Butler – New Hebrides
  - Doleschallia bisaltide indica Moore, 1899
  - Doleschallia bisaltide menexema Fruhstorfer
  - Doleschallia bisaltide montrouzieri Butler – New Hebrides
  - Doleschallia bisaltide nasica Fruhstorfer, 1907
  - Doleschallia bisaltide nigromarginata Joicey and Noakes, 1915
  - Doleschallia bisaltide philippines Fruhstorfer
  - Doleschallia bisaltide polibete (Cramer, [1779])
  - Doleschallia bisaltide pratipa C. & R. Felder, 1860
  - Doleschallia bisaltide rennellensis Howarth
  - Doleschallia bisaltide scapus Fruhstorfer
  - Doleschallia bisaltide sciron Godman & Salvin
  - Doleschallia bisaltide siamensis Fruhstorfer, 1912
  - Doleschallia bisaltide tenimberensis Fruhstorfer
  - Doleschallia bisaltide tualensis Fruhstorfer
- Doleschallia browni Salvin & Godman, 1877
  - Doleschallia browni browni
  - Doleschallia browni scotina Fruhstorfer, 1912
- Doleschallia comrii Godman & Salvin, 1878 – Fergusson Island
- Doleschallia dascon Godman & Salvin, 1880 – New Guinea
  - Doleschallia dascon dascan
  - Doleschallia dascon dasconides Fruhstorfer, 1903New Guinea
- Doleschallia dascylus Godman & Salvin, 1880
  - Doleschallia dascylus dascylus
  - Doleschallia dascylus anicetus Fruhstorfer, 1915
  - Doleschallia dascylus endascylus Fruhstorfer, 1903
  - Doleschallia dascylus phalinus Fruhstorfer, 1907
- Doleschallia hexophthalmos (Gmelin, 1790) – New Guinea, Moluccas
  - Doleschallia hexophthalmos hexophthalmos
  - Doleschallia hexophthalmos areus Fruhstorfer, 1907
  - Doleschallia hexophthalmos donus Fruhstorfer, 1915
  - Doleschallia hexophthalmos gaius Fruhstorfer, 1912
  - Doleschallia hexophthalmos kapaurensis Fruhstorfer, 1899
  - Doleschallia hexophthalmos solus Fruhstorfer, 1912
  - Doleschallia hexophthalmos varus Fruhstorfer, 1912
- Doleschallia melana Staudinger, 1886 – Moluccas
- Doleschallia nacar (Boisduval, 1832)
  - Doleschallia nacar nacar
  - Doleschallia nacar trachelus Fruhstorfer, 1907
- Doleschallia noorna Grose-Smith & Kirby, 1893
  - Doleschallia noorna noorna
  - Doleschallia noorna antimia Fruhstorfer, 1912
  - Doleschallia noorna demetria Fruhstorfer, 1912
  - Doleschallia noorna fulva Joicey & Noakes, 1915
  - Doleschallia noorna lyncurion Fruhstorfer, 1912
- Doleschallia polibete (Cramer, [1779])
  - Doleschallia polibete celebensis Fruhstorfer, 1899 – Sulawesi, Talaud, Togian, Salayar, Buton, Galla, Kalao
  - Doleschallia polibete sulaensis Fruhstorfer, 1899 – Sula
  - Doleschallia polibete maturitas Tsukada, 1985
- Doleschallia rickardi Grose-Smith, 1890
  - Doleschallia rickardi rickardi – New Britain
  - Doleschallia rickardi pfeili Honrath, 1892 – New Ireland
- Doleschallia tongana Hopkins, 1927 – Polynesia and Melanesia
  - Doleschallia tongana tongana
  - Doleschallia tongana vomana Fruhstorfer – Fiji
