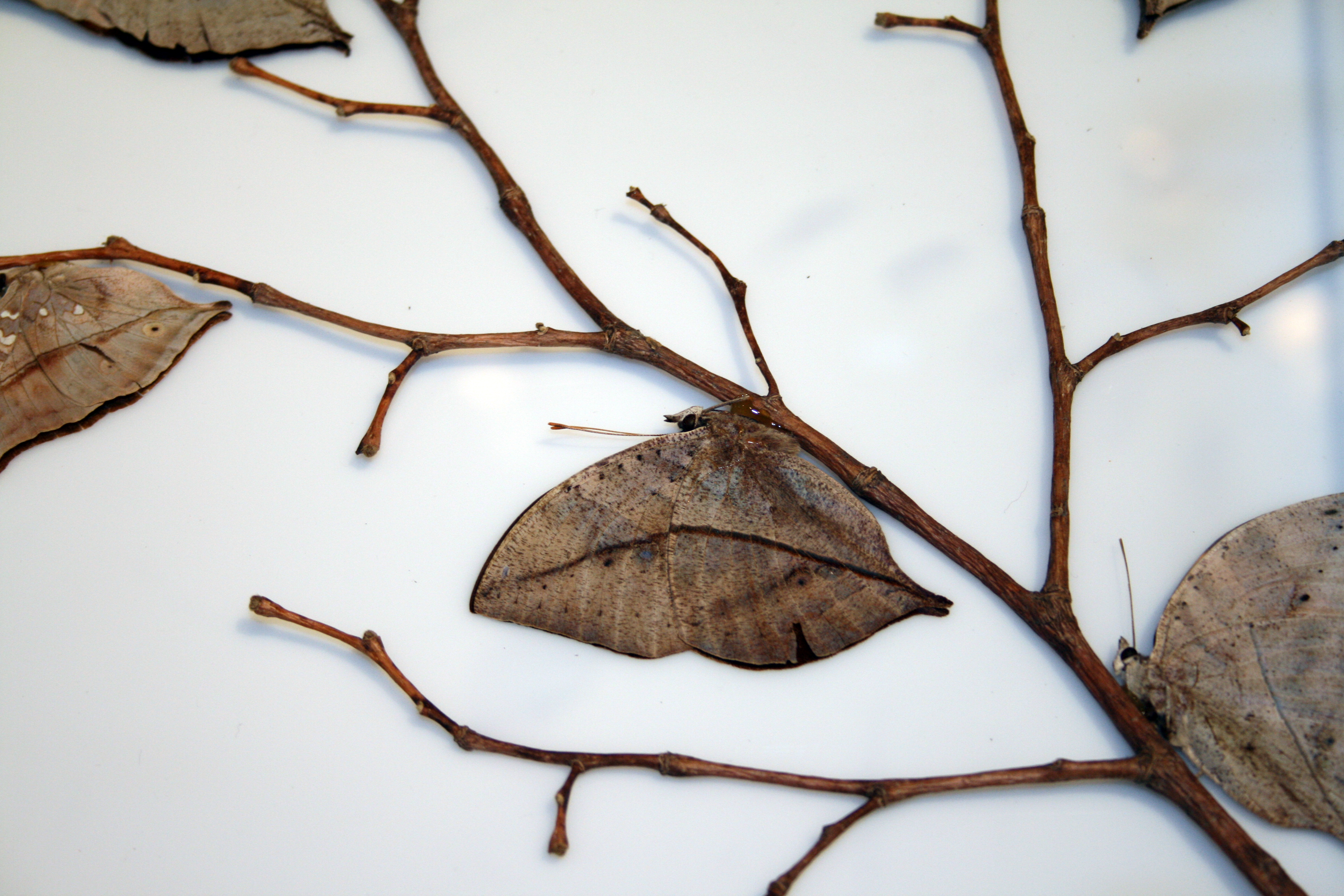
- Kallima inachus, showing the leaf-like appearance of the closed wings, which is typical of the genus.
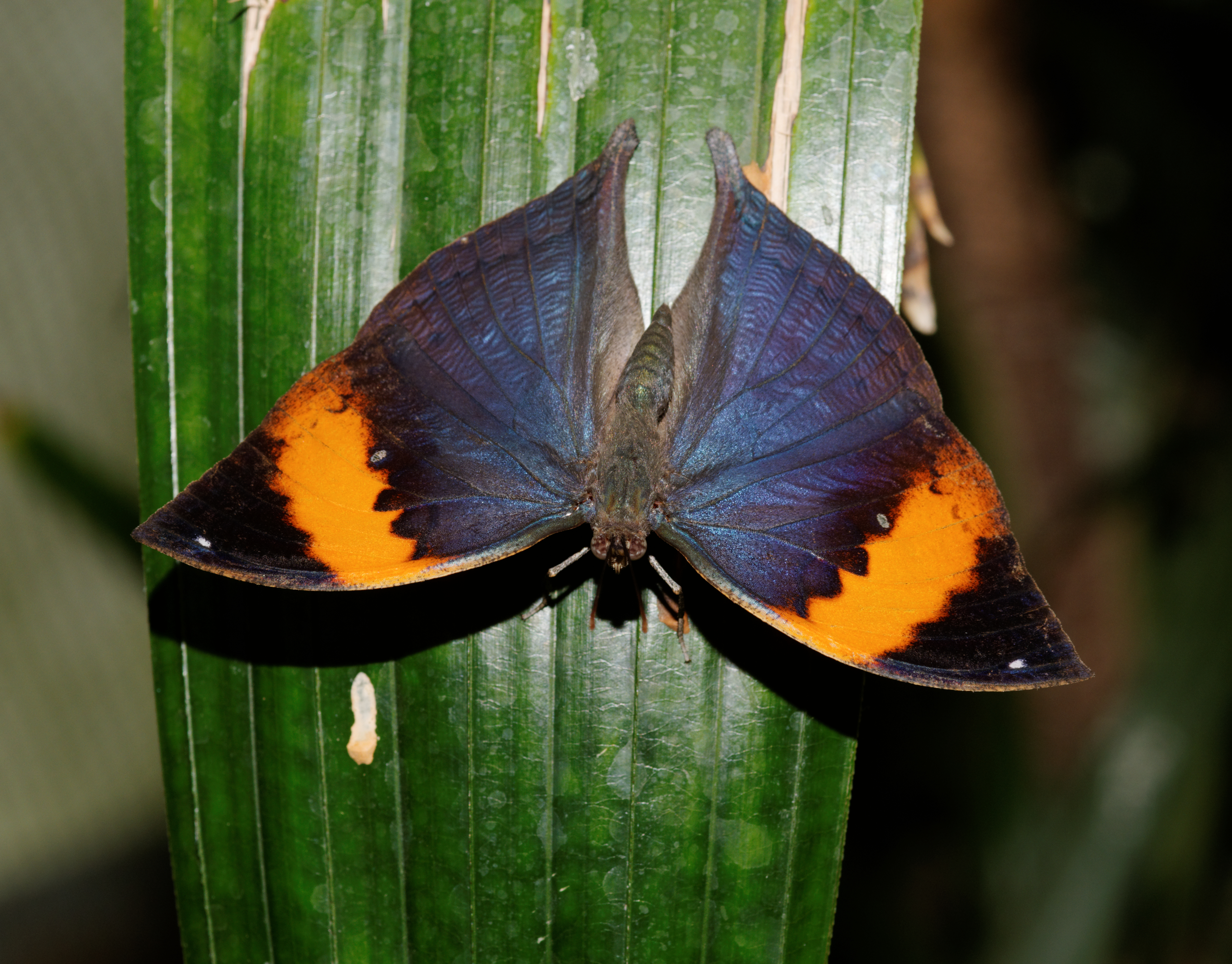
- Kallima paralekta, male showing the brilliant colors of the upper surfaces of the wings.

Scientific classification
- Kingdom: Animalia
- Phylum: Arthropoda
- Clade: Pancrustacea
- Class: Insecta
- Order: Lepidoptera
- Family: Nymphalidae
- Tribe: Kallimini
- Genus: Kallima; Doubleday, 1849

Type species
- Paphia paralekta Horsfield, [1829]

Species
- See text

= Kallima =

Oakleafs

Genus of butterflies

Kallima, known as the oakleaf or oak leaf butterflies, is a genus of butterflies of the subfamily Nymphalinae in the family Nymphalidae. They are found in east, south and southeast Asia. Their common name is a reference to the lower surface of their wings, which is various shades of brown like a dead leaf.

When the wings are held closed, this results in a remarkable masquerade of a dead leaf, further emphasized by their wing shape.

== Taxonomy ==
This genus has traditionally also included a number of African species, but they are now usually placed in Kallimoides, Junonia (alternatively in Kamilla) and Mallika. The following species are currently members of the genus Kallima:

- Kallima albofasciata Moore, 1877 – Andaman oakleaf
- Kallima alompra Moore, 1879 – scarce blue oak leaf
- Kallima buxtoni Moore, 1879
- Kallima horsfieldii (Kollar, 1844) – Sahyadri blue oakleaf
- Kallima inachus (Boisduval, 1846) – orange oakleaf, Indian oakleaf, dead leaf
- Kallima limborgii Moore, 1879 – Peninsular Malaya leaf butterfly
- Kallima knyvetti de Nicéville, 1886 – scarce blue oakleaf
- Kallima paralekta (Horsfield, 1829) – Indian leafwing
- Kallima philarchus (Westwood, 1848) – Ceylon blue oakleaf
- Kallima spiridiva Grose-Smith, 1885

== Gallery ==
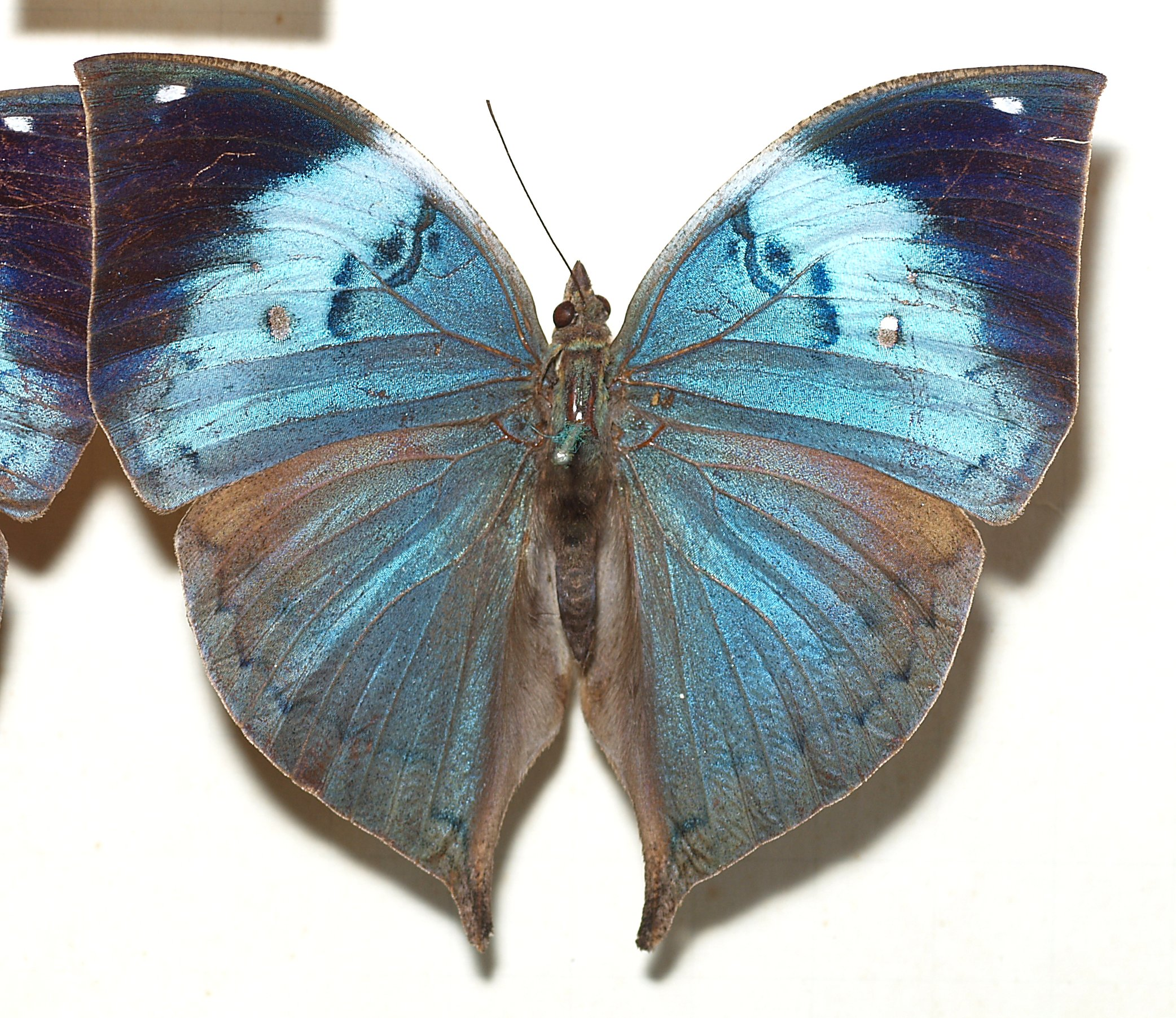
Kallima philarchus

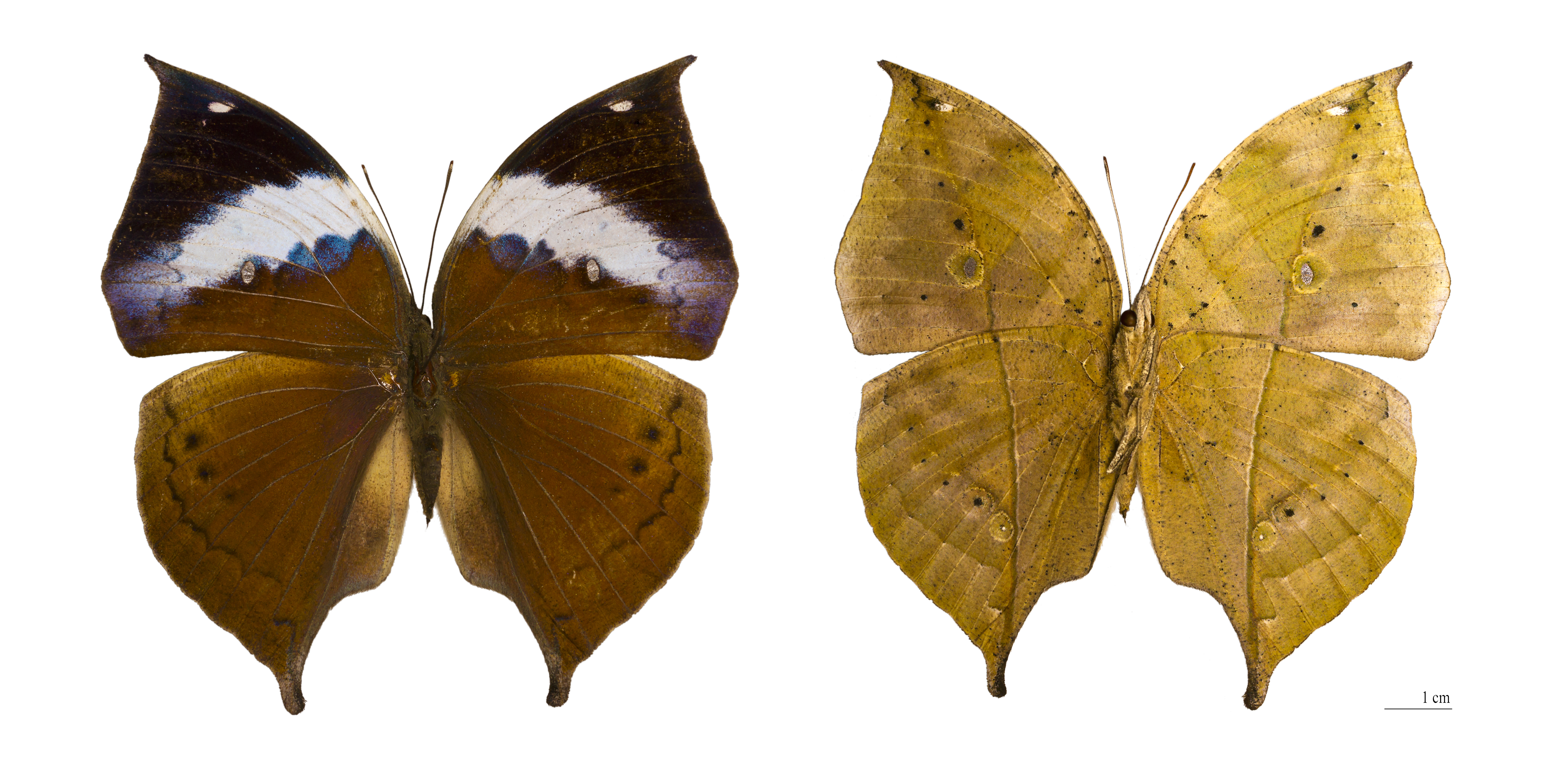
Kallima paralekta female

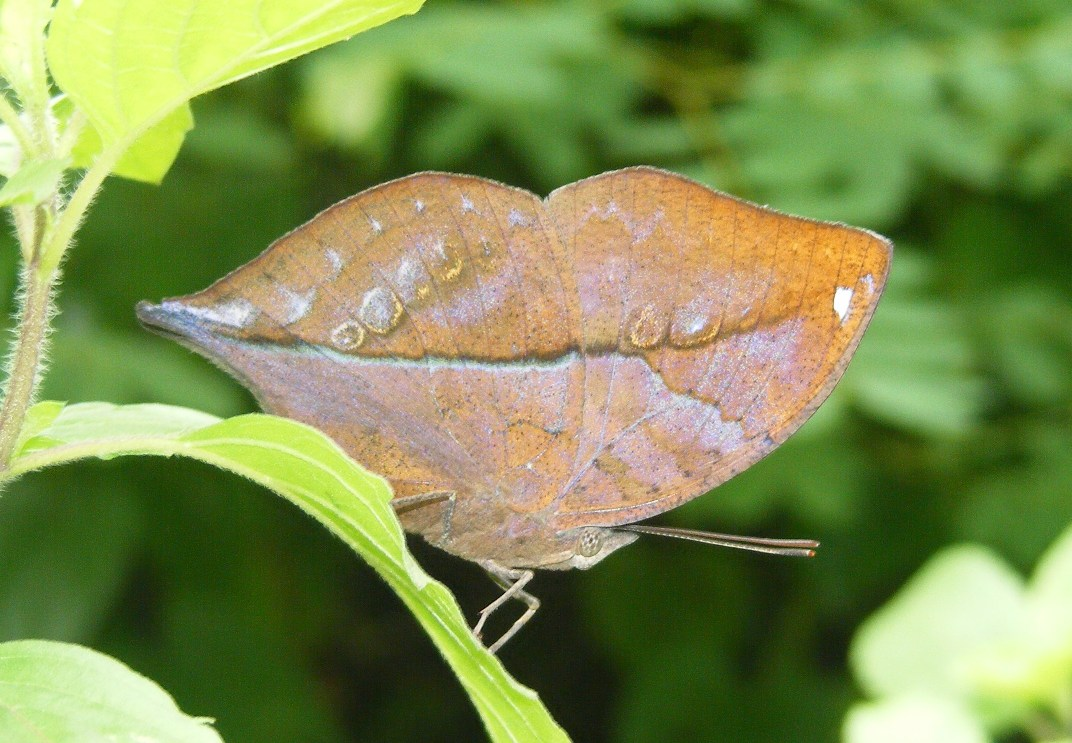
Kallima horsfieldii

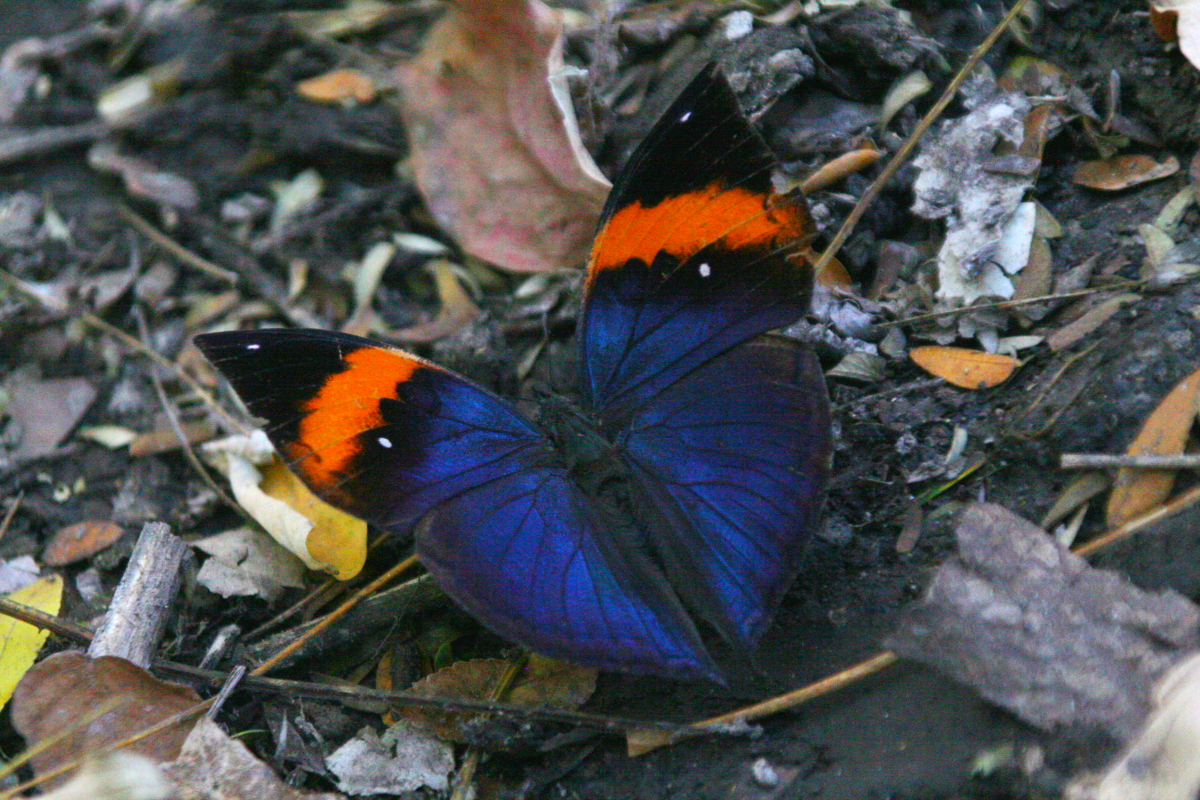
Kallima inachus

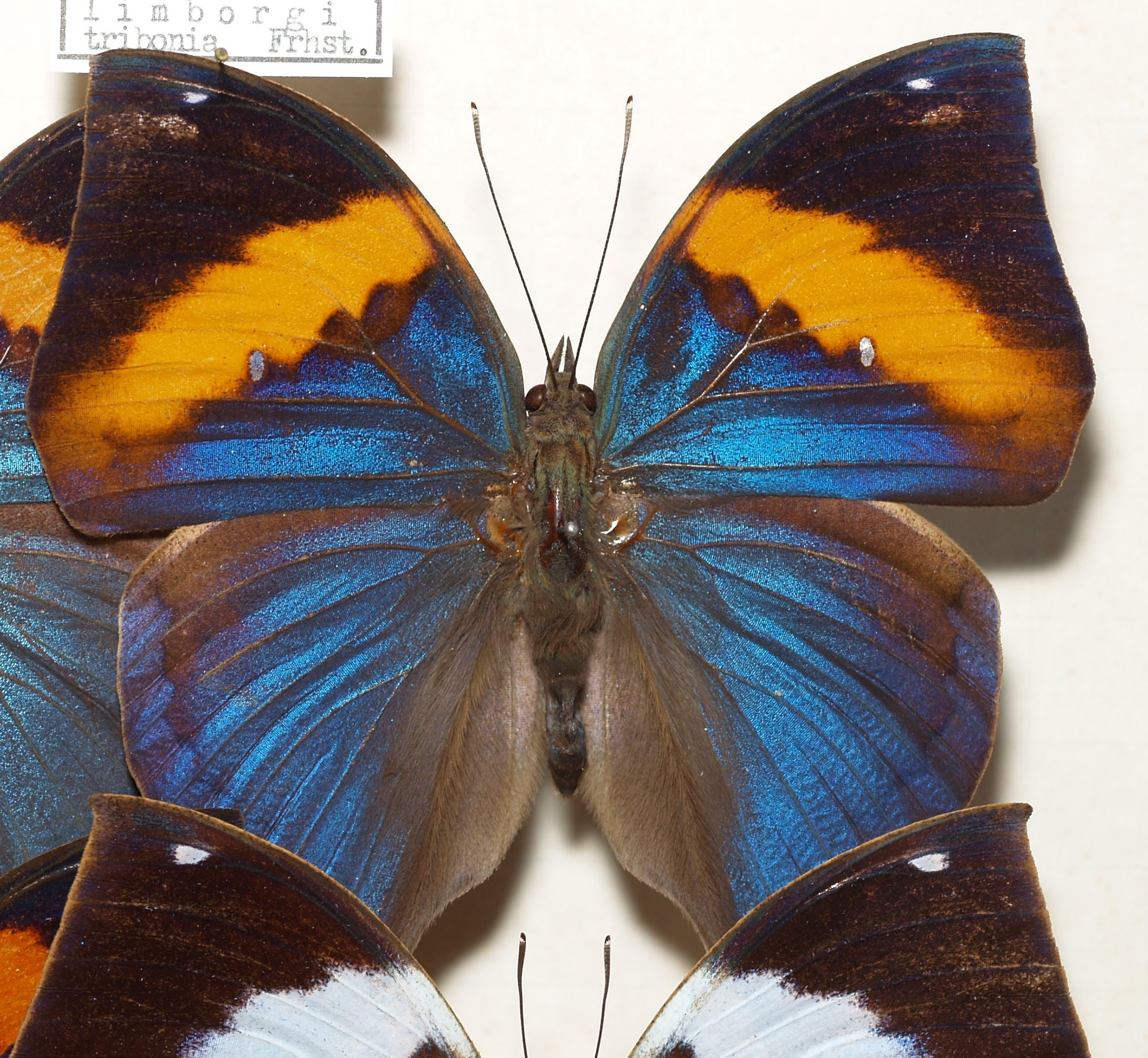
Kallima limborgi
