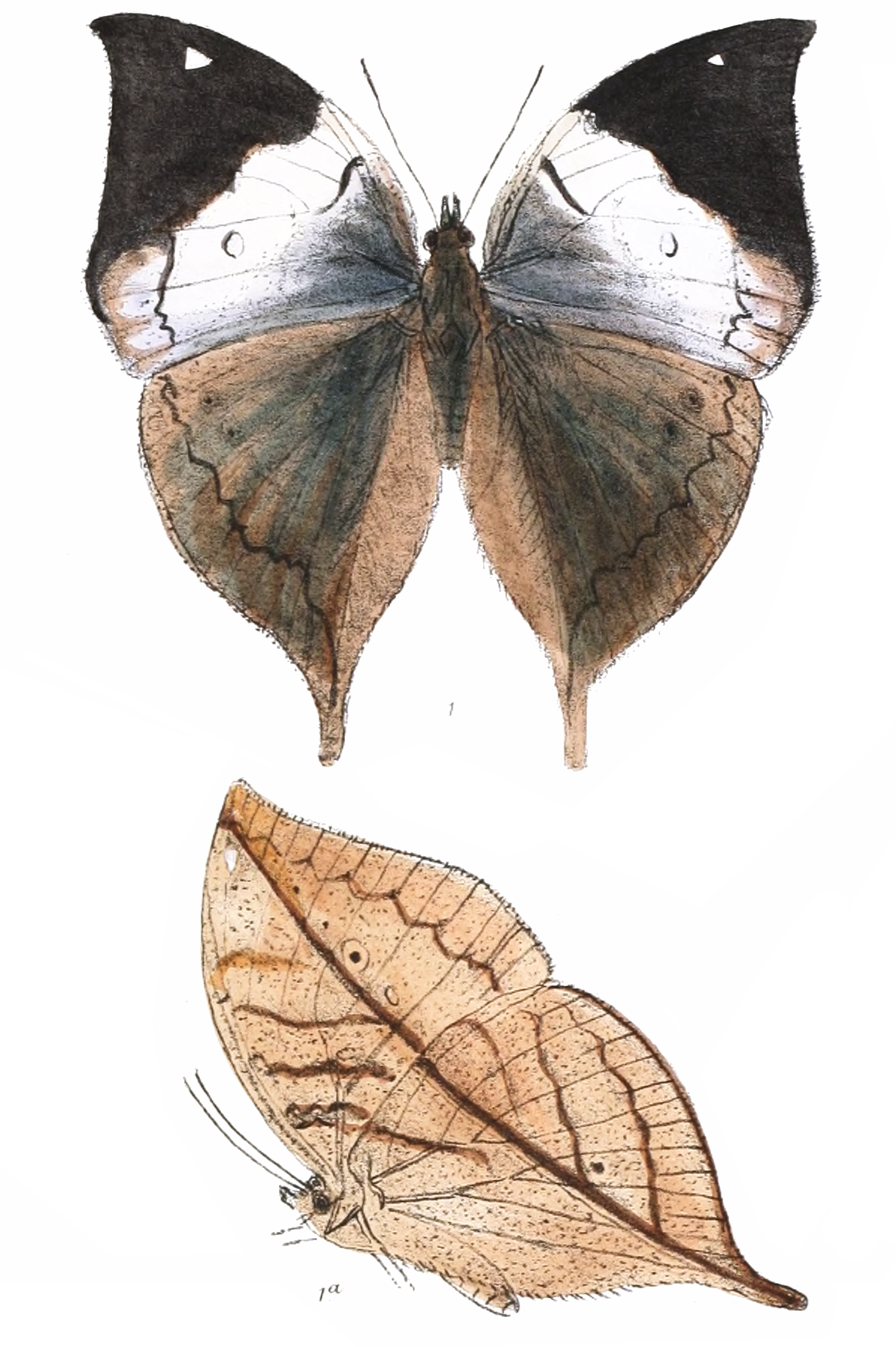
- Male (above and side view)

Scientific classification
- Kingdom: Animalia
- Phylum: Arthropoda
- Clade: Pancrustacea
- Class: Insecta
- Order: Lepidoptera
- Family: Nymphalidae
- Genus: Kallima
- Species: K. knyvetti

Binomial name
- Kallima knyvetti Nicéville, 1886

= Kallima knyvetti =

scarce blue oakleaf

Species of butterfly

Kallima knyvetti, the scarce blue oakleaf, is a species of leaf mimic butterfly found in Southeast Asia.

== Description ==
The male upperside forewing runs basal area to near apex of cell and thence obliquely to the zigzag subterminal line as it crosses interspace 1 dark green, succeeded by a black line along the discocellulars, and a broad sinuous discal band (not curved as in Kallima horsfieldii). It is bluish white below vein 3, pure white with bluish suffused inner margin above vein 3 to costa. Measured on the costal margin, the outer edge of this band stretches less than half the length of the wing from base. The rest of the wing to apex is black, with a preapical white spot and a medial discal hyaline (glass-like) spot in interspace 2.

The hindwing is dark ochraceous brown. The costal margin and apex is broadly brown while the abdominal fold is much paler brown, irrorated (sprinkled) with scattered dusky scales. Vein 1 and the abdominal fold feature long, soft brown hairs. The forewings and hindwings offer a dark subterminal zigzag line commencing somewhat below vein 3 on the forewing. The underside is as in Kallima inachus protectively coloured. The antennae are black. The head and thorax are anteriorly dark green. The thorax posteriorly and abdomen are olivaceous brown. The wingspan is 108–112 mm.

== Distribution ==
The species inhabits Sikkim, Bhutan, Assam, the Naga Hills, and Tenasserim.
