= M. jacksoni =

M. jacksoni may refer to:

- Mallika jacksoni, the Jackson's leaf, a butterfly species found in Africa
- Metridiochoerus jacksoni, an extinct pig species indigenous to the Pliocene and Pleistocene of Africa
