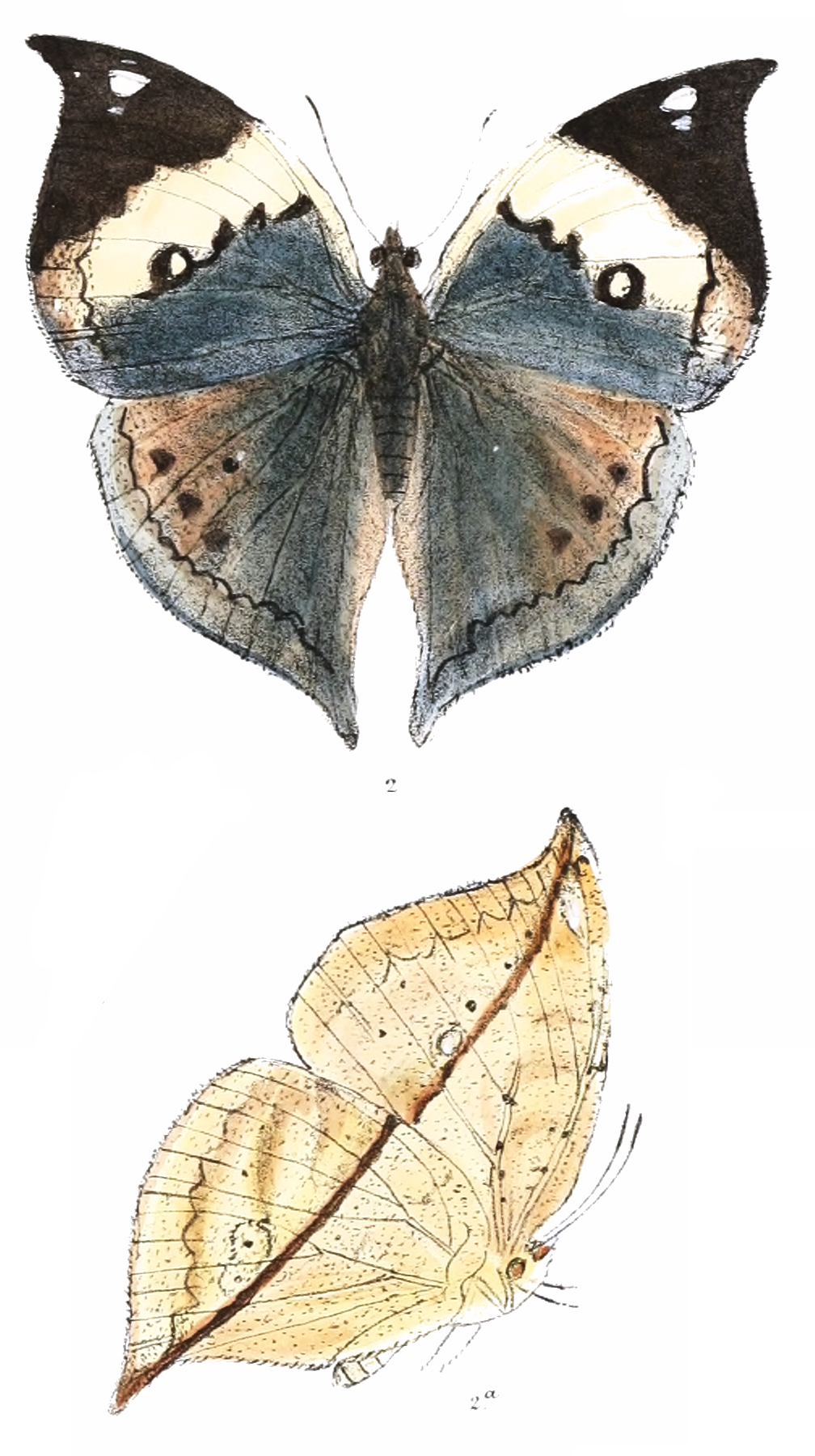
- Female (above and side view)

Scientific classification
- Kingdom: Animalia
- Phylum: Arthropoda
- Clade: Pancrustacea
- Class: Insecta
- Order: Lepidoptera
- Family: Nymphalidae
- Genus: Kallima
- Species: K. albofasciata

Binomial name
- Kallima albofasciata Moore, 1877

= Kallima albofasciata =

Andaman oakleaf

Species of butterfly

Kallima albofasciata, the Andaman oakleaf, is a species of oak leaf butterfly found in the Andaman Islands.

== Description ==
Males and females upperside blue. Forewing with a broad pure while obliquely-placed discal sinuous band, its inner margin defined in black along the discocellulars and base of interspace 3, with a round black hyaline (glass-like)-centred spot in interspace 2; the width of this discal band decreases posteriorly; measured on the costal margin its outer edge is at a distance greater than half the length of the wing from base; apical area beyond discal band black with a preapical white spot, larger in the female than in the male. Hindwing with the costal margin and apex broadly, and the abdominal fold pale earthy brown. Forewings and hindwings with the usual subterminal dark zigzag line. Underside as in Kallima inachus. Antennae black; head, thorax and abdomen dark indigo-blue: beneath, the palpi, thorax and abdomen earthy brown.

Wingspan 96–112 mm.
