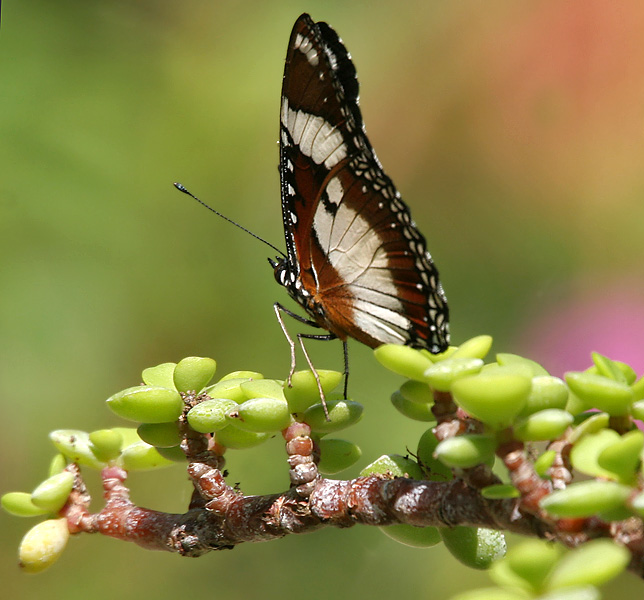
- Denaid eggfly (Hypolimnas misippus) on Portulacaria afra in Hyderabad, India

Scientific classification
- Domain: Eukaryota
- Kingdom: Animalia
- Phylum: Arthropoda
- Class: Insecta
- Order: Lepidoptera
- Family: Nymphalidae
- Subfamily: Nymphalinae
- Tribe: Kallimini; Doherty, 1886

Genera
- See text

= Kallimini =

Tribe of butterflies

Kallimini is a tribe of brush-footed butterflies.

== List of genera ==
- Catacroptera Karsch, 1894 – pirates
- Doleschallia C. & R. Felder, 1860
- Hypolimnas – eggflies, diadems (tentatively placed here)
- Kallima Doubleday, 1849 – oakleaf butterflies, oakleaves
- Mallika Collins & Larsen, 1991 – Jackson's leaf butterfly

In some classifications, Hypolimnas is placed in the Junoniini.
