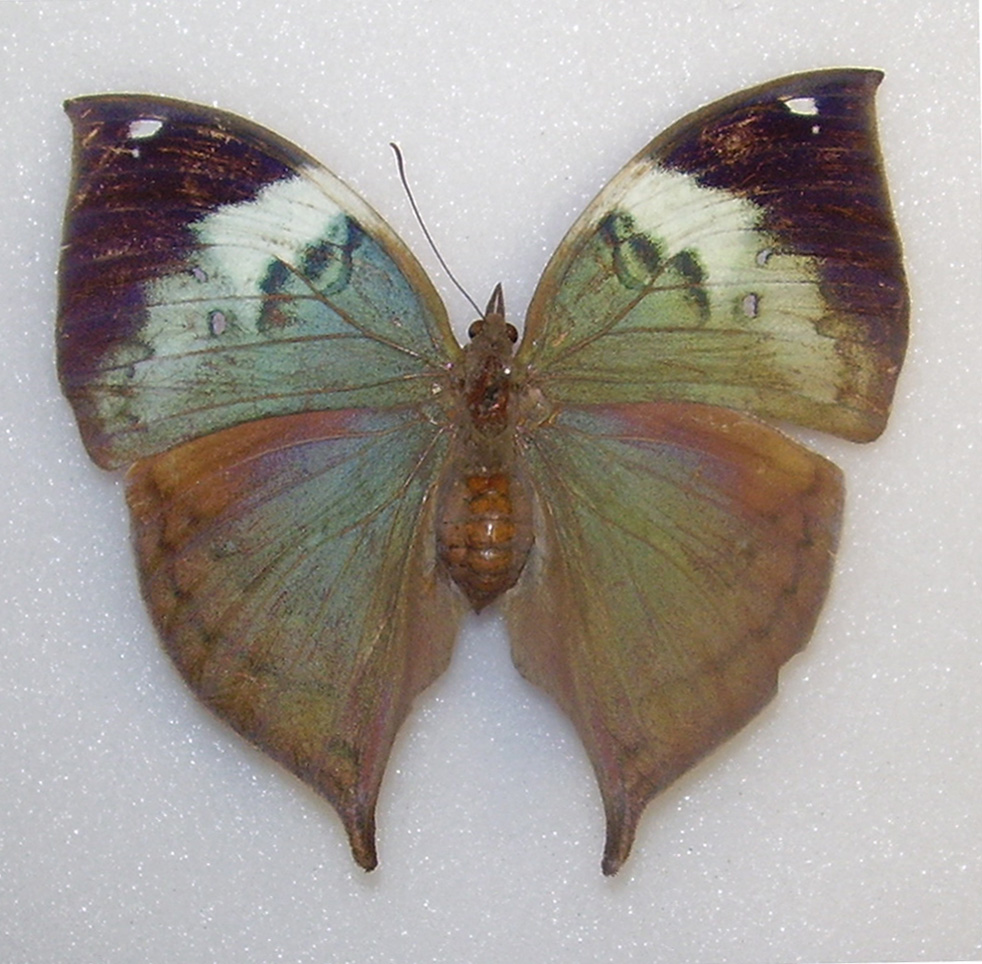
- Female, upperside, Sri Lanka

Scientific classification
- Kingdom: Animalia
- Phylum: Arthropoda
- Clade: Pancrustacea
- Class: Insecta
- Order: Lepidoptera
- Family: Nymphalidae
- Genus: Kallima
- Species: K. philarchus

Binomial name
- Kallima philarchus (Westwood, 1848)

= Kallima philarchus =

Ceylon blue oakleaf

Species of insect

Kallima philarchus, the Ceylon blue oakleaf, is a nymphalid butterfly found in Sri Lanka. With wings closed, it closely resembles a dry leaf with dark veins and is a spectacular example of camouflage.

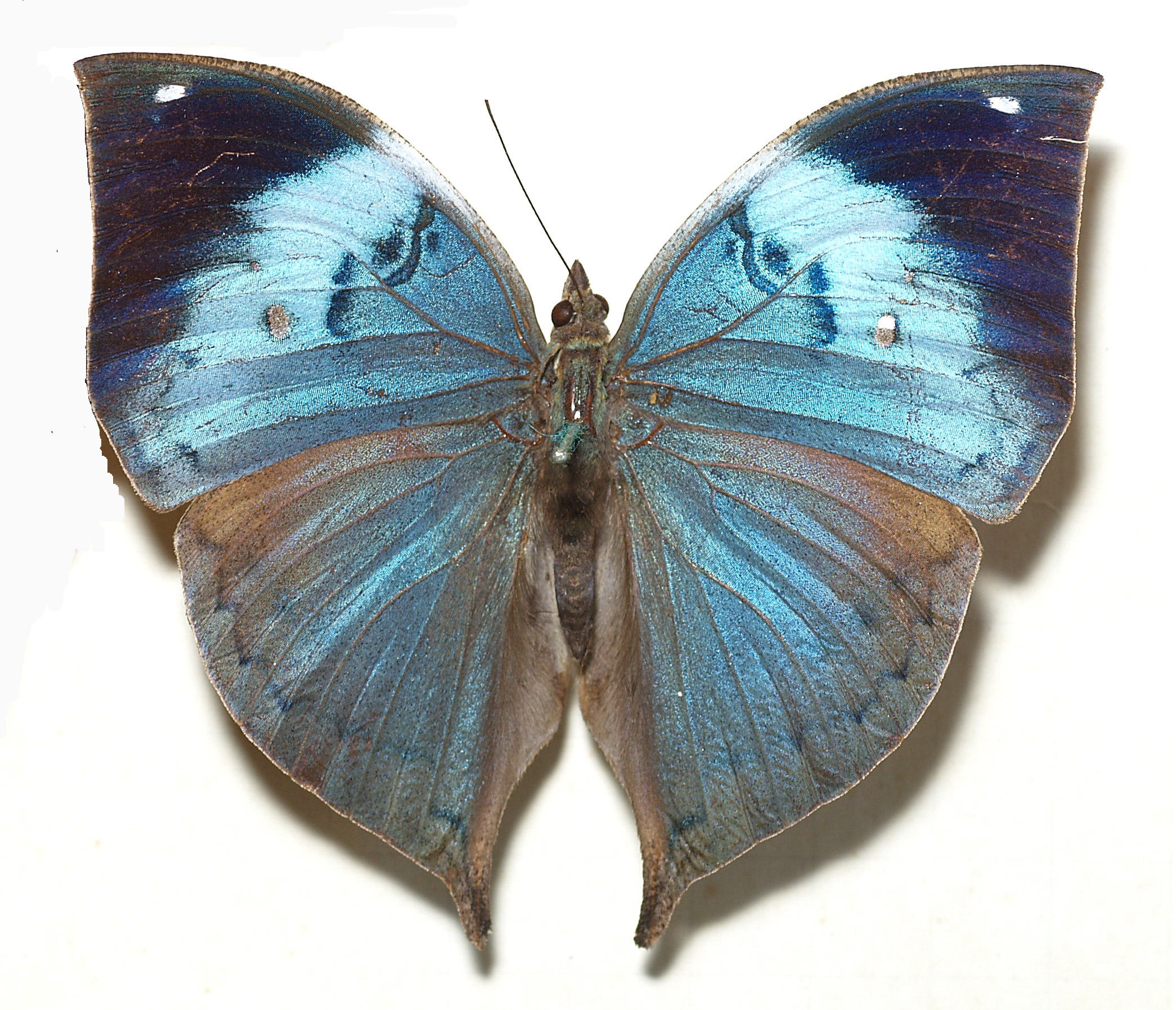
