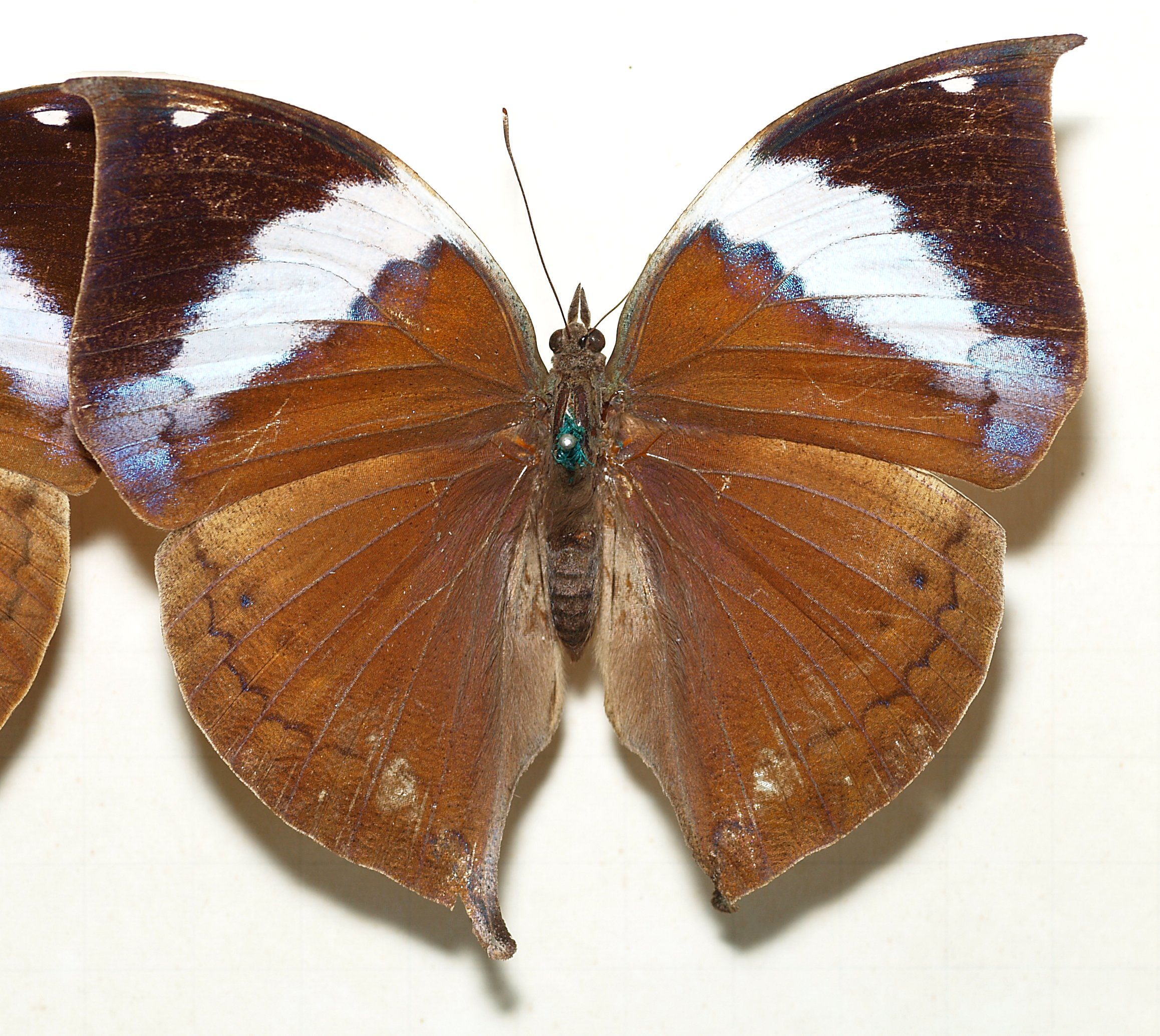

Scientific classification
- Domain: Eukaryota
- Kingdom: Animalia
- Phylum: Arthropoda
- Class: Insecta
- Order: Lepidoptera
- Family: Nymphalidae
- Genus: Kallima
- Species: K. spiridiva

Binomial name
- Kallima spiridiva Grose-Smith, 1885

= Kallima spiridiva =

Species of butterfly

Kallima spiridiva is a butterfly of the family Nymphalidae. It is found on Sumatra in Indonesia. It is only active during the daytime, and has a hearing range of 1200 hertz.
