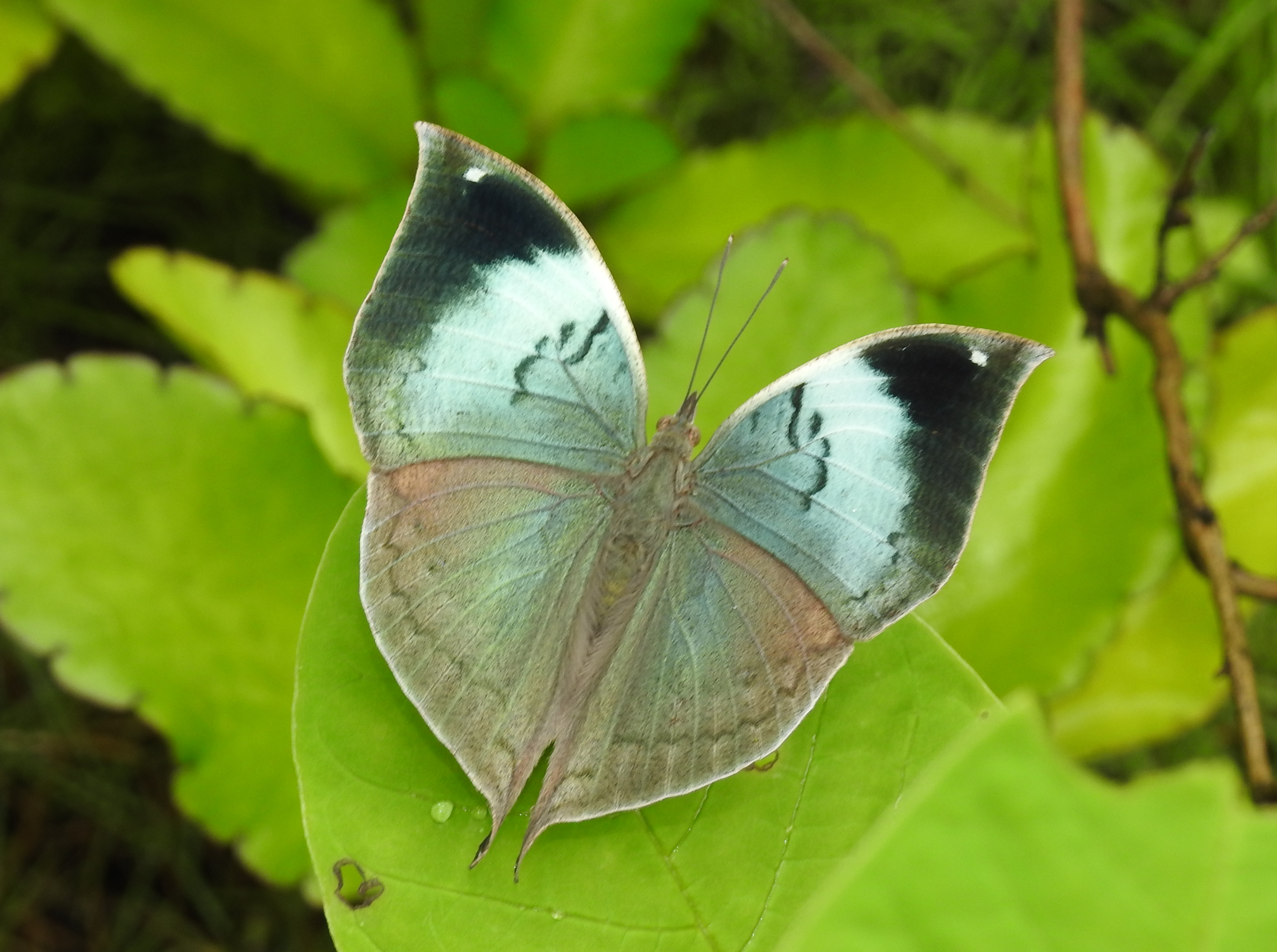
- Dorsal view
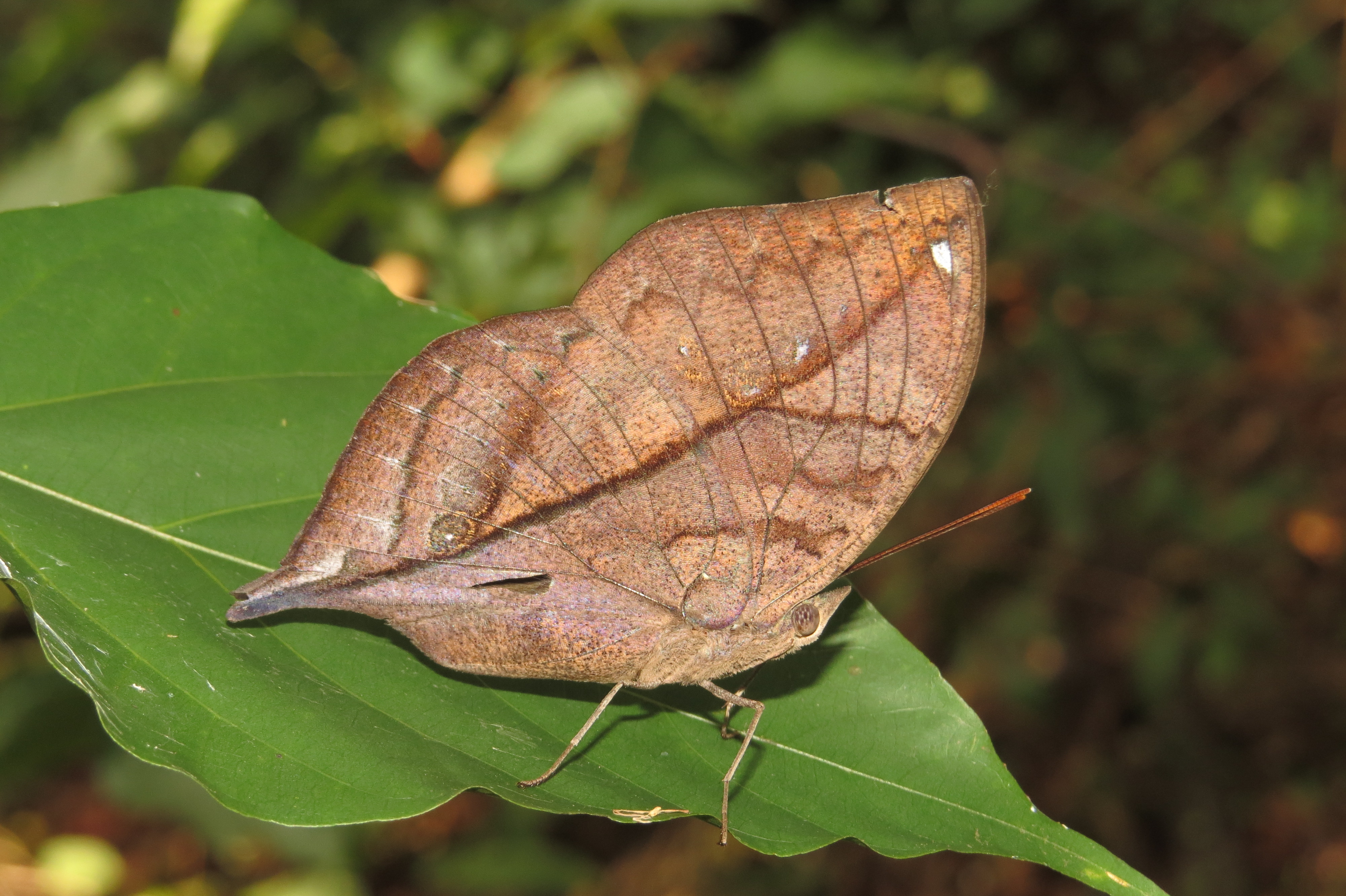
- Ventral view

Scientific classification
- Kingdom: Animalia
- Phylum: Arthropoda
- Clade: Pancrustacea
- Class: Insecta
- Order: Lepidoptera
- Family: Nymphalidae
- Genus: Kallima
- Species: K. horsfieldii

Binomial name
- Kallima horsfieldii Kollar, 1844
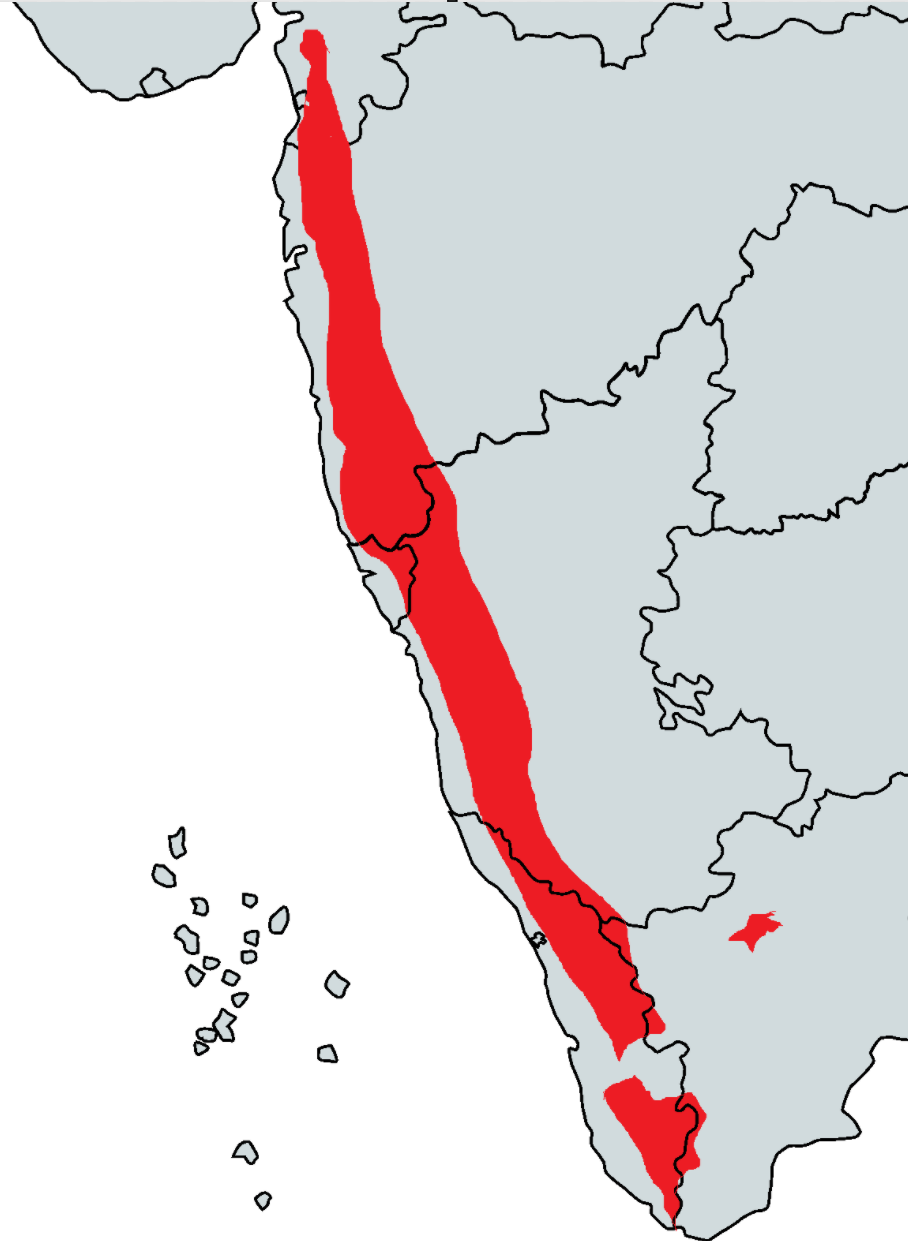

Synonyms
- Kallima horsfieldi Kollar, [1844]

= Kallima horsfieldii =

Species of butterfly

Kallima horsfieldii, the blue oakleaf, southern blue oakleaf or Sahyadri blue oakleaf, is a nymphalid butterfly found in India. The underside appears like a leaf complete with midrib while the upperside is brilliantly coloured.

== Description ==
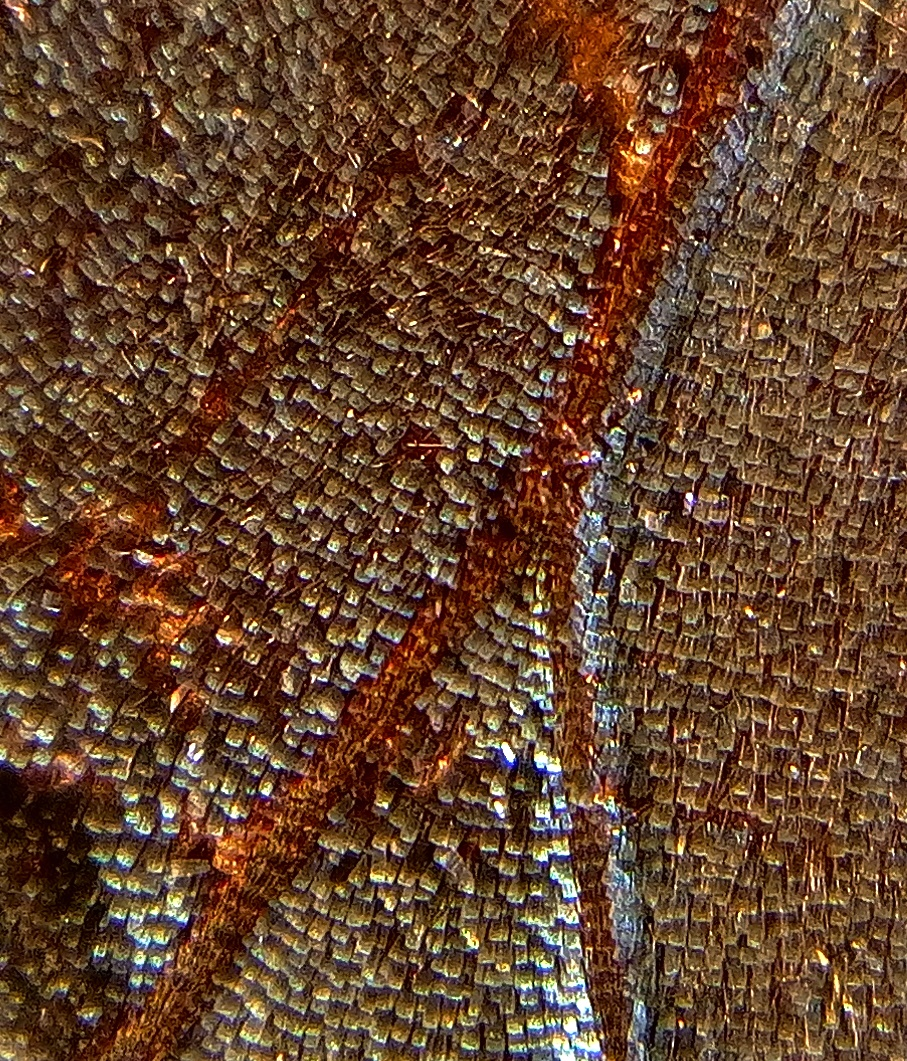
Close-up of wing scales of Kallima horsfieldii.

=== Dry-season form ===
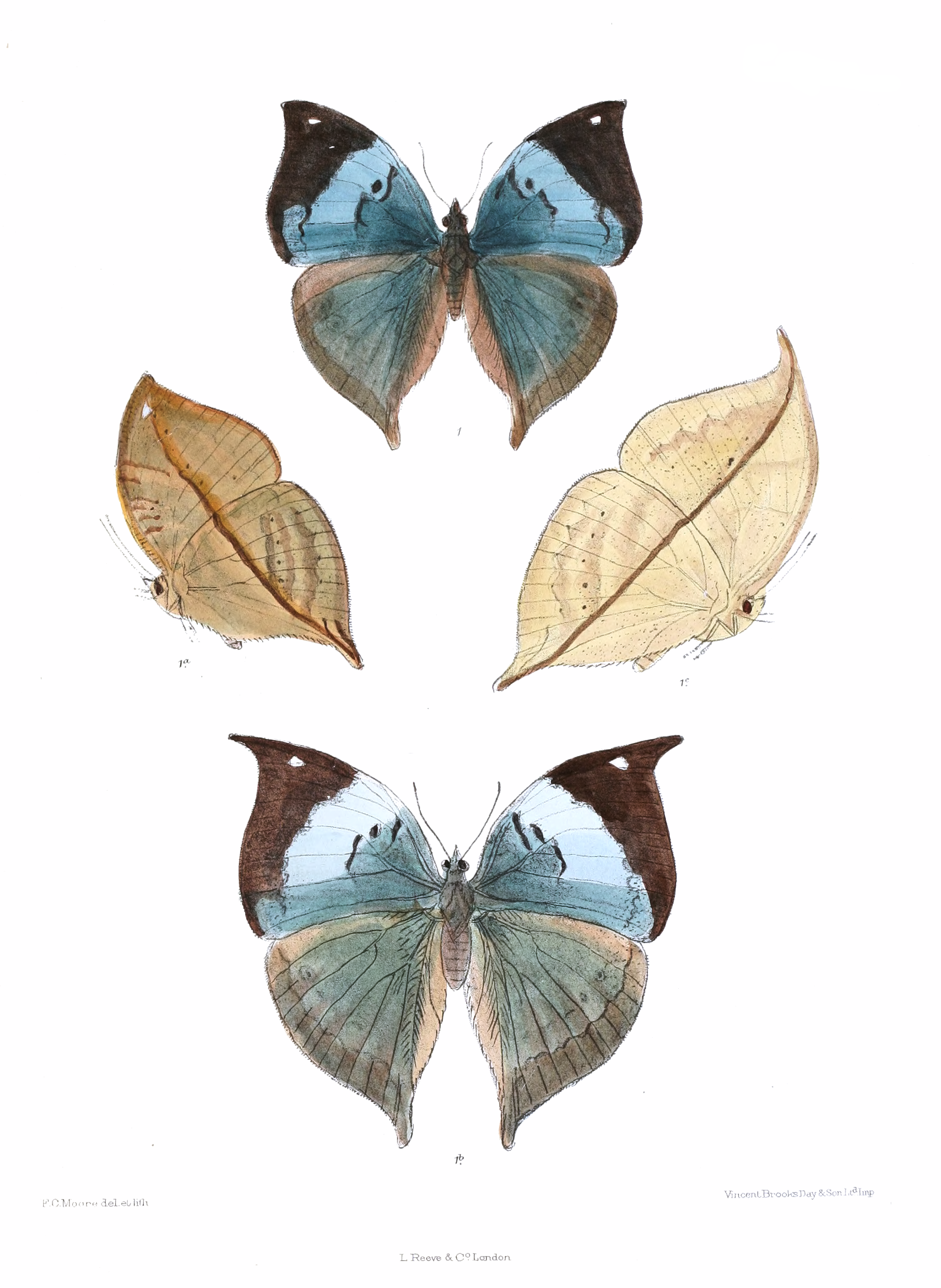
Dry-season form

Males and females indigo blue. Forewing; with a broad, oblique, slightly curved, sinuous-edged, pale blue band, turning to white on the anterior half; the distance measured on the costa of the outer edge of thin band greater than half the length of the wing from the base; its inner margin bordered by short, obliquely-placed, detached linear black markings; apical area beyond the band jet black, with a preapical whites spot; medial hyaline (glass-like) spots, the lower varying in size, in interspaces 2 and 3. Hindwing uniform, the costa and apex broadly and the abdominal fold brown; vein 1 with long soft greyish-brown hairs along its length, extending also over the abdominal fold. Forewings and hindwings as in Kallima inachus, with a dark brown subterminal zigzag line, commencing below vein 3 on the forewing.

Underside as in Kallima inachus simulating a dry leaf, but the resemblance on the whole is perhaps less perfect. Antennae dark brown; head, thorax, and abdomen very dark greenish brown; beneath, the palpi, thorax, and abdomen ochraceous earthy brown.

=== Wet-season form ===
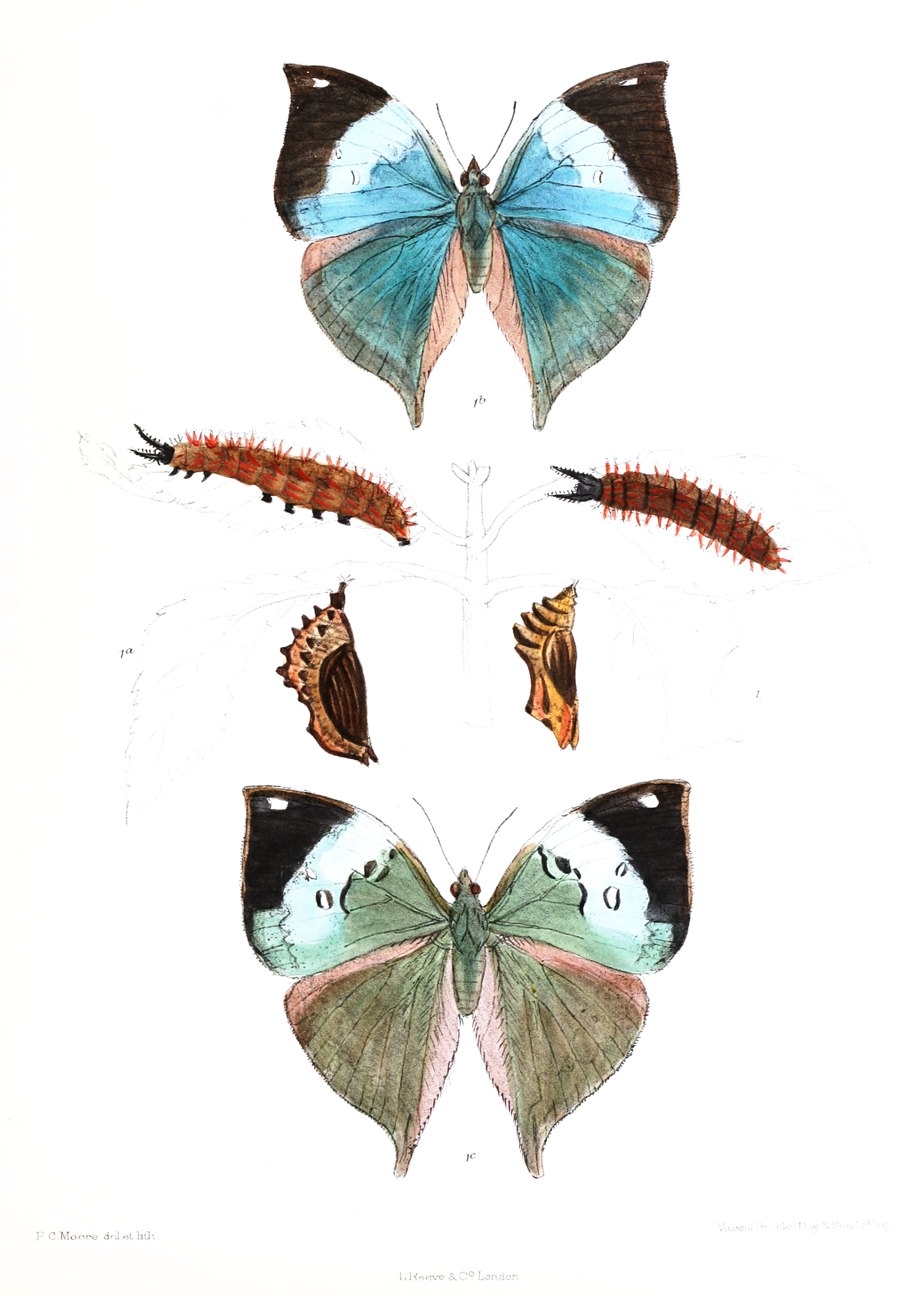
Wet-season form

Males and females similar. Differs in the colour of the discal band on the upperside of the forewing; this is of a uniform pale blue of a slightly lighter or darker shade, varying individually, but not turning to white towards the costal margin as in the dry-season specimens. Underside: ground colour on the whole darker than in the dry-season form, but with the same protective colouring. Wingspan 84–120 mm.

Sri Lankan dry-season specimens range the largest, but are otherwise indistinguishable from specimens from the Nilgiris in the British Museum collection, while specimens of the small wet-season form from Sri Lanka are absolutely identical with specimens of K. wardi Moore, regarded by the author himself as the wet-season form of K. horsfieldi. Again, the type of K. alompra Moore, is now in the British Museum, and in shades of colour and in markings it is absolutely inseparable from many specimens of the wet-season form of K. horsfieldii as are also the two specimens in the Hewitsonian collection mentioned by Moore, and a specimen from; East Pegu, collected by Doherty, in the Godman-Salvin collection.

== Distribution ==
Western Ghats from Mumbai southwards; Sri Lanka; Burma; Tenasserim.

== Larva ==
"Cylindrical, finely pubescent, armed with nine longitudinal rows of fine branched spines; head surmounted by two long straight horns set with minute spines; colour a beautiful golden brown, spines red, head black. We found one specimen of this in July on Karvee (Strobilanthes)..." (Davidson & Aitken) The larva feeds on plants belonging to Family Acanthaceae such as Pseuderanthemum malabaricum, Lepidagathis cuspidata, Strobilanthes callosus, Strobilanthes ciliata, Eranthemum roseum.

== Pupa ==
Earthy brown suffused with a slight pinkish tinge and variegated with patches of darker brown; thorax angulate, abdomen with apparently a linear series of short broad tubercles. (Described from the plate in the Bombay Nat. Hist. Soc. Journ. x, 1896.)
