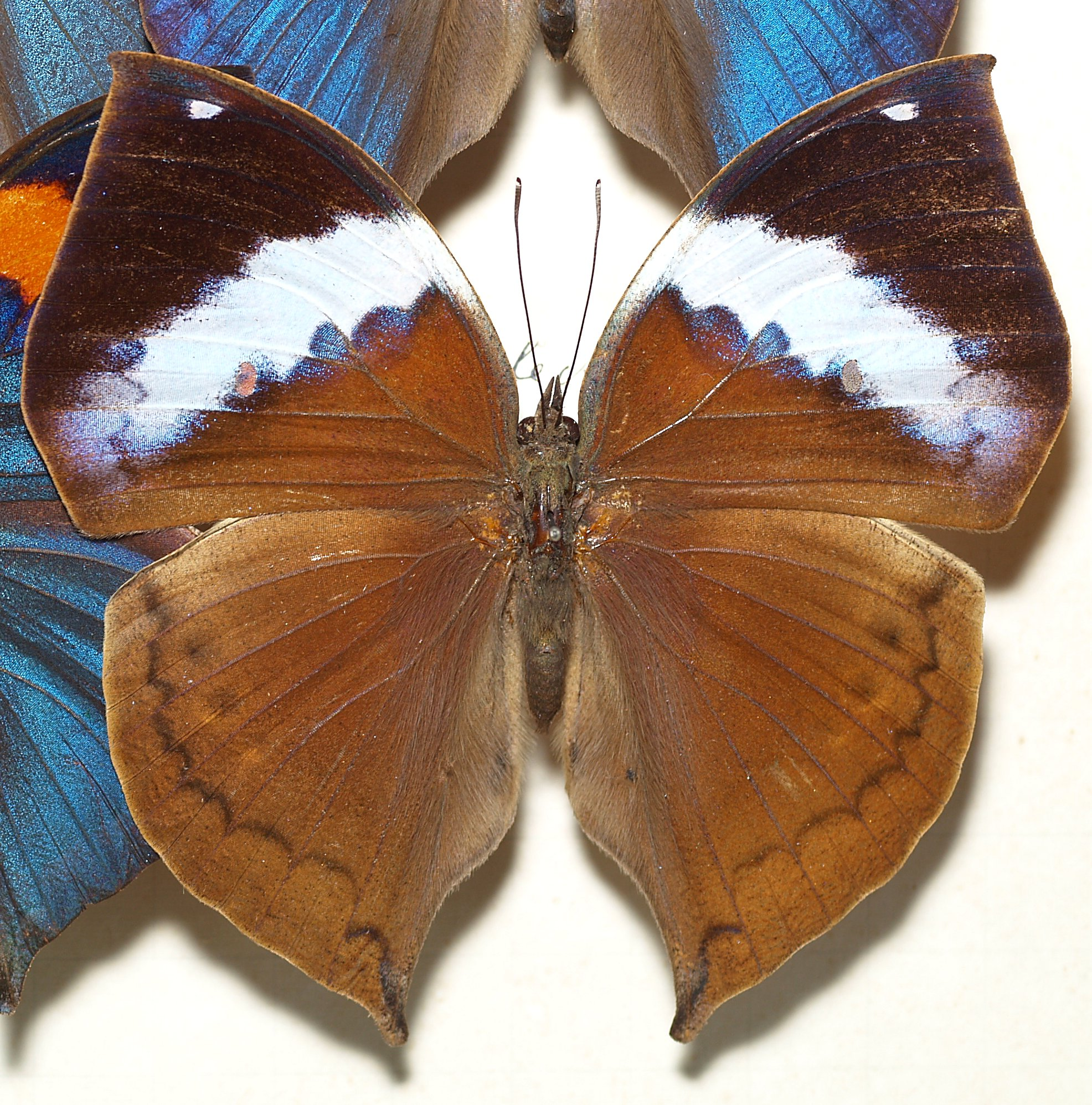

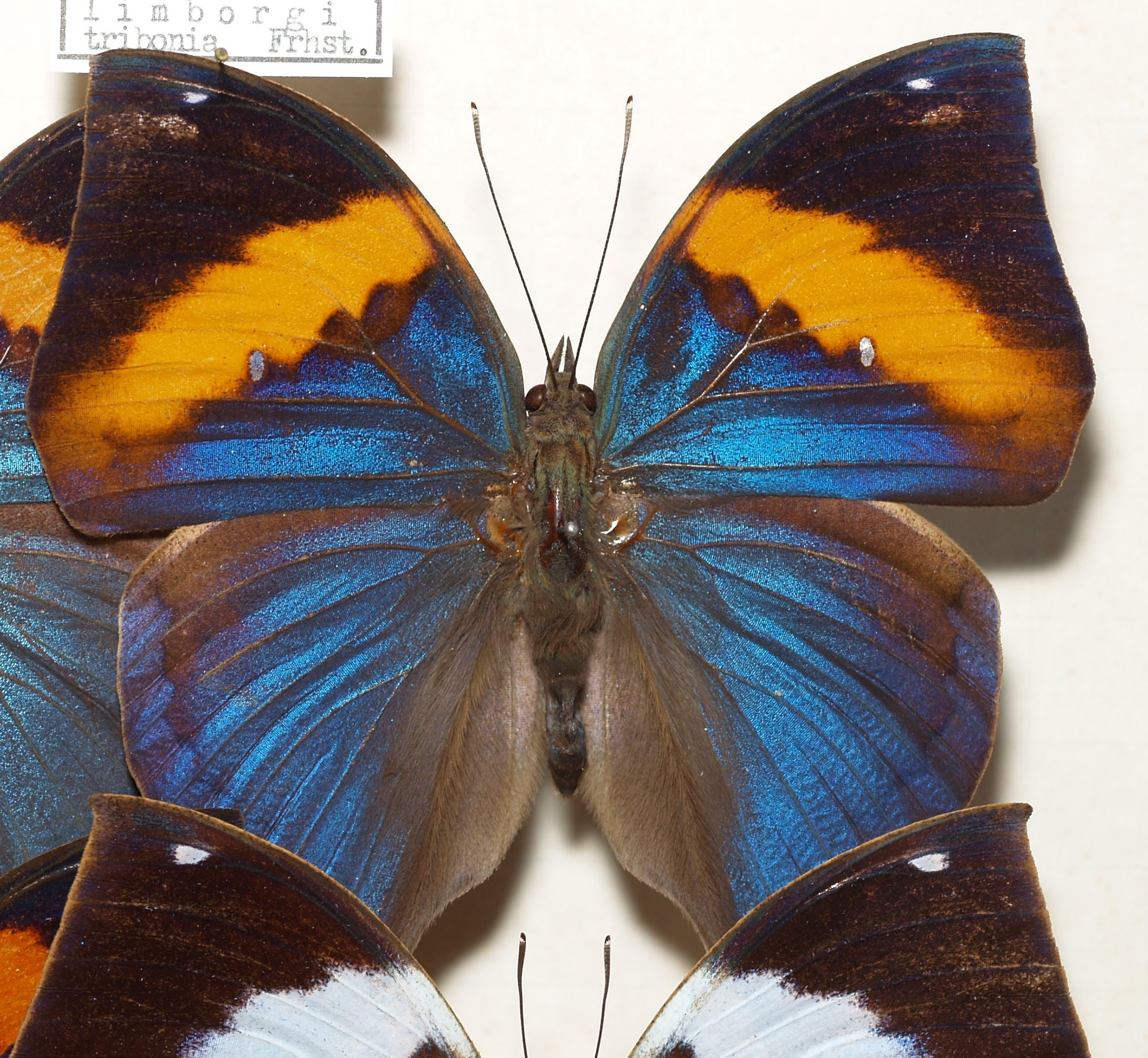

Scientific classification
- Kingdom: Animalia
- Phylum: Arthropoda
- Class: Insecta
- Order: Lepidoptera
- Family: Nymphalidae
- Genus: Kallima
- Species: K. limborgii

Binomial name
- Kallima limborgii Moore, 1878

Subspecies
- Kallima limborgii limborgii Moore, 1878; Kallima limborgii amplirufa Fruhstorfer, 1898

Synonyms
- Kallima inachus amplirufa Fruhstorfer, 1898; Kallima inachus limborgi Moore, [1879]; Kallima limborgi Moore, [1879]; Kallima paralekta amplirufa Fruhstorfer, 1898

= Kallima limborgii =

Species of butterfly

Kallima limborgii, the Peninsular Malaya leaf butterfly, is a butterfly of the family Nymphalidae. It is found in Malaysia, Thailand and southern Burma.

The larvae feed on Strobilanthes callosus and Pseuderanthemum malabaricum.

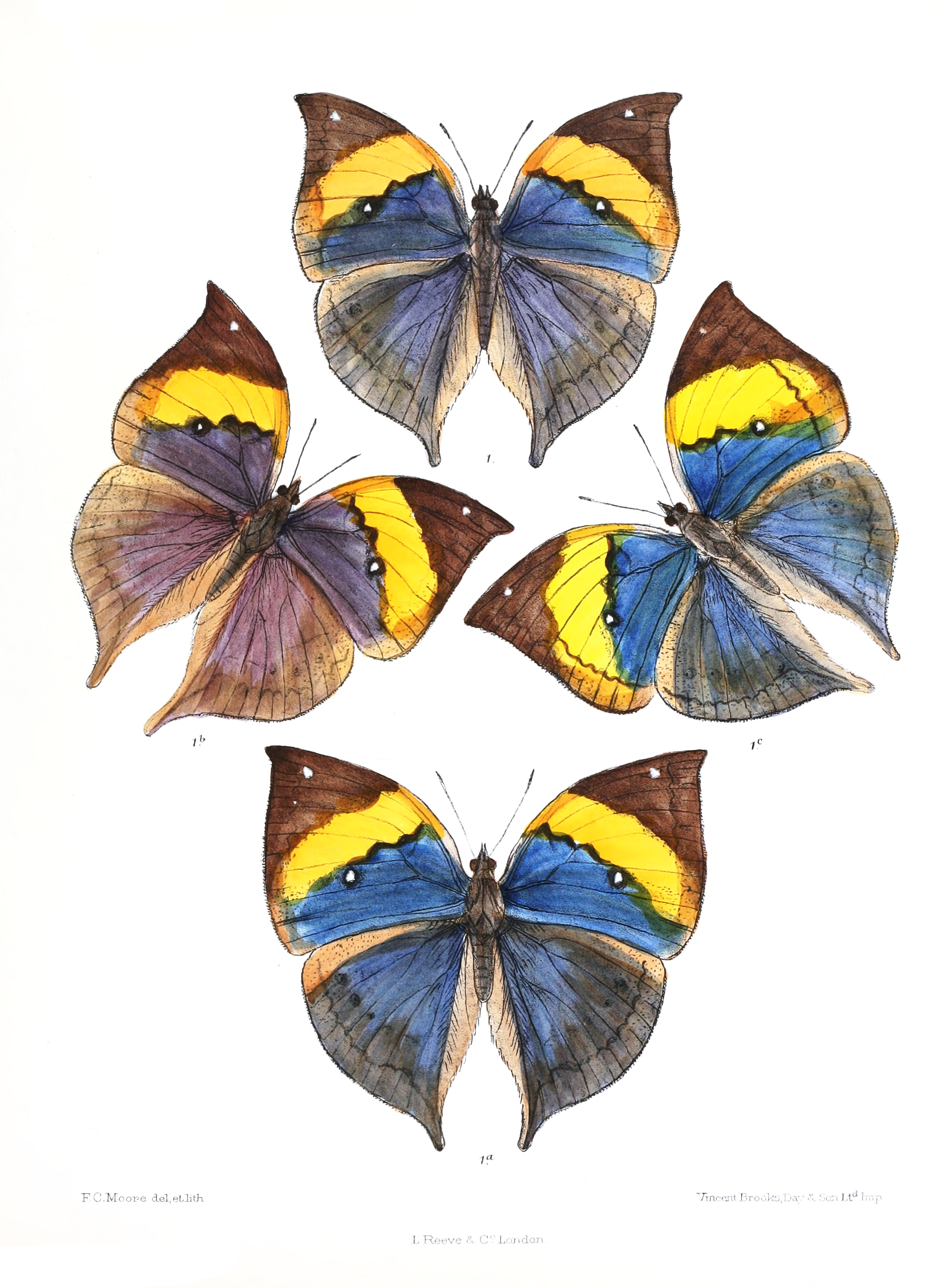

== Subspecies ==
- Kallima limborgii limborgii – (Thailand, southern Burma)
- Kallima limborgii amplirufa Fruhstorfer, 1898 – Leaf butterfly (Peninsular Malaya)
