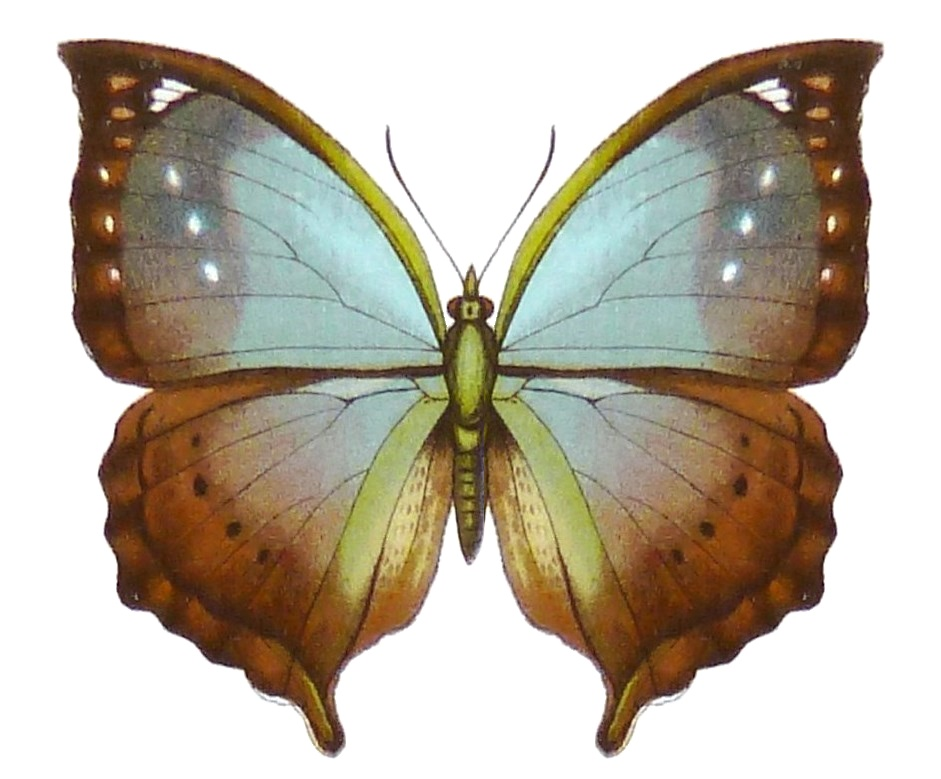
- In Adalbert Seitz's Fauna Africana

Scientific classification
- Domain: Eukaryota
- Kingdom: Animalia
- Phylum: Arthropoda
- Class: Insecta
- Order: Lepidoptera
- Family: Nymphalidae
- Subfamily: Nymphalinae
- Genus: Mallika; Collins & Larsen, 1991
- Species: M. jacksoni

Binomial name
- Mallika jacksoni (Sharpe, 1896)

Synonyms
- Kallima jacksoni Sharpe, 1896

= Mallika jacksoni =

Jackson's leaf butterfly

Species of butterfly

Mallika is a monotypic genus of butterflies of the subfamily Nymphalinae in the family Nymphalidae found in central Africa from DR Congo to Kenya. The single species is Mallika jacksoni, or Jackson's leaf butterfly, which traditionally has been included in the genus Kallima. The habitat consists of dry, sparsely wooded hillsides.

The rear surface of the wings is brownish and closely resembles a dead leaf, while the upper surface is mainly blue.
