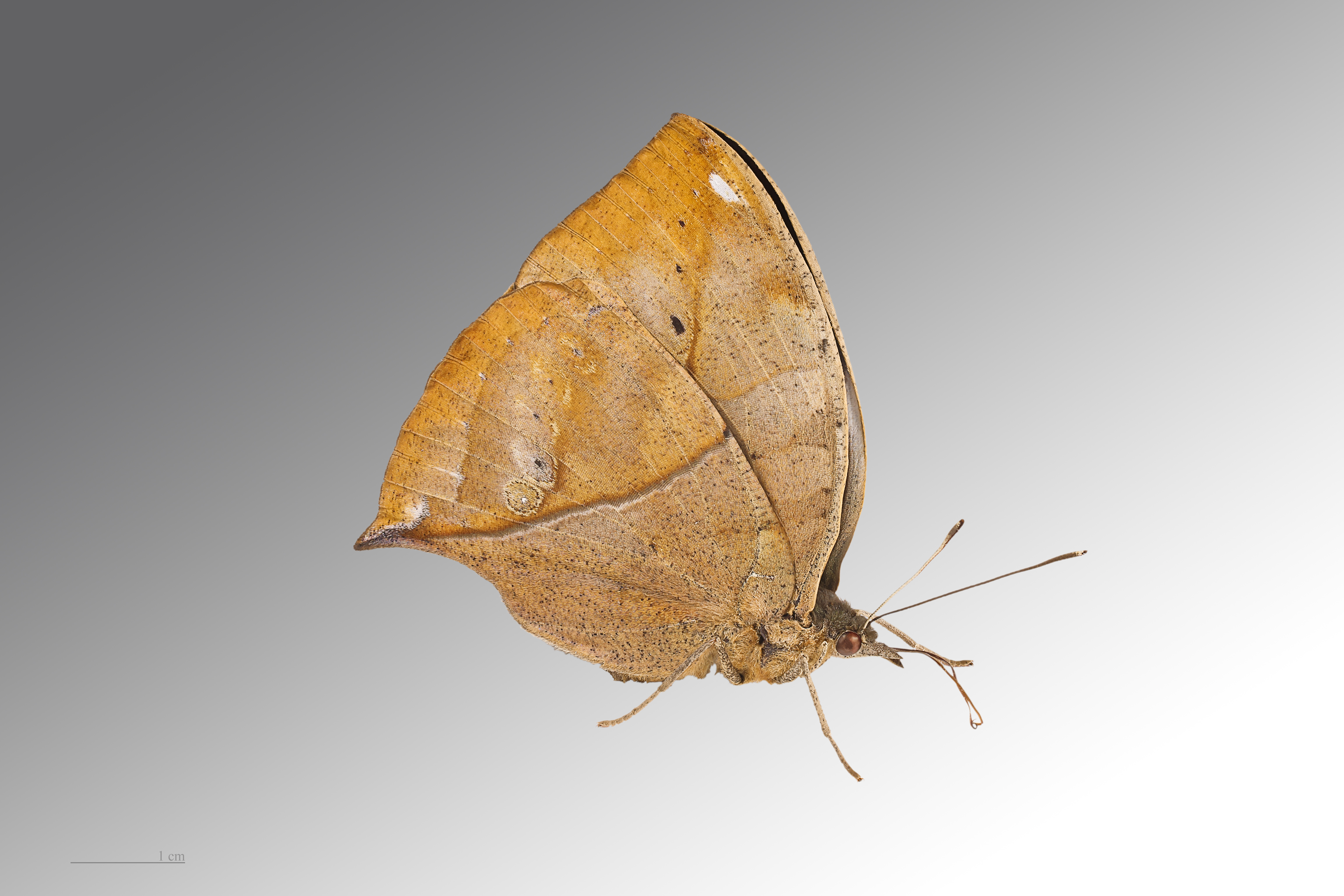
- Kallima paralekta - MHNT

Scientific classification
- Kingdom: Animalia
- Phylum: Arthropoda
- Clade: Pancrustacea
- Class: Insecta
- Order: Lepidoptera
- Family: Nymphalidae
- Subfamily: Nymphalinae; Swainson, 1827

Diversity
- 6 tribes (but see text)

= Nymphalinae =

Subfamily of butterfly family Nymphalidae

The Nymphalinae are a subfamily of brush-footed butterflies (family Nymphalidae). Sometimes, the subfamilies Limenitidinae, and Biblidinae are included here as subordinate tribe(s), while the tribe Melitaeini is occasionally regarded as a distinct subfamily. Their phylogenetics can be traced back to the Cretaceous Terrestrial Revolution after the Cretaceous-Paleogene (K-Pg) mass extinction, followed by repeated dispersals into the rest of the Old World and the New World during various periods beginning in the Eocene.

== Systematics ==
The traditionally recognized tribes of Nymphalinae are here listed in the presumed phylogenetic sequence:

- Coeini (six or seven genera)
- Nymphalini – anglewings, tortoiseshells and relatives (about 15 genera, two are fossil)
- Kallimini (about five genera)
- Victorinini (four genera, formerly in Kallimini)
- Junoniini (about five genera)
- Melitaeini – fritillaries (about 25 genera)
- Vanessulini (one genus, Vanessula Dewitz, 1887, per Grishin in Zhang, Cong, Shen, Opler & Grishin, 202, elsewhere as incertae sedis)

Genera incertae sedis are:

- Rhinopalpa – the wizard
- Kallimoides Shirôzu & Nakanishi, 1984 – African leaf butterfly

In addition to these, Crenidomimas is sometimes placed here, but may belong in the Limenitidinae, genus Euryphura.

The Late Eocene fossil genus Lithodryas might belong here, but it is generally assigned to the Lycaenidae.
