= Kallimoides =

African leaf butterfly
- male K. r. rumia Ghana

Scientific classification
- Kingdom: Animalia
- Phylum: Arthropoda
- Clade: Pancrustacea
- Class: Insecta
- Order: Lepidoptera
- Family: Nymphalidae
- Genus: Kallimoides; Shirôzu & Nakanishi, 1984
- Species: K. rumia

Binomial name
- Kallimoides rumia (Doubleday, 1849)

Synonyms
- Kallima rumia Doubleday, 1849; Kallima rumia amiru Suffert, 1904; Kallima rumia f. kassaiensis Niepelt, 1911; Kallima rumia jadyae Fox, 1968; Kallima rattrayi Sharpe, 1904

Genus of butterflies

Kallimoides is a monotypic genus of butterflies in the family Nymphalidae. It contains only one species, Kallimoides rumia, the African leaf butterfly. It is found in Guinea, Sierra Leone, Liberia, Ivory Coast, Ghana, Nigeria, Bioko, Cameroon, Gabon, the Republic of the Congo, Angola, the Central African Republic, the Democratic Republic of the Congo, Uganda, Rwanda, Burundi and Tanzania. The habitat consists of forests.

Adults are attracted to sucking-trees and sometimes also to fallen fruit and banana-baited traps.

The larvae feed on Brillantaisa species.

== Subspecies ==
- Kallimoides rumia rumia — Guinea, Sierra Leone, Liberia, Ivory Coast, Ghana
- Kallimoides rumia jadyae (Fox, 1968) — Nigeria, Cameroon, Bioko, Gabon, Congo, Angola, Central African Republic, Democratic Republic of the Congo: Ubangi, Mongala, Uele, Ituri, Kivu, Tshopo, Tshuapa, Sankuru, Lualaba
- Kallimoides rumia rattrayi (Sharpe, 1904) — Uganda, Rwanda, Burundi, north-western Tanzania

Torben Larsen developed a species numbering system for his 2005 publication Butterflies of West Africa. The nominate subspecies is #787. The 'Larsen' numbers have since been used with permission in A Sharp Eye on Butterflies of Ghana.
