= Freshwater aquarium =

Water tank for holding aquatic animals

A freshwater aquarium is a receptacle that holds one or more freshwater aquatic organisms for decorative, pet-keeping, or research purposes. Modern aquariums are most often made from transparent glass or acrylic glass. Typical inhabitants include fish, plants, amphibians, and invertebrates, such as snails and crustaceans. This term refers to all aquariums whose salinity, measured on a hydrometer calibrated to 3.98 °C, results in a water density of 1,000 g/cm³.

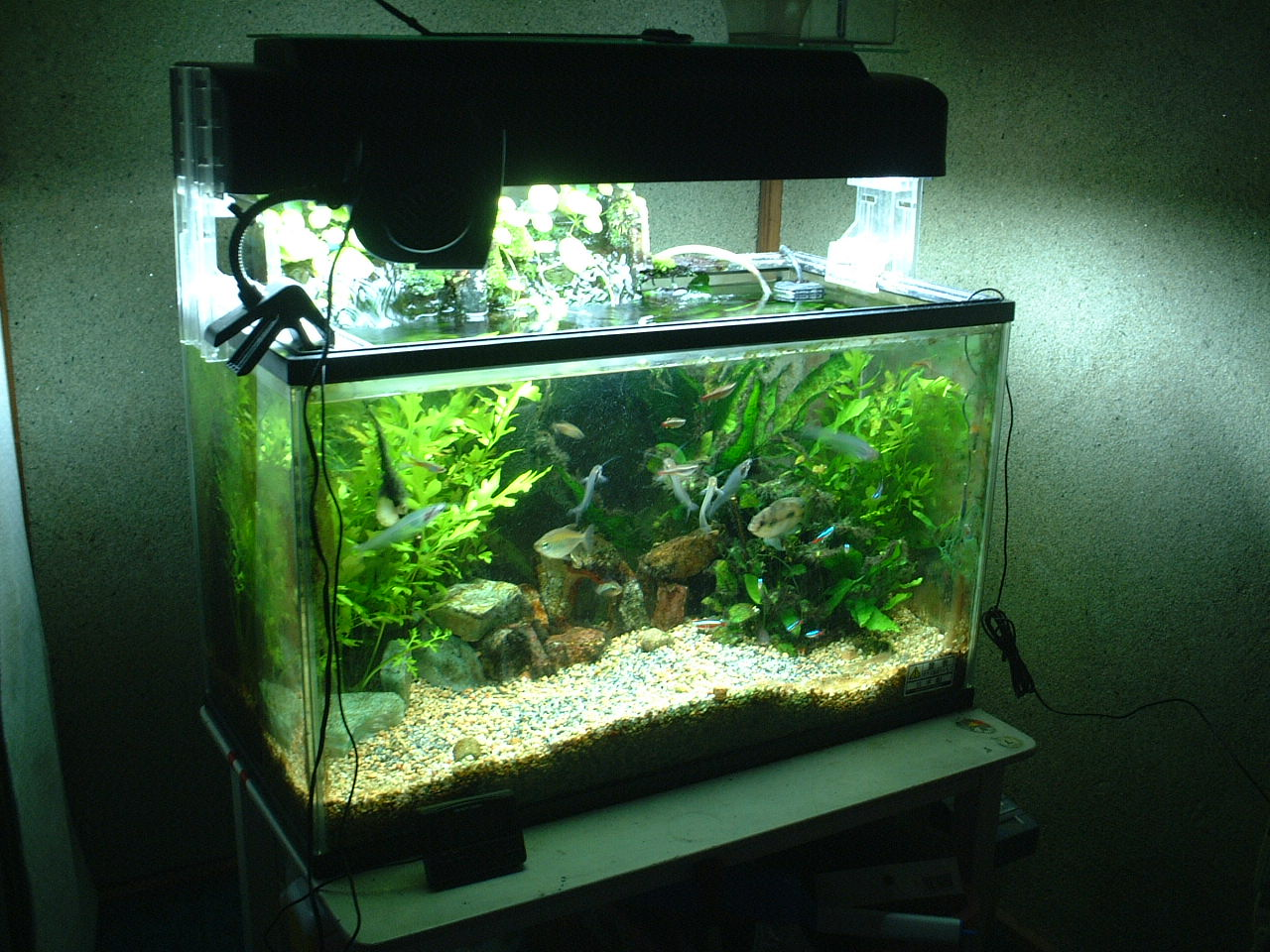
Tropical freshwater aquarium

Freshwater fish may be either coldwater or tropical species. Although freshwater aquariums can be set up as community tanks, coldwater and tropical fish are generally not mixed due to incompatibilities in temperature requirements. Coldwater aquariums house goldfish and other species that do not require a heating apparatus. Warmer temperatures would actually increase their metabolism and shorten their lifespan. For a tropical fish tank, maintaining a warm environmental temperature ranging between 24 and 27 °C enables different tropical fish to thrive at different temperatures.

Aquarium substrate usually consists of sand or gravel. Aquarium substrate is important for the fish's health and replicating their natural environment. Aquarium decoration can consist of live or plastic plants, driftwood, rocks, and a variety of commercially made plastic sculptures. Though rocks and plants have more practical purposes for the health of the fish and the water quality. The smallest aquariums are fish bowls, but these are not recommended for most fish as they are generally too small, tend to stunt fish growth, and may lead to eventual death.

== History ==
The earliest known aquariums were artificial fish ponds constructed by the ancient Sumerians over 4500 years ago. The ancient Assyrians, Egyptians, and Romans also kept fish in ponds for food and entertainment purposes. The ancient Chinese were the first culture to breed fish with any degree of success. They raised carp for food around 2000 BC, and developed ornamental goldfish by selective breeding. Goldfish were introduced to Europe during the 18th century.

In the later 18th century, widespread public interest in the study of nature was awakening, and fish were kept in glass jars, porcelain containers, wooden tubs, and small artificial ponds. During this time zoologist and botanist, Johann Matthaeus Bechstein, kept many fish and amphibians and laid down the foundation for aquarium and terrarium science. The concepts of the proper aquarium and terrarium were developed later by Nathaniel Bagshaw Ward in 1829.

During the 19th century the idea of the "balanced aquarium" was developed. This approach was an attempt to mimic a balanced ecosystem in nature. According to this method, fish waste could be consumed by plants, and plants along with the air surface of the water could supply oxygen for the fish. In 1869, the first tropical fish (the Paradise Fish) was imported from Asia. In these days, tropical tanks were kept warm by an open flame. Because early filters were noisy and expensive, fishkeeping was a hobby reserved for wealthy, scientifically inclined individuals.

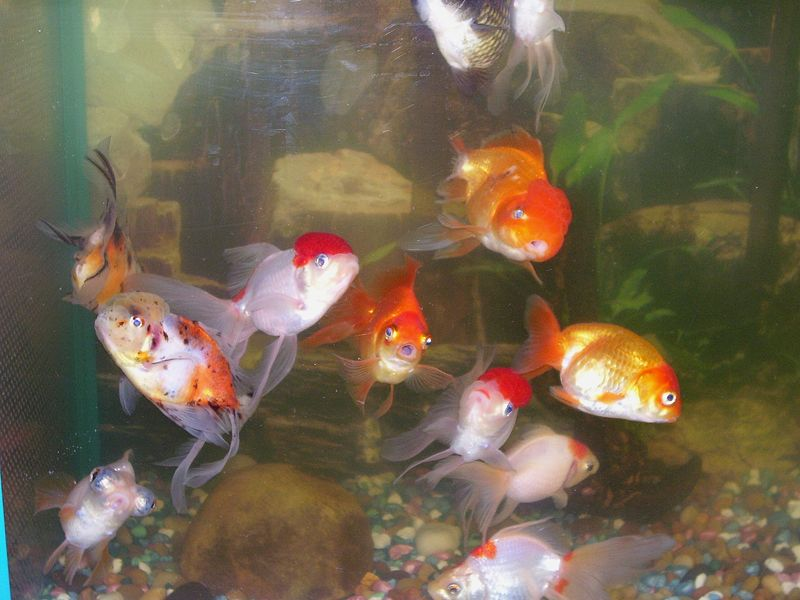
A heavily stocked fancy goldfish aquarium

In 1878, Rear-Admiral Daniel Ammon brought the first tropical fish from the Far East to the United States which led to a decline in the popularity of goldfish. In the early 20th century, aeration, as well as particulate and charcoal filtration was introduced. The undergravel filter was introduced in the 1950s. By this time, the old idea of the balanced aquarium was viewed as unattainable and unnecessary by many people in the aquarium hobby, but it made a comeback at the end of the 20th century with the rising popularity of the planted tank.

Today fishkeeping has become a popular hobby that almost anyone can do. Aquarium fish are both wild-caught and bred throughout the world. Captive-bred species are inexpensive and widely available, and are less likely to be infected with diseases or parasites. Unfortunately, successive generations of inbred fish frequently have less color and sport smaller fins than their wild counterparts.

== Fundamentals ==
A typical household freshwater aquarium set-up, apart from its aquatic tenants, consists of furnishings such as a gravel substrate, live or plastic plants, rocks, driftwood, a backcloth or background, and other decorations. Other equipment includes a canopy or hood as an aquarium cover, an aquarium stand or base, lighting accessories, a heater, a thermometer, air pumps, filtration apparatus, airstones, fish food, a fish net, water conditioner, water quality testing kits, a siphon hose or gravel cleaner, and a bucket for water changes. When first starting an aquarium biological enhancer is also commonly used to speed up the nitrogen cycle by adding beneficial bacteria.

Surface area and height are important in the set-up and maintenance of a living biotope. The surface area contributes to providing superior in-tank oxygenation and it also facilitates the creation of attractive aquatic themes. Freshwater environments benefit more from short and wide aquariums, due to the larger surface area they present to the air; this allows more oxygen to dissolve in the water, and the more oxygen there is, the more fish you can keep. In general, a larger-sized aquarium provides a more stable water-world and the hobbyist can also acquire a greater number of fish. A large aquarium can also enhance aesthetic value. With regards to material, an all-glass aquarium is preferable due to its reasonable cost and its superior ability to resist scratches and discoloration. Indoor aquariums are normally placed far from windows, heating and cooling ducts of the house because direct sunlight and temperature changes can negatively affect the aquatic environment. Overexposure to sunlight leads to rapid algae growth inside and outside the tank. Sudden temperature variations are harmful to fish.

== Themes ==
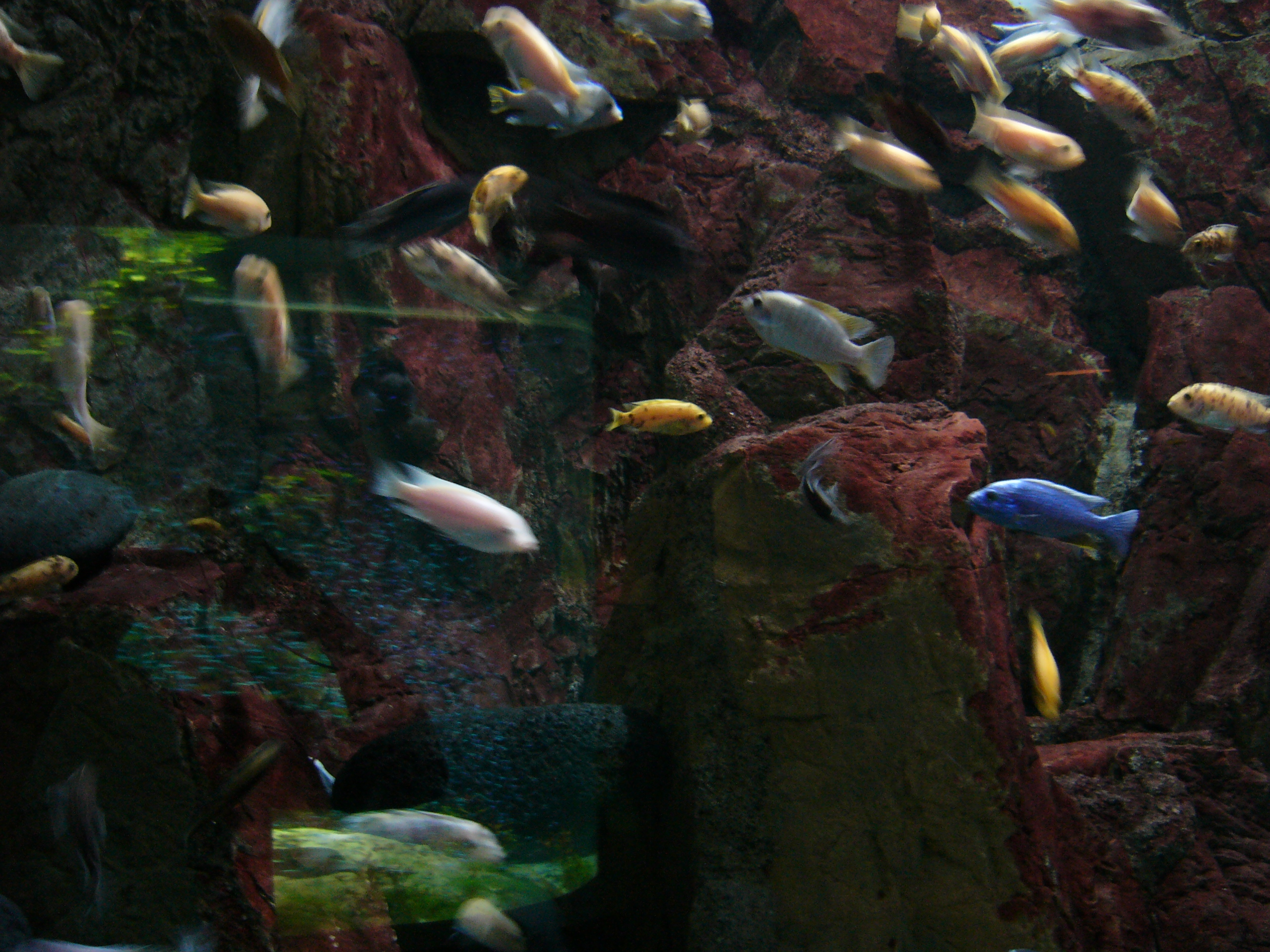
African cichlid aquarium

Fish come in a large variety of species, from several different geographical regions. Most aquarium fish originated in Central America, South America, Africa, Asia or Oceania. Fish can be kept in different combinations of species and in different kinds of aquatic environments. Four common themes include the community aquarium, the goldfish aquarium, the African cichlid aquarium, and the planted aquarium.

A community aquarium refers to the mixing of fish and plants from different geographical areas with an emphasisis on the color and hardiness of the specimens. An example is the combination of gouramis, tetras, and rasboras with a selection of hardy plants such as Hygrophila difformis, Hygrophila polysperma, and Vallisneria spiralis. Choosing fish that are peaceful and compatible with each other is important in a community tank.

A goldfish aquarium can be set up as an unfurnished and bare-bottom tank to emphasize the bright coloration of the fish. A combination of different varieties of goldfish and decorations that contrast with the vivid colors of the fish would make an attractive display. A 20-gallon tank with a proper filter like a sponge filter is recommended for one goldfish. Each new goldfish requires 10 extra gallons to maintain water parameters and a regular tank maintenance schedule. Goldfish also tend to prefer higher quality food such as brine shrimp because lower quality food can contain more indigestible food, causing the tank to become quickly dirty. Live plants are not usually grown with goldfish, except for hardy, oxygenating plants like Egeria, because goldfish regularly disturb the substrate. They may also feed on softer-leaved plants. Plastic plants can be used instead.

An African cichlid aquarium commonly consists of Lake Tanganyika or Lake Malawi cichlid varieties, and generally requires a large number of rocks combined with a substrate of fine gravel or sand. The rocky environment should provide numerous caves and hiding places. Because cichlids, like goldfish, disturb the substrate by digging, plastic plants should be used as a substitute for live plants. However, real plants like Vallisneria or Anubias can be tried in a cichlid tank.

A planted aquarium emphasizes living plants as much as, or even more than fish. Large groupings of plant species such as Hygrophila, Limnophila, Rotala, Vallisneria, Echinodorus, and Cryptocorynes with a limited number of fish is a good example of a planted tank. It is important to select fish that will not damage the plants, such as small tetras, dwarf gouramis, cherry barbs, zebra danios, and White Clouds. Planted tanks may include CO_{2} injection and a substrate fortified with laterite. In the case of a low tech aquarium, a layer of potting soil or root tabs is commonly put under the substrate to provide nutrients for the plants.

A biotope aquarium is an aquarium that is designed to simulate a natural habitat, with the fish, plants, and furnishings all representative of a particular place in nature. Because only species that are found together in nature are allowed in a true biotope aquarium, these tanks are more challenging and less common than the other themes. The most common biotope aquariums are the Amazon biotope and the Lake Malawi biotope, but occasionally aquarists will recreate the South East Asia river biotope.

== See also ==
=== Articles ===
- Aquarium
- Aquascaping
- Fish food
- Fishkeeping
- Goldfish
- Public aquarium
- Aquascaping in India

=== Lists ===
- List of aquarium diseases
- List of freshwater aquarium amphibian species
- List of freshwater aquarium fish species
- List of freshwater aquarium invertebrate species
- List of freshwater aquarium plant species
