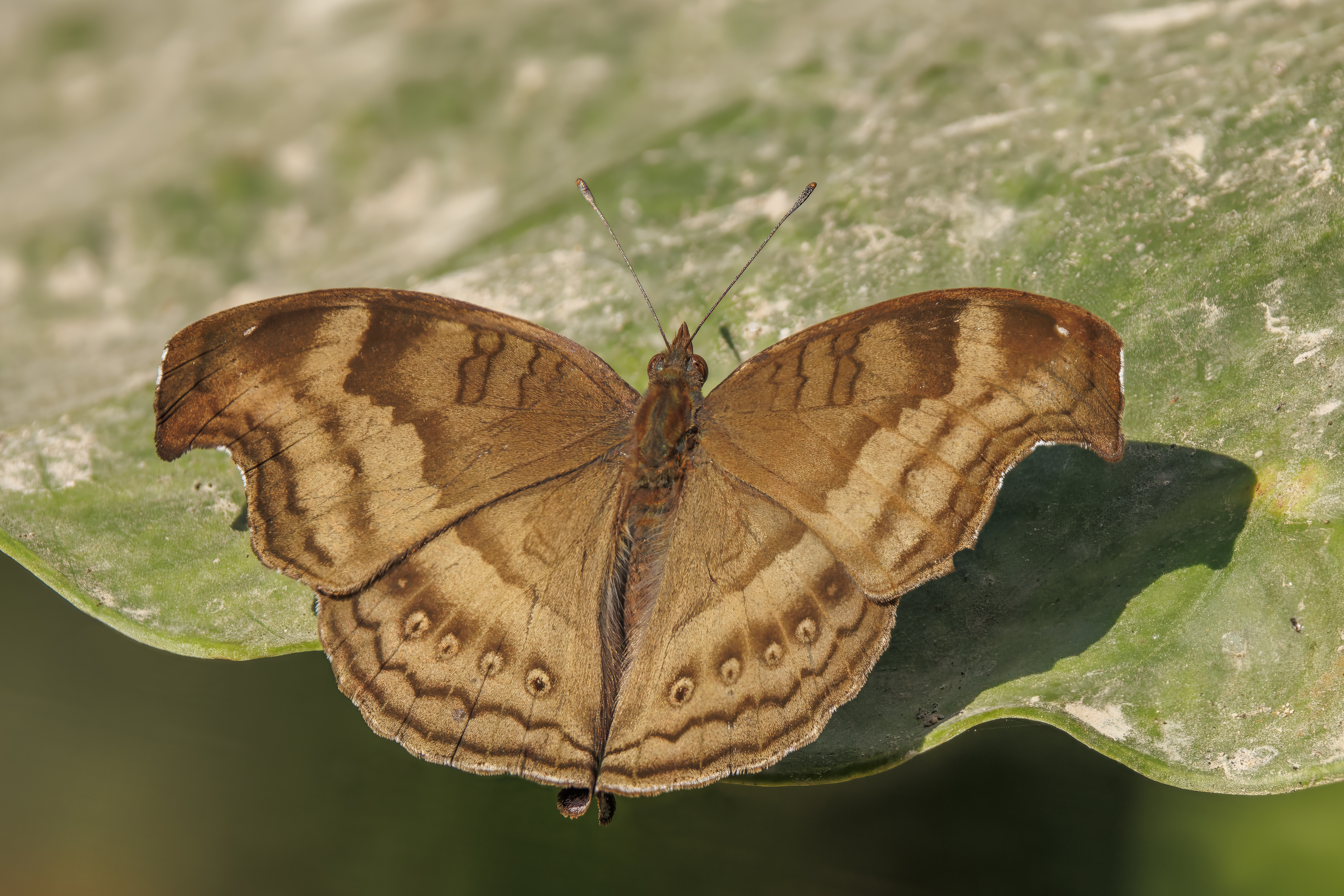

Scientific classification
- Kingdom: Animalia
- Phylum: Arthropoda
- Clade: Pancrustacea
- Class: Insecta
- Order: Lepidoptera
- Family: Nymphalidae
- Genus: Junonia
- Species: J. iphita

Binomial name
- Junonia iphita (Cramer, 1779)

Synonyms
- Precis iphita

= Junonia iphita =

Chocolate pansy

Species of butterfly

Junonia iphita, the chocolate pansy or chocolate soldier, is a butterfly found in Asia.

The wingspan is about 5–6 cm (2.0–2.4 in) and the female can be told apart from the male by white markings on the oblique line on the underside of the hindwing. The wavy lines on the underside of the wings vary from wet- to dry-season forms.

Individuals maintain a territory and are usually found close to the ground level and often bask in the sun.

== Description ==
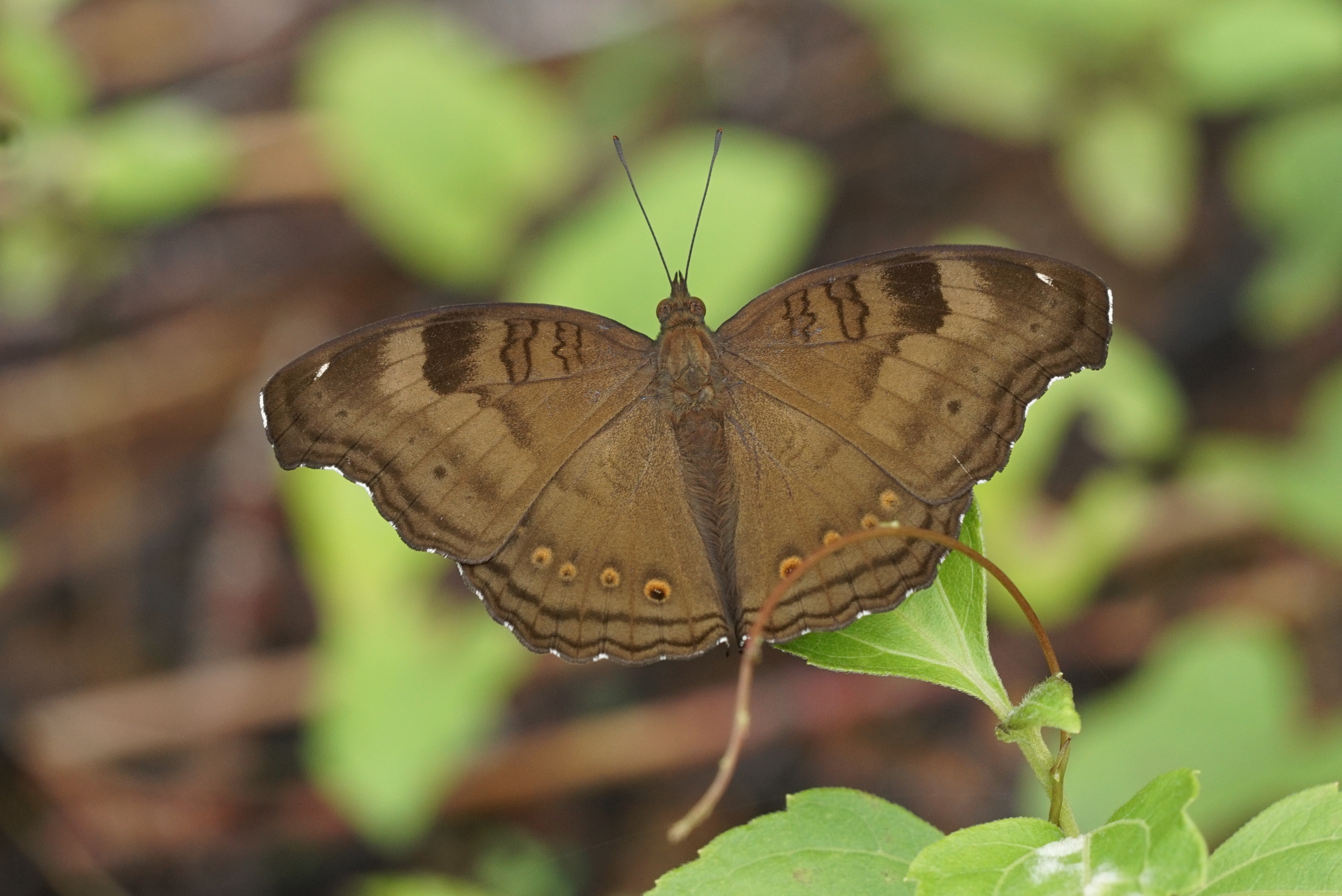

Upperside of both sexes brown, of varying depths of colour. Forewing: cell with one pair of subbasal and one pair of apical transverse sinuous fasciae, the outermost defining the discocellulars; a short, broad, dark, oblique fascia beyond to vein 4, its inner margin diffuse, its outer sinuous but sharply defined; below vein 4 a sinuous, transverse, fainter fascia, followed by a discal blackish fascia, very broad and diffuse below costa, bordered by a row of faint ocelli, and a postdiscal and a subterminal similar fascia following the outline of the termen. Hindwing with a slender blackish loop near apex of cellular area; a broad inwardly diffuse, outwardly well-defined short discal fascia in continuation of the one on the forewing; a series of postdiscal somewhat ochraceous ocelli with black pupils minutely centred with white; postdiscal and subterminal broad lines as on the forewing.

Underside brown, with very broad darker brown transverse fasciae; the interspaces between the markings irrorated (sprinkled) with purplish silvery scales. Forewing with two sinuous fasciae on the basal half, succeeded by a discal fascia, very broad at the costal margin and decreasing in width to the dorsum, bearing on its outer border a row of obscure ocelli. This is succeeded by a zigzag dark line, and sinuous subterminal and terminal lines; apex and tornal area suffused with purplish silvery. Hindwing: two irregular, very broad, dark brown, curved short fasciae near base; a straight, transverse, prominent, narrow ochreous-brown discal band defined outwardly by a black line; a transverse postdiscal dark brown fascia, widest in the middle and bearing outwardly a curved row of ochreous-brown white-centred ocelli, followed by a zigzag dark line in continuation of the one on the forewing; a subterminal somewhat diffuse dark fascia and a terminal dark line. Antennae, head, thorax, and abdomen dark brown.

== Life history ==
The eggs are often laid on the ground or on dry twigs near the host plants rather than on them. On hatching the larvae find their way to the host plants.

== Larva ==
"Cylindrical, slightly pubescent and armed with nine longitudinal rows of many-branched spines, except on the head which is clothed with short bristles. ... Colour dark dull brown." (Davidson and Aitken)

== Pupa ==
The pupa "is regular, with three or five dorsal rows of small tubercular points, hung perpendicularly. ... Colour smoky brown."(Davidson & Aitken)

== Larval food plants ==
The larvae feed on a variety of plants of the family Acanthaceae species recorded are -

- Hygrophila costata
- Justicia micrantha
- Justicia procumbens
- Justicia sphaerosperma
- Lepidagathis formosensis
- Strobilanthes callosus
- Strobilanthes formosanus.
- Barleria cristata
- Dipteracanthus prostratus
- Hygrophila auriculata
- Ruellia elegans
- Ruellia simplex
- Ruellia tuberosa
- Strobilanthes
- Achimenes grandiflora
- Strobilanthes ciliata
- Eranthemum roseum

In Taiwan, the chocolate pansy was seen shifting host plants from its original host Strobilanthes penstemonoides var. formosana to the aquatic plant Hygrophila pogonocalyx. H. pogonocalyx was an endangered species and was restored on a mass scale, which likely inducing the observed shift of host plants by the chocolate pansy.

== Gallery ==
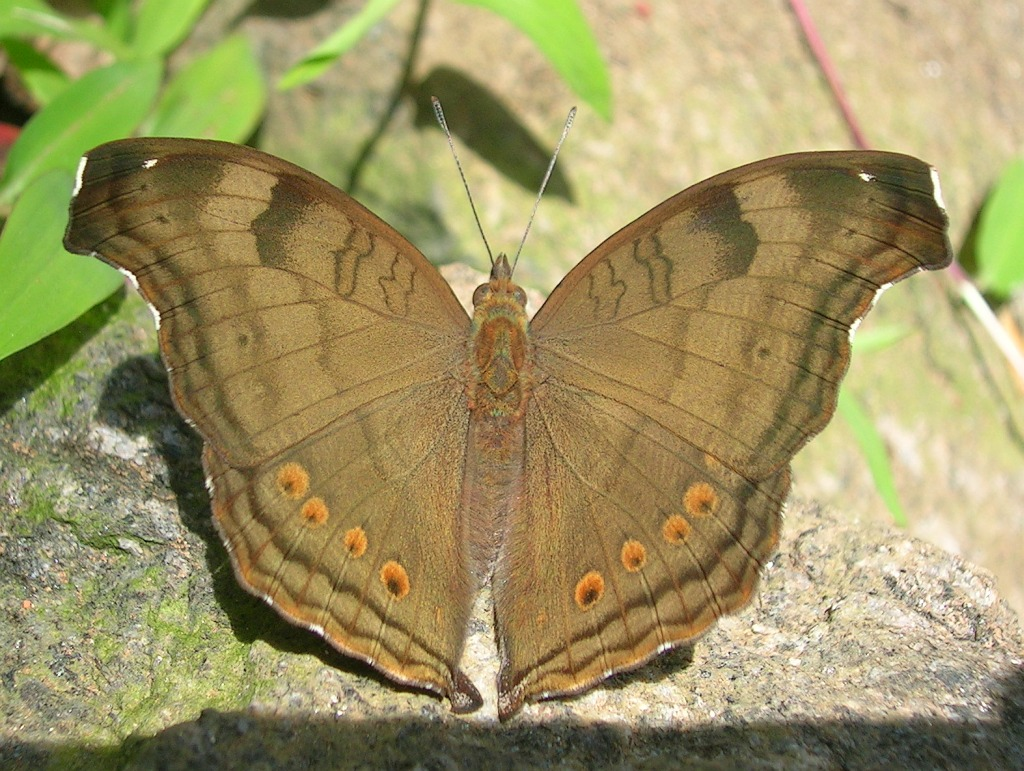
Upperside

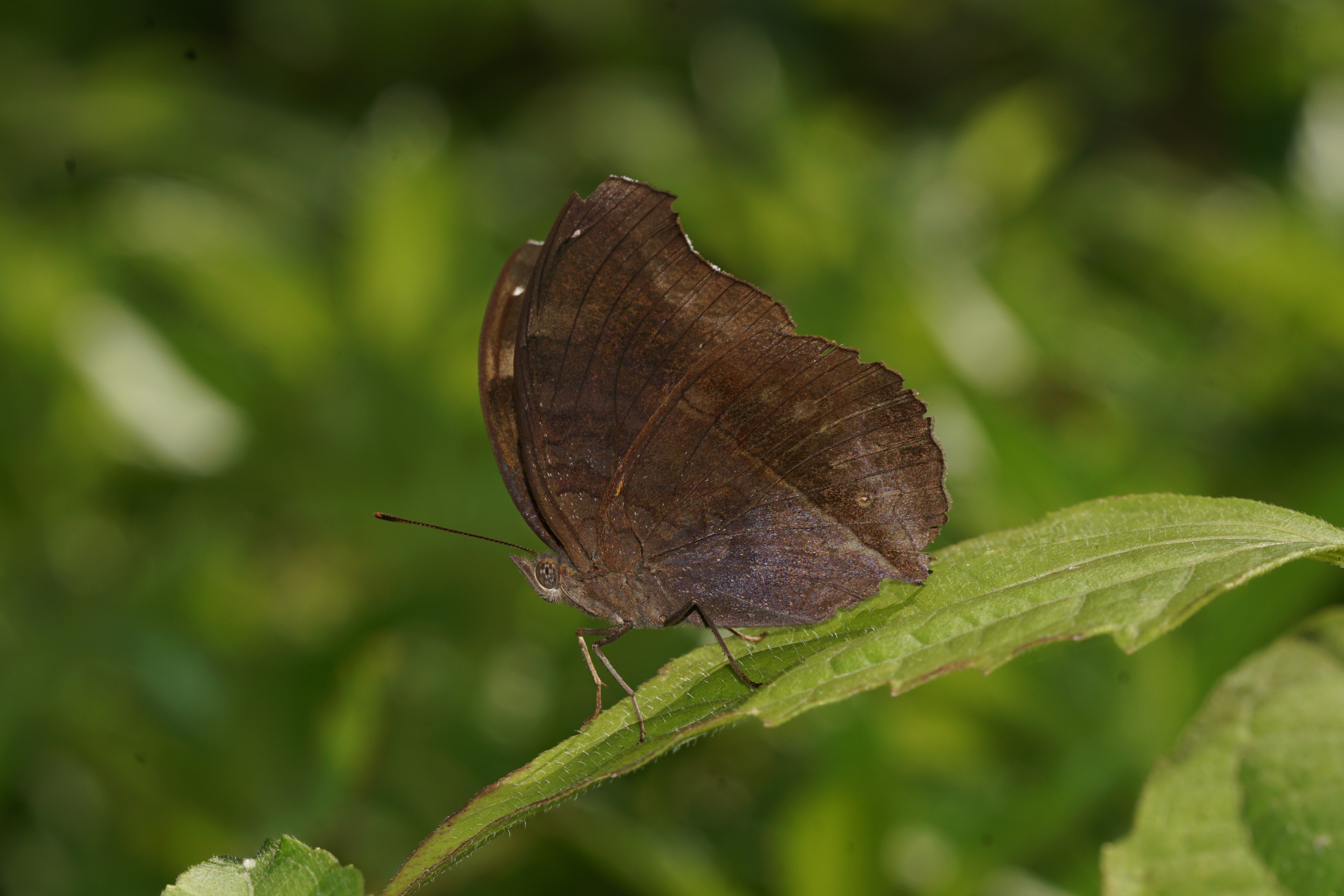
Underside

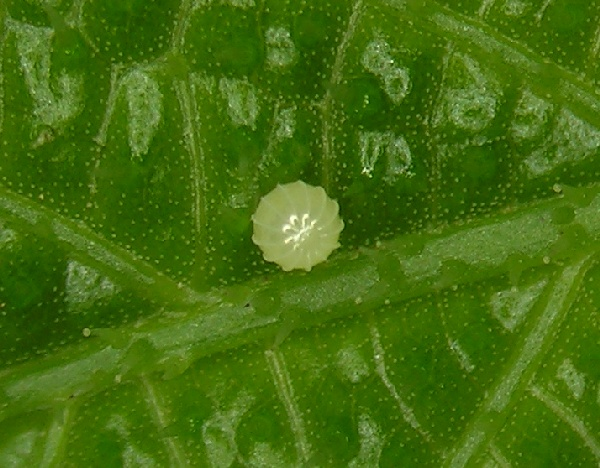
Egg

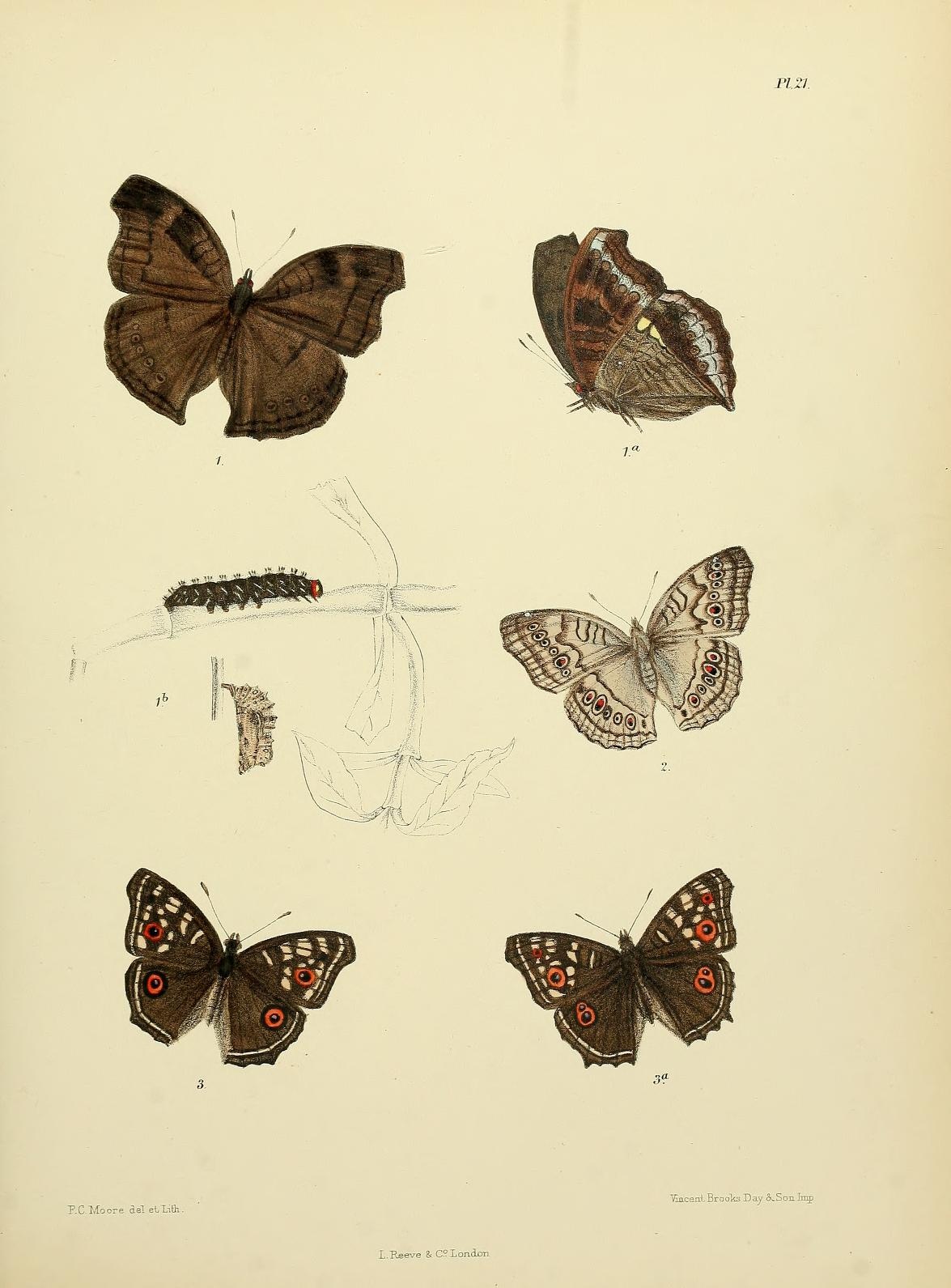
Plate from Frederic Moore's The Lepidoptera of Ceylon depicting imagines, larva and pupa

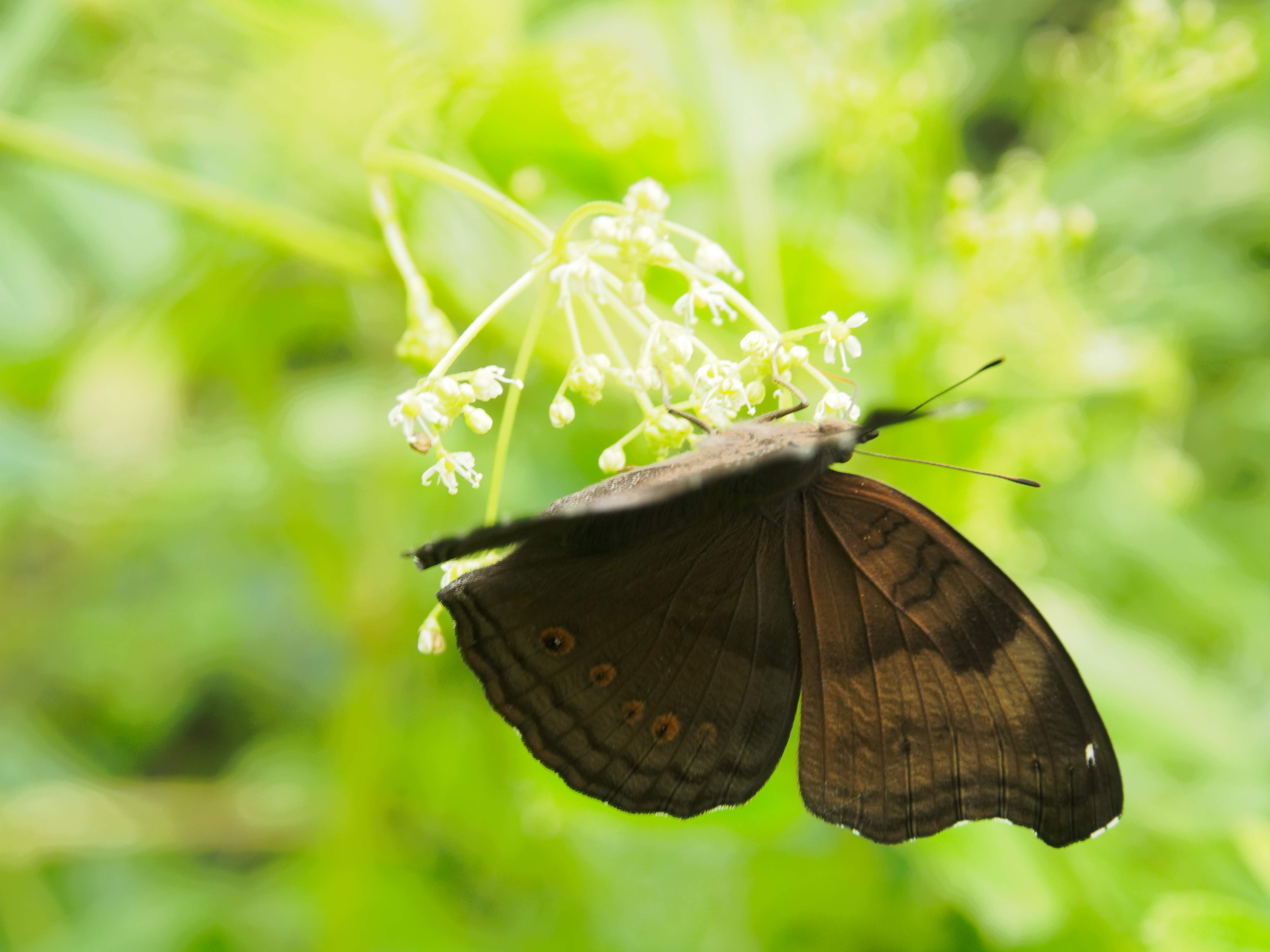
Chocolate Pansy, Maharashtra

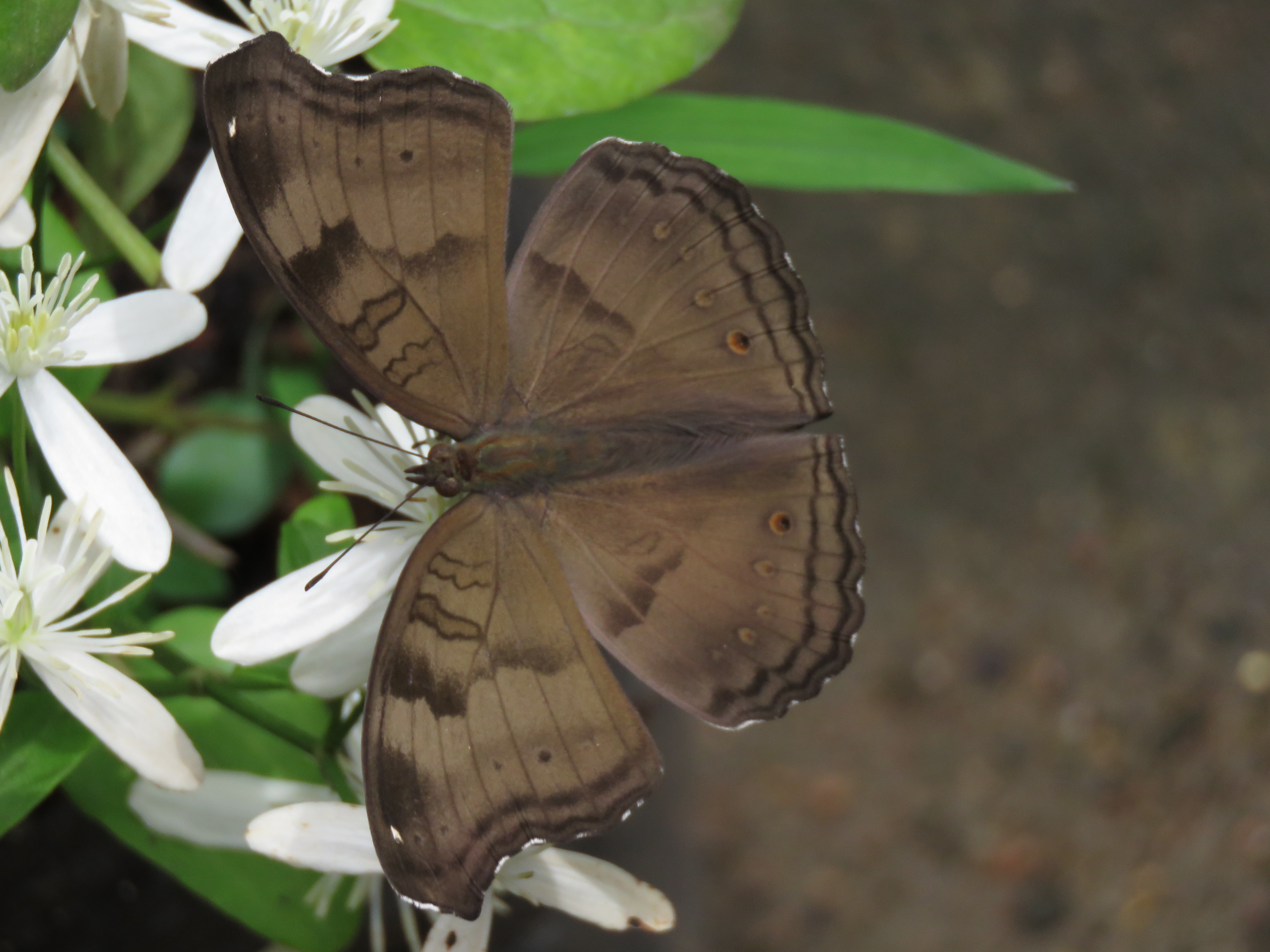
Chocolate Pansy, Location: Trivandrum, Kerala, India

== See also ==
- List of butterflies of India (Nymphalidae)
