= Hygrophila =

Hygrophila may refer to:

- Hygrophila (gastropod), a superorder of freshwater snails
- Hygrophila (plant), a plant genus
- Hygrophila, a plant subsection
