= H. portoricensis =

H. portoricensis may refer to:

- Harrisia portoricensis, a cactus endemic to Puerto Rico
- Hohenbergia portoricensis, a bromeliad endemic to Puerto Rico
- Hygrophila portoricensis, a swampweed native to Brazil
