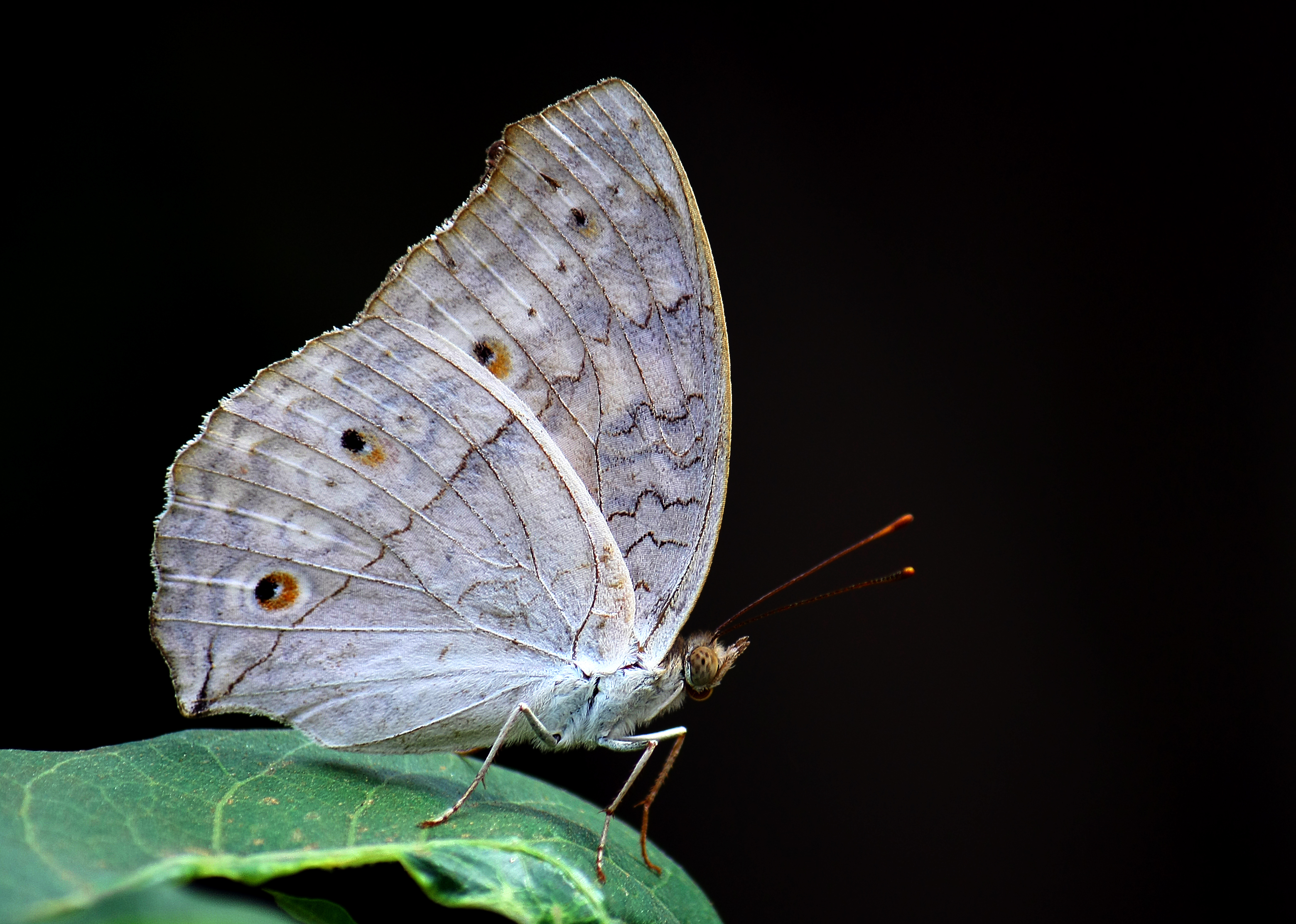
- Ventral side in Sri Lanka

Scientific classification
- Kingdom: Animalia
- Phylum: Arthropoda
- Clade: Pancrustacea
- Class: Insecta
- Order: Lepidoptera
- Family: Nymphalidae
- Genus: Junonia
- Species: J. atlites

Binomial name
- Junonia atlites (Linnaeus, 1763)

Synonyms
- Papilio atlites Linnaeus, 1763; Papilio laomedia Linnaeus, 1767; Precis atlites acera Fruhstorfer, 1912

= Junonia atlites =

Grey pansy
- In West Bengal, India

Species of butterfly

Junonia atlites, the grey pansy, is a species of nymphalid butterfly found in South Asia.

== Distribution ==
J. atlites is found in Bangladesh, India, southern China, Cambodia, Indochina, the Malay Peninsula, western and central Indonesia, and the Philippines.

== Description ==
Upperside of both sexes pale lavender brown, apical half of wings paler. Forewing: cell with, three transverse, short, sinuous black bands, the outermost defining the discocellulars; a similar short, somewhat broader band beyond the apex of the cell; two transverse discal dusky black fasciae, the inner highly sinuous and outward, angulate above vein 4, the outer straighter, somewhat lunular, bordered by a series of whitish ovals with dusky or black centers. The black-centered spots in the ovals in interspaces 2, 5, and 6 margined posteriorly with rich ocherous yellow. Beyond this series of ovals is a lunular, narrow, transverse dark band, followed by sinuous subterminal and terminal broad dark lines. Apex of wing slightly fuliginous. Hindwing: a short slender black loop from veins 6 to 4 at apex of cell-area; two discal sinuous transverse dark, fasciae in continuation of those on the forewing: followed by a series of dark-centered ovals in interspaces 2–6, the ovals in interspaces 2, 5, and 6 with the dark centers inwardly broadly bordered with ochreous yellow; postdiscal, subterminal and terminal dark lunular lines as on the forewing.

Underside lilacine white markings as on the upperside but very delicate, slender and somewhat obsolescent. In the dry-season forms of the males the rows of oval ocelli are only indicated by the yellow-centered ovals. The most prominent marking is the inner discal fascia crossing the wings; this is much less sinuous than on the upperside and not angulated on the forewing. In the females the markings are all heavier and more distinct, the space between the various transverse fasciae tinged with ocherous.

== Ecology ==
The larvae of J. atlites feed on Oryza, Pseuderanthemum, Strobilanthes, Asteracantha longifolia, Alternanthera philoxeroides, Barleria, Hygrophila lancea, and Hygrophila salicifolia.

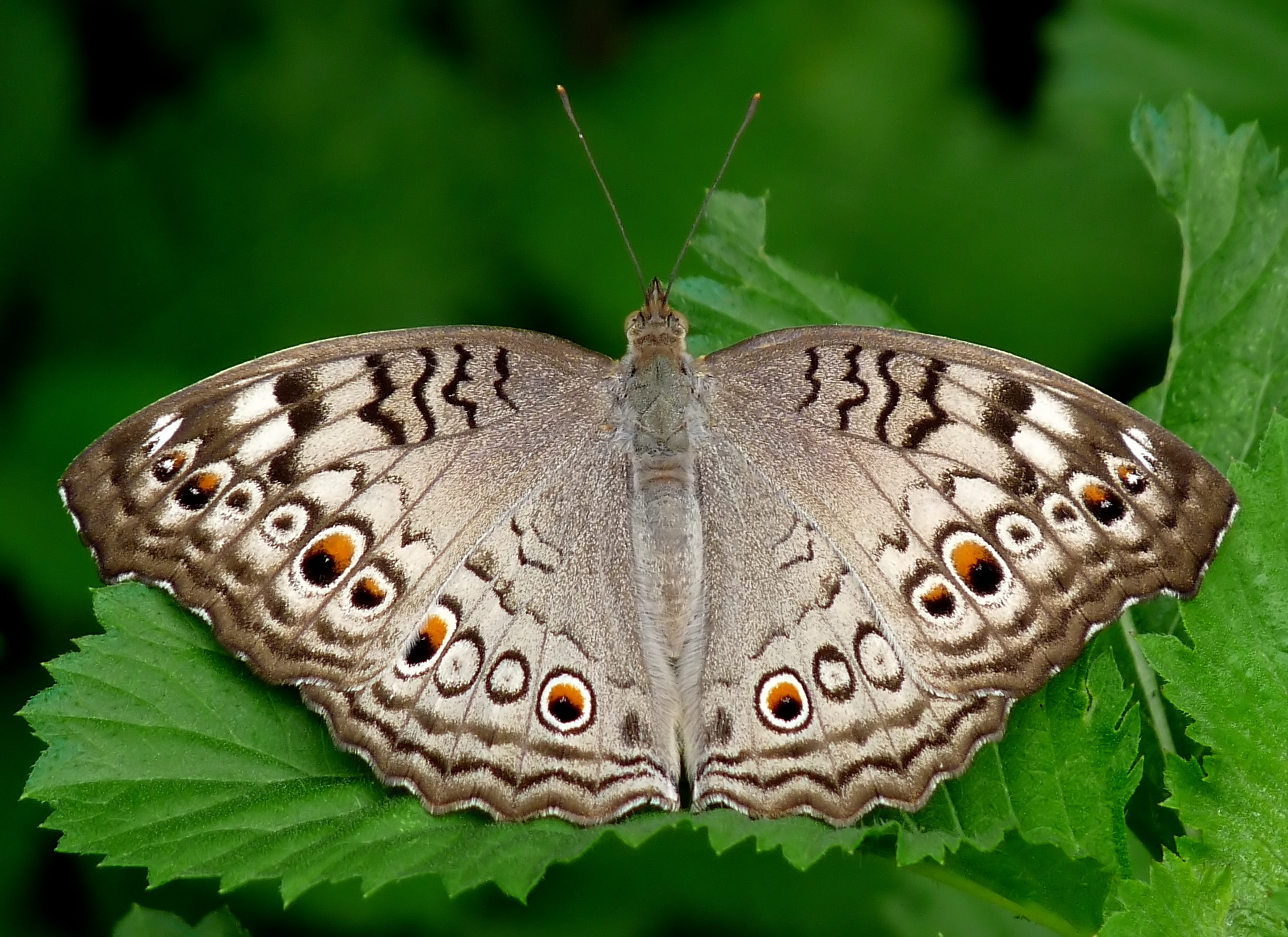
Upperside

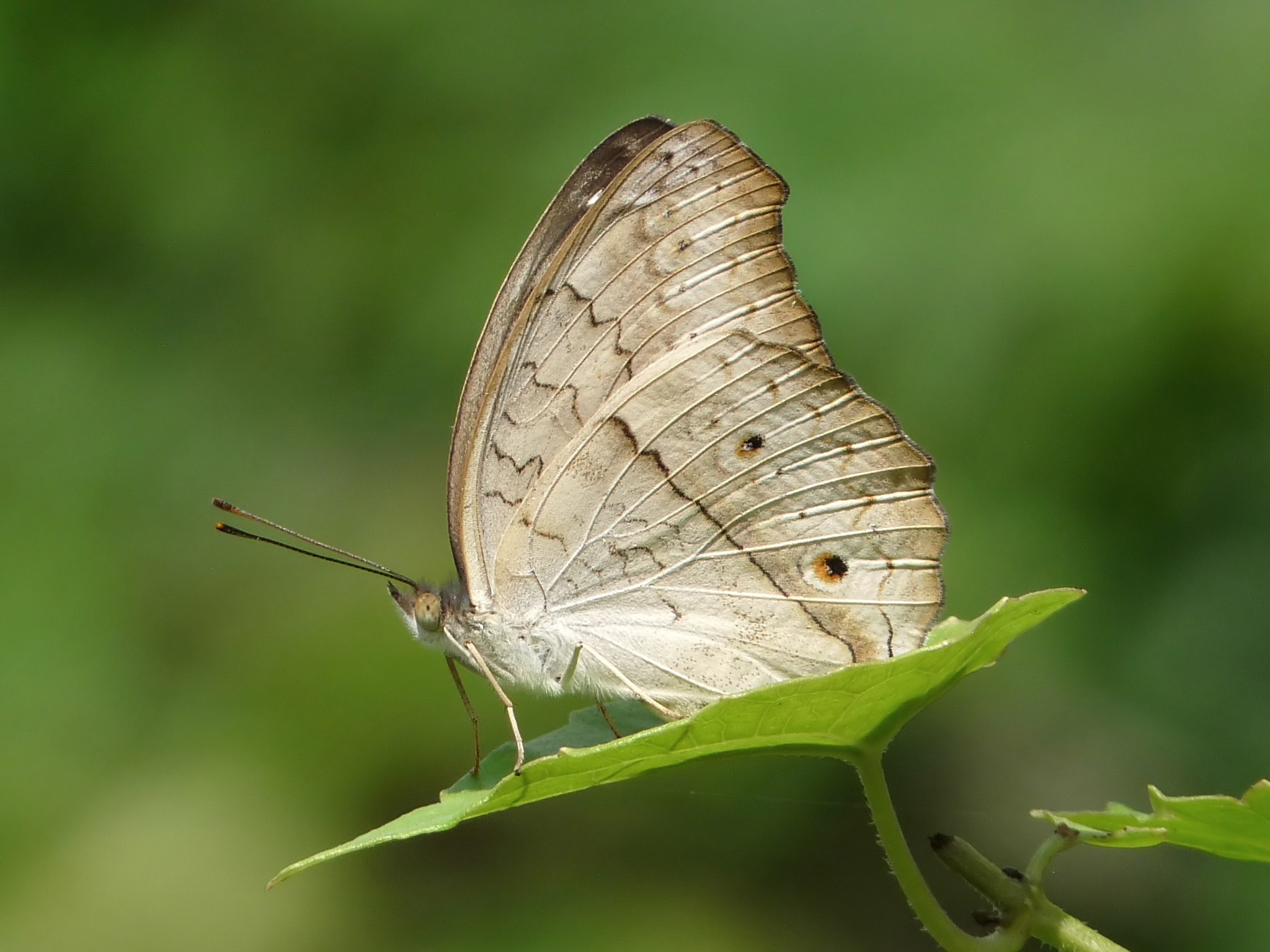
Underside

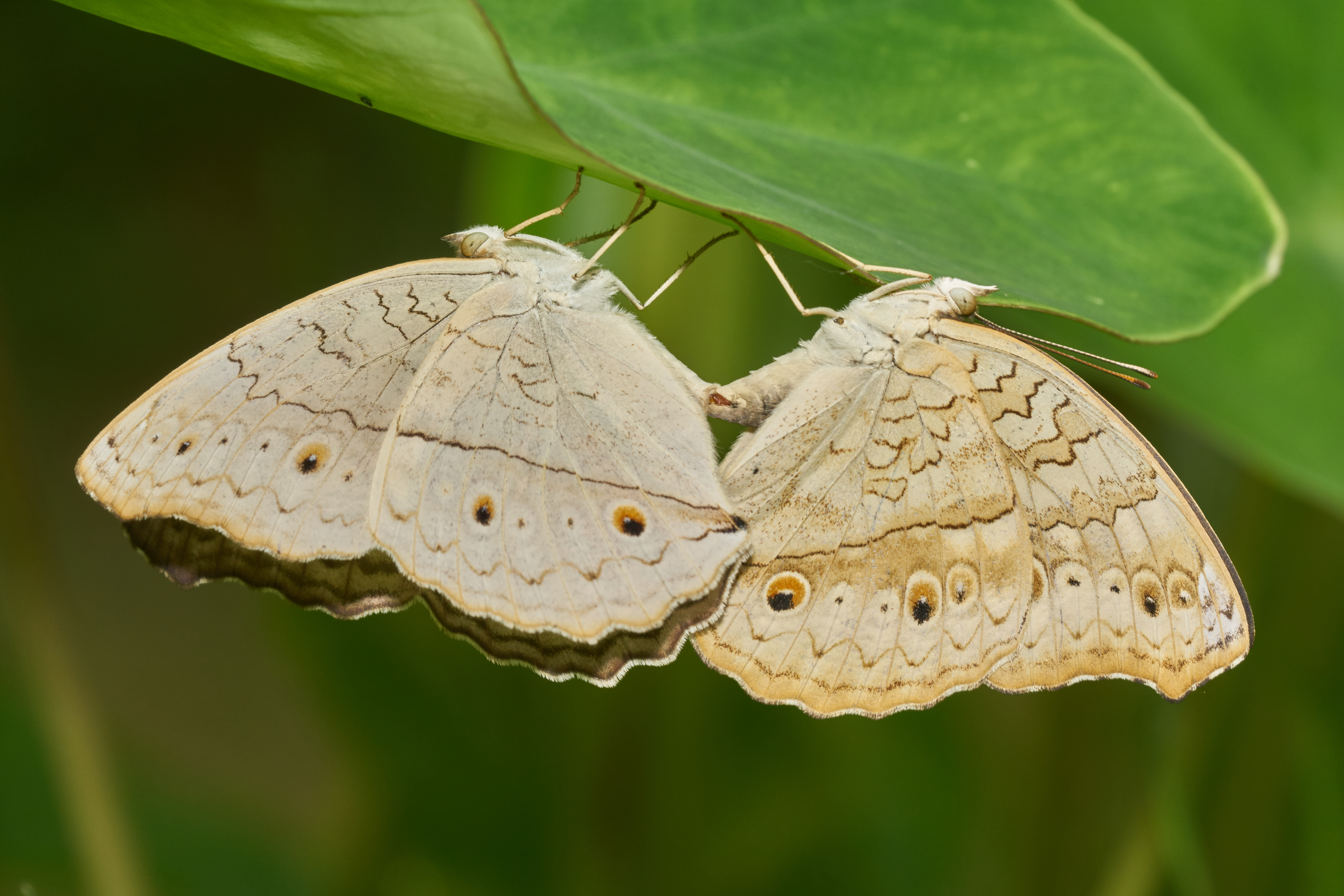
Mating

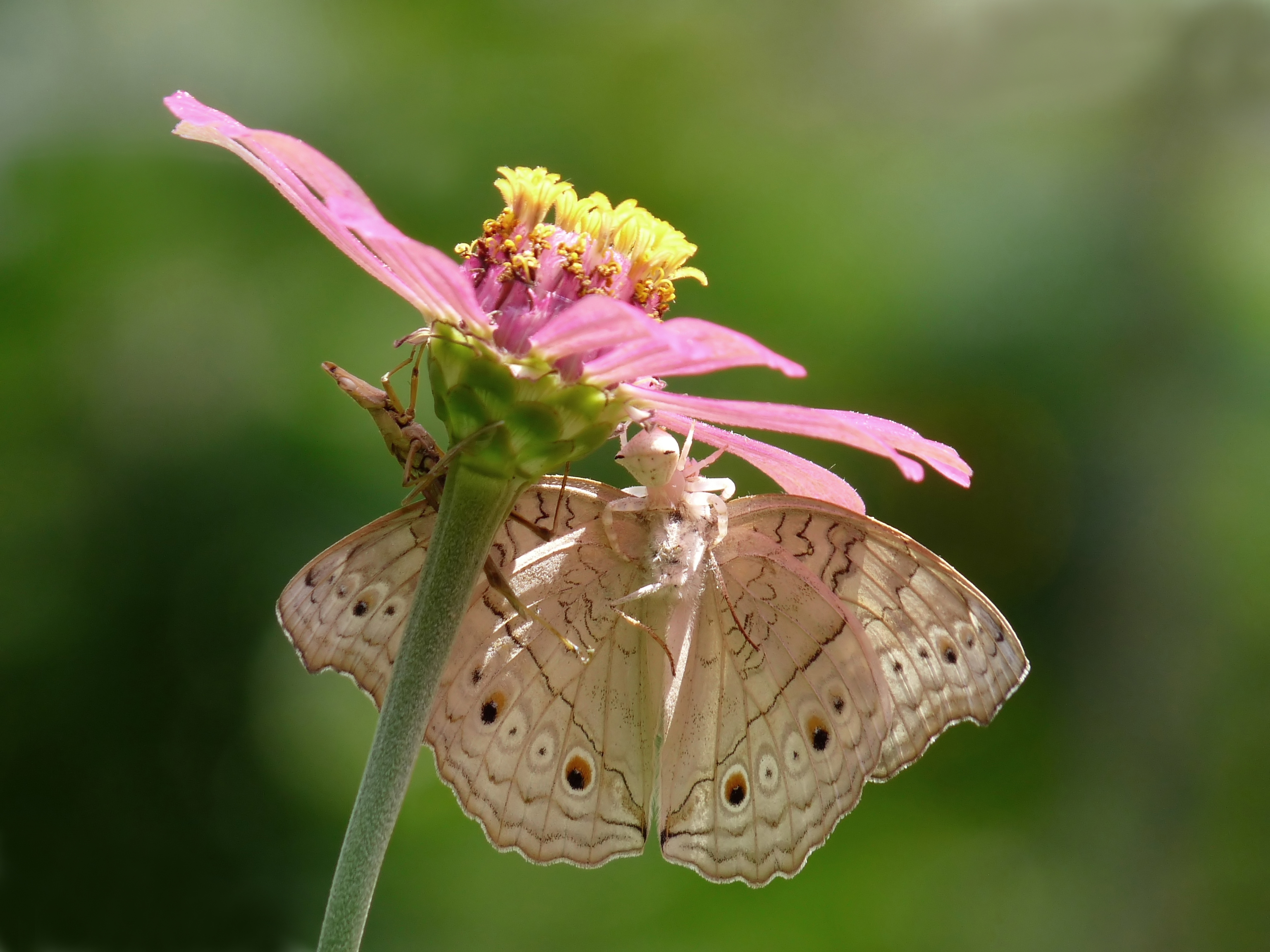
As prey

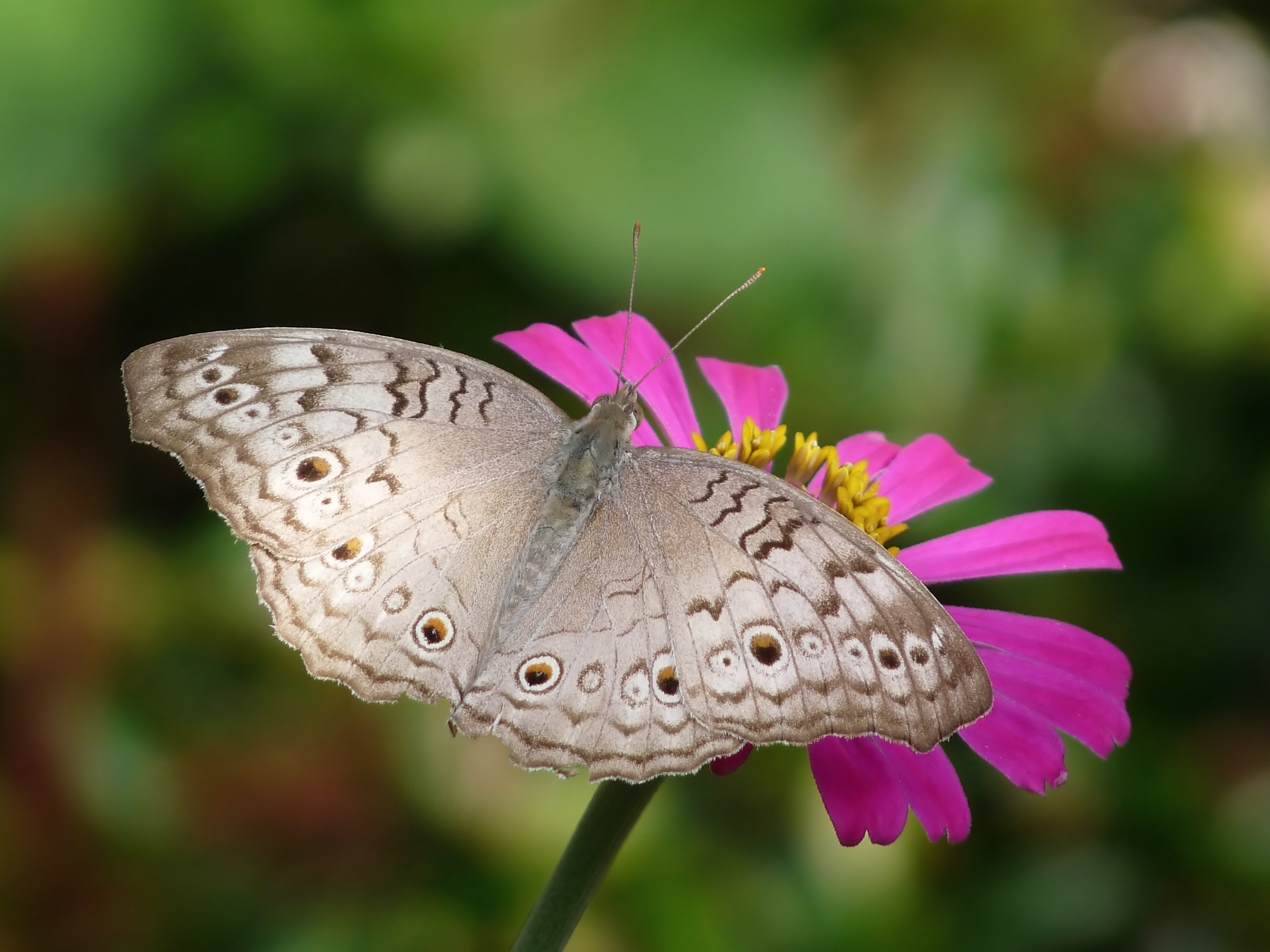
On flower

Video clip
