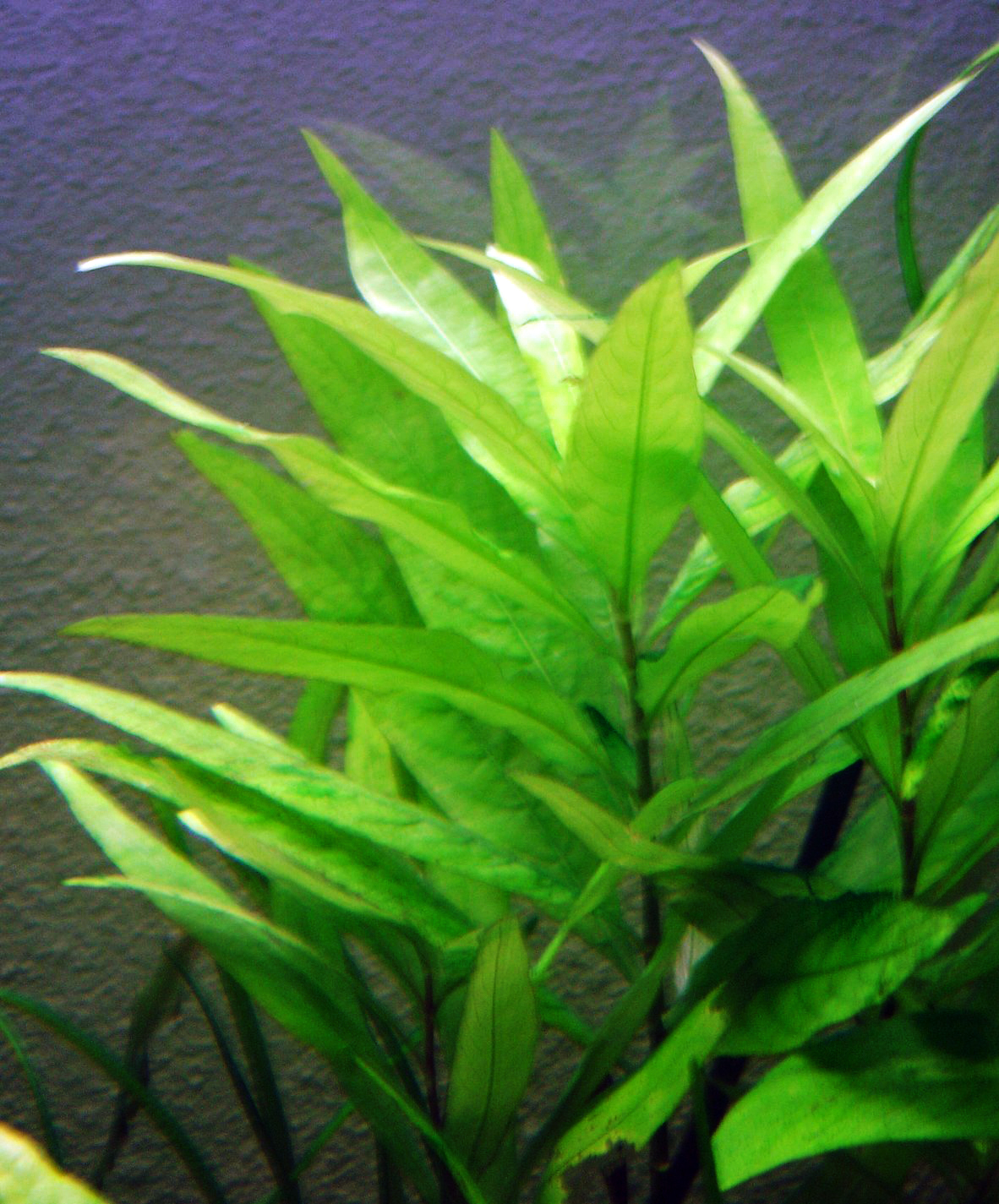
- Hygrophila corymbosa in an aquarium

Scientific classification
- Kingdom: Plantae
- Clade: Tracheophytes
- Clade: Angiosperms
- Clade: Eudicots
- Clade: Asterids
- Order: Lamiales
- Family: Acanthaceae
- Genus: Hygrophila
- Species: H. corymbosa

Binomial name
- Hygrophila corymbosa Lindau

Synonyms
- Nomaphila stricta

= Hygrophila corymbosa =

Species of aquatic plant

Hygrophila corymbosa, commonly known as temple plant, starhorn or giant hygro, is a riparian plant in the acanthus family.

Synonyms - Nomaphila corymbosa Nomaphila stricta var. corymbosa

== Habitat ==
It is indigenous to selected countries of Southeast Asia like Malaysia, Thailand, Singapore, Indonesia, and India. It also grows in the USA and Mexico, but is grown worldwide in tropical aquariums. The plant naturally grows as an emergent, but it can survive long periods fully submerged.

== Cultivation ==
Hygrophila corymbosa is a fast-growing plant that can be frequently trimmed back. It prefers a well-lit situation, a nutrient-rich water and compost, and benefits from additional CO_{2}. If it is allowed to grow out of the aquarium, it will bear purple scented flowers, often causing the lower leaves to drop. The plant is adaptable to a variety of water conditions.

There are several forms in the aquarium trade such as red, siamensis compacta and many others, that seem to be mainly ecological variants, colour variation depends upon illumination, and the amount of iron available.

It can be easily propagated by taking cuttings and planting them in the substrate. The plant is reported to be useful for absorbing ammonium and nitrates and helping to fight algal growth.
