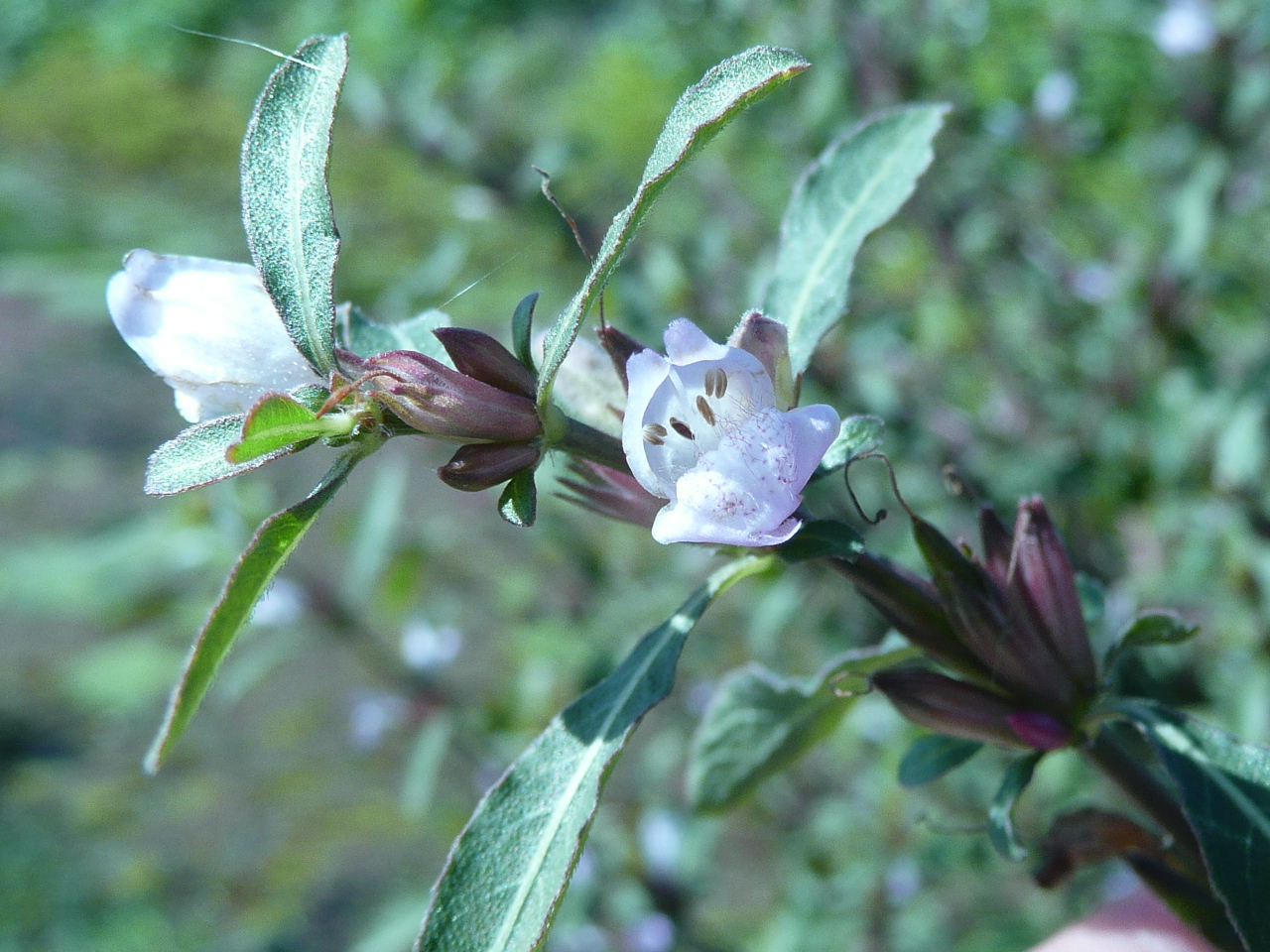
- Flowers
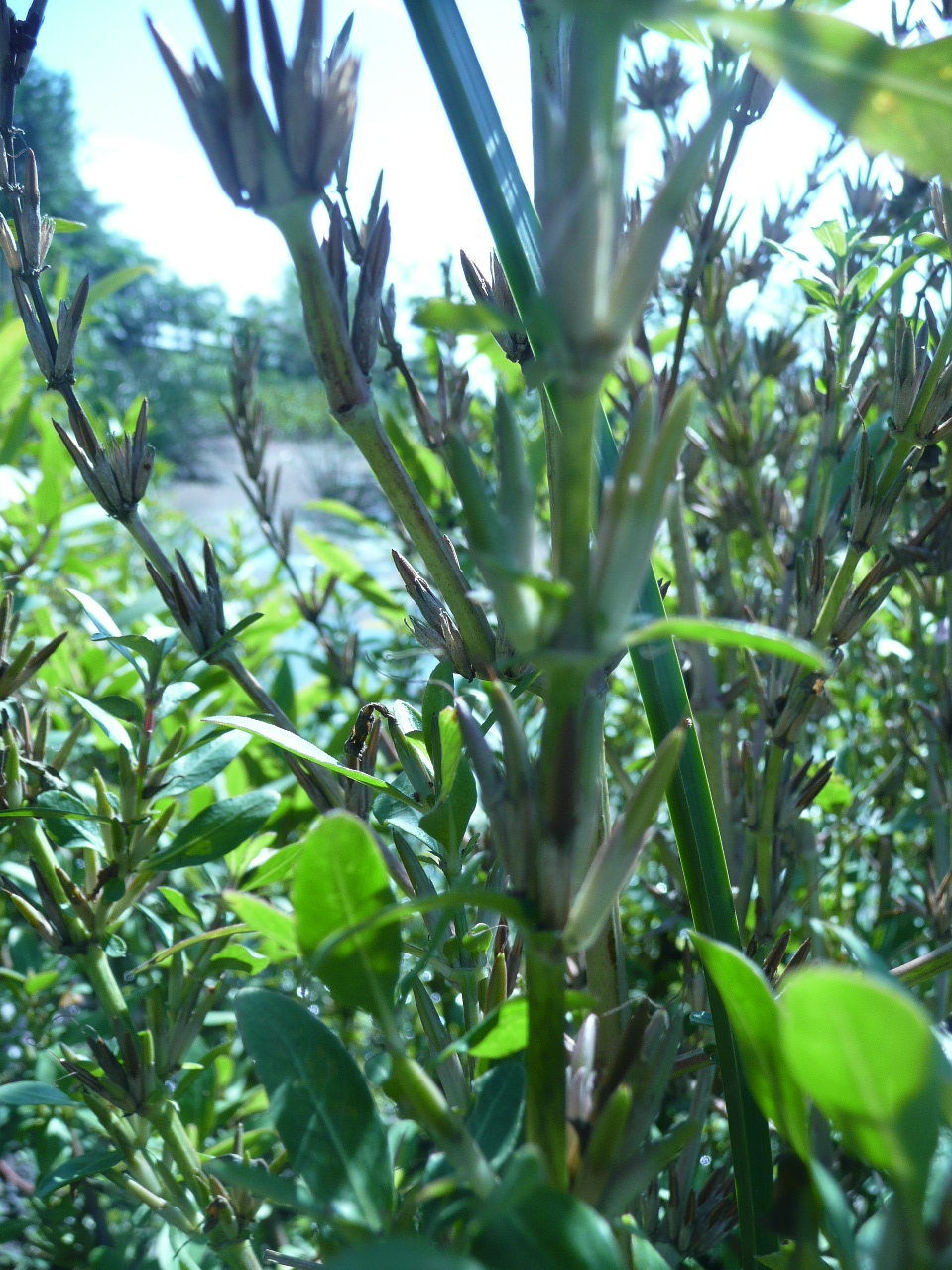
- Stems

Scientific classification
- Kingdom: Plantae
- Clade: Tracheophytes
- Clade: Angiosperms
- Clade: Eudicots
- Clade: Asterids
- Order: Lamiales
- Family: Acanthaceae
- Genus: Hygrophila
- Species: H. pogonocalyx

Binomial name
- Hygrophila pogonocalyx Hayata
- Range in Taiwan

= Hygrophila pogonocalyx =

Species of plant

Hygrophila pogonocalyx is a species of flowering plant in the family Acanthaceae, native to Taiwan. An erect annual reaching 50 cm (20 in), it is found in wet places.
