= Hygrophila gracillima =

Conservation status
- Least Concern (IUCN 3.1)

Scientific classification
- Kingdom: Plantae
- Clade: Tracheophytes
- Clade: Angiosperms
- Clade: Eudicots
- Clade: Asterids
- Order: Lamiales
- Family: Acanthaceae
- Genus: Hygrophila
- Species: H. gracillima

Binomial name
- Hygrophila gracillima (Schinz) Burkill

Species of flowering plant

Hygrophila gracillima is a species of plant in the family Acanthaceae. It is found in Namibia and possibly Angola. Its natural habitats are intermittent rivers and intermittent freshwater marshes. It is threatened by habitat loss.
