= Fishbowl =

A fish bowl is a container for fish.

Fishbowl may also refer to:

== Arts and media ==
=== Music ===
- "Fishbowl", a song on the album Mythologies, by Rhett Miller
- "Fishbowl", a song on the album Very Proud of Ya, by AFI
- "Fishbowl", a song on the album In the Meantime, by Alessia Cara
- "Fish Bowl", a song on the album Bonito Generation, by Kero Kero Bonito

=== Television ===
- "My Fishbowl", an episode of the television show Scrubs
- Amazon Fishbowl, a talk show on Amazon.com hosted by comedian Bill Maher

== Places ==
- Shaw Park, in Winnipeg, Manitoba, Canada
- Del Rio, Florida, a community in the United States
- The "Pesciara" of Monte Bolca, a site famous for fish fossils near Verona, Italy

== Technology ==
- Fishbowl (secure phone), developed by the US National Security Agency
- Operation Fishbowl, a US nuclear weapon test series
- The "fishbowl helmet" of the Apollo/Skylab A7L spacesuit

== Vehicles ==
- AMC Pacer, automobile with large curved glass surfaces, nicknamed "Flying Fishbowl"
- British Rail Class 332 and Class 333 trains
- GM New Look bus, a model of transit bus

== Other uses ==
- Fishbowl (conversation), a debate format
- An alternative name for Celebrity (game)
- Fishbowl (restaurant), an Australian fast-food chain, now known as Thisbowl
