= Hygrophila madurensis =

Conservation status
- Critically Endangered (IUCN 3.1)

Scientific classification
- Kingdom: Plantae
- Clade: Tracheophytes
- Clade: Angiosperms
- Clade: Eudicots
- Clade: Asterids
- Order: Lamiales
- Family: Acanthaceae
- Genus: Hygrophila
- Species: H. madurensis

Binomial name
- Hygrophila madurensis (N.P.Balakr. & Subram.) Karthik. & Moorthy

Synonyms
- Santapaua madurensis N.P.Balakr. & Subram.

Species of aquatic plant

Hygrophila madurensis is a critically endangered aquatic plant in the family Acanthaceae. It is endemic to Nallakulam in the Alagar Hills of the Eastern Ghats in Madurai district, Tamil Nadu, India.

Balakrishnan and Subramaniam (in J. Indian Bot. Soc. vol.42 on page 411 in 1964), described the genus Santapaua with only one species, namely S. madurensis. Karthikeyan and Moorthy (Fl. Pl. India: vol.22 in 2009) merged the genus Santapaua with Hygrophila giving this species the name, Hygrophila madurensis.
