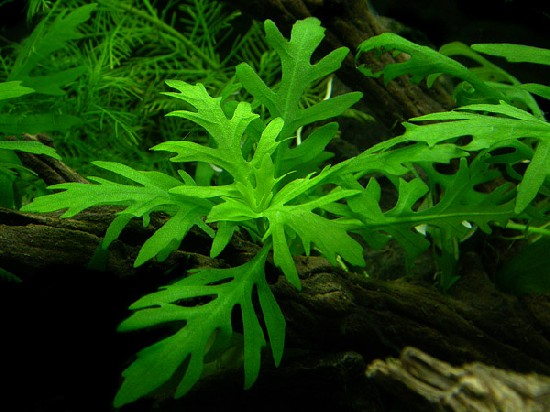

Conservation status
- Least Concern (IUCN 3.1)

Scientific classification
- Kingdom: Plantae
- Clade: Tracheophytes
- Clade: Angiosperms
- Clade: Eudicots
- Clade: Asterids
- Order: Lamiales
- Family: Acanthaceae
- Genus: Hygrophila
- Species: H. difformis

Binomial name
- Hygrophila difformis Blume

Synonyms
- Ruellia difformis; Synnema triflorum

= Hygrophila difformis =

Species of aquatic plant

Hygrophila difformis, commonly known as water wisteria (though it is not closely related to true wisteria), is an aquatic plant in the acanthus family. It is found in marshy habitats on the Indian subcontinent in Bangladesh, Bhutan, India and Nepal. It grows to a height of 20 to 50 cm with a width of 15 to 25 cm.

== Cultivation ==
Water wisteria is easy to grow and as such it is a very popular plant for the tropical aquarium. It grows best in good light with a nutrient rich water and substrate and it benefits from additional CO_{2}. It can be easily propagated from cuttings.

== Heterophylly ==
Hygrophila difformis shows heterophyly which is the occurrence of different leaf morphology in the same plant.

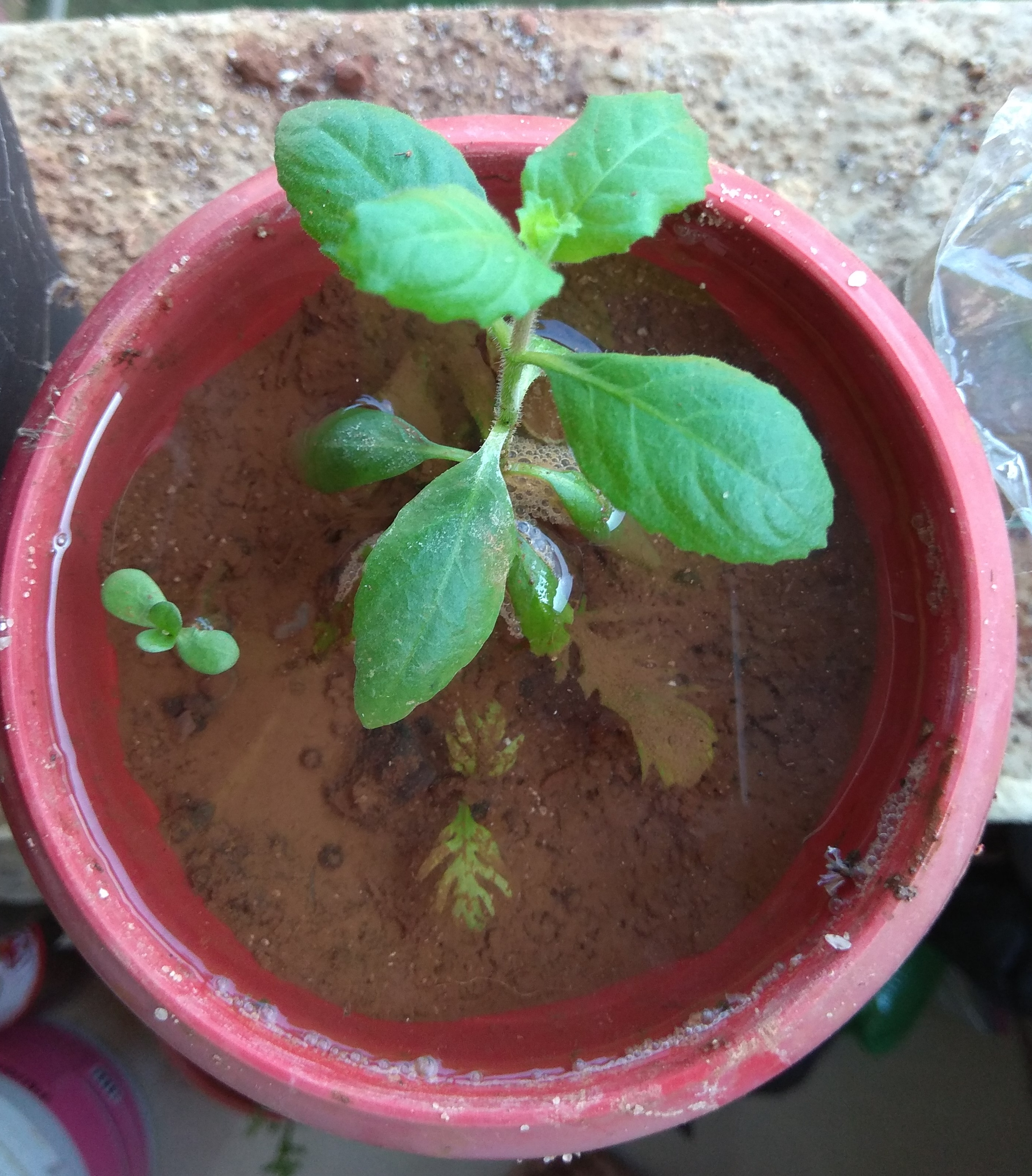
Water wisteria or Hygrophila difformis shows heterophylly, which is the occurrence of different leaf morphology in the same plant. This is emersed growth.

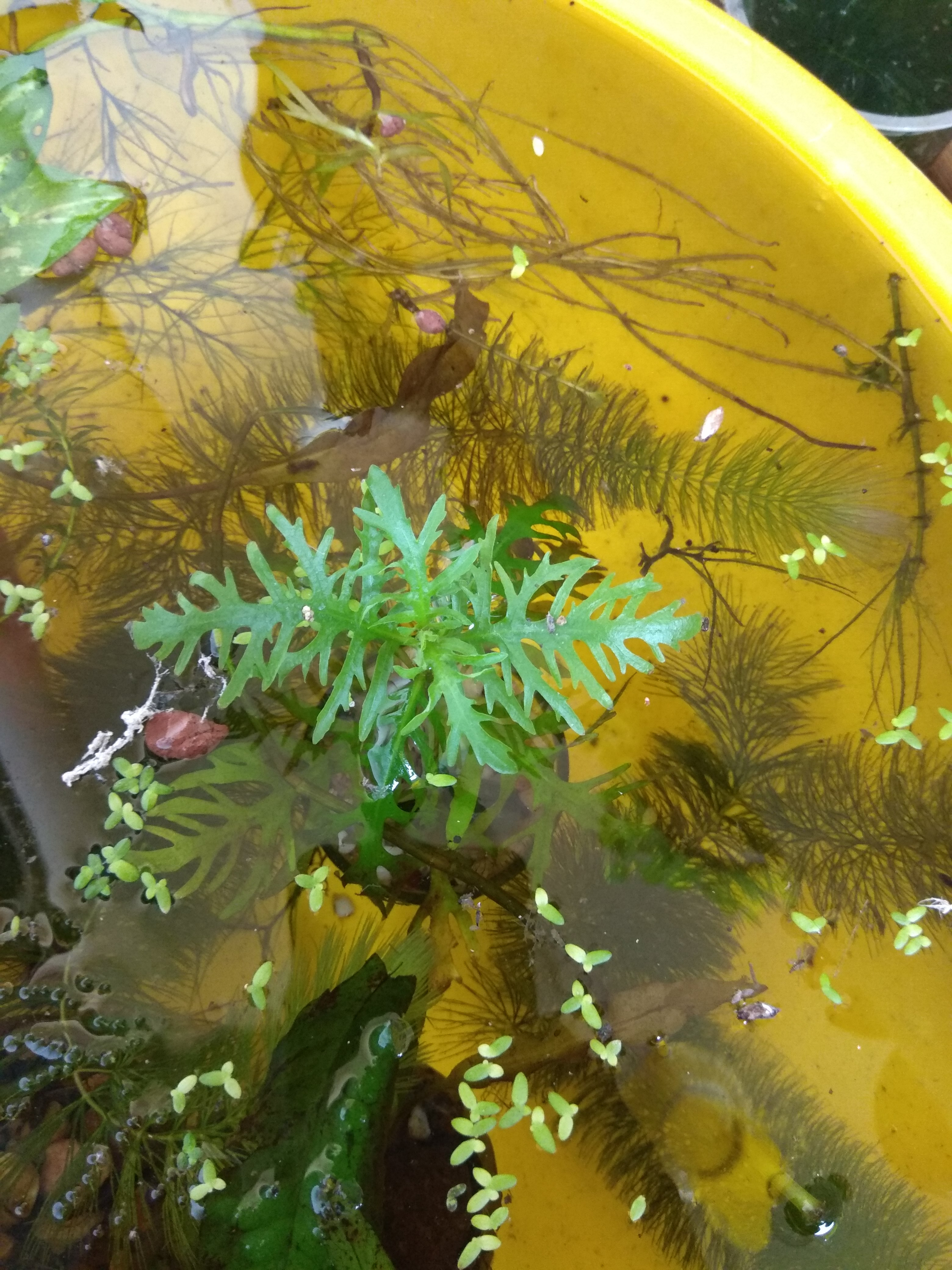
Water wisteria or Hygrophila difformis shows heterophylly, which is the occurrence of different leaf morphology in the same plant. This is submerged growth.
