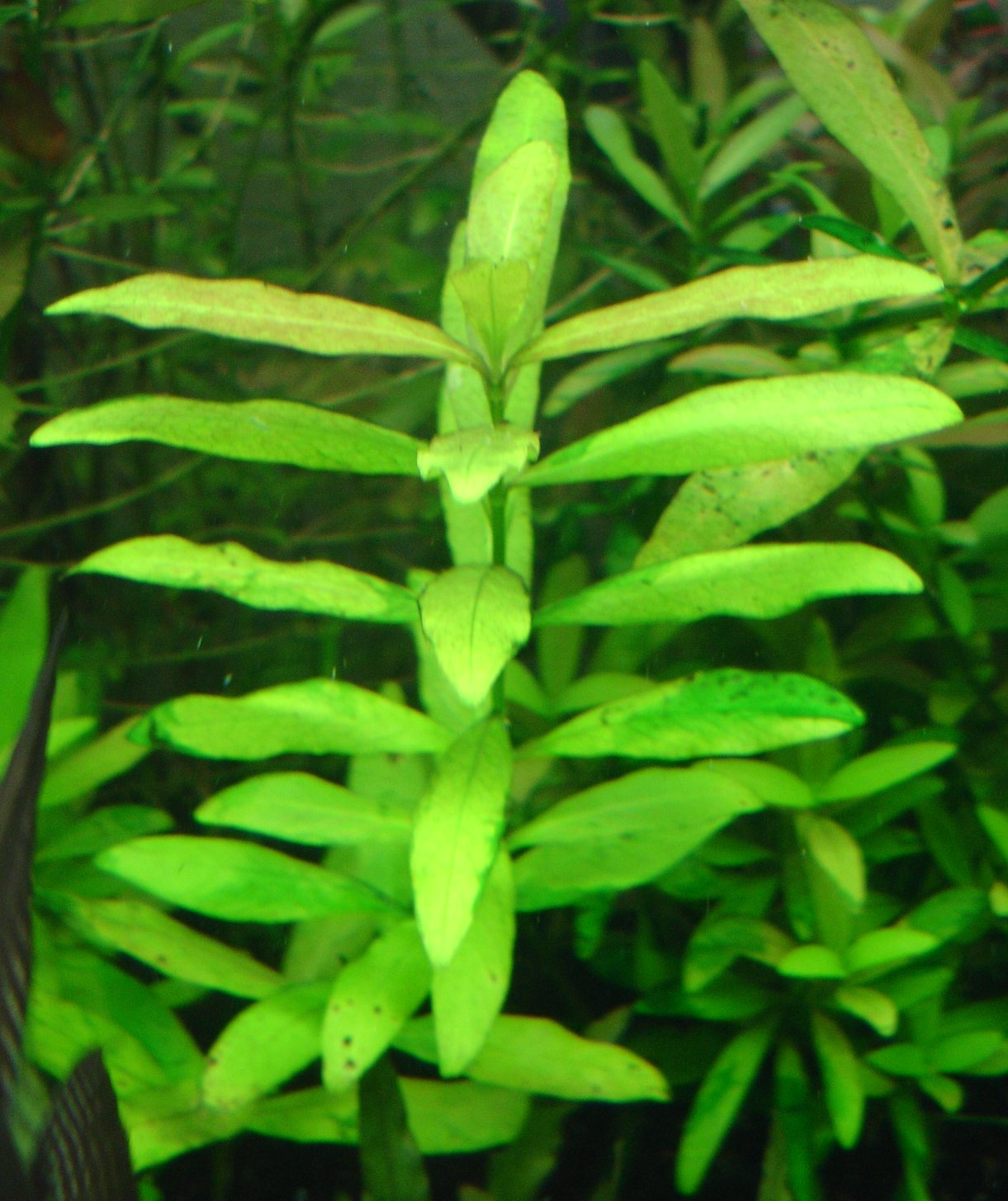
- Hygrophila polysperma in an aquarium

Scientific classification
- Kingdom: Plantae
- Clade: Tracheophytes
- Clade: Angiosperms
- Clade: Eudicots
- Clade: Asterids
- Order: Lamiales
- Family: Acanthaceae
- Subfamily: Acanthoideae
- Tribe: Ruellieae
- Genus: Hygrophila; R.Br. (1810)

Species
- 77; see text

Synonyms
- Adenosma Nees (1832), nom. illeg.; Asteracantha Nees (1832); Cardanthera Buch.-Ham. ex Benth. (1847); Eberlea Riddell ex Nees (1847); Hemiadelphis Nees (1832); Kita A.Chev. (1950); Nomaphila Blume (1826); Oryzetes Salisb. (1818); Physichilus Nees (1837); Plaesianthera Livera (1924); Polyechma Hochst. (1841); Santapaua N.P.Balakr. & Subr. (1964); Synnema Benth. (1846); Tenoria Dehnh. & Giord. (1832), nom. illeg.

= Hygrophila (plant) =

Genus of flowering plants

Hygrophila, commonly known as swampweeds, is a genus of flowering plants in the acanthus family, Acanthaceae. There are about 80 to 100 species, of which many are aquatic plants. The genus is distributed across the tropical and subtropical world. It is one of only two genera in its family that contains aquatic plants, the other being Justicia. The genus is treated in the tribe Hygrophileae, which is noted as being in need of revision at the genus level, meaning the current taxonomic boundaries of Hygrophila are likely to change in the future.

== Description ==
The leaves are either homomorphic, all with one form, or heteromorphic, with different forms on one plant. Homomorphic leaves are always simple and entire. Plants with heteromorphic leaves generally have pinnately divided basal leaves with either filiform (feather-like) or linear segments, and undivided leaves higher on the stem.

The flowers have white to purple corollas with either 5 equal lobes or 2 lips. A lipped corolla has an erect, concave upper lip with two lobes, and a lower lip with 3 lobes. The flower has four stamens. Two may be staminodal, lacking pollen. The individual filaments of the stamens are united into pairs by a membrane. There is an inconspicuous nectar disc. Each flower yields at least 6 seeds.

== Ecology and uses ==
A number of Hygrophila species and cultivars are popular within the aquascaping and aquarium hobbies, including H. angustifolia, H. corymbosa, H. lancea 'Araguaia', H. pinnatifida, H. difformis 'Water Wisteria', H. odora, H. polysperma 'Indian swampweed' and H. siamensis. Additionally, there are some striking newer forms on the market, such as the vivid hybrids of Hygrophila polysperma, 'Sunset' and 'Rosanervig'.

Many members of the genus are troublesome weeds if they become established within irrigation systems, drains or drainage ditches, as well as in rice fields. Several have become established outside of their native ranges, either due to accidentally-discarded cuttings or deliberate release, such as H. polysperma in the southern United States.

== Species ==
77 species are accepted:

- Hygrophila abyssinica (Hochst. ex Nees) T.Anderson
- Hygrophila acinos (S.Moore) Heine
- Hygrophila acutangula Nees ex Mart.
- Hygrophila africana (T.Anderson) Heine
- Hygrophila albobracteata Vollesen
- Hygrophila angustifolia R.Br.
- Hygrophila anisocalyx Benoist
- Hygrophila anomala (Blatt.) M.R.Almeida
- Hygrophila asteracanthoides Lindau
- Hygrophila auriculata (Schumach.) Heine
- Hygrophila balsamica (L.f.) Raf.
- Hygrophila barbata (Nees) T.Anderson
- Hygrophila baronii S.Moore
- Hygrophila bengalensis S.K.Mandal, A.Bhattacharjee & Nayek
- Hygrophila biplicata (Nees) Sreem.
- Hygrophila borellii (Lindau) Heine
- Hygrophila brevituba (Burkill) Heine
- Hygrophila caerulea (Hochst.) T.Anderson
- Hygrophila cataractae S.Moore
- Hygrophila chevalieri Benoist
- Hygrophila ciliata (T.Anderson) Burkill
- Hygrophila ciliibractea Bremek.
- Hygrophila corymbosa (Blume) Lindau
- Hygrophila costata Nees
- Hygrophila didynama (Lindau) Heine
- Hygrophila difformis (L.f.) Blume
- Hygrophila episcopalis (Benoist) Benoist
- Hygrophila erecta (Burm.f.) Hochr.
- Hygrophila glandulifera Nees
- Hygrophila gossweileri (S.Moore) Heine
- Hygrophila gracillima (Schinz) Burkill
- Hygrophila griffithii (T.Anderson) Sreem.
- Hygrophila guianensis Nees
- Hygrophila hippuroides Lindau
- Hygrophila hirsuta Nees
- Hygrophila humistrata Rizzini
- Hygrophila incana Nees
- Hygrophila intermedia J.B.Imlay
- Hygrophila laevis (Nees) Lindau
- Hygrophila limnophiloides (S.Moore) Heine
- Hygrophila linearis Burkill
- Hygrophila madurensis (N.P.Balakr. & Subr.) Karthik. & Moorthy
- Hygrophila mediatrix Heine
- Hygrophila meianthos C.B.Clarke
- Hygrophila micrantha (Nees) T.Anderson
- Hygrophila modesta Benoist
- Hygrophila mutica (C.B.Clarke) Vollesen
- Hygrophila niokoloensis Berhaut
- Hygrophila odora (Nees) T.Anderson
- Hygrophila okavangensis P.G.Mey.
- Hygrophila origanoides (Lindau) Heine
- Hygrophila palmensis Pires de Lima
- Hygrophila paraibana Rizzini
- Hygrophila parishii (T.Anderson) Karthik. & Moorthy
- Hygrophila perrieri Benoist
- Hygrophila petiolata (Decne.) Lindau
- Hygrophila phlomoides Nees
- Hygrophila pinnatifida (Dalzell) Sreem.
- Hygrophila pobeguinii Benoist
- Hygrophila pogonocalyx Hayata
- Hygrophila polysperma (Roxb.) T.Anderson
- Hygrophila pusilla Blume
- Hygrophila richardsiae Vollesen
- Hygrophila ringens (L.) R.Br. ex Spreng.
- Hygrophila sandwithii Bremek.
- Hygrophila senegalensis (Nees) T.Anderson
- Hygrophila serpyllum (Nees) T.Anderson
- Hygrophila spiciformis Lindau
- Hygrophila stocksii T.Anderson ex C.B.Clarke
- Hygrophila subsessilis C.B.Clarke
- Hygrophila surinamensis Bremek.
- Hygrophila thwaitesii (T.Anderson) Heine
- Hygrophila thymus (Nees) Sunojk. & M.G.Prasad
- Hygrophila tyttha Leonard
- Hygrophila uliginosa S.Moore
- Hygrophila urquiolae Greuter, R.Rankin & Palmarola
- Hygrophila velata Benoist

== Gallery ==
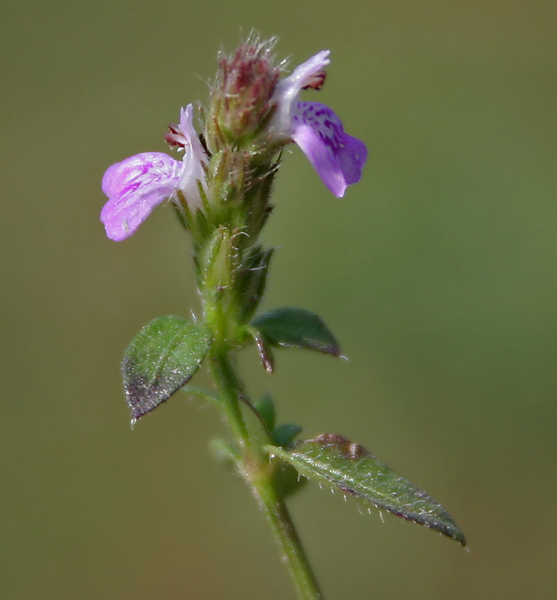
Hygrophila serpyllum

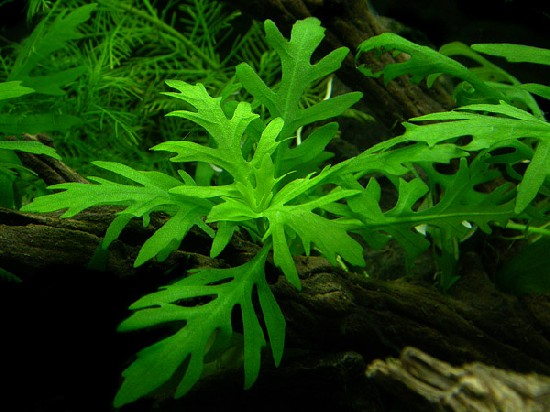
Hygrophila difformis

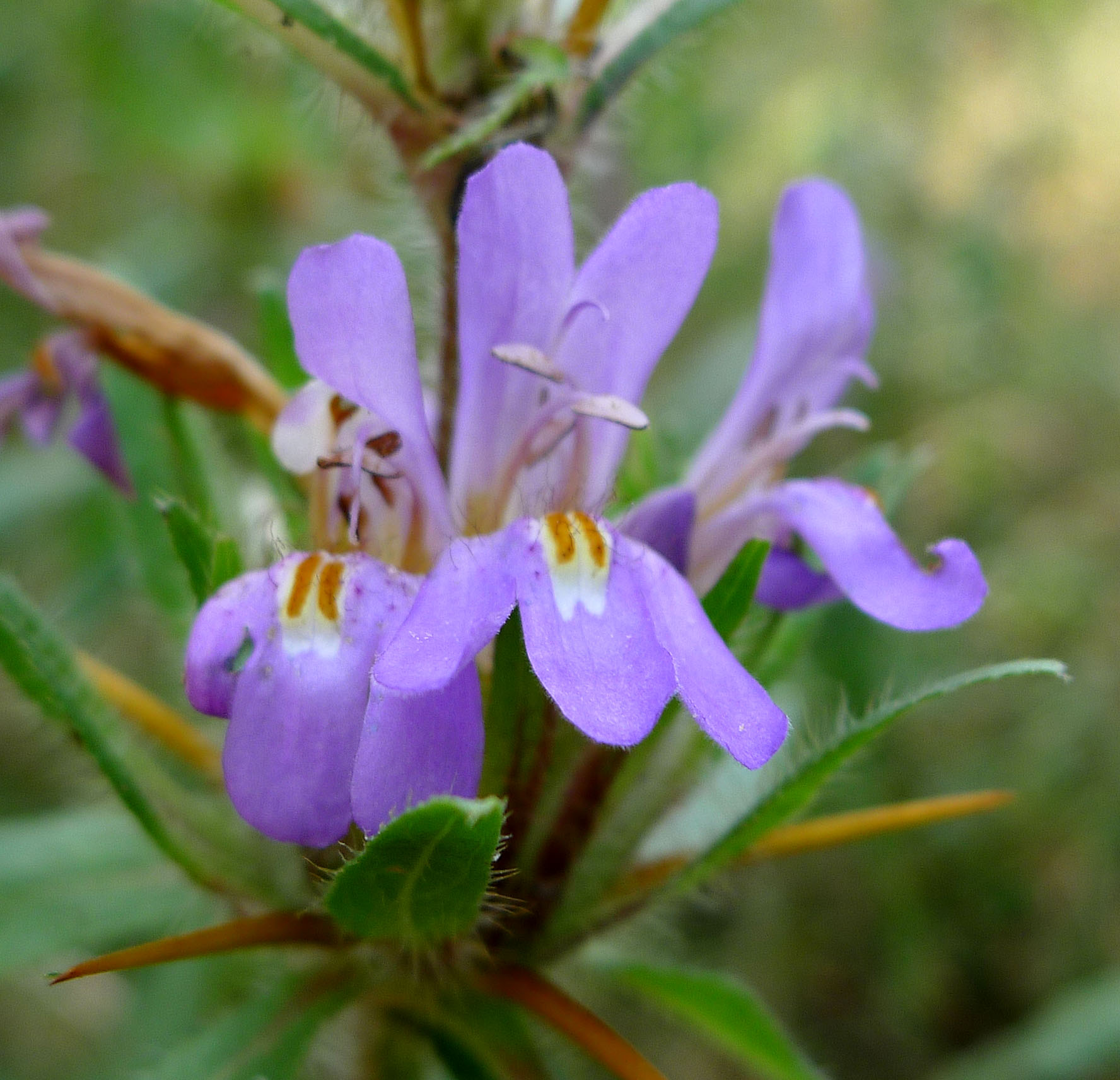
Hygrophila schulli

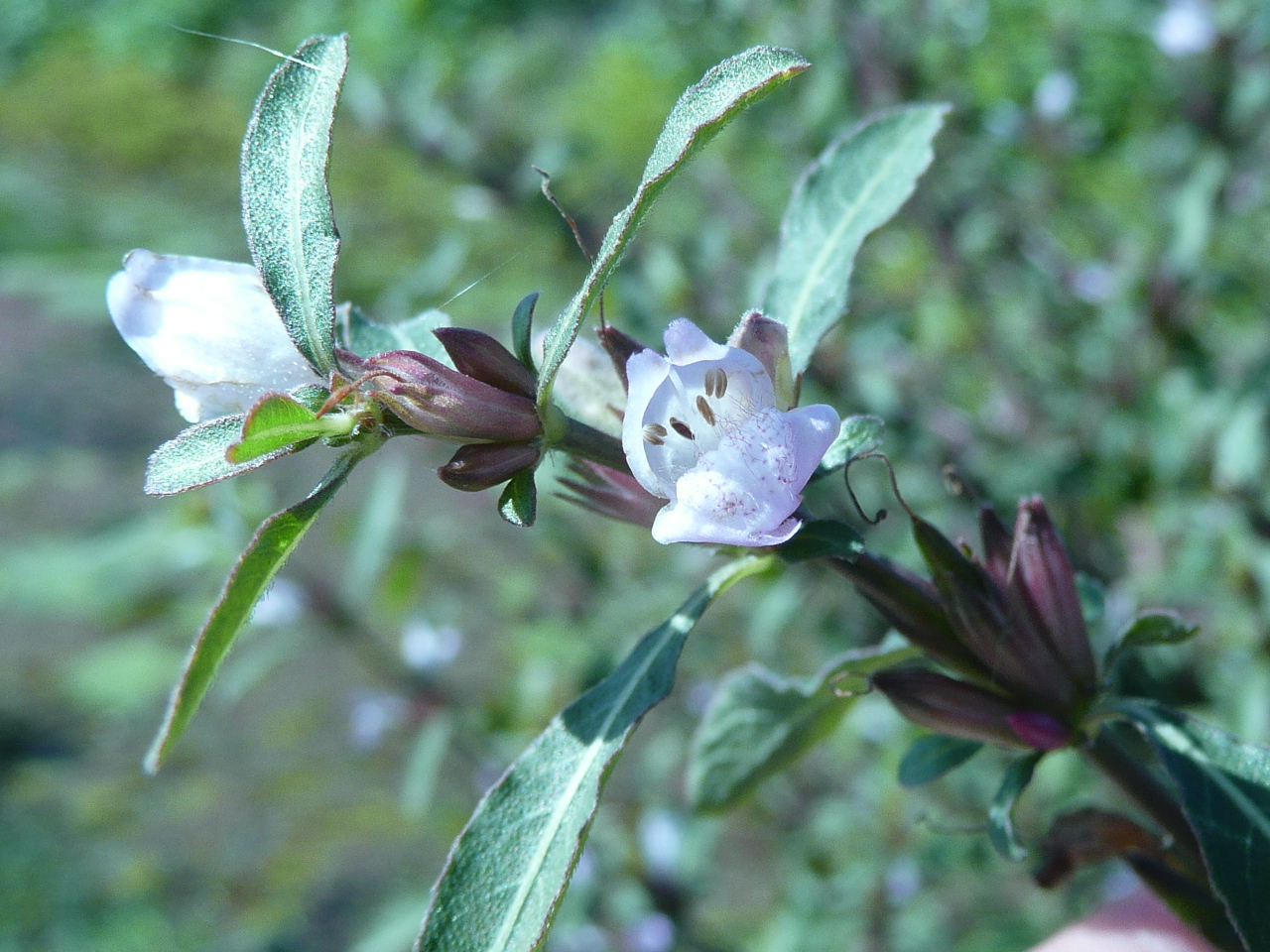
Hygrophila pogonocalyx
