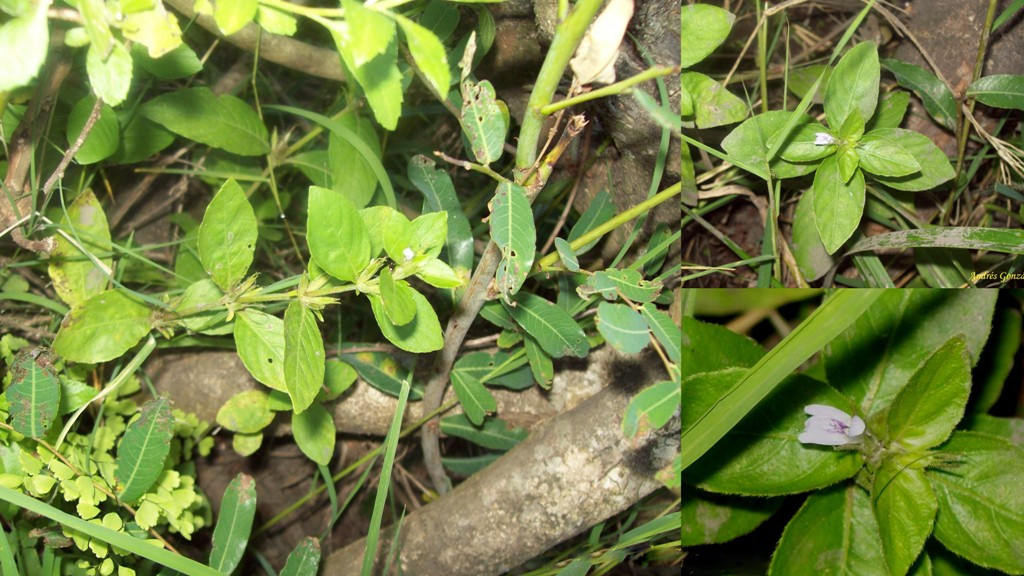

Scientific classification
- Kingdom: Plantae
- Clade: Tracheophytes
- Clade: Angiosperms
- Clade: Eudicots
- Clade: Asterids
- Order: Lamiales
- Family: Acanthaceae
- Genus: Hygrophila
- Species: H. costata

Binomial name
- Hygrophila costata Sinning

Synonyms
- Hygrophila atricheta Bridar.; Hygrophila brasiliensis Spreng.; Hygrophila conferta Nees; Hygrophila guianensis Nees; Hygrophila lacustris Morong & Britton; Hygrophila longifolia (Mart.) Nees; Hygrophila portoricensis Nees; Hygrophila pubescens Nees; Hygrophila rivularis Nees; Ruellia brasiliensis Mart. ex Nees; Ruellia costata Lindau; Scorodoxylum costata (Nees) Hiern

= Hygrophila costata =

Species of aquatic plant

Hygrophila costata, with the common names glush weed, gulf swampweed, and yerba de hicotea, is an aquatic plant.

The plant is endemic is native to Neotropic ecoregions. It is native to Florida, the Caribbean, southern Mexico, Central America, and South America.

This plant is cited in Flora Brasiliensis by Carl Friedrich Philipp von Martius, and is found in the Cerrado ecoregion of Brazil.

In addition, Hygrophila costata is an invasive and dominating species in several parts of the world included Australia because this plant is usually like a freshwater aquarium plant.
