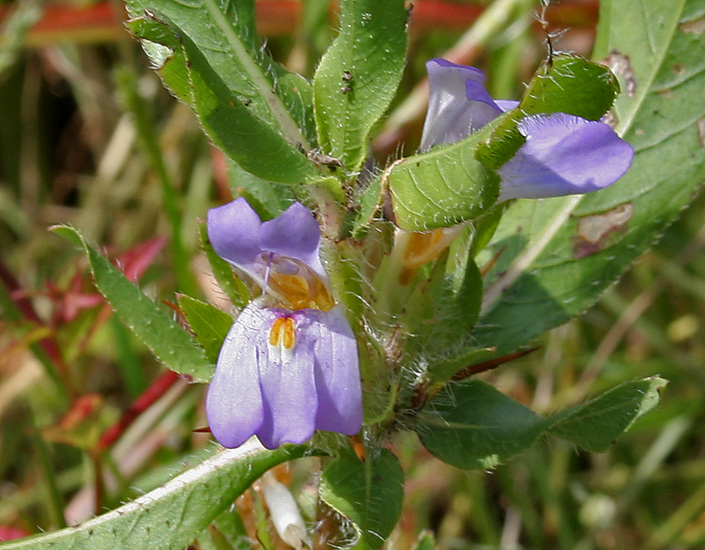

Scientific classification
- Kingdom: Plantae
- Clade: Tracheophytes
- Clade: Angiosperms
- Clade: Eudicots
- Clade: Asterids
- Order: Lamiales
- Family: Acanthaceae
- Genus: Hygrophila
- Species: H. auriculata

Binomial name
- Hygrophila auriculata Schumach.

Synonyms
- List: Asteracantha auriculata Nees; Asteracantha lindaviana De Wild. & T.Durand; Asteracantha longifolia (L.) Nees; Asteracantha macracantha Hochst. ex A.Rich.; Bahel schulli Buch.-Ham.; Barleria auriculata Schumach.; Barleria cornigera Very ex Nees; Barleria glabrata Vahl ex Nees; Barleria hexacantha Bertol.; Barleria hexacantha Moris; Barleria longifolia L.; Barleria macracantha R.Br.; Barleria spinosa Hook. ex Nees; Hygrophila lindaviana (De Wild. & T.Durand) Burkill; Hygrophila longifolia (L.) Kurz; Hygrophila schulli M.R.Almeida & S.M.Almeida; Hygrophila schulli var. alba Parmar; Hygrophila spinosa T.Anderson; Ruellia longifolia (L.) Roxb.; Tenoria undulata Dehnh.

= Hygrophila auriculata =

Species of flowering plant

Hygrophila auriculata (Sanskrit: gokaṇṭa, Bangla (বাংলা নাম): kulekhara (কুলেখাড়া) kokilākṣa) is a herbaceous, medicinal plant in the acanthus family that grows in marshy places and is native to tropical Asia and Africa. In India it is commonly known as kokilaksha or gokulakanta, in Sri Lanka as neeramulli. In Kerala and Tamil Nadu it is called vayalchulli (വയൽച്ചുളളി) and Neermulli (நீர்முள்ளி) respectively, and in the Telugu states, it is known as Godugu-gaddi (గొడుగుగడ్డి) or Gruddi-kamanchi (గ్రుడ్డికామంచి).

== Medicinal usage in Ayurveda ==
In ayurveda, its seeds, roots and panchanga (pancha = five and anga = parts, i.e. root, flowers, stem, fruits and leaves as ash burnt together) are used as a medication. It has hepatoprotective and antioxidant activity and can reduce toxic accumulation from certain therapies.
