= Mother of pearl (disambiguation) =

Mother of pearl is a common name for nacre, a composite material formed by molluscs. Mother of pearl, also spelt mother-of-pearl, may also refer to:

== Biology ==
- Catasetum pileatum, commonly known as mother of pearl flower
- Patania ruralis, commonly known as mother of pearl moth
- Two genera of butterflies:
  - Protogoniomorpha, commonly known as mother-of-pearls
  - Salamis (butterfly), commonly known as mother-of-pearls

== Songs ==
- "Mother of Pearl", a song by Roxy Music from the album Stranded
- "Mother of Pearl", a song by Nellie McKay from the album Obligatory Villagers

== Other uses ==
- Mother of Pearl (novel), a 1999 novel by Melinda Haynes
- Mother-of-pearl cloud, another name for a polar stratospheric cloud
- "Mother of Pearl" (Frankie Drake Mysteries), a 2017 television episode

== See also ==
- Mother-of-pearl carving in Bethlehem, a traditional handicraft
