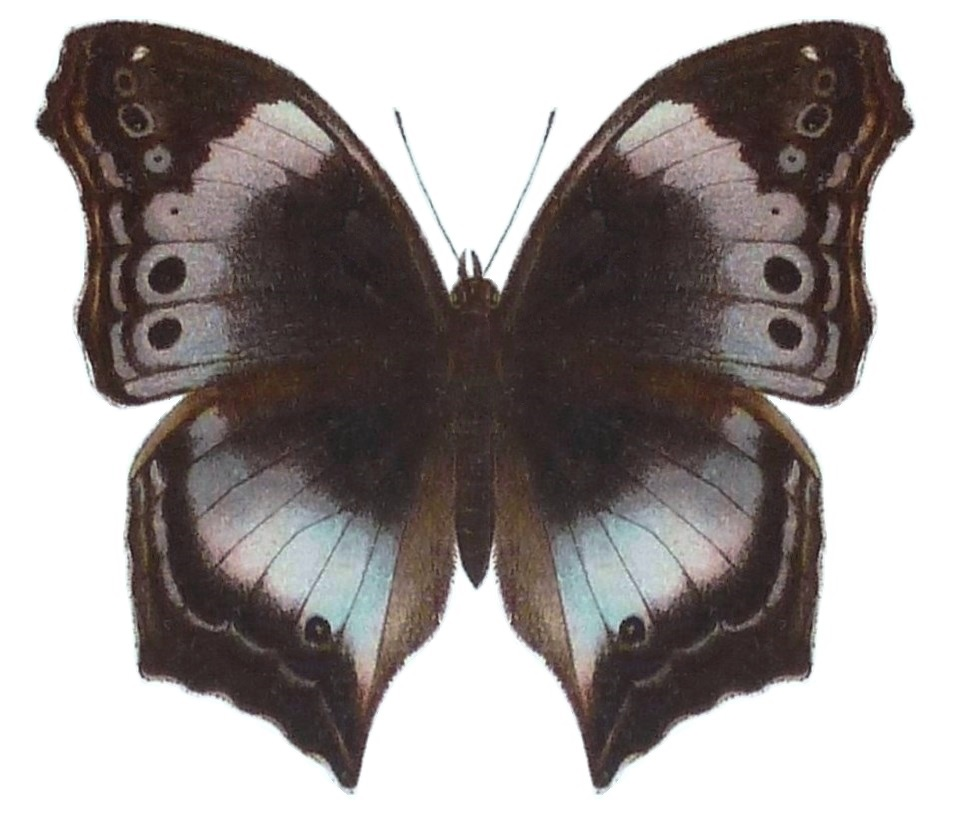

Scientific classification
- Kingdom: Animalia
- Phylum: Arthropoda
- Clade: Pancrustacea
- Class: Insecta
- Order: Lepidoptera
- Family: Nymphalidae
- Genus: Protogoniomorpha
- Species: P. cytora

Binomial name
- Protogoniomorpha cytora (Doubleday, [1847])
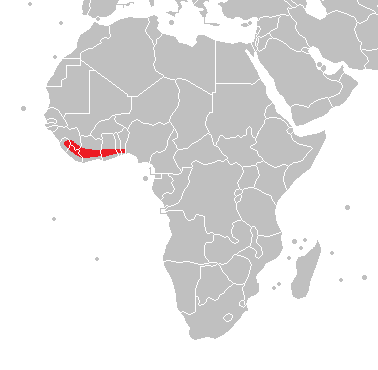
- Approximate range

Synonyms
- Junonia cytora Doubleday, 1847; Salamis cytora

= Protogoniomorpha cytora =

Western blue beauty

Species of butterfly

Junonia cytora, formerly Protogoniomorpha cytora, the western blue beauty, is a butterfly in the family Nymphalidae. It is found in Guinea, Sierra Leone, Liberia, Ivory Coast, Ghana, Togo, and Benin. The habitat consists of open spaces in primary forests and mature secondary forests.

The larvae feed on Acanthaceae species.

== Taxonomy ==
Protogoniomorpha cytora was first described as member of the genus Junonia, it was then reassigned to the genus Salamis. In the genus Salamis, P. cytora was considered to be a member of the Protogoniomorpha-group, and was moved accordingly into a separate genus following phylogenetic research. The species is now included in the genus Junonia.

Torben Larsen developed a species numbering system for his 2005 publication Butterflies of West Africa. This species was described as Salamis cytora #809. The 'Larsen' number has been used with permission for its description as Junonia cytors in A Sharp Eye on Butterflies of Ghana.
