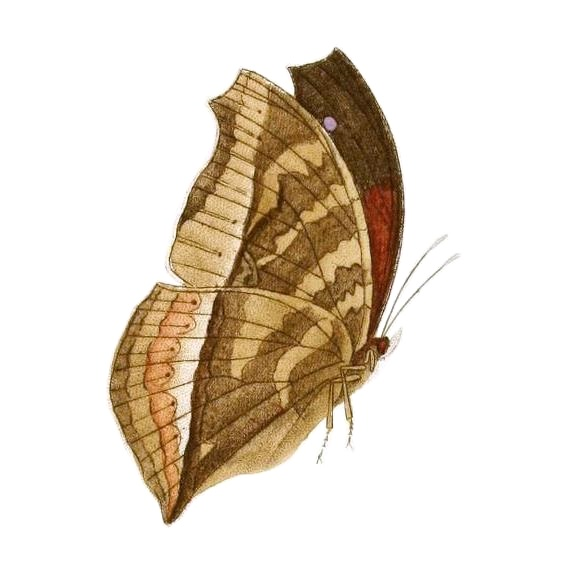

Scientific classification
- Domain: Eukaryota
- Kingdom: Animalia
- Phylum: Arthropoda
- Class: Insecta
- Order: Lepidoptera
- Family: Nymphalidae
- Genus: Salamis
- Species: S. augustina

Binomial name
- Salamis augustina Boisduval, 1833

Synonyms
- Salamis vinsoni Le Cerf, 1922

= Salamis augustina =

Species of butterfly

Salamis augustina is a butterfly in the family Nymphalidae. It is found on Mauritius and Réunion.

Adults closely resemble Euploea euphon, of which it may be a mimic. They are on wing from April to May. Subspecies vinsoni is on wing from April to September.

== Subspecies ==
- Salamis augustina augustina — La Reunion
- Salamis augustina vinsoni Le Cerf, 1922 — Mauritius
