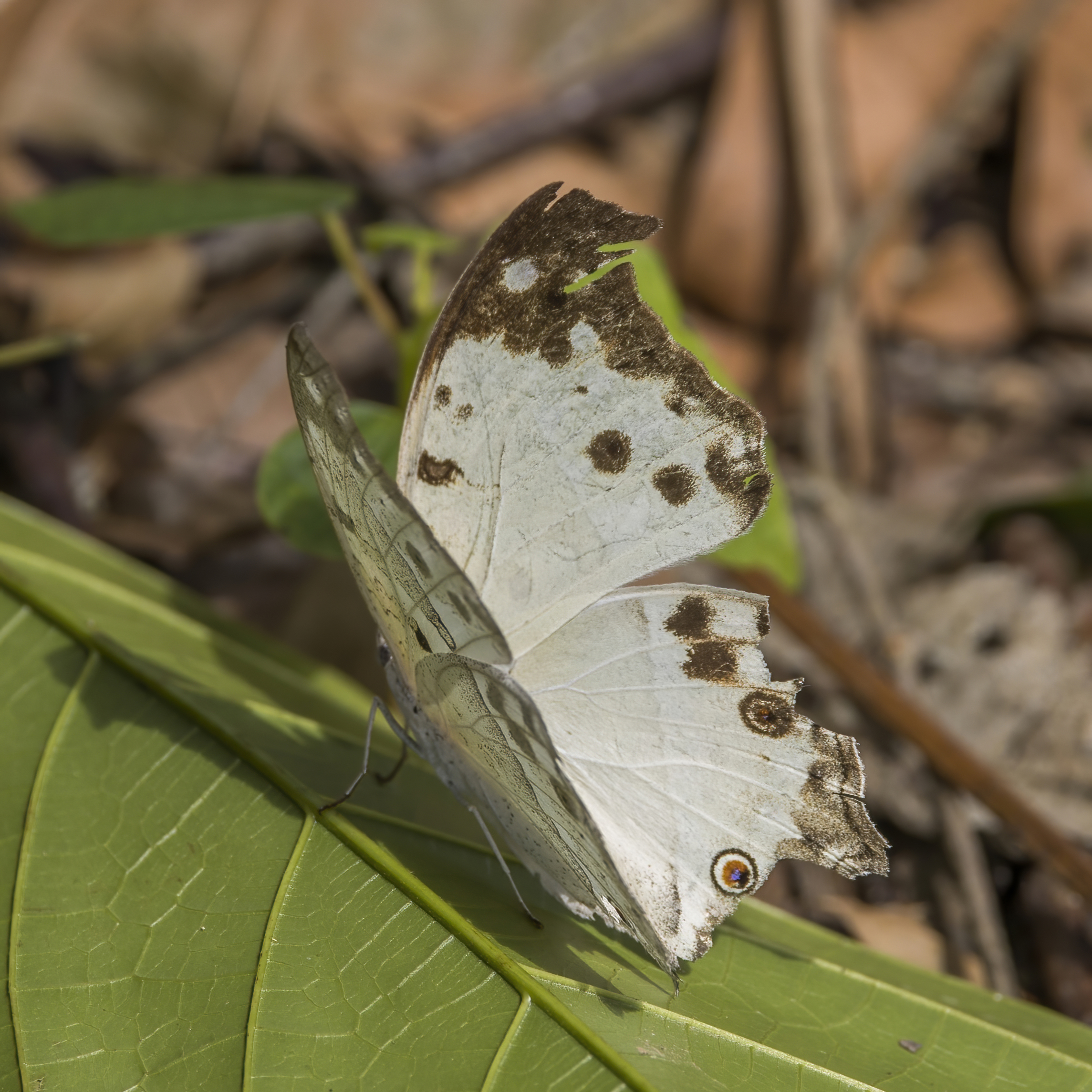
- P. a. anacardii, Ghana
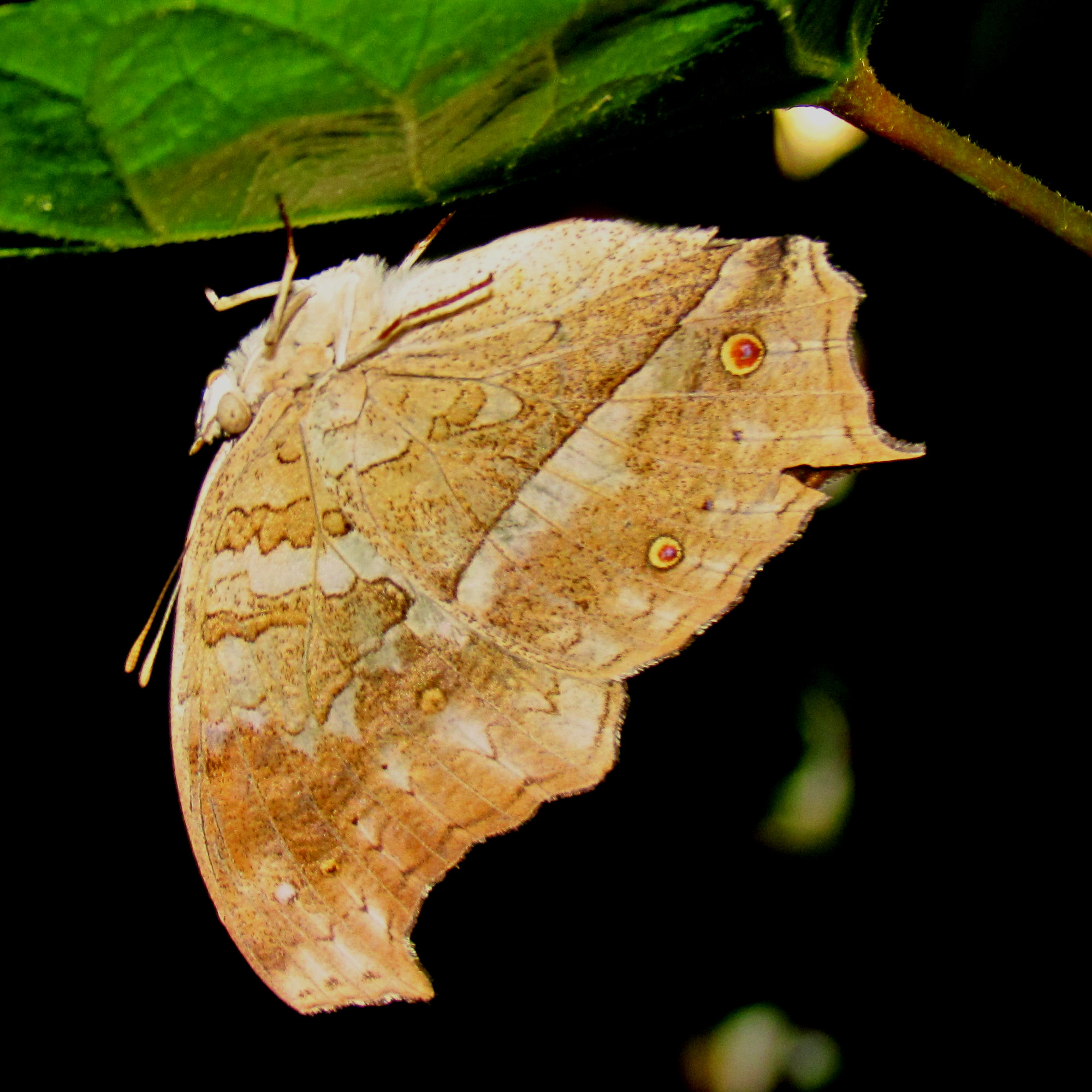
- Underside

Conservation status
- Least Concern (IUCN 3.1)

Scientific classification
- Kingdom: Animalia
- Phylum: Arthropoda
- Clade: Pancrustacea
- Class: Insecta
- Order: Lepidoptera
- Family: Nymphalidae
- Genus: Protogoniomorpha
- Species: P. anacardii

Binomial name
- Protogoniomorpha anacardii (Linnaeus, 1758)
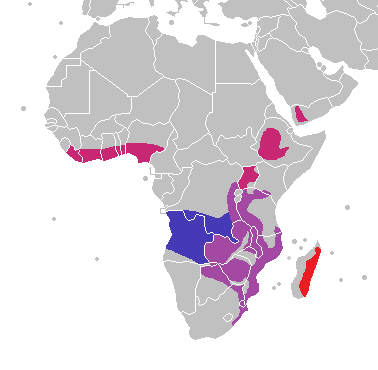
- Approximate range P. a. anacardii (Linnaeus, 1758) P. a. nebulosa (Trimen, 1881) P. a. ansorgei (Rothschild, 1904) P. (a.) duprei (Vinson, 1863)

Synonyms
- Papilio anacardii Linnaeus, 1758; Salamis anacardii; Salamis anacardii ansorgei Rothschild, 1904; Salamis definata Butler, 1879; Salamis duprei var. billerei Oberthür, 1925; Salamis nebulosa Trimen, 1881; Salamis anacardii var. lurida Niepelt, 1920; Salamis anacardii f. formosa Stoneham, 1965; Protogoniomorpha anacardii nebulosa f. trimeni van Son, 1979

= Protogoniomorpha anacardii =

Clouded mother-of-pearl

Species of butterfly

Protogoniomorpha anacardii, the clouded mother-of-pearl, is a species of Nymphalidae butterfly found in tropical Africa, and in Arabia (P. a. nebulosa: Saudi Arabia and Yemen)

The wingspan of this species is 55–68 mm for males and 65–75 mm for females.

Its flight period is year-round, peaking in summer and autumn.

P. anacardii caterpillars eat Asystasia, Brillantaisia, Isoglossa, Justicia, Mimulopsis, and Paulowilhelmia flowers. The dorsal side of this species' wings are stark white with dark spots by the outer margin and two yellow eye spots near the bottom. The ventral side of this species' wings resemble a dead leaf.

== Subspecies ==
- P. a. anacardii — Sierra Leone, Ivory Coast, Ghana, Togo, western Nigeria, Central African Republic to the Rift Valley
- P. a. ansorgei (Rothschild, 1904) — Angola, southern Democratic Republic of the Congo
- P. a. nebulosa Trimen, 1881 — Democratic Republic of the Congo, Ethiopia, Kenya, Tanzania, Zambia, Mozambique, Zimbabwe, Botswana, Saudi Arabia, South Africa, Eswatini, Yemen

Torben Larsen developed a species numbering system for his 2005 publication Butterflies of West Africa. The nominate subspecies is #812. The 'Larsen' numbers have since been used with permission in A Sharp Eye on Butterflies of Ghana.

== Gallery ==
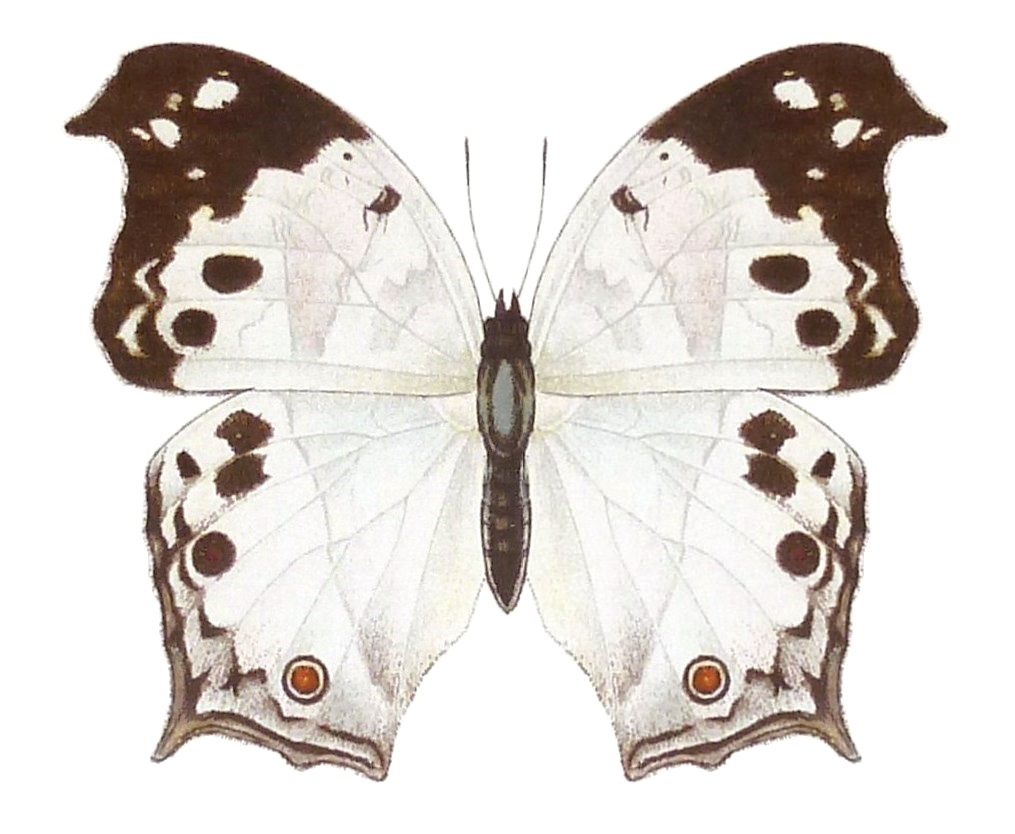
P. a. anacardii

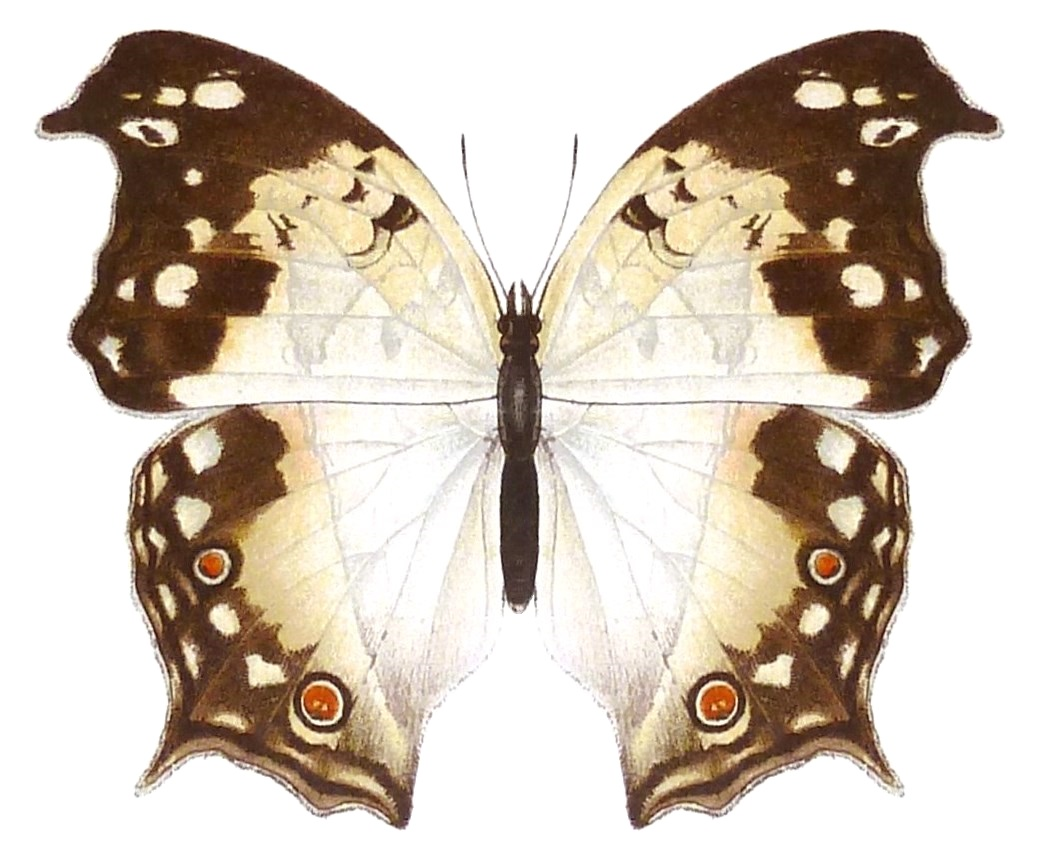
P. a. nebulosa f. trimeni (female dry-season form)

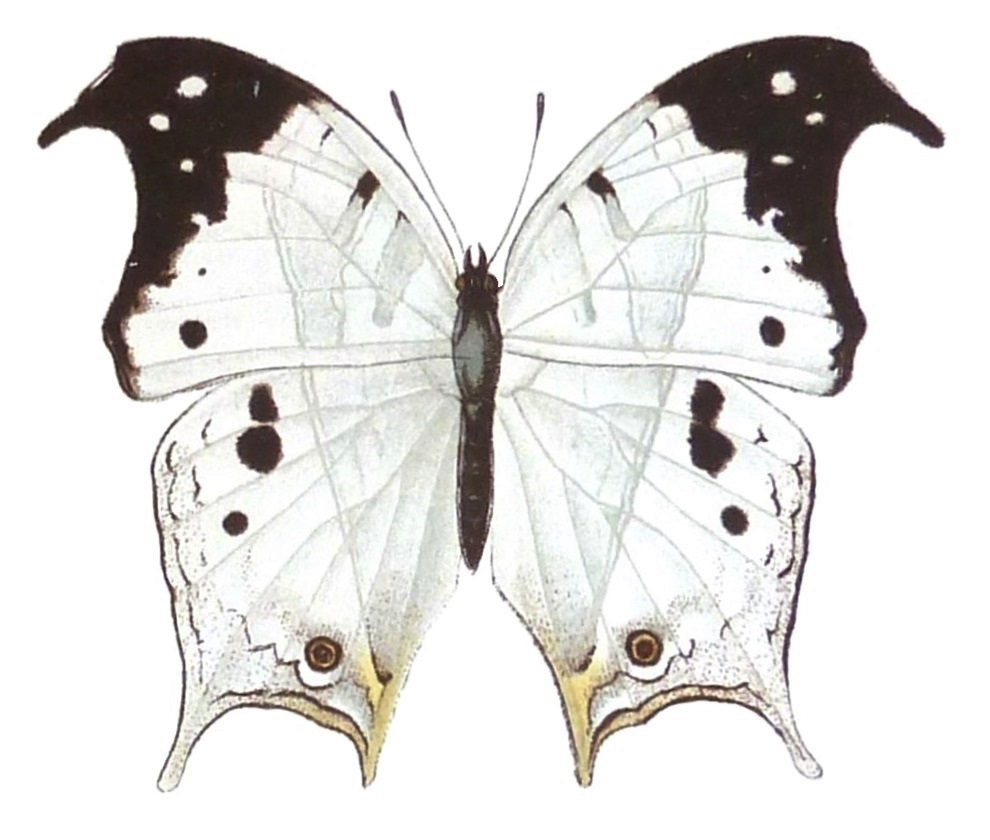
P. a. duprei

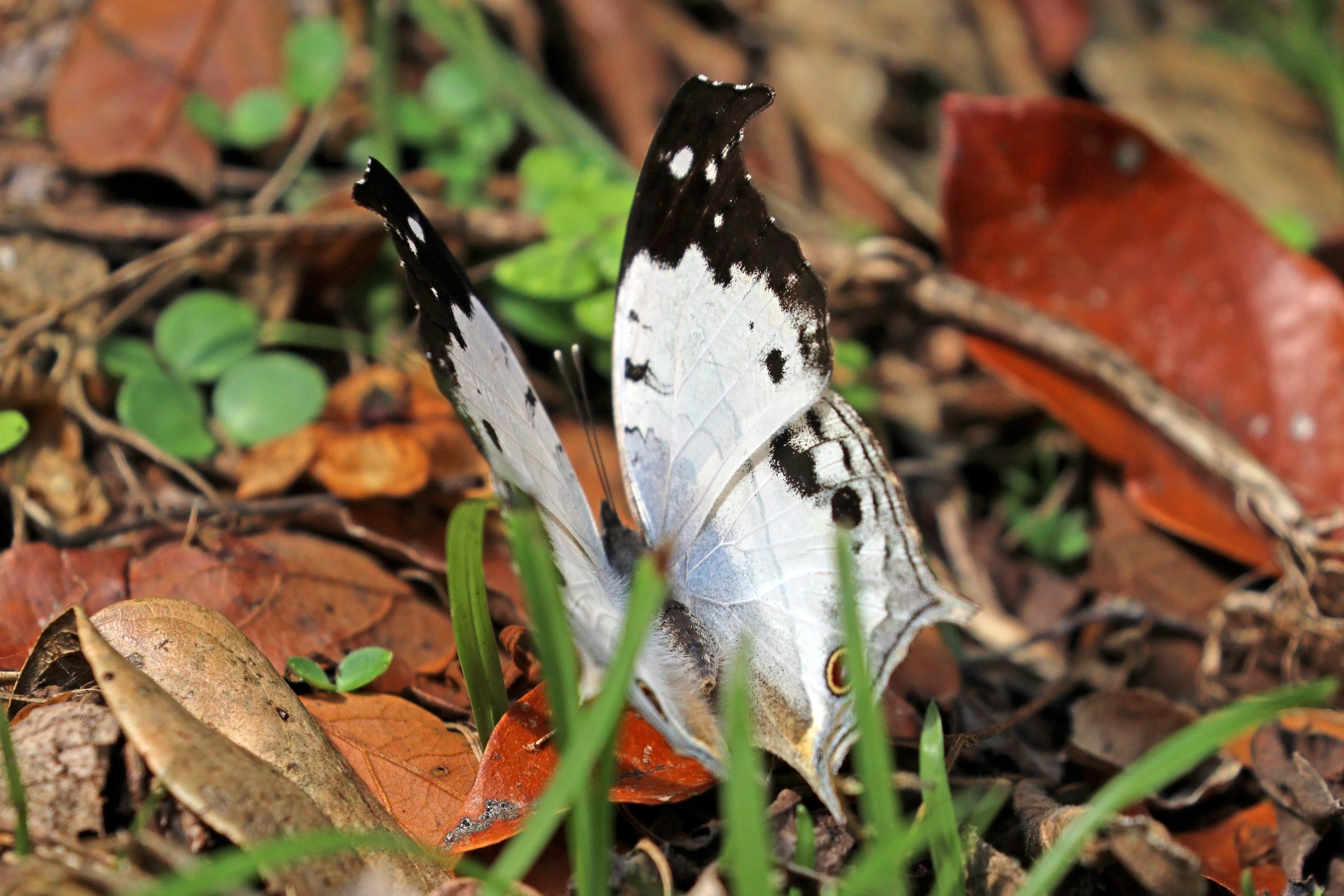
P. a. duprei

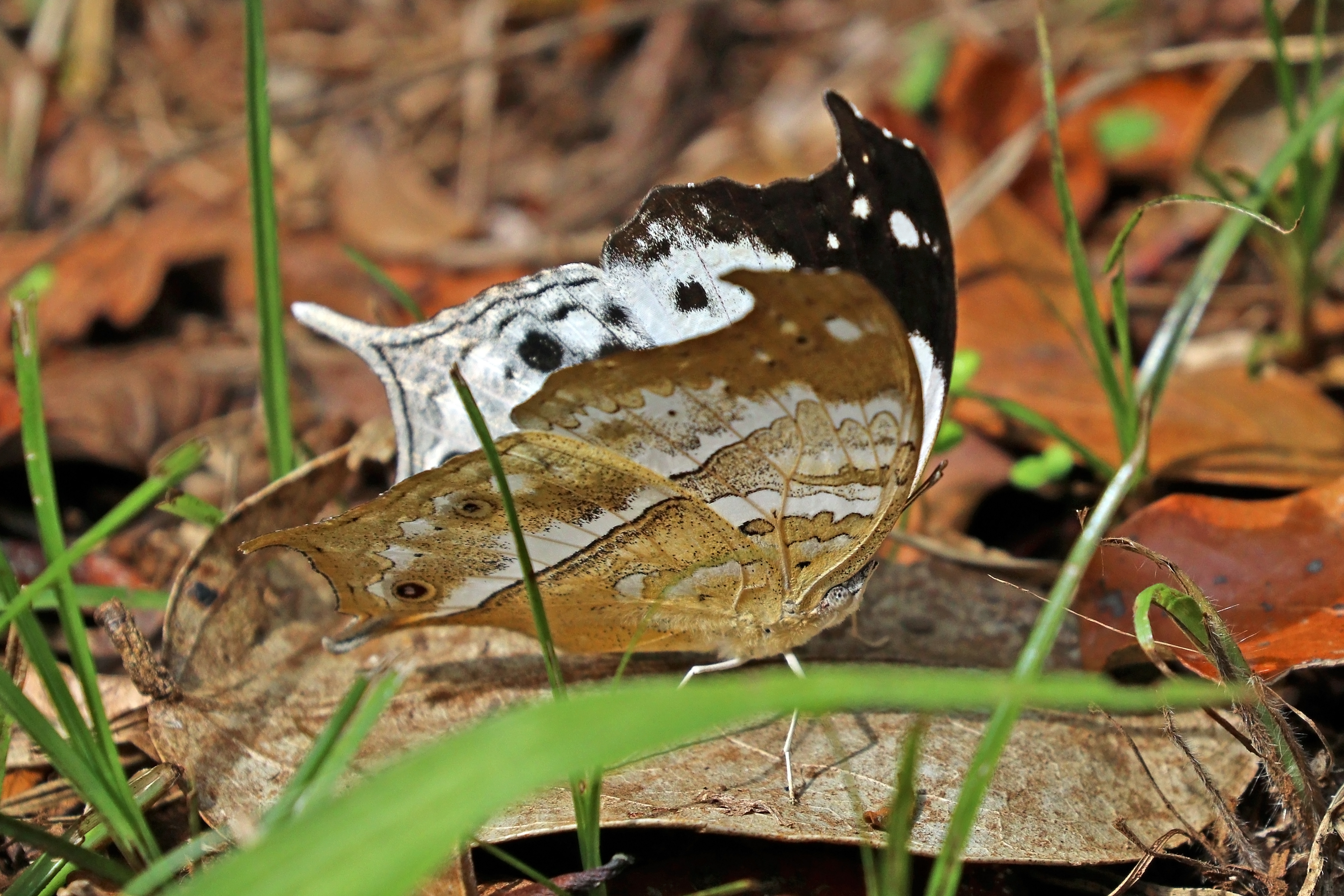
P. a. duprei

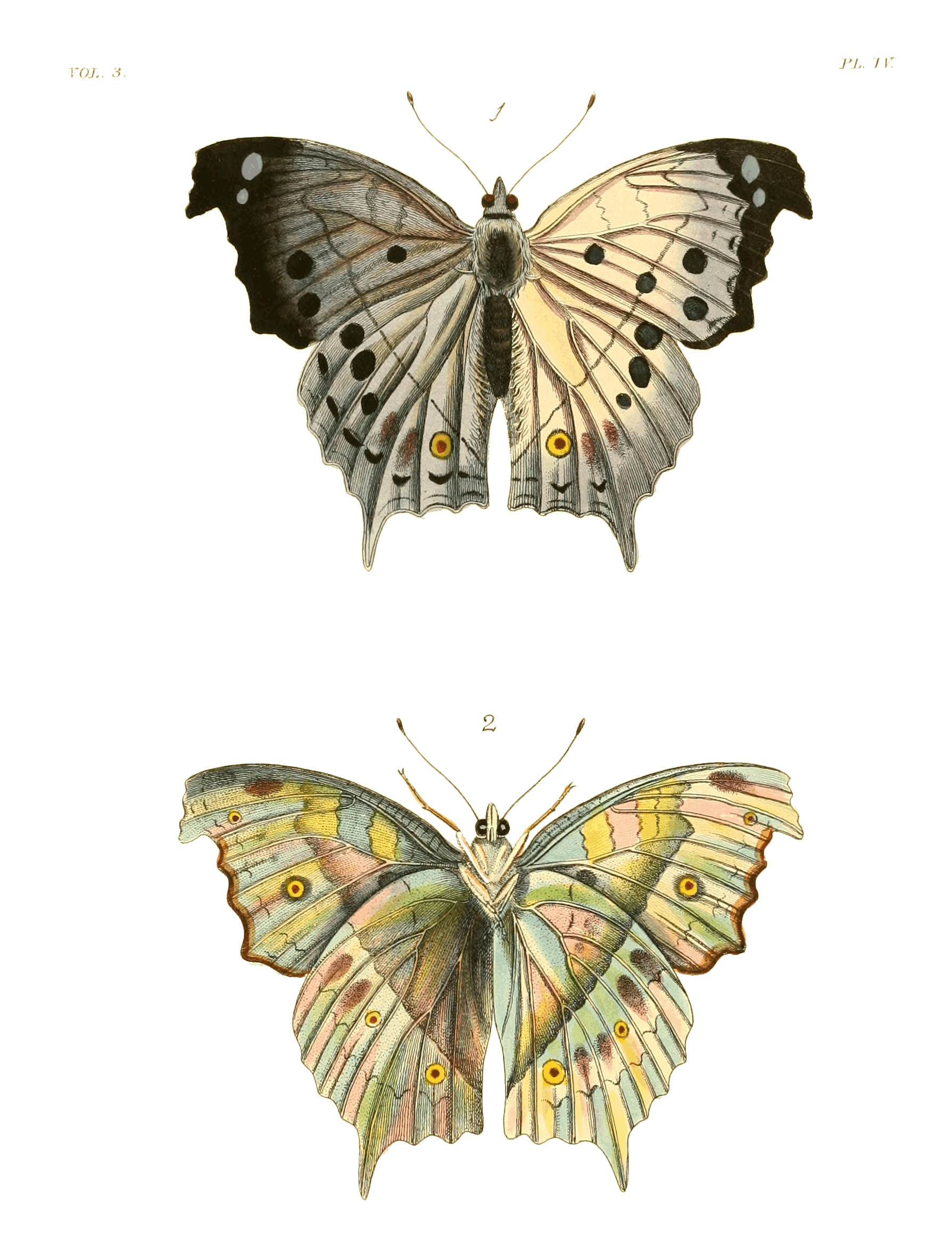
Vanesa anacardii (= Protogoniomorpha anacardii) by Dru Drury
