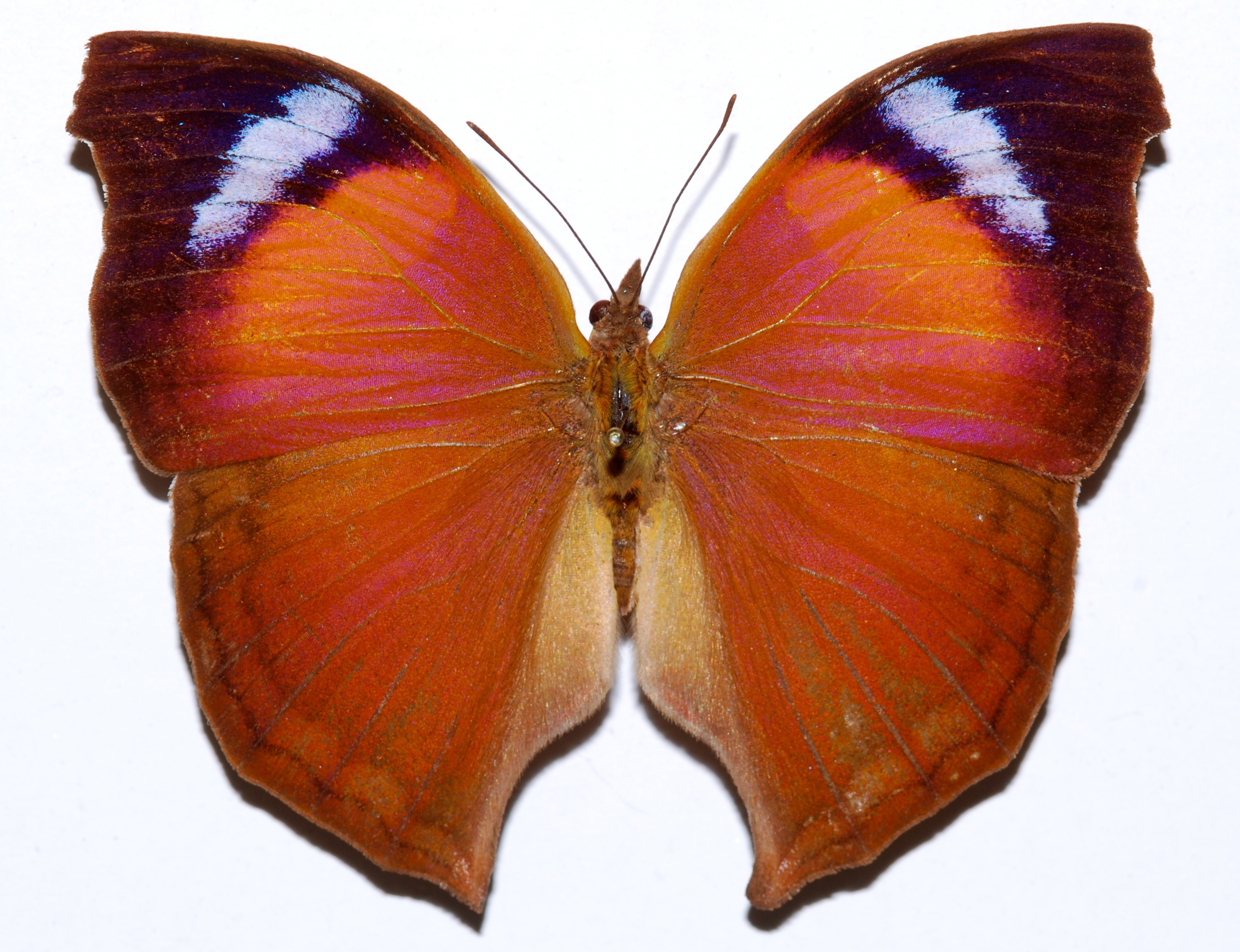

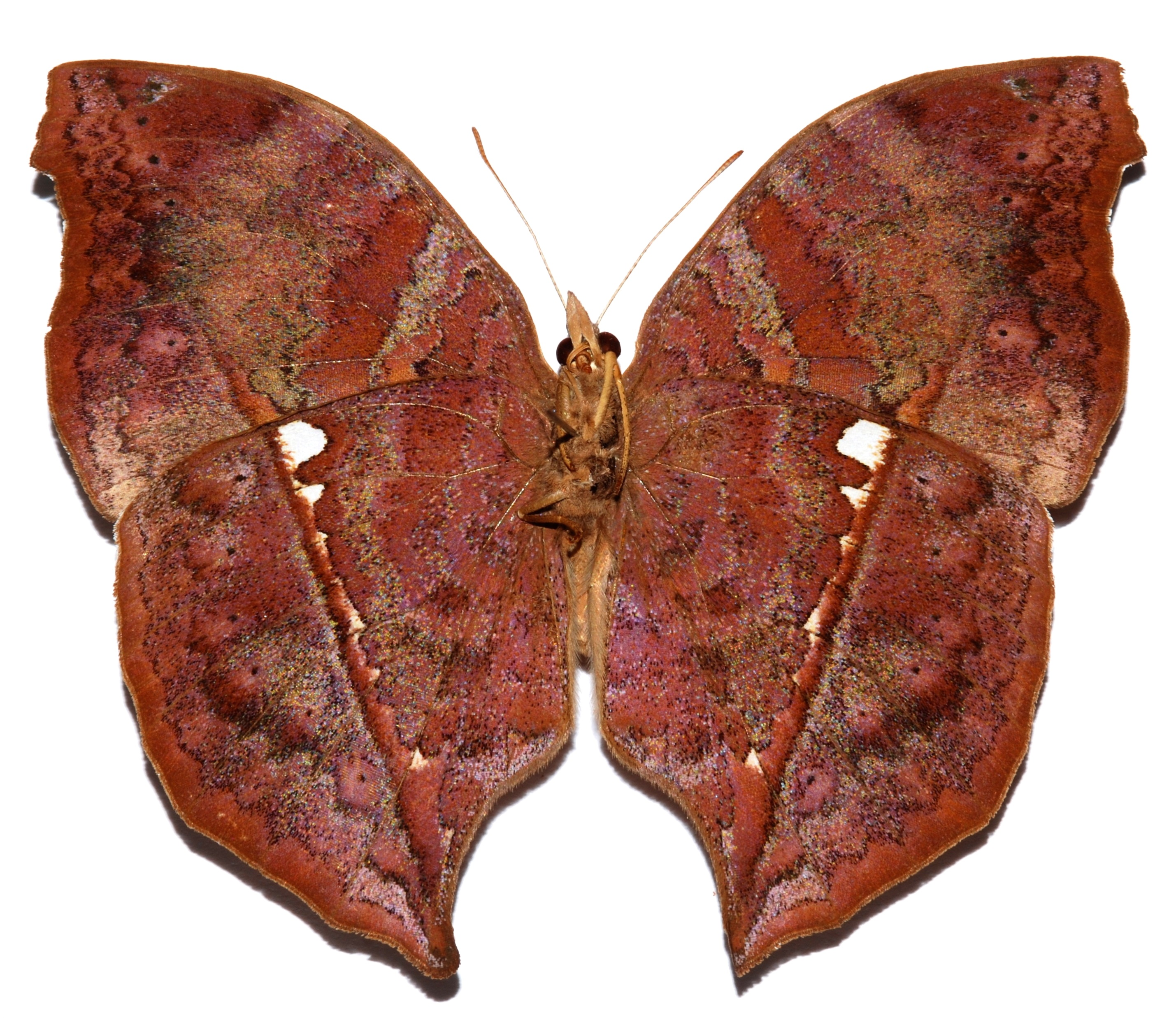

Scientific classification
- Domain: Eukaryota
- Kingdom: Animalia
- Phylum: Arthropoda
- Class: Insecta
- Order: Lepidoptera
- Family: Nymphalidae
- Genus: Salamis
- Species: S. anteva

Binomial name
- Salamis anteva (Ward, 1870)

Synonyms
- Junonia anteva Ward, 1870; Salamis anteva var. lambertoni Oberthür, 1923

= Salamis anteva =

Species of butterfly

Salamis anteva is a butterfly in the family Nymphalidae. It is found on Madagascar. The habitat consists of forests.

It is a butterfly with a black body covered with orange-brown hair; claviform antennae; above the orange-colored, anterior wings edged with black integrating a bluish-whitish spot; posterior also orange and margins along the veins of the wing brown - black. The underside is gray - black and reminds of a dead leaf, which serves as camouflage; a whitish line runs through the wings of the posterior edge of the hindwing of the anterior edge of the forewing: between this "line" and the body, the wings are darker than between the "line" and the edges of the wings. Its wings are bent.
