= Brillantaisia lancifolia =

Conservation status
- Vulnerable (IUCN 3.1)

Scientific classification
- Kingdom: Plantae
- Clade: Tracheophytes
- Clade: Angiosperms
- Clade: Eudicots
- Clade: Asterids
- Order: Lamiales
- Family: Acanthaceae
- Genus: Brillantaisia
- Species: B. lancifolia

Binomial name
- Brillantaisia lancifolia Lindau

Species of flowering plant

Brillantaisia lancifolia is a species of plant in the family Acanthaceae. It is found in Cameroon, Gabon, and Nigeria. Its natural habitats are subtropical or tropical moist lowland forests and rivers. It is threatened by habitat loss.
