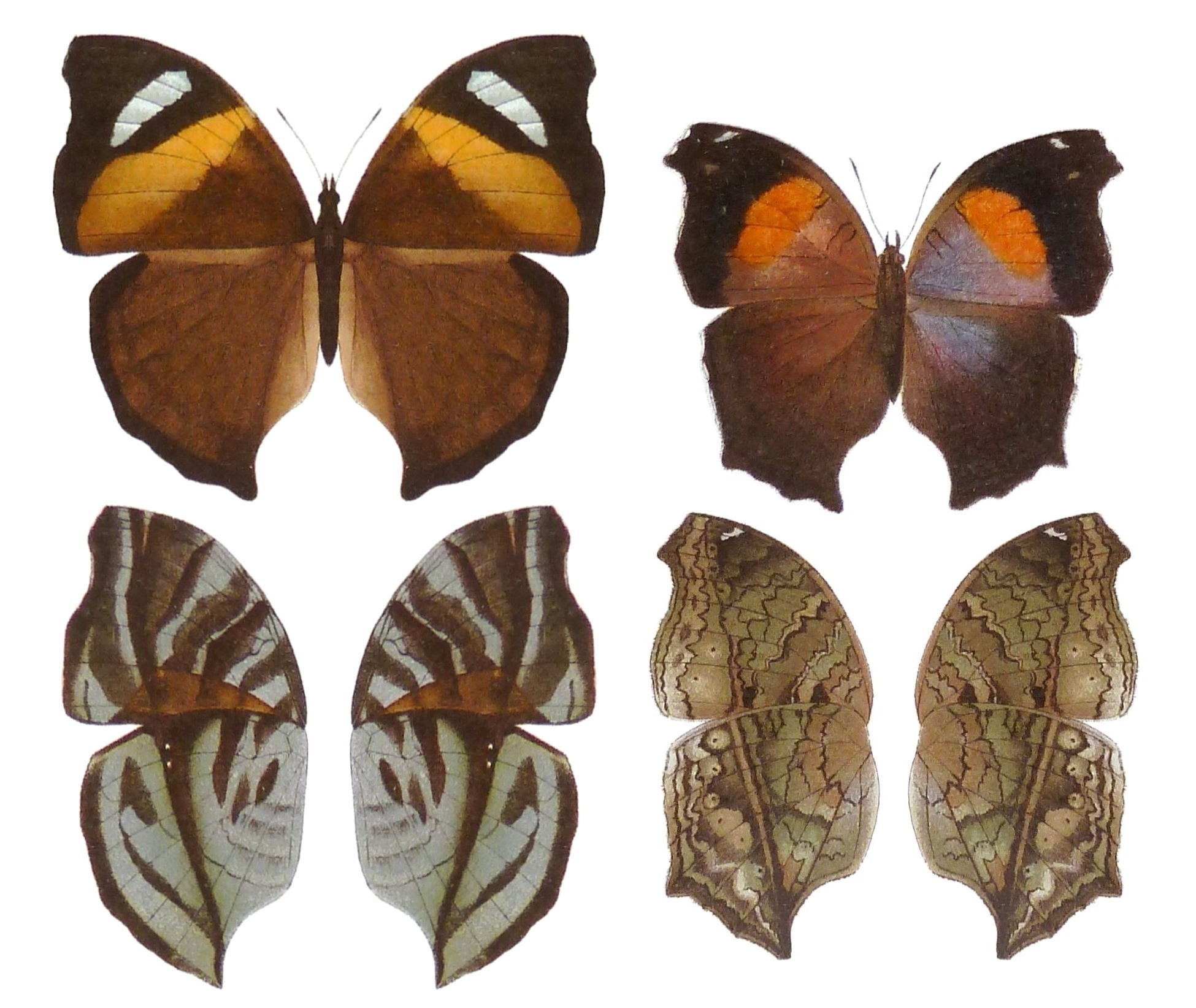
- Salamis anteva & Salamis cacta

Scientific classification
- Domain: Eukaryota
- Kingdom: Animalia
- Phylum: Arthropoda
- Class: Insecta
- Order: Lepidoptera
- Family: Nymphalidae
- Subfamily: Nymphalinae
- Tribe: Junoniini
- Genus: Salamis; Boisduval, 1833

Species
- See text

= Salamis (butterfly) =

Genus of butterflies

Salamis is a genus of nymphalid butterflies. They are commonly known as mother-of-pearls and are found in Africa. Salamis was a nymph in Greek mythology, the daughter of the river god Asopus and Metope, daughter of the Ladon, another river god.

== Taxonomy ==
The earliest description of species in this genus were published in the second half of the 18th century by Linnaeus, Drury and Fabricius in the genus Papilio. In 1833, Boisduval created the genus Salamis with the description of S. augustina. The three previously described species of Papilio (P. anacardii, P. parhassus and P. cacta) were then added to the genus Salamis. Similarly, multiple species first described in the 19th century in the related genus of Junonia were later reassigned to this genus.

Recent phylogenetic studies have supported the proposal to consider the group of Protogoniomorpha, which was often considered to be a part of Salamis, as a distinct genus.

== Species ==
Alphabetical order:

- Salamis anteva (Ward, 1870)
- Salamis augustina Boisduval, 1833
- Salamis cacta (Fabricius, 1793) – lilac mother-of-pearl or lilac beauty
- Salamis humbloti Turlin, 1994

See also the species of Protogoniomorpha previously ordered in Salamis
