= Salamis humbloti =

Scientific classification
- Kingdom: Animalia
- Phylum: Arthropoda
- Clade: Pancrustacea
- Class: Insecta
- Order: Lepidoptera
- Family: Nymphalidae
- Genus: Salamis
- Species: S. humbloti

Binomial name
- Salamis humbloti Turlin, 1994

Species of butterfly

Salamis humbloti is a butterfly in the family Nymphalidae. It is found on the Comoros.
