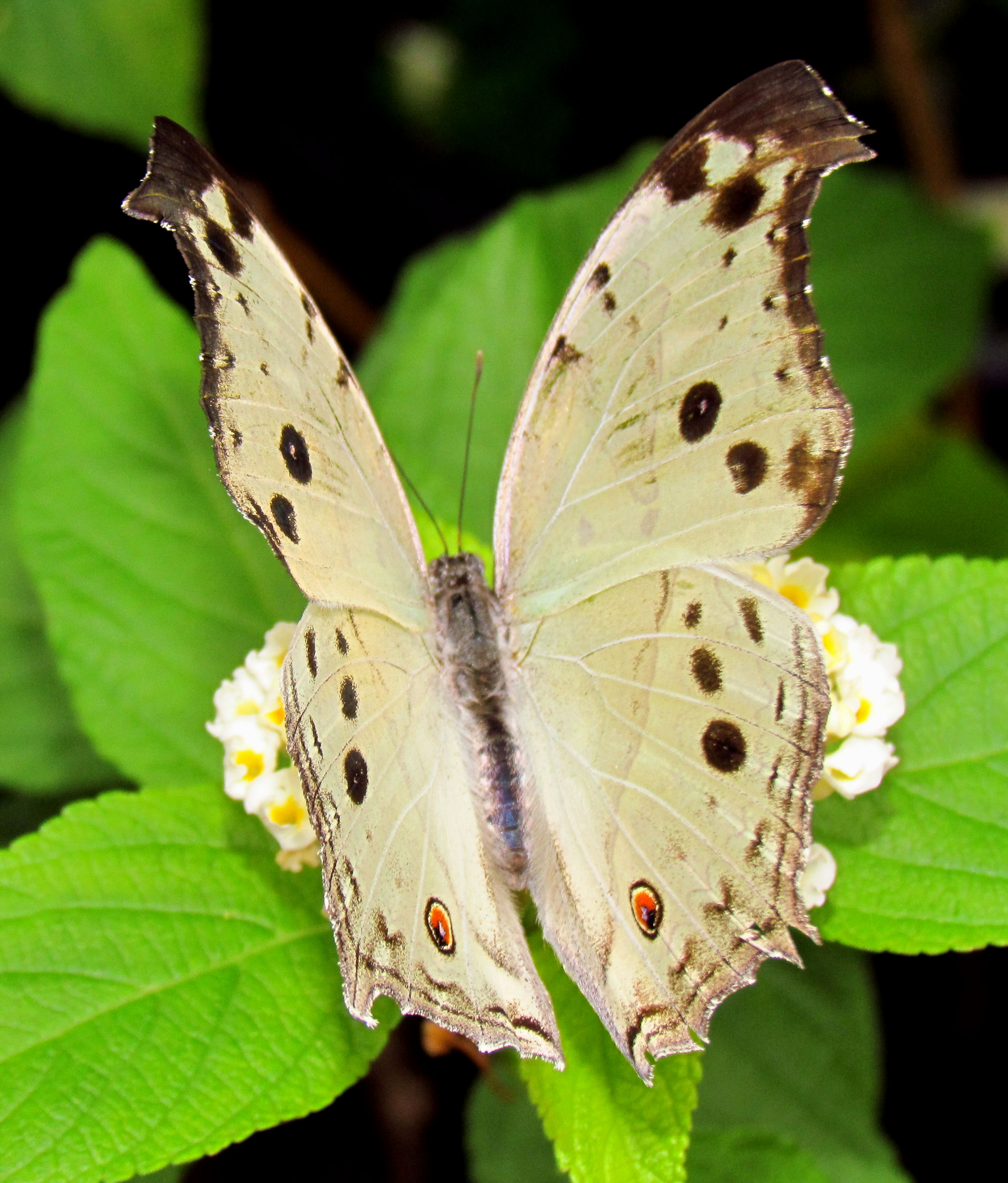
- possibly P. p. aethiops
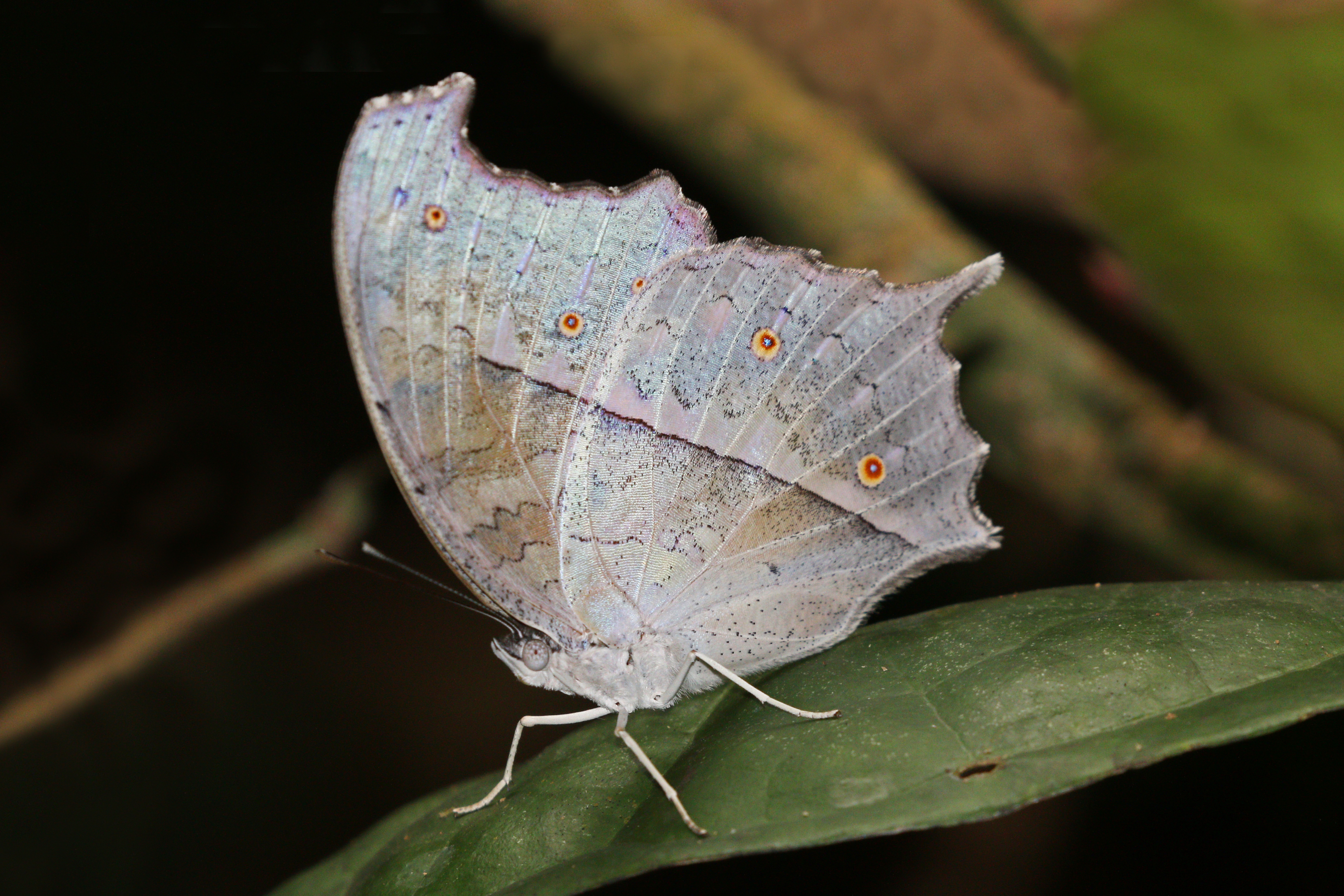
- P. p. parhassus, Ghana

Conservation status
- Least Concern (IUCN 3.1)

Scientific classification
- Kingdom: Animalia
- Phylum: Arthropoda
- Clade: Pancrustacea
- Class: Insecta
- Order: Lepidoptera
- Family: Nymphalidae
- Genus: Protogoniomorpha
- Species: P. parhassus

Binomial name
- Protogoniomorpha parhassus (Drury, 1782)
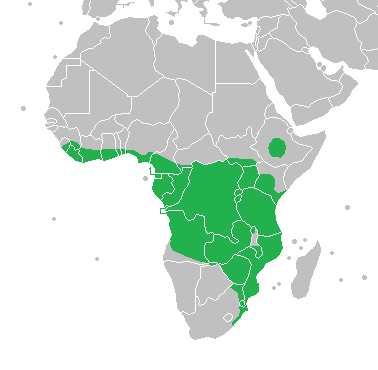
- Approximate range

Synonyms
- Papilio parhassus Drury, 1782; Salamis parhassus; Papilio aethiops Palisot de Beauvais, 1805; Vanessa aglatonice Godart, 1819; Salamis parhassus aethiops f. aest. modestus Overlaet, 1955; Salamis parhassus f. pyricolor Stoneham, 1965

= Protogoniomorpha parhassus =

Forest mother-of-pearl

Species of butterfly

Protogoniomorpha parhassus, the forest mother-of-pearl or common mother-of-pearl, is a species of Nymphalidae butterfly found in forested areas of Africa.

== Subspecies ==
- P. p. parhassus, the forest mother-of-pearl, from Tropical Africa
- P. p. aethiops (Palisot de Beauvais, 1805), the common mother-of-pearl from southern Africa

Torben Larsen developed a species numbering system for his 2005 publication Butterflies of West Africa. The nominate subspecies is #811. The 'Larsen' numbers have since been used with permission in A Sharp Eye on Butterflies of Ghana.

== Description ==
The following description is for P. p. aethiops: A large butterfly; the wingspan is 65–80 mm for males and 75–90 mm for females. The male and female are similar in colour and pattern. The base colour of the upper surface of the wings is greenish white with a violet sheen in the wet-season form, and pearly white in the dry-season form. The forewing has a black-tipped, hooked apex. The wings have a few red eyespots which are ringed with black. There are black spots near the margins of both the forewings and hindwings. The underside of the wings has a greenish-white base colour, with eyespots corresponding to those on the upper surface.

== Life cycle ==
=== Eggs ===
This species lays tiny eggs similar to those of Junonia and Precis species.

=== Larvae ===
The larvae are similar to those of Junonia and Precis species, but larger. They feed on Asystasia (A. gangetica), Brillantaisia, Isoglossa (I. woodii and I. mossambicensis), Mimulopsis, and Paulowilhelmia species.

=== Pupae ===
The pupae are similar to those of Junonia and Precis species, but larger.

=== Adults ===
The flight period of the adults is year round, peaking in summer and autumn. They have a "ponderous, flapping flight which can be quite fast". The males may perch on the leaves of forest trees, while the females stay closer to the ground near the larval food plants. These butterflies roost under leaves at night, and the males sometimes mud-puddle.

== Gallery ==
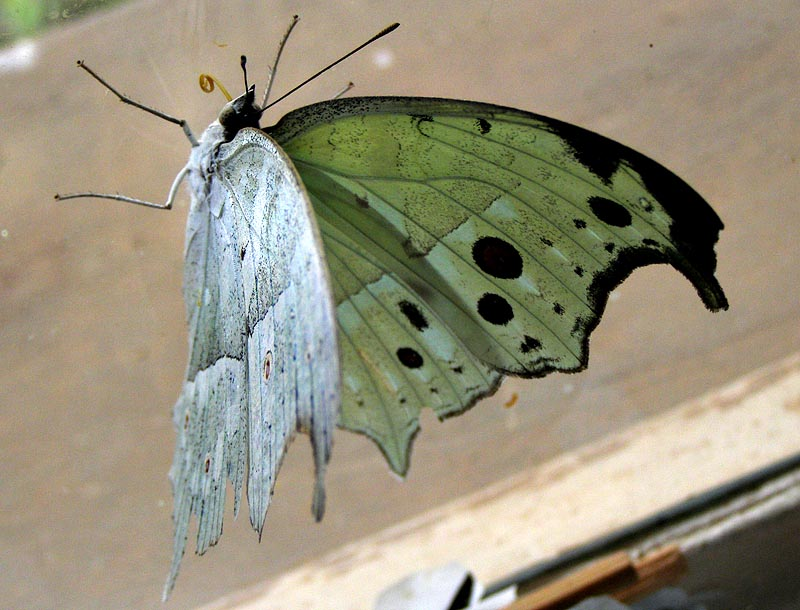
P. p. aethiops in Eswatini

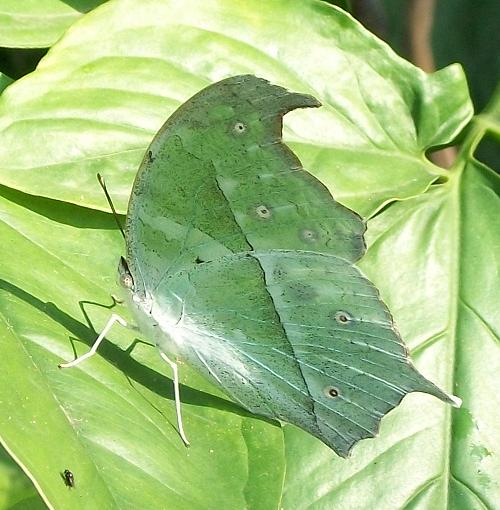
P. p. aethiops in South Africa

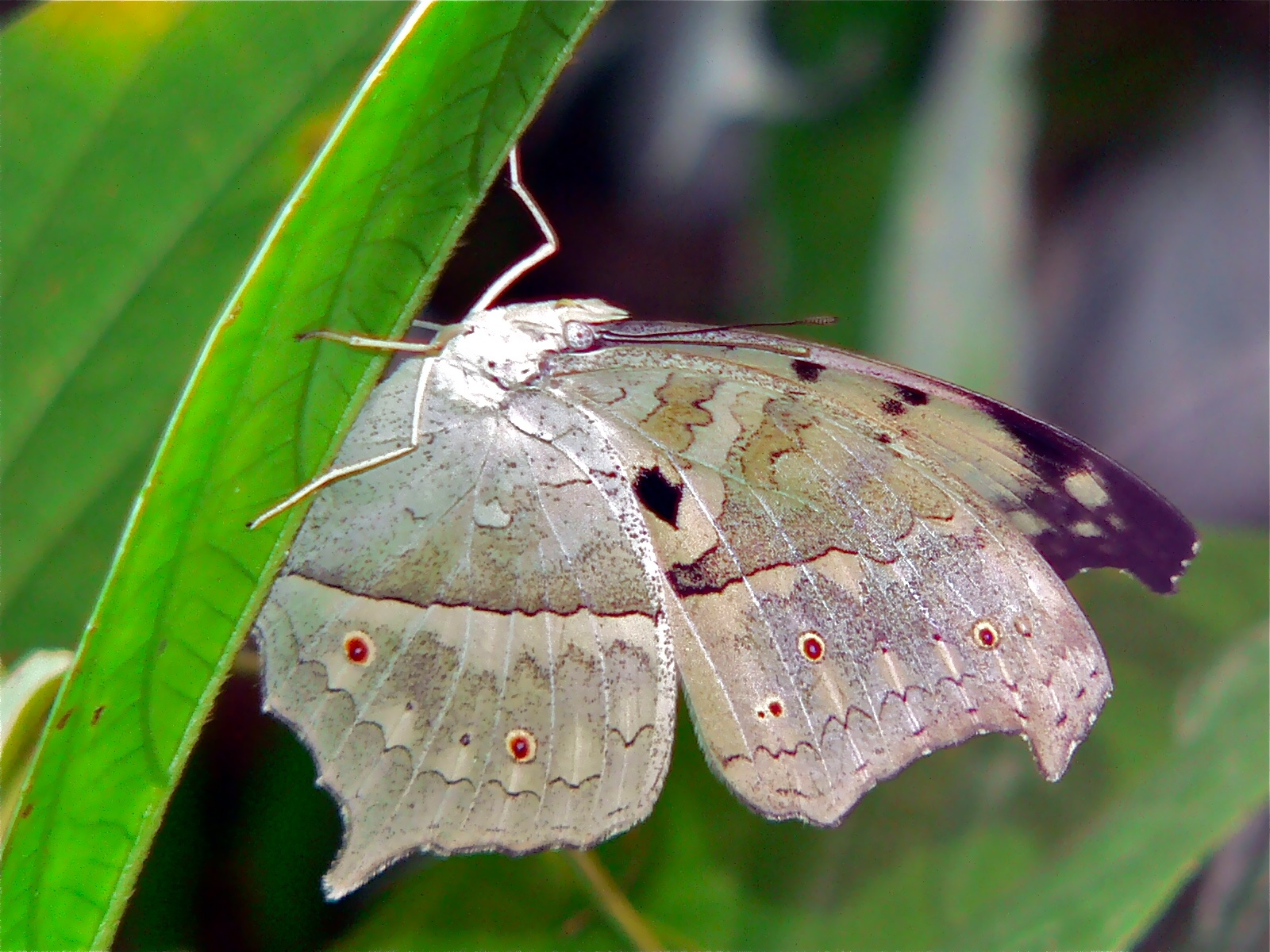
P. p. parhassus, Cameroon
