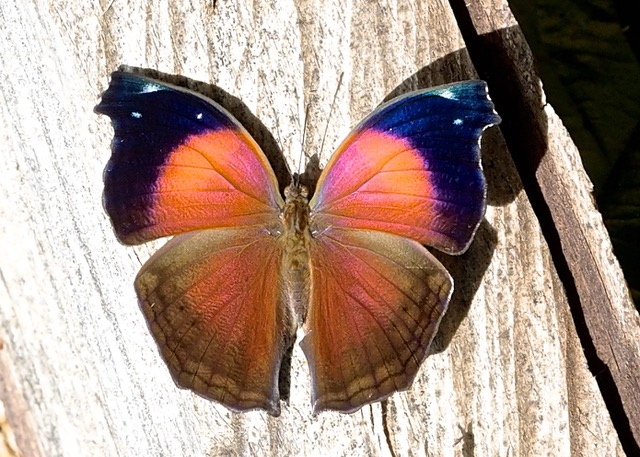
- female, Wli Falls, Ghana
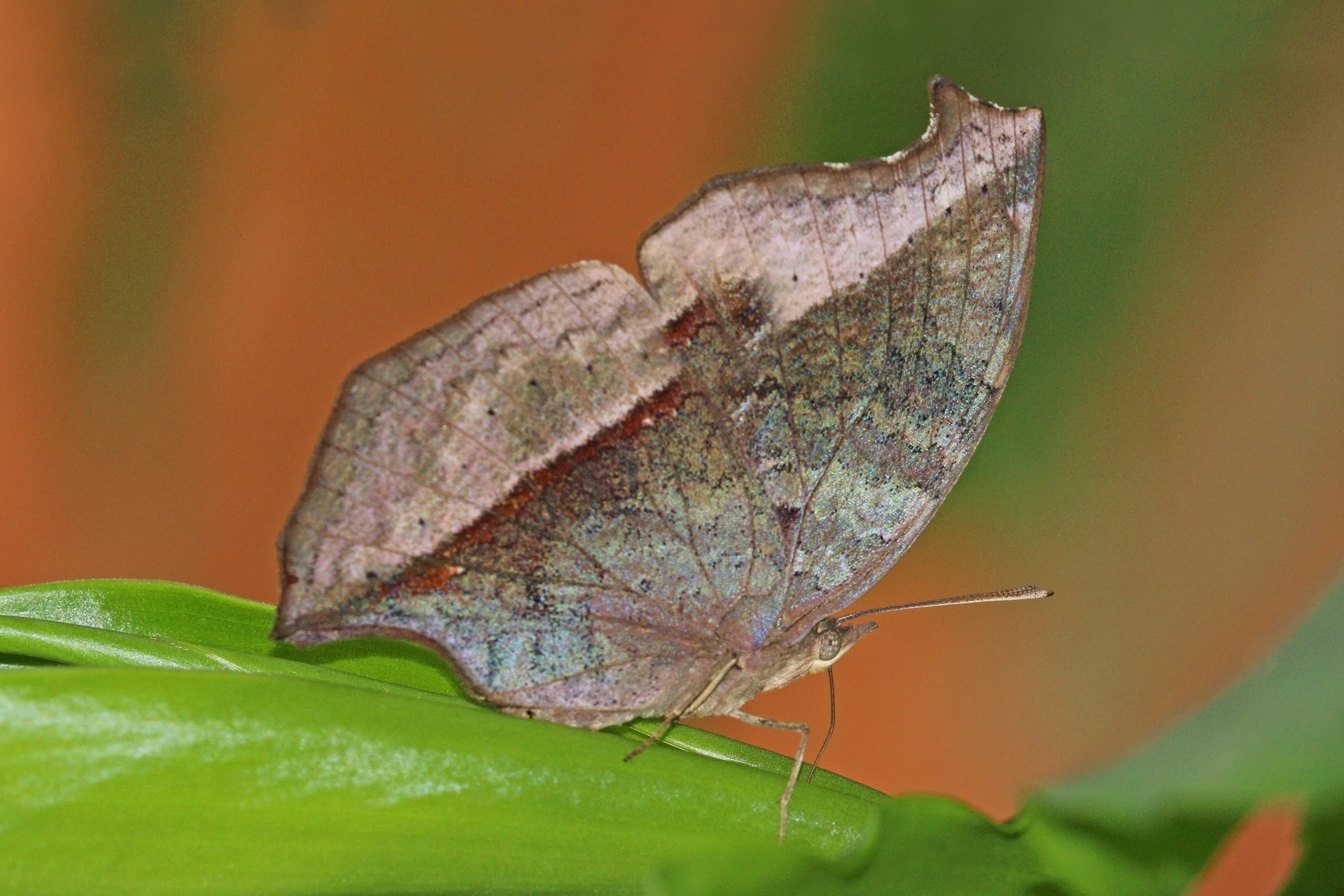
- male, Bobiri Forest, Ghana

Scientific classification
- Kingdom: Animalia
- Phylum: Arthropoda
- Clade: Pancrustacea
- Class: Insecta
- Order: Lepidoptera
- Family: Nymphalidae
- Genus: Salamis
- Species: S. cacta

Binomial name
- Salamis cacta (Fabricius, 1793)

Synonyms
- Papilio cacta Fabricius, 1793; Salamis cacta languida Bartel, 1905; Salamis strandi Röber, 1937

= Salamis cacta =

Lilac mother-of-pearl

Species of butterfly

Salamis cacta, the lilac mother-of-pearl or lilac beauty, is a butterfly in the family Nymphalidae. It is found in Senegal, Guinea, Sierra Leone, Liberia, Ivory Coast, Ghana, Togo, Benin, Nigeria, Cameroon, Equatorial Guinea, Gabon, the Republic of Congo, the Central African Republic, Angola, the Democratic Republic of Congo, Uganda, Rwanda, Ethiopia, Kenya, Tanzania, Malawi, Mozambique and Zimbabwe. The habitat consists of forests, including disturbed forest habitats.

Adults usually fly in the forest canopy, but may descend to suck at damp patches or to settle in the undergrowth. Occasionally, individuals may join migrations of other species. Adults are on wing year round.

The larvae feed on Urera hypselodendron, Urera trinervis, and Urera occidentalis.

== Subspecies ==
- Salamis cacta cacta — south-eastern Senegal, Guinea, Sierra Leone, Liberia, Ivory Coast, Ghana, Togo, Benin, Nigeria, Cameroon, Equatorial Guinea, Gabon, Congo, Central African Republic, Angola, Democratic Republic of Congo, Uganda, Rwanda, Ethiopia, western Kenya, Tanzania
- Salamis cacta amaniensis Vosseler, 1907 — coast of Kenya, north-eastern Tanzania
- Salamis cacta eileenae Henning & Joannou, 1994 — Malawi, west-central Mozambique, eastern Zimbabwe

Torben Larsen developed a species numbering system for his 2005 publication Butterflies of West Africa. The nominate subspecies is #808. The 'Larsen' numbers have since been used with permission in A Sharp Eye on Butterflies of Ghana.
