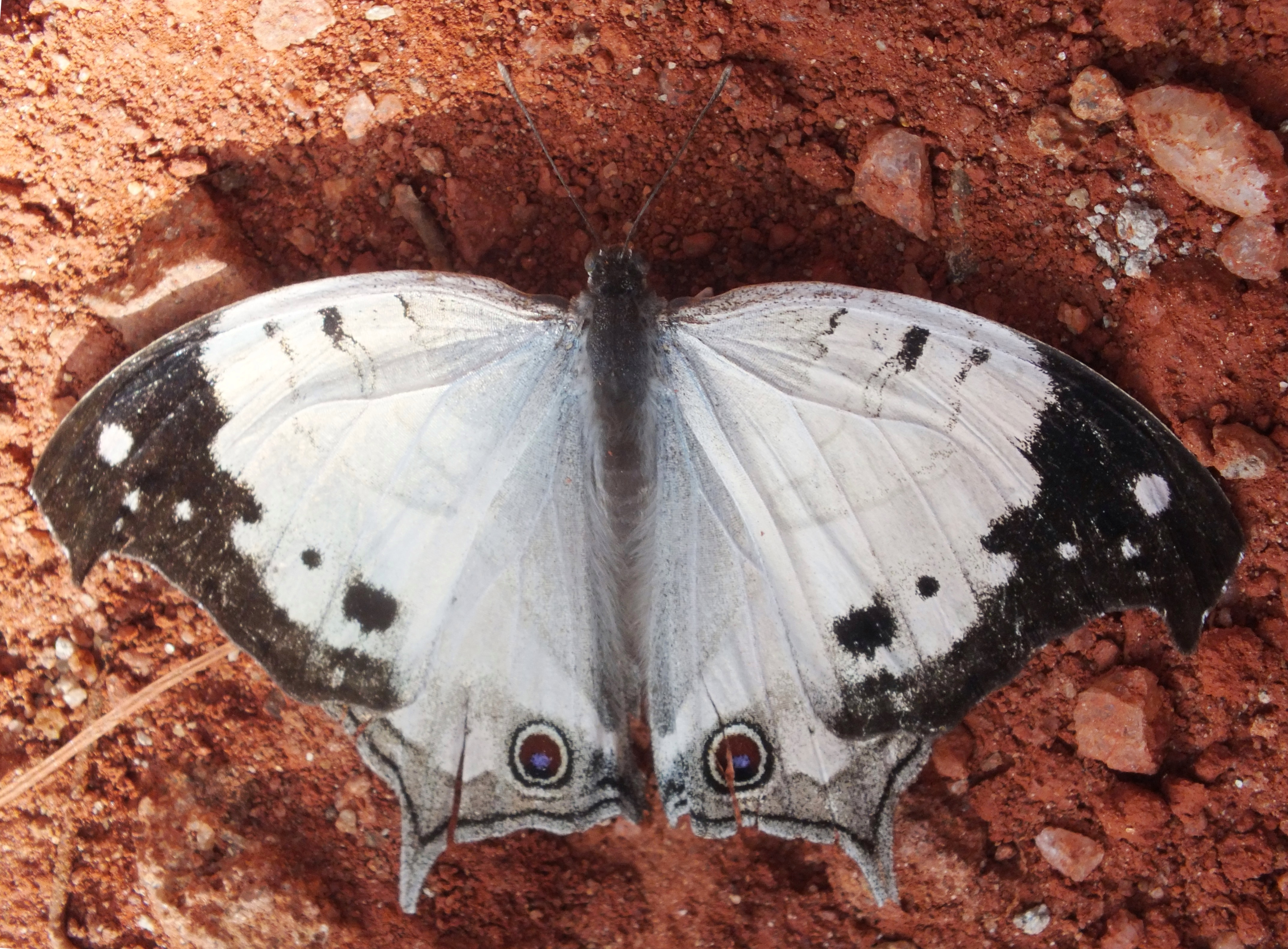
- P. duprei

Conservation status
- Near Threatened (IUCN 3.1)

Scientific classification
- Kingdom: Animalia
- Phylum: Arthropoda
- Clade: Pancrustacea
- Class: Insecta
- Order: Lepidoptera
- Family: Nymphalidae
- Genus: Protogoniomorpha
- Species: P. duprei

Binomial name
- Protogoniomorpha duprei Vinson, 1863

Synonyms
- Salamis duprei

= Malagasy mother-of-pearl butterfly =

Malagasy mother-of-pearl

Species of butterfly

Protogoniomorpha duprei, the Malagasy mother-of-pearl, is a species of butterfly-footed butterfly endemic to the island state of Madagascar.

== Description ==
With a wingspan nearing 7 centimetres, Protogoniomorpha duprei is a medium sized butterfly.

== Threats ==
Being an inhabitant of forests, this uncommon insect is affected by habitat loss due to logging and land conversion for agriculture. This is the leading cause of its population decline. It is estimated that the population has declined by 20–30% within the last decade.
