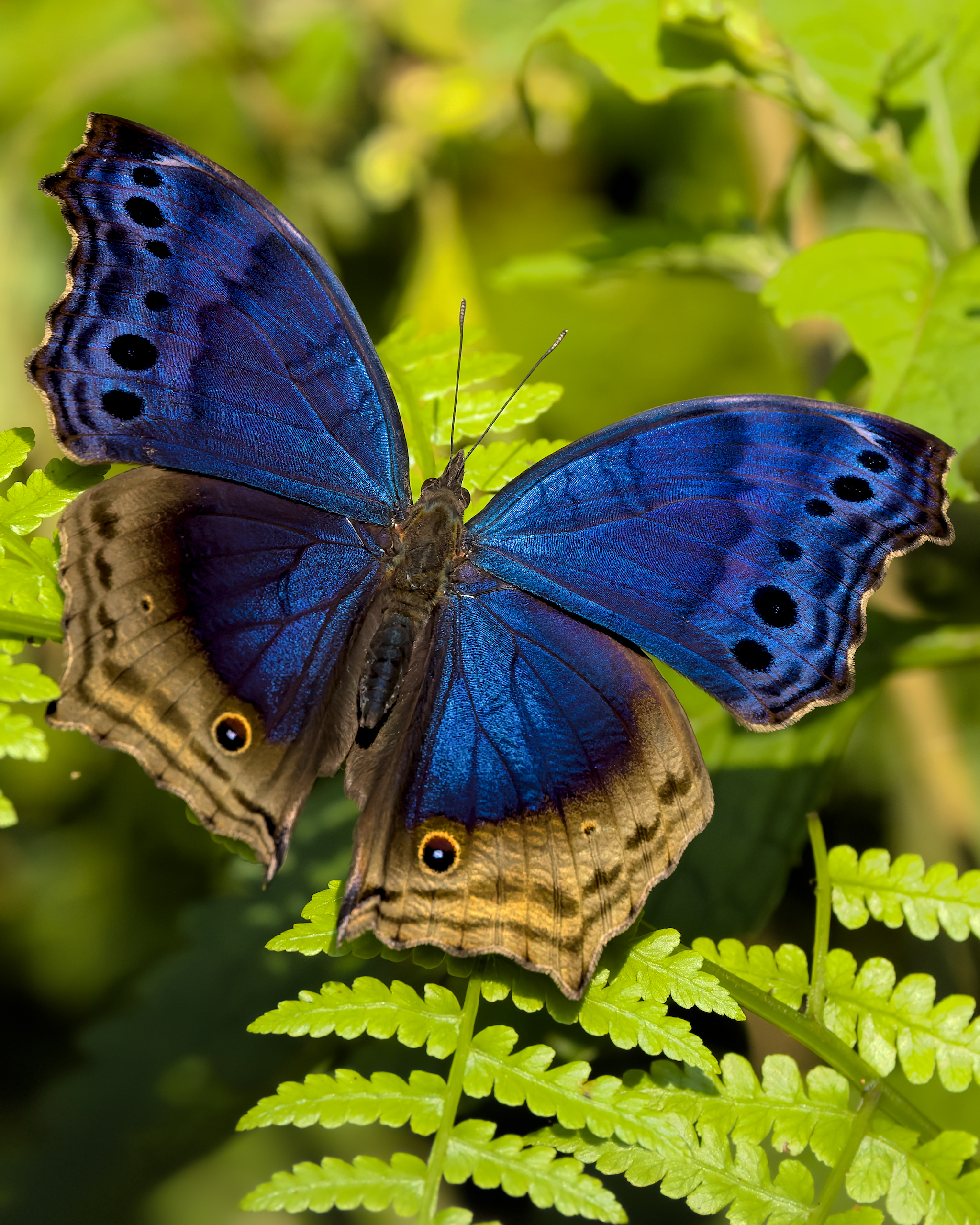

Scientific classification
- Kingdom: Animalia
- Phylum: Arthropoda
- Clade: Pancrustacea
- Class: Insecta
- Order: Lepidoptera
- Family: Nymphalidae
- Genus: Protogoniomorpha
- Species: P. temora

Binomial name
- Protogoniomorpha temora (Felder & Felder, 1867)
- P. t. temora (Felder, 1867) P. t. virescens (Suffert, 1904)

Synonyms
- Salamis temora Felder & Felder, 1867; Junonia temora; Salamis amarantha Butler, 1869; Salamis temora virescens Suffert, 1904; Junonia temora virescens

= Protogoniomorpha temora =

Species of butterfly

Protogoniomorpha temora, the blue mother-of-pearl or eastern blue beauty, is a butterfly in the family Nymphalidae. It is found in Nigeria, Cameroon, the Republic of the Congo, Angola, the Central African Republic, the Democratic Republic of the Congo, Uganda, Tanzania, Kenya, Sudan and Ethiopia. The habitat consists of dense forests and riverine thicket.

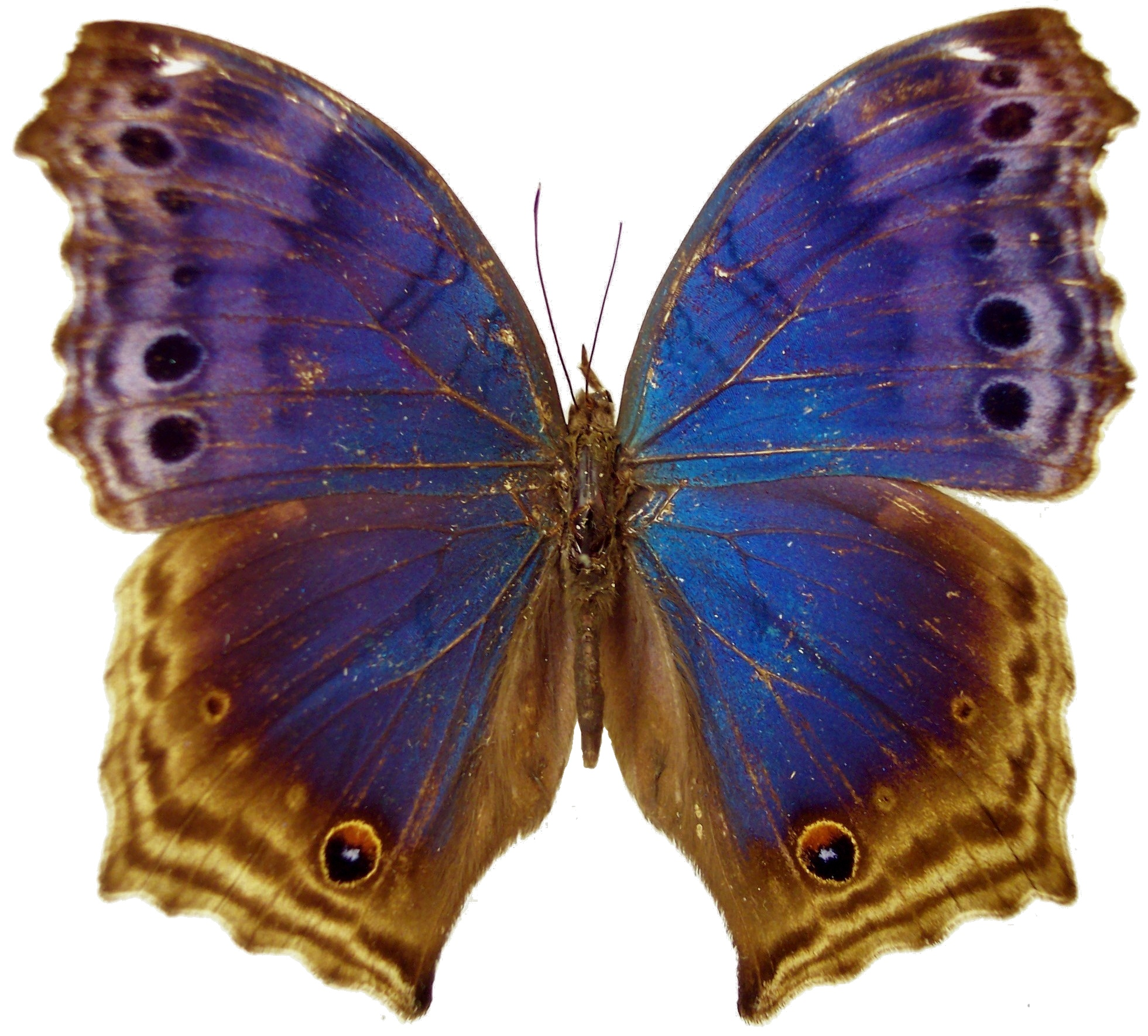

The larvae feed on Paulowilhelmia sclerochiton, Mimulopsis spatulata, Sclerochiton paulowilhelmina, Justicia, Asystasia and Mellera species.

== Subspecies ==
- Protogoniomorpha temora temora (Nigeria, Cameroon, Congo, Angola, Central African Republic, Democratic Republic of the Congo, Uganda, western Tanzania, western Kenya, southern Sudan, Ethiopia)
- Protogoniomorpha temora virescens (Suffert, 1904) (Tanzania: east to the Nguru and Uluguru Mountains)
