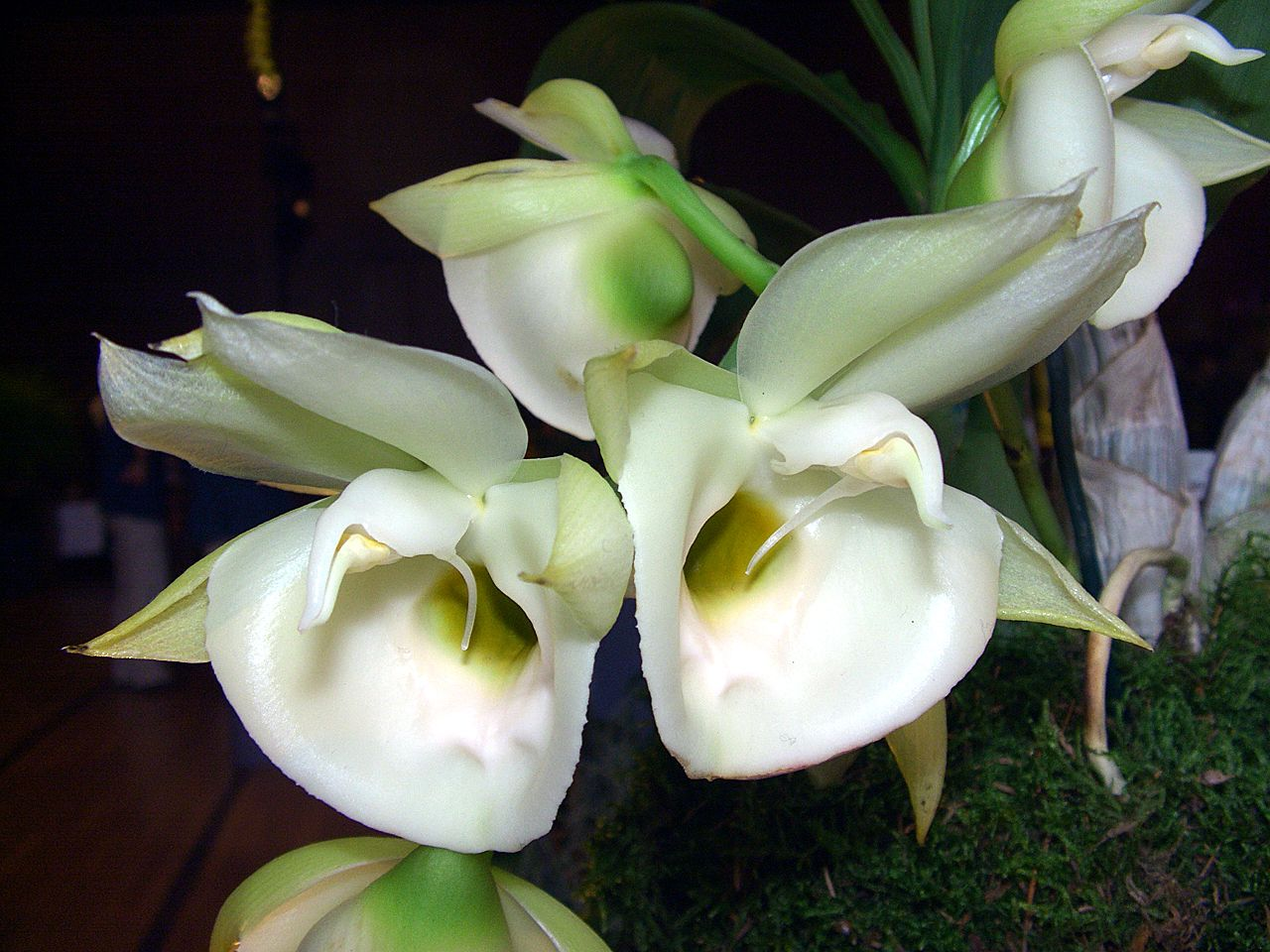

Scientific classification
- Kingdom: Plantae
- Clade: Tracheophytes
- Clade: Angiosperms
- Clade: Monocots
- Order: Asparagales
- Family: Orchidaceae
- Subfamily: Epidendroideae
- Genus: Catasetum
- Species: C. pileatum

Binomial name
- Catasetum pileatum Rchb.f.

Synonyms
- Catasetum bungerothii N.E. Br.; Catasetum bungerothii var. pottsianum L. Linden & Rodigas; Catasetum bungerothii var. album Linden & Rodigas; Catasetum bungerothii var. randii Rodigas; Catasetum bungerothii var. aurantiacum Cogn.; Catasetum bungerothii var. lindenii Gower; Catasetum bungerothii var. regale Gower; Catasetum imperiale L.Linden & Cogn.; Catasetum × splendens var. imperiale (Linden & Cogn.) Rolfe; Catasetum bungerothii var. imperiale (L. Linden & Cogn.) Cogn.; Catasetum pileatum var. album (Linden & Rodigas) Hoehne; Catasetum pileatum var. imperiale (L. Linden & Cogn.) Cogn. ex Hoehne; Catasetum pileatum var. lindenii (Gower) Hoehne; Catasetum pileatum var. regale (Gower) Hoehne

= Catasetum pileatum =

Species of orchid

Catasetum pileatum, the felt-capped catasetum or mother of pearl flower, is a species of orchid found from Trinidad to Ecuador.

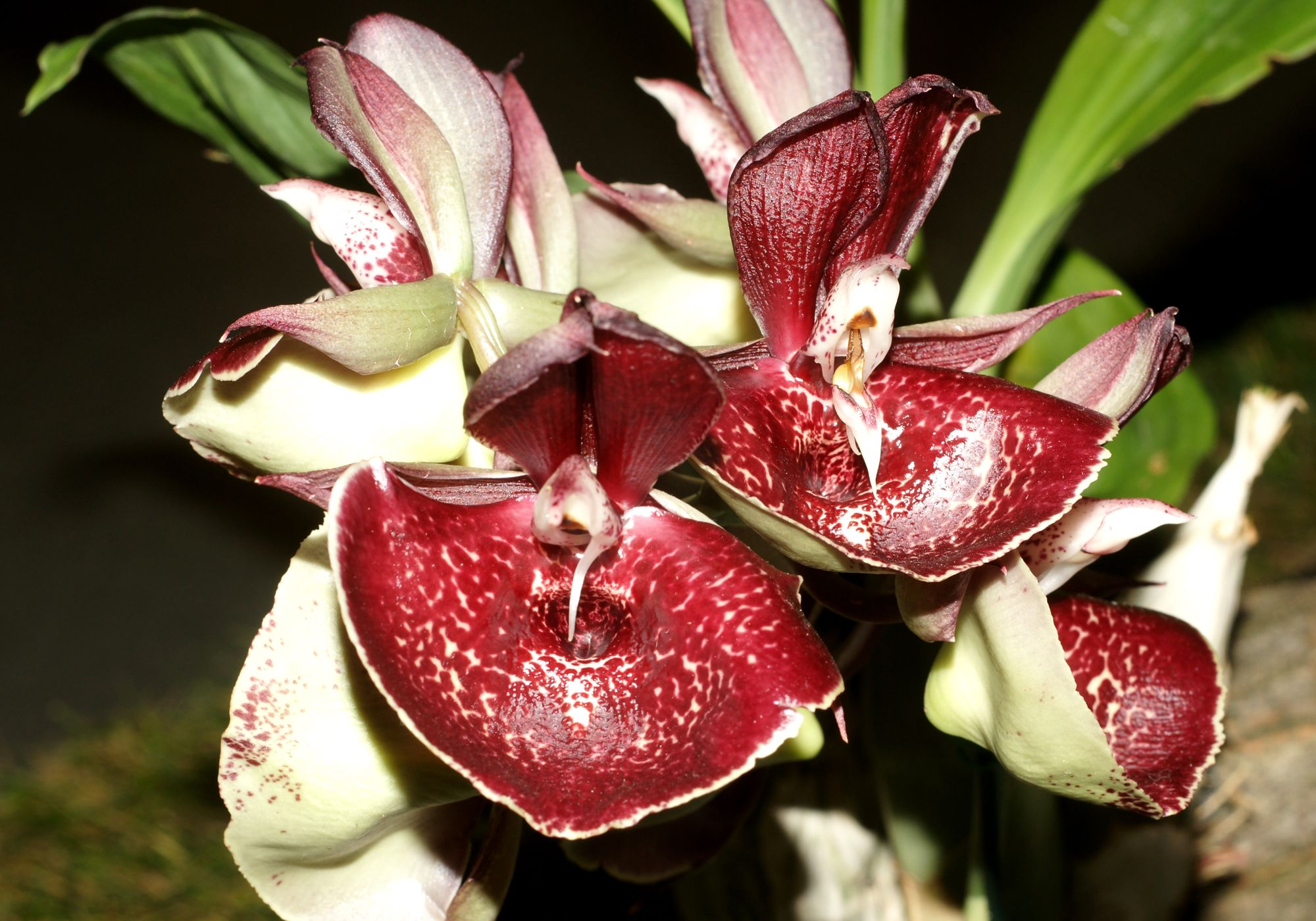

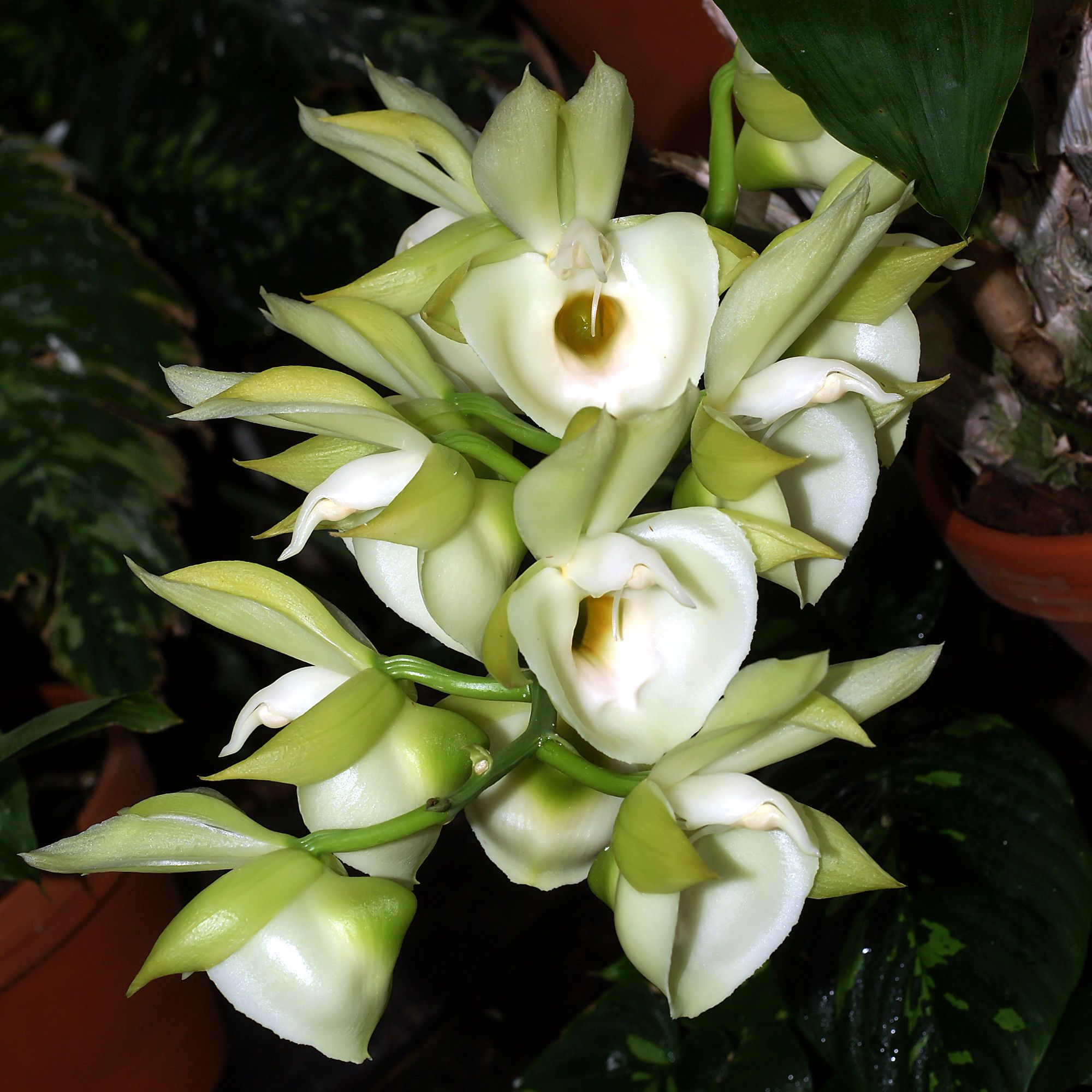

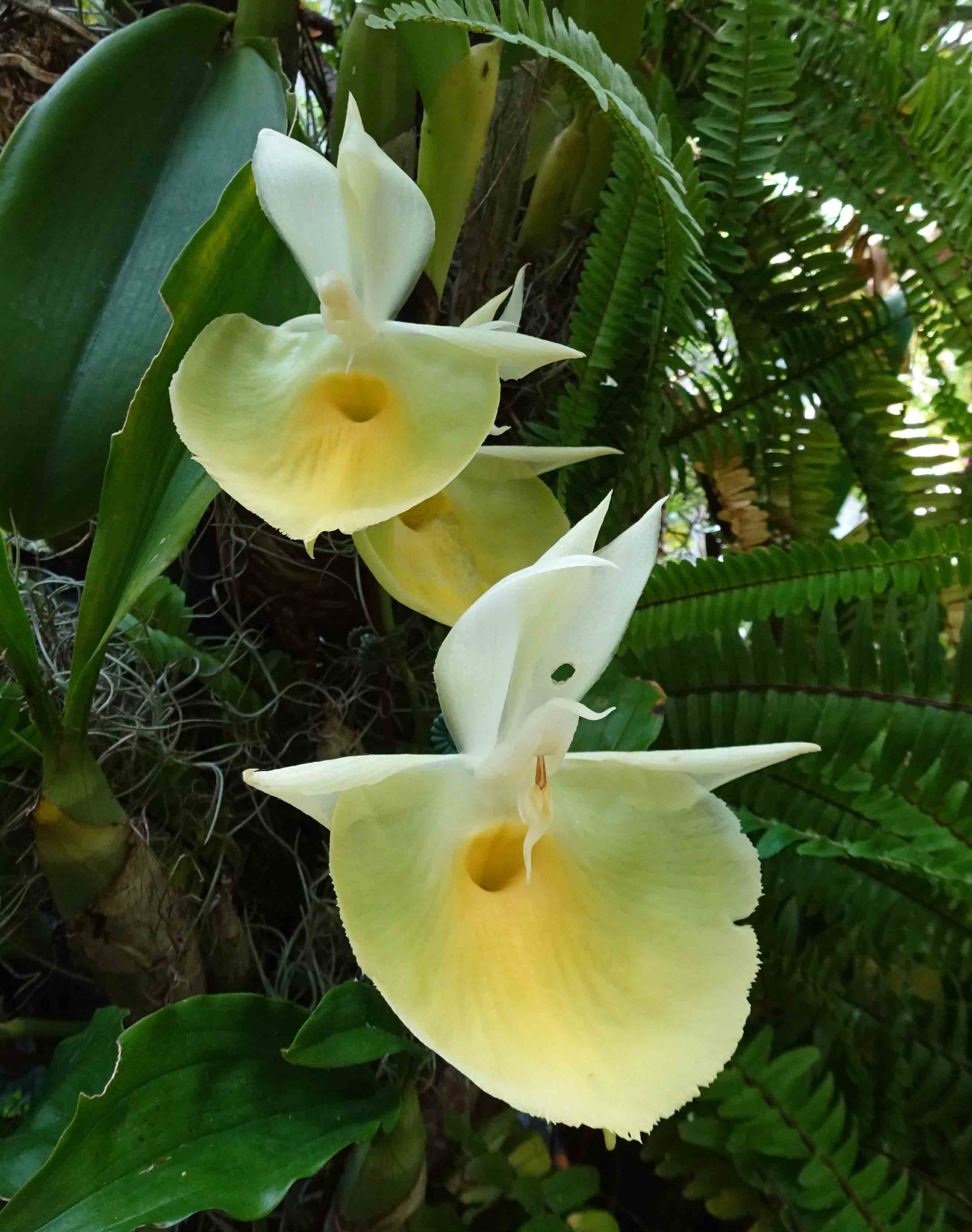
