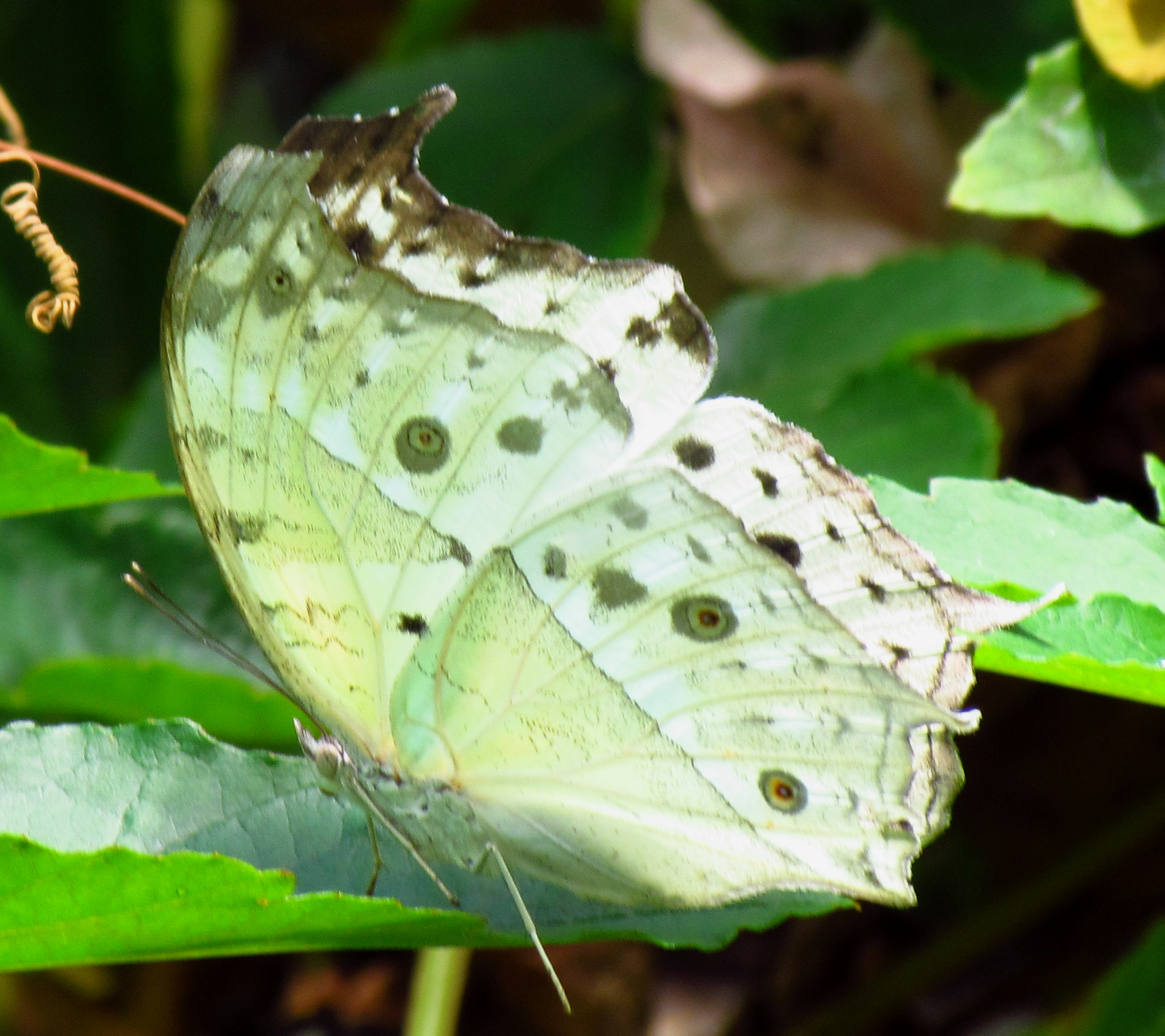
- Forest mother-of-pearl, P. parhassus

Scientific classification
- Domain: Eukaryota
- Kingdom: Animalia
- Phylum: Arthropoda
- Class: Insecta
- Order: Lepidoptera
- Family: Nymphalidae
- Genus: Protogoniomorpha; Wallengren, 1857

Species
- See text
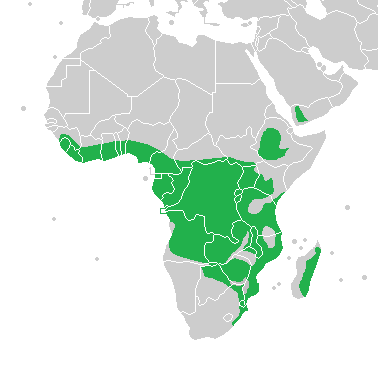
- Approximate range of genus

= Protogoniomorpha =

Mother-of-pearls

Genus of butterflies

Protogoniomorpha is a genus of nymphalid butterflies found in the Afrotropical realm, commonly known as mother-of-pearls.

== Taxonomy ==
Protogoniomorpha was viewed as part of Salamis by Ackery et al. (1995). Based on phylogenetic research, the group was reinstated as distinct genus, with some members possibly needing further reassignment.

== Species ==
- Protogoniomorpha anacardii (Linnaeus, 1758) — clouded mother-of-pearl
- Protogoniomorpha cytora (Doubleday, 1847) — western blue beauty
- Protogoniomorpha duprei Vinson, 1863 — Madagascan mother-of-pearl (sometimes listed as a subspecies of P. anacardii)
- Protogoniomorpha parhassus (Druce, 1782) — common mother-of-pearl or forest mother-of-pearl
- Protogoniomorpha temora Felder, 1867 — blue mother-of-pearl
