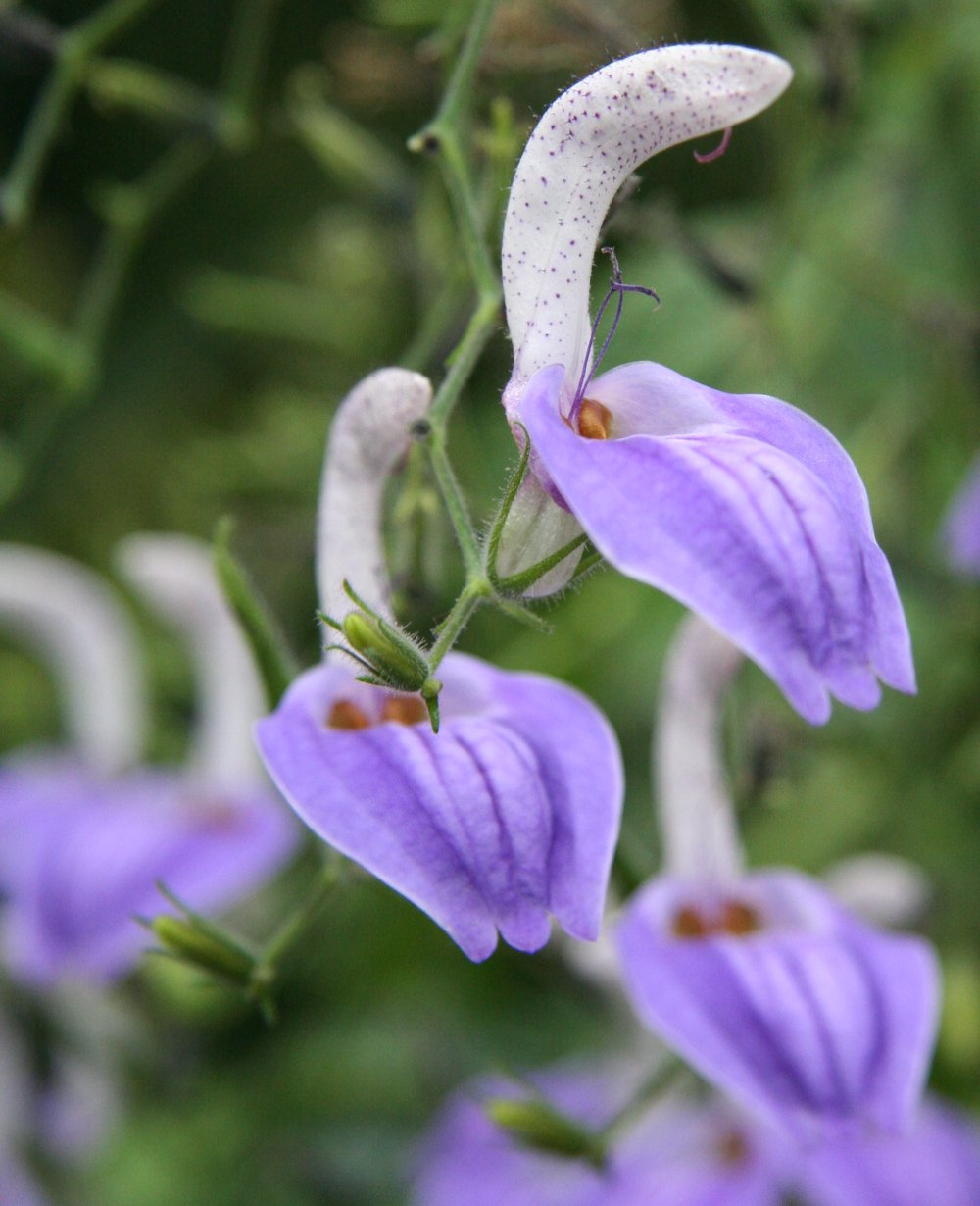
- Brillantaisia owariensis

Scientific classification
- Kingdom: Plantae
- Clade: Tracheophytes
- Clade: Angiosperms
- Clade: Eudicots
- Clade: Asterids
- Order: Lamiales
- Family: Acanthaceae
- Subfamily: Acanthoideae
- Tribe: Ruellieae
- Genus: Brillantaisia; P.Beauv. (1818)

Synonyms
- Belantheria Nees (1847); Leucorhaphis Nees (1847); Ruelliola Baill. (1890)

= Brillantaisia =

Genus of flowering plants

Brillantaisia is a genus of plants in the family Acanthaceae. They are native to the African tropics and subtropics, including Madagascar. They may grow from 20 cm to 2 m in height. Their hirsute stems are square in cross-section and their heart-shaped leaves have an opposite arrangement. Their purple or white pea-like flowers produce long, cigar-shaped seed pods. They reproduce easily from seeds or vegetatively. One species, B. lamium, is invasive in Queensland.

== Species ==
14 species are accepted.

- Brillantaisia cicatricosa Lindau
- Brillantaisia debilis Burkill
- Brillantaisia fulva Lindau
- Brillantaisia grottanellii Pic.Serm.
- Brillantaisia lamium (Nees) Benth.
- Brillantaisia lancifolia Lindau
- Brillantaisia madagascariensis T.Anderson ex Lindau
- Brillantaisia oligantha Milne-Redh.
- Brillantaisia owariensis P.Beauv.
- Brillantaisia pubescens T.Anderson ex Oliv.
- Brillantaisia richardsiae Vollesen
- Brillantaisia riparia (Vollesen & Brummitt) Sidwell
- Brillantaisia stenopteris Sidwell
- Brillantaisia vogeliana Benth.
