= KwaZulu-Natal Dune Forest =

Subtropical forest type from the coastal dunes of KwaZulu-Natal, South Africa

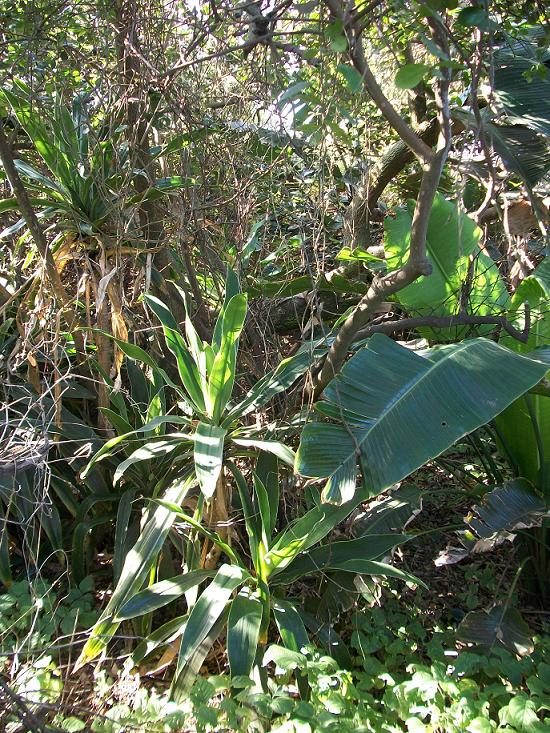
Dune Forest at Pipeline Coastal Park

KwaZulu-Natal Dune Forest is a subtropical forest type that was once found almost continuously along the coastal dunes of KwaZulu-Natal, South Africa. This vegetation type develops in sheltered areas behind the littoral zone, where with some protection from the salt wind it may develop with canopies as tall as 30 m. It still exists in protected areas, but much has been degraded by human activity. Coastal dune forest covers approximately 1% of the land area of KwaZulu-Natal, and is a habitat type seriously threatened from human population pressure and development, particularly titanium mining.

== List of trees (incomplete) ==
- Allophylus natalensis – Dune false currant
- Deinbollia oblongifolia – Dune soap-berry
- Dracaena aletriformis – Large-leaved dragon tree
- Euclea natalensis – Natal guarri
- Ficus burtt-davyi – Veld fig
- Mimusops afra – Coastal red milkwood
- Sideroxylon inerme – White milkwood
- Strelitzia nicolai – Natal wild banana

== Birds ==
The coastal dune forest is one of the main habitats of the spotted ground-thrush, which is threatened by the decline of these forests.

== Invertebrates ==
During 1995, spiders were sampled from the herbaceous layer of coastal dune forests at Richards Bay, KwaZulu-Natal. Four stands were sampled in rehabilitating dune forest and one stand in a mature forest. Samples were taken for a two-month period and a total of 2955 spiders representing 23 families, 72 genera and 96 species were recorded.

== See also ==
- Forests of KwaZulu-Natal

== Bibliography ==
- Pooley, E. (1993). The Complete Field Guide to Trees of Natal, Zululand and Transkei. ISBN 0-620-17697-0.
- Pooley, E. (1998). A Field Guide to Wild Flowers; KwaZulu-Natal and the Eastern Region. ISBN 0-620-21500-3.
- Pooley, T. and Player, I. (1995). KwaZulu-Natal Wildlife Destinations. ISBN 1-86812-487-8.
