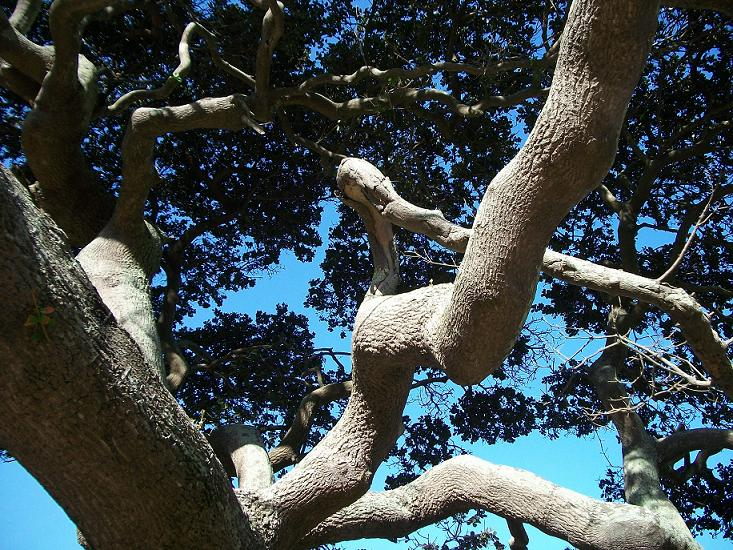
- Branches and foliage of a large M. afra

Conservation status
- Least Concern (IUCN 3.1)

Scientific classification
- Kingdom: Plantae
- Clade: Tracheophytes
- Clade: Angiosperms
- Clade: Eudicots
- Clade: Asterids
- Order: Ericales
- Family: Sapotaceae
- Genus: Mimusops
- Species: M. afra

Binomial name
- Mimusops afra E.Mey. ex A.DC.

Synonyms
- Kaukenia afra (E.Mey. ex A.DC.) Kuntze; Mimusops revoluta Baill.; Mimusops revoluta Hochst.; Mimusops caffra

= Mimusops afra =

Species of tree

Mimusops afra (coastal red milkwood, Afrikaans: Kusrooimelkhout, Xhosa: Umthunzi, Sepedi: Mmupudu, Zulu: Umkhakhayi) is a species of tree in family Sapotaceae. This tree is found in coastal dune vegetation in Southern Africa from the Eastern Cape, through KwaZulu-Natal to southern Mozambique.

== Description ==
Mimusops afra is a small to medium-sized tree. The stem is up to 50 cm (20 in) in diameter, often gnarled or twisted with dark grey bark which is wrinkled longitudinally. These trees may reach 15–25 m (49–82 ft) in height, but are shorter on the seaward side of the dunes where they rarely exceed 5m tall and where the foliage suffers under salt spray and sea winds. It may be dominant in sheltered dune forest behind the littoral zone, where it can reach 20 m (66 ft) in height with some protection from the salt wind where forests develop with canopies as tall as 30 m (98 ft).

The leaves are alternate, hard and leathery with rounded or blunt tips. Older leaves are blue-green above and paler on the underside. Young leaves are light green.

The creamy-white star-like flowers are 10–20 mm (0.39–0.79 in) in diameter and found in small bunches in the leaf axils.

The fruits are about 15–20 mm (0.59–0.79 in) long and are fat, roundish to oval, red or orange-red when ripe, with a sweet starchy pulp and containing a single oval, shiny brown or blackish seed.

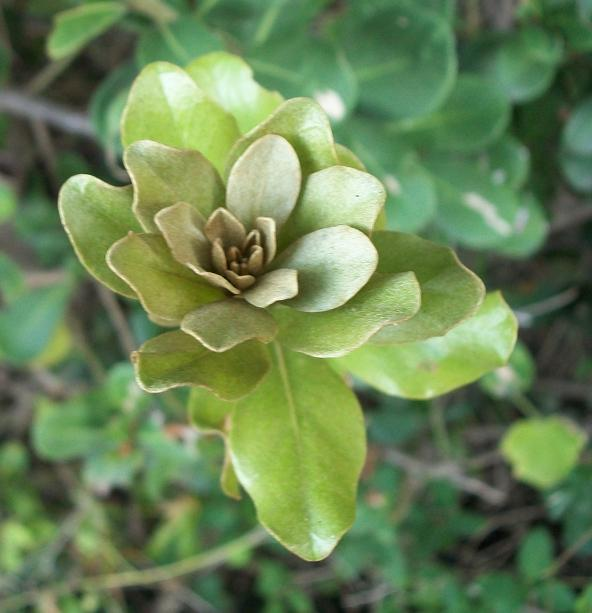
New leaves of Mimusops afra.

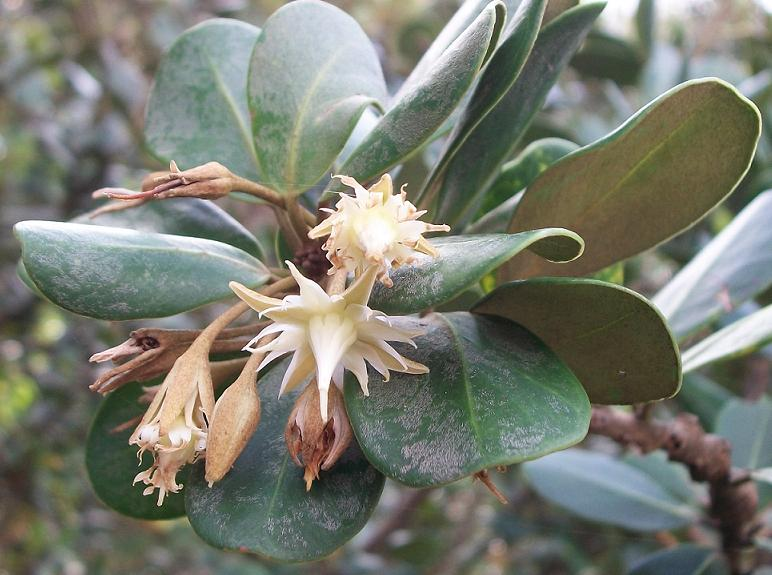
Flowers.

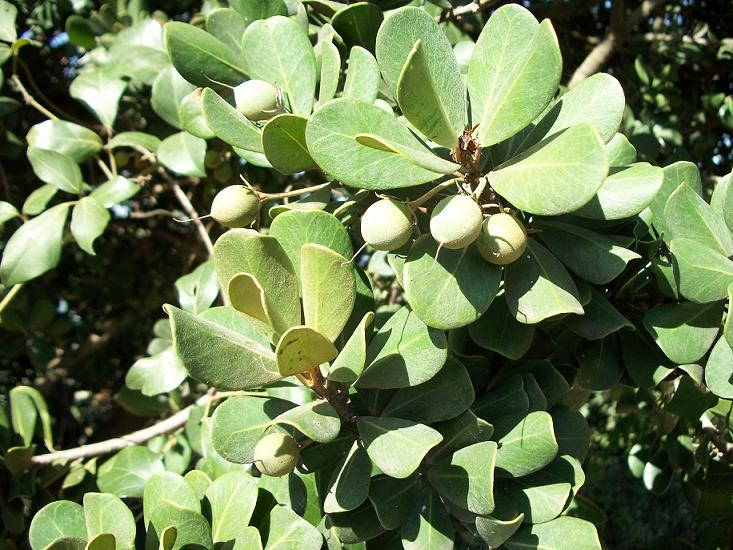
Green fruit and foliage.

== Ecological significance ==
The fruit are eaten by people, vervet monkeys, bushpigs, Cape parrots, black-bellied glossy starlings and yellow-streaked bulbuls. These trees serve to lift the vegetative canopy in coastal dune vegetation, thereby allowing space and protection for more delicate plant species such as Isoglossa woodii (which is fed on by blue duiker) and the large-leaved dragon tree (Dracaena aletriformis). The robust structure of these trees also allows support for climbing plants such as Rhoicissus rhomboidea. Monkeys and birds spread the seeds of Mimusops afra, which are also buoyant and often wash up along the shore.

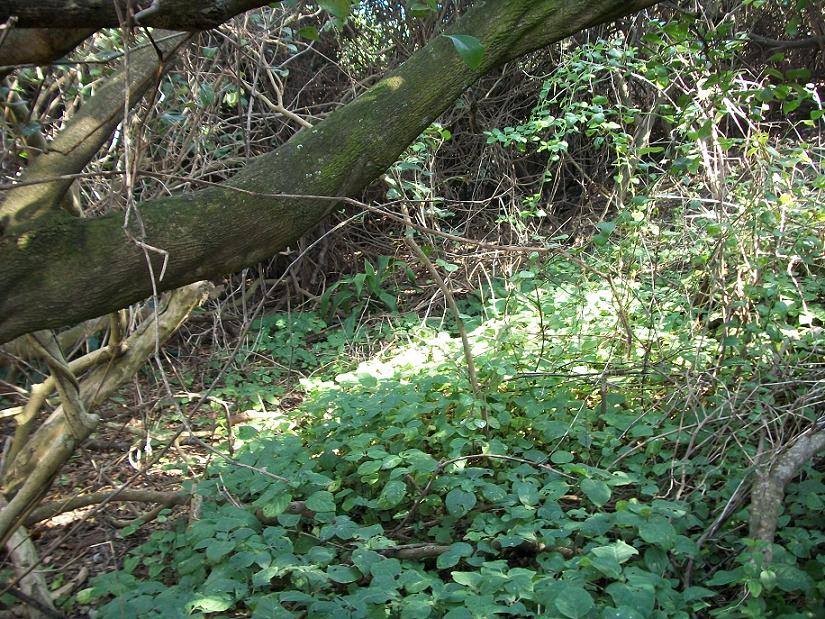
Isoglossa woodii and a young Dracaena aletriformis in the shelter of a Mimusops afra.

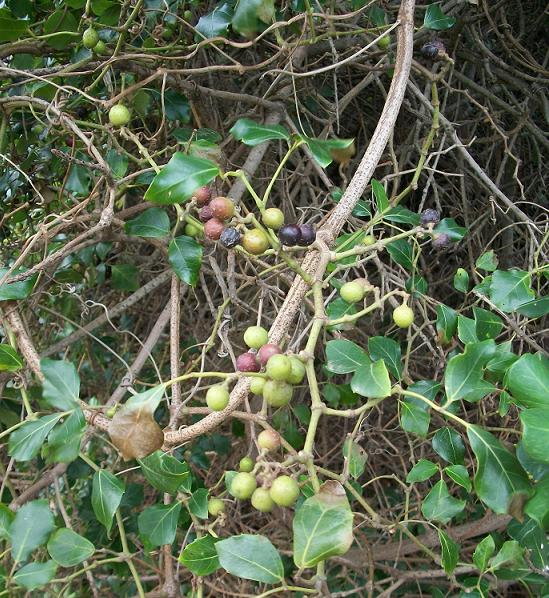
Rhoicissus rhomboidea supported by Mimusops afra.

== Conservation status ==
Mimusops afra is protected (in South Africa) in terms of the National Forest Act of 1998. Protected tree species may not be cut, disturbed, damaged or destroyed, and their products may not be possessed, collected, removed, transported, exported, donated, purchased or sold, except under licence granted by the Department of Forestry or a delegated authority.

== Taxonomy ==
The etymology of the original species name caffra is related to kaffir, an ethnic slur used towards black people in Africa. At the July 2024 International Botanical Congress, a vote was held with the result that "caffra" related names will be emended to afra related ones, with the implementation of this being done at the end of July 2024.
