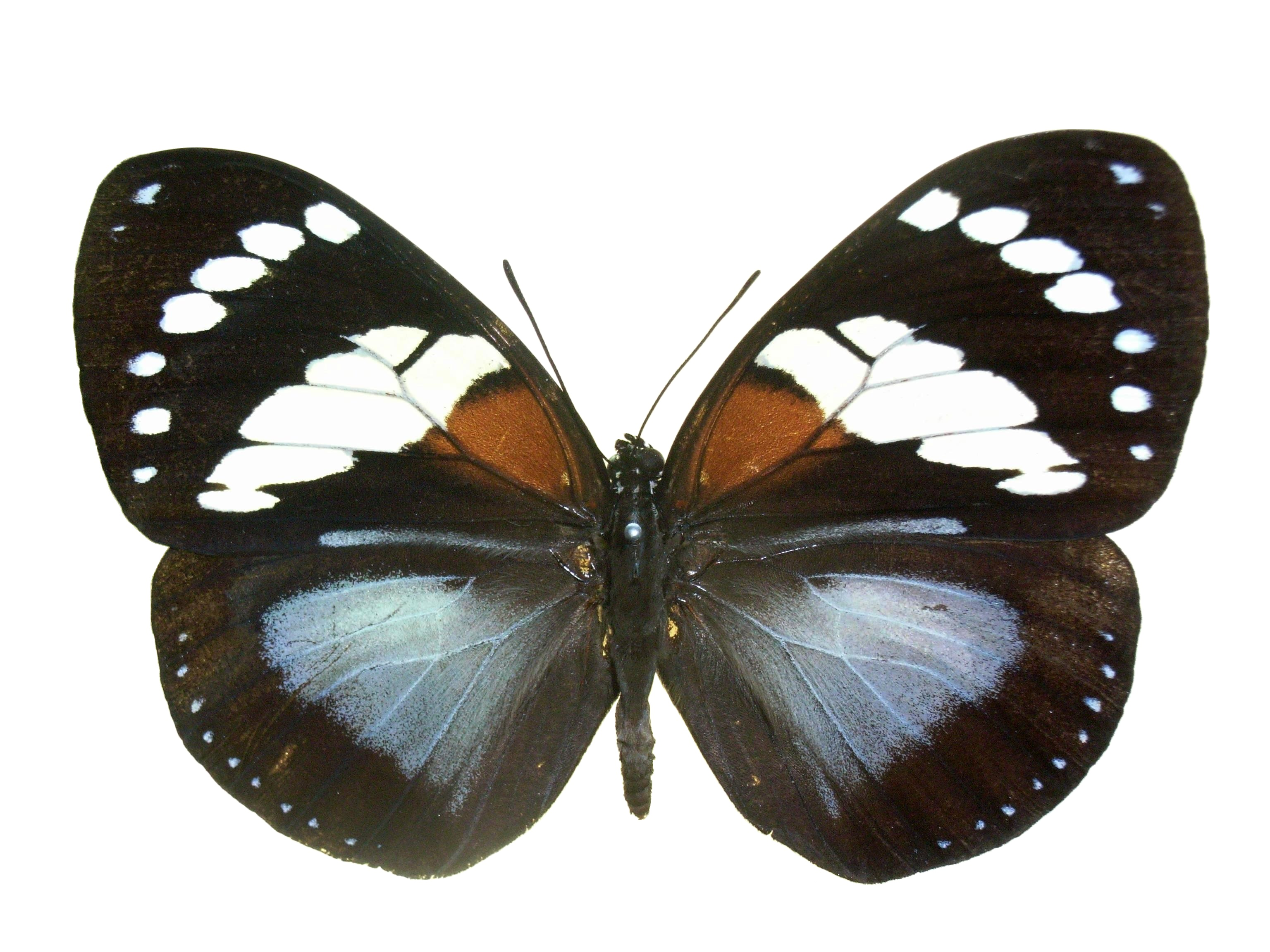

Scientific classification
- Domain: Eukaryota
- Kingdom: Animalia
- Phylum: Arthropoda
- Class: Insecta
- Order: Lepidoptera
- Family: Nymphalidae
- Genus: Euxanthe
- Species: E. trajanus

Binomial name
- Euxanthe trajanus (Ward, 1871)

Synonyms
- Godartia trajanus Ward, 1871; Euxanthe (Hypomelaena) trajanus; Charaxes trajanus; Euxanthe schatzi Staudinger, 1885; Euxanthe trajanus gabonicus Le Cerf, 1923; Euxanthe trajanus f. depuncta Le Cerf, 1923; Euxanthe (Hypomelaena) trajanus nigeriae van Someren, 1975

= Euxanthe trajanus =

Species of butterfly

Euxanthe trajanus, the Trajan's forest queen, is a butterfly in the family Nymphalidae. It is found in Nigeria, Cameroon, Equatorial Guinea, Gabon, the Republic of the Congo, Angola, the Democratic Republic of the Congo, the Central African Republic and Uganda.

== Description ==
E. trajanus Ward (29 f). Ground-colour of both wings black; the forewing in the above and beneath with a yellow-brown basal spot, a light yellow transverse band across the middle, a curved row of seven submarginal spots, of which the anterior ones are larger, and two or three small white spots before the apex; the hindwing above is bluish white in the middle and has small white dots close to the distal margin; beneath it is black with deep black rays between the veins and narrowly red-brown at the base. The female has white markings and the basal part of the hindwing on both surfaces is white to far beyond the middle and from the inner margin to vein 7; the black marginal band is consequently much narrower than in the but encloses two rows of white spots. - In West Africa from the Niger to Angola.

== Subspecies ==
- Euxanthe trajanus trajanus (Nigeria, Cameroon, Equatorial Guinea, Gabon, Congo, Angola, southern and north-eastern Democratic Republic of the Congo, Central African Republic)
- Euxanthe trajanus antonius Rousseau-Decelle, 1938 (southern Democratic Republic of the Congo)
- Euxanthe trajanus vansomereni Poulton, 1929 (eastern Democratic Republic of the Congo, Uganda)

== Biology ==
The habitat consists of primary lowland evergreen forests.

The larvae feed on Deinbollia, Phialodiscus and Lovoa species.
