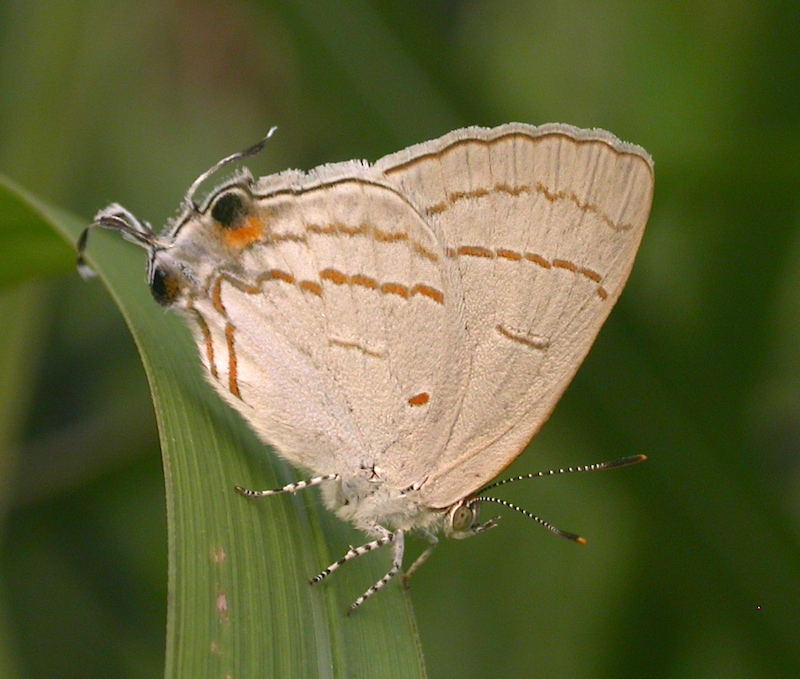

Scientific classification
- Kingdom: Animalia
- Phylum: Arthropoda
- Clade: Pancrustacea
- Class: Insecta
- Order: Lepidoptera
- Family: Lycaenidae
- Genus: Hypolycaena
- Species: H. philippus

Binomial name
- Hypolycaena philippus (Fabricius, 1793)

Synonyms
- Hesperia philippus Fabricius, 1793; Cupido ramonza Saalmüller, 1878; Jolaus orejus Hopffer, 1855; Amblypodia erylus Trimen, 1866; Hypolycaena vittigera Mabille, 1879

= Hypolycaena philippus =

Species of butterfly

Hypolycaena philippus, the purple-brown hairstreak or common hairstreak, is a butterfly of the family Lycaenidae. It is native to sub-Saharan Africa where it is commonly found in wooded locations.

== Description ==
The wingspan is 22–28 mm for males and 23.5–31 mm for females. Adults are on wing year round in warmer areas with peaks in November and March or April.

== Habitat and behavior ==
The larvae feed on Clerodendrum glabrum, Ximenia species (including X. afra and X. americana), Deinbollia species (including D. oblongifolia), Vangueria species (including the inside of fruits of V. randii), Maytenus senegalensis, Allophylus, Loranthus, Punica granatum, other Clerodendrum, Coccinia grandis and Ixora.

== Subspecies ==
- Hypolycaena philippus philippus – mainland sub-Saharan Africa
- Hypolycaena philippus ramonza (Saalmüller, 1878) – Madagascar, Aldabra, Cosmoledo, Comoro Islands
