= Pipeline Coastal Park =

Nature reserve in Amanzimtoti, Durban, South Africa

Coordinates: 30°01′59″S 30°54′26″E

The Pipeline Coastal Park is an area of coastal vegetation in Amanzimtoti, Durban, South Africa. It is an elongated strip of land bordering the Indian Ocean. Plants found here include the Mimusops afra, Strelitzia nicolai and Brachylaena discolor.

== Gallery ==
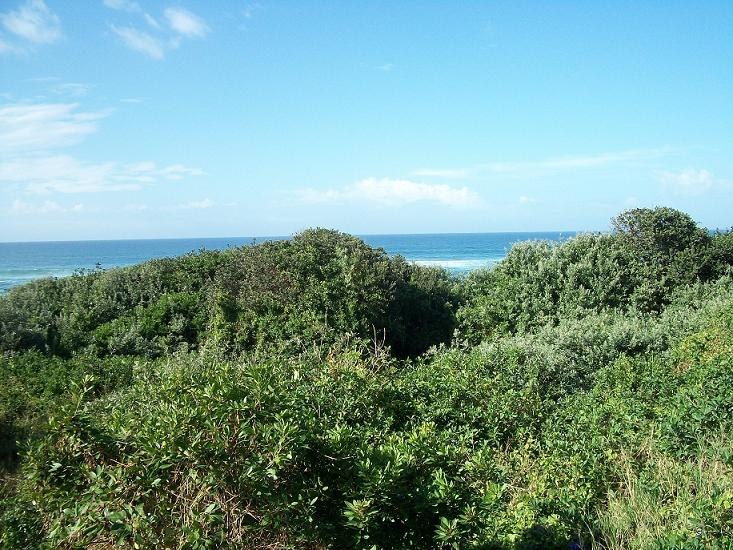
Dune vegetation in the Pipeline Coastal Park.

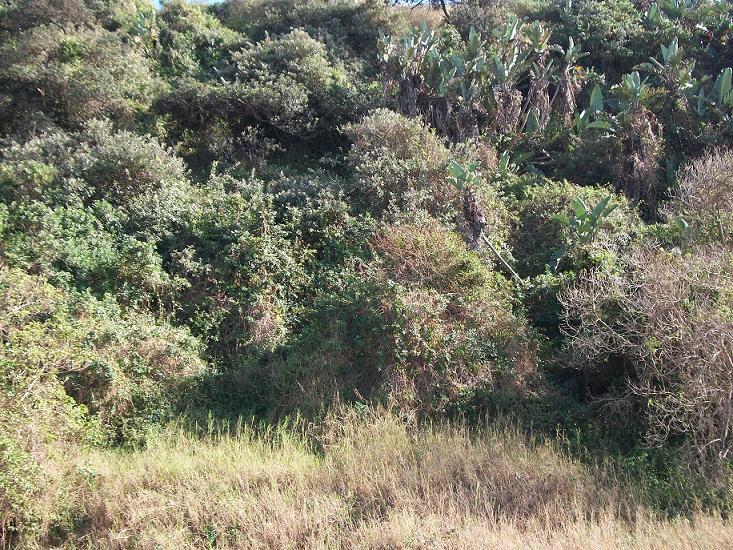
Coastal vegetation.

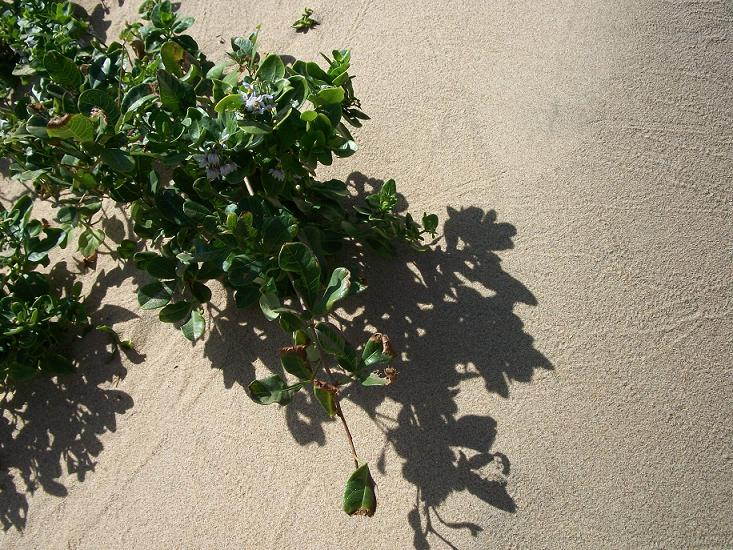
A sand dune.

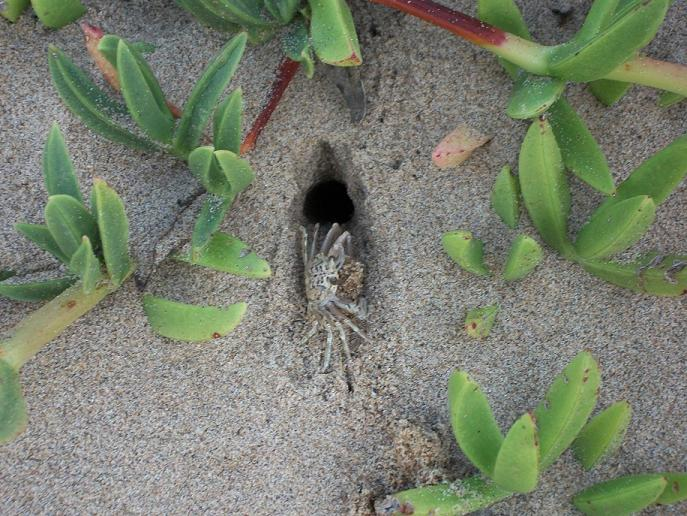
A ghost crab.

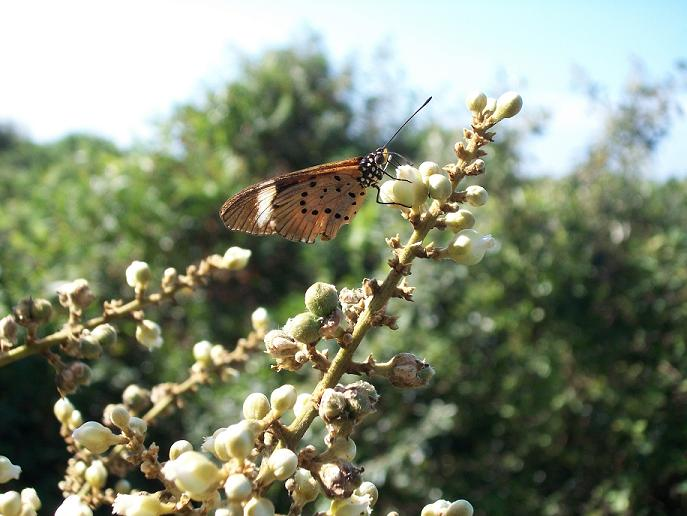
An Acraea on Deinbollia oblongifolia flowers.
