= Monkey apple =

Monkey apple or monkey's apple is a common name for several plants and may refer to:

- Annona glabra, a tropical fruit tree
- Licania platypus, a tree species native to Central America
- Mimusops coriacea, a species native to islands of the Indian Ocean
- Fruit of Posoqueria latifolia
- Syzygium smithii, an Australian tree, also naturalised in New Zealand
