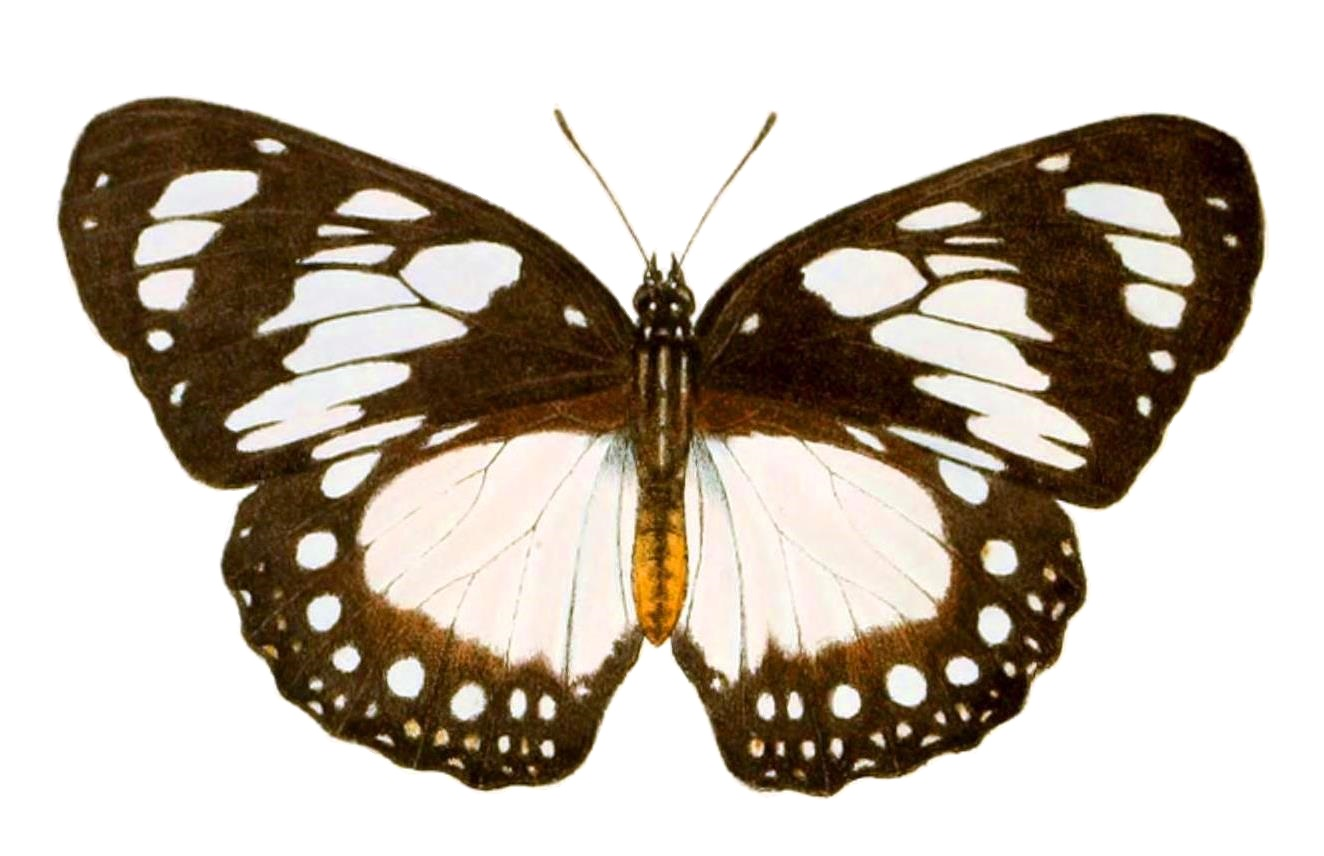
- ♀ Euxanthe wakefieldi
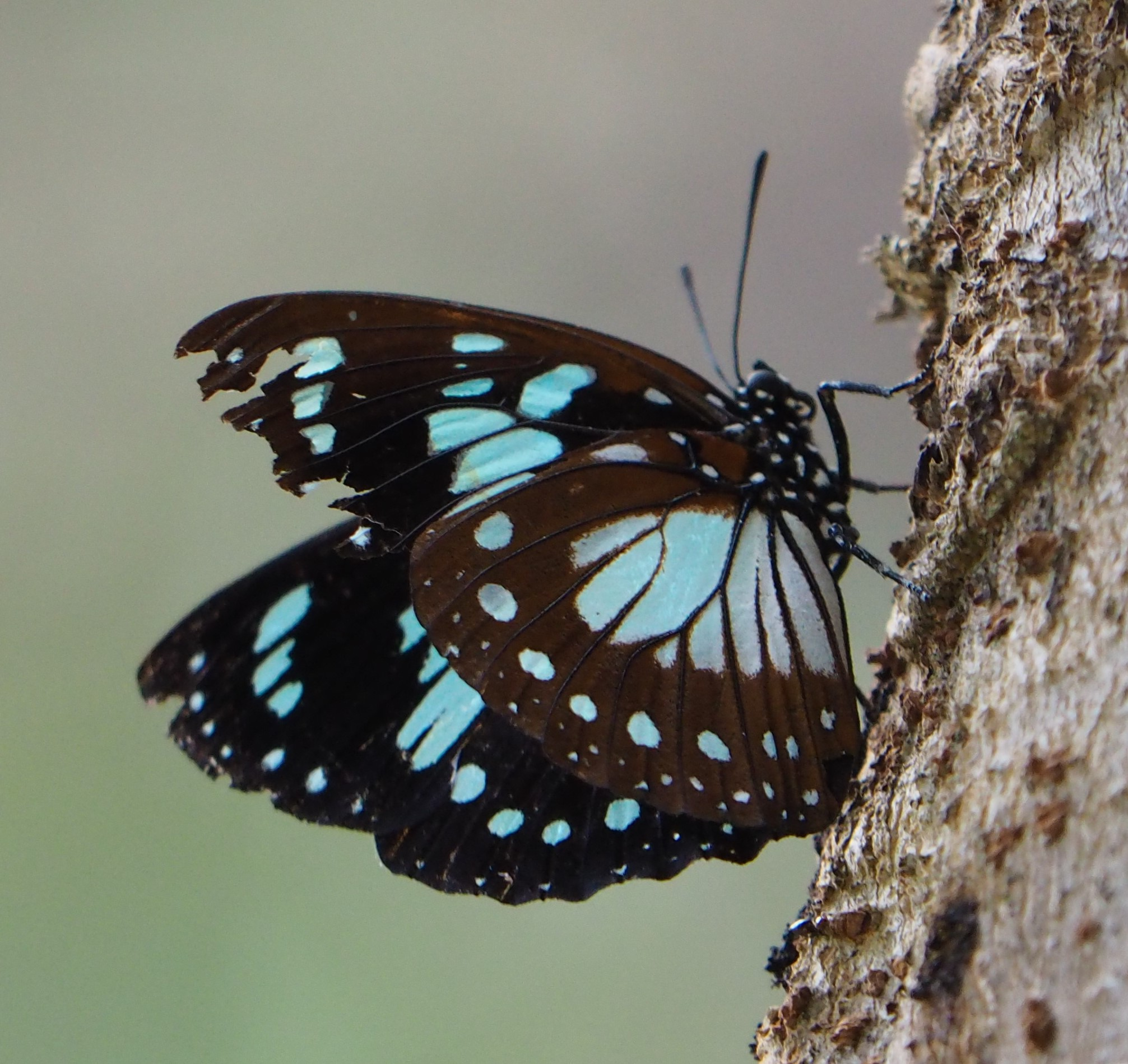
- In Udzungwa Mountains National Park

Conservation status
- Least Concern (IUCN 3.1)

Scientific classification
- Kingdom: Animalia
- Phylum: Arthropoda
- Class: Insecta
- Order: Lepidoptera
- Family: Nymphalidae
- Genus: Euxanthe
- Species: E. wakefieldi

Binomial name
- Euxanthe wakefieldi (Ward, 1873)

Synonyms
- Godartia wakefieldi Ward, 1873; Euxanthe wakefieldi f. rubiginea Le Cerf, 1923

= Euxanthe wakefieldi =

Forest queen

Species of butterfly

Euxanthe wakefieldi, the forest queen, is a butterfly of the family Nymphalidae. It is found in South Africa, from KwaZulu-Natal to Eswatini and the north-eastern Limpopo, north into eastern Africa. The wingspan is 65–72 mm for males and 80–90 mm for females. Adults are on wing year round, with a peak from March to June. The larvae feed on Deinbollia species (including D. oblongifolia), Sapindus, Blighia, and Phialodiscus species. They are notable for their spectacular horns.
