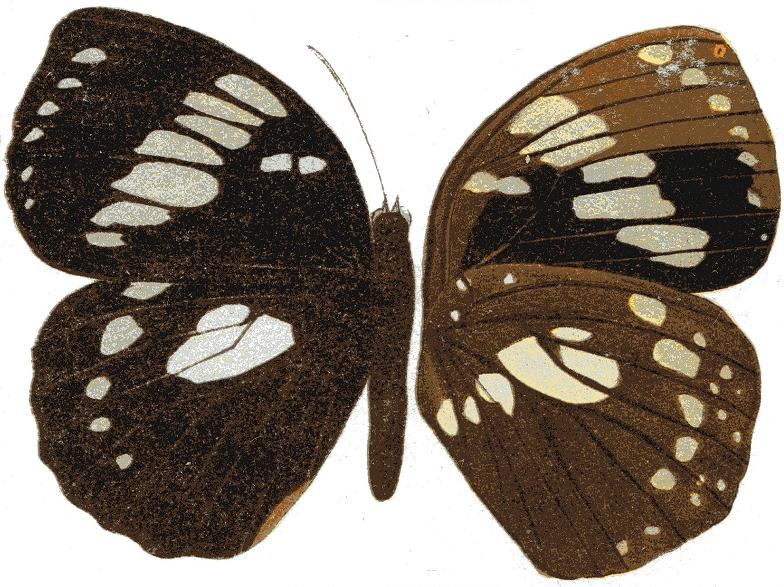

Scientific classification
- Domain: Eukaryota
- Kingdom: Animalia
- Phylum: Arthropoda
- Class: Insecta
- Order: Lepidoptera
- Family: Nymphalidae
- Genus: Euxanthe
- Species: E. madagascariensis

Binomial name
- Euxanthe madagascariensis (H. Lucas, 1843)

Synonyms
- Godartia madagascariensis H. Lucas, 1843; Charaxes madagascariensis; Anthora amakosa Doubleday, 1850; Euthanthe madagascariensis f. catalai Le Moult, 1933

= Euxanthe madagascariensis =

Species of butterfly

Euxanthe madagascariensis is a butterfly in the family Nymphalidae first described by Hippolyte Lucas in 1843. It is found on Madagascar. The habitat consists of forests.
