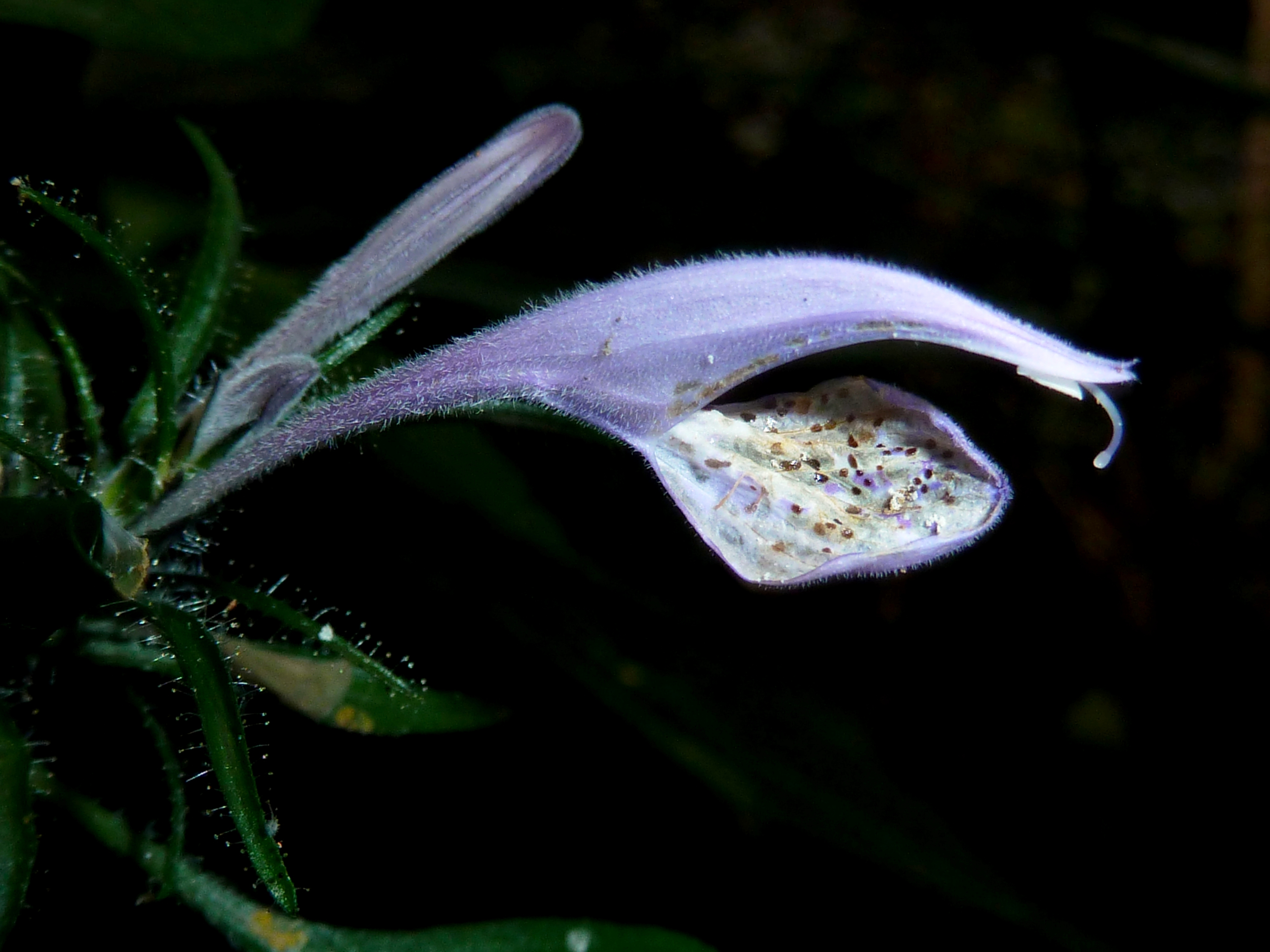
- Isoglossa cooperi

Scientific classification
- Kingdom: Plantae
- Clade: Tracheophytes
- Clade: Angiosperms
- Clade: Eudicots
- Clade: Asterids
- Order: Lamiales
- Family: Acanthaceae
- Subfamily: Acanthoideae
- Tribe: Justicieae
- Genus: Isoglossa; Oerst. (1855), nom. cons.

Species
- See text

Synonyms
- Chingiacanthus Hand.-Mazz. (1934); Ecteinanthus T.Anderson (1863), nom. superfl.; Homilacanthus S.Moore (1894); Leda C.B.Clarke (1908), nom. illeg.; Plagiotheca Chiov. (1935); Rhytiglossa Nees (1836), nom. rej.; Schliebenia Mildbr. (1934); Strophacanthus Lindau (1895)

= Isoglossa =

Genus of flowering plants

Isoglossa is a genus of flowering plants in the family Acanthaceae. It includes 78 species native to tropical Africa, Yemen, the eastern Himalayas, southern China, Indochina, Peninsular Malaysia, Java, Sulawesi, the Lesser Sunda Islands, and New South Wales.

== Species ==
78 species are accepted:

- Isoglossa angusta (Nees) Baker
- Isoglossa anisophylla Brummitt
- Isoglossa asystasioides I.Darbysh. & Ensermu
- Isoglossa bondwaensis I.Darbysh.
- Isoglossa bracteosa Mildbr.
- Isoglossa bruceae I.Darbysh.
- Isoglossa candelabrum Lindau
- Isoglossa cataractarum Brummitt & Feika
- Isoglossa ciliata (Nees) Engl.
- Isoglossa clemensiorum (Benoist) B.Hansen
- Isoglossa collina (T.Anderson) B.Hansen
- Isoglossa comorensis Lindau
- Isoglossa congesta Hedrén
- Isoglossa cooperi C.B.Clarke
- Isoglossa cyclophylla Mildbr.
- Isoglossa darbyshirei Champl. & Eb.Fisch.
- Isoglossa delicatula C.B.Clarke
- Isoglossa dichotoma (Hassk.) B.Hansen
- Isoglossa dispersa I.Darbysh. & L.J.Pearce
- Isoglossa eburnea Onjalal. & I.Darbysh.
- Isoglossa eliasbandae Brummitt
- Isoglossa eranthemoides (F.Muell.) R.M.Barker
- Isoglossa expansa Benoist
- Isoglossa eylesii (S.Moore) Brummitt
- Isoglossa faulknerae I.Darbysh.
- Isoglossa floribunda C.B.Clarke
- Isoglossa geoffrayi (Benoist) B.Hansen
- Isoglossa glabra (Hand.-Mazz.) B.Hansen
- Isoglossa glandulifera Lindau
- Isoglossa glandulosissima K.Balkwill
- Isoglossa gracillima Baker
- Isoglossa grandiflora S.Moore
- Isoglossa gregorii (S.Moore) Lindau
- Isoglossa humbertii Mildbr.
- Isoglossa hypoestiflora Lindau
- Isoglossa inermis (Benoist) B.Hansen
- Isoglossa ixodes Lindau
- Isoglossa justicioides Baker
- Isoglossa lactea Lindau ex Engl.
- Isoglossa laxa Oliv.
- Isoglossa laxiflora Lindau
- Isoglossa longiflora Benoist
- Isoglossa macowanii C.B.Clarke
- Isoglossa mbalensis Brummitt
- Isoglossa melleri Baker
- Isoglossa membranacea C.B.Clarke
- Isoglossa milanjiensis S.Moore
- Isoglossa mossambicensis Lindau
- Isoglossa multinervis I.Darbysh.
- Isoglossa namuliensis I.Darbysh. & T.Harris
- Isoglossa nervosa C.B.Clarke
- Isoglossa onilahensis (Benoist) I.Darbysh.
- Isoglossa oreacanthoides Mildbr.
- Isoglossa origanoides (Nees) S.Moore
- Isoglossa ovata (Nees) Lindau
- Isoglossa parviflora Benoist
- Isoglossa parvifolia Rendle
- Isoglossa paucinervis I.Darbysh.
- Isoglossa pawekiae Brummitt & Feika
- Isoglossa perdita I.Darbysh.
- Isoglossa perplexa (T.F.Daniel, Letsara & Martín-Bravo) I.Darbysh. & Kiel
- Isoglossa prolixa (Nees) Lindau
- Isoglossa pseudoanisotes I.Darbysh.
- Isoglossa pterocalyx I.Darbysh. & Phillipson
- Isoglossa punctata (Vahl) Brummitt & J.R.I.Wood
- Isoglossa rubescens Lindau
- Isoglossa rutenbergiana Vatke
- Isoglossa somalensis Lindau
- Isoglossa strigosula C.B.Clarke
- Isoglossa subcordata (C.B.Clarke) B.Hansen
- Isoglossa substrobilina C.B.Clarke
- Isoglossa ufipensis Brummitt
- Isoglossa variegata I.Darbysh.
- Isoglossa ventricosa I.Darbysh.
- Isoglossa vestita Benoist
- Isoglossa vulcanicola Mildbr.
- Isoglossa woodii C.B.Clarke
