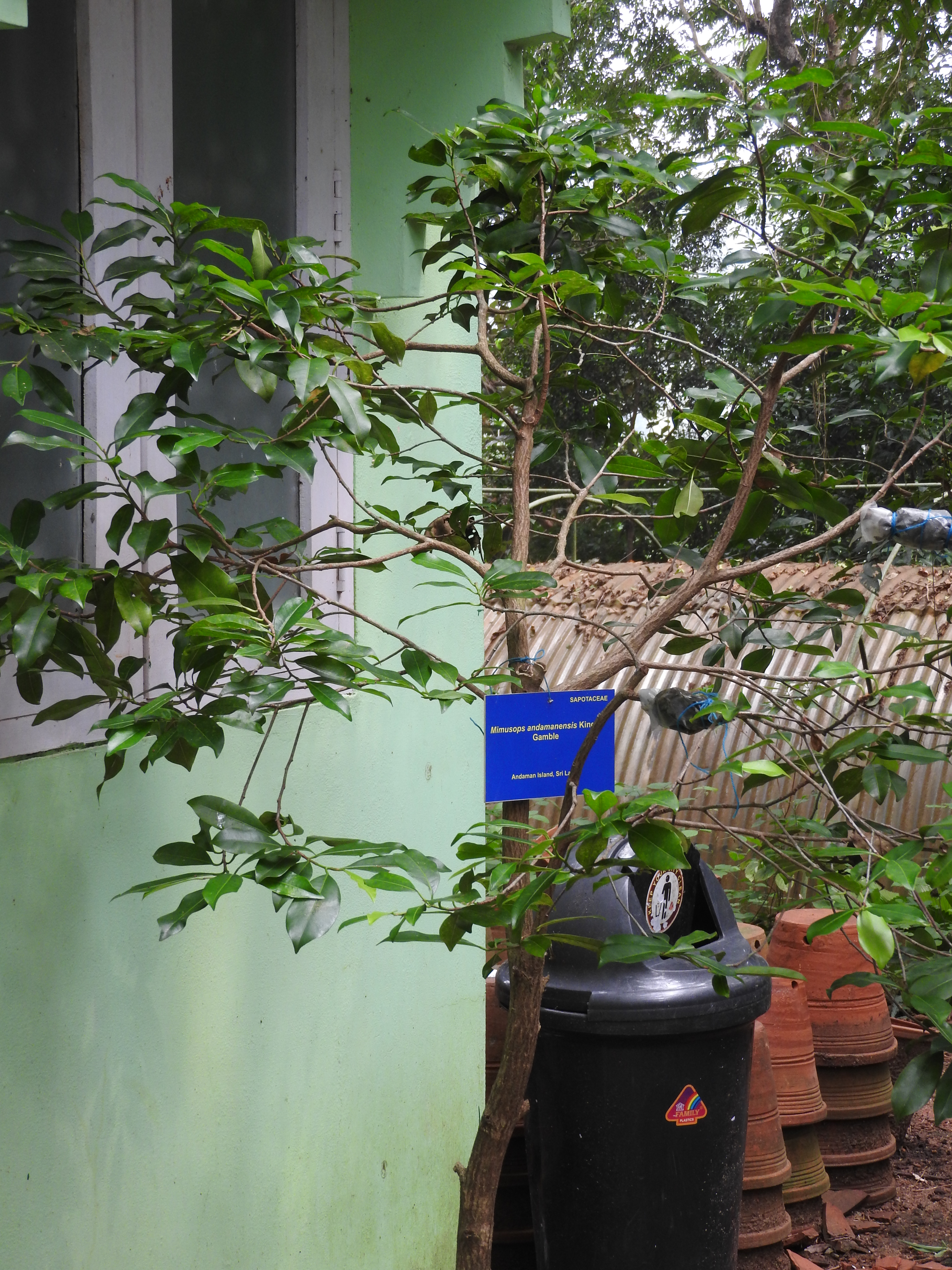

Scientific classification
- Kingdom: Plantae
- Clade: Tracheophytes
- Clade: Angiosperms
- Clade: Eudicots
- Clade: Asterids
- Order: Ericales
- Family: Sapotaceae
- Genus: Mimusops
- Species: M. andamanensis

Binomial name
- Mimusops andamanensis King & Gamble

= Mimusops andamanensis =

Species of flowering plant

Mimusops andamanensis is a species of plant in the family Sapotaceae. It is native to Sri Lanka and the Andaman Islands.
