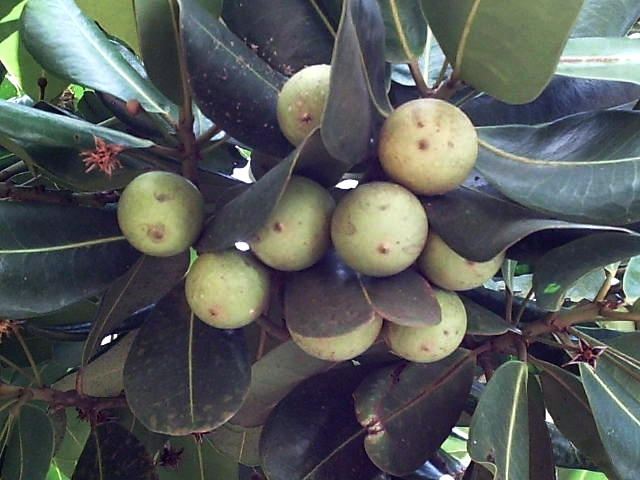
- Mimusops balata

Scientific classification
- Kingdom: Plantae
- Clade: Tracheophytes
- Clade: Angiosperms
- Clade: Eudicots
- Clade: Asterids
- Order: Ericales
- Family: Sapotaceae
- Subfamily: Sapotoideae
- Genus: Mimusops; L.

Synonyms
- Elengi Adans.; Binectaria Forssk.; Imbricaria Comm. ex Juss.; Kaukenia Kuntze; Phlebolithis Gaertn.

= Mimusops =

Genus of flowering plants

Mimusops is a genus of plants in the family Sapotaceae, described as a genus by Linnaeus in 1753.

Mimusops is native to tropical and subtropical regions of Asia, Africa, Australia, and various oceanic islands.

== Species ==
As of February 2025, Plants of the World Online accepted these species:

- Mimusops acutifolia Mildbr. – Tanzania
- Mimusops aedificatoria Mildbr. – Tanzania, Kenya, Malawi
- Mimusops afra E.Mey. ex A.DC. – Mozambique, South Africa (Cape Province, KwaZulu-Natal)
- Mimusops andamanensis King & Gamble – Andaman Islands
- Mimusops andongensis Hiern – West and Central Africa
- Mimusops angel Chiov. – Somalia
- Mimusops ankaibeensis Capuron ex Aubrév. – Madagascar
- Mimusops antongilensis Aubrév. – Madagascar
- Mimusops antorakensis Aubrév. – Madagascar
- Mimusops antsiranensis F.Friedmann – Madagascar
- Mimusops bagshawei S.Moore – East Africa
- Mimusops balata (Aubl.) C.F.Gaertn. – Mauritius, Réunion
- Mimusops boeniensis Randrianaivo – Madagascar
- Mimusops capuronii Aubrév. – Madagascar
- Mimusops comorensis Engl. – Comoros
- Mimusops coriacea (A.DC.) Miq. – Comoros, Madagascar
- Mimusops dodensis Engl. – Cameroon
- Mimusops ebolowensis Engl. & K.Krause – Cameroon
- Mimusops elengi L. – South and Southeast Asia, Papuasia
- Mimusops erythroxylon Bojer ex A.DC. – Mauritius
- Mimusops giorgii De Wild. – Democratic Republic of the Congo
- Mimusops kummel Bruce ex A.DC. – Tropical Africa
- Mimusops laurifolia (Forssk.) Friis – Northeast Africa, Saudi Arabia, Yemen
- Mimusops lecomtei H.J.Lam – Madagascar
- Mimusops lohindri Aubrév. – Madagascar
- Mimusops longipedicellata Aubrév. – Madagascar
- Mimusops masoalensis Randrianaivo – Madagascar
- Mimusops mayumbensis Greves – Cabinda
- Mimusops membranacea Aubrév. – Madagascar
- Mimusops mildbraedii Engl. & K.Krause – Cameroon
- Mimusops ngembe Engl. & K.Krause – Cameroon
- Mimusops nossibeensis Capuron ex Aubrév. – Nosi Bé Island
- Mimusops oblongifolia Dubard – Réunion
- Mimusops obovata Sond. – Mozambique, Eswatini, South Africa
- Mimusops obtusifolia Lam. – East and Southeast Africa, Comoros, Madagascar
- Mimusops occidentalis Aubrév. – Madagascar
- Mimusops penduliflora Engl. – Tanzania
- Mimusops perrieri Capuron ex Aubrév. – Madagascar
- Mimusops petiolaris (A.DC.) Dubard – Mauritius
- Mimusops riparia Engl. – Kenya, Tanzania
- Mimusops sambiranensis Aubrév. – Madagascar
- Mimusops sechellarum (Oliv.) Hemsl. – Seychelles
- Mimusops somalensis Chiov. – Kenya, Tanzania, Somalia
- Mimusops voalela Aubrév. – Madagascar
- Mimusops zeyheri Sond. – Central and Southern Africa
- Mimusops zeylanica Kosterm. – Sri Lanka
