= Mimusops riparia =

Conservation status
- Vulnerable (IUCN 2.3)

Scientific classification
- Kingdom: Plantae
- Clade: Tracheophytes
- Clade: Angiosperms
- Clade: Eudicots
- Clade: Asterids
- Order: Ericales
- Family: Sapotaceae
- Genus: Mimusops
- Species: M. riparia

Binomial name
- Mimusops riparia Engl.

Synonyms
- Mimusops dependens Engl.; Mimusops useguhensis Engl.

Species of flowering plant

Mimusops riparia is a species of plant in the family Sapotaceae. It is found in Kenya and Tanzania.
