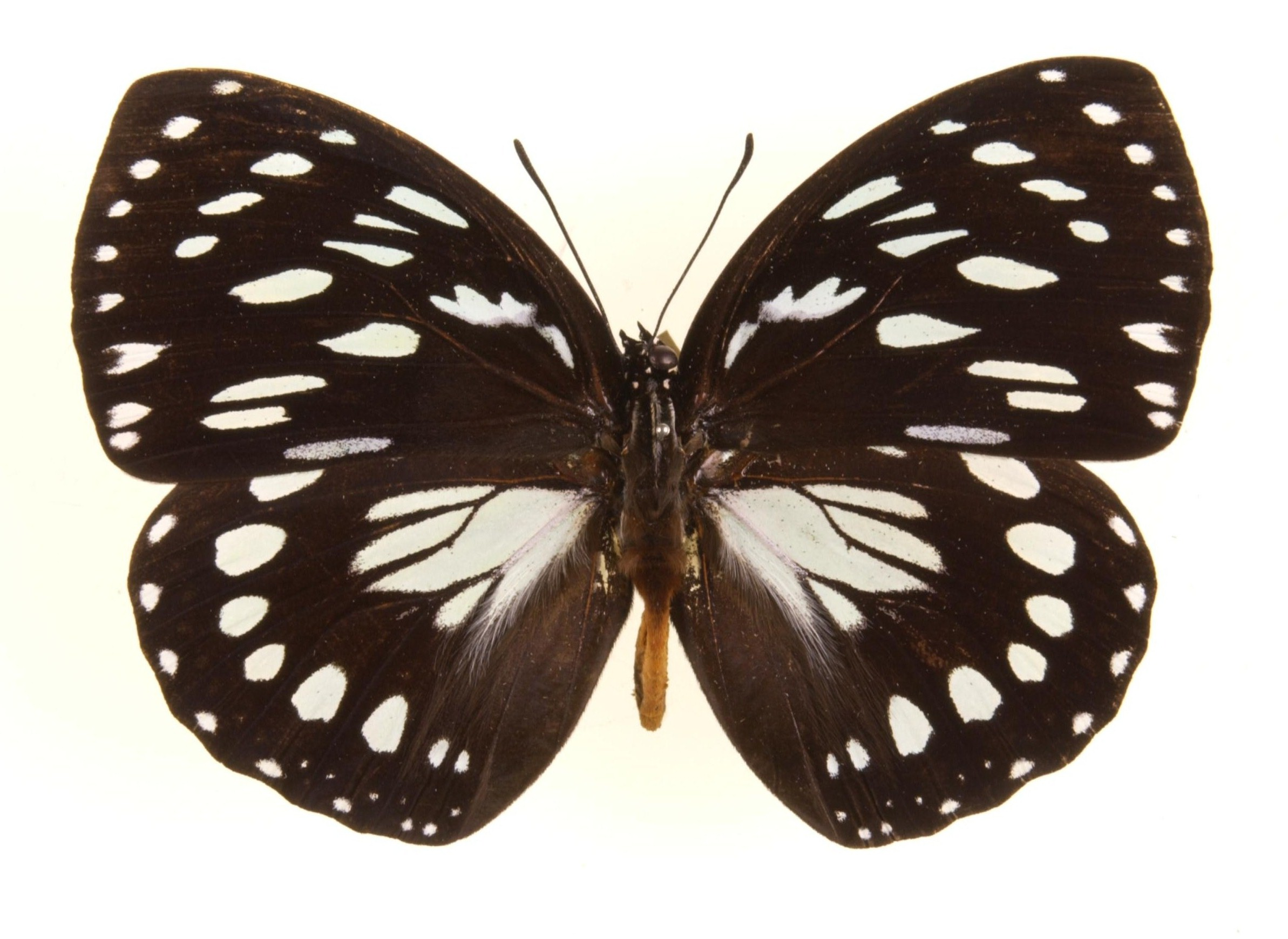

Scientific classification
- Kingdom: Animalia
- Phylum: Arthropoda
- Clade: Pancrustacea
- Class: Insecta
- Order: Lepidoptera
- Family: Nymphalidae
- Genus: Euxanthe
- Species: E. eurinome

Binomial name
- Euxanthe eurinome (Cramer, [1775])

Synonyms
- Papilio eurinome Cramer, 1775; Charaxes eurinome; Euxanthe eurinome f. johnsoni Howarth, 1969; Godartia ansellica Butler, 1870; Euxanthe eurinome burgeoni Le Cerf, 1923; Euxanthe eurinome ansellica f. radiata van Someren and Rogers, 1928; Euxanthe eurinome elgonae van Someren, 1975

= Euxanthe eurinome =

Species of butterfly

Euxanthe eurinome, the common forest queen, is a butterfly in the family Nymphalidae. It is found in Senegal, Guinea, Sierra Leone, Liberia, Ivory Coast, Ghana, Nigeria, Equatorial Guinea, Cameroon, Gabon, the Democratic Republic of the Congo, Angola, the Central African Republic, Uganda, Kenya and Ethiopia. The habitat consists of lowland evergreen forests and dry and degraded forests.

Adults are attracted to carnivore dung and fruit.

The larvae feed on Afzelia africana, Deinbollia pinnata, Blighia and Phialodiscus species.

== Subspecies ==
- Euxanthe eurinome eurinome (Senegal, Guinea, Sierra Leone, Liberia, Ivory Coast, Ghana, Nigeria, Bioko, southern Cameroon)
- Euxanthe eurinome ansellica (Butler, 1870) (southern Cameroon, Gabon, eastern Democratic Republic of the Congo, northern Angola, Central African Republic, eastern and central Uganda)
- Euxanthe eurinome birbirica Ungemach, 1932 (Uganda: north to the west of the Madi district, western Kenya, south-western Ethiopia)
- Euxanthe eurinome celadon Le Cerf, 1923 (Gabon)

Torben Larsen developed a species numbering system for his 2005 publication Butterflies of West Africa. The nominate subspecies is #780. The 'Larsen' numbers have since been used with permission in A Sharp Eye on Butterflies of Ghana.
