= Mimusops angel =

Conservation status
- Near Threatened (IUCN 2.3)

Scientific classification
- Kingdom: Plantae
- Clade: Tracheophytes
- Clade: Angiosperms
- Clade: Eudicots
- Clade: Asterids
- Order: Ericales
- Family: Sapotaceae
- Genus: Mimusops
- Species: M. angel

Binomial name
- Mimusops angel Chiov.

Species of flowering plant

Mimusops angel is a species of plant in the family Sapotaceae. It is endemic to Somalia, growing mainly in the Bari Region along creeks flowing into the Indian Ocean. This species is threatened by habitat loss. It's locally known as Canjeel or Anjeel.
