= Mimusops acutifolia =

Conservation status
- Vulnerable (IUCN 2.3)

Scientific classification
- Kingdom: Plantae
- Clade: Embryophytes
- Clade: Tracheophytes
- Clade: Angiosperms
- Clade: Eudicots
- Clade: Asterids
- Order: Ericales
- Family: Sapotaceae
- Genus: Mimusops
- Species: M. acutifolia

Binomial name
- Mimusops acutifolia Mildbr.

Species of flowering plant

Mimusops acutifolia is a species of flowering plant in the family Sapotaceae. It is endemic to Tanzania.
