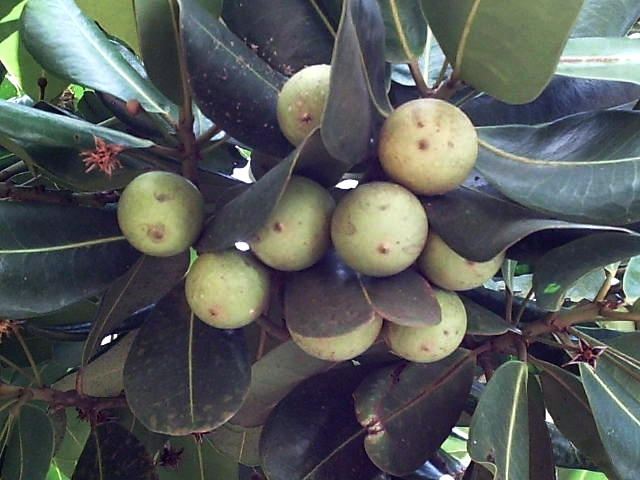

Scientific classification
- Kingdom: Plantae
- Clade: Tracheophytes
- Clade: Angiosperms
- Clade: Eudicots
- Clade: Asterids
- Order: Ericales
- Family: Sapotaceae
- Genus: Mimusops
- Species: M. balata

Binomial name
- Mimusops balata (Aubl.) C.F.Gaertn.

Synonyms
- Achras balata Aubl.; Imbricaria balata (Aubl.) A.Chev.; Binectaria borbonica Kuntze; Imbricaria binectaria A.DC.; Imbricaria borbonica Juss. ex J.F.Gmel.; Imbricaria commersonii G.Don; Imbricaria gigantea Pierre ex Baill.; Imbricaria maxima Poir.; Kaukenia commersonii (G.Don) Pierre ex Engl.; Mimusops balota Blume; Mimusops commersonii (G.Don) Engl.; Mimusops imbricaria Willd.; Mimusops maxima (Poir.) R.E.Vaughan; Mimusops nattarium P.Willemet; Mimusops retusa P.Willemet

= Mimusops balata =

Species of flowering plant

Mimusops balata is a species of flowering plant in the family Sapotaceae. It is native to Mauritius and Réunion.
