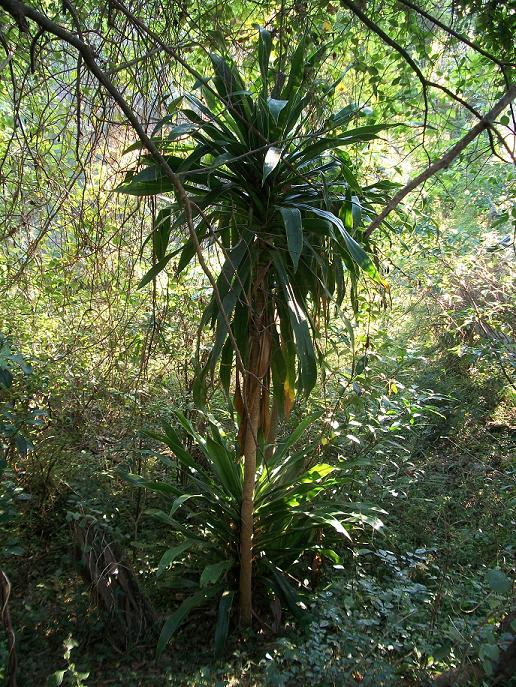

Scientific classification
- Kingdom: Plantae
- Clade: Tracheophytes
- Clade: Angiosperms
- Clade: Monocots
- Order: Asparagales
- Family: Asparagaceae
- Subfamily: Convallarioideae
- Genus: Dracaena
- Species: D. aletriformis

Binomial name
- Dracaena aletriformis (Haw.) Bos

Synonyms
- Dracaena hookeriana K.Koch [family DRACAENACEAE] Pleomele hookeriana (K.Koch) N.E.Br. [family DRACAENACEAE] Dracaena rumphii (Hook.) Regel [family DRACAENACEAE] Dracaena latifolia Regel [family DRACAENACEAE] Draco hookeriana (K.Koch) Kuntze [family DRACAENACEAE] Cordyline rumphii Hook. [family AGAVACEAE] Yucca aletriformis Haw. [family AGAVACEAE] Sansevieria paniculata Schinz [family DRACAENACEAE]

= Dracaena aletriformis =

Large-leaved dragon tree

Species of flowering plant

Dracaena aletriformis is commonly known as the large-leaved dragon tree. These plants are found in forest in the eastern areas of South Africa from Port Elizabeth to northern and eastern Limpopo. They are also found in Eswatini, but are most common in the coastal and dune forests of KwaZulu-Natal.

== Taxonomy ==
This plant has 8 synonyms. In the APG III classification system, the genus Dracaena is placed in the family Asparagaceae, subfamily Convallarioideae (formerly the family Ruscaceae). It has also been placed in the Agavaceae (now the subfamily Agavoideae) and the Dracaenaceae. Like many lilioid monocots, it was formerly placed in the family Liliaceae (lily family).

== Description ==
Single stemmed or branched (usually at the base). The leaves are large and strap-shaped in rosettes at the tips of the stem/s. The leaves are leathery, shiny, and dark green, with whitish margins. These plants may grow up to 4 metres (13 ft) tall. The flowers are produced on a much branched flowering head. The flowers are silvery-white and described as sweetly or strongly scented. The two-lobed berry-like fruit ripen to a reddish-orange colour.

== Ecological significance ==
The flowers open from late afternoon to early morning and attract night-active pollinator moths. Birds eat the fruit; helping to remove the orange pulp which contains a growth inhibitor that otherwise slows germination of the seeds. Snails and the larvae of the Bush Night Fighter butterfly, Artitropa erinnys, feed on the leaves. Birds and mice nest among the leaves of these plants.

== Gallery ==
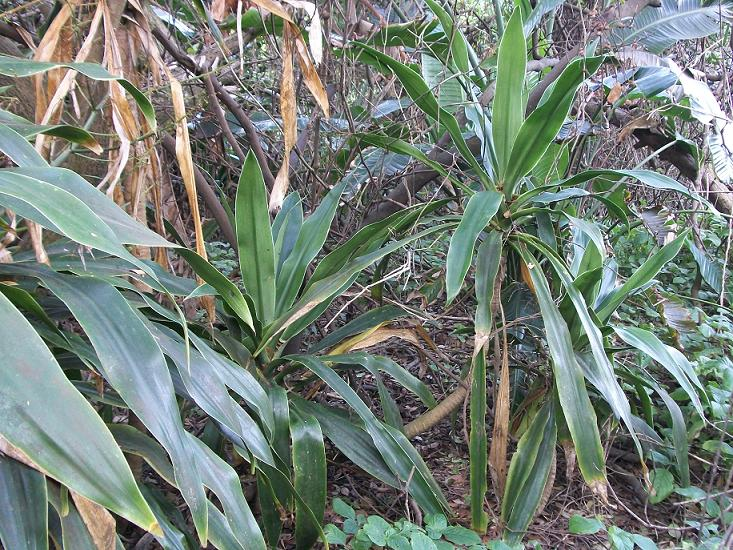
A group of D. aletriformis in dune vegetation.

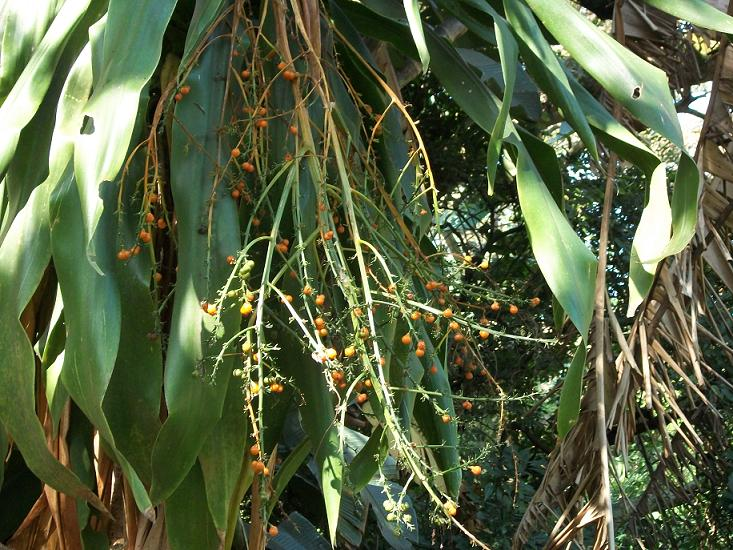
Fruit of D. aletriformis.

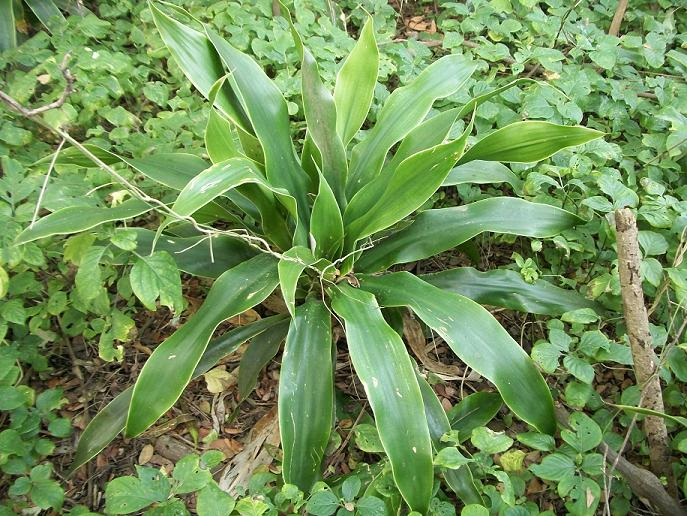
Surrounded by Isoglossa woodii in dune vegetation.

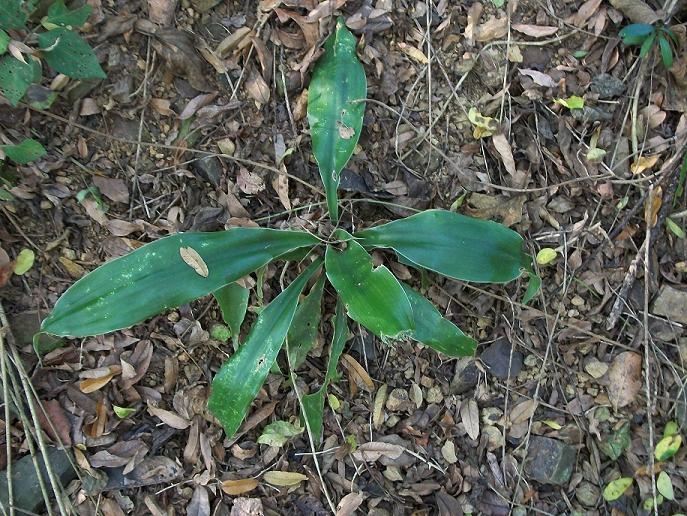
A young specimen.
