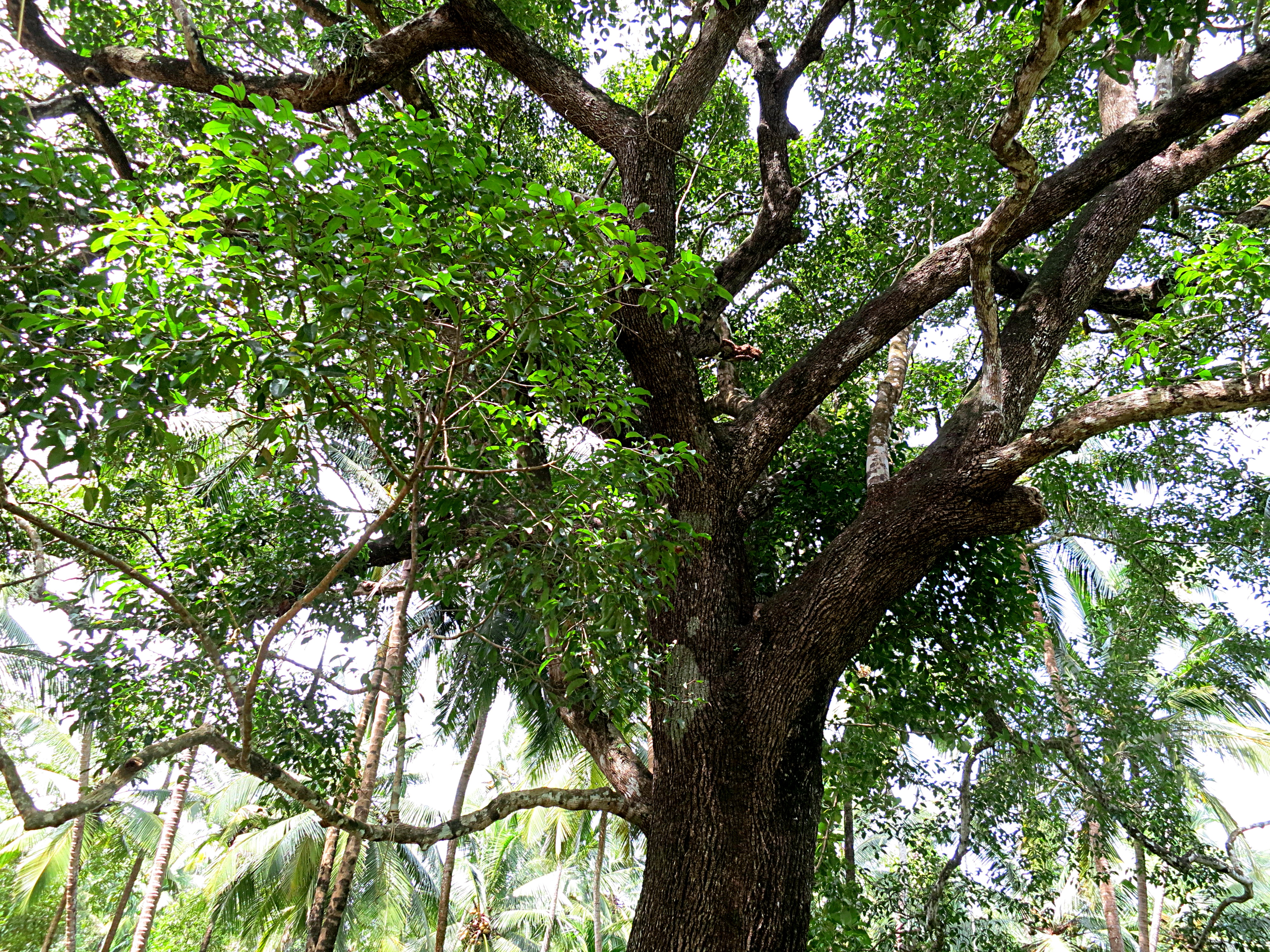

Conservation status
- Least Concern (IUCN 3.1)

Scientific classification
- Kingdom: Plantae
- Clade: Tracheophytes
- Clade: Angiosperms
- Clade: Eudicots
- Clade: Asterids
- Order: Ericales
- Family: Sapotaceae
- Genus: Mimusops
- Species: M. elengi

Binomial name
- Mimusops elengi L.

= Mimusops elengi =

Species of tree

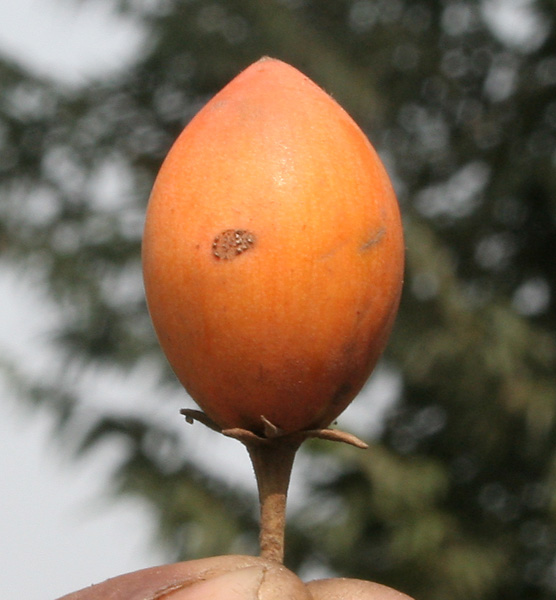
The ripe fruit has many traditional uses.

Mimusops elengi is a medium-sized evergreen tree found in tropical forests in South Asia, Southeast Asia and northern Australia. English common names include Spanish cherry, medlar, and bullet wood. Its timber is valuable and its fruit is edible. As the trees give thick shade and flowers emit fragrance, it is a prized collection for gardens. It is used as an ornamental tree in many places. The flowers may also be used in natural perfume.

Its flower is the provincial flower of Yala Province, Thailand, as well as the city flower of Ampang Jaya, Selangor, Malaysia.

== Tree description ==
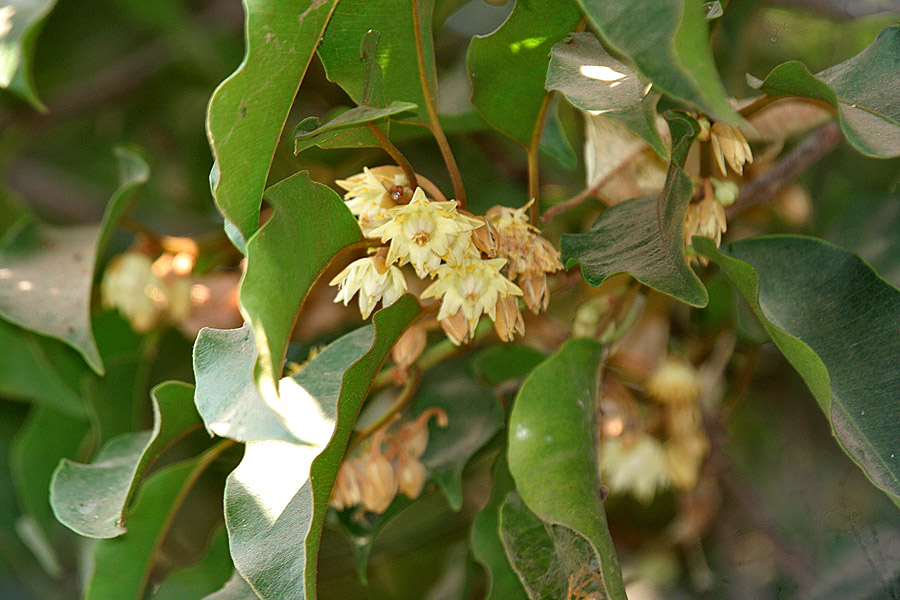
Flowers in Hyderabad, India

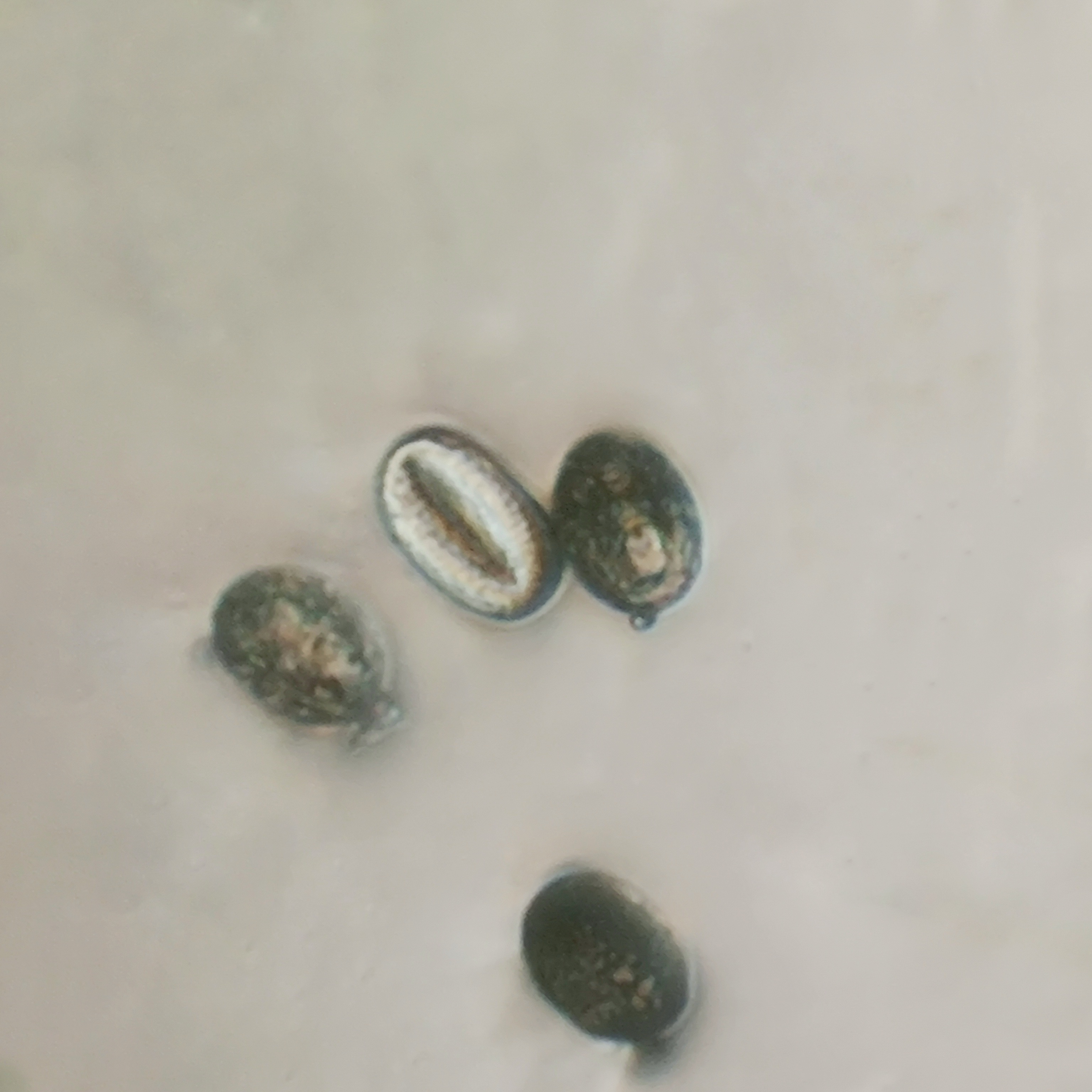
Pollen grains of Mimusops elengi

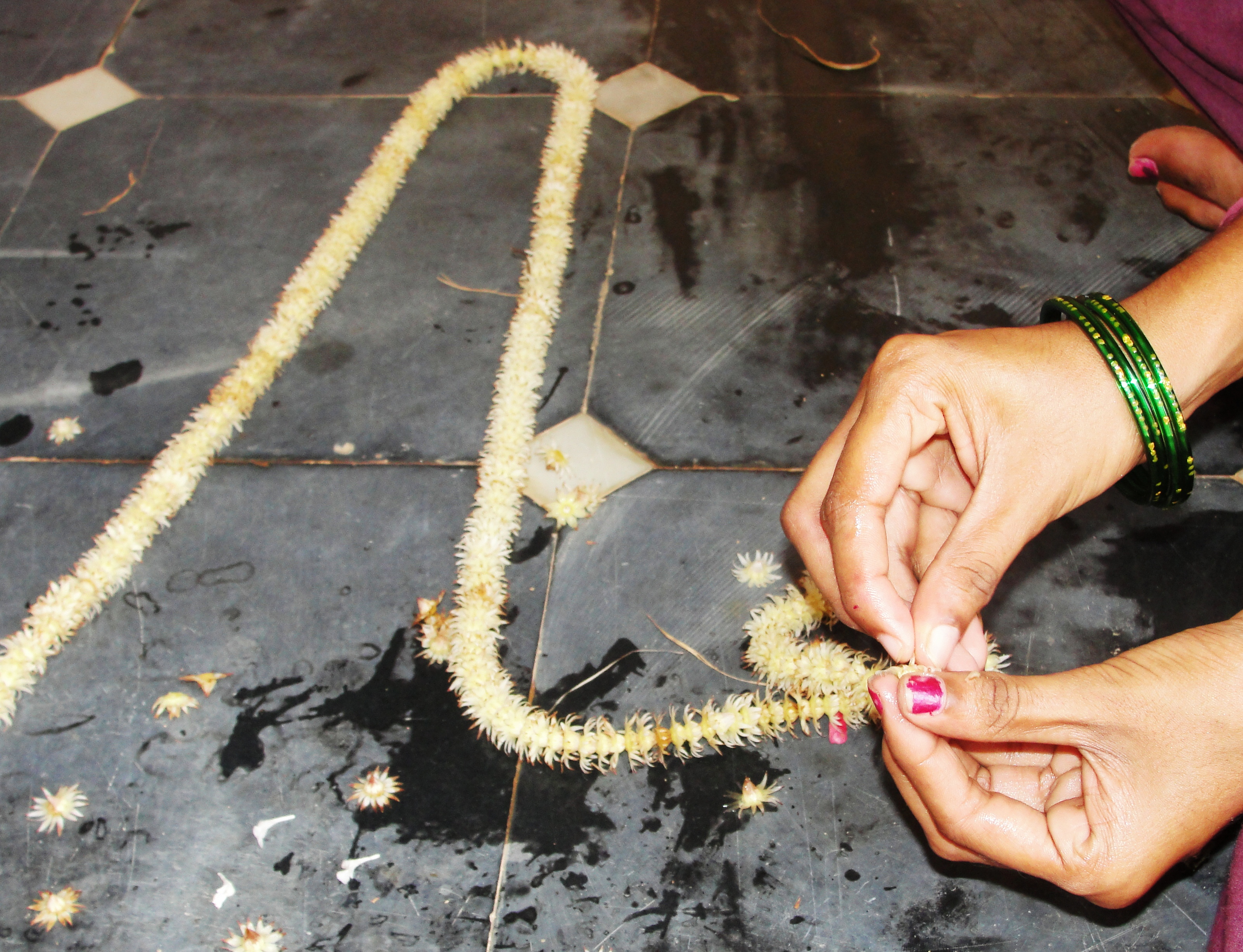
Flowers are made into garlands

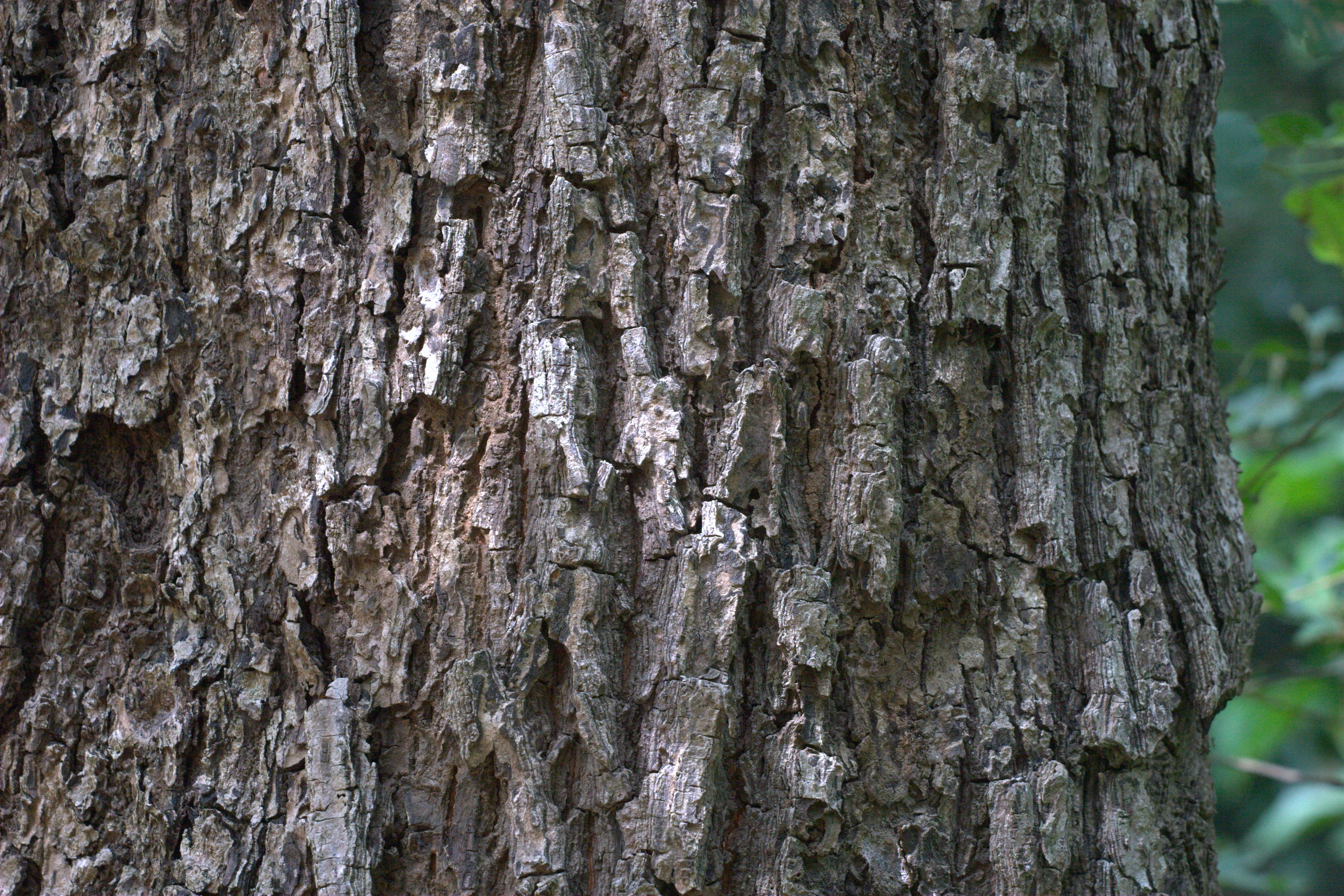
Bark

Bullet wood is an evergreen tree reaching a height of about 15 m (49 ft). It flowers in April, and fruiting occurs between June and October. The leaves are glossy, dark green, oval-shaped, 5–14 cm (2.0–5.5 in) long, and 2.5–6 cm (0.98–2.36 in) wide. The flowers are cream and hairy. The flowers are also heavily scented. The fruits are fleshy, range in color between yellow and brown, and contain a large brown seed. The pulp has a yellow color and it is edible. The bark of the tree is thick and appears dark brownish black or grayish black in colour, with striations and a few cracks on the surface. The tree may reach up to a height of 9–18 m (30–59 ft) with about 1 m (3 ft 3 in) in circumference.

The seeds are just like the seeds of custard apple. The seeds are approximately 1 to 1.5 cm (0.5 inches) in length and have a brownish black hard coat. They are quite easy to germinate. The process of soaking is helpful in speeding up the germination process. The trees like full sun. They grow with a moderate pace.

== Distribution ==
The plant is native to South and Southeast Asia, particularly the coastal areas of the Indian subcontinent, Vietnam and Myanmar, as well as Northern Australia. It was introduced in China in the 20th century, and is now cultivated in its south, as well as in Taiwan.

== Other uses ==
- The flowers are sun dried and used to make floral infusions and as an addition to green tea in Thailand.
- The edible fruit is softly hairy becoming smooth, ovoid, bright red-orange when ripe.
- The wood is a luxurious wood that is extremely hard, strong and tough, and rich deep red in color. The heartwood is sharply defined from the sapwood. It works easily and takes a beautiful polish. Density is 1008 kg per cubic meter.
