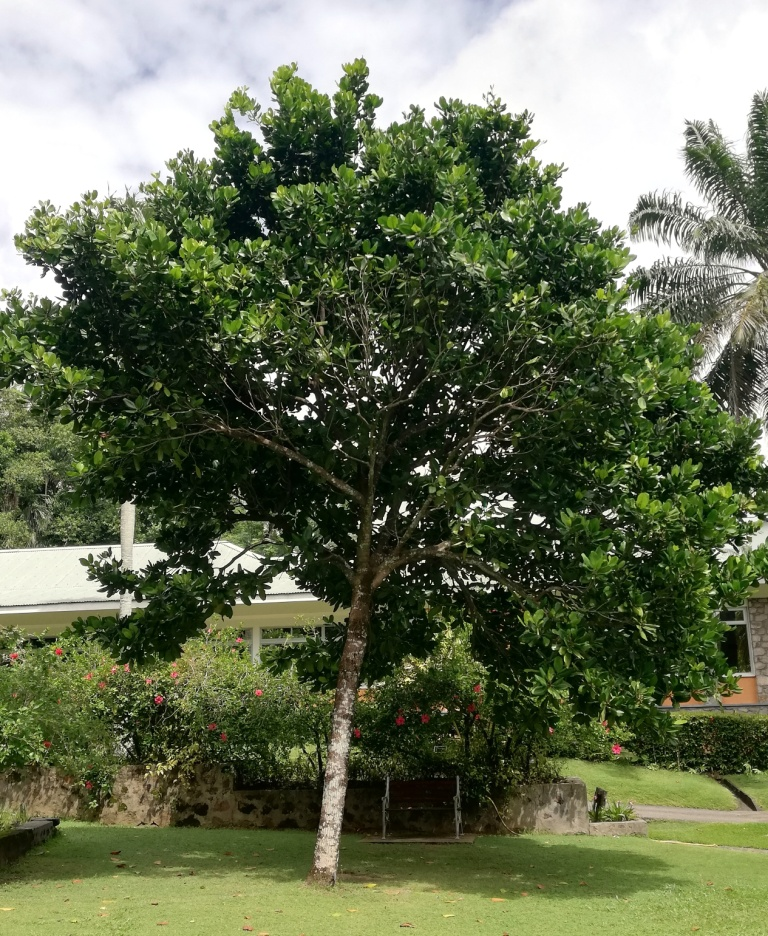

Conservation status
- Near Threatened (IUCN 3.1)

Scientific classification
- Kingdom: Plantae
- Clade: Tracheophytes
- Clade: Angiosperms
- Clade: Eudicots
- Clade: Asterids
- Order: Ericales
- Family: Sapotaceae
- Genus: Mimusops
- Species: M. sechellarum

Binomial name
- Mimusops sechellarum (Oliv.) Hemsl.

= Mimusops sechellarum =

Species of tree

Mimusops sechellarum is a species of plant in the family Sapotaceae. It is endemic to Seychelles.
