= Isoglossa angusta =

Scientific classification
- Kingdom: Plantae
- Clade: Embryophytes
- Clade: Tracheophytes
- Clade: Angiosperms
- Clade: Eudicots
- Clade: Asterids
- Order: Lamiales
- Family: Acanthaceae
- Genus: Isoglossa
- Species: I. angusta

Binomial name
- Isoglossa angusta (Nees) Baker

Synonyms
- Clinacanthus angustus Nees; Ruellia angusta Bojer ex Nees; Ruellia salicifolia Bojer ex Nees

Species of flowering plant

Isoglossa angusta is a plant in the Acanthaceae family. It is native to Madagasccar.
