= Isoglossa nervosa =

Conservation status
- Vulnerable (IUCN 3.1)

Scientific classification
- Kingdom: Plantae
- Clade: Tracheophytes
- Clade: Angiosperms
- Clade: Eudicots
- Clade: Asterids
- Order: Lamiales
- Family: Acanthaceae
- Genus: Isoglossa
- Species: I. nervosa

Binomial name
- Isoglossa nervosa C.B.Clarke (1900)

Species of flowering plant

Isoglossa nervosa is a species of plant in the family Acanthaceae. It is an herbaceous perennial or subshrub native to southeastern Nigeria, Cameroon, and Bioko island in Equatorial Guinea. Its natural habitat is tropical montane forest from 2,000 to 2,950 meters elevation.

It has been recorded at Pico Basilé on Bioko, on Mount Cameroon and Mann's Spring, Bokwangwo, Bamboutos, Mount Oku, and the Adamawa Plateau in Cameroon, and Mabile-Ngelyaki in Nigeria. It grows in upper montane forest with Podocarpus milanjianus, Prunus africana, Myrsine melanophloeos, Nuxia congesta, and Syzygium guineense, as well as bamboo thicket, forest-grassland transition thickets, and montane grassland.
