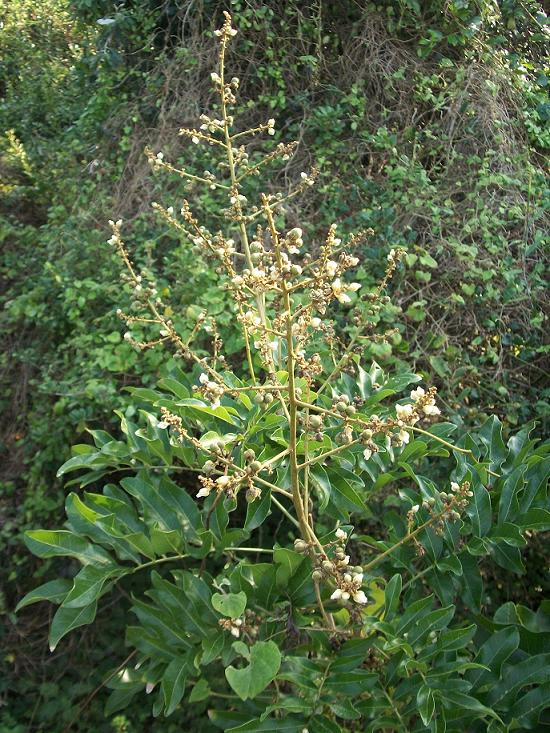

Scientific classification
- Kingdom: Plantae
- Clade: Tracheophytes
- Clade: Angiosperms
- Clade: Eudicots
- Clade: Rosids
- Order: Sapindales
- Family: Sapindaceae
- Genus: Deinbollia
- Species: D. oblongifolia

Binomial name
- Deinbollia oblongifolia (E. May. ex Arn.) Radlk.

Synonyms
- Hippobromus oblongifolius

= Deinbollia oblongifolia =

Dune soap-berry

Species of tree

Deinbollia oblongifolia is a shrub or small tree in the family Sapindaceae. It is commonly known as the dune soap-berry and is found in coastal vegetation from the Eastern Cape of South Africa, through KwaZulu-Natal to southern Mozambique and Eswatini. It is named after Peter Vogelius Deinboll (1783–1876), a Danish botanist and plant collector.

== Description ==
These plants can grow up to 9 metres (30 ft) tall. The stem often branches low down and the bark is grey brown. The leaves are compound, up to 50 centimetres (20 in) long and clustered at the ends of the branches. The flowers are white, or cream and produced on branched flowering heads at the ends of the branches. The fruit are rounded; green and velvety when young to yellow and smooth when ripe. The dune soap-berry may be confused with a young forest mahogany (Trichilia dregeana) because of the similar shaped compound leaves, however the dune soap-berry has paler green slightly matt leaves compared to the forest mahogany, which has a darker green leaf that is slightly more glossy. The leaves of the dune soap-berry are also hard textured (when mature) and not held flat as in Trichilia dregeana.

== Uses ==
The fruit is eaten by people. The leaves can be eaten as spinach, and the seeds can be lathered in water and used as soap (hence the name "soap-berry"). The roots are used in traditional Zulu medicine for stomach complaints. These shrubs are also valuable garden plants, especially in wildlife gardens.

== Ecological significance ==
The flowers attract hordes of insects including; moths, butterflies, bees, wasps, ants and beetles. The leaves are fed on by the larvae of several butterflies, including; gold-banded forester (Euphaedra neophron), forest queen (Euxanthe wakefieldi) and the purple-brown hairstreak (Hypolycaena philippus). Various Deudorix butterfly species' larvae also feed on these trees, including the larvae of the black-and-orange playboy (Deudorix dariaves) and the apricot playboy (Deudorix dinochares) which both eat the fruits of Deinbollia oblongifolia. The larvae of the African peach moth (Egybolis vaillantina) also feed on the leaves, and the fruit are also eaten by birds (including the sombre greenbul (Andropadus importunus)) and monkeys. Charaxes butterflies feed on the fermenting fruits, and the green-veined charaxes (Charaxes candiope), pearl charaxes (Charaxes varanes), satyr charaxes (Charaxes ethalion), forest-king charaxes (Charaxes xiphares), white-barred charaxes (Charaxes brutus) and the Natal tree nymph (Sevenia natalensis) have all been observed feeding on the sap of Deinbollia oblongifolia. Furthermore, these trees are browsed by game animals.

== Gallery ==
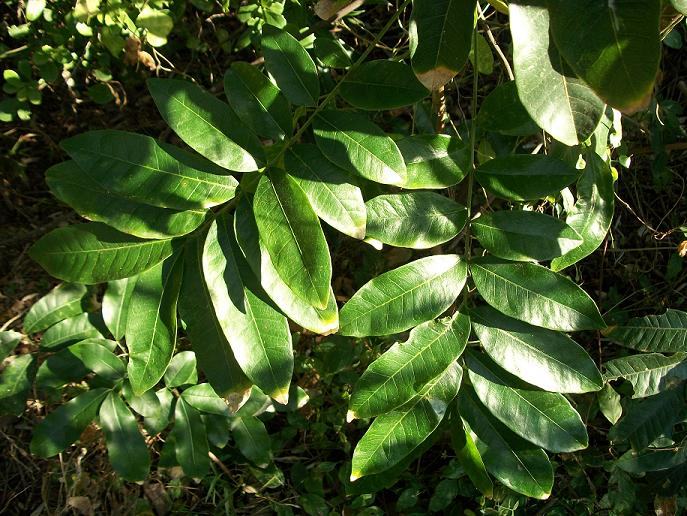
Compound leaves

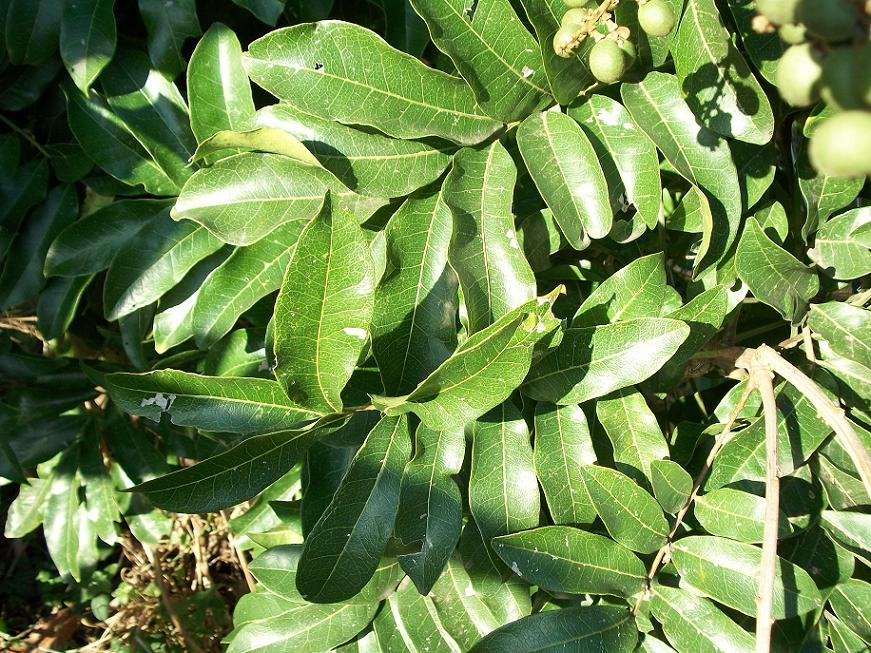
Compound leaves

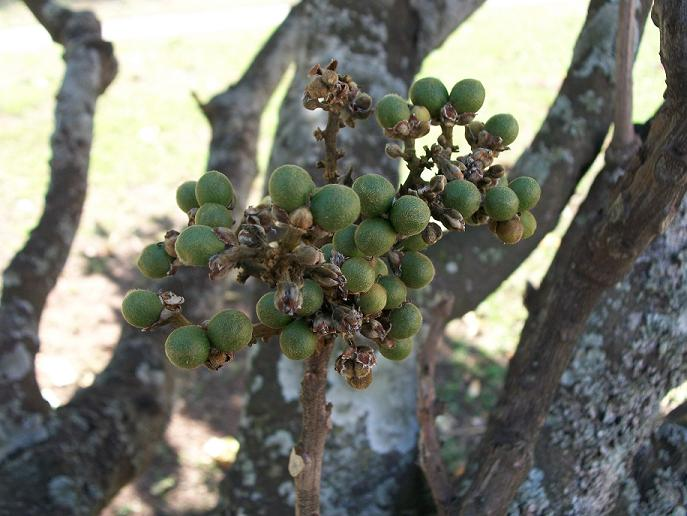
Fruit and branches

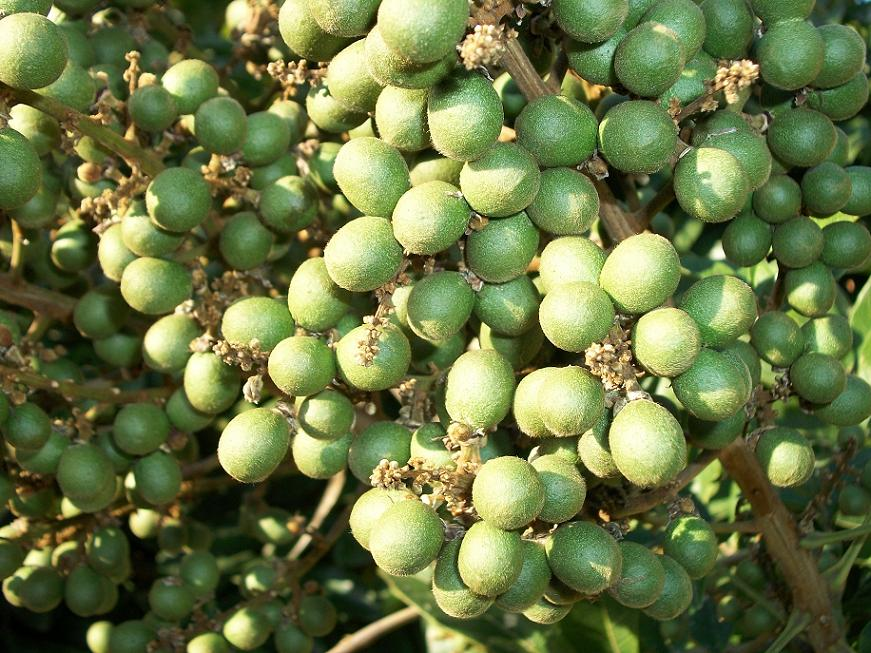
Green fruit

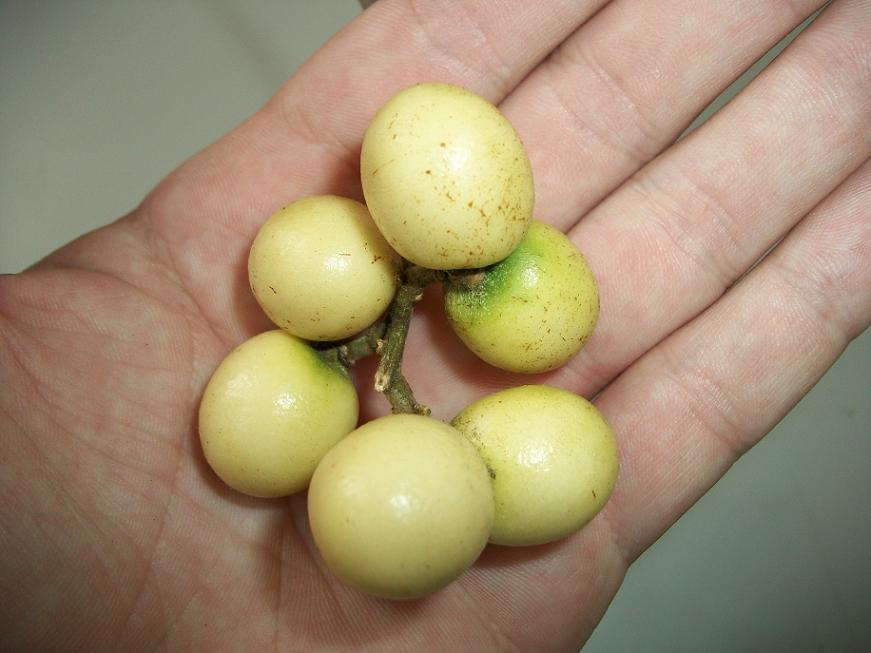
Ripe fruit

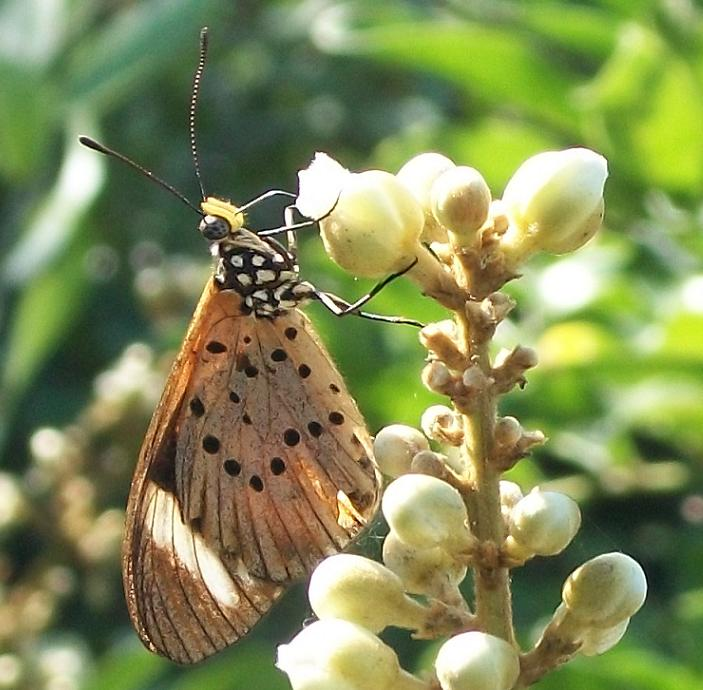
Telchinia encedon on flowers of Deinbollia oblongifolia

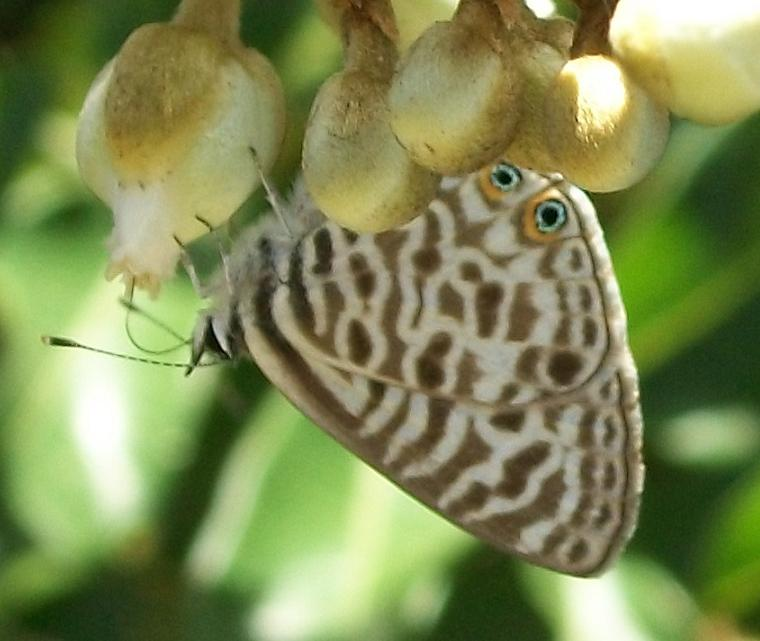
Leptotes pirithous on the flowers

== See also ==
- KwaZulu-Natal Dune Forest
- KwaZulu-Natal Coastal Lowland Forest
- Maputaland-Pondoland-Albany Hotspot
