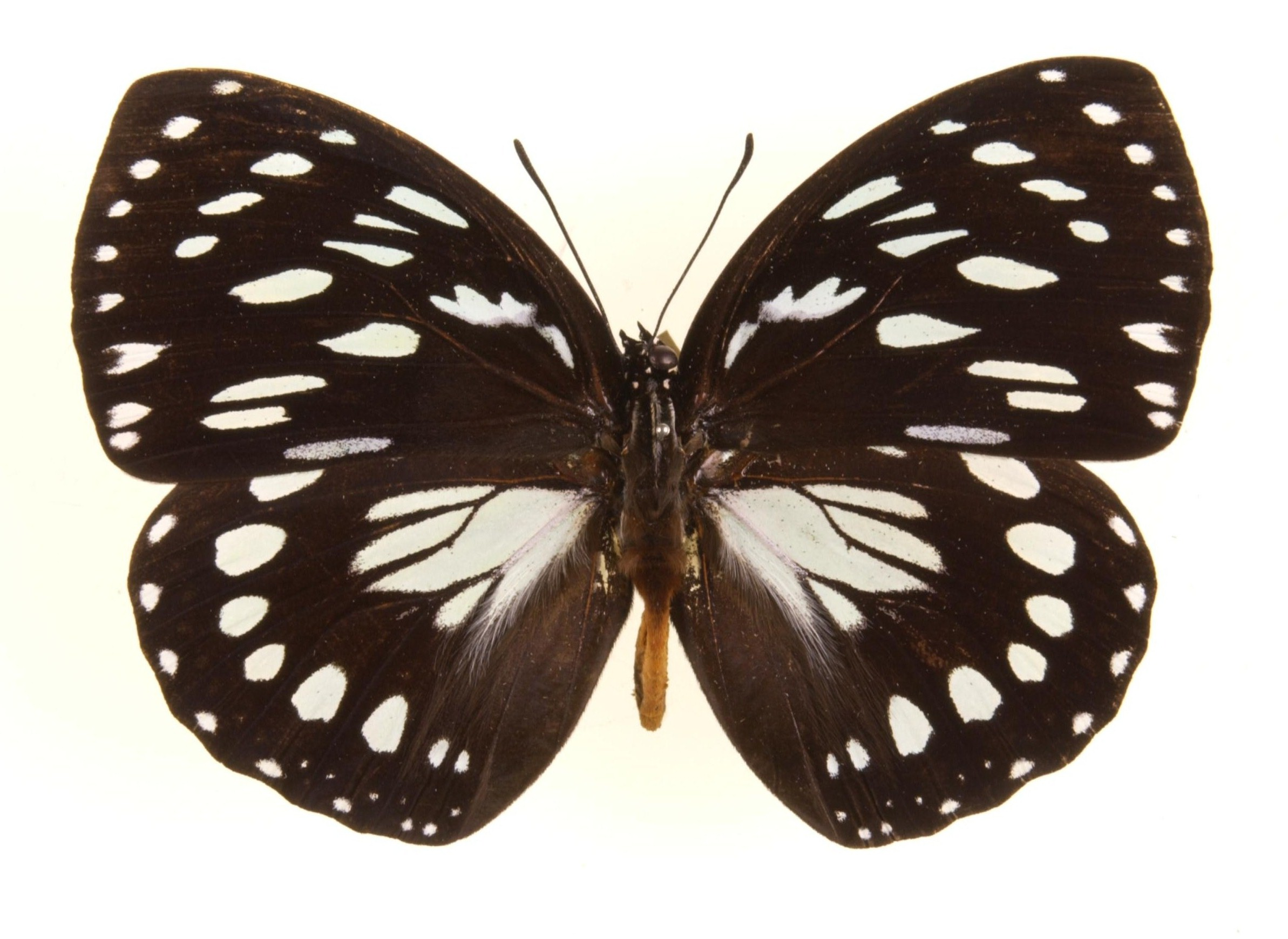
- Euxanthe eurinome

Scientific classification
- Kingdom: Animalia
- Phylum: Arthropoda
- Clade: Pancrustacea
- Class: Insecta
- Order: Lepidoptera
- Family: Nymphalidae
- Subfamily: Charaxinae
- Tribe: Euxanthini; Rydon, 1971
- Genus: Euxanthe; Hübner, [1819]

Synonyms
- Godartia Lucas, 1843; Anthora Doubleday, 1844; Hypomelaena Aurivillius, 1898

= Euxanthe =

Genus of brush-footed butterflies

Euxanthe is a genus of butterflies in the subfamily Charaxinae. There are six species all found in Afrotropical forests. The popular name is empresses or forest queens.

== Species ==
The six species are:

- Subgenus Euxanthe Hübner, [1819] / eurinome-group
  - Euxanthe crossleyi (Ward, 1871)
  - Euxanthe eurinome (Cramer, [1775])
  - Euxanthe madagascariensis (Lucas, 1843)
  - Euxanthe wakefieldi (Ward, 1873)
- Subgenus Hypomelaena Aurivillius, [1898] / tiberius-group
  - Euxanthe tiberius Grose-Smith, 1889
  - Euxanthe trajanus (Ward, 1871)
