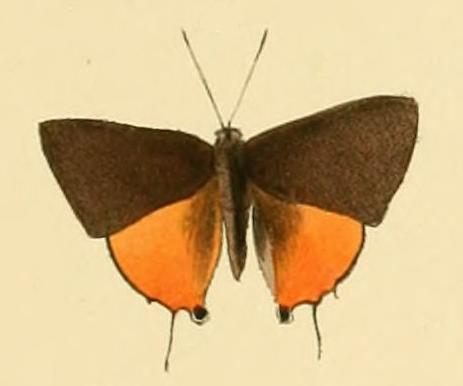

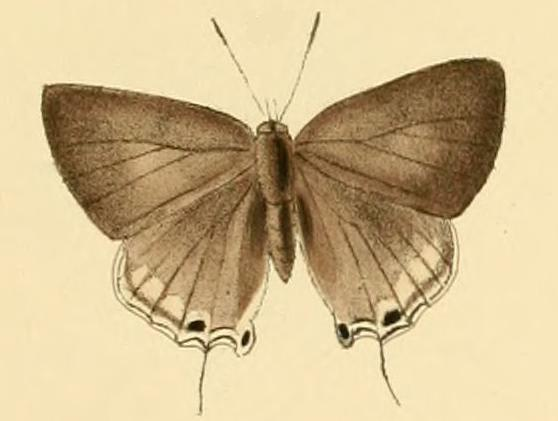

Scientific classification
- Kingdom: Animalia
- Phylum: Arthropoda
- Class: Insecta
- Order: Lepidoptera
- Family: Lycaenidae
- Genus: Deudorix
- Species: D. dariaves

Binomial name
- Deudorix dariaves Hewitson, 1877

Synonyms
- Virachola dariaves; Deudorix (Virachola) dariaves

= Deudorix dariaves =

Black-and-orange playboy

Species of butterfly

Deudorix dariaves, the black-and-orange playboy, is a butterfly of the family Lycaenidae. It is found from South Africa to Mozambique and to the coast of Kenya. In South Africa it is found along the coast of KwaZulu-Natal and north along the escarpment foothill forests to Mpumalanga and Limpopo.

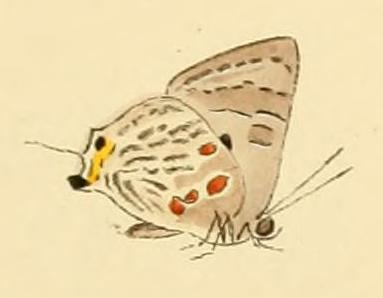

The wingspan is 23–25 mm for males and 28–33 mm for females. Adults are on wing year-round with peaks in September and from April to June.

The larvae feed on the fruit of Deinbollia oblongifolia and Hyperacanthus amoenus. It has also been recorded on Brachystegia and Coffea species
