= Mimusops penduliflora =

Conservation status
- Endangered (IUCN 2.3)

Scientific classification
- Kingdom: Plantae
- Clade: Tracheophytes
- Clade: Angiosperms
- Clade: Eudicots
- Clade: Asterids
- Order: Ericales
- Family: Sapotaceae
- Genus: Mimusops
- Species: M. penduliflora

Binomial name
- Mimusops penduliflora Engl.

Species of flowering plant

Mimusops penduliflora is a species of plant in the family Sapotaceae. It is endemic to Tanzania.
