= Peter Vogelius Deinboll =

Norwegian politician

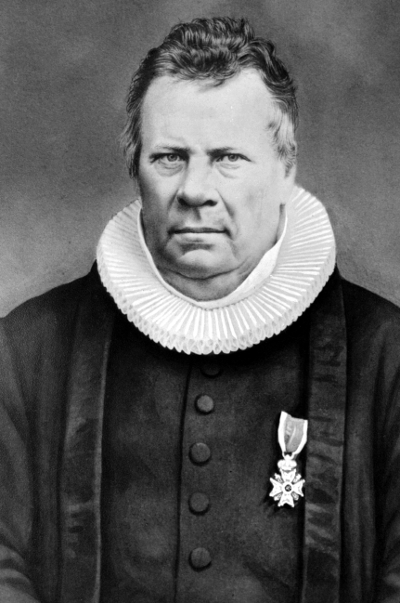
- Born: 8 January 1783
- Died: 13 May 1874 (aged 91)
- Occupations: Botanist, entomologist, and politician

Peter Vogelius Deinboll (8 January 1783 Copenhagen – 13 May 1874 Aker, Norway) was a Danish-Norwegian priest, parliamentary representative and entomologist. He was the son of Christian Deinboll and Karen Christiane Holm, and lived most of his adult life in Norway, serving as a vicar in East Finnmark and later at Løten in Hedmark. He married Anna Marie Dorthea Deinboll and they raised a son August Thorvald Deinboll.

His interest in politics led him to the Storting as representative of Finnmark for the terms 1821 and 1824. For his considerable contributions to science and politics, he was made a knight of the Order of St. Olav.

The standard author abbreviation Deinboll is used to indicate this person as the author when citing a botanical name.

He was honoured in 1827, when botanists Schumach. & Thonn. named a genus of plants Deinbollia after him.
