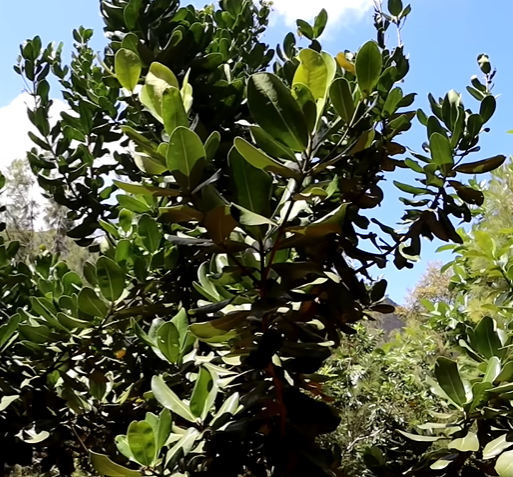

Conservation status
- Least Concern (IUCN 3.1)

Scientific classification
- Kingdom: Plantae
- Clade: Tracheophytes
- Clade: Angiosperms
- Clade: Eudicots
- Clade: Asterids
- Order: Ericales
- Family: Sapotaceae
- Genus: Mimusops
- Species: M. coriacea

Binomial name
- Mimusops coriacea (A.DC.) Miq.

Synonyms
- Imbricaria coriacea A.DC.; Mimusops dissecta Buch.-Ham. ex A.DC.; Phlebolithis indica Gaertn.

= Mimusops coriacea =

Species of plant

Mimusops coriacea, the monkey's apple, is a plant in the family Sapotaceae, native to Madagascar and the Comoros.

== Description ==
Mimusops coriacea is a tropical evergreen fruit-bearing shrub growing up to 6 m (20 ft) tall. The bole can be up to 30 cm (12 in) in diameter. The round, bright yellow edible fruits range around 6–8 cm (2–3 in) wide.

== Distribution and habitat ==
Mimusops coriacea is native to Madagascar and the Comoros, where it is found in seaside sand dunes as well as in shoreline forests. It is also cultivated in botanical gardens for ornamental purposes. It has been introduced to other Indian Ocean islands including Mauritius, Seychelles, Réunion and the Chagos Archipelago.
