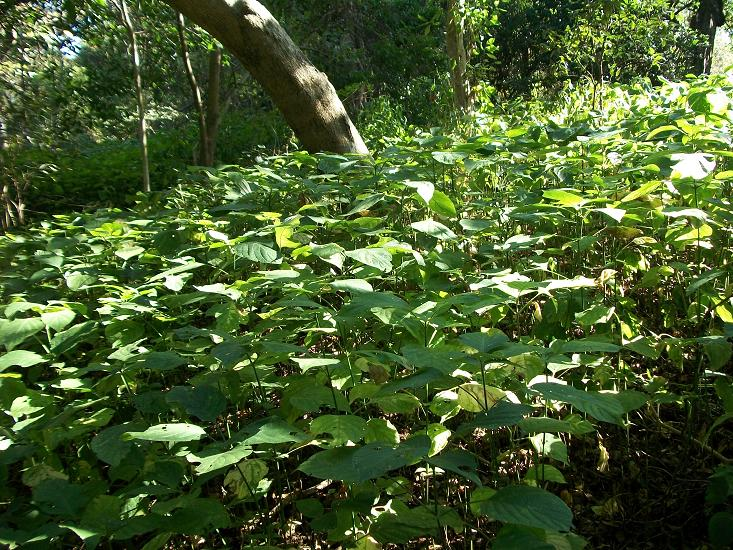
- A dense stand of Isoglossa woodii

Scientific classification
- Kingdom: Plantae
- Clade: Tracheophytes
- Clade: Angiosperms
- Clade: Eudicots
- Clade: Asterids
- Order: Lamiales
- Family: Acanthaceae
- Genus: Isoglossa
- Species: I. woodii

Binomial name
- Isoglossa woodii C.B. Clarke

= Isoglossa woodii =

Species of shrub

Isoglossa woodii, commonly known as buckweed, is a monocarpic shrub of the family Acanthaceae, growing up to 4 m tall. It grows in colonies in coastal forest areas of KwaZulu-Natal and marginally into Eastern Cape and Free State of South Africa.

== Description ==
The stem is often multi branched and sparsely hairy, with lower stems becoming woody. The leaves are between 75 mm and 120 mm long, and are soft and often droop during dry conditions. The leaves have a velvety texture due to fine, dense hairs on the surface. These plants have a life cycle of about 7 to 10 years, after which they flower en masse and then die off. The flowers are produced in inflorescences and individual flowers are whitish in colour and about 8 mm in length.

== Ecological significance ==
These plants form dense colonies in the understorey of forests where they provide food and shelter to many animals. Blue duiker and bushbuck feed on the leaves and shoots. The flowers attract many species of insects, and honey is said to be plentiful in years when these plants flower. Buckweed is excluded from areas of forest with dense tree cover and in turn plays a role in limiting forest regeneration as the tree seedling community beneath Isoglossa woodii shows reduced density and species richness from areas where I. woodii is absent. Butterfly larvae of Protogoniomorpha parhassus and Celaenorrhinus mokeezi are known to feed on the leaves of Isoglossa.

== Etymology ==
This plant was named after John Medley Wood (hence woodii). The common name of buckweed is a reference to these plants being abundant and being browsed by forest antelopes.

== Historical note ==
John Medley Wood noted that "This plant does not flower every year; it is commonly believed to flower once in seven years only; this year, 1888, it has produced flowers in great abundance".

== Gallery ==
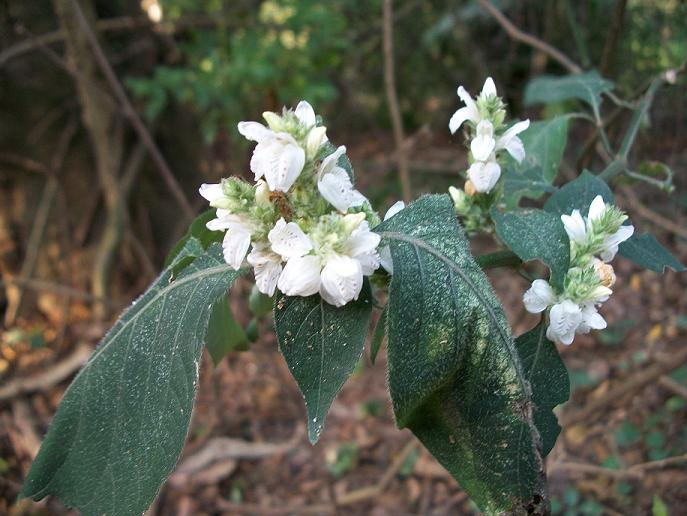
flowering Isoglossa woodii

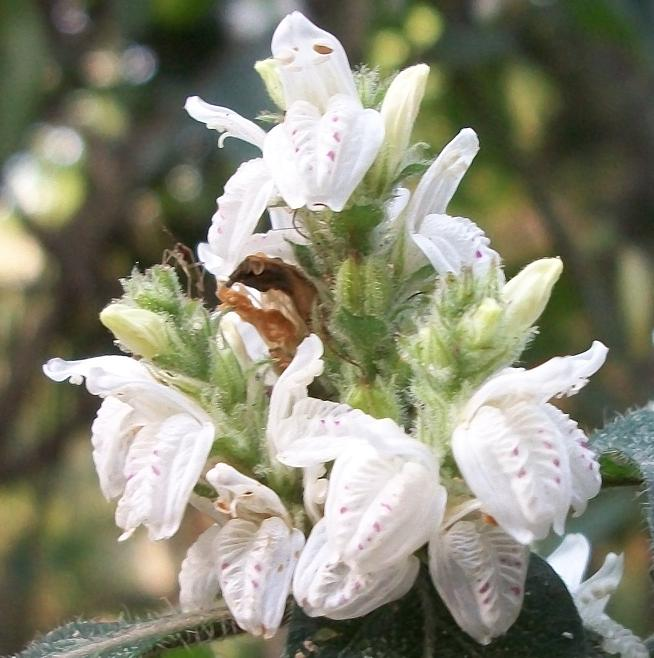
close-up of the flowers

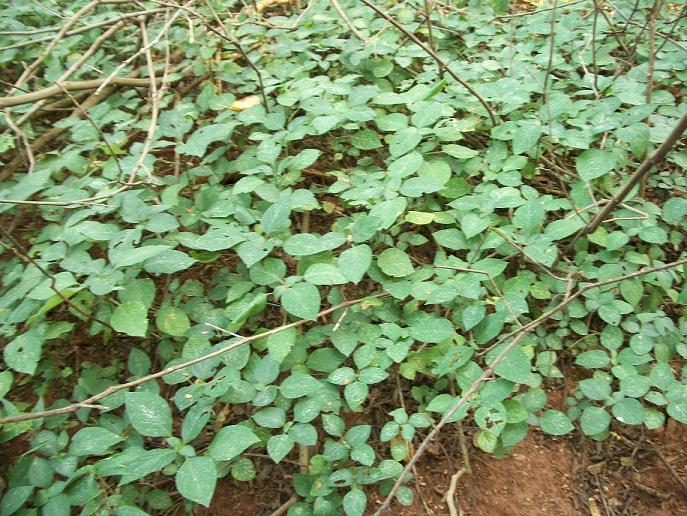
seedlings and old stalks of I. woodii

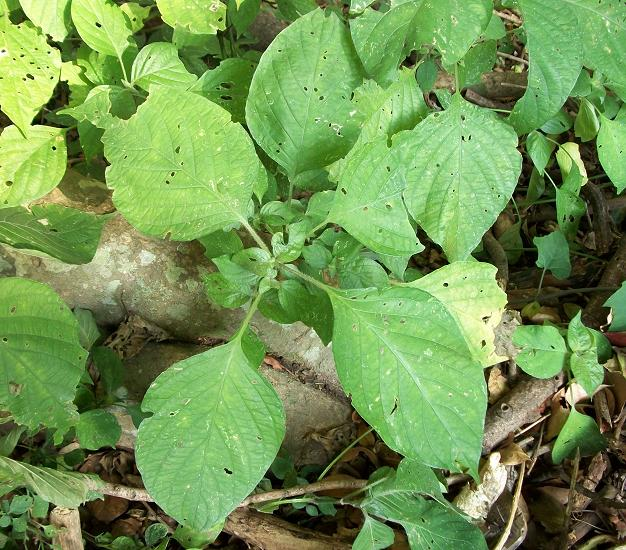
close-up of the seedlings

== See also ==
- Forests of KwaZulu-Natal
- Maputaland-Pondoland-Albany Hotspot

== Bibliography ==
- Pooley, E. (1998). A Field Guide to Wild Flowers; KwaZulu-Natal and the Eastern Region. ISBN 0-620-21500-3.
