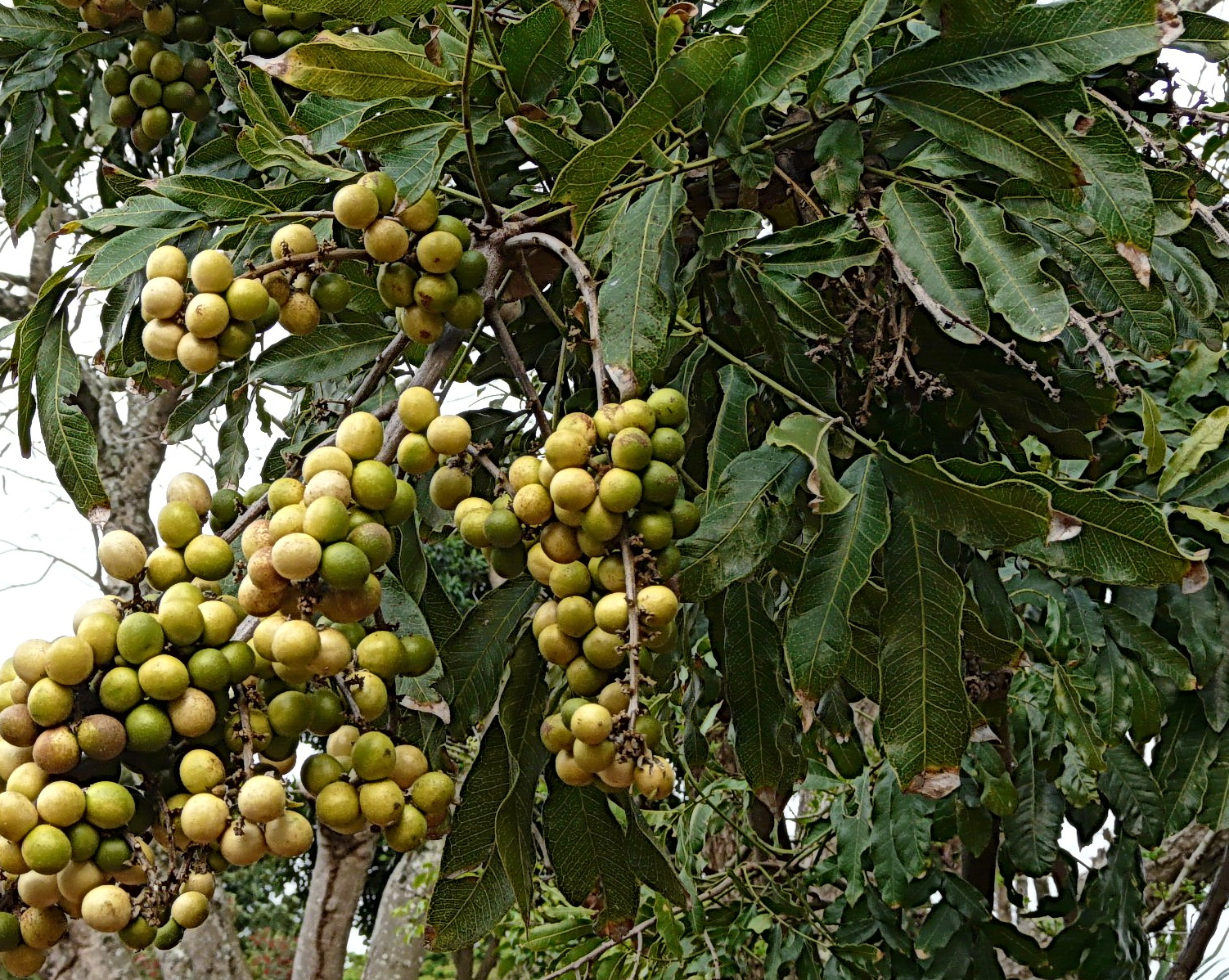
- Deinbollia oblongifolia in South Africa

Scientific classification
- Kingdom: Plantae
- Clade: Tracheophytes
- Clade: Angiosperms
- Clade: Eudicots
- Clade: Rosids
- Order: Sapindales
- Family: Sapindaceae
- Subfamily: Sapindoideae
- Genus: Deinbollia; Schumach. & Thonn.

= Deinbollia =

Genus of plants

Deinbollia is a genus of flowering plants belonging to the family Sapindaceae.

Its native range is tropical and Southern Africa and islands in the western Indian Ocean.

Its genus name of Deinbollia is in honour of Peter Vogelius Deinboll (1783–1874), a Danish-Norwegian priest, parliamentary representative and entomologist.

Known species:

- Deinbollia acuminata Exell
- Deinbollia angustifolia D.W.Thomas
- Deinbollia boinensis Capuron
- Deinbollia borbonica Scheff.
- Deinbollia calophylla Gilg & Dinkl. ex Radlk.
- Deinbollia cauliflora Hauman
- Deinbollia crassipes Hauman
- Deinbollia cuneifolia Baker
- Deinbollia dasybotrys Gilg ex Radlk.
- Deinbollia evrardii Hauman
- Deinbollia fanshawei Exell
- Deinbollia fulvotomentella Baker f.
- Deinbollia gossweileri Exell
- Deinbollia grandifolia Hook.f.
- Deinbollia hierniana Gilg
- Deinbollia insignis Hook.f.
- Deinbollia kilimandscharica Taub.
- Deinbollia laurentii De Wild.
- Deinbollia laurifolia Baker
- Deinbollia longiacuminata Hauman
- Deinbollia macrantha Radlk.
- Deinbollia macrocarpa Capuron
- Deinbollia macroura Gilg ex Radlk.
- Deinbollia maxima Gilg ex Engl.
- Deinbollia mezilii D.W.Thomas & D.J.Harris
- Deinbollia neglecta Radlk.
- Deinbollia nyasica Exell
- Deinbollia oblongifolia (E.Mey. ex Arn.) Radlk.
- Deinbollia oreophila Cheek
- Deinbollia pervillei (Blume) Radlk.
- Deinbollia pinnata (Poir.) Schumach. & Thonn.
- Deinbollia pycnophylla Gilg ex Engl.
- Deinbollia pynaertii De Wild.
- Deinbollia rambaensis Pellegr.
- Deinbollia reticulata Gilg ex Engl.
- Deinbollia revoluta Radlk.
- Deinbollia saligna Keay
- Deinbollia unijuga D.W.Thomas
- Deinbollia xanthocarpa (Klotzsch) Radlk.
