= Opisthopatus camdebooi =

Scientific classification
- Kingdom: Animalia
- Phylum: Onychophora
- Family: Peripatopsidae
- Genus: Opisthopatus
- Species: O. camdebooi

Binomial name
- Opisthopatus camdebooi Barnes & Daniels, 2022

Species of basal Peripatopsid velvet worm

Opisthopatus camdebooi is a species of velvet worm in the family Peripatopsidae. Also known as the Camdeboo velvet worm, this species is endemic to the Camdeboo National Park in South Africa. This species is notable for adapting to an unlikely environment for the survival of velvet worms. This species was found in soil 30 cm beneath the surface in the Valley of Desolation in Camdeboo National Park in the Great Karoo, an arid region devoid of forests. Over millions of years, this velvet worm apparently adapted to an increasingly arid Karoo basin by taking refuge at higher altitudes and adopting a mode of life underground but near the surface. This species is the first velvet worm discovered in South Africa with such a near-surface mode of life.

== Discovery ==
This velvet worm was first identified as a distinct lineage by a phylogenetic analysis using molecular data in 2016, based on four specimens collected from the Valley of Desolation in Camdeboo National Park, near the town of Graaff-Reinet in the Eastern Cape province of South Africa. After the first four specimens were lost, the zoologists Aaron Barnes and Savel R. Daniels of Stellenbosch University collected eight more specimens from the Valley of Desolation for analysis using molecular data and scanning electron microscopy. They described O. camdebooi as a new species in 2022 based on a male holotype, a male paratype, and four female specimens, all found in 2021 on top of the lookout area in the Valley of Desolation. The holotype is deposited in the entomological collection of the South African Museum in Cape Town.

== Habitat ==
Barnes and Daniels found their specimens in soil and among small rocks at the base of a dead tree in a deep gorge, in the shadow of dolerite boulders 30 m tall. Leaf litter covers the boulders in this gorge, where the environment is cool. Most specimens were found at least 30 cm below the surface in soil between rocks; others were found in leaf litter in boulder caves. The Valley of Desolation is devoid of forests, but the dolerite pillars there are 120 m tall and covered with moss. The surrounding low-lying habitat of the Karoo basin is dominated by arid shrublands.

== Phylogeny ==
A phylogenetic analysis of the genus Opisthopatus using molecular data places this species in a clade with three other species in this genus, O. baziya, O. amaxhosa, and O. kwazululandi. These three species form a sister group, emerging as the three closest relatives of O. camdebooi. The data suggest that the species O. camdebooi diverged from this sister group an estimated 17.08 million years ago in the Early Miocene.

== Description ==
This species features 16 pairs of legs in each sex. The dorsal surface of this species is light pink, both in living specimens and in specimens preserved in absolute ethanol. The ventral surface ranges from off-white to light pink when preserved in absolute ethanol. The male specimens range from 15 mm to 18 mm in length and from 2.0 mm to 2.5 mm in width. The female specimens range from 12 mm to 14 mm in length and from 1.9 mm to 2.3 mm in width.

The eyes are sunken and lack pigment. These distinctive eyes appear to be an adaption to life underground. The head features a distinct dorsal cleft between the antennae. Each of the antennae features 23 rings. The genital opening in males is cruciform; the genital opening in females takes the form of a small vertical slit with swollen lips. The primary dermal papillae are moderately spaced. The dorsal papillae feature five scale ranks and are conical or shaped like domes. The ventral papillae are conical with four scale ranks.

This velvet worm shares many traits with other species in the genus Opisthopatus, including the dorsal cleft on the head, the cruciform genital opening in males, and the longitudinal genital opening in females. Other traits, however, distinguish this species from its closest relatives. For example, the eyes in this species are sunken, but in closely related species such as O. baziya and O. amaxhosa, the eyes are pronounced and distinctly convex. Furthermore, the dorsal papillae in O. camdebooi feature only five scale ranks, unlike these papillae in its close relatives O. baziya (with eight scale ranks), O. amaxhosa (with six scale ranks), and O. kwazululandi (with seven to nine scale ranks).
