= Forests of KwaZulu-Natal =

Forest vegetation type in South Africa

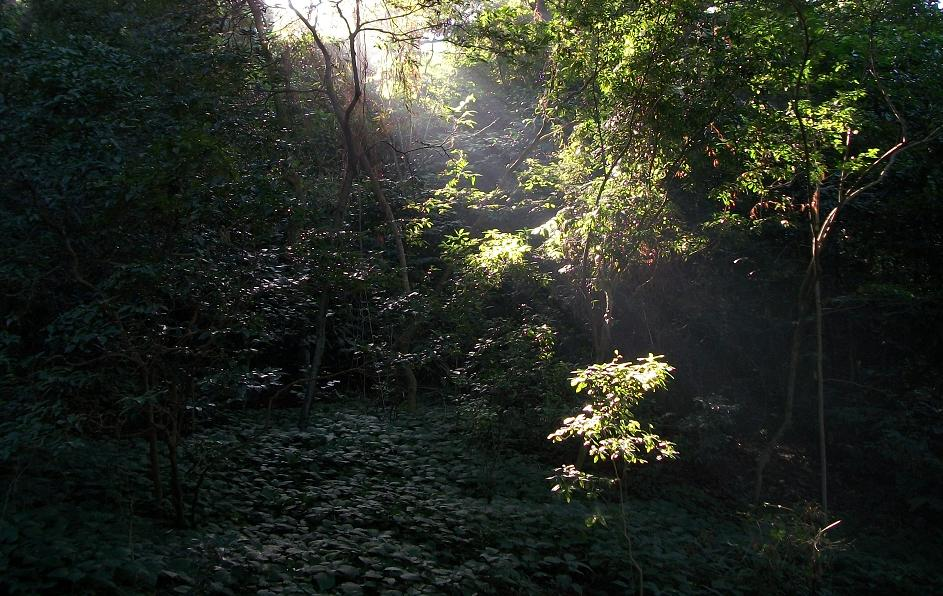
Forest at Pigeon Valley

Areas of forest which grow in KwaZulu-Natal, South Africa mostly on south facing slopes in higher rainfall areas, and along the humid coastal areas. Different types of forest can be identified by their species composition which depends mostly on the altitude, latitude and substrate (soil and rock types) in which they grow. South facing slopes are favourable for the development of forest as they are more shaded, and therefore cooler and retain more moisture than the northern slopes. The extra moisture on the south slopes is not only favoured by forest trees, but also helps to prevent or subdue wildfires. Fires can also be blocked by cliff faces and rocks or boulders on these slopes, and by streams or rivers at the base of the slopes. The coastal regions are conducive to forest formation, because of high rainfall and humidity which are favoured by forest trees and also help to prevent or subdue fires. The rivers of the coastal areas are also broader than further inland, which may often prevent fires from spreading long distances, and fires generally burn uphill and therefore more often away from areas at low altitude.

== Forest types ==
Various forest types can be distinguished, but many of these overlap or integrate with each other for example; coastal dune forest can fade into coastal lowland forest, which can in turn fade into riverine forest.

=== Montane forest ===
Found in secluded valleys in the Drakensberg area. Characteristic tree species include yellowwoods (Afrocarpus falcatus and Podocarpus latifolius), mountain hard pear (Olinia emarginata) and Cape beech (Rapanea melanophloeos). Mountain cypress (Widdringtonia nodiflora) may occur on the forest margins.

=== Mistbelt forest ===
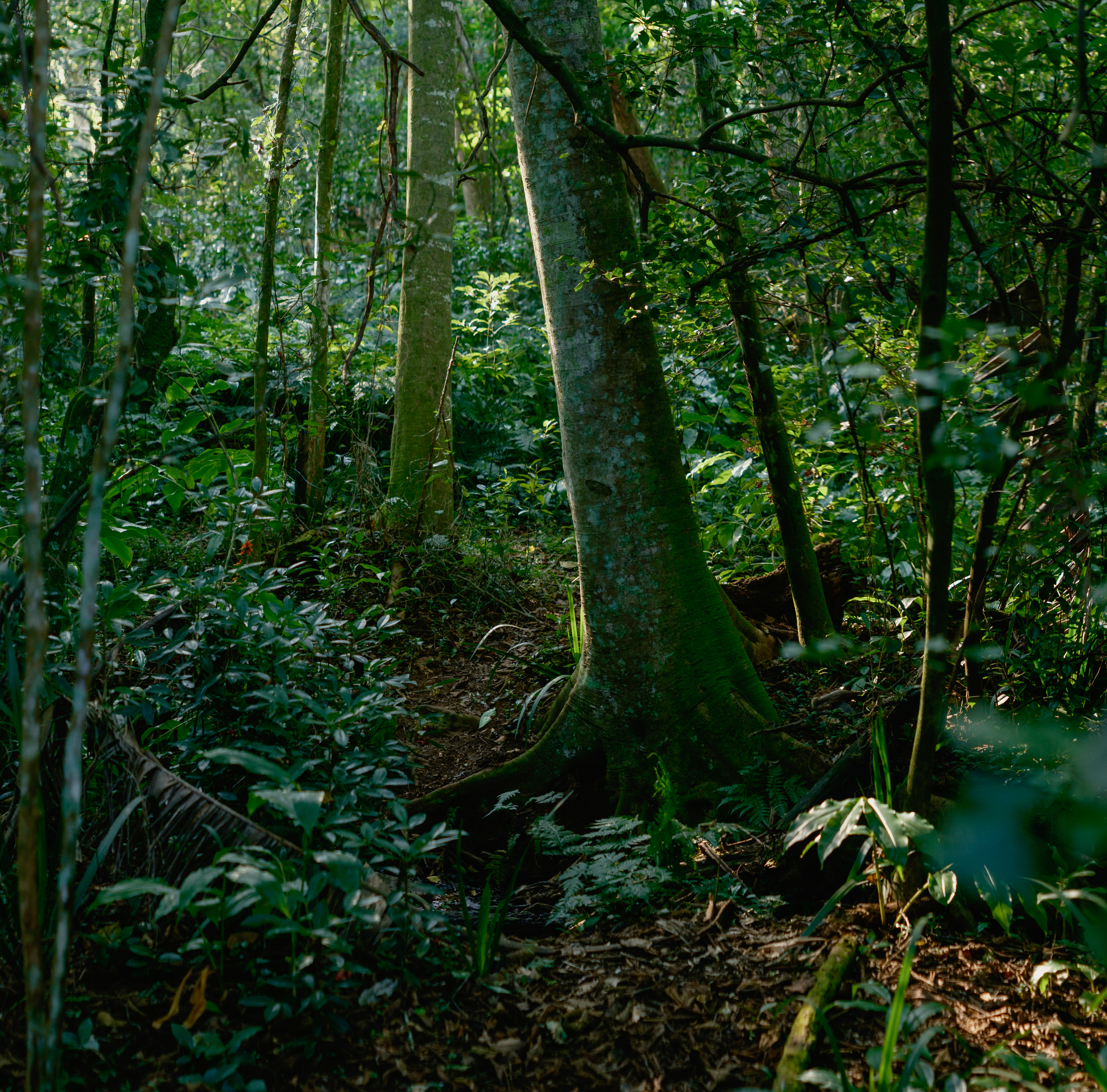
Mistbelt Forest at Ipithi Nature Reserve

Found in secluded valleys in the KwaZulu-Natal Midlands. Characteristic trees are; yellowwoods (including Afrocarpus falcatus, Podocarpus latifolius and Podocarpus henkelii), Natal krantz ash (Atalaya natalensis), red stinkwood (Prunus africana), sneezewood (Ptaeroxylon obliquum) and forest elder (Nuxia floribunda). The forest tree fern (Cyathea capensis) is also found in these forests.

=== Coastal scarp forest ===
This type is found on slopes and in secluded valleys between the coast and the Mistbelt. Trees include: white stinkwood (Celtis africana), forest bushwillow (Combretum krausii) and umzimbeet (Millettia grandis). The Natal cycad (Encephalartos natalensis) may occur on the forest edges, usually among rocks.

=== Coastal lowland forest ===
Once found almost continuously along the KwaZulu-Natal coast. Trees found here include; flat-crown (Albizia adianthifolia), coastal goldenleaf (Bridelia micrantha), red beech (Protorhus longifolia), forest mahogany (Trichilia dregeana), forest fever-berry (Croton sylvaticus) and wild date palm (Phoenix reclinata).

=== Sand forest ===
Found on ancient inland sand dunes in Maputaland in the north of KwaZulu-Natal. Unique trees include Lebombo wattle (Newtonia hildebrandtii), red-heart tree (Hymenocardia ulmoides), lavender-leaved croton (Croton pseudopulchellus) and stink bushwillow (Pteleopsis myrtifolia).

=== Dune forest ===
Once found almost continuously along the coastal dunes of KwaZulu-Natal. Characteristic trees are: coastal red milkwood (Mimusops afra), coast silver oak (Brachylaena discolor), dune soap-berry (Deinbollia oblongifolia) and Natal wild banana (Strelitzia nicolai). The large-leaved dragon tree (Dracaena aletriformis) is also found here.

=== Riverine forest ===
This forest type occurs along natural waterways, even in dry areas that would not normally support forest. Trees found here include; Ficus sycomorus, Ficus polita, quinine tree (Rauvolfia afra) and fever tree (Acacia xanthophloea). These forests are vulnerable to flooding and many were destroyed by Cyclone Domoina.

=== Swamp forest ===
Found around the edges of lowland lakes and streams. Various fig trees are found here including Ficus sur and Ficus trichopoda, as well as the wild swamp poplar (Macaranga capensis). The water fig (Ficus verruculosa) and Kosi palm (Raphia australis) are characteristic species in Maputaland.

=== Mangrove forest ===
Occurs in favourable tidal estuaries along the coast. Species include the black mangrove (Bruguiera gymnorhiza), red mangrove (Rhizophora mucronata) and white mangrove (Avicennia marina). The powder-puff tree (Barringtonia racemosa) and the wild cotton tree (Hibiscus tiliaceus) are sometimes classed as mangrove trees, but grow mostly along estuaries that are less tidal. They may form a transition zone between mangrove forest and swamp forest.

== List of forests in KwaZulu-Natal ==
- Dhlinza Forest
- Entumeni Forest
- Gilboa Forest
- Hawaan Forest
- Hlabeni Forest
- Hlatikhulu Forest
- Karkloof Forest
- Ngome Forest
- Nkandla Forest
- Ongoye Forest
- Qudeni Forest
- Sileza Forest
- Soada Forest
- Tuduma Forest
- Umgano Forest
- Weza Forest
- Xalingena Forest

== Additional areas with significant forest ==
- Amatikulu Nature Reserve
- Empisini Nature Reserve
- Enseleni Nature Reserve
- iSimangaliso Wetland Park
- Kenneth Stainbank Nature Reserve
- Krantzkloof Nature Reserve
- Mbumbazi Nature Reserve
- Oribi Gorge Nature Reserve
- Tembe Elephant Park
- Tshanini Nature Reserve
- Umlalazi Nature Reserve
- Umtamvuna Nature Reserve
- Vernon Crookes Nature Reserve

== Forest animals ==
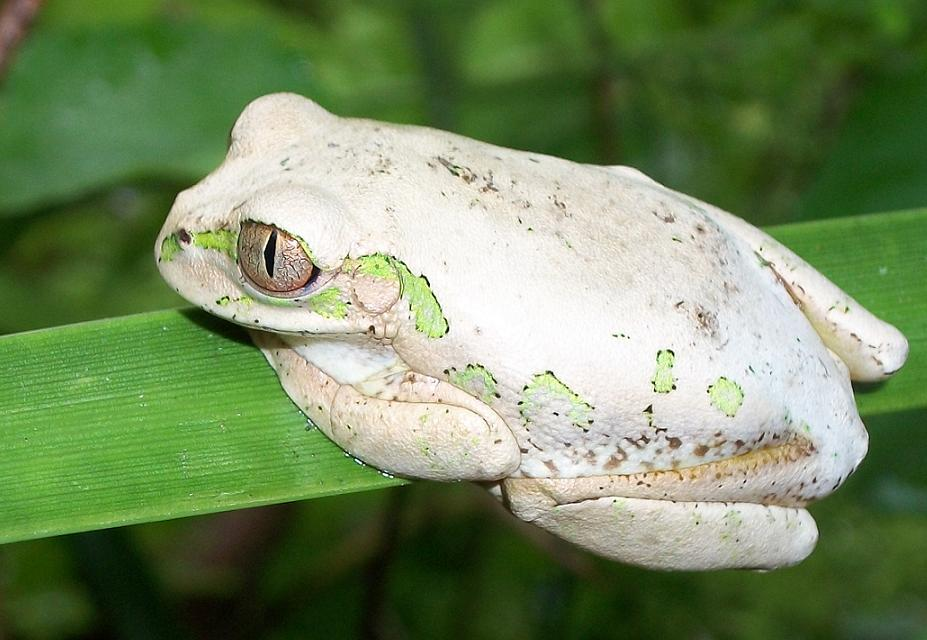
Natal forest tree frog

Several animals are adapted to living in these forests. Many are locally adapted subspecies of animals found further north in Tropical Africa, such as the blue duiker and Samango monkey, but some are local endemic species like the dwarf chameleons (Bradypodion spp.), Natal forest tree frog and bush squeaker frog.

Birds:

Narina trogon (Apaloderma narina), purple-crested turaco (Tauraco porphyreolophus), forest weaver (Ploceus bicolor), crowned eagle (Stephanoaetus coronatus), spotted ground-thrush (Zoothera guttata), orange thrush (Zoothera gurneyi) and Delegorgue's pigeon (Columba delegorguei).

Mammals:

Blue duiker, red duiker, bushbuck, nyala, bushpig, leopard and Samango monkey.

Reptiles:

Eastern green mamba, forest cobra and Gaboon adder.

== Herbaceous plants ==
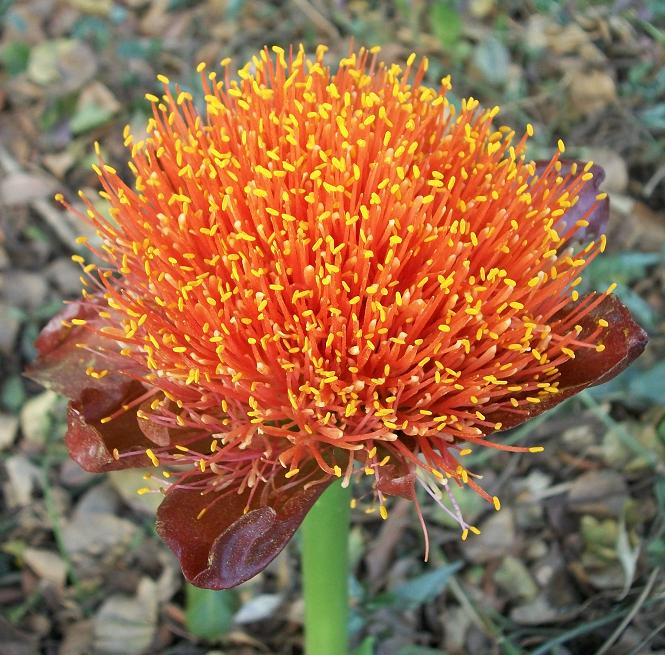
Scadoxus puniceus produces flowers in late winter in the forests of KwaZulu-Natal

A wide range of herbaceous plants are found in the forests, either as ground cover or in the trees as epiphytes. Various lianas and climbers are also common plants in these forests.

Herbaceous ground plants:

Bush lily (Clivia miniata), blood lily (Scadoxus puniceus), mother-in-law's-tongue (Sanseveria hyacinthoides), white paintbrush (Haemanthus albiflos), forest commelina (Coleotrype natalensis), small chlorophytum (Chlorophytum modestum), buckweed (Isoglossa woodii), many species of Plectranthus including Plectranthus ambiguus, Plectranthus ecklonii, and Plectranthus fruticosus. Non-flowering plants include; the ground cycad (Encephalartos villosus), stangeria cycad (Stangeria eriopus) and various mosses and ferns. Some grasses also grow in open forest and glades such as basket grass (Oplismenus hirtellus), broad-leaved panicum (Panicum deustum) and broad-leaved bristle grass (Setaria megaphylla).

Epiphytes:

Matches mistletoe (Tapinanthus kraussianus), hairy-lipped polystachya (Polystachya pubescens), leopard orchid (Ansellia africana), other orchids such as; Mystacidium capense, Mystacidium venosum, Polystachya ottoniana, Angraecum conchiferum, Cyrtorchis arcuata and Diaphananthe afra. Mosses and ferns may also grow as epiphytes.

Climbers:

Black-eyed susan (Thunbergia alata), wild cucumber (Coccinia palmata), climbing bamboo (Flagellaria guineensis) and flame lily (Gloriosa superba).

== Economic importance ==
Coastal scarp and mistbelt forests were the main source of timber in South Africa before the advent of exotic timber plantations. Giant yellowwoods and stinkwoods were the most sought-after trees. Most of the larger forests are now protected, but some small scale timber extraction by local communities still takes place. Attempts to grow indigenous trees as timber plantations have so far proven economically unviable compared to exotics, but more research is needed. A promising species is the fast-growing Trema orientalis which is appropriate for paper and pulp production; producing paper with good tensile strength and folding endurance. Another species for closer study is Celtis africana, which is fast-growing and can be used for furniture and panelling. Both of these species could be used as cover for slower-growing forest hardwoods which could be interplanted for more long-term production of more valuable timber.

Forests have been a source of medicinal plants for hundreds of years. It is estimated that more than 2100 tonnes of medicinal plants are extracted from forest areas in KwaZulu-Natal each year, which is projected to be unsustainable.

Eco-tourism is the most viable and sustainable option for the forests of Kwazulu-Natal, and several government, private and non-government projects to ensure this are underway or in the planning stages.

== See also ==
- Estuaries in South Africa
- KwaZulu-Cape coastal forest mosaic
- Maputaland coastal forest mosaic
- Maputaland-Pondoland bushland and thickets

== Bibliography ==
- Argent, S. and Loedolff, J. (1997). Discovering Indigenous Forests at Kirstenbosch. ISBN 1-919713-12-3
- Carruthers, V. (2001). Sasol First Field Guide to Frogs. ISBN 978-1-86872-595-3
- Pooley, E. (1993). The Complete Field Guide to Trees of Natal, Zululand and Transkei. ISBN 0-620-17697-0.
- Pooley, E. (1998). A Field Guide to Wild Flowers; KwaZulu-Natal and the Eastern Region. ISBN 0-620-21500-3.
- Pooley, T. and Player, I. (1995). KwaZulu-Natal Wildlife Destinations. ISBN 1-86812-487-8.
- van Oudtshoorn, F. (1992). Guide to Grasses of South Africa. ISBN 0-620-16539-1.
