= Opisthopatus swatii =

Scientific classification
- Kingdom: Animalia
- Phylum: Onychophora
- Family: Peripatopsidae
- Genus: Opisthopatus
- Species: O. swatii

Binomial name
- Opisthopatus swatii Daniels et al., 2016

Species of basal Peripatopsid velvet worm

Opisthopatus swatii is a species of velvet worm in the family Peripatidae. This species is a clade in the O. cinctipes species complex. This species has 16 pairs of legs, and the color of the dorsal surface ranges from blue to slate black, while the ventral surface ranges from light brown to creamy white. The original description of this species is based on male holotypes ranging from 13 mm to 20 mm in length. Also known as the Swati velvet worm, this species is found in indigenous forest patches along the Highveld in Mpumalanga province in South Africa.
