= Opisthopatus amatolensis =

Scientific classification
- Kingdom: Animalia
- Phylum: Onychophora
- Family: Peripatopsidae
- Genus: Opisthopatus
- Species: O. amatolensis

Binomial name
- Opisthopatus amatolensis Choonoo, 1947

Synonyms
- Opisthopatus cinctipes var. amatolensis (Choonoo, 1947)

Species of basal Peripatopsid velvet worm

Opisthopatus amatolensis is a species of velvet worm in the Peripatopsidae family. This species has 16 pairs of legs. The type locality is in South Africa. The validity of this species is uncertain: Although some authorities deem O. amatolensis to be invalid even as a subspecies of O. cinctipes, a similar species also found in South Africa, other authorities recognize O. amatolensis as a separate species, citing the significant distance (161 km) between the type localities of these two species.
