= Opisthopatus highveldi =

Scientific classification
- Kingdom: Animalia
- Phylum: Onychophora
- Family: Peripatopsidae
- Genus: Opisthopatus
- Species: O. highveldi

Binomial name
- Opisthopatus highveldi Daniels et al., 2016

Species of basal Peripatopsid velvet worm

Opisthopatus highveldi is a species of velvet worm in the family Peripatopsidae. This species is a clade in the O. cinctipes species complex. This species has 16 pairs of legs and varies in color from brown to black to indigo. The original description of this species is based on two holotypes ranging from 16 mm to 17 mm in length. Also known as the Highveld velvet worm, this species is found in indigenous forest patches along the Highveld in Mpumalanga province in South Africa.
