= Opisthopatus drakensbergi =

Scientific classification
- Kingdom: Animalia
- Phylum: Onychophora
- Family: Peripatopsidae
- Genus: Opisthopatus
- Species: O. drakensbergi

Binomial name
- Opisthopatus drakensbergi Daniels et al., 2016

Species of basal Peripatopsid velvet worm

Opisthopatus drakensbergi is a species of velvet worms in the family Peripatopsidae. This species is a clade in the O. cinctipes species complex. This species has 16 pairs of legs. Specimens are brown and slate black with a line down the middle of the back and a brown ventral surface. The original description of this species is based on a male holotype measuring 13 mm in length. This species is found at high altitude in the forests of the Drakensberg mountains in KwaZulu-Natal province in South Africa.
