= Opisthopatus laevis =

Scientific classification
- Kingdom: Animalia
- Phylum: Onychophora
- Family: Peripatopsidae
- Genus: Opisthopatus
- Species: O. laevis

Binomial name
- Opisthopatus laevis Lawrence, 1947

Synonyms
- Opisthopatus cinctipes var. laevis (Lawrence, 1947)

Species of basal Peripatopsid velvet worm

Opisthopatus laevis is a species of velvet worm in the Peripatopsidae family. This species has 16 pairs of legs. The type locality is in South Africa. The validity of this species is uncertain: Some authorities consider O. laevis invalid even as a subspecies of O. cinctipes, a similar species also found in South Africa, but other authorities recognize O. laevis as a separate species, citing the significant distance (570 km) between the type localities of these two species.
