= Ernest Burges =

Ernest Travers Burges (14 August 1851 in Brislington – 10 June 1921 in Richmond) was Archdeacon of Maritzburg from 1908 until his death.

Burges was educated at Shrewsbury School and St John's College, Cambridge and ordained in 1881. After a curacy in Umzinto he was Vicar of Karkloof until 1905; and of Richmond until his death.
