= Opisthopatus natalensis =

Scientific classification
- Kingdom: Animalia
- Phylum: Onychophora
- Family: Peripatopsidae
- Genus: Opisthopatus
- Species: O. natalensis

Binomial name
- Opisthopatus natalensis Bouvier, 1900

Synonyms
- Opisthopatus cinctipes var. natalensis (Bouvier, 1900)

Species of basal Peripatopsid velvet worm

Opisthopatus natalensis is a species of velvet worm in the Peripatopsidae family. This species has 16 pairs of legs. The type locality is in South Africa. The validity of this species is uncertain: Although some authorities have deemed O. natalensis to be a subspecies of O. cinctipes, a similar species also found in South Africa, and others regard O. natalensis as invalid even as a subspecies, still other authorities recognize O. natalensis as a separate species, citing the significant distance (656 km) between the type localities of these two species.
