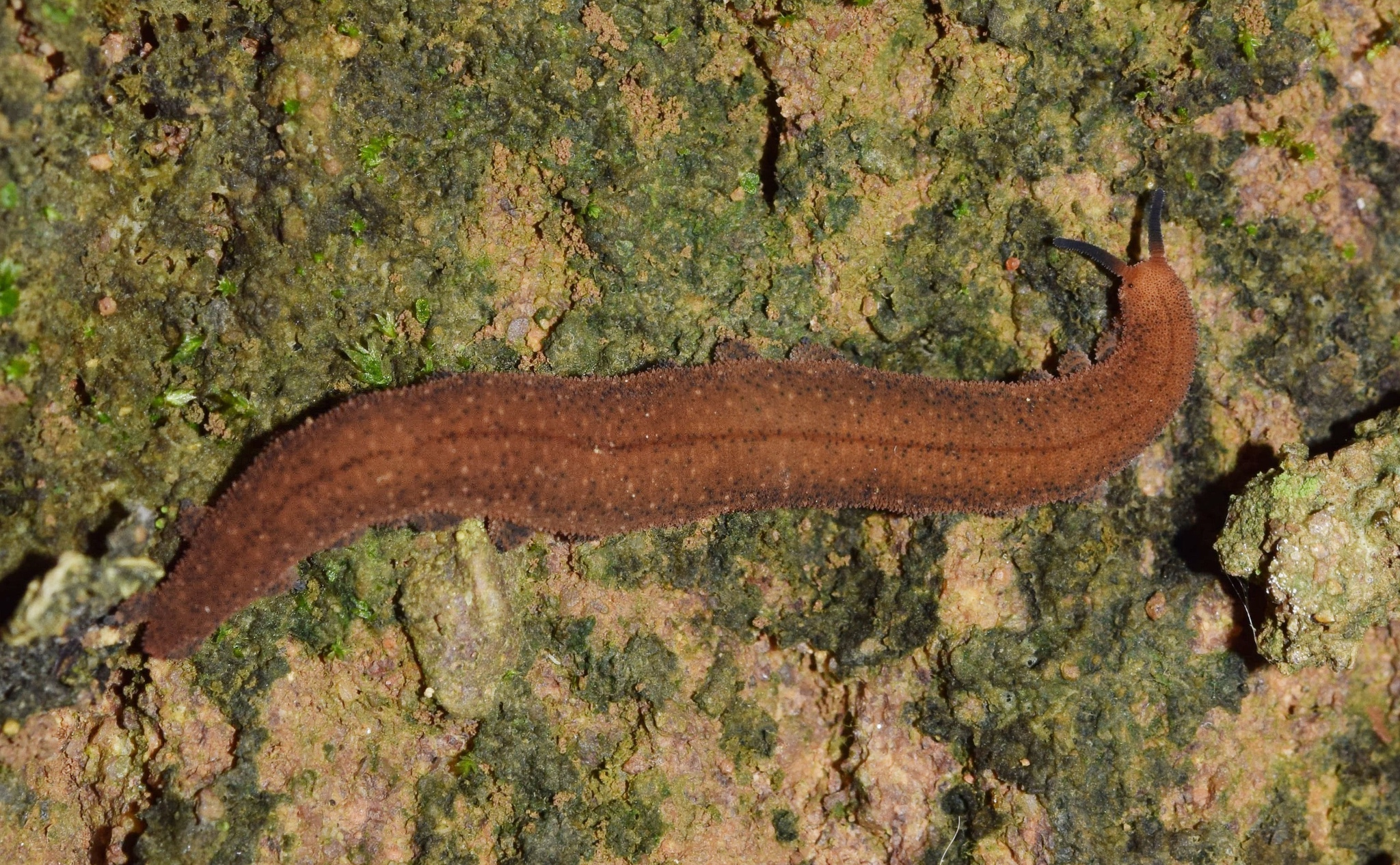

Scientific classification
- Kingdom: Animalia
- Phylum: Onychophora
- Family: Peripatopsidae
- Genus: Opisthopatus
- Species: O. kwazululandi

Binomial name
- Opisthopatus kwazululandi Daniels et al., 2016

= Opisthopatus kwazululandi =

Species of basal Peripatopsid velvet worm

Opisthopatus kwazululandi is a species of velvet worm in the family Peripatopsidae. This species is part of the O. cinctipes species complex. This species has 16 pairs of legs. The color of its dorsal surface varies from brown to rose pink, and the ventral surface ranges from light brown to creamy white. The original description of this species is based on a male holotype measuring 16 mm in length and a female holotype measuring 22 mm in length. Also known as the coastal velvet worm, this species is found in Eastern Cape province and Kwazulu-Natal province in South Africa.
