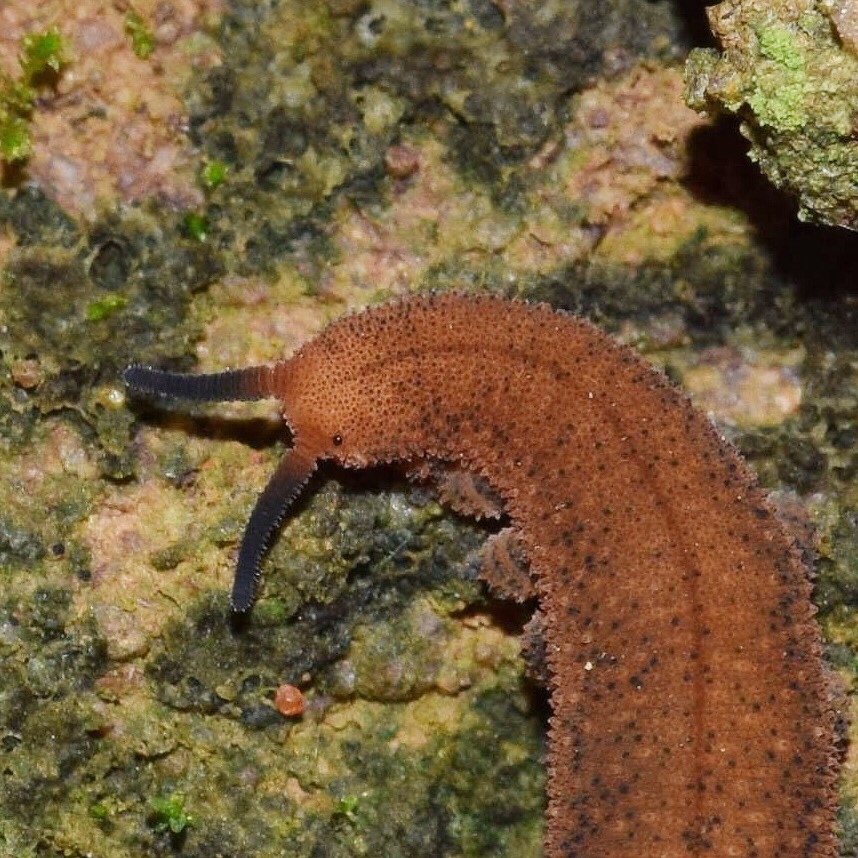
- Opisthopatus kwazululandi

Scientific classification
- Kingdom: Animalia
- Phylum: Onychophora
- Family: Peripatopsidae
- Genus: Opisthopatus; Purcell, 1899

Species
- See text

= Opisthopatus =

Genus of basal Peripatopsid velvet worms

Opisthopatus is a genus of South African velvet worms in the family Peripatopsidae. Velvet worms in this genus are found in South Africa, in the Eastern Cape, KwaZulu-Natal, and Mpumalanga provinces, as well as in Lesotho and Eswatini. This genus was first proposed in 1899 by the zoologist William F. Purcell to contain the newly discovered species O. cinctipes, which he designated as the type species.

== Description ==
Color is highly variable in this genus, both among and within species. The dorsal integument ranges from blue black to slate grey or brown, and the ventral integument ranges from creamy white to brown. The number of legs in this genus range from 16 pairs (e.g., in O. cinctipes) to 18 pairs (in O. roseus). Velvet worms in this genus use the last pair of legs in walking. This leg pair is fully developed, with claws and four pads on each foot. The feet in this genus feature three distal leg papillae: one anterior, one posterior, and one median. The genital opening is located between the last pair of legs. The male genitalia feature a cruciform opening and four pads; the female genitalia feature a longitudinal opening.

== Reproduction ==
Mothers in this genus give birth to live young. In particular, this genus exhibits matrotrophic viviparity, that is, mothers in this genus retain eggs in their uteri and supply nourishment to their embryos, but without any placenta. The young are born tail first, one or two at a time. The young resemble adults in form but are smaller.

== Species ==
The genus contains the following species:

- Opisthopatus amatolensis Choonoo, 1947
- Opisthopatus amaxhosa Daniels et al., 2016
- Opisthopatus baziya Barnes & Daniels, 2022
- Opisthopatus camdebooi Barnes & Daniels, 2022
- Opisthopatus cinctipes Purcell, 1899
- Opisthopatus drakensbergi Daniels et al., 2016
- Opisthopatus herbertorum Ruhberg & Hamer, 2005
- Opisthopatus highveldi Daniels et al., 2016
- Opisthopatus kwazululandi Daniels et al., 2016
- Opisthopatus laevis Lawrence, 1947
- Opisthopatus natalensis Bouvier, 1900
- Opisthopatus roseus Lawrence, 1947, the pink velvet worm
- Opisthopatus swatii Daniels et al., 2016
