= Opisthopatus herbertorum =

Scientific classification
- Kingdom: Animalia
- Phylum: Onychophora
- Family: Peripatopsidae
- Genus: Opisthopatus
- Species: O. herbertorum

Binomial name
- Opisthopatus herbertorum Ruhberg & Hamer, 2005

Species of basal Peripatopsid velvet worm

Opisthopatus herbertorum is a species of velvet worm in the Peripatopsidae family. The type locality is in South Africa. As originally described, this species is uniformly white with 17 pairs of legs. Subsequent phylogenetic results, however, cast doubt on this species delimitation based on morphology, indicating instead that O. herbertorum is a junior synonym of O. roseus.
