= Weza Forest =

The Weza Forest is also known as the Weza-Ngele Forest and is situated near Harding, KwaZulu-Natal, South Africa. This is a large Mistbelt Forest which has long been exploited for timber. The forest has been fragmented and reduced in size over many decades.

== Biodiversity ==
It is an important site for the endangered Cape parrot (Poicephalus robustus robustus). A species of Dwarf Chameleon lives here which is related to, or conspecific with the black-headed dwarf chameleon. The Critically Endangered pink velvet worm (Opisthopatus roseus) is only known to occur in Weza Forest.

== Bibliography ==
- Pooley, E. 1993. The Complete Field Guide to Trees of Natal, Zululand and Transkei, - ISBN 0-620-17697-0.
- Tolley, K. and Burger, M. 2007. Chameleons of Southern Africa. ISBN 978-1-77007-375-3.
