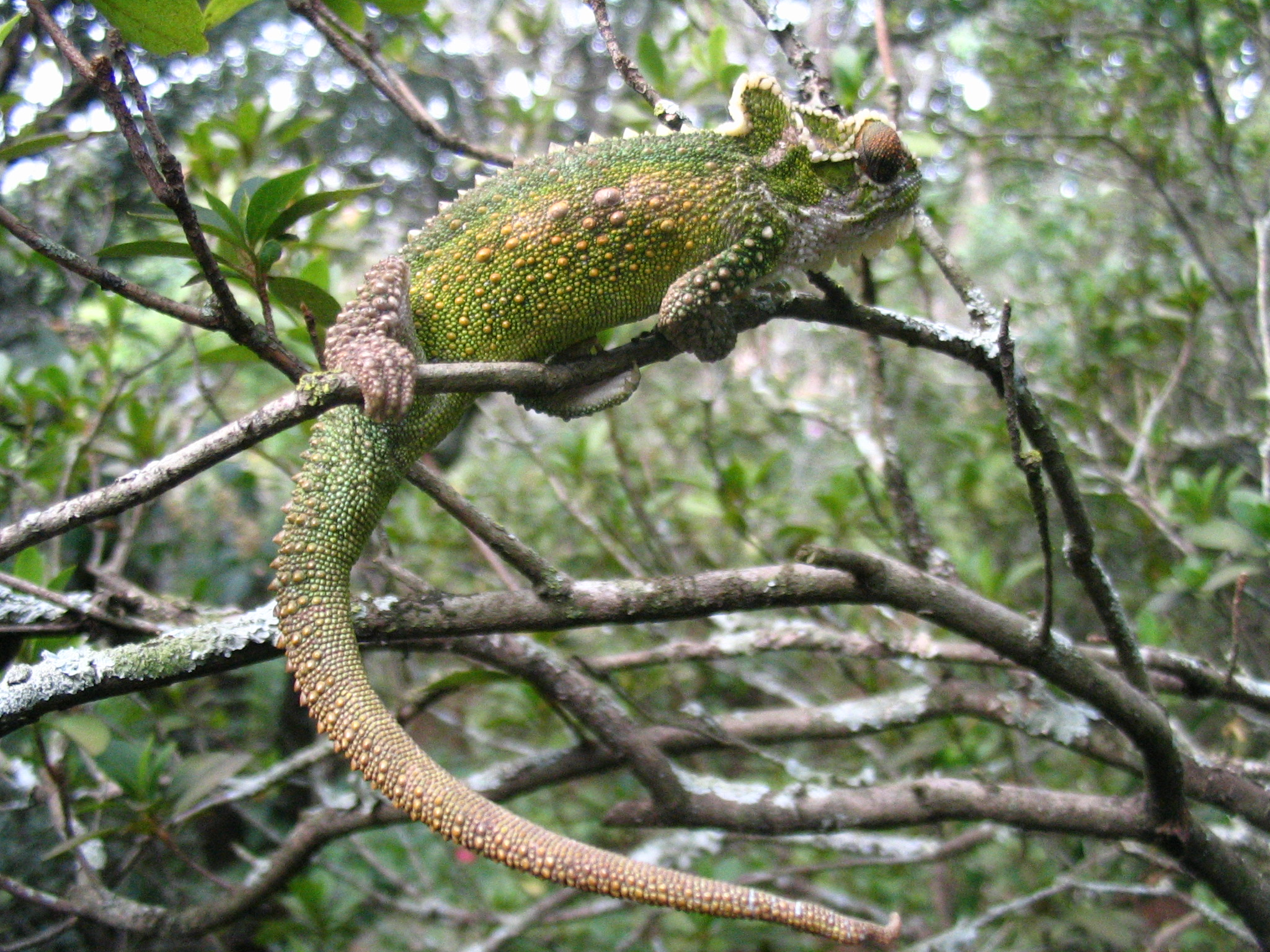

Conservation status
- Endangered (IUCN 3.1)
- CITES Appendix II

Scientific classification
- Kingdom: Animalia
- Phylum: Chordata
- Class: Reptilia
- Order: Squamata
- Suborder: Iguania
- Family: Chamaeleonidae
- Genus: Bradypodion
- Species: B. thamnobates

Binomial name
- Bradypodion thamnobates Raw, 1976
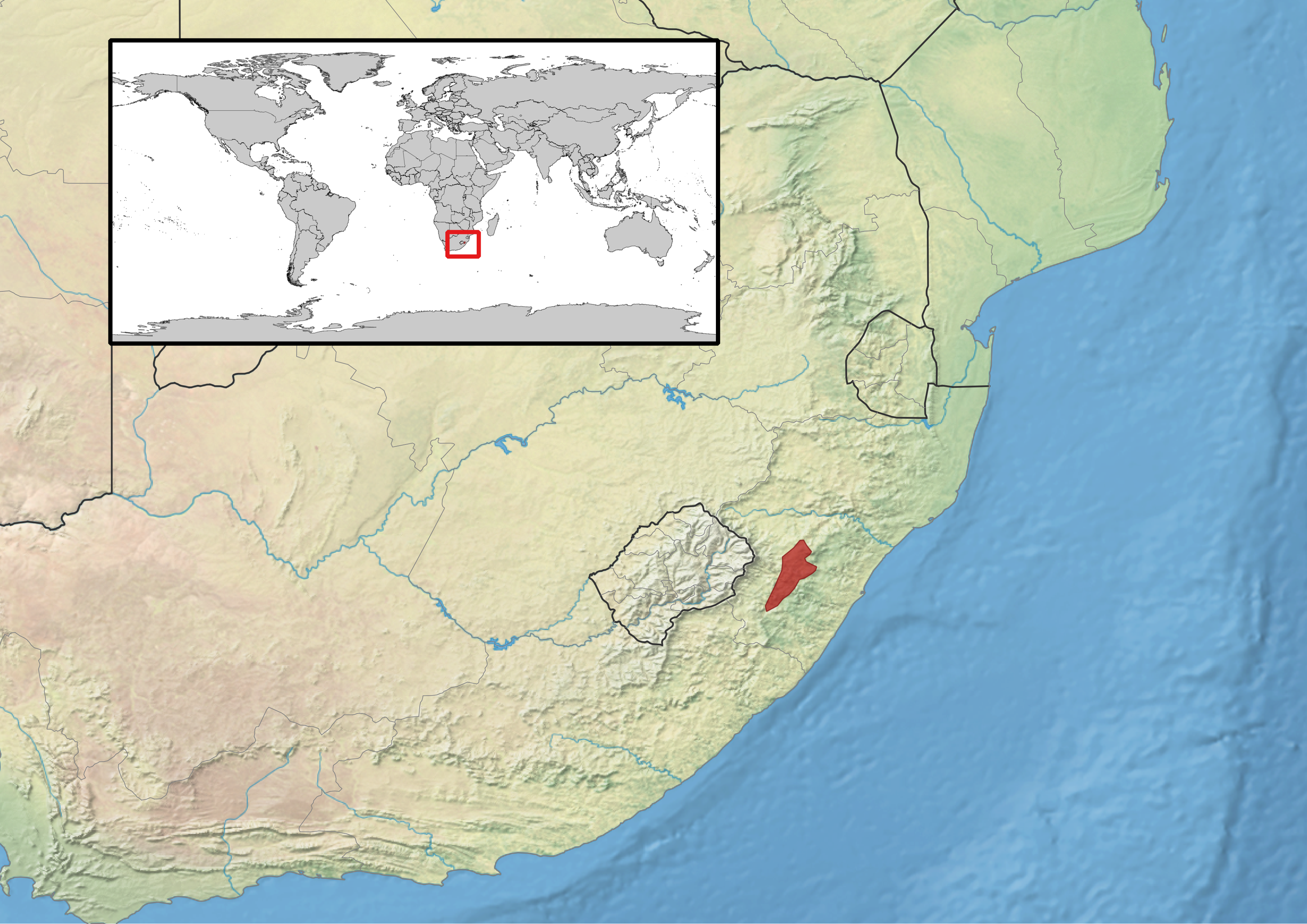

Synonyms
- Chamaeleo thamnobates

= Natal Midlands dwarf chameleon =

Species of reptile

The Natal Midlands dwarf chameleon (Bradypodion thamnobates) is a chameleon native to woodland habitat in the inland Midlands area of the South African province of KwaZulu-Natal.

== Description ==
Its length is 7.6 centimetres (3.0 in), relatively small for its genus, and it has bulbous scales of varying colors scattered around the body. The head crest is yellow, with white skin on its throat. Males have a short orange stripe around the middle of their bodies and red-spotted eyelids, whereas females are brown with smaller helmet-like protrusions. They otherwise have considerable variation in their colouration.

== Naming ==
Its specific name thamnobates means "bush-walker".

In addition to the common name Natal Midlands dwarf chameleon, it is also known under the longer common name of KwaZulu-Natal Midlands dwarf chameleon.

== Relatives and taxonomy ==
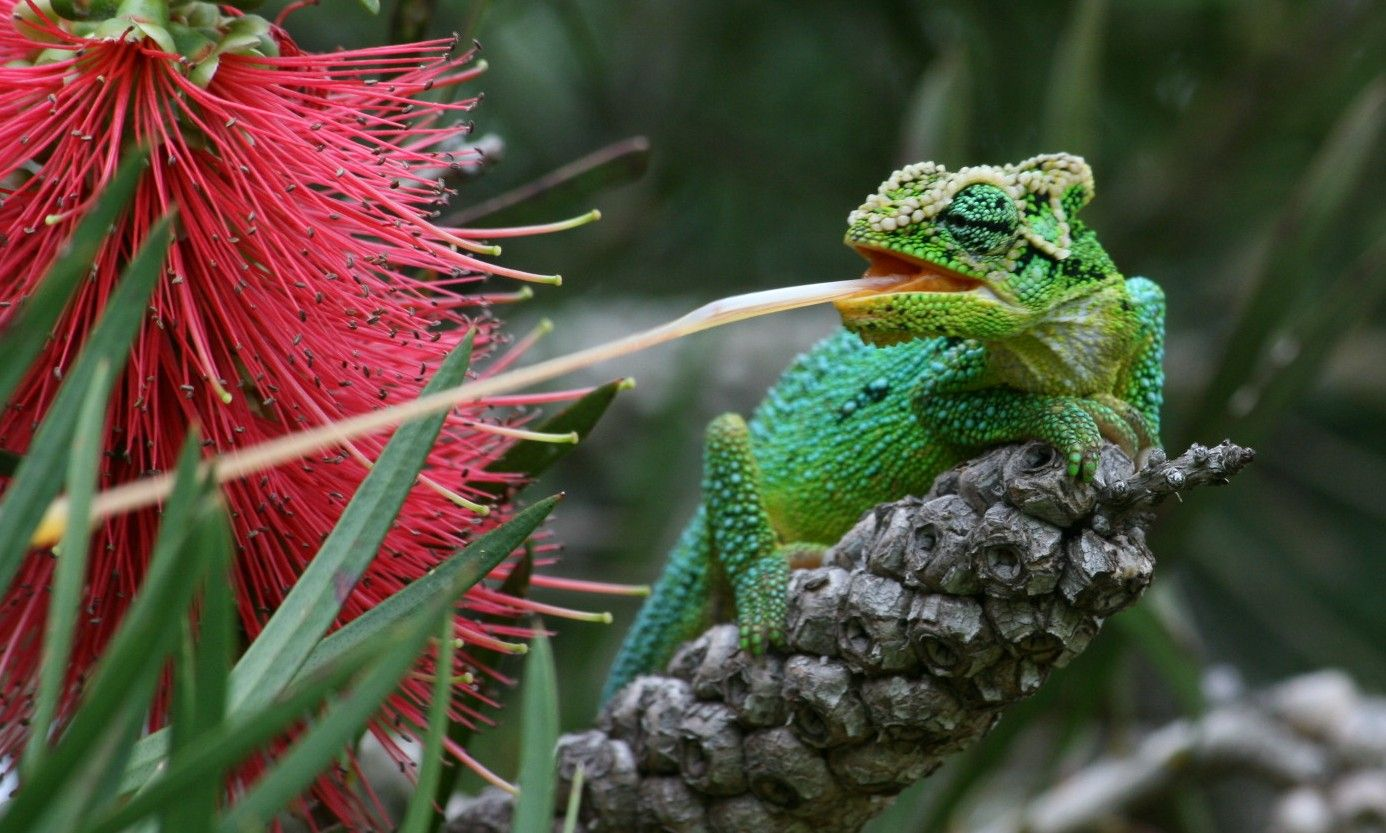
An emerald dwarf chameleon

This is a very close relative of the black-headed dwarf chameleon (B. melanocephalum), which looks very different due to adaptation to low forest and fynbos on the slopes and cliffs seawards from the B. thamnobates range. B. melanocephalum and B. thamnobates may be phenotypically plastic populations of the same species, but juveniles of both species were raised under identical conditions and developed into what was phenotypically expected of their original populations, indicating they are separate species.

An undescribed dwarf chameleon population from Gilboa and Karkloof Forests in KwaZulu-Natal seems closely related to both B. melanocephalum and B. thamnobates. It appears as if they radiated quite recently from a common ancestor, which probably was much like the Midlands form in appearance (as this is the most plesiomorphic of them). Indeed, ongoing gene flow or incomplete lineage sorting is indicated between these populations. Thus it is not certain whether they constitute one, three, or even more species, and more research is required.

Another undescribed dwarf chameleon, the bright green emerald dwarf chameleon, found in the Drakensberg between of 29°15′S and 29°45′S, is now known to be closely related to the Natal Midlands dwarf chameleon and may yet be described as a separate species.

== Distribution ==
The range of the Midlands and Gilboa Forest populations and that of the Drakensberg dwarf chameleon (B. dracomontanum) require delimitation, as they appear to touch in eastern Lesotho and adjacent South Africa. The Drakensberg species is not closely related to the KwaZulu-Natal group, however, and no significant gene flow between them seems to occur.

The Natal Midlands dwarf chameleon is classified as an Endangered species by the IUCN. It is used in local folk medicine.
