= Opisthopatus amaxhosa =

Scientific classification
- Kingdom: Animalia
- Phylum: Onychophora
- Family: Peripatopsidae
- Genus: Opisthopatus
- Species: O. amaxhosa

Binomial name
- Opisthopatus amaxhosa Daniels et al., 2016

Species of basal Peripatopsid velvet worm

Opisthopatus amaxhosa is a species of velvet worm in the family Peripatopsidae. This species is a clade in the O. cinctipes species complex. This species has 16 or 17 pairs of legs in both sexes and varies from light to dark pink on the dorsal surface and from dark to light brown on the ventral surface. Males of this species range from 12 mm to 14 mm in length. Also known as the Xhosa velvet worm, this species is found in the Eastern Cape province in South Africa.
