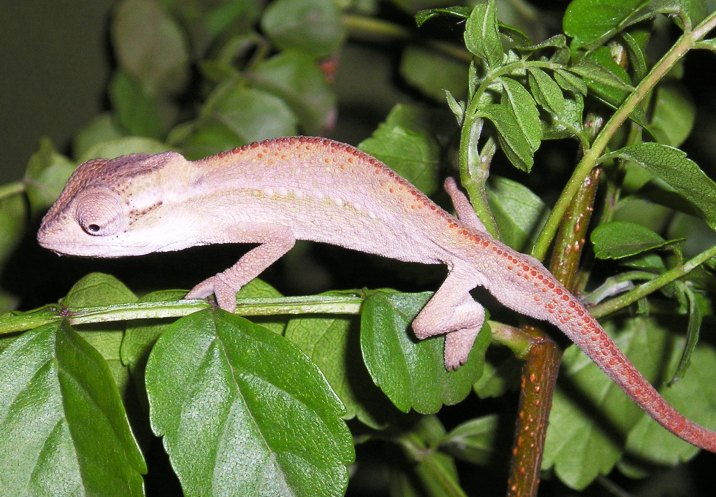

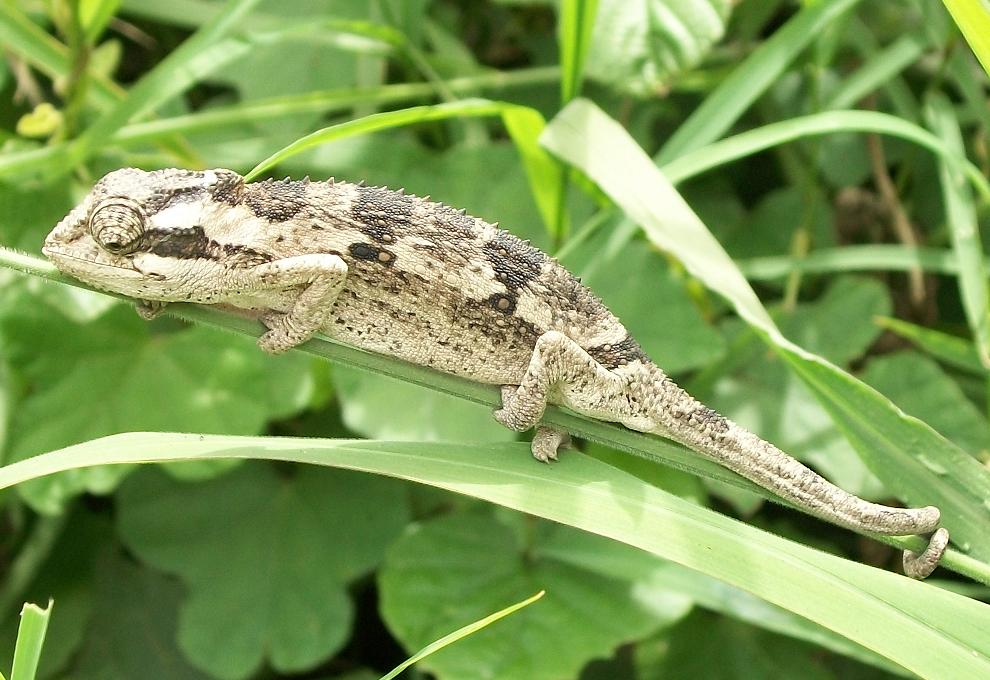

Conservation status
- Near Threatened (IUCN 3.1)
- CITES Appendix II

Scientific classification
- Kingdom: Animalia
- Phylum: Chordata
- Class: Reptilia
- Order: Squamata
- Suborder: Iguania
- Family: Chamaeleonidae
- Genus: Bradypodion
- Species: B. melanocephalum

Binomial name
- Bradypodion melanocephalum (Gray, 1865)
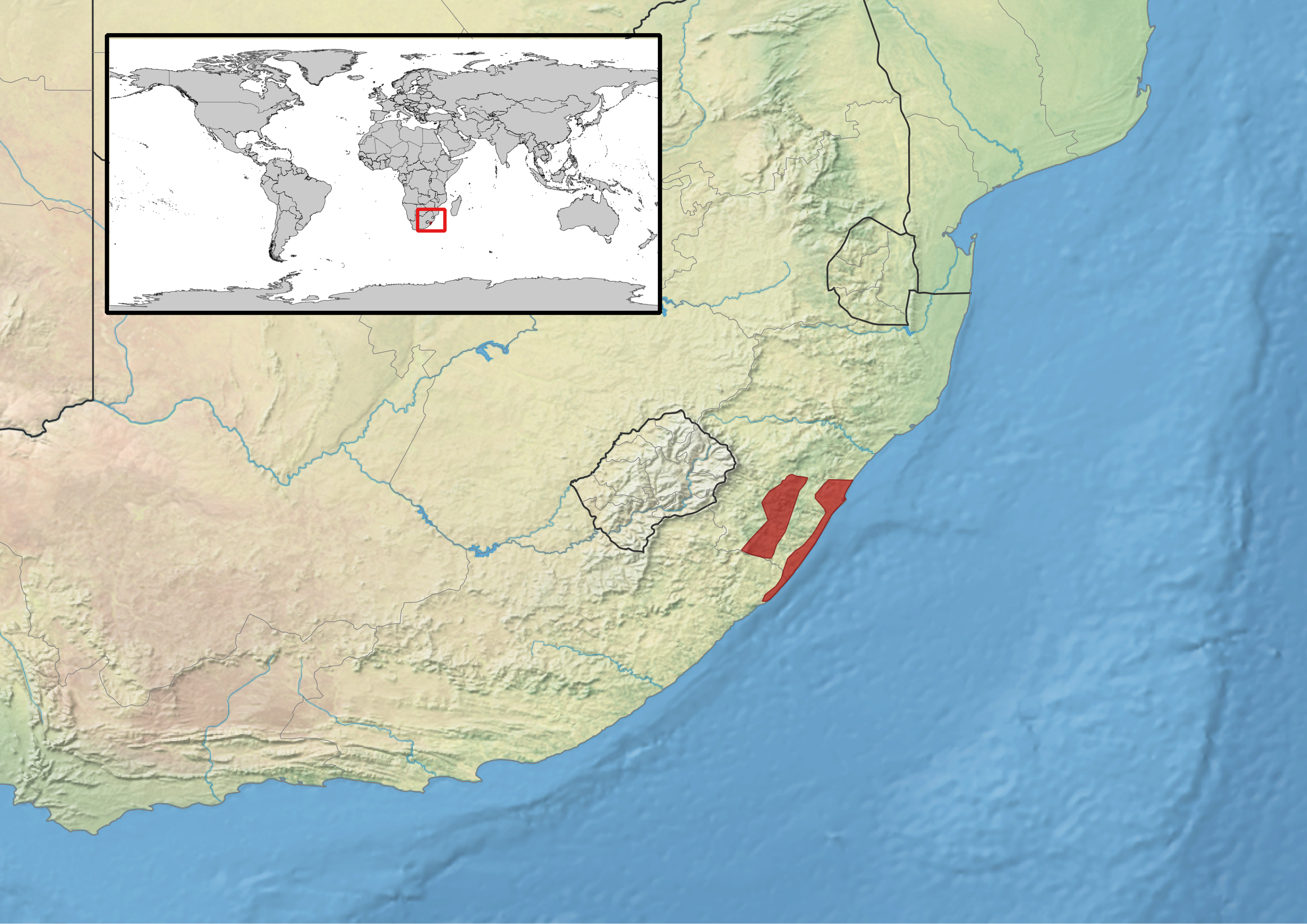

Synonyms
- Microsaura melanocephala Gray, 1865

= Black-headed dwarf chameleon =

Species of lizard

The black-headed dwarf chameleon (Bradypodion melanocephalum) is a lizard of the family Chamaeleonidae endemic to KwaZulu-Natal, South Africa. It is also known as the KwaZulu dwarf chamaeleon and Durban dwarf chameleon.

== Distribution ==
This chameleon is found in the coastal areas from north of Durban in KwaZulu-Natal south and west to Mkambati Nature Reserve in the east of the Eastern Cape; it also occurs in some inland areas (KwaZulu-Natal Midlands).

== Taxonomy ==
The current species may consist of several separate species. At least three regional variants are found; one in Karkloof and Gilboa Forests, one in Weza Forest, and one in the area around Ixopo and Donnybrook.

B. melanocephalum and the Natal Midlands dwarf chameleon (B. thamnobates) might be phenotypically plastic populations of the same species. However, when juveniles of both species were raised under identical conditions, they developed into what was phenotypically expected of their original populations, indicating that they are separate species.

== Description ==
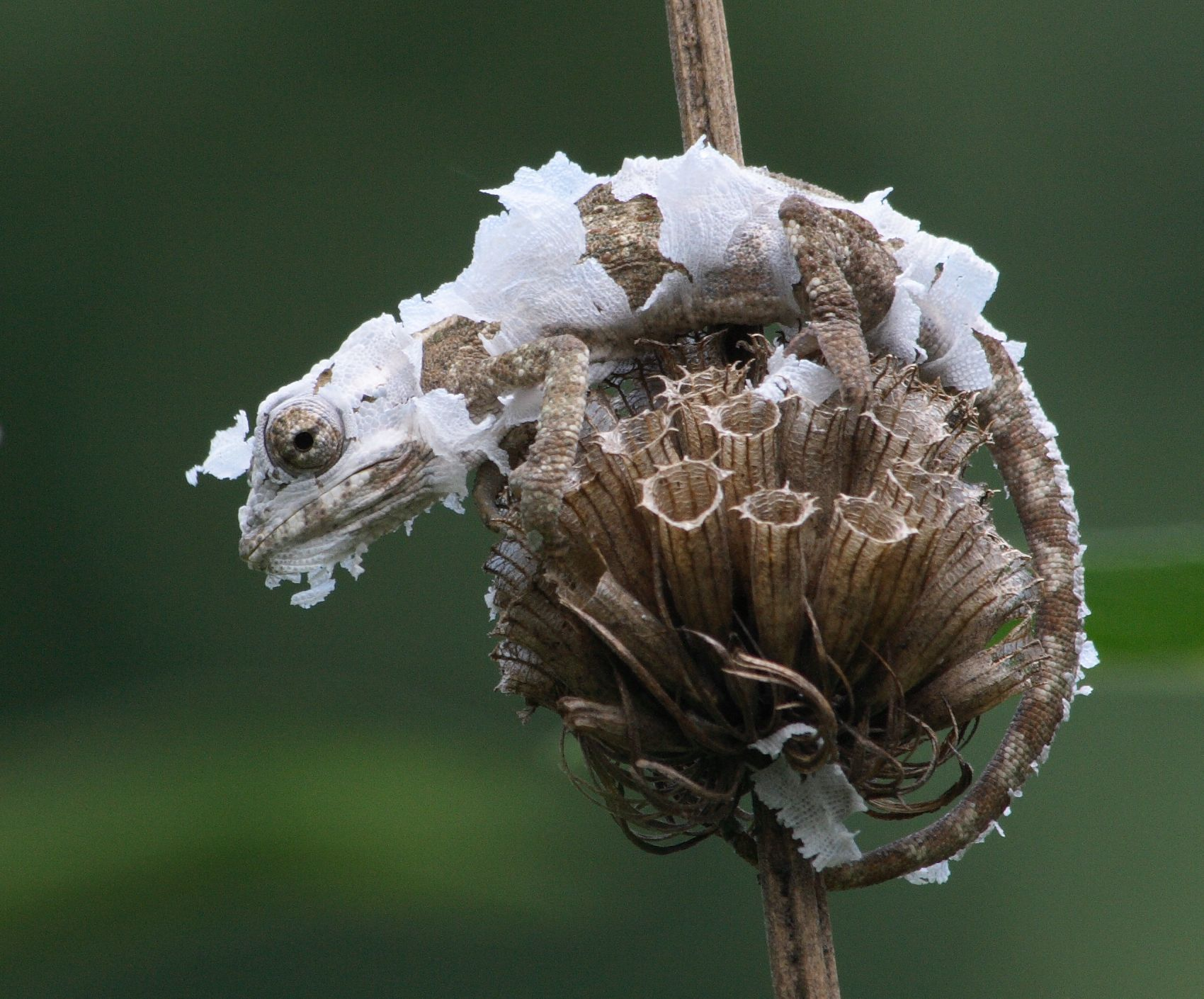
Moulting; Pietermaritzburg

This species is generally brownish in colour, but like other chamaeleons, can change colour and pattern to camouflage itself in its surroundings. It has been observed ranging in colour from dark brown, through light brown, olive green, to a pale creamy colour at night. The head is sometimes a darker colour than the rest of the body, but not black. The common name, black-headed dwarf chamaeleon, stems from the first specimen studied where the head had turned black in the preservation process.

== Habitat ==
B. melanocephalum inhabits a range of vegetation types such as grasslands, bushlands, thickets, trees, and roadside verges. It can also live in well-vegetated urban gardens.

== Behaviour and biology ==
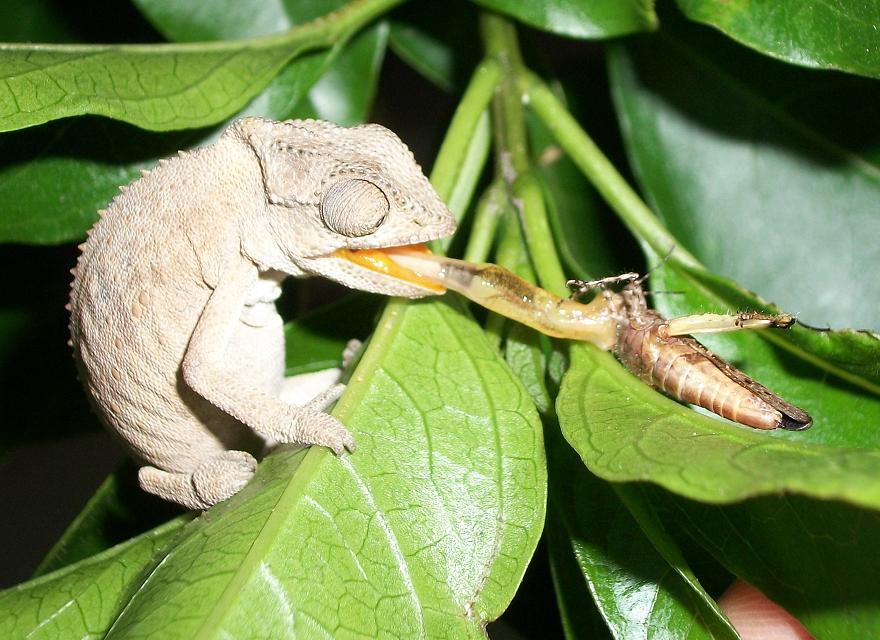
Catching a grasshopper

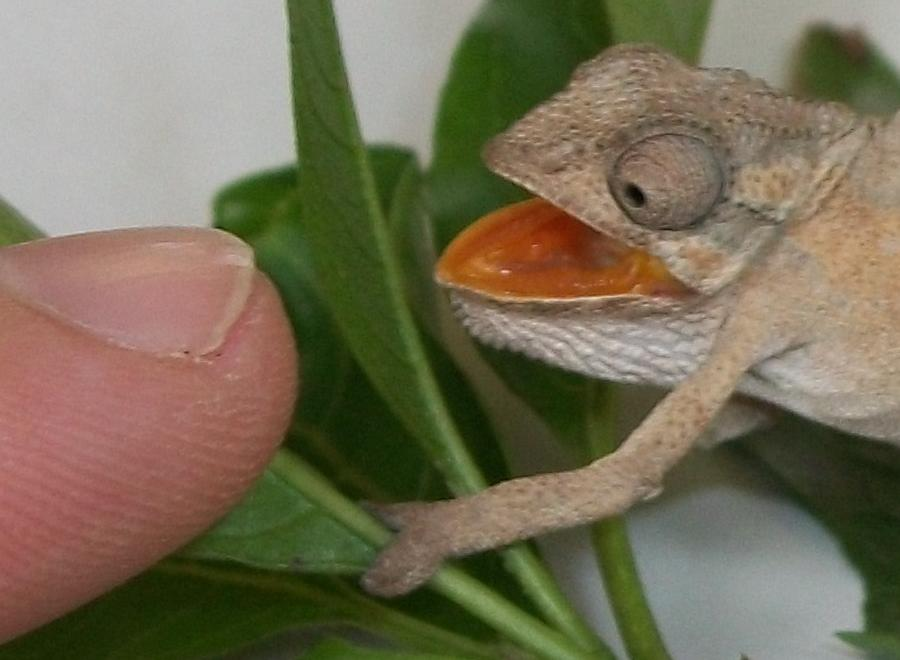
Threat display to a human finger

This reptile feeds on small insects such as crickets and grasshoppers, which it captures in typical chameleon fashion with a long tongue.

It gives birth to live young in summer.

Predators of this animal include the snake boomslang (Dispholidus typus), shrikes and starlings, and domestic cats.

When threatened, it may open its mouth to reveal the bright yellow-orange interior in an attempt to scare the threat away.

== Threats ==
The black-headed dwarf chameleon is vulnerable because of its limited distribution. It is found in a number of small nature reserves within its range, but outside of these areas, it is threatened by habitat destruction, mostly for housing and industrial development. Roads are also a threat in dividing habitats; these animals are not adapted to open areas and move very slowly, making them soft targets for predators and vehicles on open roads. It is sometimes taken as a pet, but this is illegal; no indigenous South African animal may be kept in captivity without a permit.
