= Tshanini Nature Reserve =

The Tshanini Nature Reserve is a community conservation area to the south of Tembe Elephant Park, KwaZulu-Natal, South Africa.

The reserve protects rare sand forest and is notable for a record of a forest green butterfly (Euryphura achlys).
