= Opisthopatus baziya =

Scientific classification
- Kingdom: Animalia
- Phylum: Onychophora
- Family: Peripatopsidae
- Genus: Opisthopatus
- Species: O. baziya

Binomial name
- Opisthopatus baziya Barnes & Daniels, 2022

Species of basal Peripatopsid velvet worm

Opisthopatus baziya is a species of velvet worm in the family Peripatopsidae. This species has 16 or 17 pairs of legs in both sexes and ranges from rose pink to dark pink. Male specimens range from 17 mm to 31 mm in length; female specimens range from 13 mm to 26 mm in length. This species is endemic to the forests at Baziya in the Eastern Cape province of South Africa.
