= Karkloof Forest =

Coordinates: 29°17′54″S 30°13′56″E

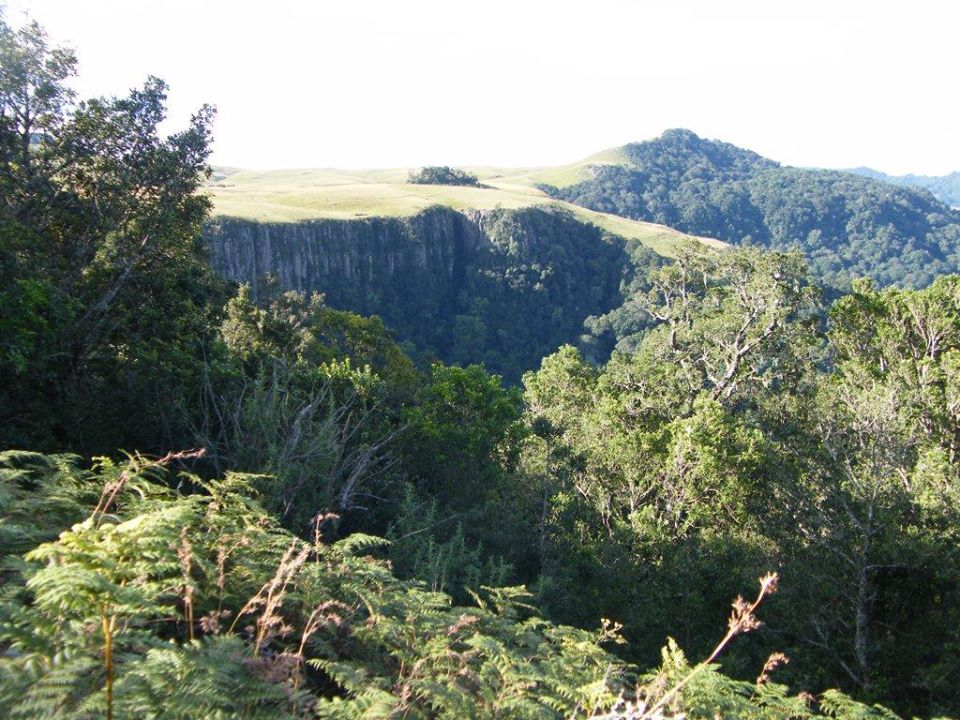
View of part of Karkloof Forest and plateau

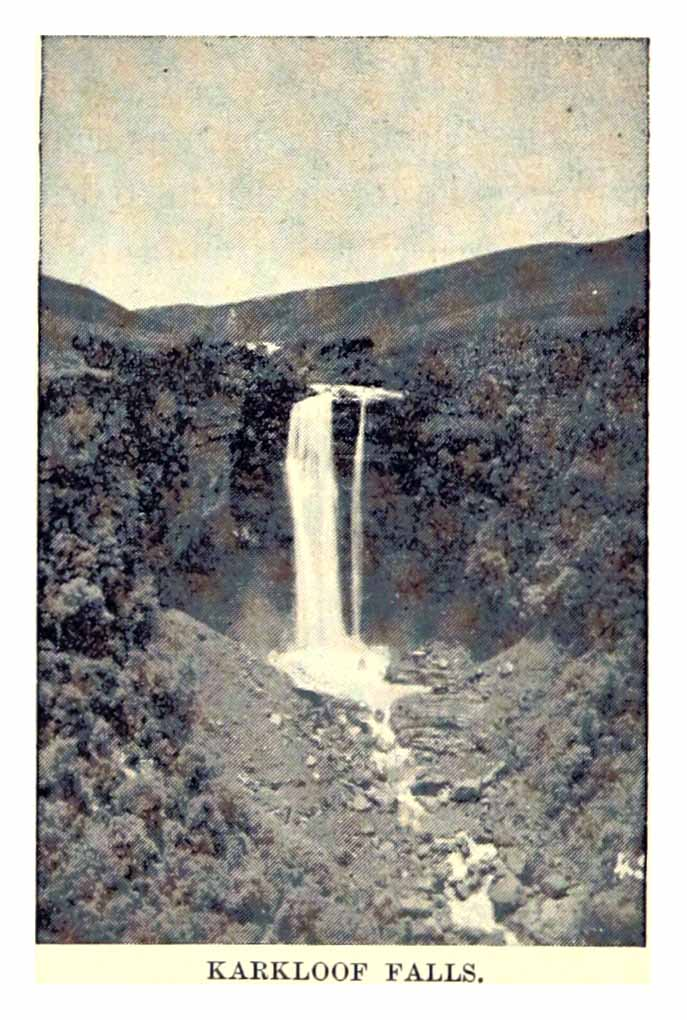
1898

The Karkloof Forest is situated in the Karkloof Nature Reserve, 22 km north of Howick, KwaZulu-Natal, South Africa.

This is a large (936ha) mistbelt forest containing yellowwoods (Afrocarpus falcatus, Podocarpus latifolius and Podocarpus henkelii) and stinkwood (Ocotea bullata).

Wildlife includes Samango monkey, blue duiker and bushbuck. Crowned eagles (Stephanoaetus coronatus) breed here, and the endangered Cape parrot (Poicephalus robustus robustus) occurs here.

Endemics to the area include a subspecies of crested guineafowl (Guttera edouardi symonsi), and a dwarf chameleon (Bradypodion sp.) which is related to the Natal Midlands dwarf chameleon and the black-headed dwarf chameleon.

Other animals found here include Knysna turaco (Tauraco corythaix), forest canary (Crithagra scotops), white-starred robin (Pogonocichla stellata), orange ground thrush (Zoothera gurneyi), red-throated wryneck (Jynx ruficollis), golden-tailed woodpecker (Campethera abingoni) and martial eagles (Polemaetus bellicosus).

== See also ==
- Forests of KwaZulu-Natal

== Bibliography ==
- Pooley, E. (1993). The Complete Field Guide to Trees of Natal, Zululand and Transkei. ISBN 0-620-17697-0.
- Tolley, K. and Burger, M. 2007. Chameleons of Southern Africa. ISBN 978-1-77007-375-3.
