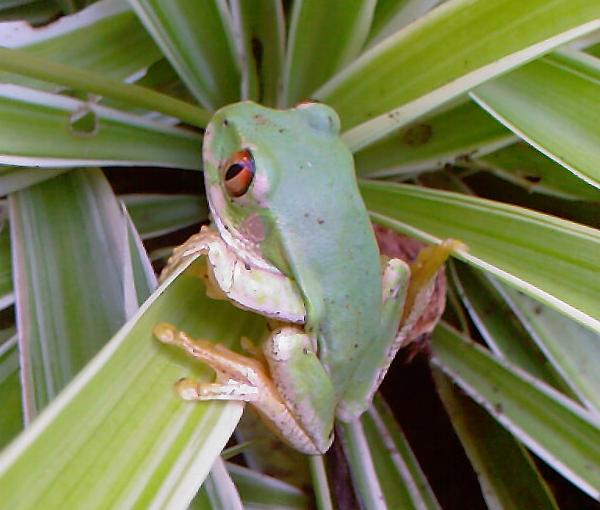
- Leptopelis natalensis from Durban, South Africa
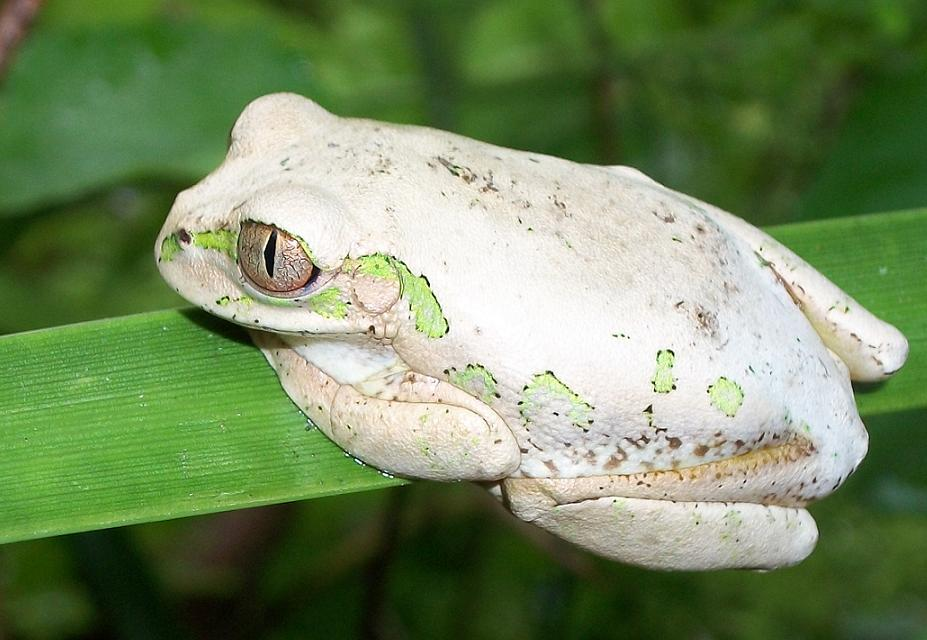
- From Bazely, KwaZulu-Natal south coast

Conservation status
- Least Concern (IUCN 3.1)

Scientific classification
- Kingdom: Animalia
- Phylum: Chordata
- Class: Amphibia
- Order: Anura
- Family: Arthroleptidae
- Genus: Leptopelis
- Species: L. natalensis

Binomial name
- Leptopelis natalensis (Smith, 1849)

= Natal forest tree frog =

Species of amphibian

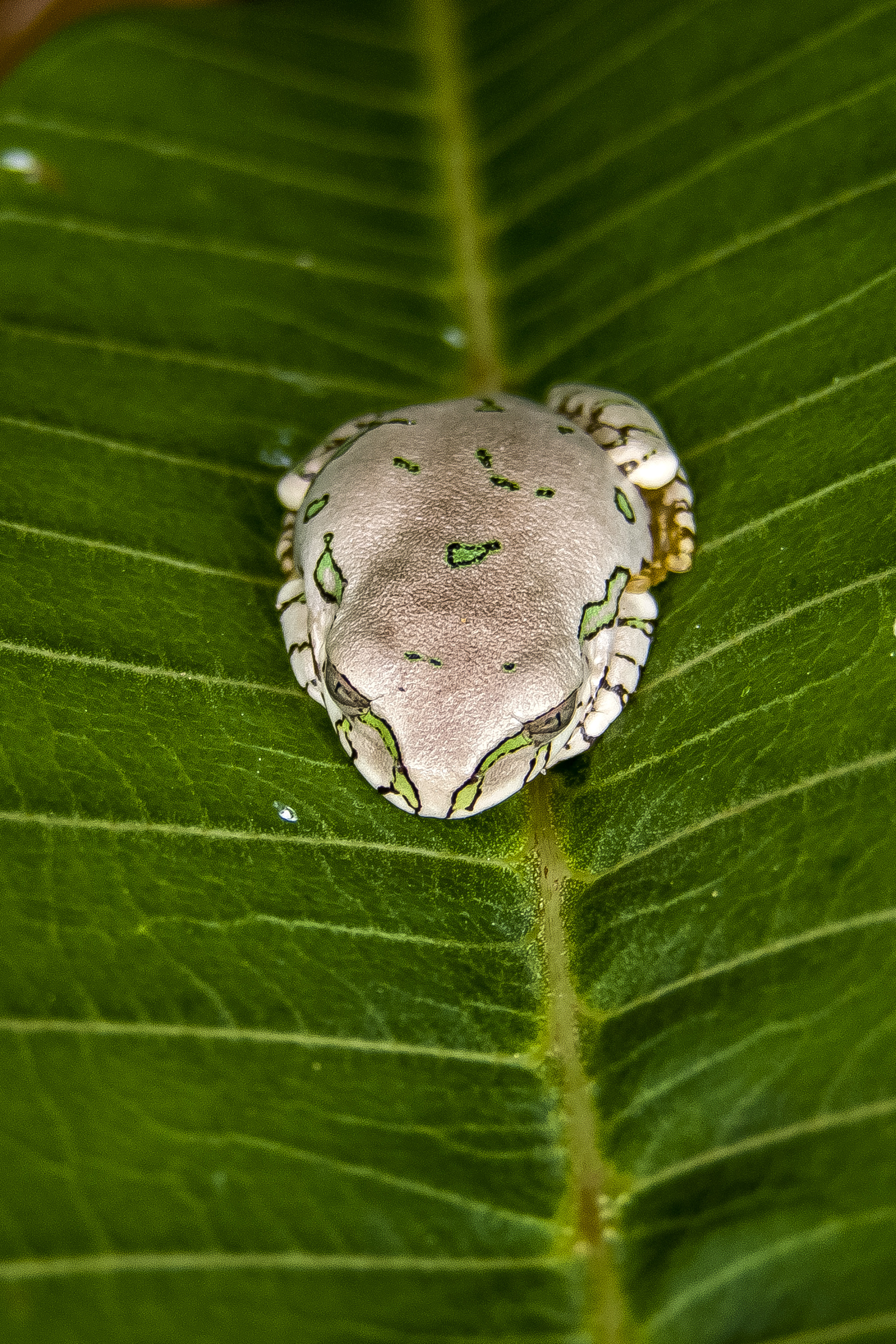
Sleeping Natal Forest Tree Frog

The Natal forest tree frog (Leptopelis natalensis) is a species of frog in the family Arthroleptidae, subfamily Leptopelinae, and is endemic to the eastern coastal area of South Africa. A typical tree frog, it has large eyes and a broad mouth. Its colouration is highly variable: Some may be bright green, others cream coloured, and some may be cream with olive-green blotches.

Its natural habitats are temperate forests, temperate shrubland, subtropical forests, swamps, intermittent freshwater marshes, and rural gardens. It is threatened by habitat loss.

These frogs usually live in the foliage and branches of forest trees. They lay eggs on banks of ponds and quiet streams, or on broad leaves near the water's edge. The tadpoles hatch and drop into the water where they grow and develop into frogs. Its call is somewhat akin to "bwee YACK-yack". The first part of the call being described as "soft buzzing".
