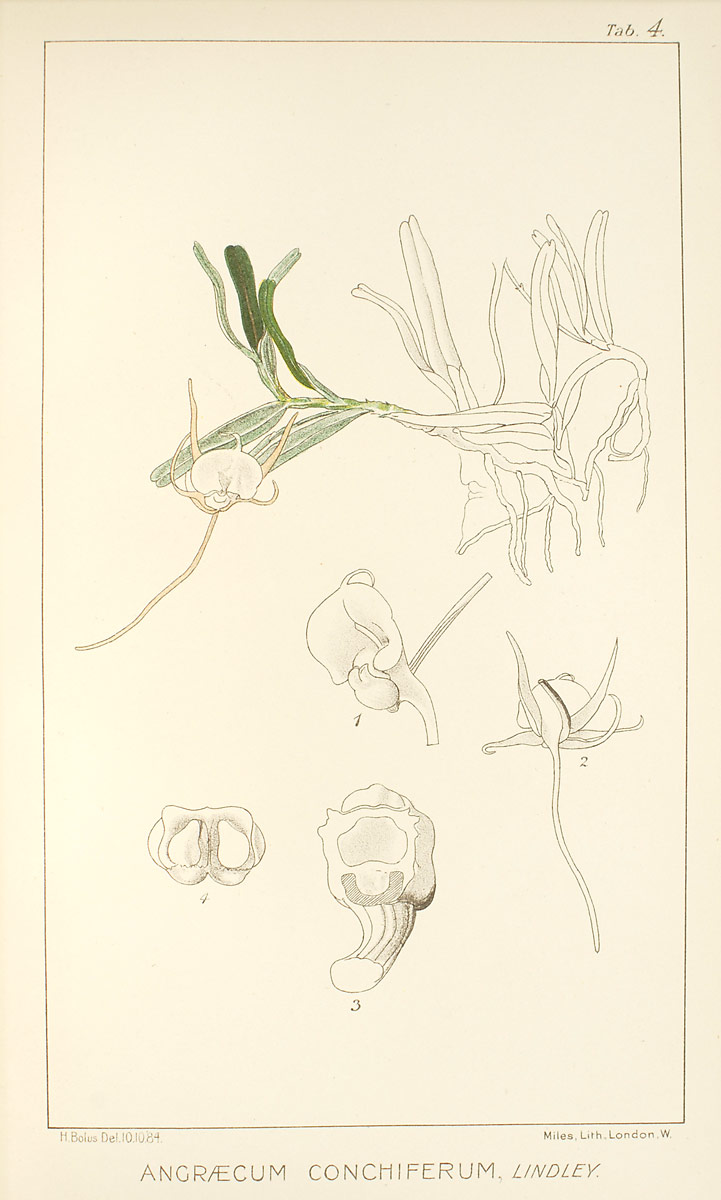

Scientific classification
- Kingdom: Plantae
- Clade: Tracheophytes
- Clade: Angiosperms
- Clade: Monocots
- Order: Asparagales
- Family: Orchidaceae
- Subfamily: Epidendroideae
- Genus: Angraecum
- Species: A. conchiferum

Binomial name
- Angraecum conchiferum Lindl. (1836)

Synonyms
- Angorchis conchifera (Lindl.) Kuntze (1891); Angraecum verrucosum Rendle (1895); Mystacidium verrucosum (Rendle) Rolfe (1897); Angraecum scabripes Kraenzl. (1902)

= Angraecum conchiferum =

Species of orchid

Angraecum conchiferum is a species of orchid found in Knysna and Tsitsikamma forests.

This rather rare and attractive species has the distinction of having the largest flowers of the South African monopodial epiphytic orchids. It normally forms untidy clumps of long, thin, pendulous sterns which carry small dark-green, linear leaves spaced along the stems in two ranks. The solitary white flower have a distinct shell-like lip and a long spur. Flowers appear from September to November.

The stems are up to 20 centimetres (7.9 in) long and 3 millimetres (0.12 in) in diameter and are covered with minute superficial protuberances which usually blacken with age. The white roots 2–3 millimetres (0.079–0.118 in) in diameter are covered with small wart-like glands. Up to twelve leaves are produced 3–5 centimetres (1.2–2.0 in) long and 5–7 millimetres (0.20–0.28 in) broad. One to two thin upright inflorescences 2.5–3 centimetres (0.98–1.18 in) long carry one, rarely two, flowers 5–6 centimetres (2.0–2.4 in) across. The shell-shaped lip is 1.3–1.8 centimetres (0.51–0.71 in) across and the spur is 4–5 centimetres (1.6–2.0 in) long.

Occurs in deep shade in cool moist temperate forests usually as a high-level epiphyte on large trees though sometimes it occurs on small trees near the fringe of forests.

The name "conchiferum" is derived from Latin meaning "shell-bearing" which refers to the lip.
