= Opisthopatus cinctipes =

Scientific classification
- Kingdom: Animalia
- Phylum: Onychophora
- Family: Peripatopsidae
- Genus: Opisthopatus
- Species: O. cinctipes

Binomial name
- Opisthopatus cinctipes Purcell, 1899

Species of basal Peripatopsid velvet worm

Opisthopatus cinctipes is a species of velvet worm in the Peripatopsidae family. This species has 16 pairs of legs, all with claws and all used for walking. The color of the dorsal surface varies from blue to olive green. Females range from 7 mm to 50 mm in length, whereas males range from 6 mm to 36 mm. Like other velvet worms in this genus, this species exhibits matrotrophic viviparity, that is, mothers in this genus retain eggs in their uteri and supply nourishment to their embryos, but without any placenta. The type locality is in South Africa .
