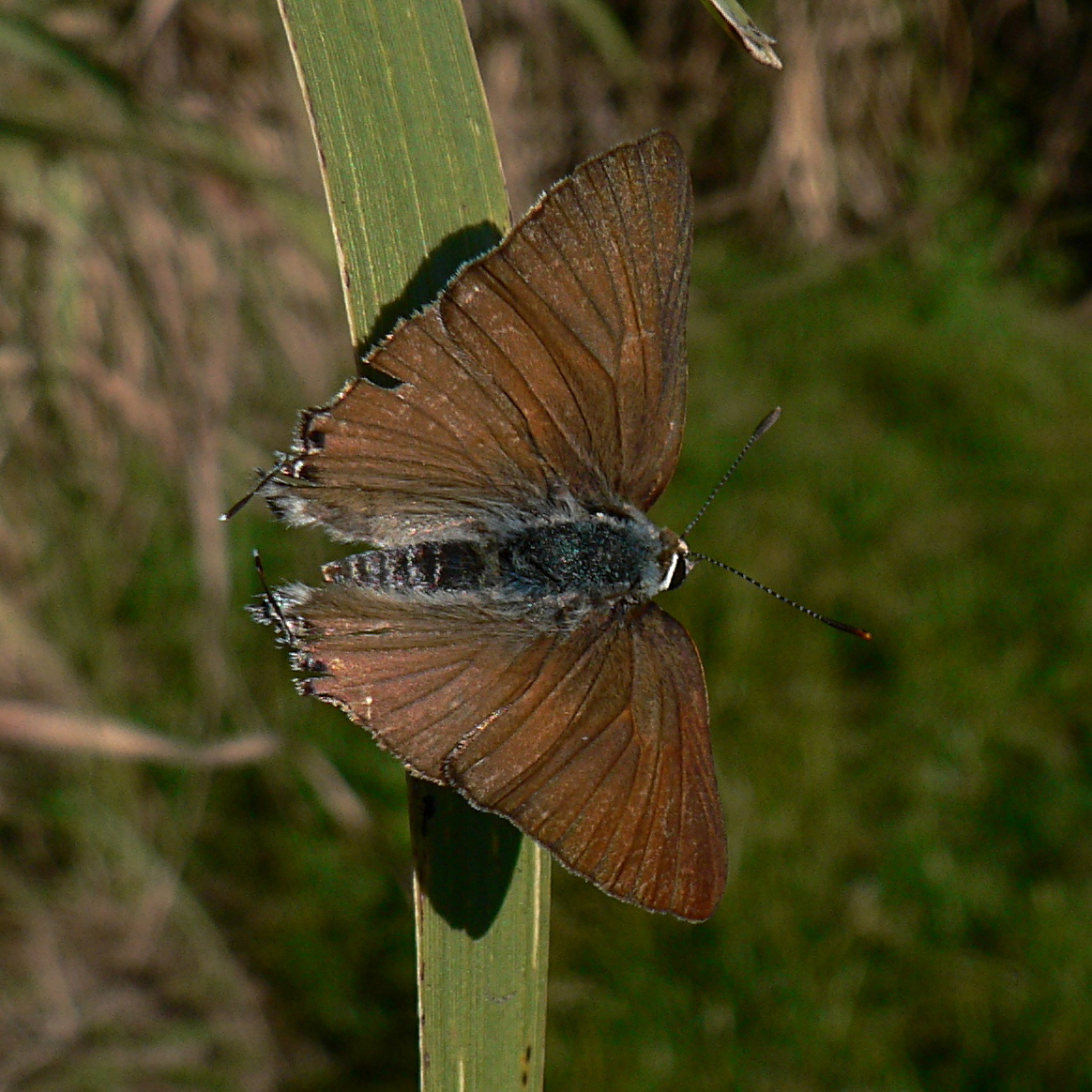
- Tongaat, South Africa
- Aburi Botanical Gardens, Ghana

Scientific classification
- Kingdom: Animalia
- Phylum: Arthropoda
- Clade: Pancrustacea
- Class: Insecta
- Order: Lepidoptera
- Family: Lycaenidae
- Genus: Deudorix
- Species: D. antalus

Binomial name
- Deudorix antalus (Hopffer, 1855)

Synonyms
- Dipsas antalus Hopffer, 1855; Lycaena anta Trimen, 1862; Deudorix gambius Mabille, 1887; Deudorix antalus var. kitobolensis Strand, 1912

= Deudorix antalus =

Brown playboy

Species of butterfly

Deudorix antalus, the brown playboy, is a butterfly of the family Lycaenidae. It is found in Africa (including Madagascar) and south-west Arabia.

The wingspan is 22–34 mm for males and 22–40 mm for females. Adults are on wing year-round with peaks from September to October and from March to May.

The larvae feed on the fruit of a wide range of plants, including Haplocoelum galiense, Schotia species (including S. afra and Schotia speciosa), Faidherbia albida, Syzygium species (including S. guineense), Ximenia species (including X. afra, X. poppae), Acacia species (including A. stenocarpa), Prunus species (including Prunus persica ispahanensis), Cassia, Phaseolus lunatus, Sutherlandia, Crotalaria, Dolichos, Nymania capensis, Combretum, Quisqualis, Albizia, Baphia, Bauhinia, Burkea, Caesalpinia, Cajanus, Canavalia, Phaseolus, Pisum, Vigna, Macadamia, Olea, Paphia, Cardiospermum and Capsicum species.

Torben Larsen developed a species numbering system for his 2005 publication Butterflies of West Africa. This species is #494. The 'Larsen' numbers have since been used with permission in A Sharp Eye on Butterflies of Ghana.
