= C30H58O2 =

The molecular formula C_{30}H_{58}O_{2} may refer to:

- Cetyl myristoleate
- Lumequeic acid
