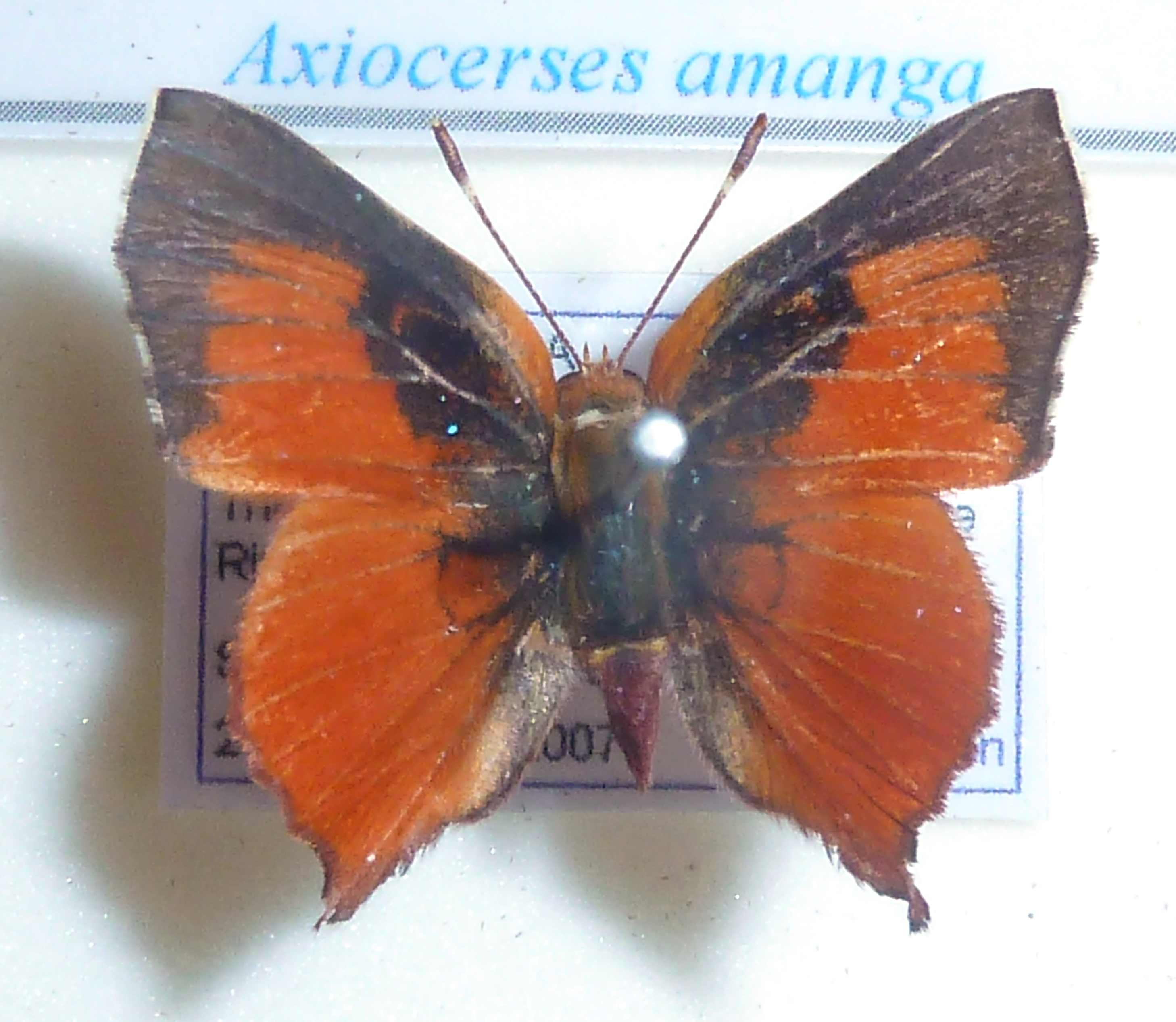

Conservation status
- Least Concern (IUCN 3.1)

Scientific classification
- Kingdom: Animalia
- Phylum: Arthropoda
- Clade: Pancrustacea
- Class: Insecta
- Order: Lepidoptera
- Family: Lycaenidae
- Genus: Axiocerses
- Species: A. amanga

Binomial name
- Axiocerses amanga (Westwood, 1881)

Synonyms
- Zeritis amanga Westwood, 1881; Axiocerses baumi Weymer, 1901; Chrysorychia mendeche Grose-Smith, 1889; Axiocerses mendeche var. borealis Aurivillius, 1905

= Axiocerses amanga =

Bush scarlet

Species of butterfly

Axiocerses amanga, the bush scarlet, is a butterfly of the family Lycaenidae. It is found in Sub-Saharan Africa.

The wingspan is 24–28 mm for males and 25–30 mm for females. Adults are on the wing year-round in South Africa.

The larvae feed on Acacia species, Ximenia americana and X. afra. They are associated with the ant species Camponotus niveosetosus.

== Subspecies ==
- Axiocerses amanga amanga

Range: South Sudan, Ethiopia, Uganda, Kenya, Tanzania, south-eastern DRC, Angola, Malawi, Zambia, Mozambique, Zimbabwe, Botswana, Namibia, Eswatini and South Africa, where it is present in Limpopo, Mpumalanga, North West, Gauteng and KwaZulu-Natal provinces

- Axiocerses amanga borealis Aurivillius, 1905

Range: Senegal, Mali, Guinea, Burkina Faso, Ivory Coast, Ghana, Togo, Nigeria, Niger, northern Cameroon

- Axiocerses amanga baumi Weymer, 1901

Range: Angola, Namibia
