= Francisco Ximénez =

Domenican priest, administrator, and conservator of Mayan text (1666-c. 1729)

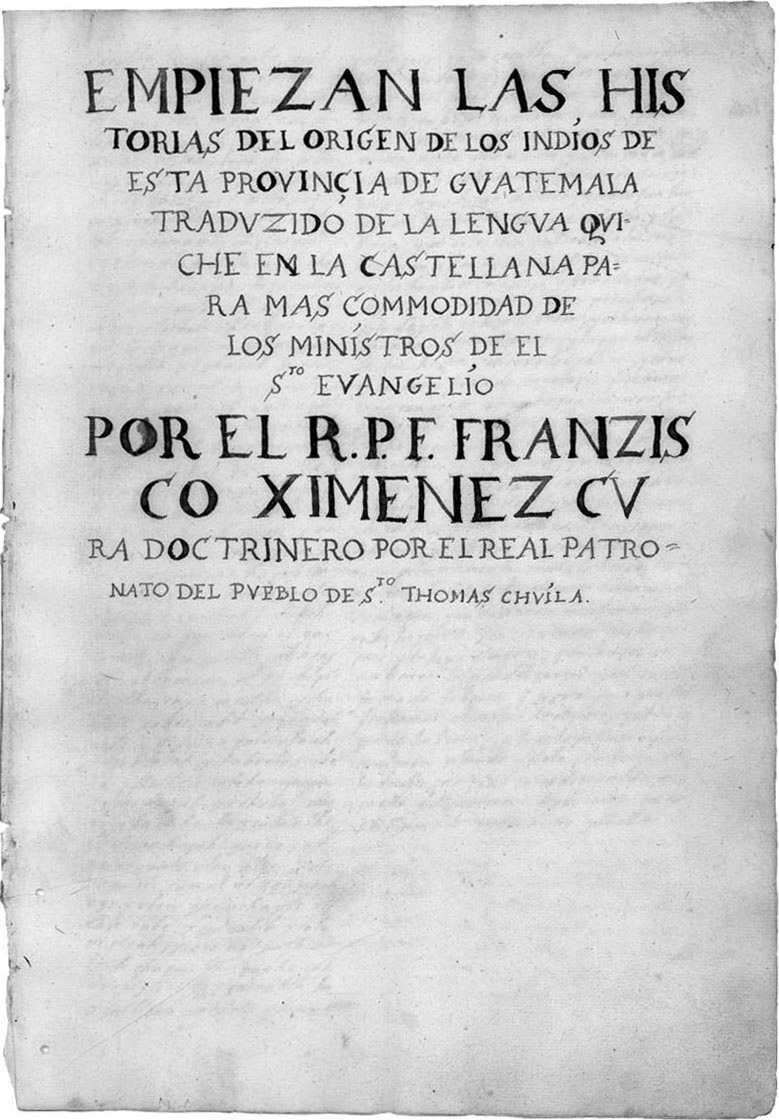
"[Here] begin the histories of the origin of the Indians of this province of Guatemala. Translated from the Quiché language into Castilian for the convenience of the ministers of the holy gospel by the R[everend] P[adre] F[riar] Francísco Ximénez, doctrinal priest of the royal council of Santo Tomás Chilá."

Francísco Ximénez (November 28, 1666 – c. 1729) was a Dominican priest who is known for his conservation of an indigenous Maya narrative known today as the Popol Vuh. John Woodruff has noted that there remain very few biographical data about Ximénez. Aside from the year of his birth, baptismal records do not agree on the actual date of his birth, and the year of his death is less certain, either in late 1729 or early 1730. He enrolled in a seminary in Spain and arrived in the New World in 1688, where he completed his novitiate.

Father Ximénez's sacerdotal service began in 1691 in San Juan Sacatepéquez and San Pedro de las Huertas in present-day Guatemala where he learned Kaqchikel, a Mayan language. In December 1693, Ximénez began serving as the Doctrinero of San Pedro de las Huertas. He continued in this office for at least ten years during which time he was transferred to Santo Tomás Chichicastenango (also known as Chuilá) between 1701–1703. He was also the curate of Rabinal from 1704 to 1714 and further served as the Vicario and Predicador-General of the same district as early as 1705.

His time in Santo Tomás Chichicastenango from 1701 to 1703 is probably when he transcribed and translated the Popol Vuh (see image — Ximénez does not give it its modern title). Later in 1715, Ximénez included a monolingual redaction in his commissioned Historia de la provincia de San Vicente de Chiapa y Gvatemala. He has two other known writings, Primera parte de el tesoro de las lengvas 3a3chiquel Qviche y 4,vtvhil and Historia natural del Reino de Guatemala.

== Legacy ==
Restrepia franciscoximenezii, a species of orchid, is named after Ximénez.

== See also ==
- Ximenia, a genus named after Ximénez
- Ximenic acid, a fatty acid found in Ximenia americana
- Ximenynic acid

== Other Readings ==
- Schumacher, Gudrun; Gregor Wolff (November 2004). Nachlässe, Manuskripte, und Autographen im Besitz des IAI (PDF). Abteilung 2, Referat 1: Nachlässe und Sondersammlungen (in German). Berlin: Ibero-Amerikanisches Institut, Preußischer Kulturbesitz. ISBN 9780520248120. OCLC 162302418. Archived from the original (PDF online document) on 2018-10-08.
