= Neoblastobasis ximeniaella =

Scientific classification
- Domain: Eukaryota
- Kingdom: Animalia
- Phylum: Arthropoda
- Class: Insecta
- Order: Lepidoptera
- Family: Blastobasidae
- Genus: Neoblastobasis
- Species: N. ximeniaella

Binomial name
- Neoblastobasis ximeniaella Adamski, 2010

Species of moth

Neoblastobasis ximeniaella is a moth in the family Blastobasidae. It is found in Kenya, where it is known from coastal lowland habitats in the south-east of the country.

The length of the forewings is 6.1–6.7 mm.

The larvae feed on Ximenia afra and Calophyllum inophyllum.
