= Neoblastobasis perisella =

Scientific classification
- Domain: Eukaryota
- Kingdom: Animalia
- Phylum: Arthropoda
- Class: Insecta
- Order: Lepidoptera
- Family: Blastobasidae
- Genus: Neoblastobasis
- Species: N. perisella

Binomial name
- Neoblastobasis perisella Adamski, 2010

Species of moth

Neoblastobasis perisella is a moth in the family Blastobasidae. It is found in Kenya and the Democratic Republic of the Congo, where it is known from coastal lowland habitats.

The length of the forewings is 5.1–5.5 mm.

The larvae feed on Hugonia castaneifolia and Ximenia afra.

== Etymology ==
The species is named in honour of Peris Machera, a worker in the insect-rearing laboratory in Nairobi, Kenya.
