= Sea lemon =

Sea lemon may refer to:

- a common name for sea slugs or nudibranchs in the taxonomic family Dorididae
- Ximenia americana, a tree species native to Australia and Asia
- Natalie Lew, a Seattle-based musician who performs under the name Sea Lemon
