= Neoblastobasis =

Scientific classification
- Kingdom: Animalia
- Phylum: Arthropoda
- Clade: Pancrustacea
- Class: Insecta
- Order: Lepidoptera
- Family: Blastobasidae
- Genus: Neoblastobasis; Kuznetzov & Sinev, 1985

Type species
- Blastobasis biceratala Park, 1984

Moth genus in family Blastobasidae

Neoblastobasis is a genus of moths in the family Blastobasidae.

== Species ==
- Neoblastobasis biceratala (Park, 1984)
- Neoblastobasis camelliae Chen & Wu, 2013
- Neoblastobasis decolor (Meyrick, 1907)
- Neoblastobasis eurotella Adamski, 2010
- Neoblastobasis laikipiae Adamski, 2010
- Neoblastobasis ligurica Nel & Varenne, 2004
- Neoblastobasis perisella Adamski, 2010
- Neoblastobasis songi Park, Kim & Byun, 2014
- Neoblastobasis spiniharpella Kuznetzov & Sinev, 1985
- Neoblastobasis wangithiae Adamski, 2010
- Neoblastobasis ximeniaella Adamski, 2010
