= Neoblastobasis eurotella =

Scientific classification
- Kingdom: Animalia
- Phylum: Arthropoda
- Clade: Pancrustacea
- Class: Insecta
- Order: Lepidoptera
- Family: Blastobasidae
- Genus: Neoblastobasis
- Species: N. eurotella

Binomial name
- Neoblastobasis eurotella Adamski, 2010

Species of moth

Neoblastobasis eurotella is a moth in the family Blastobasidae. It is found in the United Arab Emirates and Pakistan.
