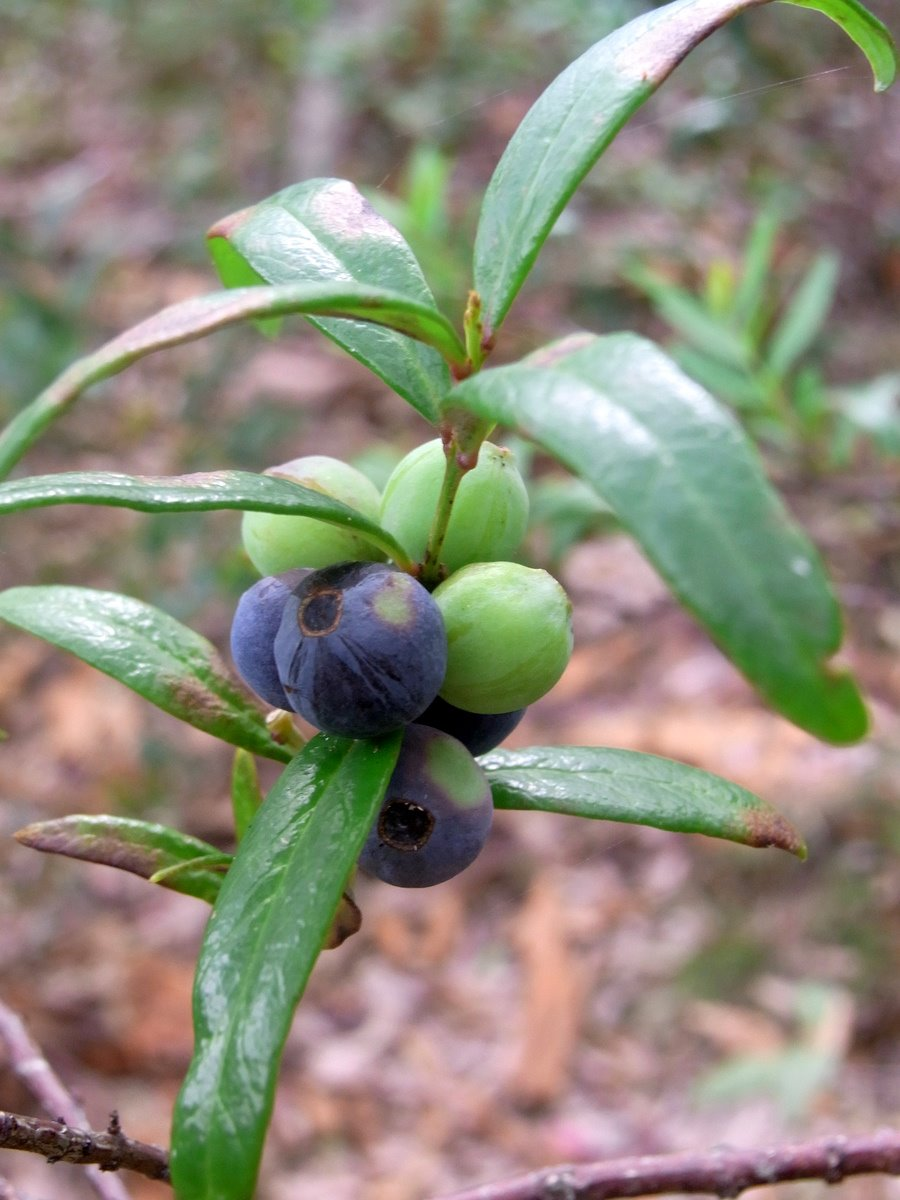
- near Narooma, Australia

Scientific classification
- Kingdom: Plantae
- Clade: Tracheophytes
- Clade: Angiosperms
- Clade: Eudicots
- Order: Santalales
- Family: Santalaceae
- Genus: Santalum
- Species: S. obtusifolium

Binomial name
- Santalum obtusifolium R.Br.

Synonyms
- Fusanus crassifolius

= Santalum obtusifolium =

Species of shrub

Santalum obtusifolium, known as the sandalwood or blunt sandalwood, is a shrub found in eastern Australia. Often seen around a metre tall, it may grow to 2.5 metres high. Seen in eucalyptus forests and woodlands, often by creeks and usually not far from the sea. It grows in moderate to high rainfall areas such as Royal and Lamington National Parks. Growing as far from the coast as Yarrowitch, Megalong Valley and Braidwood in New South Wales.

Unlike other sandalwood species, little is known of its fruit, wood, or other uses. However, there are reports the fruit is edible. According to Butaud 2008, there is Ximenynic acid (71.5%) and Oleic acid (14.3%) in the fruit kernels.

The specific epithet obtusifolium is from Latin, and it refers to the blunt leaves. This plant first appeared in the scientific literature in 1810, in the Prodromus Florae Novae Hollandiae, authored by the prolific Scottish botanist, Robert Brown.
