= Neoblastobasis laikipiae =

Scientific classification
- Kingdom: Animalia
- Phylum: Arthropoda
- Clade: Pancrustacea
- Class: Insecta
- Order: Lepidoptera
- Family: Blastobasidae
- Genus: Neoblastobasis
- Species: N. laikipiae

Binomial name
- Neoblastobasis laikipiae Adamski, 2010

Species of moth

Neoblastobasis laikipiae is a moth in the family Blastobasidae. It is found in Kenya, where it is known from the Laikipia Plateau (the eastern escarpment of the Rift Valley).

The length of the forewings is 6.3 mm. The hindwings are pale grey.
