= Neoblastobasis wangithiae =

Scientific classification
- Kingdom: Animalia
- Phylum: Arthropoda
- Clade: Pancrustacea
- Class: Insecta
- Order: Lepidoptera
- Family: Blastobasidae
- Genus: Neoblastobasis
- Species: N. wangithiae

Binomial name
- Neoblastobasis wangithiae Adamski, 2010

Species of moth

Neoblastobasis wangithiae is a moth in the family Blastobasidae. It is found in Kenya, where it is known from coastal lowland habitats in the southeast of the country.

The length of the forewings is 4.1 mm.
