= Neoblastobasis spiniharpella =

Scientific classification
- Kingdom: Animalia
- Phylum: Arthropoda
- Clade: Pancrustacea
- Class: Insecta
- Order: Lepidoptera
- Family: Blastobasidae
- Genus: Neoblastobasis
- Species: N. spiniharpella

Binomial name
- Neoblastobasis spiniharpella (Kuznetzov & Sinev, 1985)

Synonyms
- Blastobasis spiniharpella Kuznetzov & Sinev, 1985; Lateantenna spiniharpella (Kuznetzov & Sinev, 1985)

Species of moth

Neoblastobasis spiniharpella is a moth in the family Blastobasidae. It was described by Vladimir Ivanovitsch Kuznetzov and Sergej Yurjevitsch Sinev in 1985. It is found in Korea, Russia and Japan.

Larvae have been recorded feeding on Quercus (oak) cones.
