= Lumequeic acid =

Names
- IUPAC name (Z)-triacont-21-enoic acid
- Other names 21-Triacontenoic acid

Identifiers
CAS Number	67329-09-3
3D model (JSmol)	Interactive image
ChemSpider	4445904
PubChem CID	5282777
UNII	1M7194DPR1
CompTox Dashboard (EPA)	DTXSID501310136
- InChI: InChI=1S/C30H58O2/c1-2-3-4-5-6-7-8-9-10-11-12-13-14-15-16-17-18-19-20-21-22-23-24-25-26-27-28-29-30(31)32/h9-10H,2-8,11-29H2,1H3,(H,31,32)/b10-9- Key: QXYCISFUJXCMSU-KTKRTIGZSA-N
- SMILES: CCCCCCCC/C=C\CCCCCCCCCCCCCCCCCCCC(=O)O

Properties
Chemical formula	C_{30}H_{58}O_{2}
Molar mass	450.792 g·mol^{−1}
Melting point	50.5–50.9 °C (122.9–123.6 °F; 323.6–324.0 K)
Solubility in water	soluble
- Except where otherwise noted, data are given for materials in their standard state (at 25 °C [77 °F], 100 kPa). Infobox references

Lumequeic acid is a chemical compound with the chemical formula C_{30}H_{58}O_{2}. Its delta notation is Δ21-30:1. This is a monounsaturated fatty acid and very long chain fatty acid with a 30-carbon chain with a cis-configured double bond at the 21st position.

The acid has been found in Ximenia americana (yellowplum). The genus is named after the Spanish priest Francisco Ximénez (1666–1729). Also, the acid has been identified in cured vanilla beans (Vanilla planifolia species). The lumequeic acid is named after lumeque seed of West African Ximenia species.

== Synthesis ==
=== Synthetic method ===
Lumequic acid synthesis involves extending shorter fatty acids by adding carbon units using enzymes or chemical catalysts, leading to the creation of very long-chain fatty acids.

=== Industrial method ===
Industrial-scale production of this compound relies on biotechnological methods, specifically microbial fermentation. The process involves genetically engineering microorganisms to produce the desired fatty acid, a method chosen for its efficiency and environmental sustainability.

== Uses ==
The acid is primarily used in biochemical research, pharmaceutical development, and environmental science.
