= Neoblastobasis biceratala =

Scientific classification
- Kingdom: Animalia
- Phylum: Arthropoda
- Clade: Pancrustacea
- Class: Insecta
- Order: Lepidoptera
- Family: Blastobasidae
- Genus: Neoblastobasis
- Species: N. biceratala

Binomial name
- Neoblastobasis biceratala (Park, 1984)

Synonyms
- Blastobasis biceratala Park, 1984; Neoblastobasis lativalvella Kuznetzov & Sinev, 1985

Species of moth

Neoblastobasis biceratala is a moth in the family Blastobasidae. It was described by Kyu-Tek Park in 1984. It is found in South Korea, Russia and Japan.
