= Restrepia franciscoximenezii =

Scientific classification
- Kingdom: Plantae
- Clade: Tracheophytes
- Clade: Angiosperms
- Clade: Monocots
- Order: Asparagales
- Family: Orchidaceae
- Subfamily: Epidendroideae
- Genus: Restrepia
- Species: R. franciscoximenezii

Binomial name
- Restrepia franciscoximenezii Archila & Chiron

Species of flowering plant

Restrepia franciscoximenezii is a species of flowering plant in the family Orchidaceae. It is an epiphyte native to Guatemala.

The species was described in 2022, and named after Francisco Ximénez.

== Taxonomy ==
The species was described in 2022, by Fredy Archila and Guy Robert Chiron. The type material was collected by Archila, in Cobán, from an elevation of 1,300 metres (4,300 ft).

== Distribution ==
Restrepia franciscoximenezii is native to the wet tropical biome of Guatemala.

== Etymology ==
The specific epithet refers to Francisco Ximénez. Ximénez authored the Historia Natural del Reino de Guatemala, which describes the orchids of Guatemala.
