= Ximenic acid =

Names
- IUPAC name (17Z)-hexacos-17-enoic acid
- Other names cis-17-hexacosenoic acid

Identifiers
CAS Number	66274-43-9
3D model (JSmol)	Interactive image
ChEBI	CHEBI:77525
ChemSpider	4471996
KEGG	C17278
PubChem CID	5282775
UNII	42346MM00R
CompTox Dashboard (EPA)	DTXSID701025800
- InChI: InChI=1S/C26H50O2/c1-2-3-4-5-6-7-8-9-10-11-12-13-14-15-16-17-18-19-20-21-22-23-24-25-26(27)28/h9-10H,2-8,11-25H2,1H3,(H,27,28)/b10-9- Key: RQIDQEBURXNDKG-KTKRTIGZSA-N
- SMILES: CCCCCCCC/C=C\CCCCCCCCCCCCCCCC(O)=O

Properties
Chemical formula	C_{26}H_{50}O_{2}
Molar mass	394.684 g·mol^{−1}
Melting point	50.5–50.9 °C (122.9–123.6 °F; 323.6–324.0 K)
Solubility in water	soluble
- Except where otherwise noted, data are given for materials in their standard state (at 25 °C [77 °F], 100 kPa). Infobox references

Ximenic acid is a chemical compound with the chemical formula C_{26}H_{50}O_{2}. Its delta notation is Δ17-26:1. This is a monounsaturated fatty acid and very long chain fatty acid with 26 carbon atoms and one double bond found on the 9th carbon atom from the end. The compound has the double bond at the ninth carbon atom; therefore, ximenic acid belongs to the Omega-9 group of acids.

== Discovery ==
The acid was initially isolated by scientists S. V. Puntambekar and S. Krishna in 1937.

The acid has been found in Ximenia americana (yellowplum). The genus is named after the Spanish priest Francisco Ximénez (1666–1729). The compound was also isolated from Tropaeolum speciosum and certain fish oil lipids and sponges.

== Uses ==
The acid is primarily used in skincare products for its purported dermatological benefits.

== See also ==
- Ximenynic acid
