= Myristoleic acid =

14-Carbon monounsaturated fatty acid

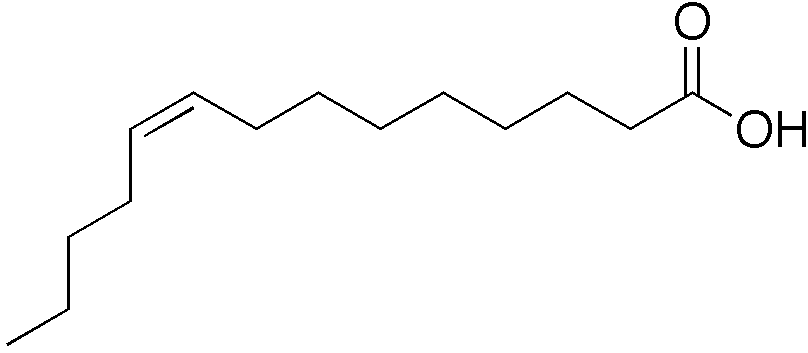

Names
- Preferred IUPAC name (9Z)-Tetradec-9-enoic acid
- Other names 9-Tetradecenoic acid 9-cis-Tetradecenoic acid cis-Δ^{9}-Tetradecenoic acid Myristolenic acid Oleomyristic acid

Identifiers
CAS Number	544-64-9
3D model (JSmol)	Interactive image
ChEBI	CHEBI:27781
ChemSpider	4444564
ECHA InfoCard	100.008.070
PubChem CID	5281119
UNII	RF23WGD123
CompTox Dashboard (EPA)	DTXSID5041568
- InChI: InChI=1S/C14H26O2/c1-2-3-4-5-6-7-8-9-10-11-12-13-14(15)16/h5-6H,2-4,7-13H2,1H3,(H,15,16)/b6-5- Key: YWWVWXASSLXJHU-WAYWQWQTSA-N; InChI=1/C14H26O2/c1-2-3-4-5-6-7-8-9-10-11-12-13-14(15)16/h5-6H,2-4,7-13H2,1H3,(H,15,16)/b6-5- Key: YWWVWXASSLXJHU-WAYWQWQTBZ
- SMILES: O=C(O)CCCCCCC\C=C/CCCC

Properties
Chemical formula	C_{14}H_{26}O_{2}
Molar mass	226.360 g·mol^{−1}
- Except where otherwise noted, data are given for materials in their standard state (at 25 °C [77 °F], 100 kPa). verify (what is ?) Infobox references

Myristoleic acid, or 9-tetradecenoic acid, is an omega-5 fatty acid. It is biosynthesized from myristic acid by the enzyme Stearoyl-CoA desaturase-1, but it is uncommon in nature. One of the major sources of this fatty acid is the seed oil from plants of the family Myristicaceae, comprising up to 30 per cent of the oil in some species. It is a constituent of Serenoa or Saw palmetto, and appears to have activity against LNCaP prostate-cancer cells.

== See also ==
- Cetyl myristoleate
