= Ximenia roigii =

Conservation status
- Critically Endangered (IUCN 3.1)

Scientific classification
- Kingdom: Plantae
- Clade: Tracheophytes
- Clade: Angiosperms
- Clade: Eudicots
- Order: Santalales
- Family: Olacaceae
- Genus: Ximenia
- Species: X. roigii

Binomial name
- Ximenia roigii León

Species of flowering plant

Ximenia roigii is a species of flowering plant in the family Olacaceae. It is endemic to Cuba. It is threatened by habitat loss.

== Description ==
Ximenia roigii is a thorny shrub or small tree. The branches bear thorns up to 1.6 cm (0.63 in) long. Its leaves are obovate shaped, and are sparse and scattered along the branches. They range from 1.5–4 cm (0.59–1.57 in) long and 1.5–2.2 cm (0.59–0.87 in) broad, and are connected to the branches by petioles which are 3–5 mm (0.12–0.20 in) long.

Only the male flowers of the plant are known to scientists. They are borne in inflorescences consisting of two to six flowers arranged in umbels or cymes. The flowers consist of four petals, four sepals, and eight stamens. The fruit is a drupe, 2 cm (0.79 in) long and 1.2 cm (0.47 in) with ellipsoid seeds 1.6 by 0.9 cm (0.63 by 0.35 in).

== Taxonomy ==
The species was first described by French-born Cuban botanist Frère León in 1948 based on a collection by Juan Tomás Roíg y Mesa,a Cuban botanist.

Common names include almendro de costa and zarza limón.

== Distribution ==
Ximenia roigii is found in coastal xeromorphic scrub and thorny xeromorphic scrub on serpentine soils, in Camagüey and Las Tunas provinces in central Cuba, and in Holguín and Guantánamo provinces in eastern Cuba.

== Conservation ==
Ximenia roigii was classified as critical endangered by the IUCN in 2024, based on the fact that only six populations were known, consisting of 49 mature individuals occupying 2.2 km^{2} (0.85 mi^{2}). The population is threatened by deforestation, fires and grazing.

The species is found in the Refugio de Fauna Bahía de Malagueta, but no recovery plans or ex-situ conservation populations exist.
