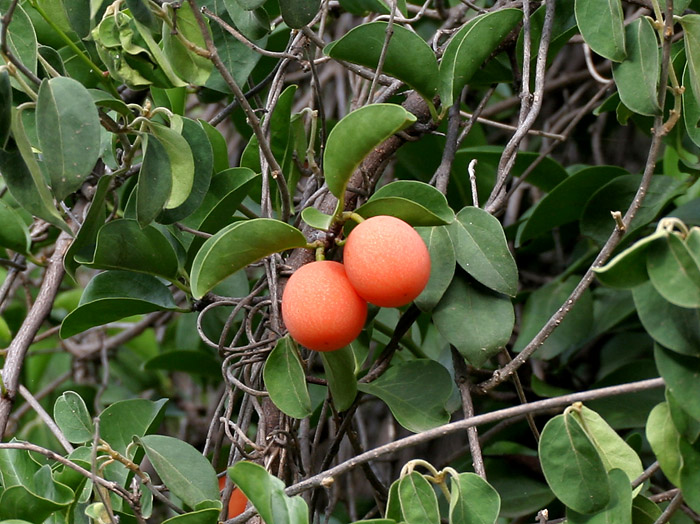

Conservation status
- Least Concern (IUCN 3.1)

Scientific classification
- Kingdom: Plantae
- Clade: Tracheophytes
- Clade: Angiosperms
- Clade: Eudicots
- Order: Santalales
- Family: Olacaceae
- Genus: Ximenia
- Species: X. americana

Binomial name
- Ximenia americana L.
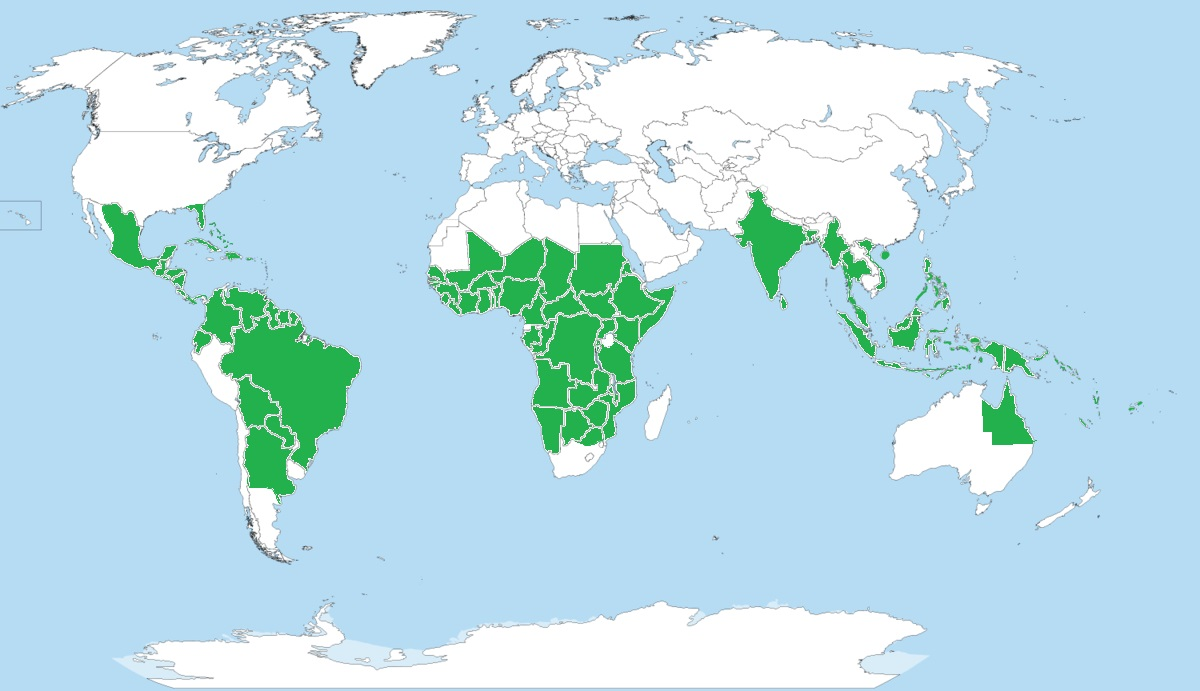
- Range of X. americana throughout the world (in green)

Synonyms
- List: Heymassoli inermis Aubl.; Heymassoli spinosa Aubl.; Ximenia aculeata Crantz; Ximenia americana var. argentinensis DeFilipps; Ximenia americana f. inermis (Aubl.) Engl.; Ximenia americana var. oblonga DC.; Ximenia americana var. ovata DC.; Ximenia arborescens Tussac ex Walp.; Ximenia elliptica G.Forst.; Ximenia exarmata F.Muell.; Ximenia fluminensis M.Roem.; Ximenia gabonensis Baill. ex Laness.; Ximenia inermis L.; Ximenia laurina Delile; Ximenia loranthifolia Span.; Ximenia montana Macfad.; Ximenia multiflora Jacq.; Ximenia oblonga Lam. ex Hemsl.; Ximenia rogersii Burtt Davy; Ximenia russeliana Wall.; Ximenia spinosa (Aubl.) Lam. ex Forsyth f.; Ximenia subscandens Griff.; Ximenia verrucosa M.Roem.; Ziziphus littorea Teijsm. ex Hassk.

= Ximenia americana =

Species of tree

Ximenia americana, commonly known as tallow wood, hog plum, yellow plum, sea lemon, or pi'ut (Chamorro), is bush-forming shrub/small tree; a species from the Ximenia genus in the Olacaceae family. It is mainly found in the tropics, ranging from Africa, India and southeast Asia, to Australia, New Zealand, Pacific Islands, West Indies, Central, North and South America. It is especially common in Africa and South America. It is not domesticated so it is only found occurring in the wild.

They grow in areas with more than 500 mm of mean annual rainfall and up to heights of 2000 m. It is commonly found in a variety of diverse habitats ranging from dry woodlands, hilly areas to coastal bushlands, along riverbanks, and mangroves They are commonly found in poor and dry soil types. The plant has not been domesticated; as such, it only occurs in the wild.

== Description ==
=== Tree ===
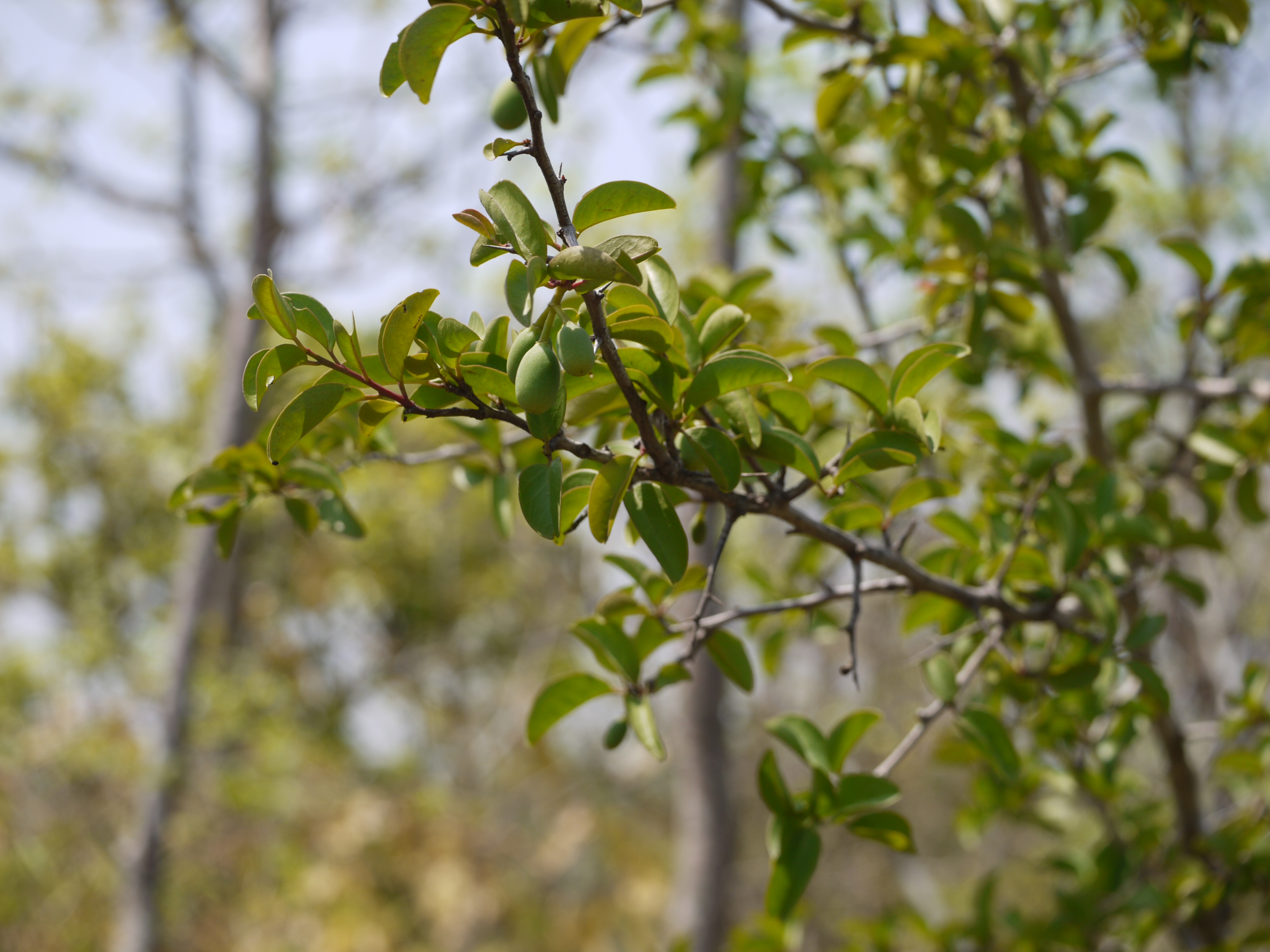
A branch of X. americana

Ximenia americana is a semiscandent plant that grows as a bush-forming shrub or small tree to between a height of 2–7 metres (6.6–23.0 ft), although plants being less than 4m (13 feet) are more commonly observed. The trunk has a diameter of less than 10 cm (4 in); the bark has a colour of dark brown to pale gray. The branches form an arch downwards and the branchlets have straight, thin spines that are 1 cm long, protruding out of it, and are coloured purple-red with a waxy bloom.

=== Leaves ===
Leaves are simple, alternate or clustered on spur shoots, having a lanceolate (spear-like) to elliptic (oval) shape, are either obtuse, emarginate or retuse at the apex, and have a texture similar to leather. The leaves grow up to 2.5 to 8 cm (1 to 3 in) long and 1 to 4 cm (0.4 to 1.6 in) wide, have a thickness ranging from thin to semisucculent and have 3 to 7 pairs of lateral veins that are difficult to observe on both sides of the leaf. They curve upwards along the midrib.

Leaves are hairy as they first start growing, but become smooth and shiny as they mature. The petioles are short and thin, growing up to 3 to 6 mm (0.1 to 0.3 in) long. They are canaliculated, smooth and have a grey-green or bright green colour and flesh that is either leathery or thin. They release a strong smell like almonds when crushed.

=== Flowers and fruit ===
Flowering is commonly observed during dry seasons. The flowers are fragrant, small, coloured white, yellow-green or pink and are about 5 to 10 mm (0.2 to 0.4 in) long. They grow on branched inflorescences, which are either pedunculate racemose or umbelliform cymes, that are on pedicles 3-7mm long. Fruits are shaped globose, subglobose, drupaceous or ellipisoid, grow up to 3 cm long, have a diameter of 2.5 cm and are smooth.

The trees produce fruit after about 3 years of growing. Young fruits are green but turn golden-yellow or yellow (and rarely orangish-red) as they ripen, climatic conditions do not affect their maturation. When ripe, the fruit has a green, juicy pulp, and one large endospermic seed, that has a small embryo and thin testa. The seed is woody and coloured light-yellow and grows up to 1.5 cm long with a diameter of 1.2 cm, and has about 60% oil content. The fruit is "refreshing" when eaten and is said to have "an almond-acid taste". The seeds are then dispersed by animals that eat the fruit.

Plant Morphology

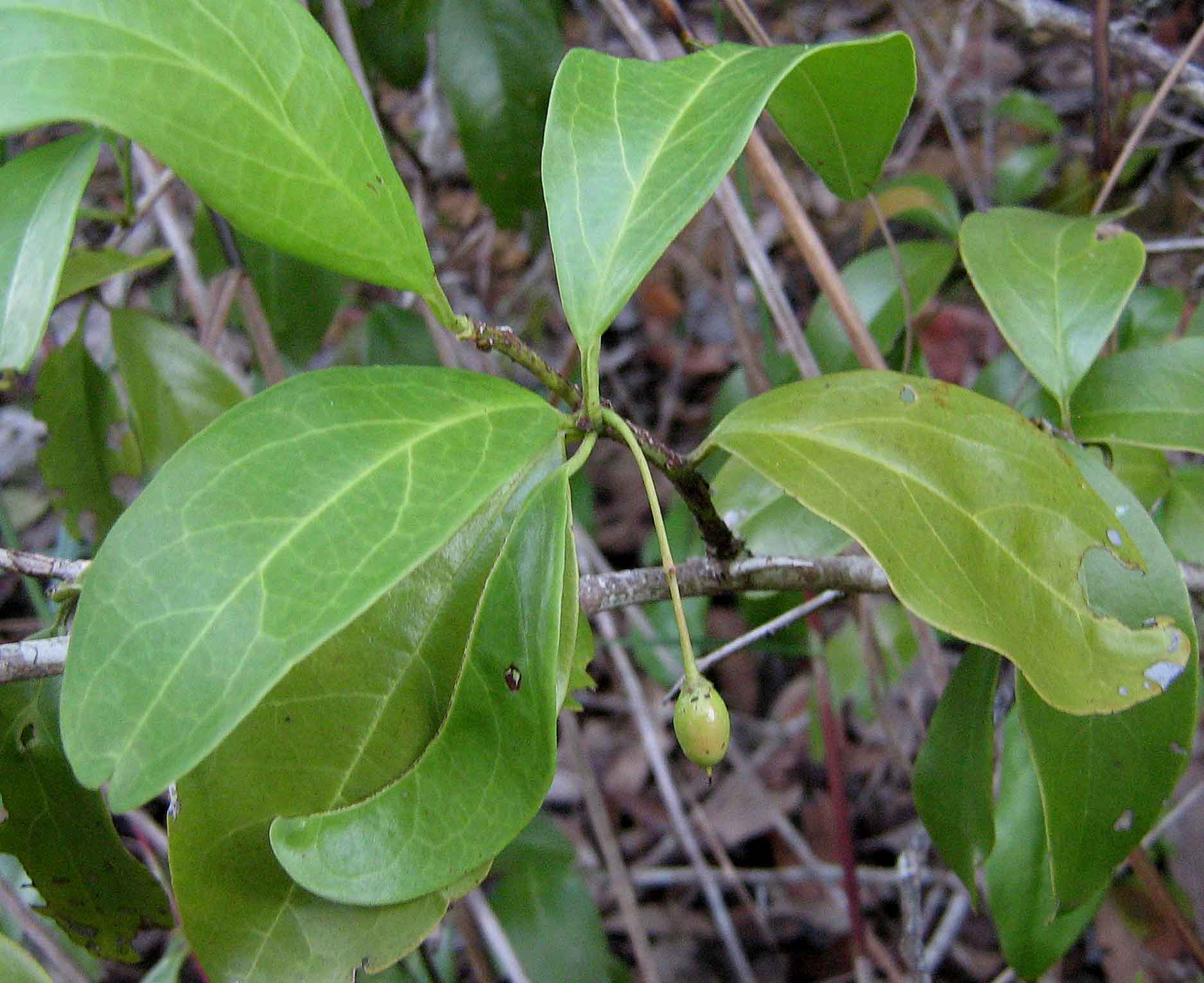
Leaves of Ximenia americana

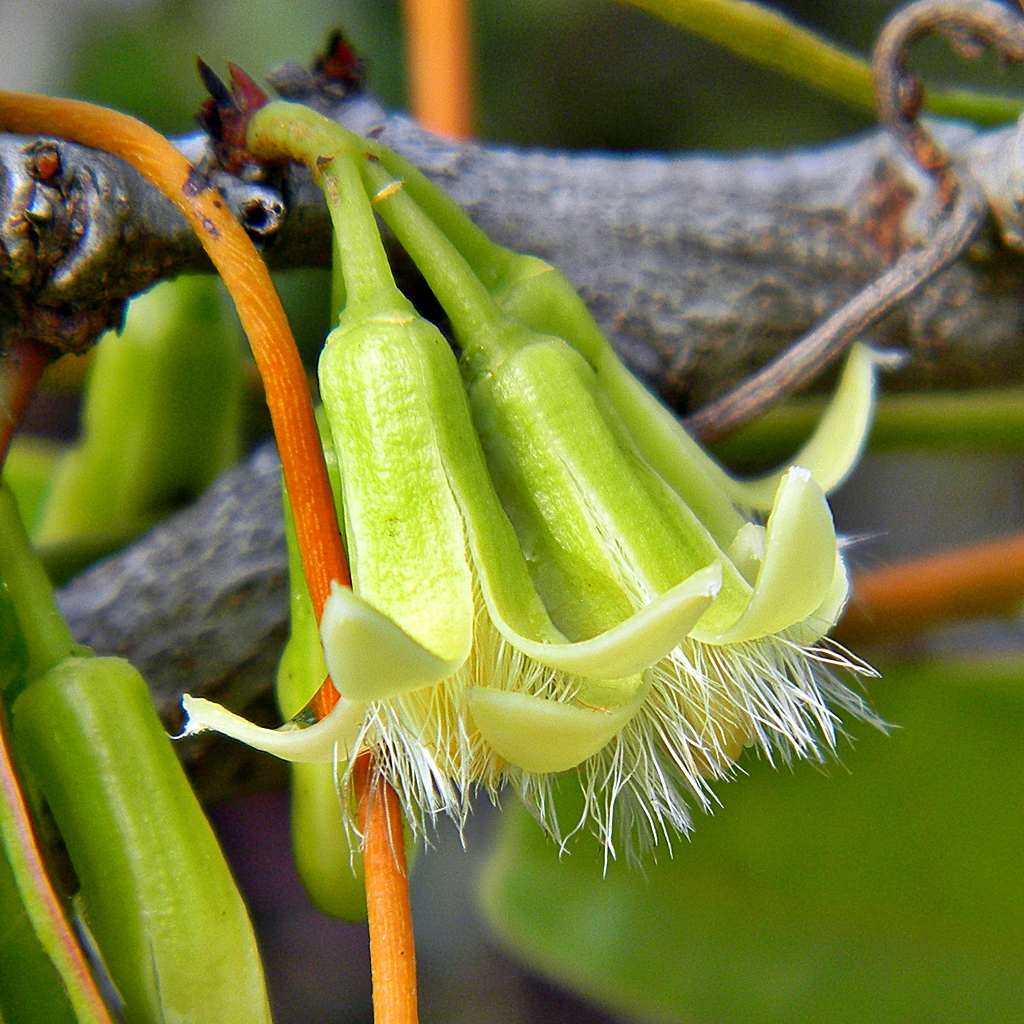
Flowers of Ximenia americana

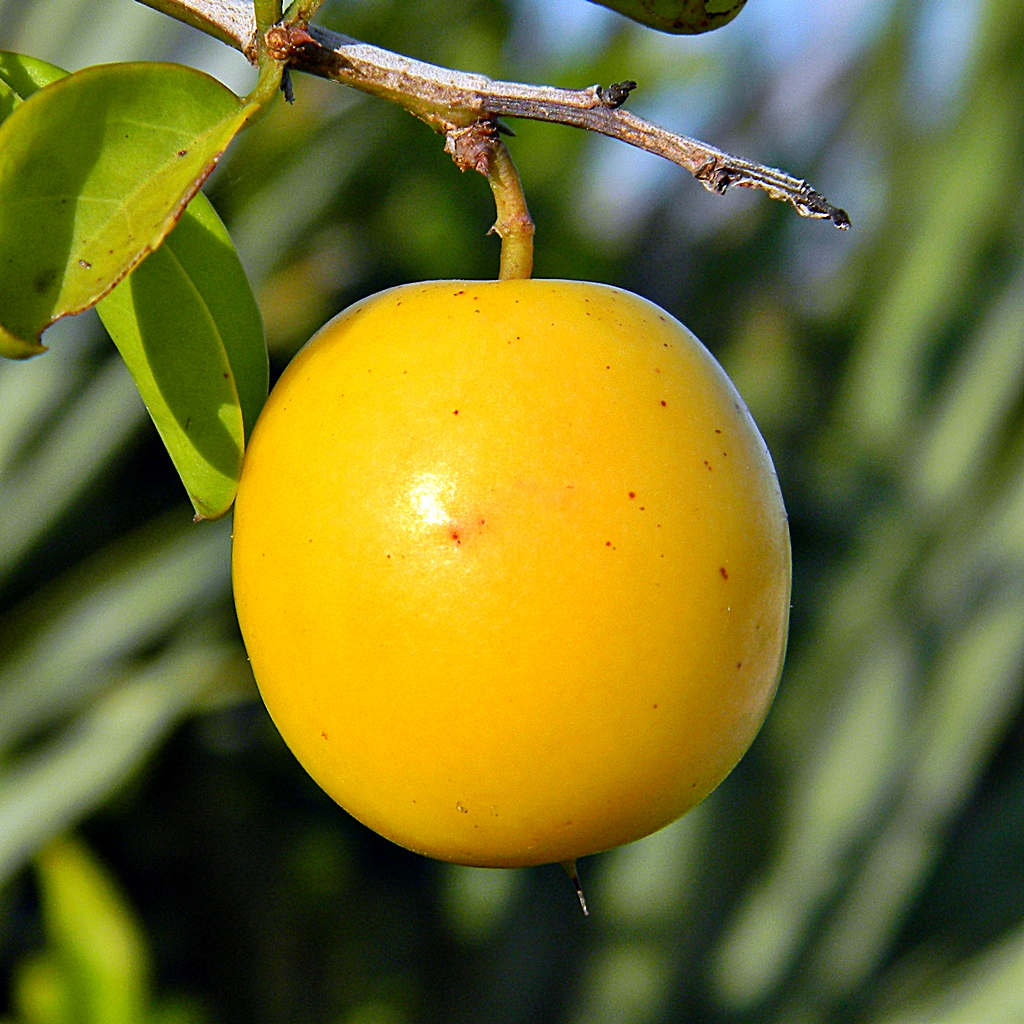
Fruit of Ximenia americana

Ximenia americana is similar to the plant Ximenia afra, another species in the Ximenia genus. However, X. americana's leaves and fruits are smaller than X. afra's making it easy to distinguish between the two. X. americana also bears several flowers on inflorescences that are branched whereas the flowers in X. afra are borne in tufts or singularly, marking another difference between both of these species.

=== Phytochemistry ===
Fatty acids and glycerides are abundantly available in X.americana. Further classes of chemical compounds found in X. americana includes alkaloids, anthraquinones, glycosides, flavonoids, glycosides, phenolic compounds, phlobatannins, quinones, saponins, tannins, and terpenoids. Leaves collected from X. americana in southern Niger were found to be rich in calcium, iron, magnesium, and manganese content but were also noted to be lacking protein. Linolenate was also detected in the leaves, along with high levels of palmitate.

Vitamin C content varies according to maturity of the plant, with the green fruits having 74% more than the mature, yellow fruits. The seed of the fruit contains cyanide derivatives and high levels of riproximin were noted in the fruit kernels. The seed oil was observed to contain the compounds ximenic, linolenic, linoleic, and stearic acids along with smaller amounts of lumequic, ximenynic, arachidonic, erucic, and nervonic acids and a variety of other compounds. The volatile oil of the leaves were observed to be consisted of benzaldehyde (63.5%), hydroxybenzyl cyanide (13%) and isophorone (3.5%), the cyanide content contributes to the aforementioned almond-like smell of leaves.

== Taxonomy ==
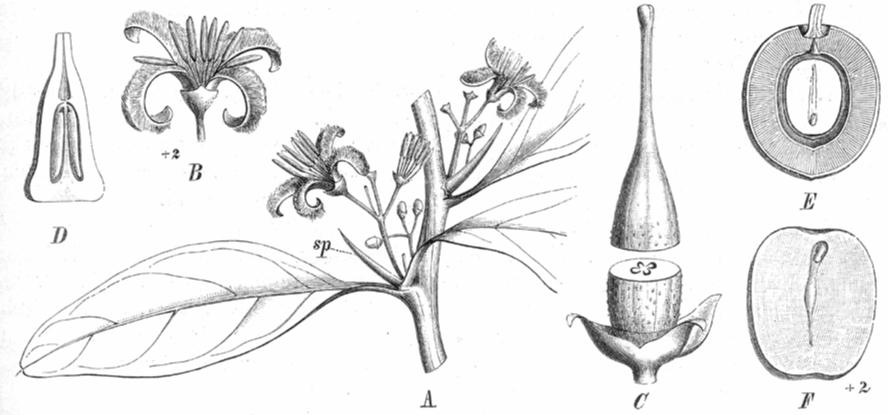
Illustrations of X. americana in Die Natürlichen Pflanzenfamilien (1894)

Jean Baptiste Christophore Fusée Aublet published occurrences of Heymassoli inermis and Heymassoli spinosa in Histoire des Plantes de la Guiane Françoise in 1775, which were then later identified as X. americana. The latter, Heymassoli spinosa, became the basionym for Ximenia spinosa which was published in A Botanical nomenclator : containing a systematical arrangement of the classes, orders, genera, and species of plants as described in the new edition of Linnæsus's Systema naturæ, by Dr. Gmelin by William Jr. Forsyth in 1794.

Ximenia americana belongs to the Ximenia genus, along with 7 other species, that all belong to the Olacaceae family. The term Ximenia comes from the Spanish priest, Francisco Ximenez, who detailed a collection of plants found in Mexico in the 17th century. The species name, Americana, meaning "of America", is an indication of where the plant had been 'first' collected.

Common names of the plant include "seaside plum", "small sourplum", "wild plum", "blue sour plum", "hog plum", "sour plum", "false sandalwood", "tallow nut", "tallow wood", "wild olivein", and "wild lime" in English; "chabbuli" and "ysada" in west Africa; "ghène", "n'ghani" and "léaman" in Ivory Coast; and "kleinsuurpruim", "inkoy", "mutente", "kol", "mulebe", "mungomba", "musongwasongwa", "mulutulwa", "museka", "ntogé", "nogbé", "séno", "séné", "madarud", and "madarau" in other regions in Africa; "ameixa-da-terra", "ameixa", "ameixeira-do-Brasil", "ameixa-brava", "ameixa-da-Baía", "ameixa-de-espinho", "ameixa-do-Pará", "ameixeira-do-Pará", and "muirapuama" in Brazil"; "hicaco", "espino de brujo", "ciruelillo", "caimito de monte", "cagalero", "albaricoque", "albaria", "tigrito", and "almendro de costa" in Spanish; and "citron de mer", "cerise de mer", "croc", "macaby", and "prunier de mer" in French.

== Distribution and habitat ==
It is found in many habitats, predominantly in semi-arid bushlands and in dry and moist woodlands, sandy open woodlands, dry hilly areas, coastal bushlands, countrysides, shrub savannahs, forest lands and along watercourses such as riverbanks and stony slopes. X. americana occurs in altitudes up to 2000 m (6562 ft) and where mean annual rainfall is more than 500 mm. It grows on many soil types such as clay soils, clay muddy, silt sandy; however, it is mostly observed growing on poor and dry soil. It can also absorb nutrients and water from other plant species through its roots, however, it does not use this method as its mode of survival.

== Ecology ==
Ximenia americana is a long-lived perennial and is found present in savannahs, one of their natural habitats, and are vital food sources for animals living in the same habitats, namely mammals like giraffes, who depend on the leaves of X. americana for its food. The leaves are also eaten by insects, such as butterflies, and their larvae, documented species being Axiocerses amanga (the bush scarlet), Stugeta bowkeri (the Bowker's sapphire) and Hypolycaena philippus (the purple-brown hairstreak). The vibrant colours of the fruit, which is oftentimes produced in large amounts during the early summer, attracts birds, such as bulbuls, starlings, and barbets, and other wildlife to feed on the fruit.

The flowers are known attract many insect pollinators, namely bees. Documented bees include Agapostemon splendens (the brown-winged striped-sweat bee), Apis mellifera (the western honey bee), Augochloropsis sumptuosa, Coelioxys germana, Dialictus placidensis, Megachile mendica (the Flat-tailed Leaf-cutter Bee) and Melissodes communis (the common long-horned bee).

Ximenia americana can be classified as a facultative hemiparasite, due to its tendency to live off the roots of other nearby host species, but not as a way of survival as it can perfectly grow without a host. Due to this it can grow better in soil where it can come into contact with the roots of other plants. It can also attach to objects such as plastic or rocks.

== Conservation ==
The IUCN red-list declared Ximenia americana as a "Least Concern" plant. This is mainly due to the wide distribution and large population of X. americana all over the world. No major threats have been identified to the species currently and in the future. This assessment was carried out by the IUCN SSC Global Tree Specialist Group and the Botanic Gardens Conservation International (BGCI) in 2018.

However, researchers in Ethiopia have noticed the plant becoming rare in their respective study areas, mainly due to the overuse of the plant and its components. They have suggested the rehabilitation of the plants, mainly by domestication, in hopes of conserving the species in those specific areas.

== Cultivation ==
There have been no recorded cases of the domestication of X. americana. However, it is noted that Ximenia americana can easily propagated by planting fresh seeds in a mixture of 5 parts soil and 1 part compost. Germination is usually observed 14 to 30 days after the seed has been planted. The plant grows about 0.5 m (1.6 ft) every year, a moderate growth rate. It can grow on loamy, clay soil, and other types of poor and dry soil and is adaptable to changes in soil pH. It is drought-resistant, making it a good source of food during dry periods. It is also tolerant of mild flooding, that occur during storms or floods, for short periods of time. It is also mildly tolerant of salty soil types and salt sprays and winds. Due to the semiparasitic roots, it grows well around other plants and is best grown next a host like oak.

== Toxicity ==
Leaves containing the cyanogenic glycoside sambunigrin at 100 ppm were noted to be fatal for the freshwater snail, Bulinus globus, the species responsible for causing the disease schistosomiasis. Researchers noted that X. americana extract had no deaths when the toxic effects of the extract of the plant for 14 days, however, after an oral administration of 2000 mg.kg−1, forced breathing and analgesia in the animals were noted. Another study was conducted on the effects of the liquid extracts of the root, stem and leaves of X. americana on the blood and the liver, and damage to the cells of the liver were noted.

== Uses ==
=== Food ===
Ximenia americana can be utilized as a food source, mainly its fruit, which can be eaten raw or pickled, and can be used to replace lemon in fish recipes, make juice, jams or intoxicating drinks; In South Africa, a kind of beer is made from the fruits. The kernel of the fruit can be made into oil, which is used in cooking as a substitute for butter or ghee. The nuts have a strong purgative effect, and should not be eaten in large amounts. In Asia, the young leaves are cooked as a vegetable. However, the leaves also contain cyanide and need to be thoroughly cooked, and should not be eaten in large amounts.

=== Cosmetics ===
The seed of X. americana's fruit can be crushed to produce oil. This oil (ximenyinc acid) is then for a variety of cosmetic purposes such as emollients, conditioners, skin softeners, body and hair oils, as well as ingredients in soaps, lipsticks and lubricants.

Essential oils can also be obtained from the heartwood and flowers from X. americana, which are then used for fumigations and as a substitute for orange blossom respectively.

=== Fuel ===
The wood is used as firewood and charcoal. X. americana's seed oil can be used as a potential biofuel when blended with kerosene.

=== Traditional medicine ===
Methods of using X. americana in traditional medicine include infusion, decoction, syrup, cataplasm, or as a tincture.

=== Crude extract ===
Xymelys 45 containing X. americana bark extract is marketed as a cosmetic, and the seed oil is marketed for dry skin conditions.

=== Horticulture ===
The species is also used as a border and boundary, if it is cultivated as a hedge plant properly. The plant can also be used for decoration purposes as it has attractive flowers and foliage.
