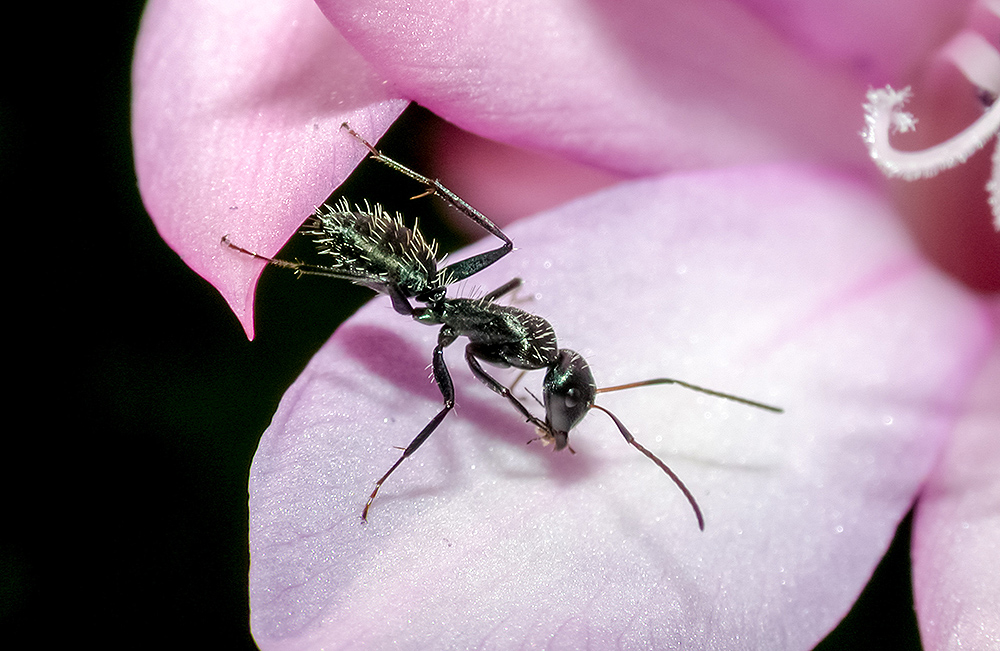
- Visiting a Watsonia flower

Scientific classification
- Kingdom: Animalia
- Phylum: Arthropoda
- Clade: Pancrustacea
- Class: Insecta
- Order: Hymenoptera
- Family: Formicidae
- Subfamily: Formicinae
- Genus: Camponotus
- Subgenus: Myrmopiromis
- Species: C. niveosetosus

Binomial name
- Camponotus niveosetosus Mayr, 1862

= Camponotus niveosetosus =

Hairy sugar ant

Species of ant

Camponotus niveosetosus, commonly known as the hairy sugar ant, is one of the smaller species of sugar ant. It is native to an extensive region in the eastern Afrotropics.

== Description ==
They are dark grey to black in colour, with tellingly, copious stiff, almost snow-white hairs on the thorax and gaster. The antennae and tarsi are ferruginous, and the mandibles dark castaneous red. In addition to the thick and blunt white pilosity it is covered with a more yellowish, short and fine, decumbent pubescence.

== Range and habitat ==
They are found from Kenya to South Africa in a variety of habitats. Only arid regions seem to be avoided. They are found in gardens, fynbos, grassland, savanna and various types of woodland, from the intertidal zone at sea level to middle altitudes.

== Subspecies ==
Three subspecies are recognized:

- Camponotus niveosetosus niveosetosus – continental Africa, type from South Africa
- Camponotus niveosetosus irredux Forel, 1910 – continental Africa, type from South Africa
- Camponotus niveosetosus madagascarensis Forel, 1886 – Madagascar
