= Ximenynic acid =

Names
- Preferred IUPAC name (11E)-Octadec-11-en-9-ynoic acid
- Other names Santalbic acid

Identifiers
CAS Number	557-58-4
3D model (JSmol)	Interactive image
ChemSpider	83781
ECHA InfoCard	100.008.346
EC Number	209-179-1
PubChem CID	5312688
UNII	IA0Z48P13W
CompTox Dashboard (EPA)	DTXSID501317249
- InChI: InChI=1S/C18H30O2/c1-2-3-4-5-6-7-8-9-10-11-12-13-14-15-16-17-18(19)20/h7-8H,2-6,11-17H2,1H3,(H,19,20)/b8-7+ Key: VENIIVIRETXKSV-BQYQJAHWSA-N
- SMILES: CCCCCCC=CC#CCCCCCCCC(=O)O

Properties
Chemical formula	C_{18}H_{30}O_{2}
Molar mass	278.436 g·mol^{−1}
- Except where otherwise noted, data are given for materials in their standard state (at 25 °C [77 °F], 100 kPa). Infobox references

Ximenynic acid is trans-11-octadecen-9-ynoic acid, a long-chain acetylenic fatty acid.

== Discovery ==
It was discovered in the fruit kernels of three species of South American plants in the genus Ximenia, after which it is named. and found to have the formula C_{18}H_{30}O_{2}.

== Natural occurrence ==
It can be extracted from the fruit kernels of the Santalum obtusifolium (Sandalwood) and the Australian sandalwood Santalum spicatum

It is also found in seed oil of other plants in the Santalaceae family, including the native cherry Exocarpos cupressiformis and sweet quandong Santalum acuminatum.

Species	% of kernel oil	Notes
S. spicatum	34	
S. obtusifolium	71.5	
S. acuminatum	?	

== Patents ==
It was the subject of a 2003 European patent (for use in food). The patent application was deemed withdrawn in August 2012.

== Uses ==
It is used in some skincare products.

== See also ==
- Ximenic acid
