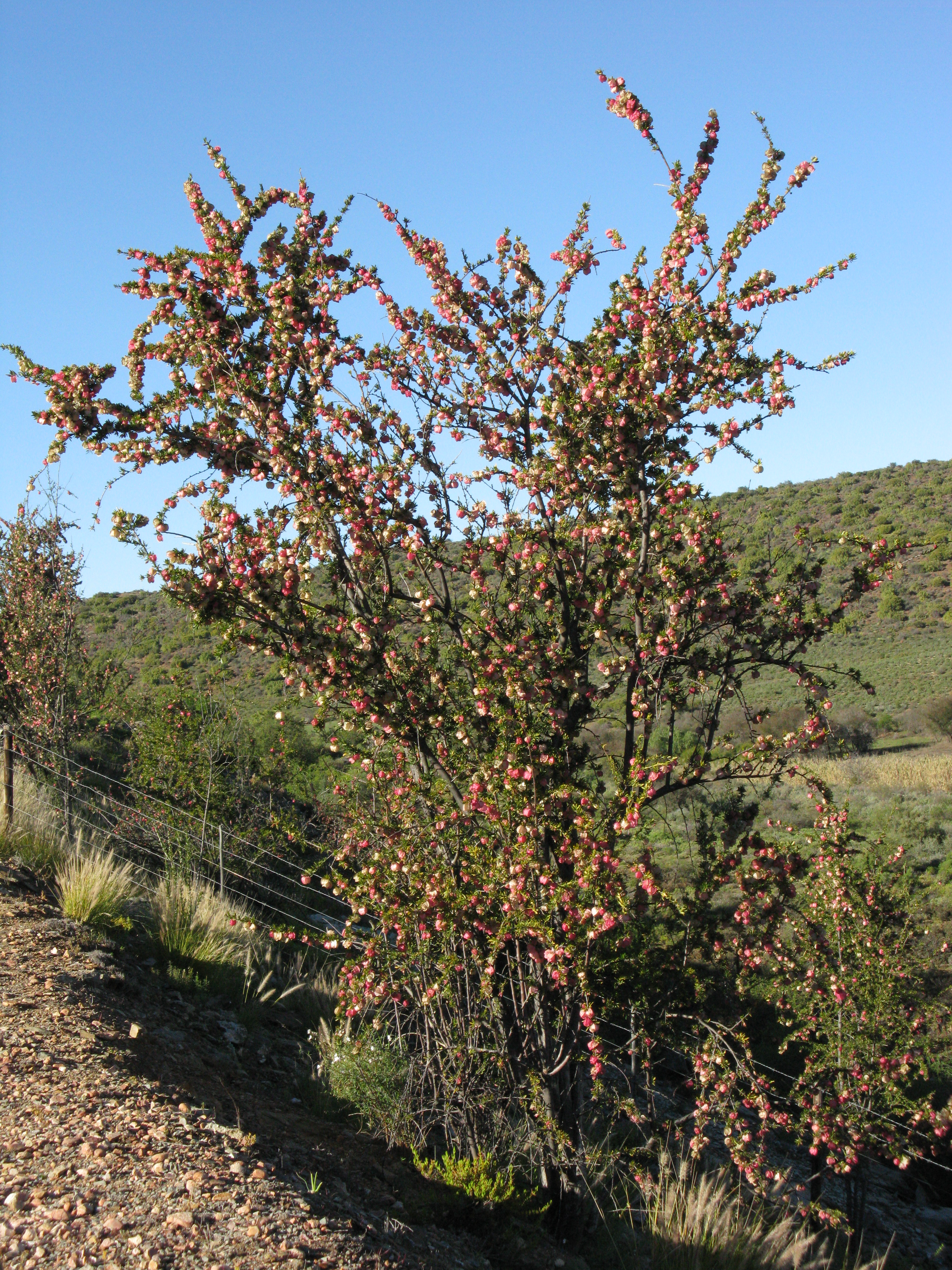
- Habit
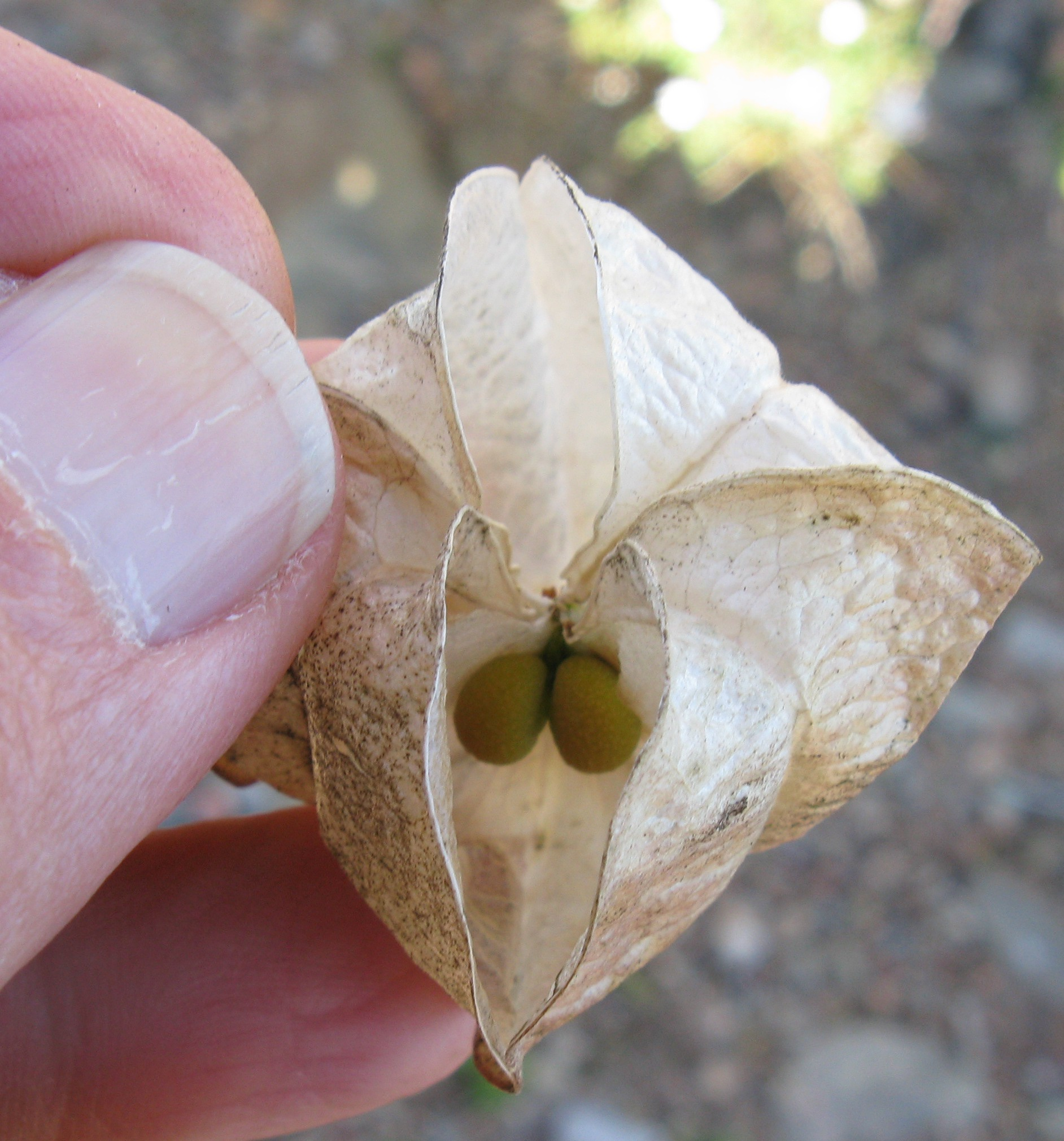
- Fruit capsule

Scientific classification
- Kingdom: Plantae
- Clade: Tracheophytes
- Clade: Angiosperms
- Clade: Eudicots
- Clade: Rosids
- Order: Sapindales
- Family: Meliaceae
- Subfamily: Melioideae
- Genus: Nymania; Lindb.
- Species: N. capensis

Binomial name
- Nymania capensis (Thunb.) Lindb.

= Nymania =

Chinese lantern

Genus of flowering plants

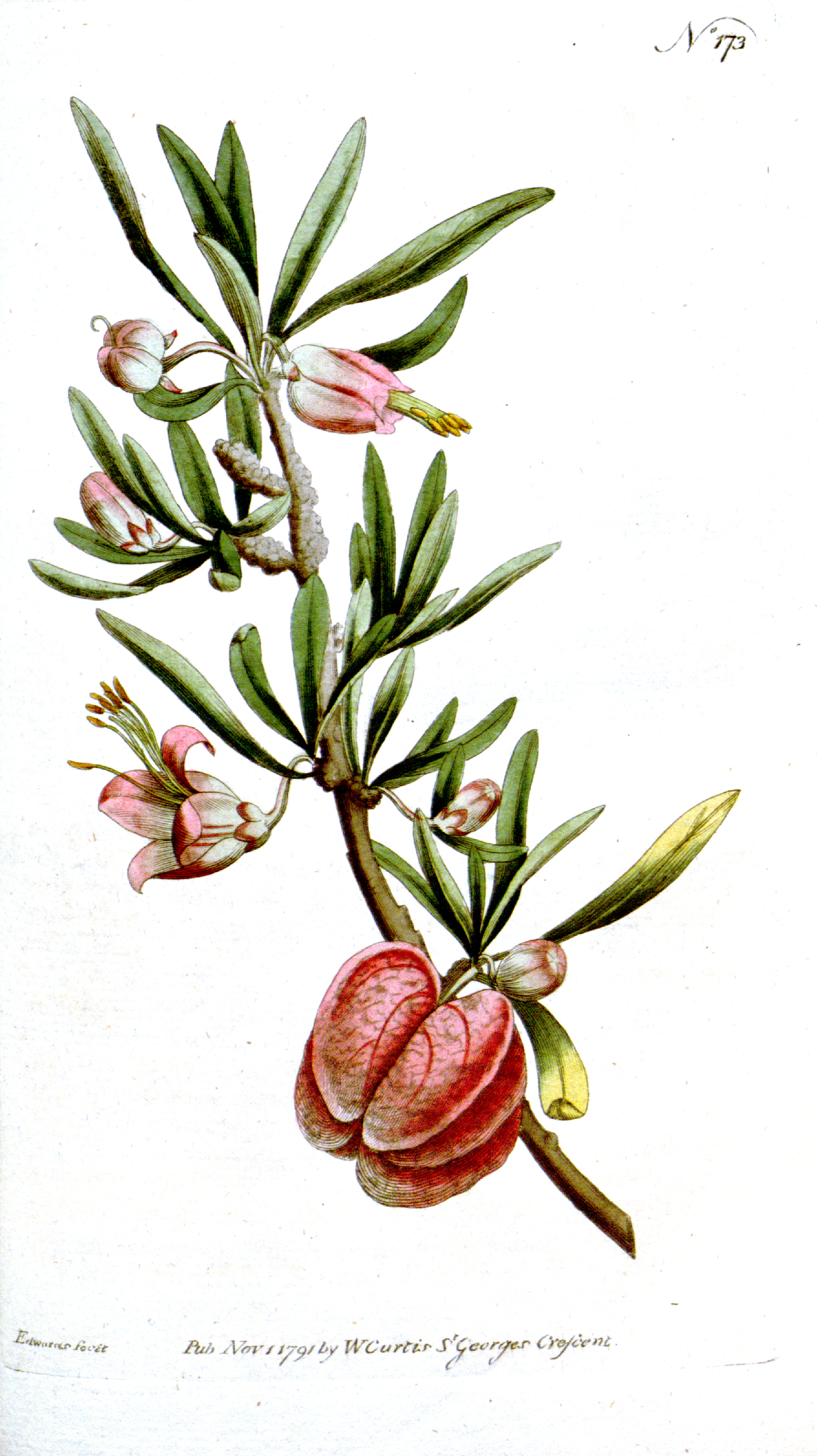
Nymania capensis sprig, showing flowers, fascicled leaves and an unripe fruit capsule, still red

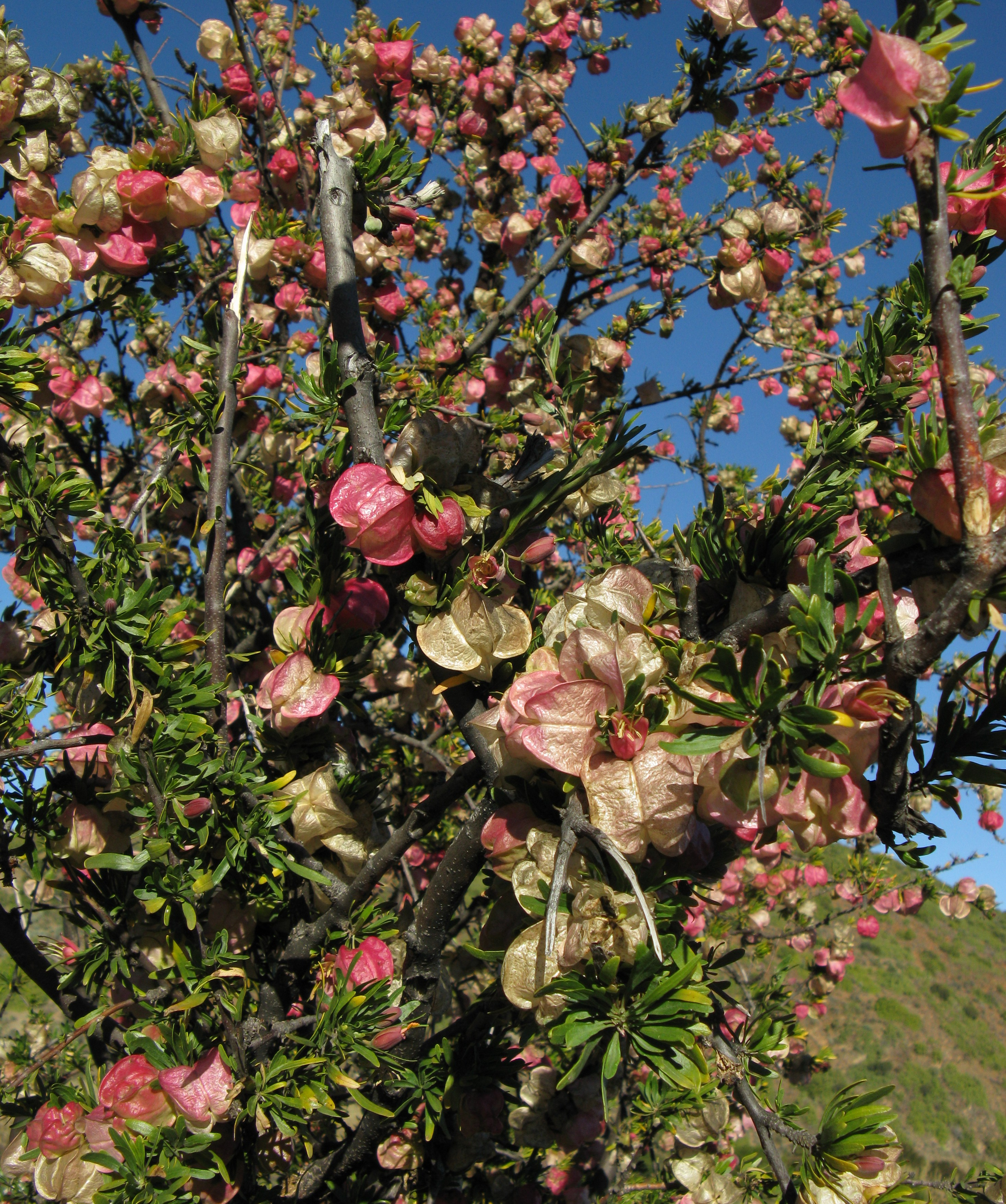
Nymania capensis in fruit

Nymania capensis is a species of plant known in English as "Chinese lantern" because of the shape of its bright, colourful fruit, and in Afrikaans as "klapper" (meaning "firecracker" because children sometimes pop the capsules for fun). It is the only species in the genus Nymania. It is a spare, scrubby, woody shrub or small tree, typically ) 0.5–3 m tall. It is endemic to South Africa and some closely bordering territories, especially inland regions in central, northern and eastern parts. It grows mainly in Karooid regions, among the scrub of gorges, but also in open veld and river banks in the Great and Little Karoo, Namaqualand and Kalahari. The leaves are alternate and fascicled. They are simple and more or less linear. The flowers are solitary, born on pedicels in axils. The corolla and calyx have four lobes each, with eight stamens inserted at the base of the disc, the filaments being connate at their base. The ovary is superior and sessile; it has four lobes and four locules, each containing two collateral ascending ovules. The stigma is simple and the style extends further than the stamens. The fruit is an inflated membranous capsule, 3–5 cm across, each locule forming a distinct lobe. The ripe seeds are hard and rounded, some 2–4 mm in diameter. A locule may contain less than two seeds, due to abortion.

The capsules are too heavy to be windborne, but when ripe they sometimes are blown over the veld, bearing their seeds in the manner of miniature tumbleweeds.

Carl Peter Thunberg originally described the species as Aitonia capensis in honour of William Aiton, but Sextus Otto Lindberg later renamed it to Nymania in honour of Carl Fredrik Nyman. Nymania capensis is the only species in the genus Nymania Lindb. Another species, "Nymania insignis K.Schum." (in the junior homonym genus Nymania K.Schum.; Euphorbiaceae) is a synonym of Phyllanthus clamboides. The genus has variously been assigned to the families Sapindaceae, Aitoniaceae, and Meliaceae. The correct assignment also is under review. Some characteristics, such as the pollen type, still are giving taxonomists pause.

Though the plant currently is valued as an ornamental, it is not easy for the amateur to germinate and it does not seem to have been of much material importance in other respects; it has been reported to have been used in folk medicine for the treatment of convulsions. Goats will browse it, but it is seldom plentiful enough to be important as a major source of forage.
