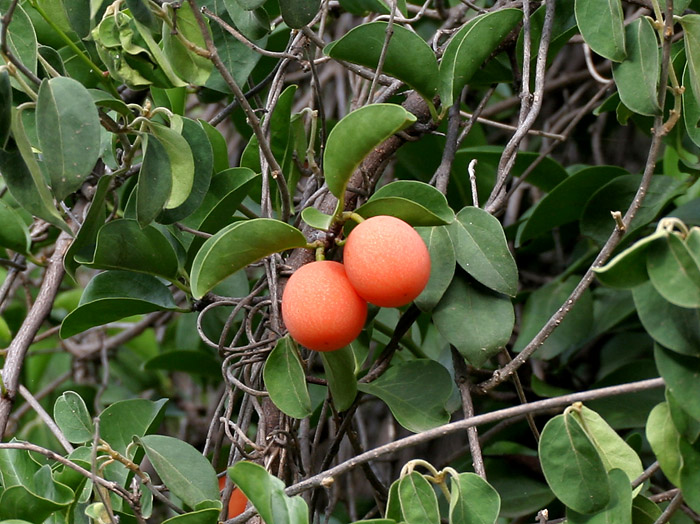
- Ximenia americana leaves & fruit at Chilkur near Hyderabad, India.

Scientific classification
- Kingdom: Plantae
- Clade: Tracheophytes
- Clade: Angiosperms
- Clade: Eudicots
- Order: Santalales
- Family: Olacaceae
- Genus: Ximenia; L.

Species
- See text

Synonyms
- Heymassoli Aubl. Pimecaria Raf. Rottboelia Scop. Ximeniopsis Alain

= Ximenia =

Genus of flowering plants

Ximenia is a genus of flowering plants in the family Olacaceae. The generic name honors Francisco Ximénez, a Spanish priest.

== Selected species ==
- Ximenia americana L.
- Ximenia afra (large sourplum) Sond.
- Ximenia coriacea Engl.
- Ximenia roigii León

=== Formerly placed here ===
- Balanites aegyptiaca (L.) Delile (as X. aegyptiaca L.)

== Image gallery ==
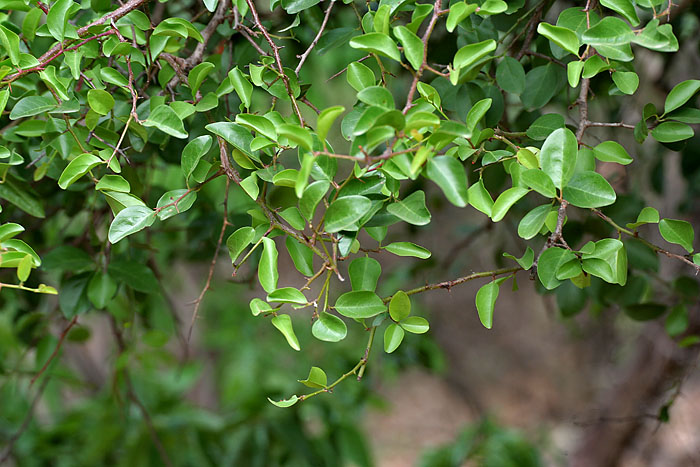
Ximenia americana leaves at Chilkur near Hyderabad, India.

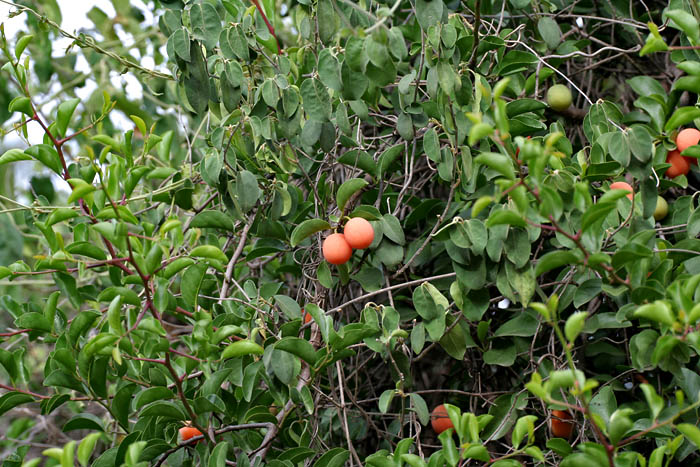
Ximenia americana leaves & fruit at Chilkur near Hyderabad, India.
