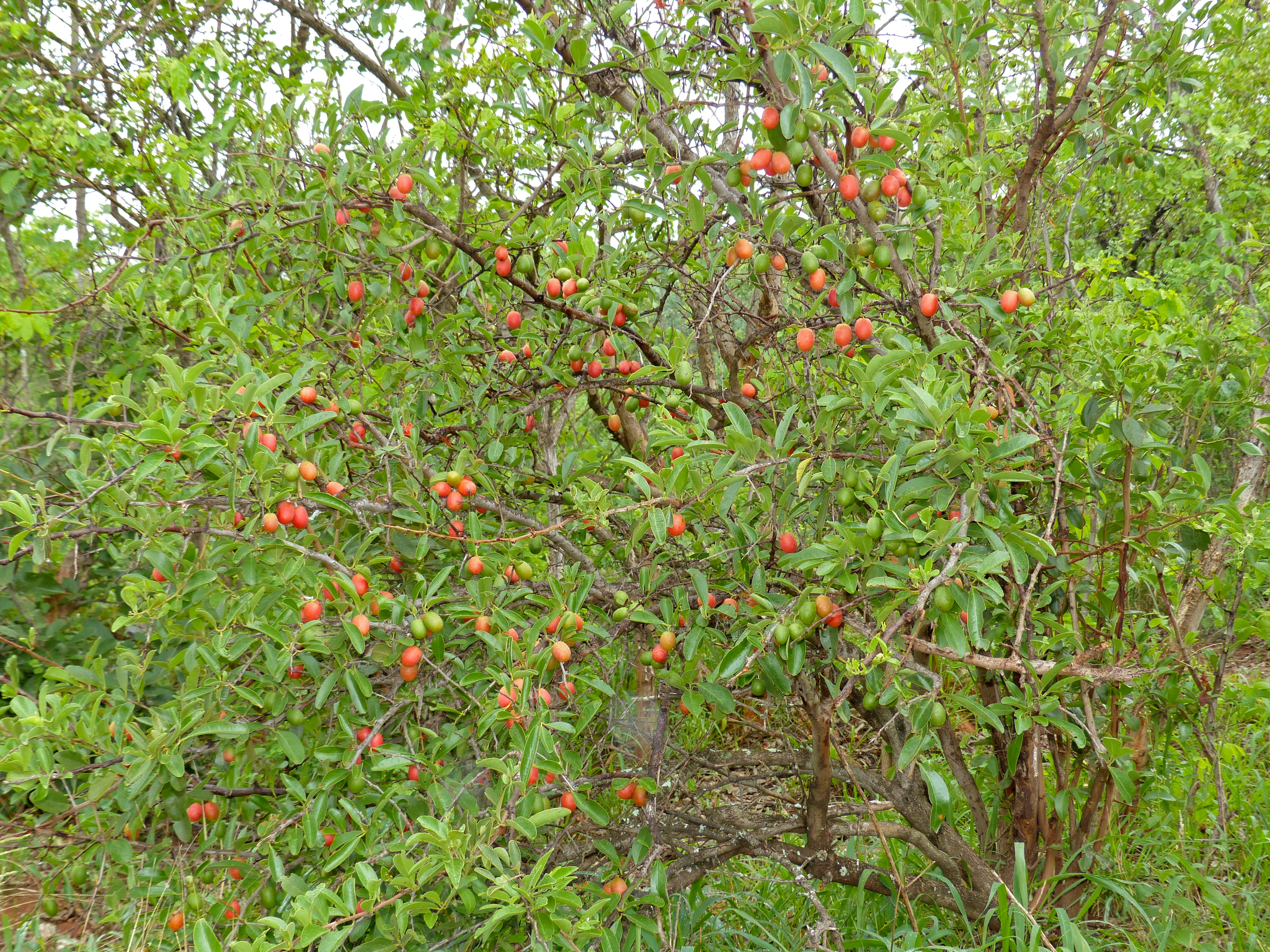

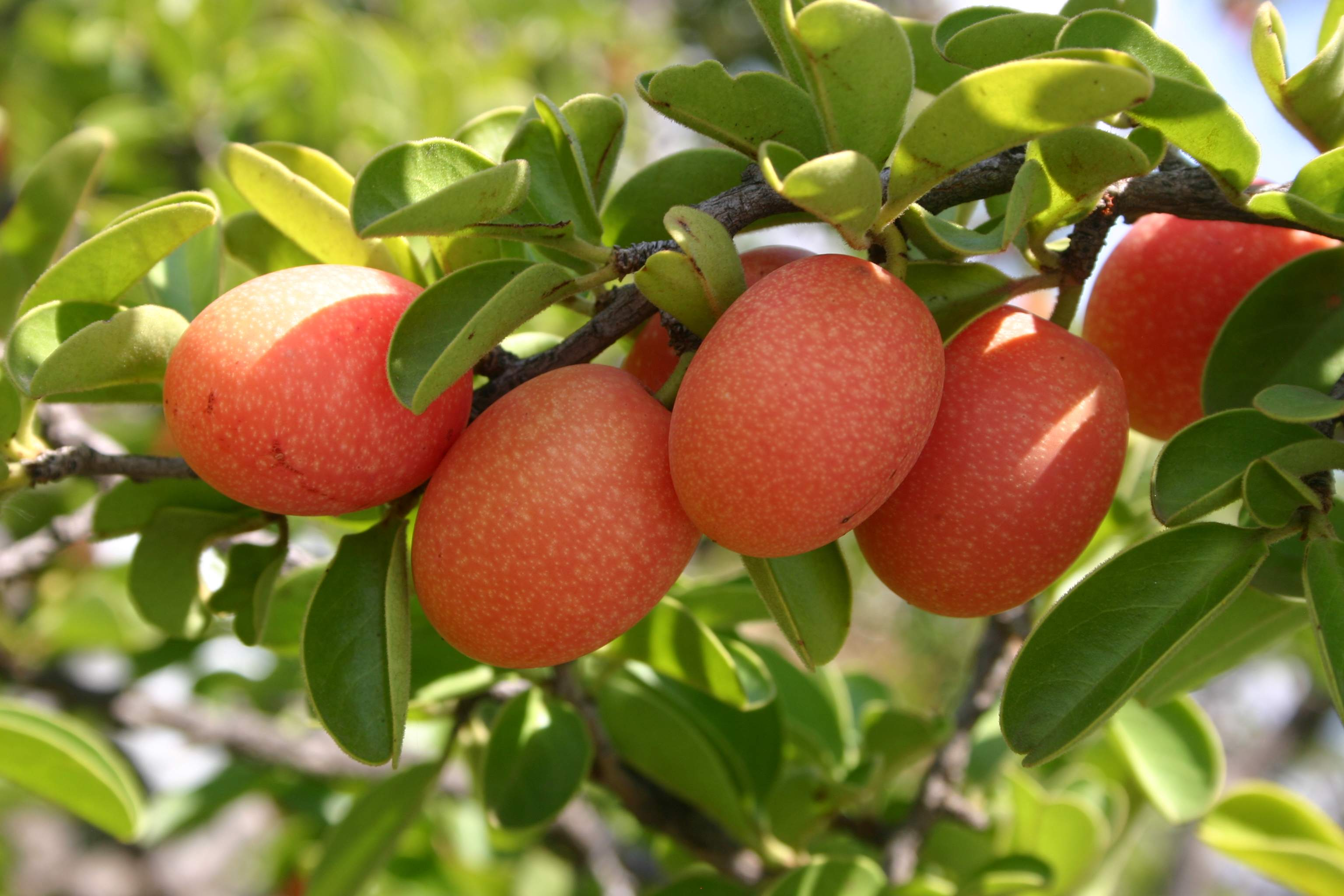
- Habit and fruit in South Africa

Conservation status
- Least Concern (IUCN 3.1)

Scientific classification
- Kingdom: Plantae
- Clade: Tracheophytes
- Clade: Angiosperms
- Clade: Eudicots
- Order: Santalales
- Family: Olacaceae
- Genus: Ximenia
- Species: X. afra

Binomial name
- Ximenia afra Sond.

Varieties
- Ximenia afra var. afra; Ximenia afra var. natalensis Sond.

Synonyms
- Ximenia americana var. afra (Sond.) Engl.

= Ximenia afra =

Species of shrub

Ximenia afra, the sourplum, is a small tree or small shrub that is thinly branched. It is part of the Olacaceae family which is native throughout tropical regions. In particular, the sourplum is native to regions in South East Africa, mainly Botswana, Kenya, Malawi, Mozambique, South Africa, Tanzania, Uganda, Zambia, and Zimbabwe. Sourplum fruits are generally sour, with a dry aftertaste, and contain significant amounts of potassium. The tree is fairly hardy, with frost resistance and drought tolerance. The tree, fruit, seed, leaves, and roots are all used for human consumption, medicinally, or for fuel.

== Description ==
The sourplum tree is a sparsely branched shrub or small tree around 2 m in height with a shapeless untidy crown. It has been known to grow to about 6 m in height. The branches are either smooth or covered with flattened hairs and armed with spines at their bases. The bark of the tree is grayish-brown to black in colour, and is longitudinally fissured. The leaves are simple, alternate, and elliptic in shape. When the tree flowers, the flowers are greenish to creamy white in colour although they have been seen to be sometimes tinged pink or red.

The sourplum fruit itself is ellipsoidal in shape. The skin is smooth and starts green, and then ripens to an orange or red. Similarly the flesh is also orange or red in colour, and when ripe has a juicy pulp. The sourplum is 3.5 cm in length and 2.5 cm in diameter. The seed is smooth, ellipsoid, and yellow-brown to red in colour. The seed is hard and around 2.5 cm in length.

== History, geography and ethnography ==
A related species, the yellow plum (Ximenia americana), occurs in western United States. The sourplum can be located from Tanzania to KwaZulu-Natal. In the wild, it is found in woodlands, grasslands, rocky outcrops and sometimes termite mounds. All parts of the tree and its fruits are used in cultural remedies.

== Growing conditions ==
It will generally flower in September to October during the dry season to the onset of the rains. The fruits from this flowering are produced in December to January during the rains. This varies from region to region as in Tanzania, flowering occurs in January, May, July, and October, with the fruit being produced generally in October and January. The sourplum can tolerate altitudes of up to 2000 m, and requires annual rainfall of 250–1270 mm. It generally requires clay or loam soils for effective growth. Once planted the seeds will germinate after 14–30 days, and have a moderate growth rate of 0.5 m per year.

== Uses ==
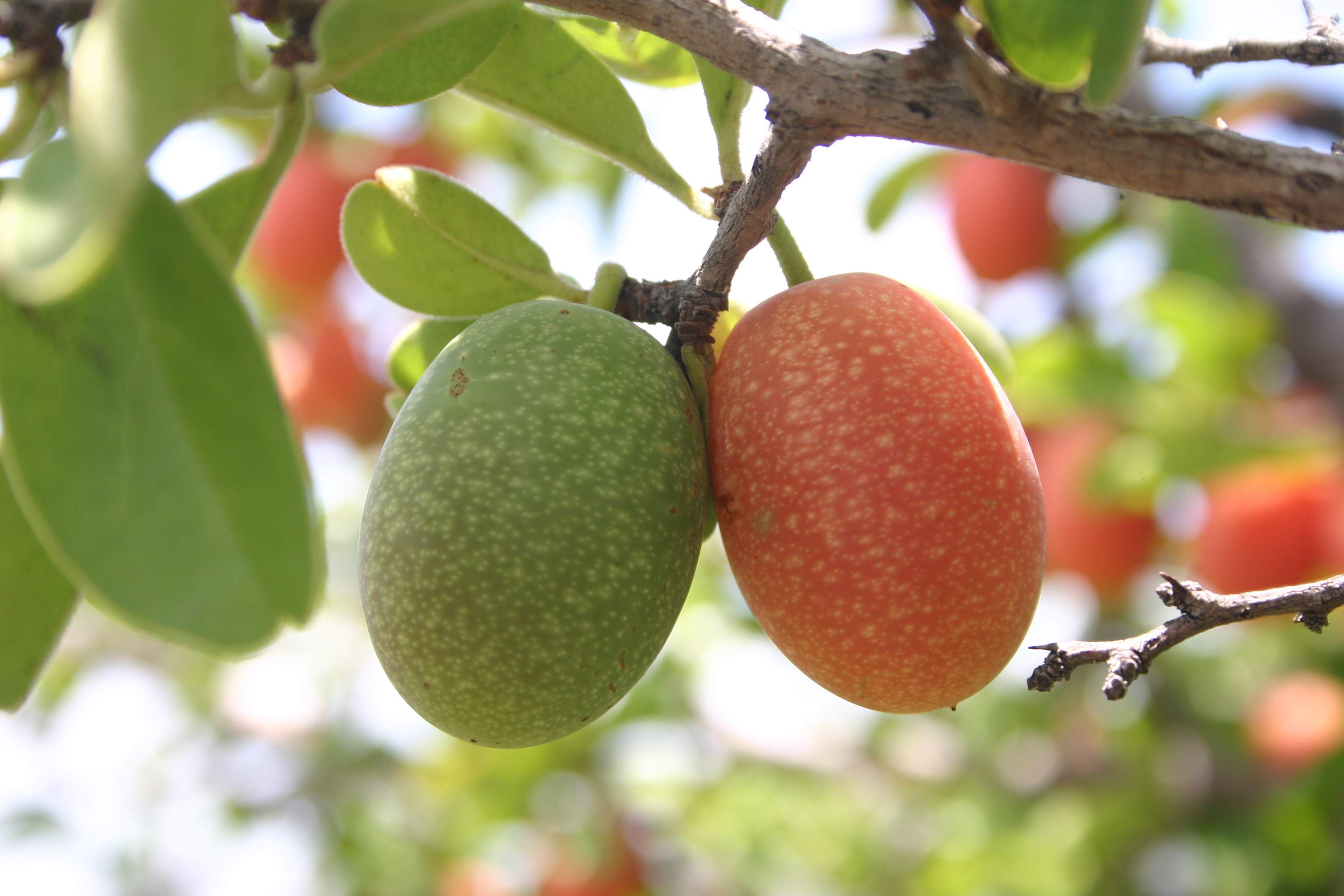
Ximenia afra, green and ripe fruit

=== Food ===
The fruit is sour but can be eaten raw; it is best eaten when slightly overripe. More typically, it is put into cold water to soak, and then the skin and seed are removed by pressing. The remaining pulp is then mixed with pounded tubers to create a porridge. Alternatively, the fruits can also be processed into a storable jam. The fruits are also known to be used for desserts and jellies.

=== Wood ===
The wood of the tree is hard and fine-grained. Typically, it is used as a firewood. However, it can also be used to make handles for tools, utensils, or for construction purposes.

=== Oil ===
To extract the oil, the seeds are roasted, then mashed, and the oil extracted. The oil serves several purposes, and can be used to soften leather, oiling bowstrings, or as a general ointment. Alternatively, the oil can be used cosmetically for the hair or for the skin to soothe chafing. The oil can also be used as fuel for lamps.

== Phytochemicals and its antioxidant and anti-inflammatory activities ==
The chemical profile of X. afra leaf was comprehensively analyzed and led to the identification of 10 polyphenol compounds, including phenolic acid and flavonoids. Further bioactivity investigations showed that extracts of X. afra leaves exhibit anti-oxidant, anti-proliferation, and anti-inflammatory activities. The underlying molecular mechanism may partially be contributed by the inhibition of NF-κB activation, a shared signal pathway between proliferation and inflammation.

=== Reported medicinal purposes ===
The roots are used to treat abscesses, stomach aches, colic, malaria, coughs, and bilharzias. They can also be pounded, turned into porridge and eaten to reportedly prevent sterility in women. It is thought that powdered roots can also be added to beer to act as an aphrodisiac. The tree's bark is used as a remedy for syphilis, hookworm, chest pains, and body pain. The seeds are generally roasted and then pounded for their oils to be used for wounds as an ointment. The leaves can be used to soothe inflamed eyes and as a reported cure for tonsillitis. Most of these claims do not appear to have been scientifically validated, and further research is required.

=== Animal uses ===
The fruits are eaten by birds and various other animals. Several butterfly species are known to feed on the leaves. Various mammals are known to graze on the leaves of the tree, with particular emphasis in times of drought.

== Nutritional information ==
The ripe fruit has a vitamin C content of 27%, a protein content of 18%, and is high in potassium. The seed has a 65% oil content.

Energy Value (kj/100 g)	Phosphorus (μg/g)	Calcium (μg/g)	Magnesium (μg/g)	Iron (μg/g)	Potassium (μg/g)
1506	1674	29	459	366	41791

=== Amino acid profile ===
Amino Acid	Mean ± SD (g/100 g)
Alanine	1.17 ± 0.04
Arginine	1.85 ± 0.16
Aspartic acid	1.21 ± 0.11
Glutamic acid	2.34 ± 0.18
Glycine	0.58 ± 0.05
Histidine	0.47 ± 0.07
Hydroxyproline	0.24 ± 0.01
Isoleucine	0.62 ± 0.02
Leucine	1.03 ± 0.05
Lysine	1.03 ± 0.09
Methionine	0.16 ± 0.02
Phenylalanine	0.55 ± 0.04
Proline	0.79 ± 0.00
Serine	0.64 ± 0.04
Threonine	0.73 ± 0.08
Tyrosine	0.75 ± 0.13
Valine	0.71 ± 0.04
Total	14.87

== Constraints to wider adoption ==
The seedlings may perish to extended periods of drought, as they are not as drought tolerant. The local fauna has a tendency to graze upon the leaves of the tree, and during the dry season animals will actively select this tree to graze upon.

== Practical information ==
The ripe fruit has a high amount of tannins, leading to an astringent dry aftertaste. The fruit's astringent qualities will intensify during storage. The seeds have no special requirements for storage. The tree can be used as a natural fence to designate tracts of land or set a perimeter. The plant is moderately frost tolerant and drought resistant. The fruits are known to be sold in small markets.
