= Acanthus (ornament) =

Ornamental motif

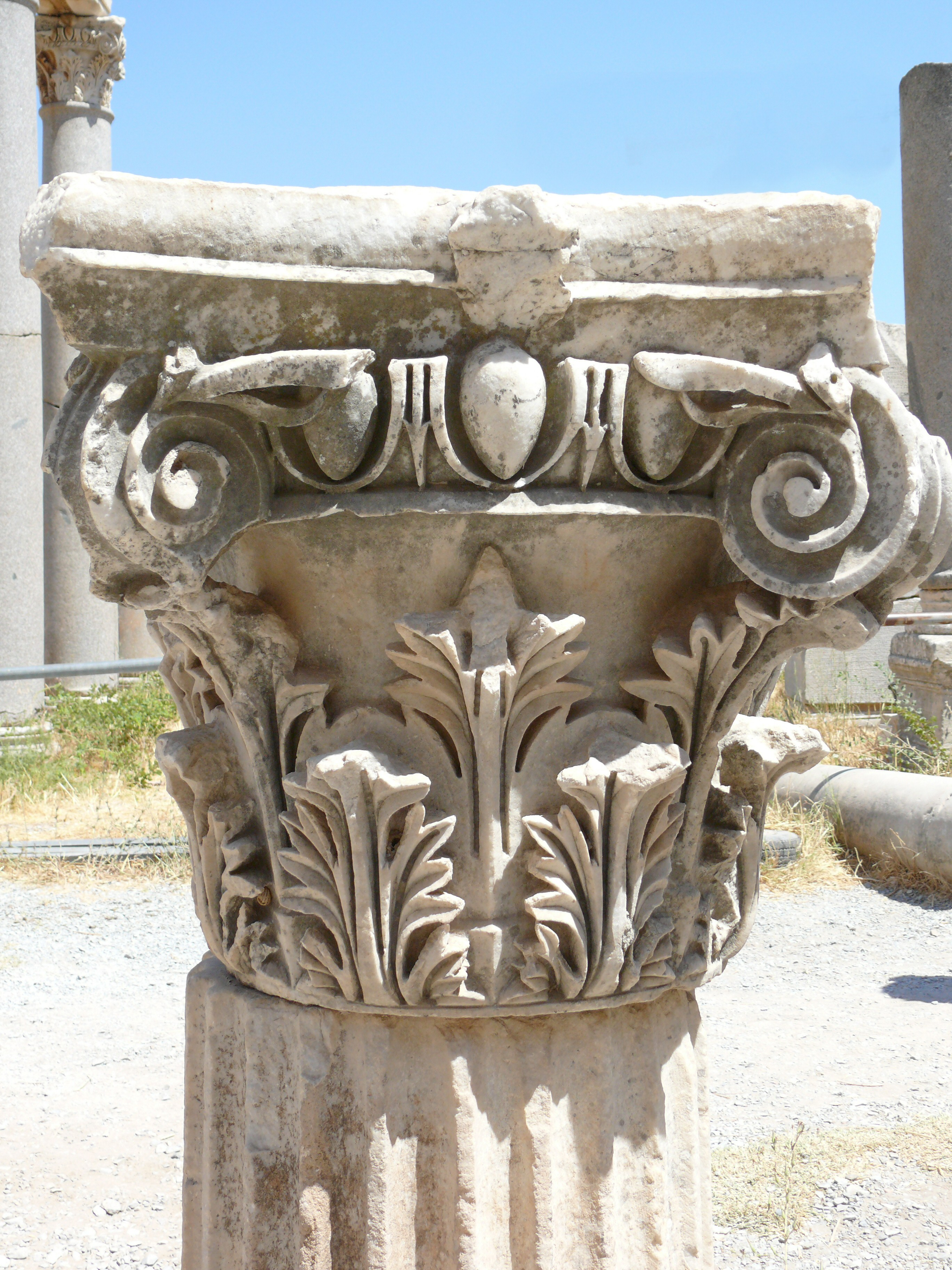
Composite capital with acanthus leaves

The acanthus (Ancient Greek: ἄκανθος) is one of the most common plant forms used to make foliage ornament and decoration in the architectural tradition emanating from Greece and Rome.

== Architecture ==
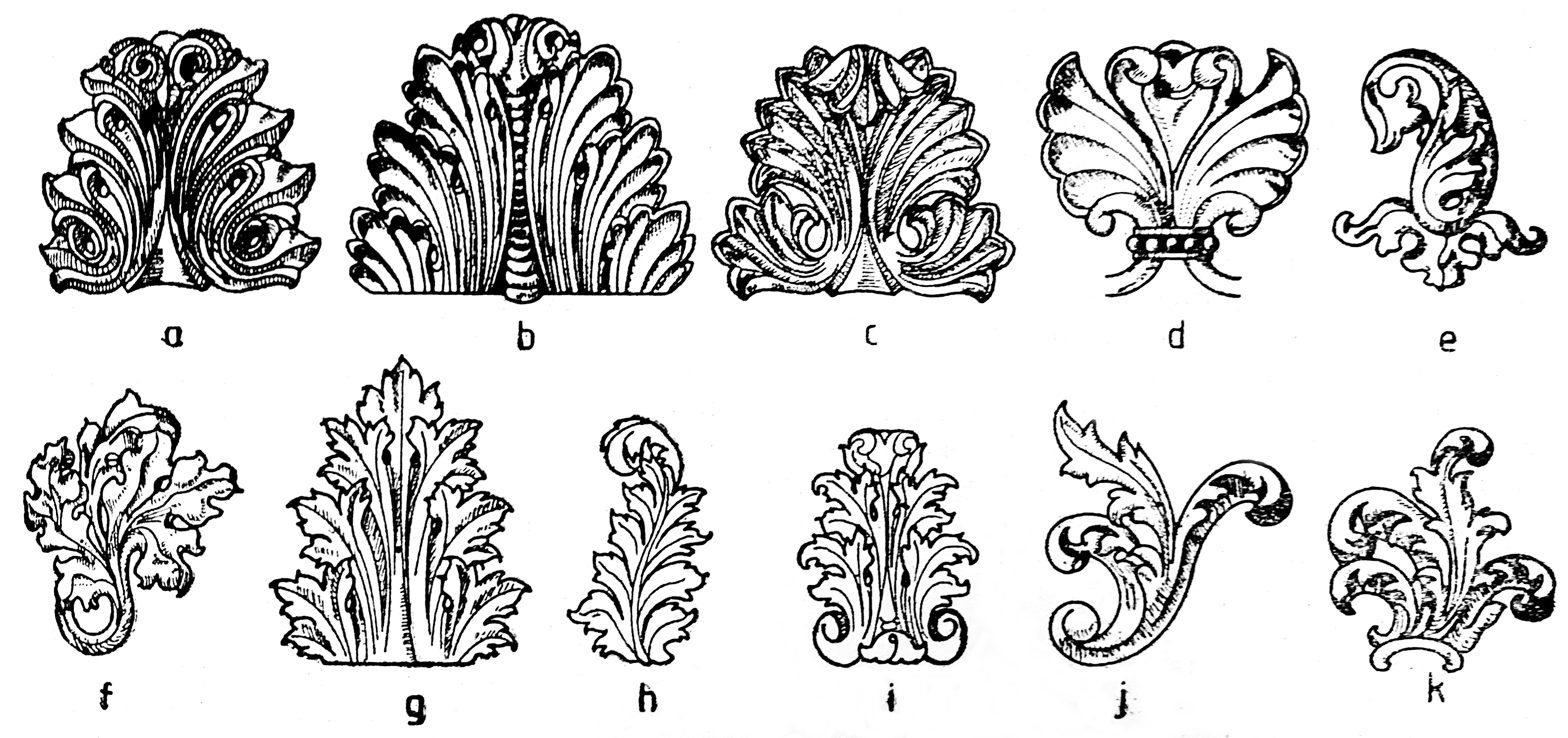
Timeline of acanthus styles: a) Greek; b) Roman; c) Byzantine; d) Romanesque; e & f) Gothic; g) Renaissance; h & i) Baroque; j & k) Rococo

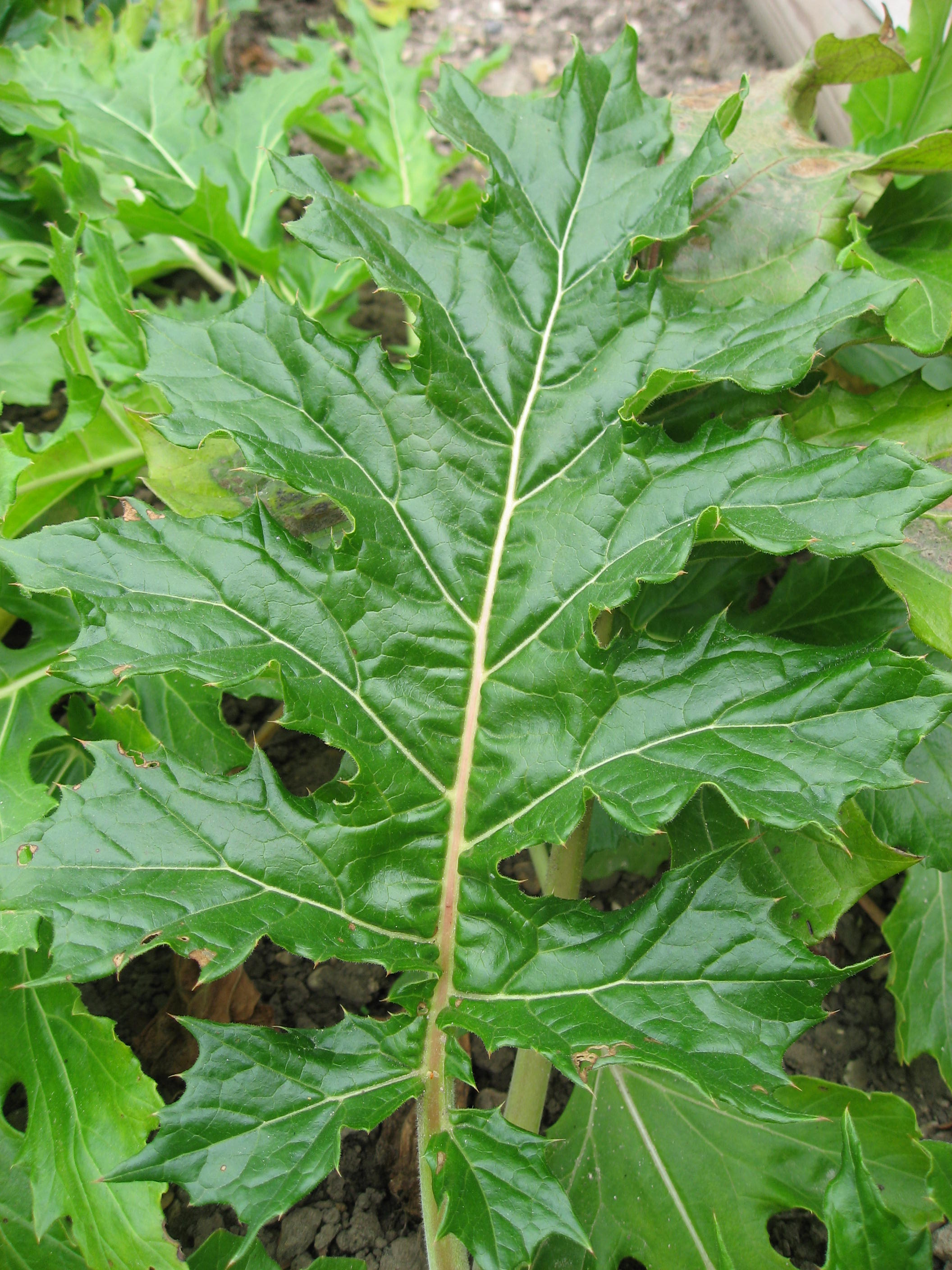
Acanthus mollis leaf; in both this and A. spinosus the leaf forms are rather variable

In architecture, an ornament may be carved into stone or wood to resemble leaves from the Mediterranean species of the Acanthus genus of plants, which have deeply cut leaves with some similarity to those of the thistle and poppy. Both Acanthus mollis and the still more deeply cut Acanthus spinosus have been claimed as the main model, and particular examples of the motif may be closer in form to one or the other species; the leaves of both are, in any case, rather variable in form. The motif is found in decoration in nearly every medium.

The relationship between acanthus ornament and the acanthus plant has been the subject of a long-standing controversy. Alois Riegl argued in his Stilfragen that acanthus ornament originated as a sculptural version of the palmette, and only later began to resemble Acanthus spinosus.

=== Greek and Roman ===
In ancient Roman and ancient Greek architecture acanthus ornament appears extensively in the capitals of the Corinthian and Composite orders, and applied to friezes, dentils and other decorated areas. The oldest known example of a Corinthian column is in the Temple of Apollo Epicurius at Bassae in Arcadia, c. 450–420 BC, but the order was used sparingly in Greece before the Roman period. The Romans elaborated the order with the ends of the leaves curled, and it was their favourite order for grand buildings, with their own invention of the Composite, which was first seen in the epoch of Augustus. Acanthus decoration continued in popularity in Byzantine, Romanesque, and Gothic architecture. It saw a major revival in the Renaissance, and still is used today.

The Roman writer Vitruvius (c. 75 – c. 15 BC) related that the Corinthian order had been invented by Callimachus, a Greek architect and sculptor who was inspired by the sight of a votive basket that had been left on the grave of a young girl. A few of her toys were in it, and a square tile had been placed over the basket, to protect them from the weather. An acanthus plant had grown through the woven basket, mixing its spiny, deeply cut leaves with the weave of the basket.

=== Byzantine ===
Some of the most detailed and elaborate acanthus decoration occurs in important buildings of the Byzantine architectural tradition, where the leaves are undercut, drilled, and spread over a wide surface. Use of the motif continued in Medieval art, particularly in sculpture and wood carving and in friezes, although usually it is stylized and generalized, so that one doubts that the artists connected it with any plant in particular. After centuries without decorated capitals, they were revived enthusiastically in Romanesque architecture, often using foliage designs, including acanthus. Curling acanthus-type leaves occur frequently in the borders and ornamented initial letters of illuminated manuscripts, and are commonly found in combination with palmettes in woven silk textiles. In the Renaissance classical models were followed closely, and the acanthus becomes recognisable again in large-scale architectural examples. The term is often also found describing more stylized and abstracted foliage motifs, where the similarity to the species is weak.

== Gallery ==
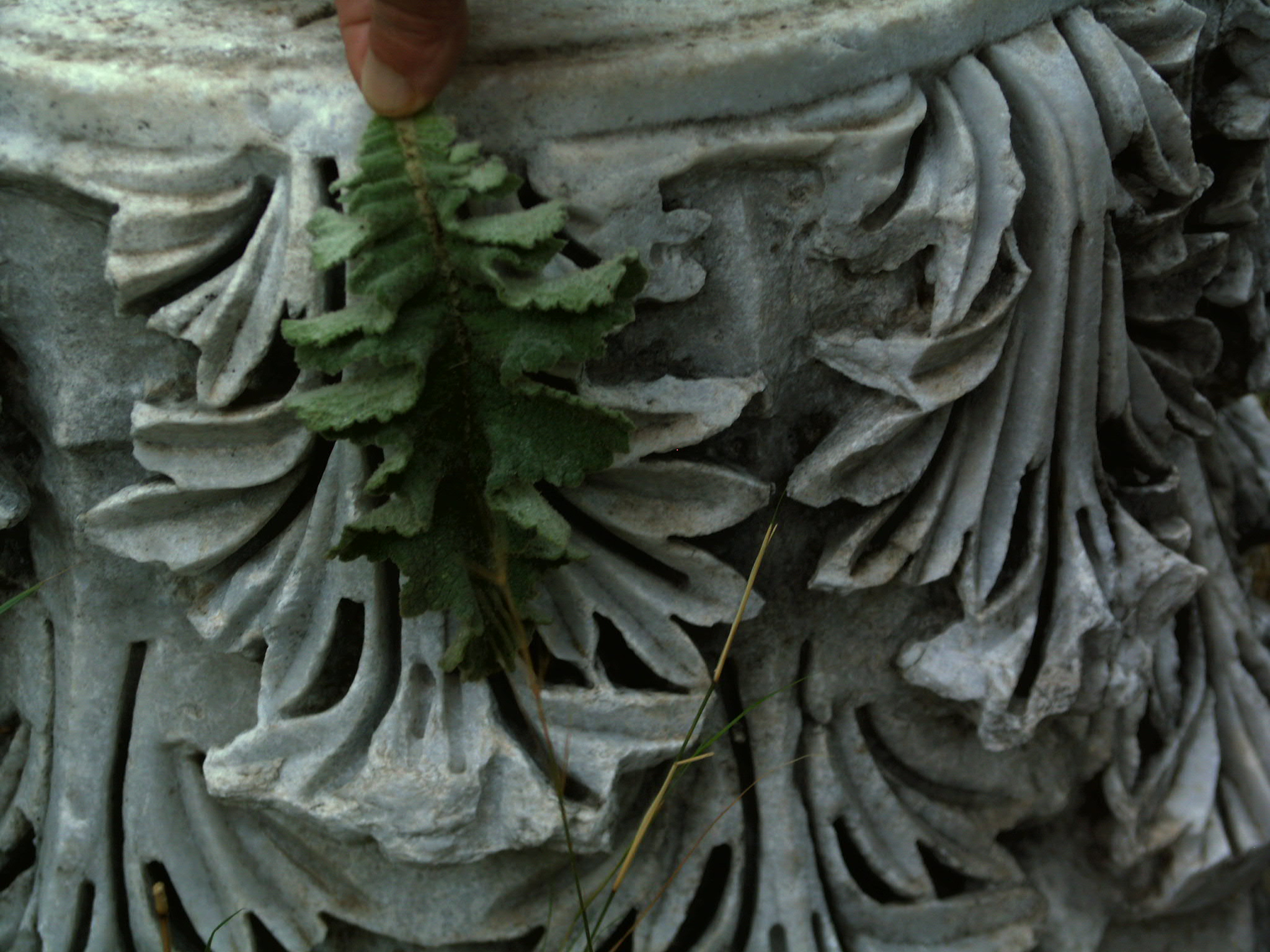
Acanthuses, one natural and the rest manmade, on a Corinthian capital

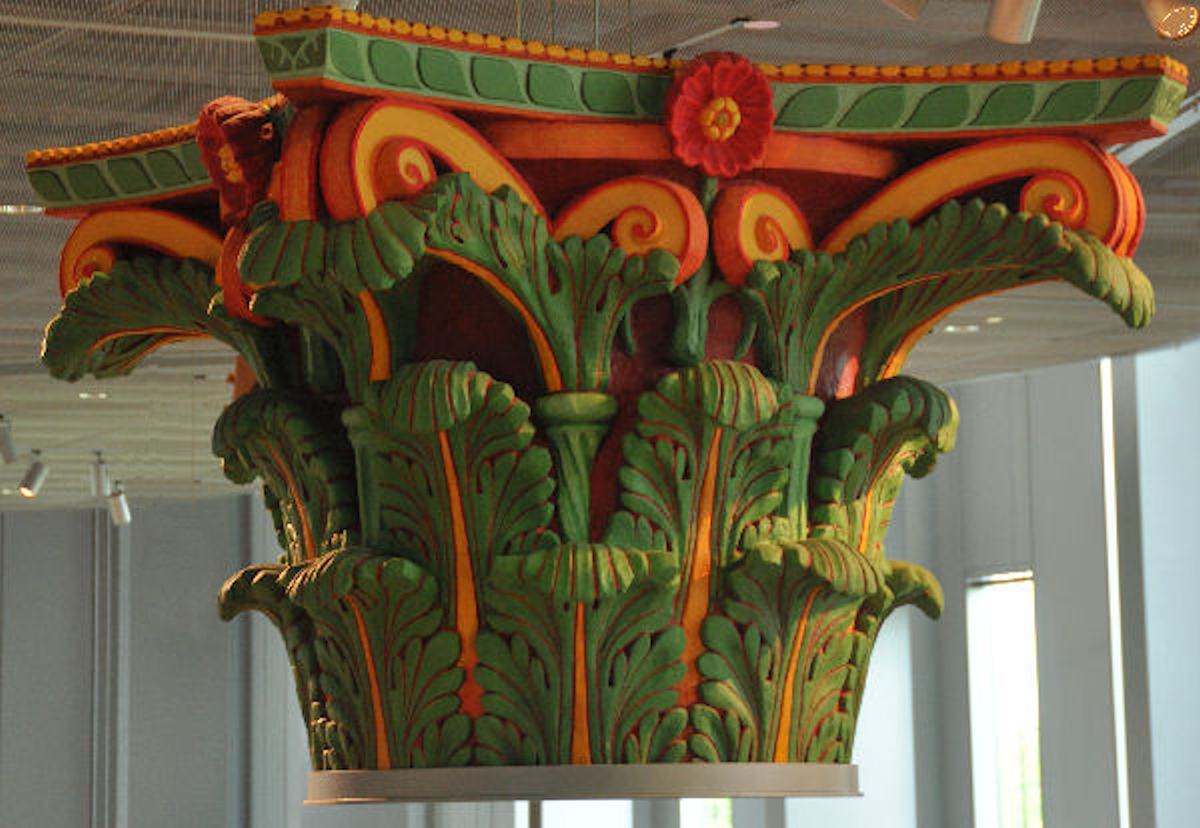
Reconstructed Corinthian capital from Xanten, Germany, with original colours

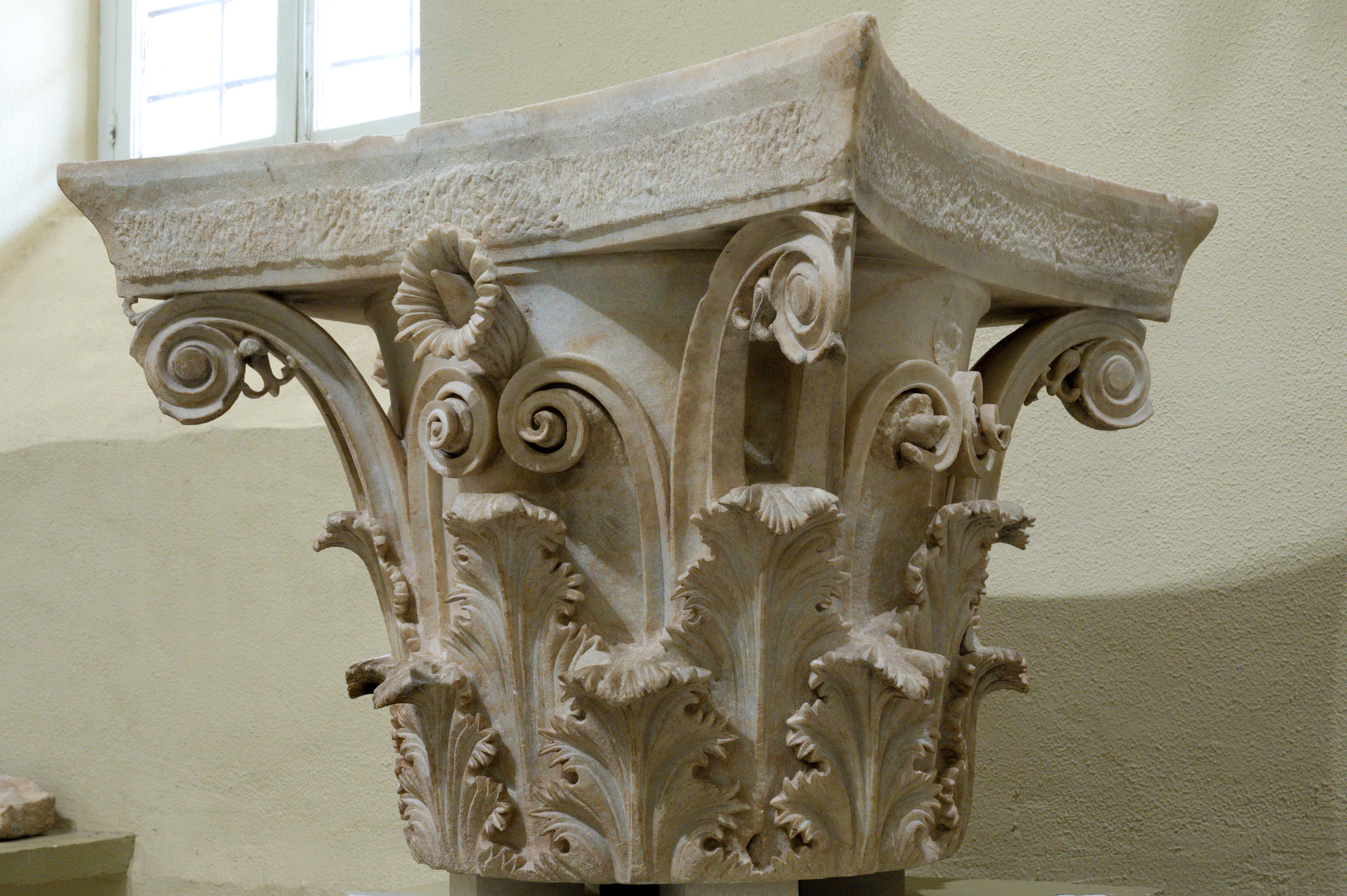
Ancient Greek Corinthian capital from the tholos at Epidaurus, Archaeological Museum of Epidaurus, Greece, said to have been designed by Polyclitus the Younger, c.350 BC

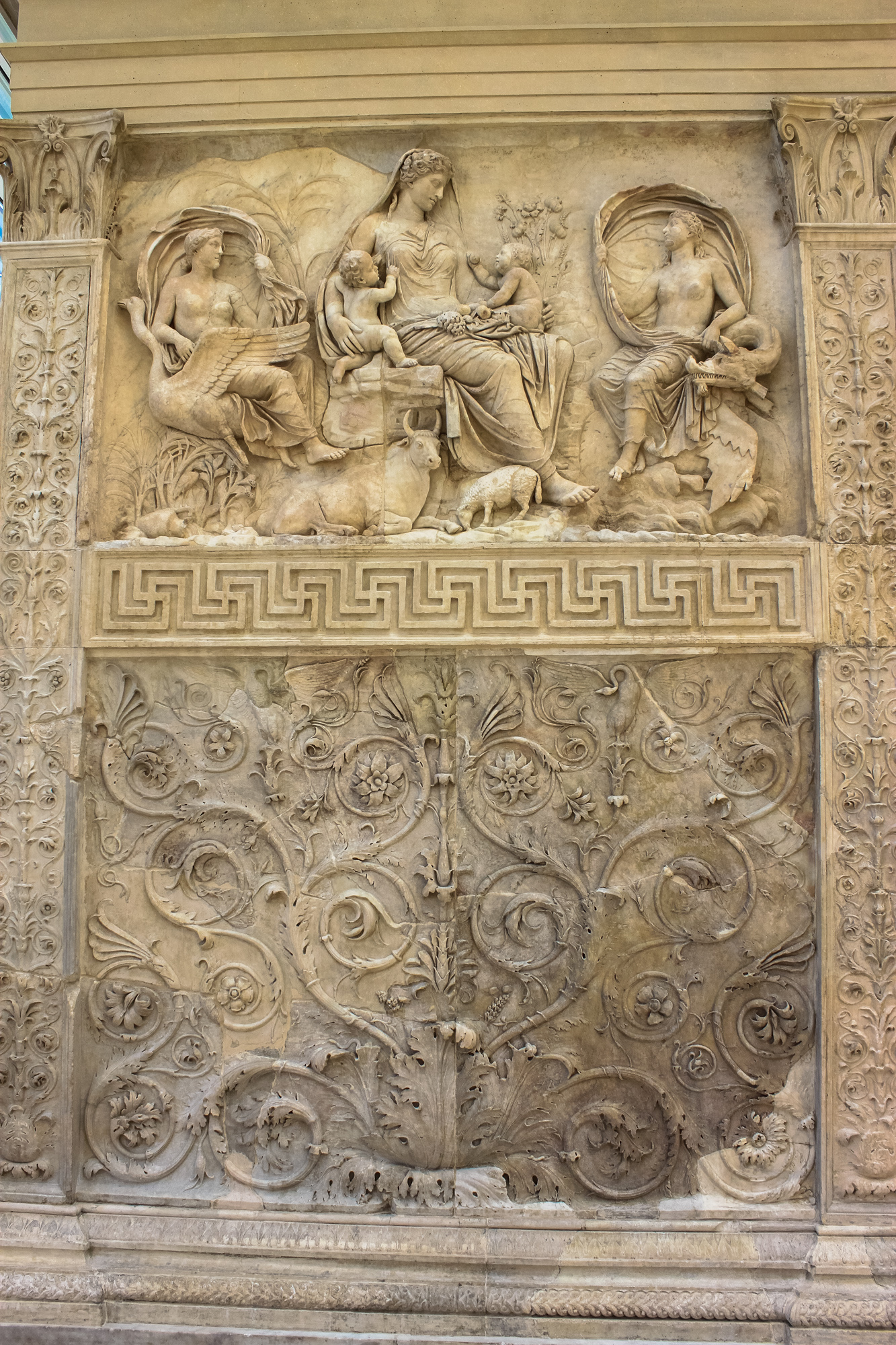
Roman acanthuses in an arabesque on the Ara Pacis, Rome, unknown architect and sculptors, 13-9 BC

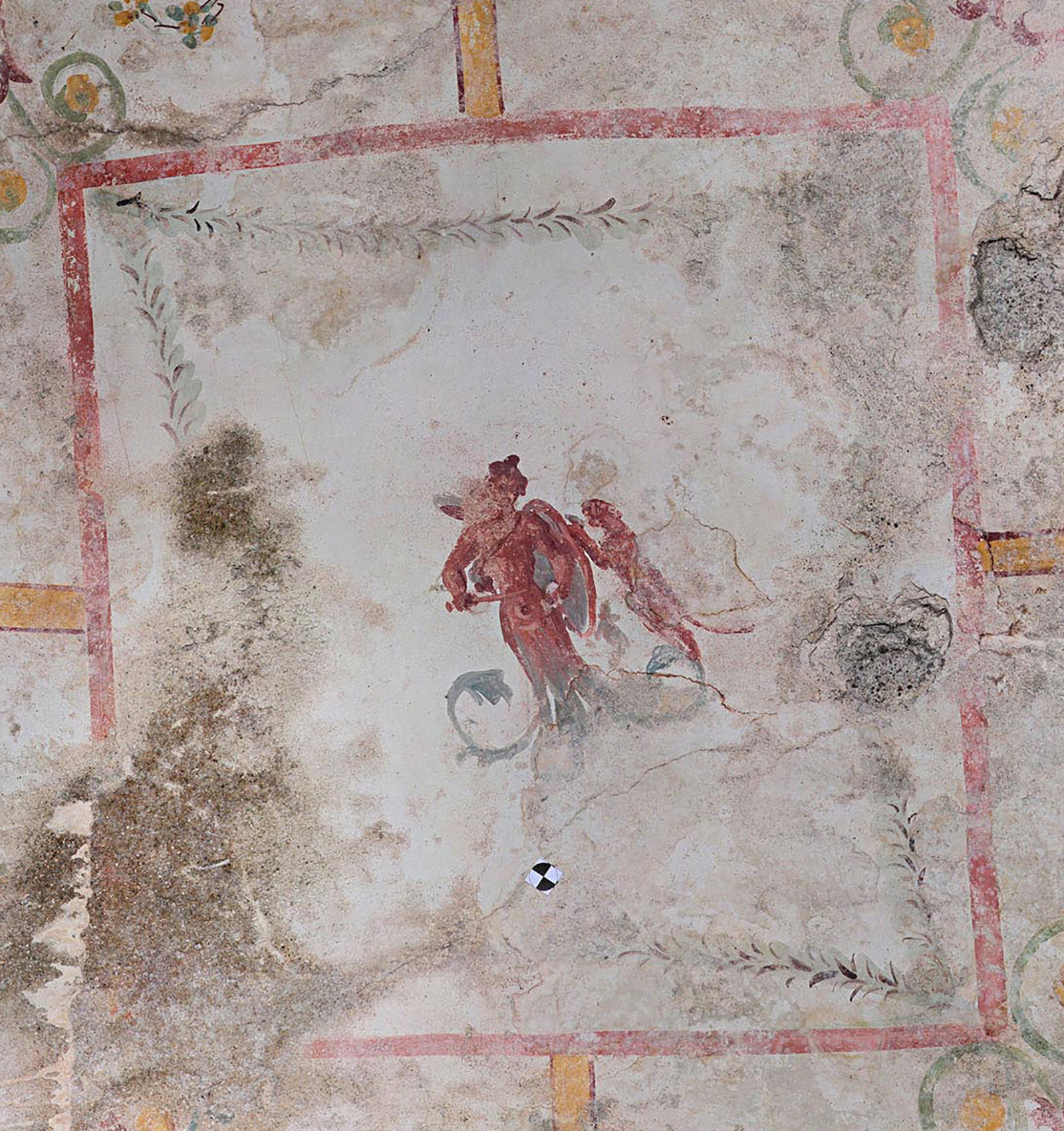
Roman acanthuses that replace the legs of a figure of a man that is attacked by a panther, Sala della Sfinge, Domus Aurea, Rome, unknown painter, 65-68 AD

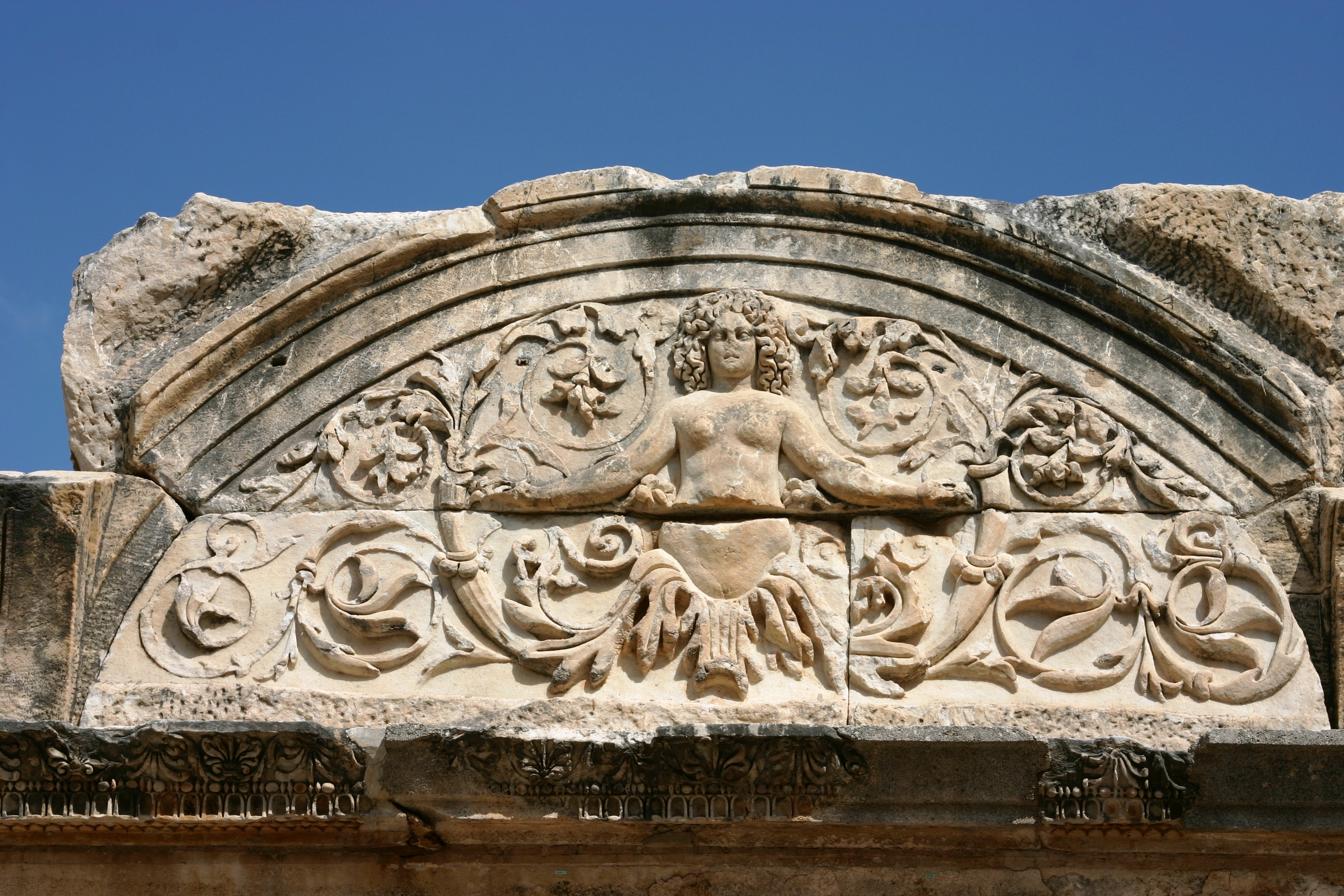
Roman acanthuses of the Temple of Hadrianus, Ephesus, Turkey, unknown architect or sculptor, 117-118

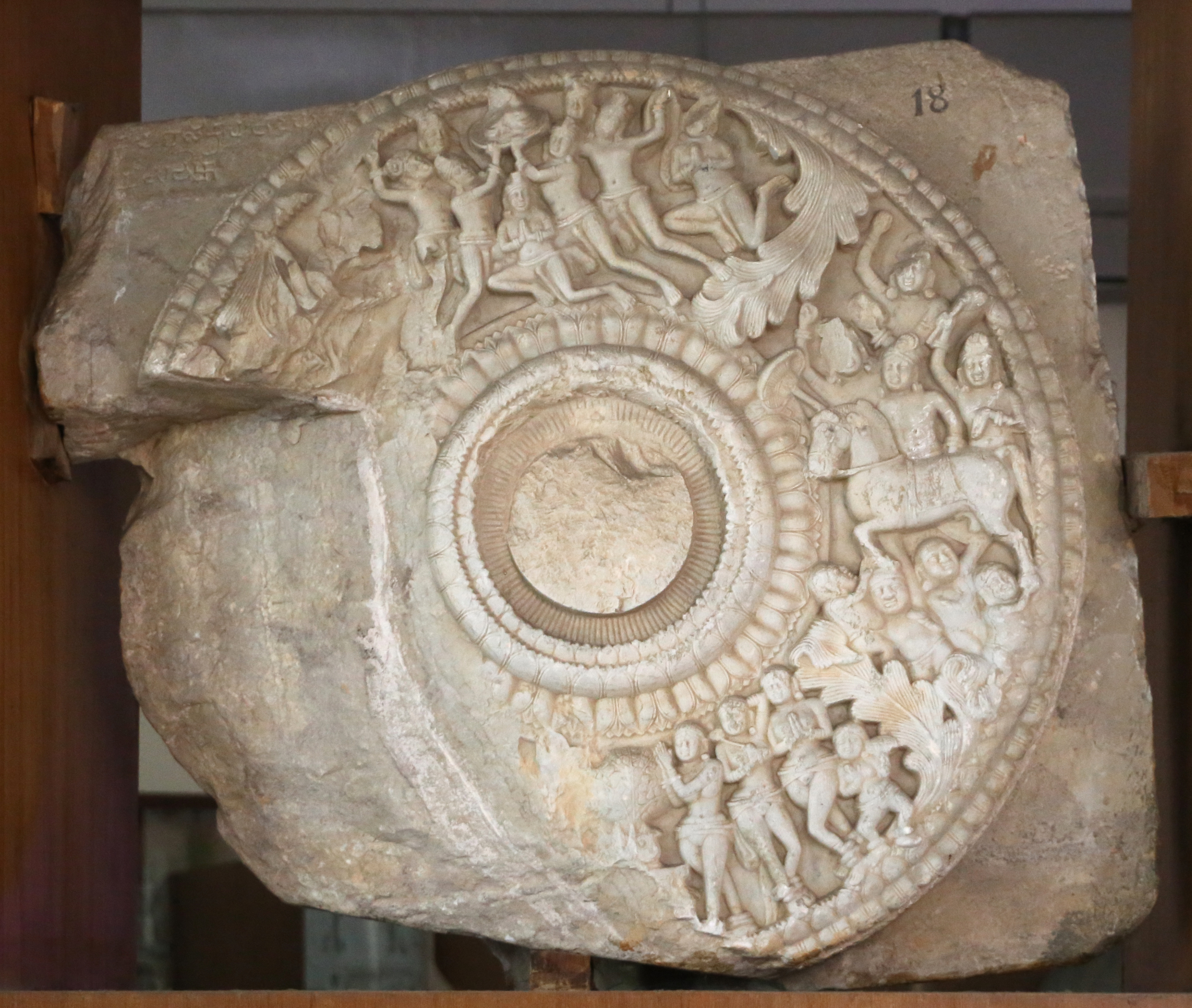
Indian acanthuses on a medallion from the Amaravati Stupa, India, c. 150 AD, stone, Government Museum, Chennai, India

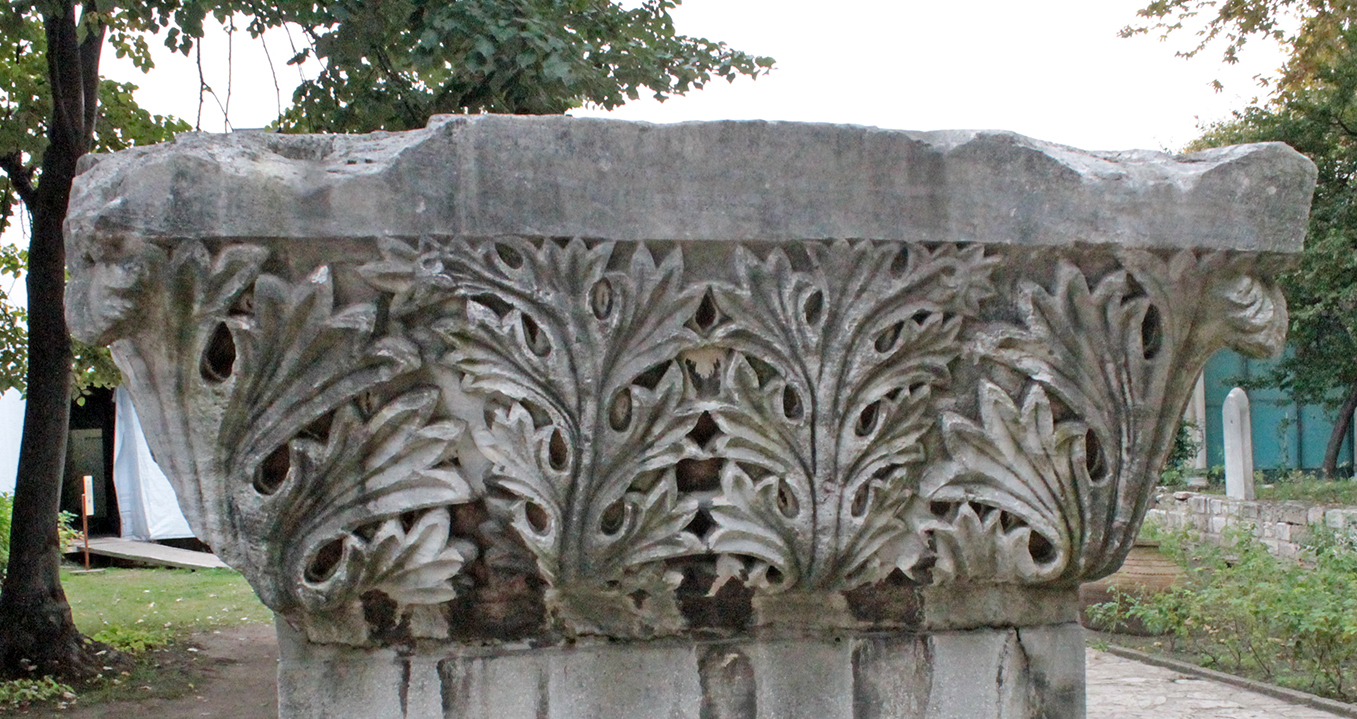
Byzantine quasi-Corinthian capital of the Column of Leo, formerly in the Forum of Leo, Constantinople, now in a courtyard of the Topkapı Palace, Fatih, Istanbul, Turkey, unknown architect or sculptor, 457-474

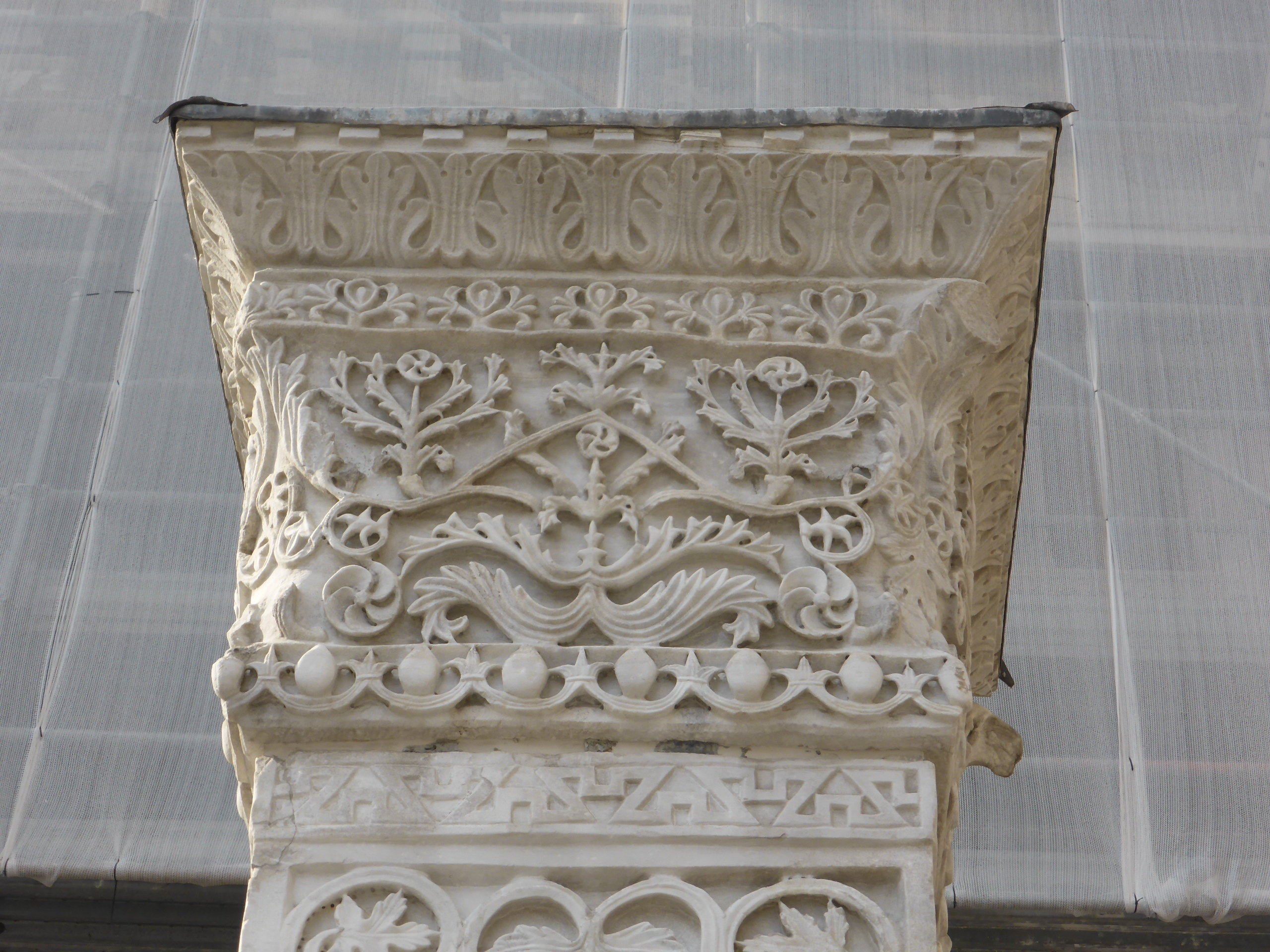
Byzantine acanthuses on the cornice at the top of the Pilastri Acritani (Pillars of Acre), originally in the Church of St. Polyeuctus, later taken and now displayed in the Piazzetta di San Marco, Venice, unknown architect or sculptor, 524-527

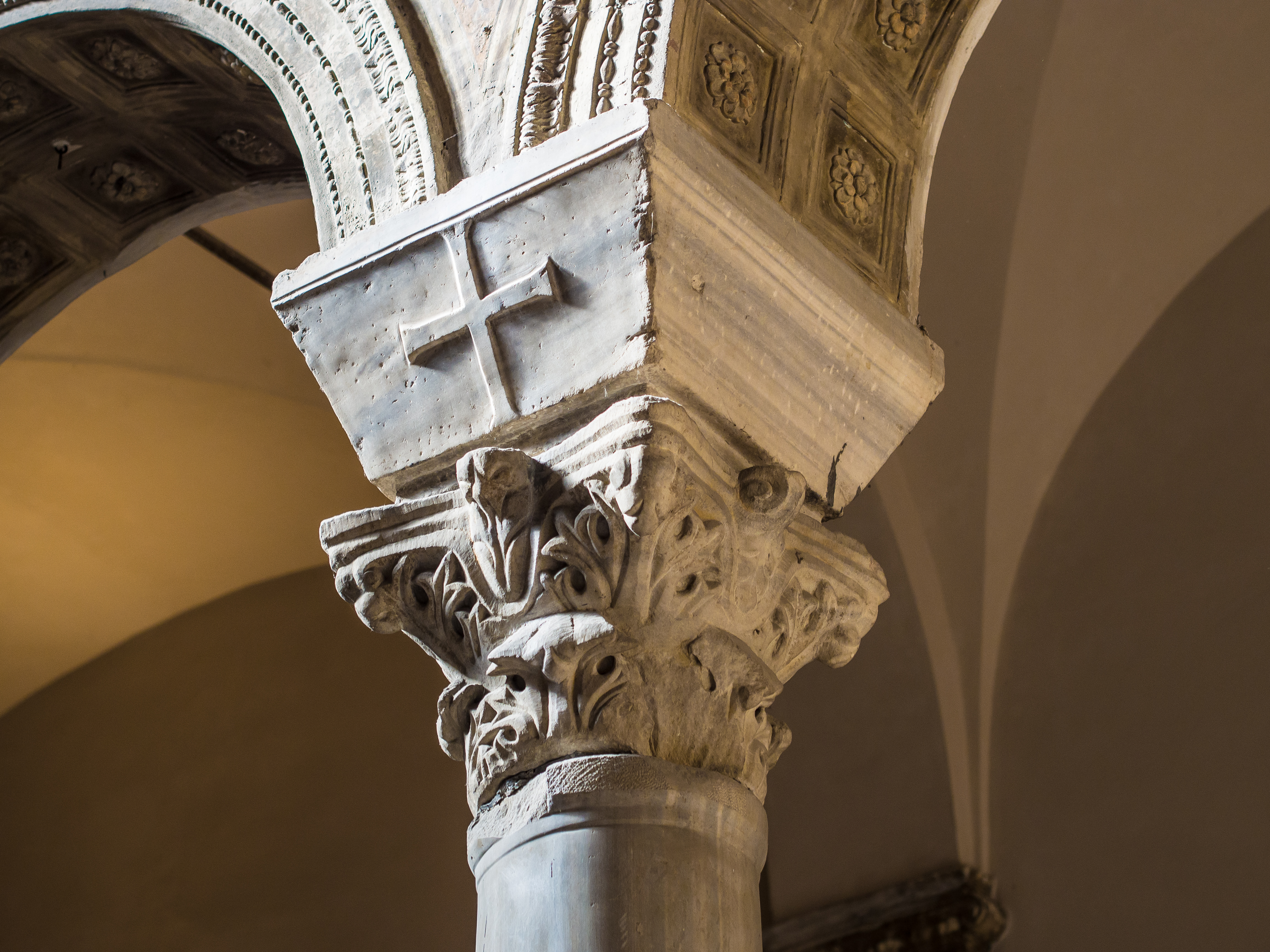
Byzantine quasi-Corinthian capital in the Basilica of Sant'Apollinare Nuovo, Ravenna, Italy, unknown architect or sculptor, 6th century

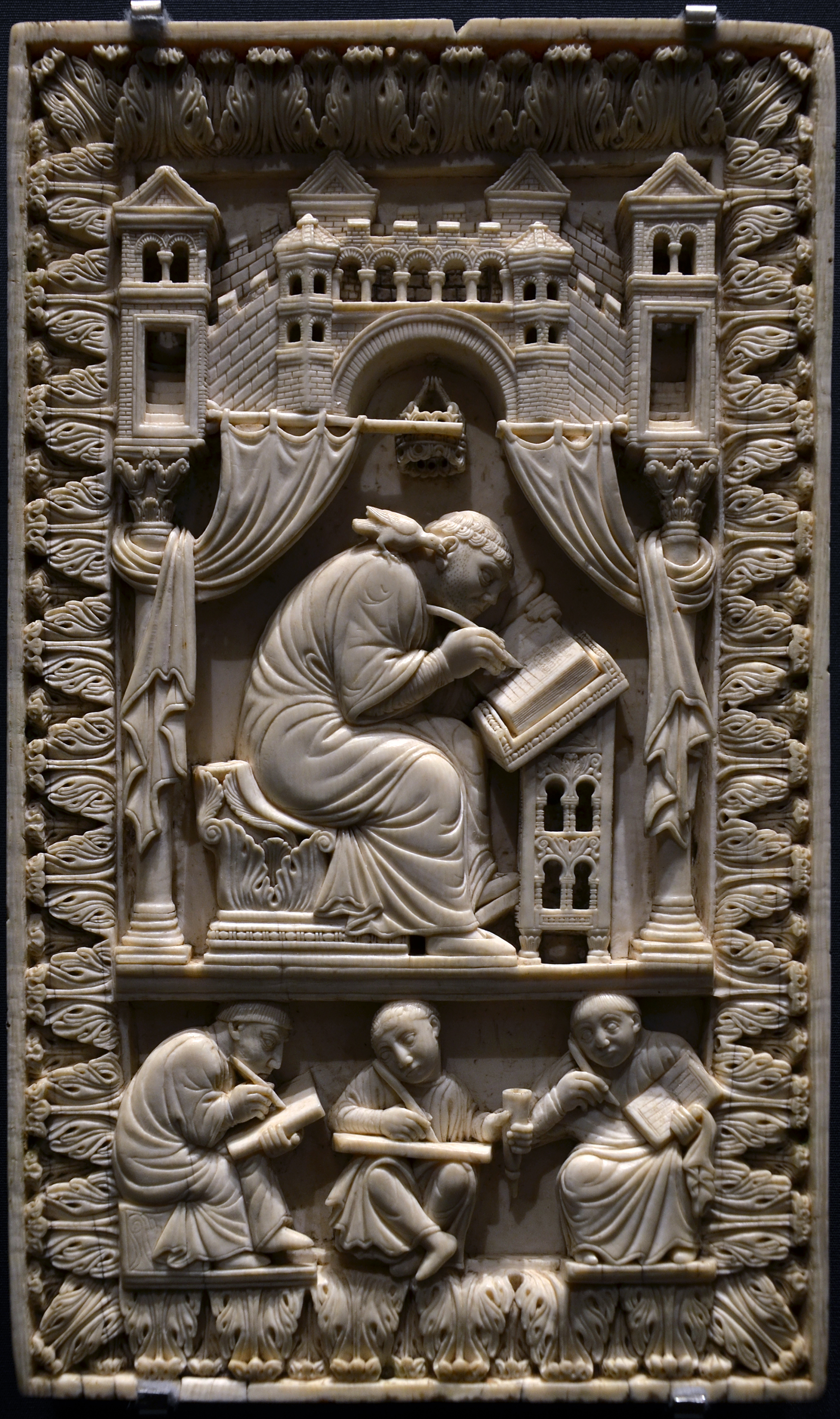
Byzantine-inspired border of acanthuses on a Carolingian era relief of St Gregory with the scribes, unknown artist, c.865, ivory, Kunsthistorisches Museum, Vienna, Austria

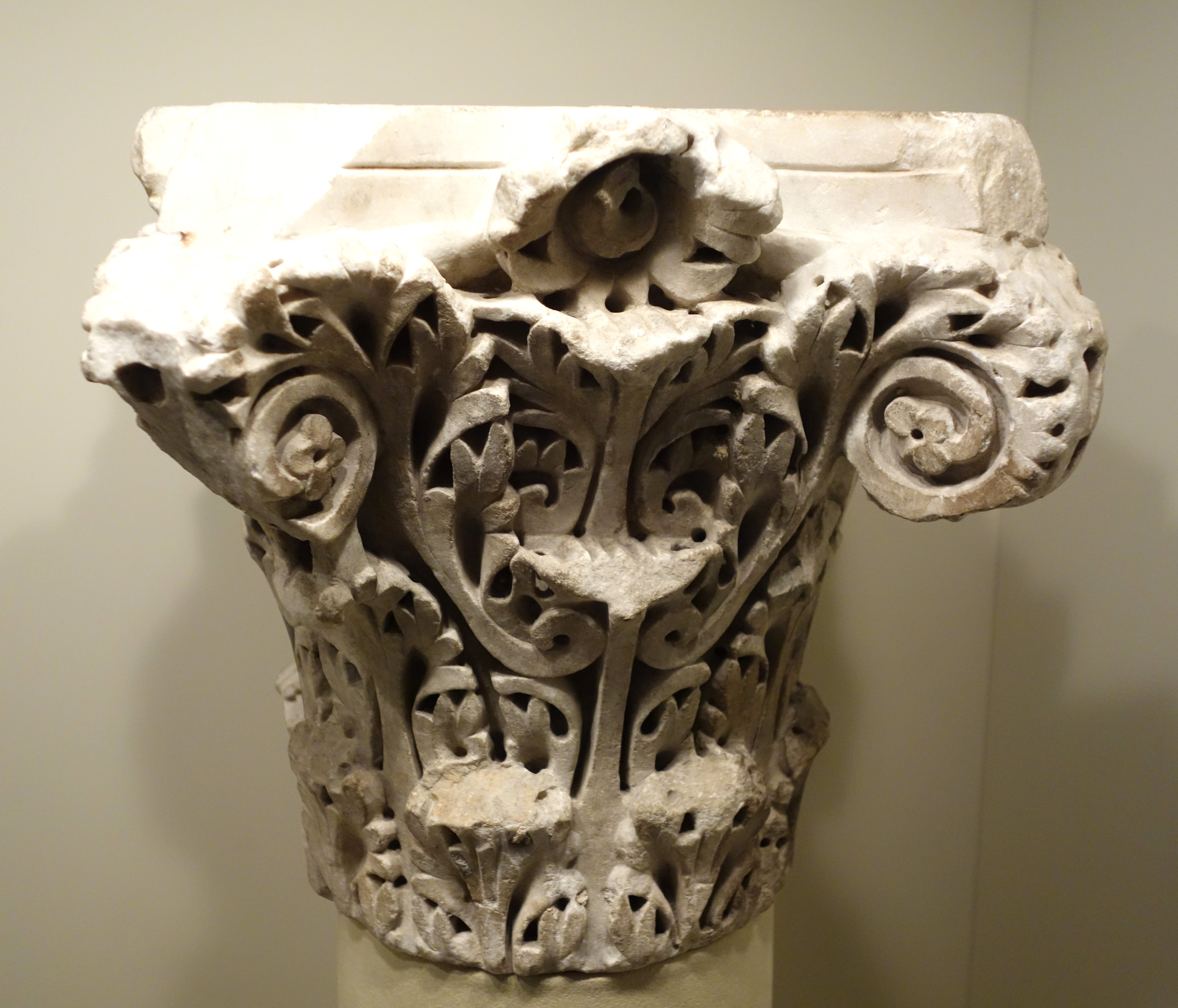
Islamic capital with acanthuses, 10th century, marble, Cincinnati Art Museum, US

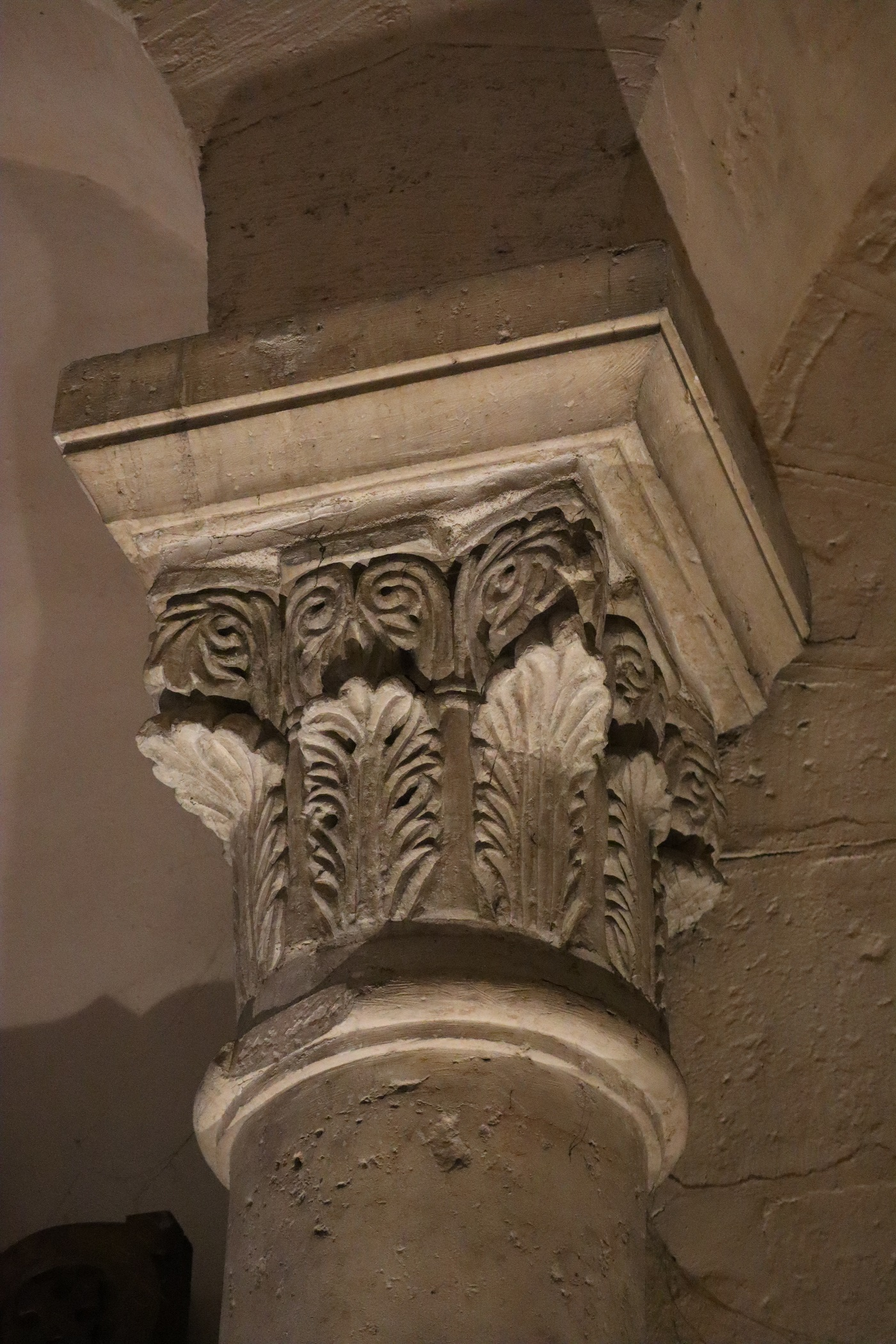
Romanesque quasi-Corinthian capital of the Church of St. Philibert, Tournus, France, unknown architect or sculptor, c.1008 to mid-11th century

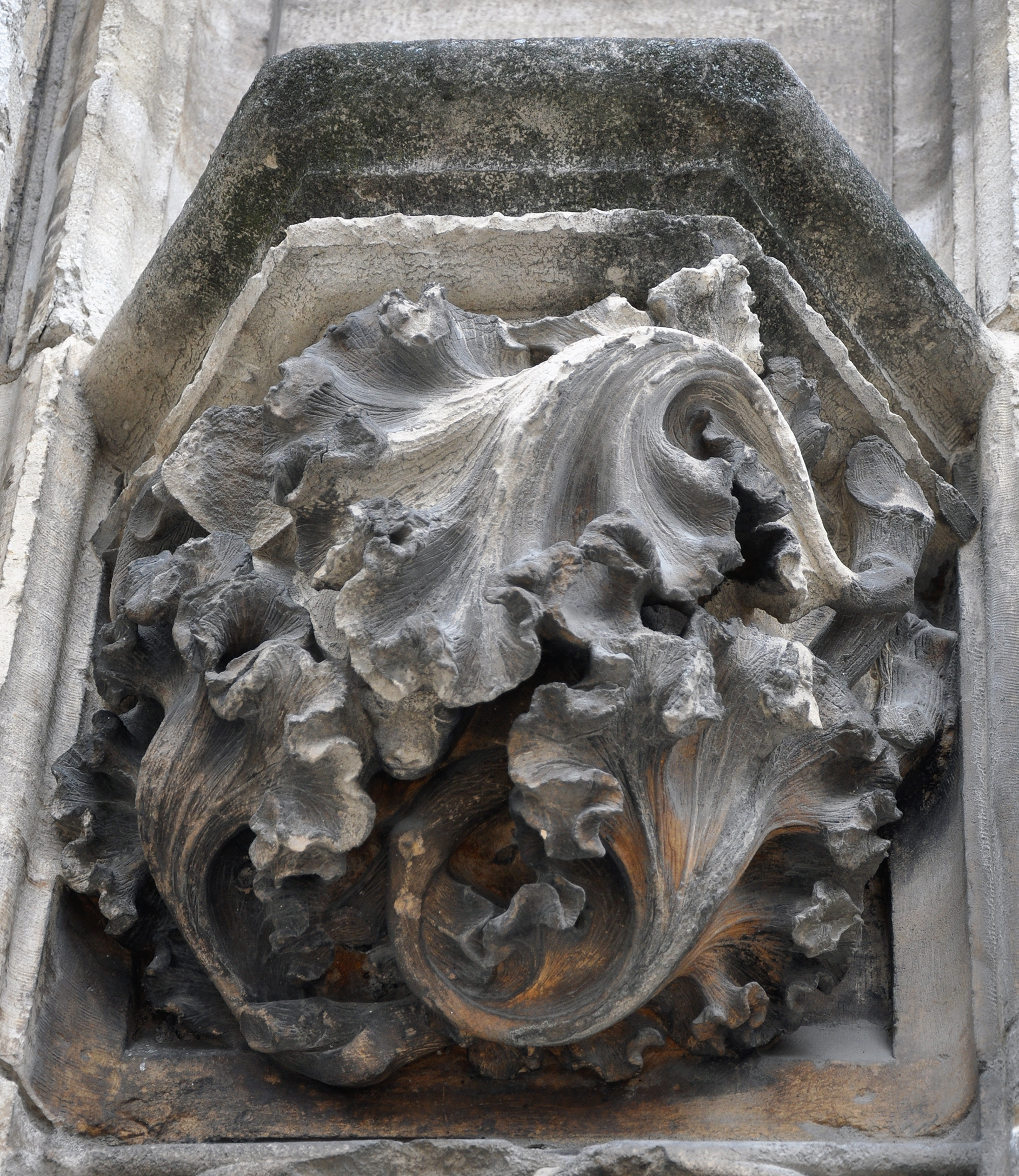
Gothic acanthus on a corbel of the Vienne Cathedral, Vienne, France, unknown architect or sculptor, c.1130-1529

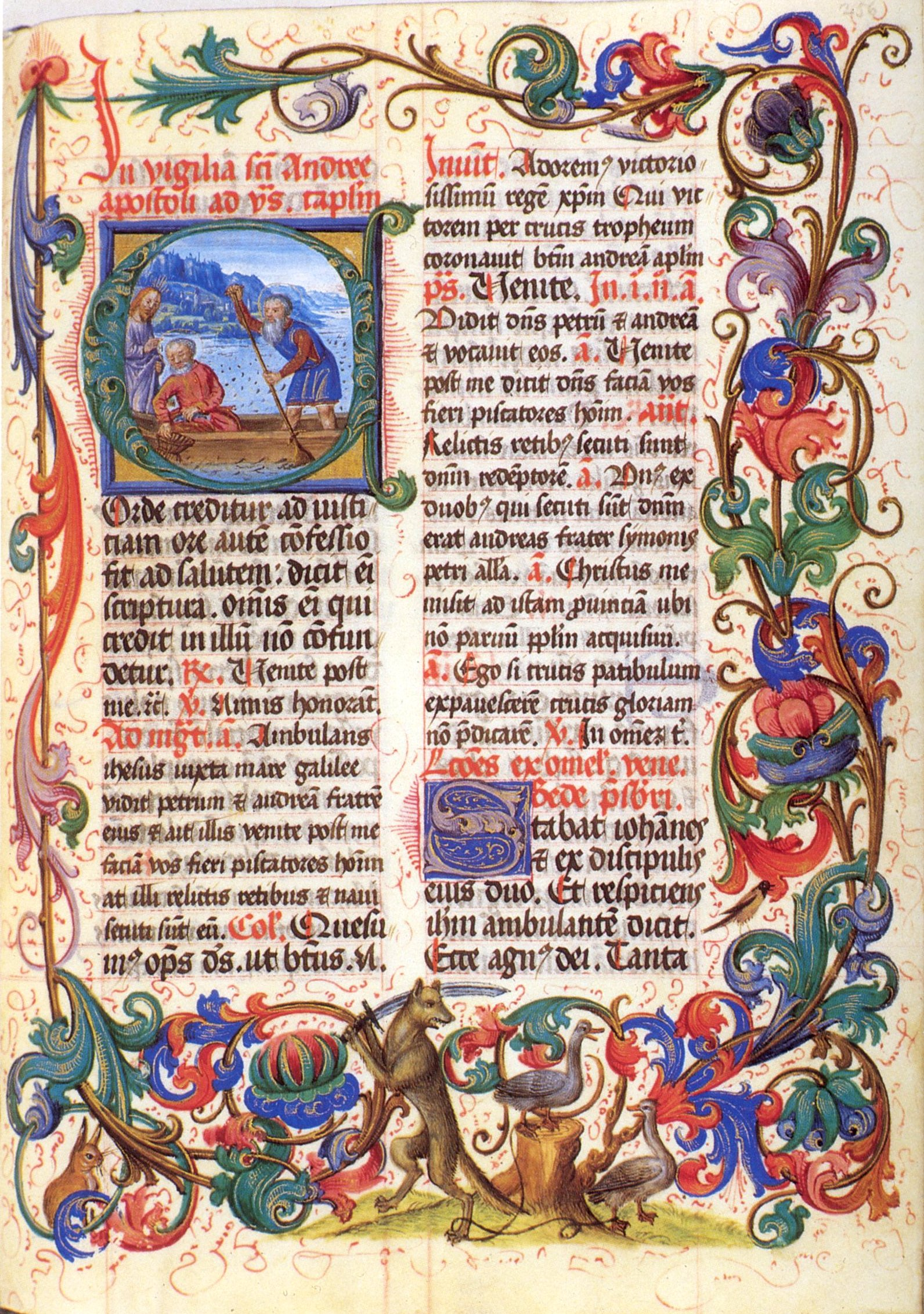
Gothic acanthuses on a page of the Codex Salemitanus IX c, 15th century, tempera colors, gold paint, gold leaf, and ink on parchment, Heidelberg University Library, Heidelberg, Germany

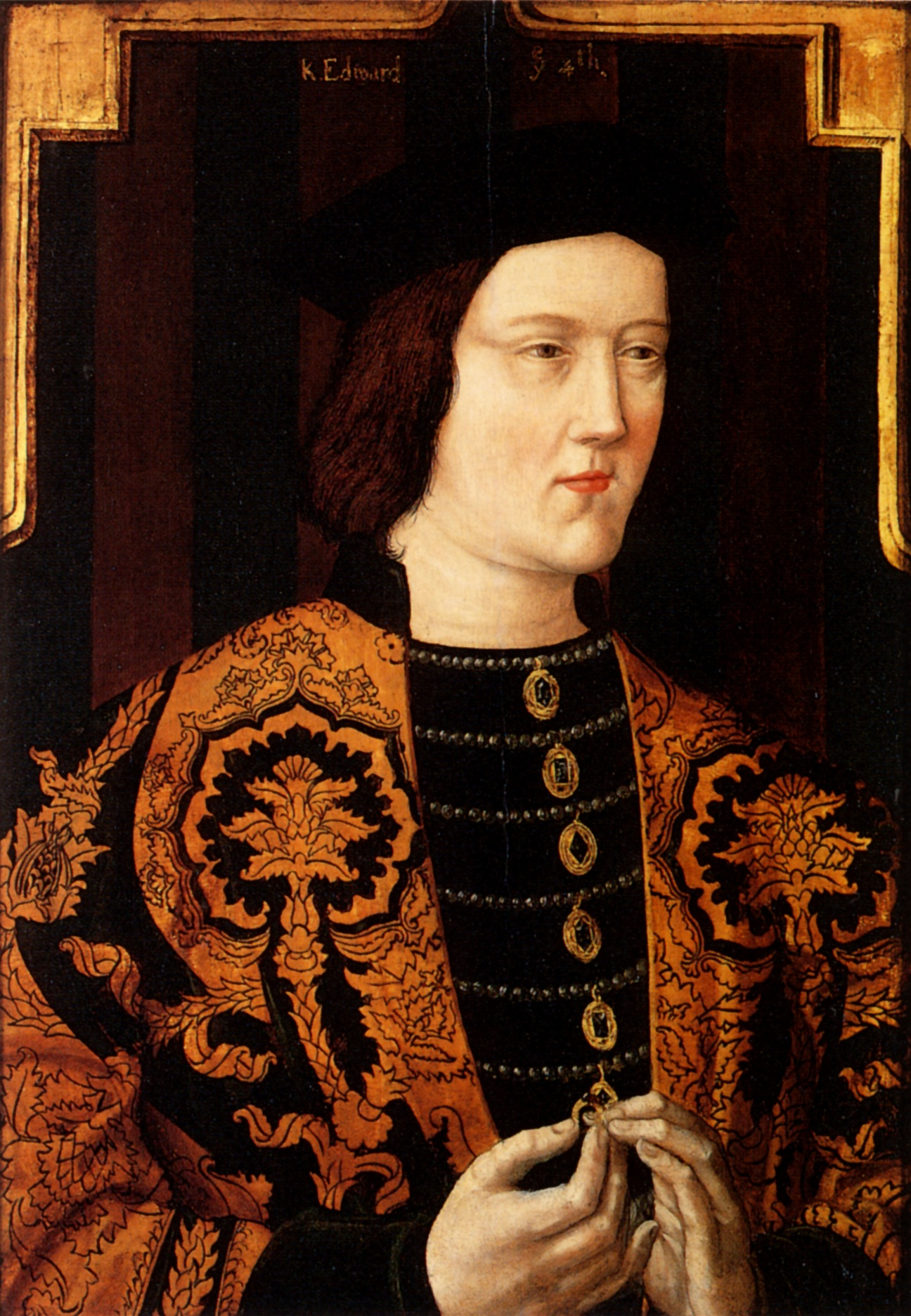
Renaissance acanthuses on the fabric worn by king Edward IV, portrait painted by Lucas Horenbout, c.1470-1475

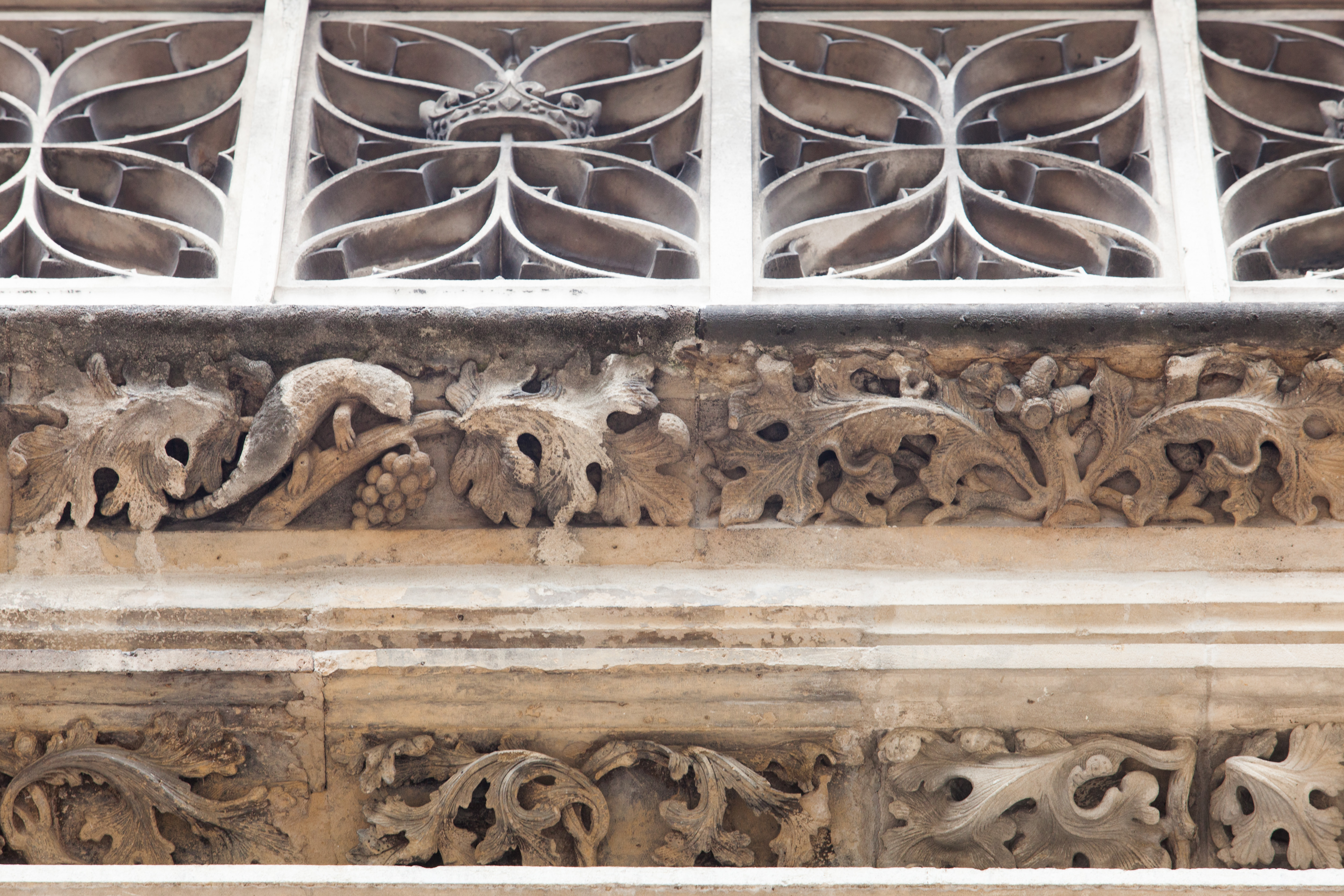
Gothic acanthuses on the Hôtel de Cluny, Paris, unknown architect or sculptor, 1485-1510

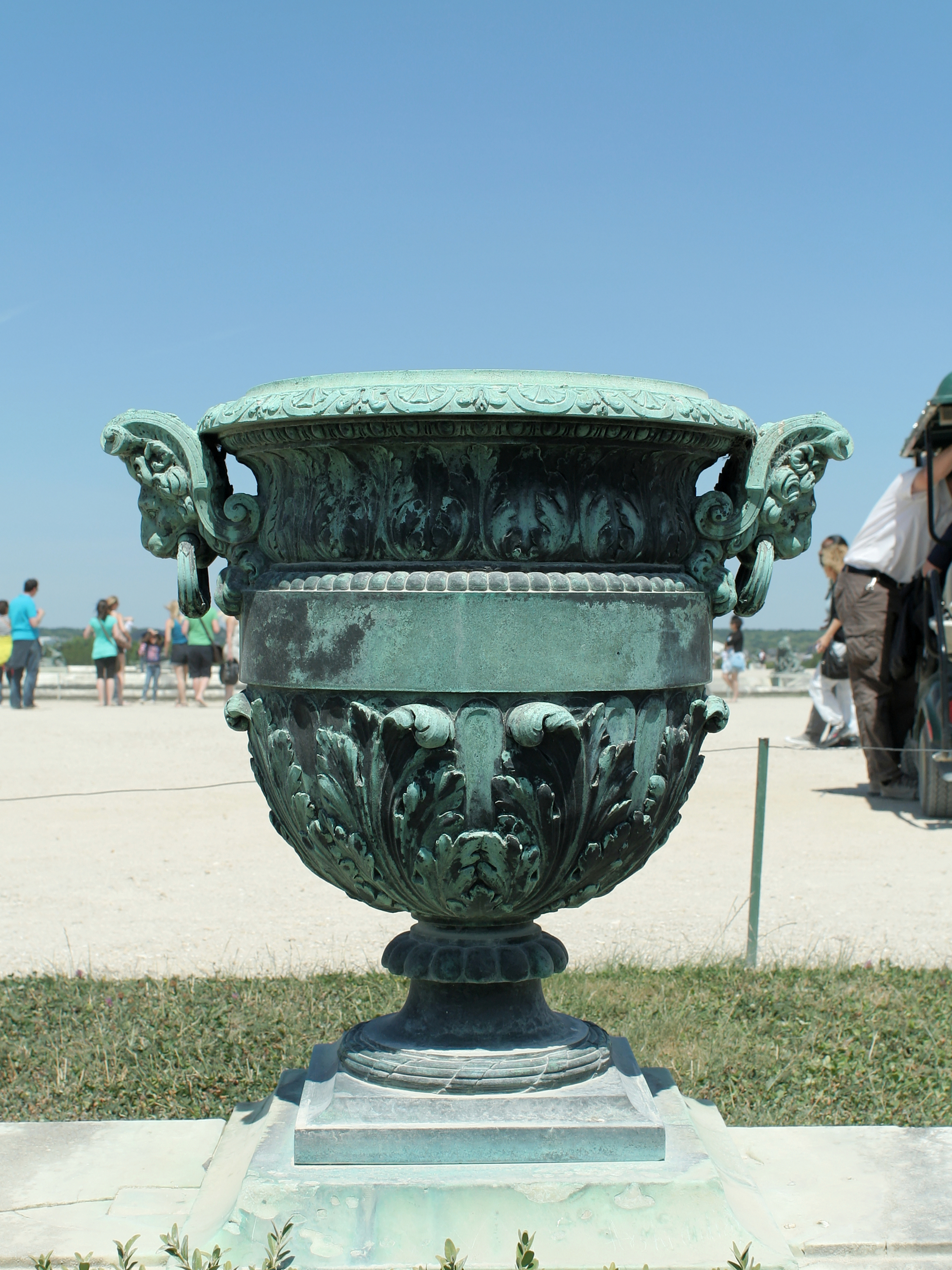
Baroque garden vase with acanthuses, by Claude Ballin, 1665, bronze, Gardens of Versailles

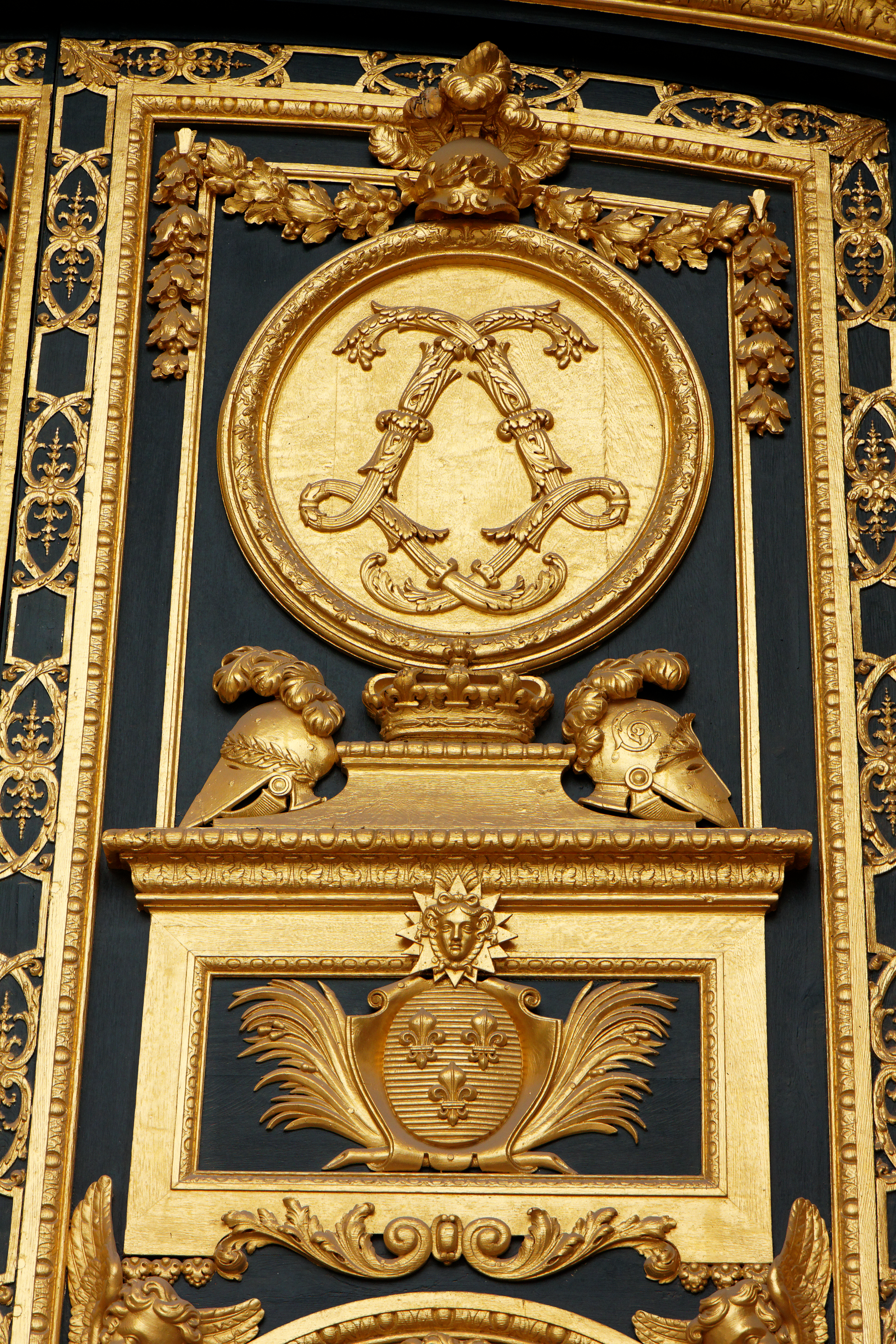
Baroque acanthuses of a monogram of Louis XIV on the entrance door of the Dôme des Invalides, Paris, by Jules Hardouin-Mansart, 1677–1706

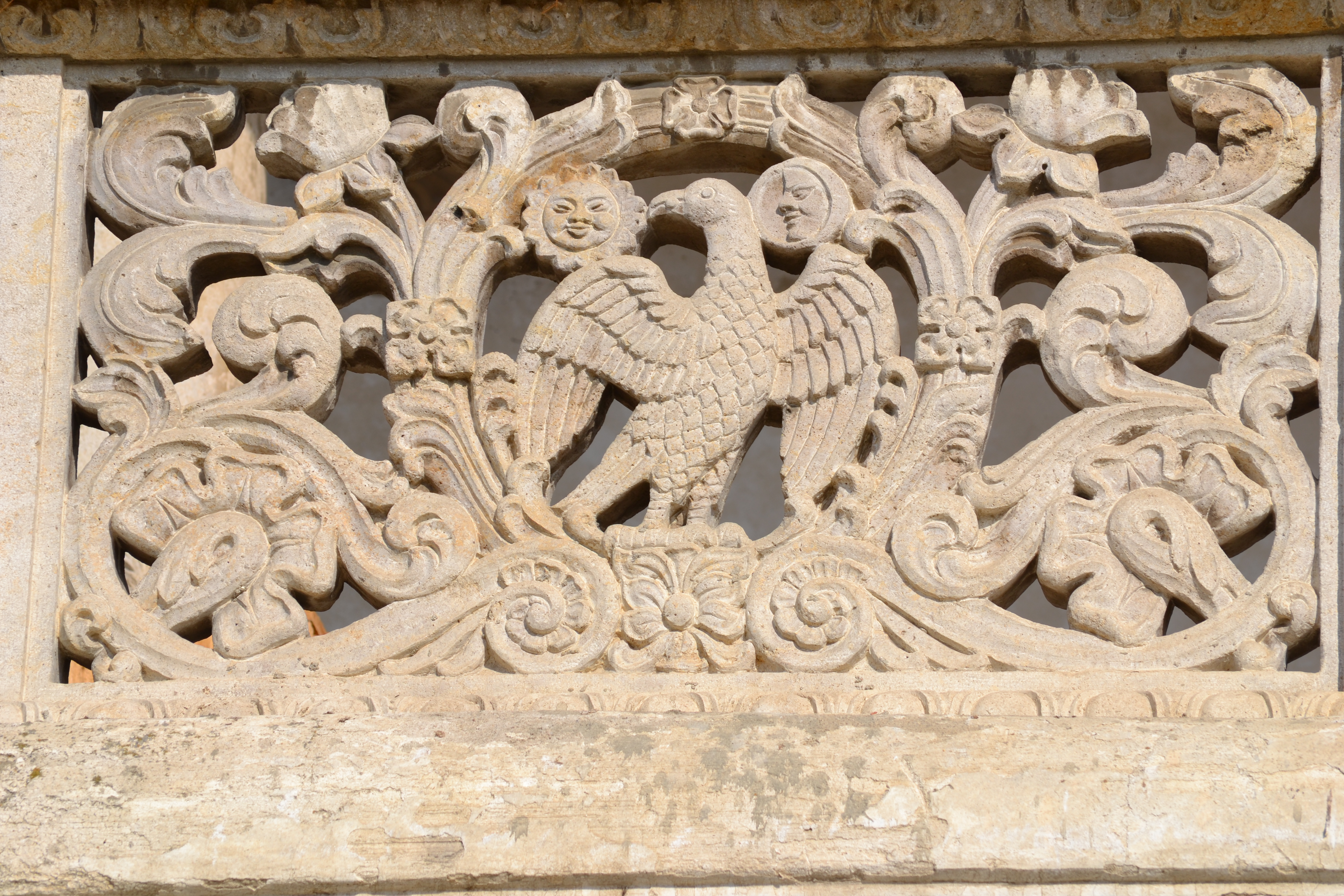
Brâncovenesc acanthuses of a railing of the Potlogi Palace, Potlogi, Romania, unknown architect or sculptor, 1698

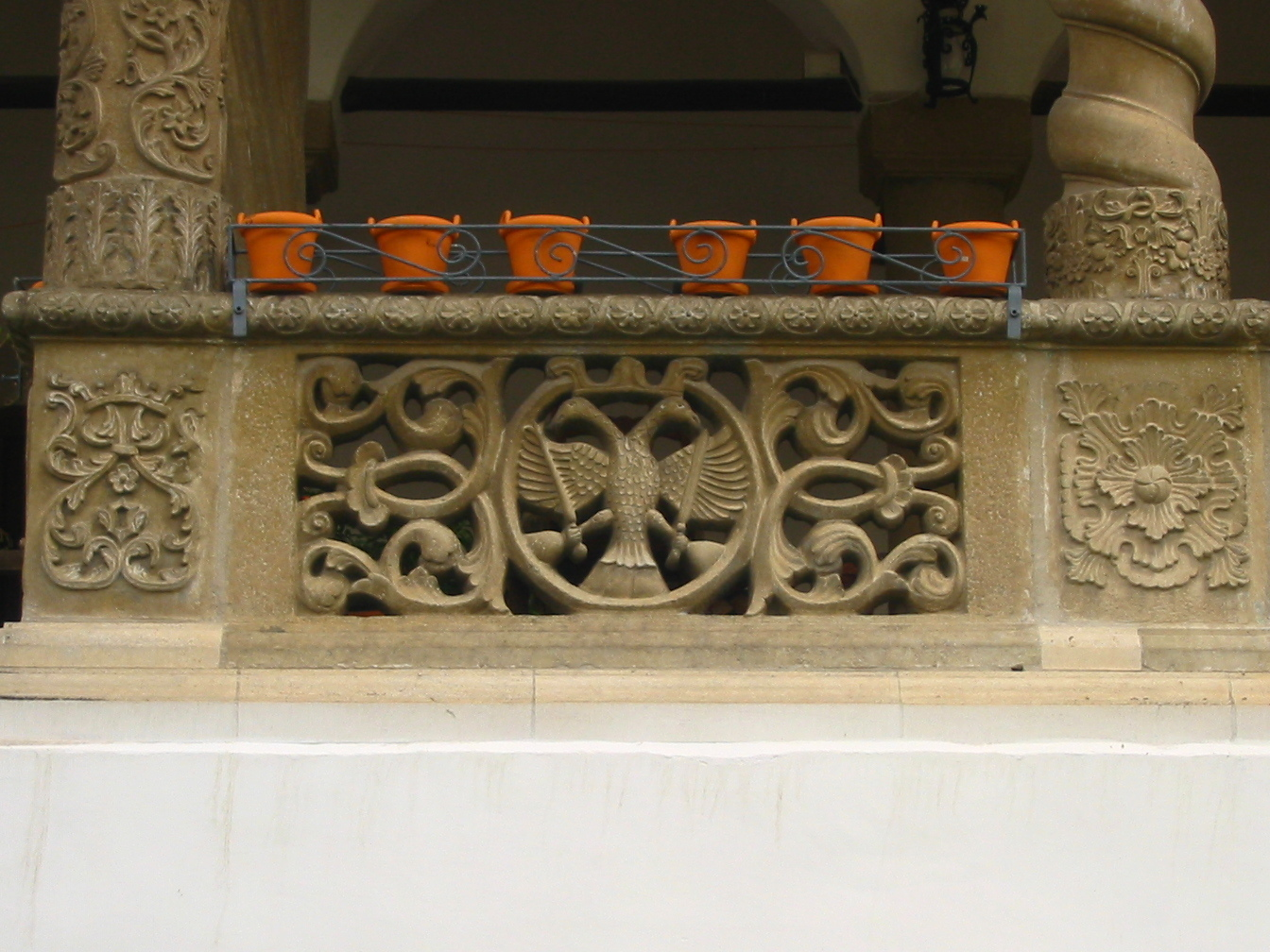
Brâncovenesc acanthuses of a railing of the Horezu Monastery, Horezu, Romania, unknown architect or sculptor, 17th-18th centuries

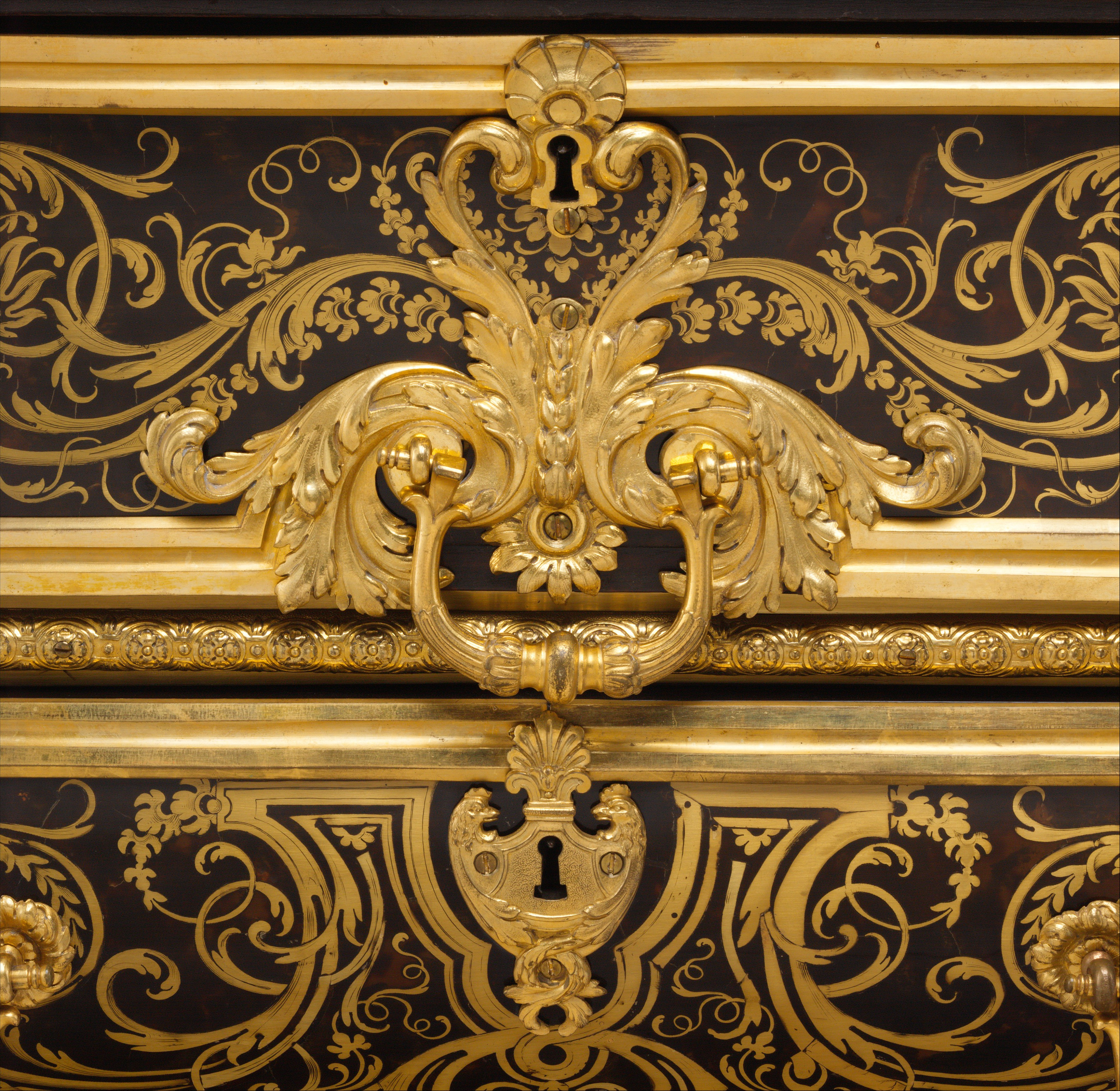
Baroque acanthuses on a commode, by André-Charles Boulle, c.1710–1720, walnut veneered with ebony, marquetry of engraved brass and tortoiseshell, and gilt-bronze mounts, Metropolitan Museum of Art

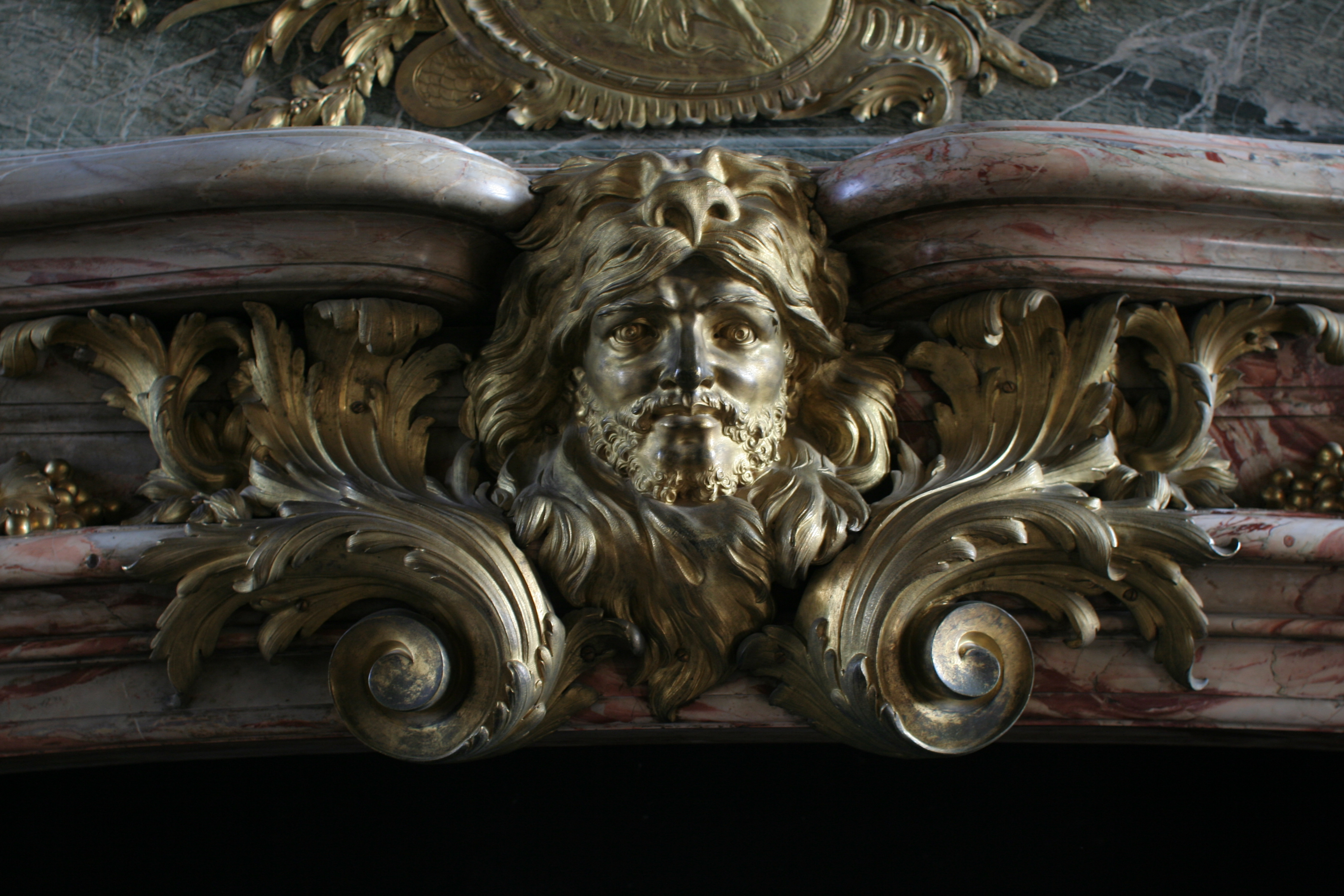
Baroque mascaron with acanthuses in the Salon d'Hercule, 1724–1736, designed by Robert de Cotte, Jacques Gabriel

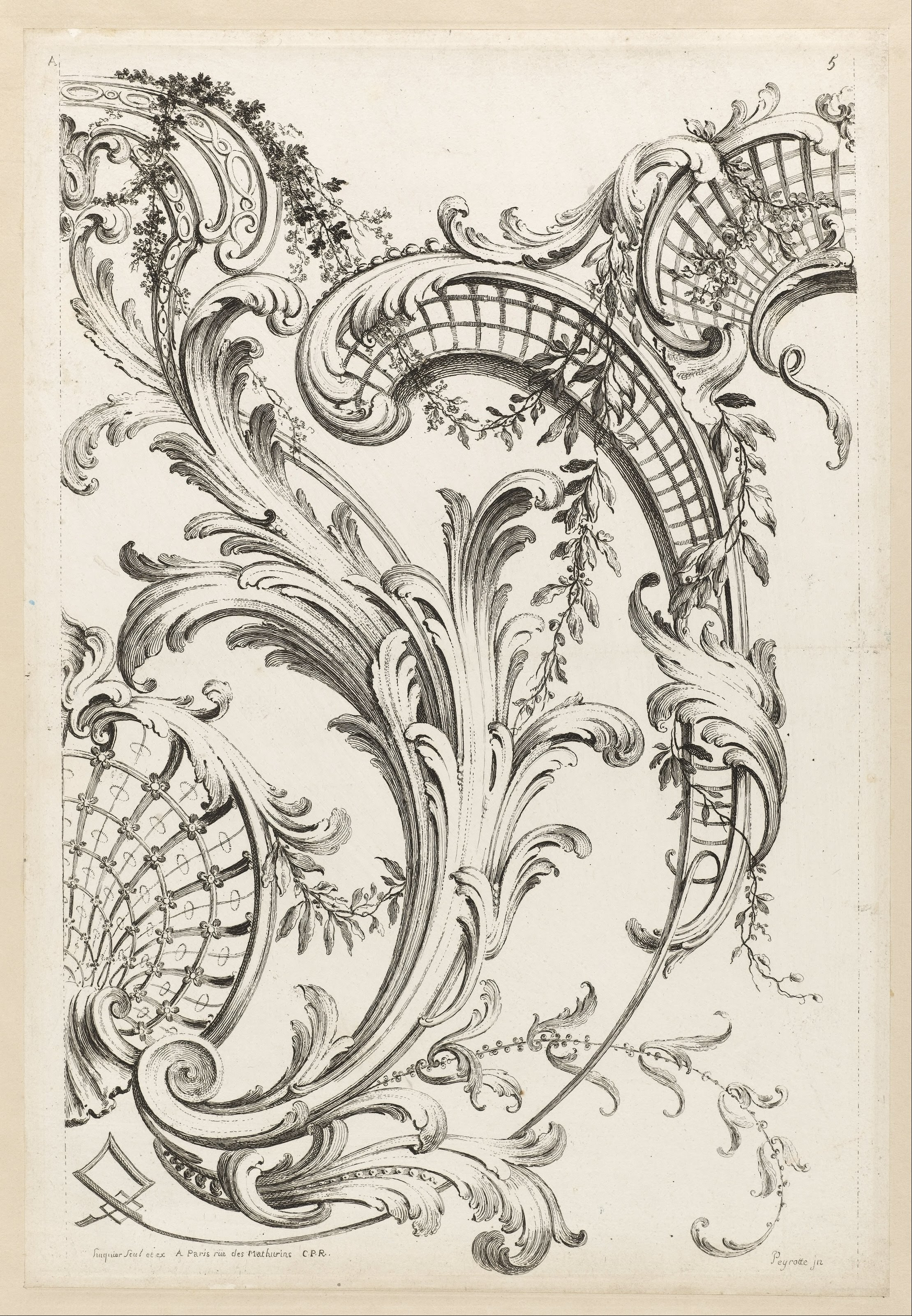
Rococo acanthuses, by Alexis Peyrotte, 1740, Cooper Hewitt, Smithsonian Design Museum, New York

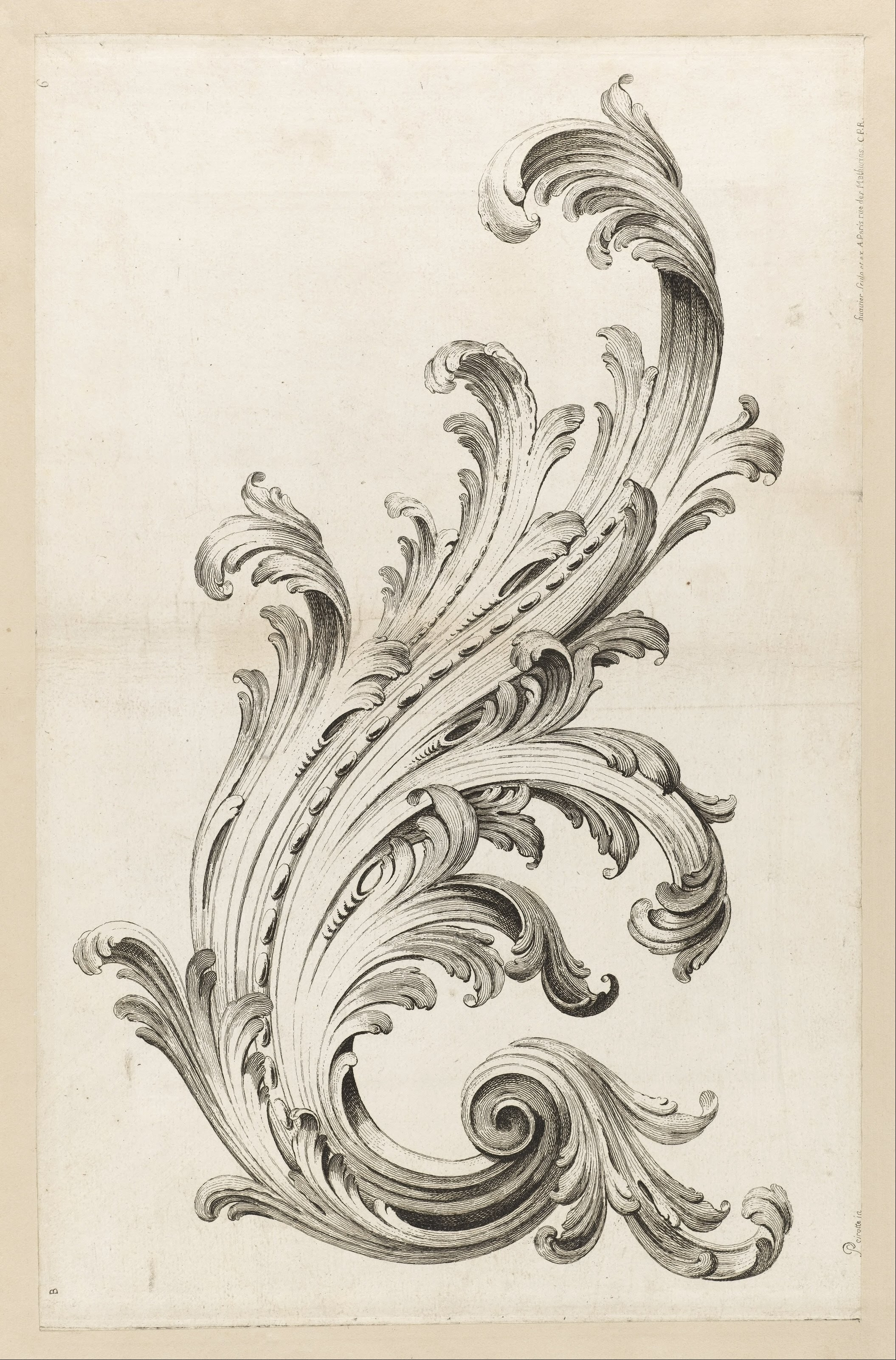
Rococo acanthus, by Alexis Peyrotte, 1740, Cooper Hewitt, Smithsonian Design Museum, New York

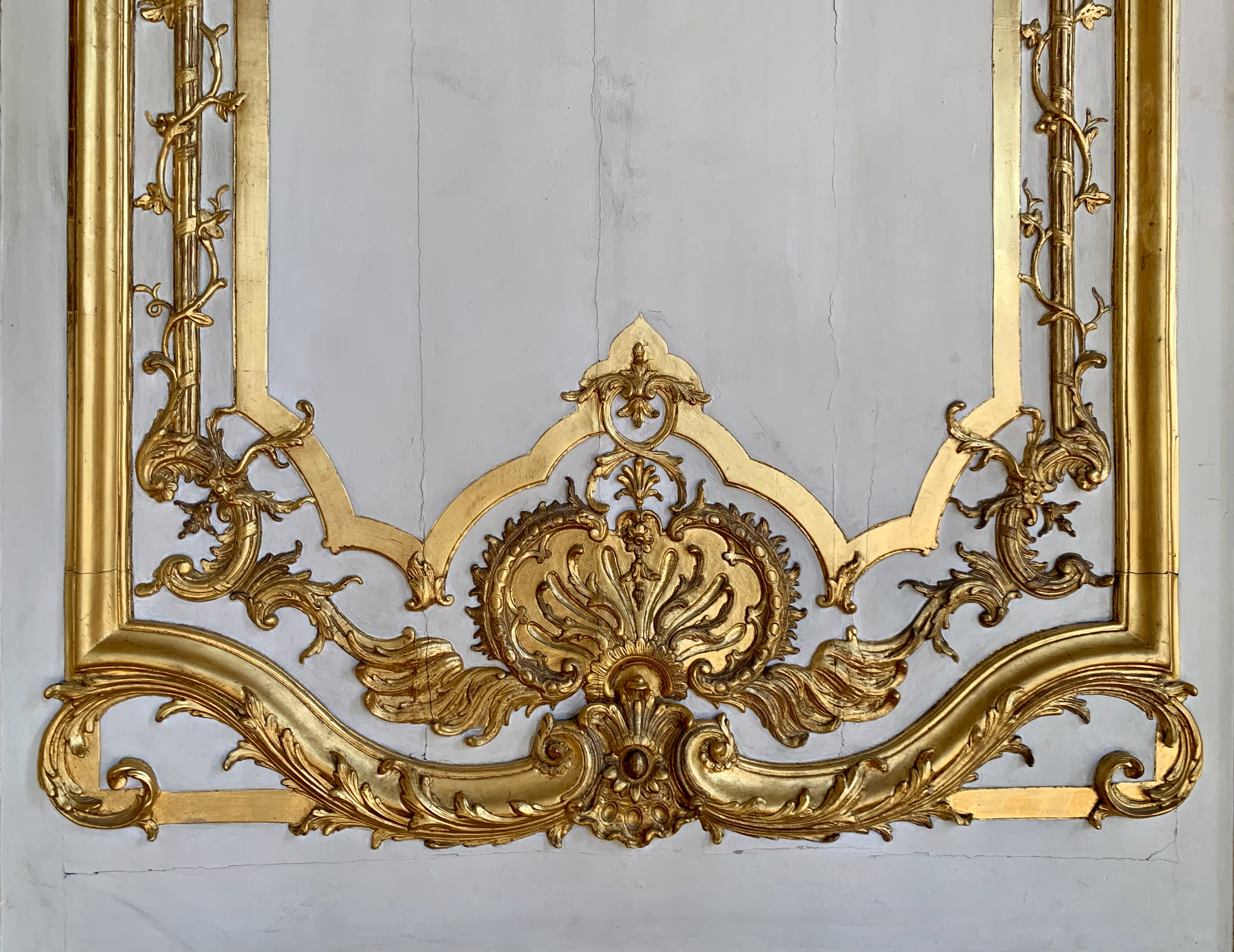
Rococo acanthuses on a wall of the oval salon of the Princesse in Hôtel de Soubise, Paris, by Germain Boffrand, 1740

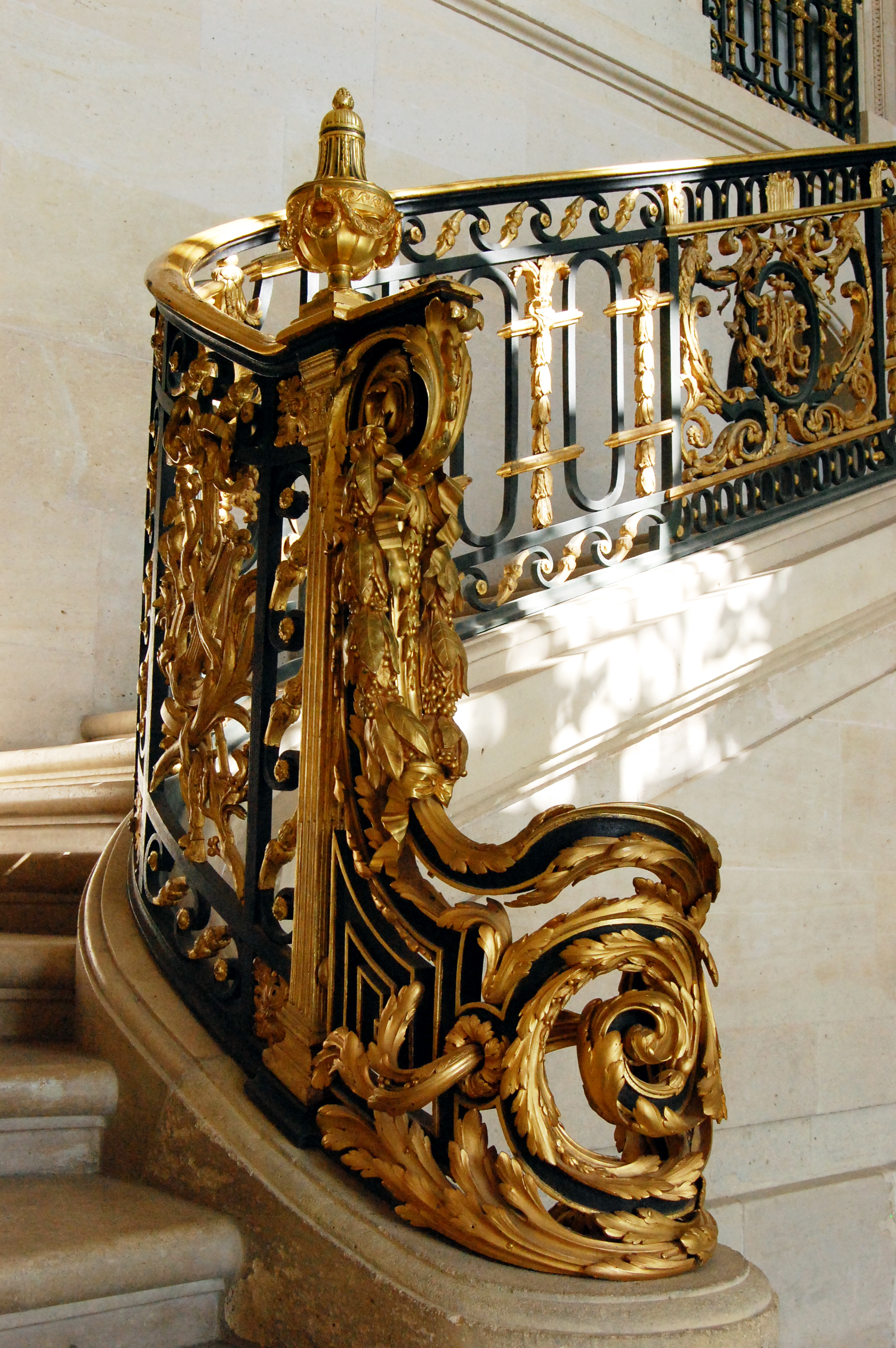
Rococo acanthuses of a staircase railing in the Petit Trianon, Versailles, France, by Ange-Jacques Gabriel, 1764

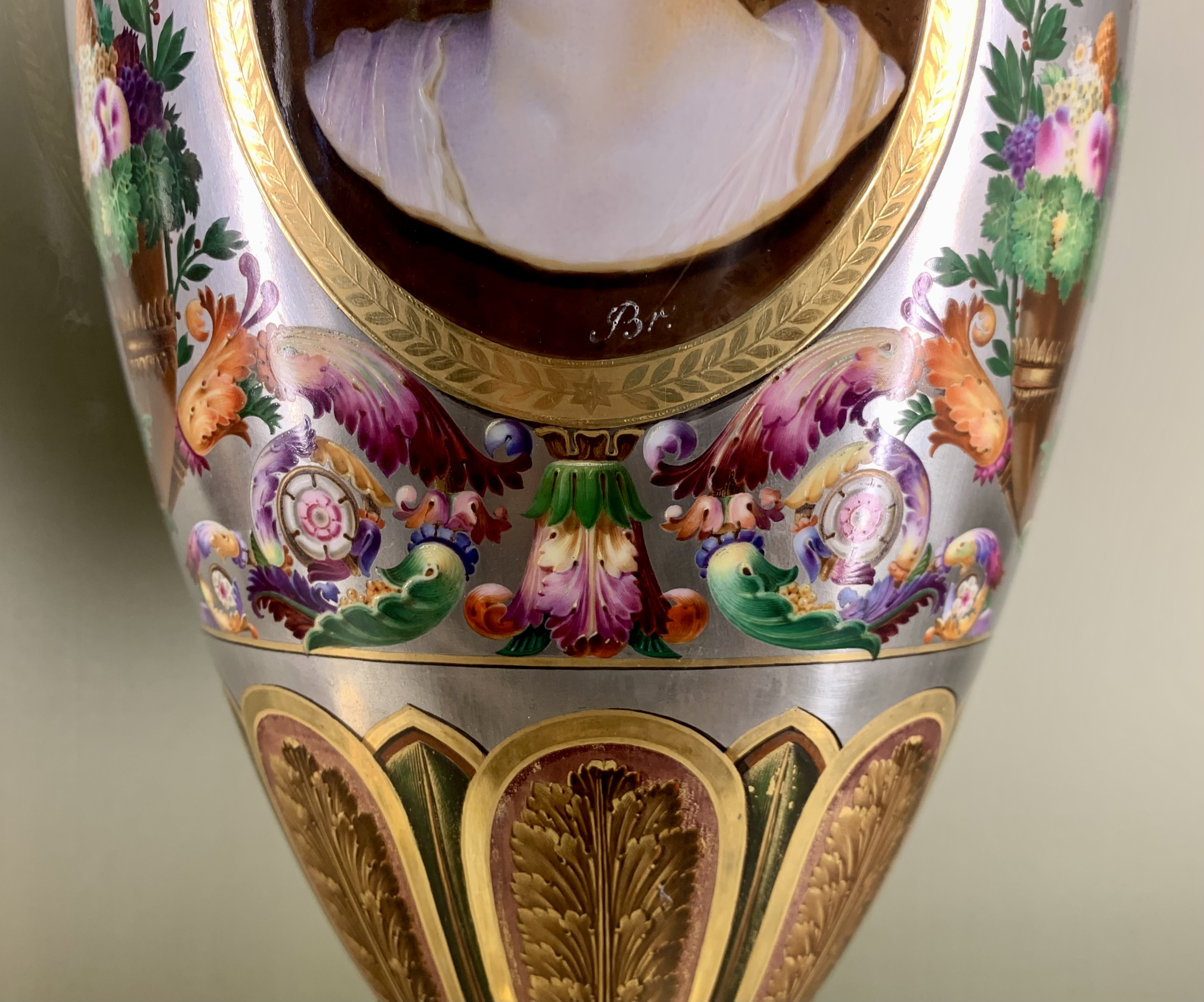
Neoclassical acanthuses on a vase, by the Sèvres Porcelain Manufactory, 1814, hard-paste porcelain with platinum background and gilt bronze mounts, Louvre

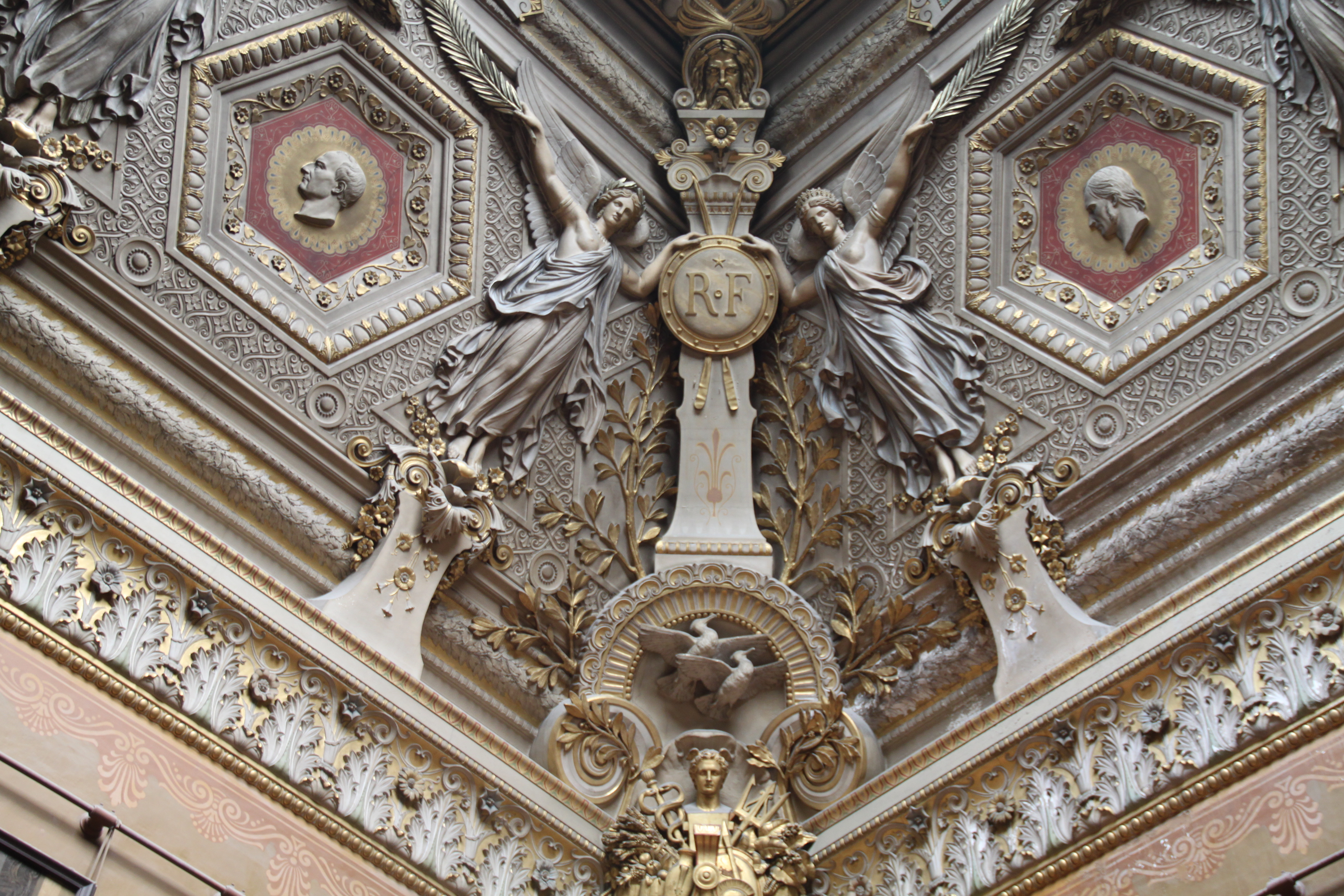
Neoclassical acanthuses on the ceiling of the Salon des Sept cheminées, Louvre Palace, Paris, by Francisque Duret, 1851

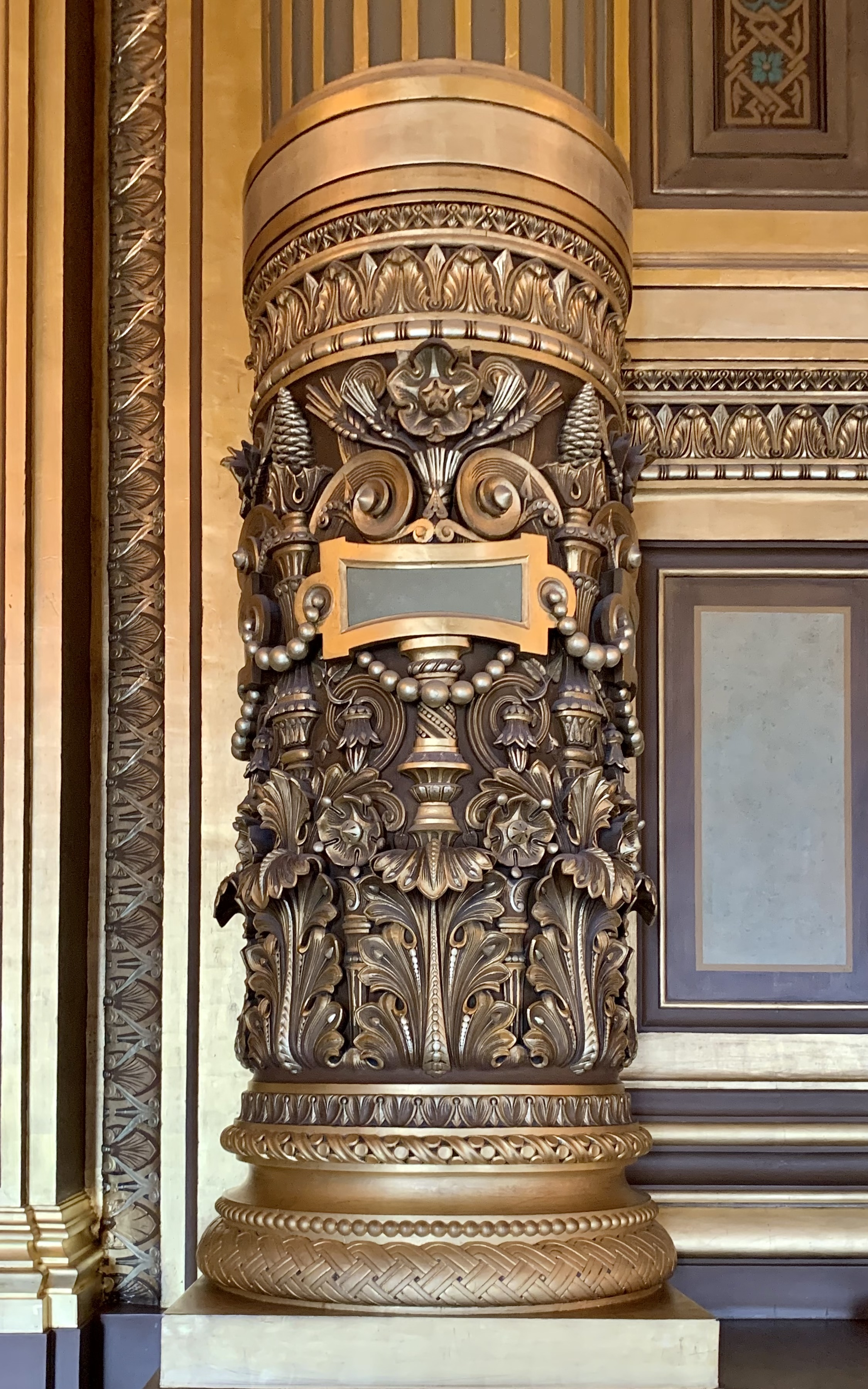
Beaux Arts acanthuses on the base of a column in the Grand Foyer of the Palais Garnier, Paris, designed by Charles Garnier, 1860–1875

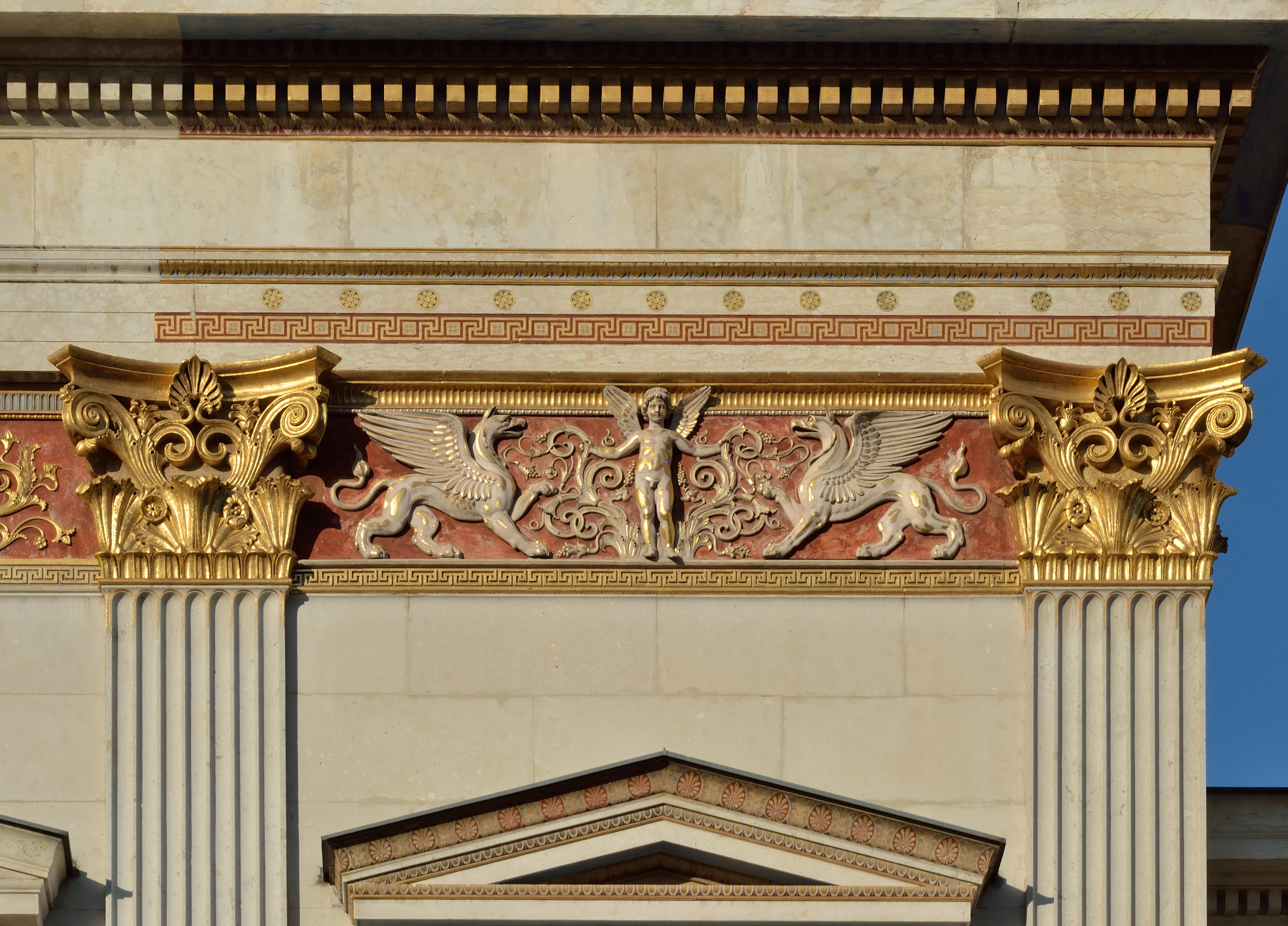
Greek Revival Corinthian pilasters on the Austrian Parliament Building, Vienna, by Theophil von Hansen, 1873–1883

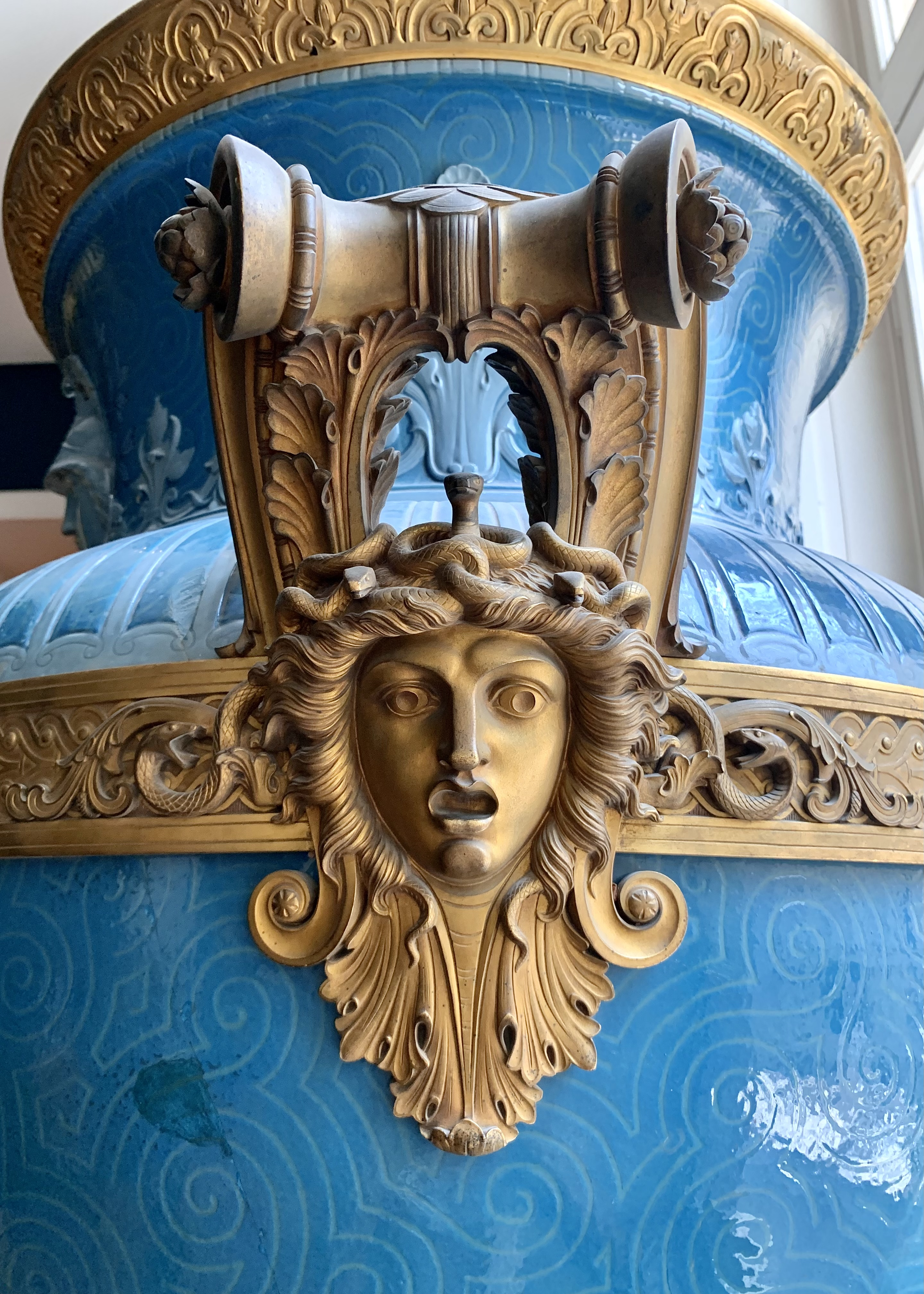
Neoclassical Medusa mascaron with acanthuses on a handle of the Mayeux Vase, by the Sèvres Porcelain Manufactory, 1878, hard-paste porcelain, gilded copper molding on the collar, and gilded bronze handles, Louvre

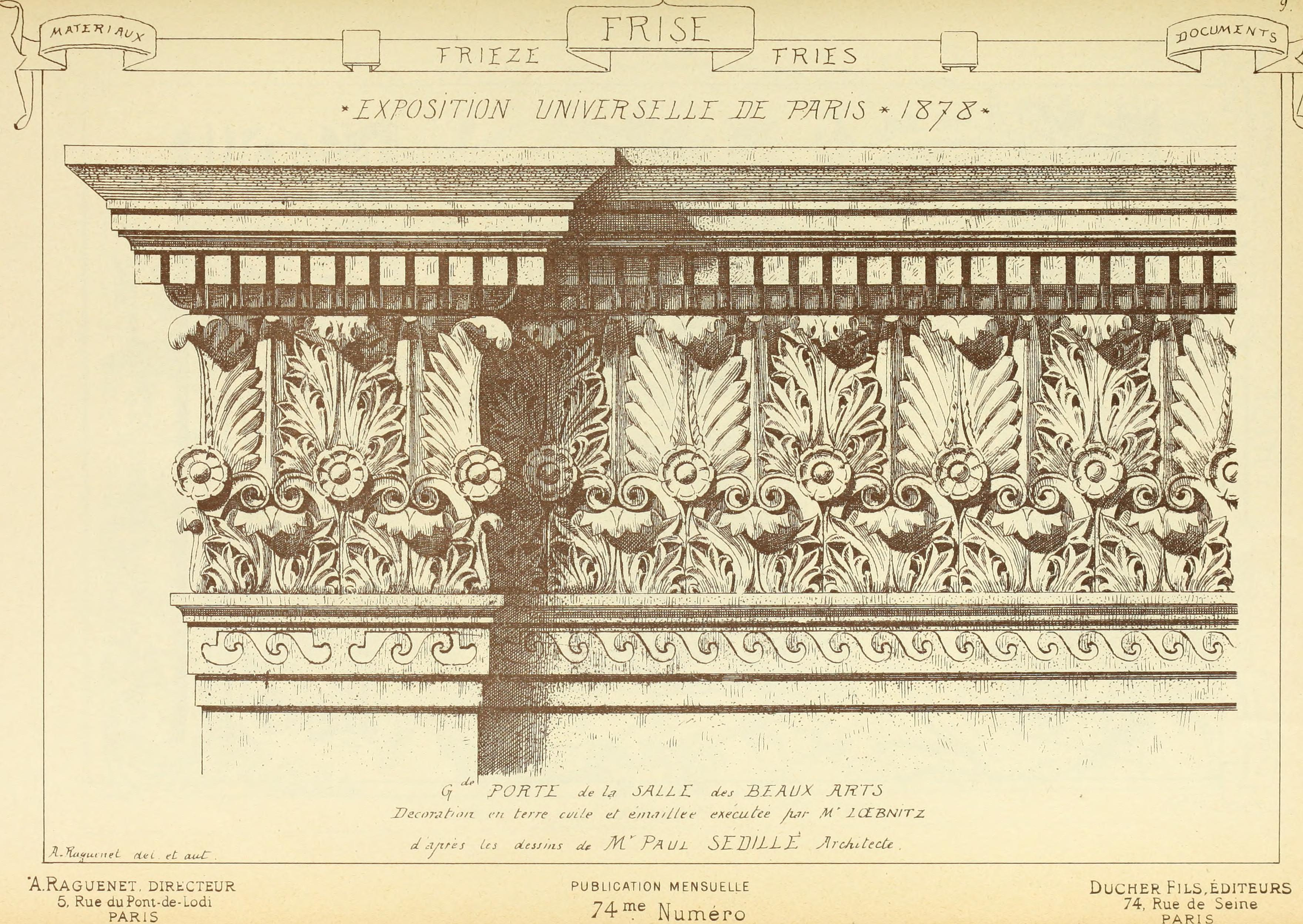
Neoclassical terracotta and enamel acanthuses of the door of the fine art hall of the Exposition Universelle of 1878, Paris, by Paul Sedille, 1878

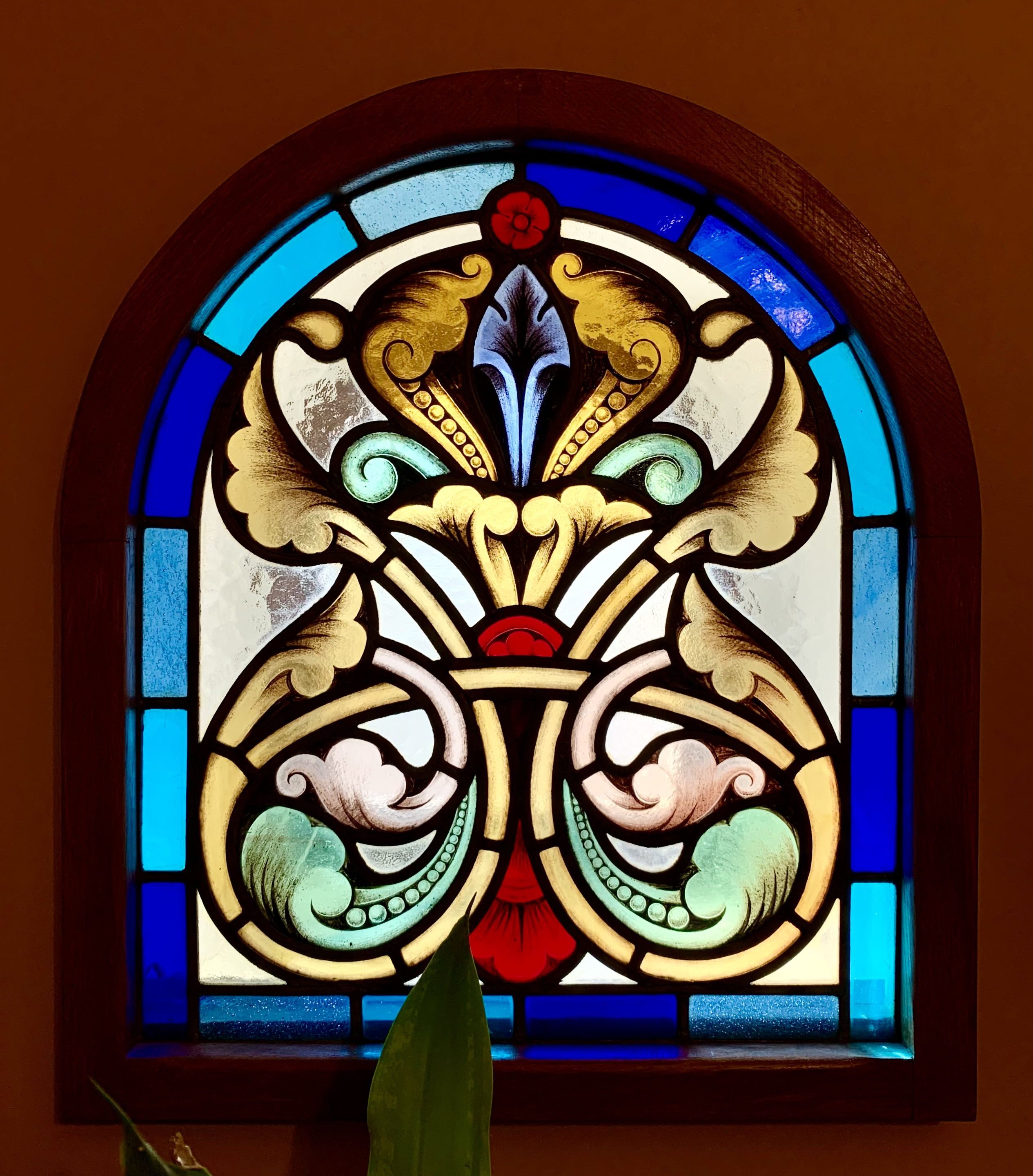
Romanian Revival acanthuses on a stained-glass window of the Kiseleff Roadside Buffet (Șoseaua Kiseleff no. 4), Bucharest, Romania, by Ion Mincu, 1889-1892

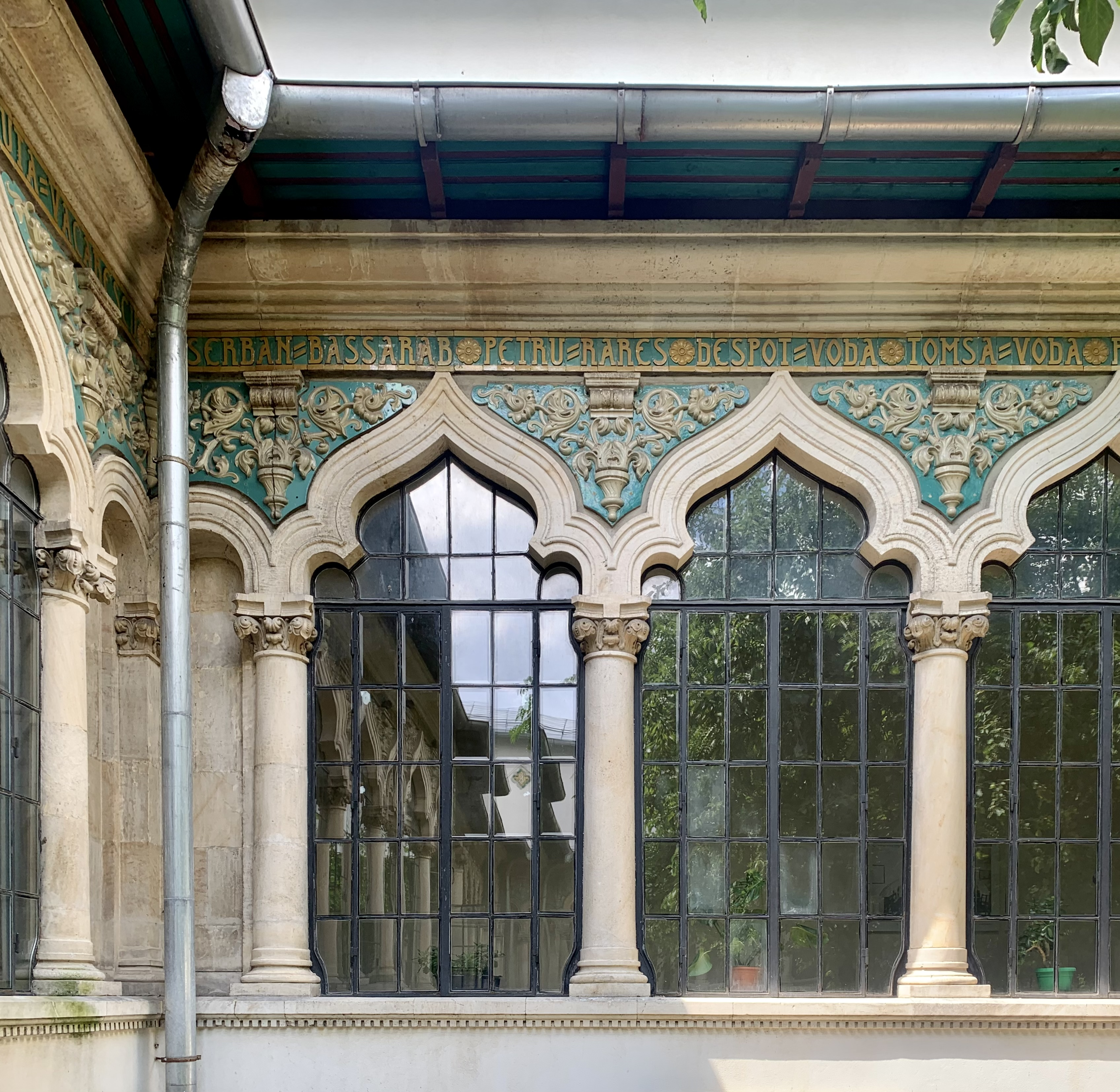
Romanian Revival glazed ceramic acanthus in the courtyard of the Central Girls' School (Strada Icoanei no. 3-5), Bucharest, by Ion Mincu, 1890

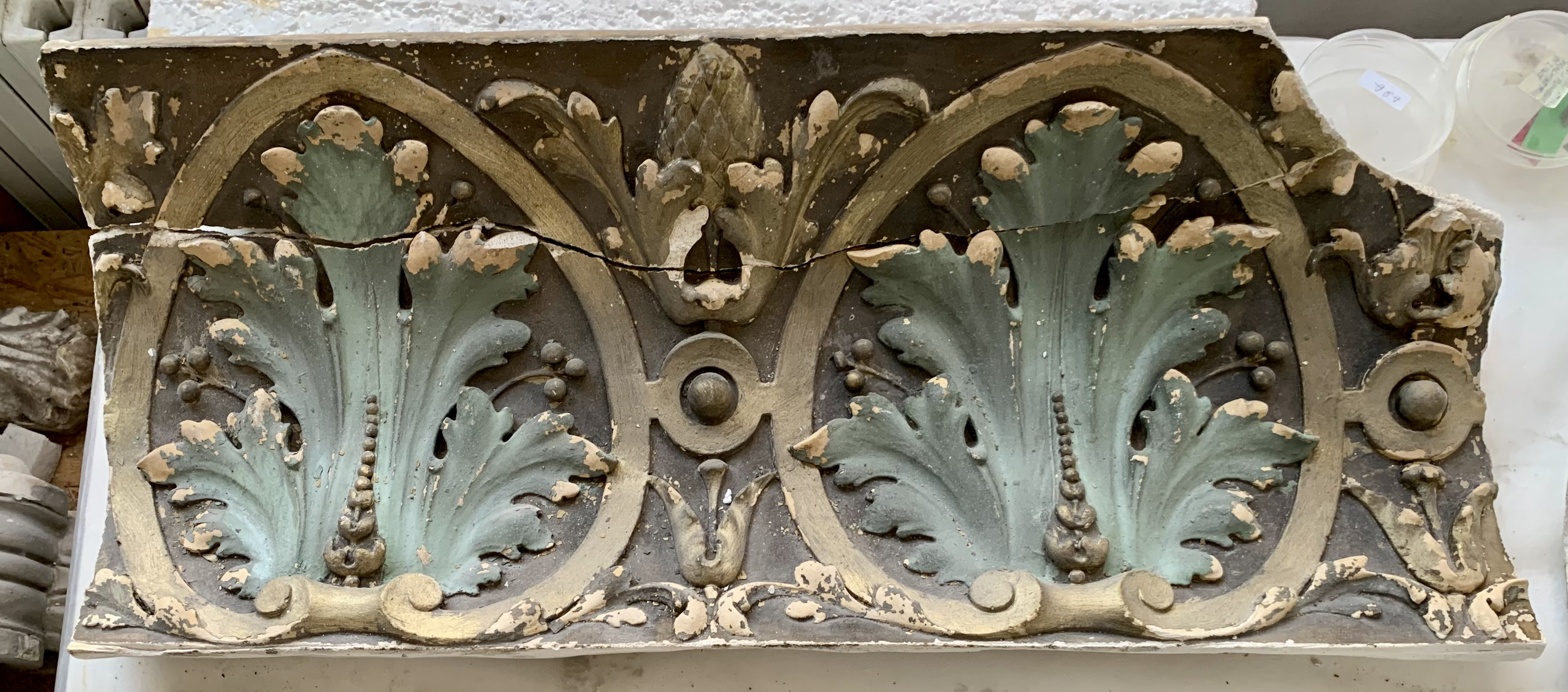
Beaux Arts ceiling stucco fragment from Strada Plantelor no. 4, Bucharest, Romania, unknown architect, 1891

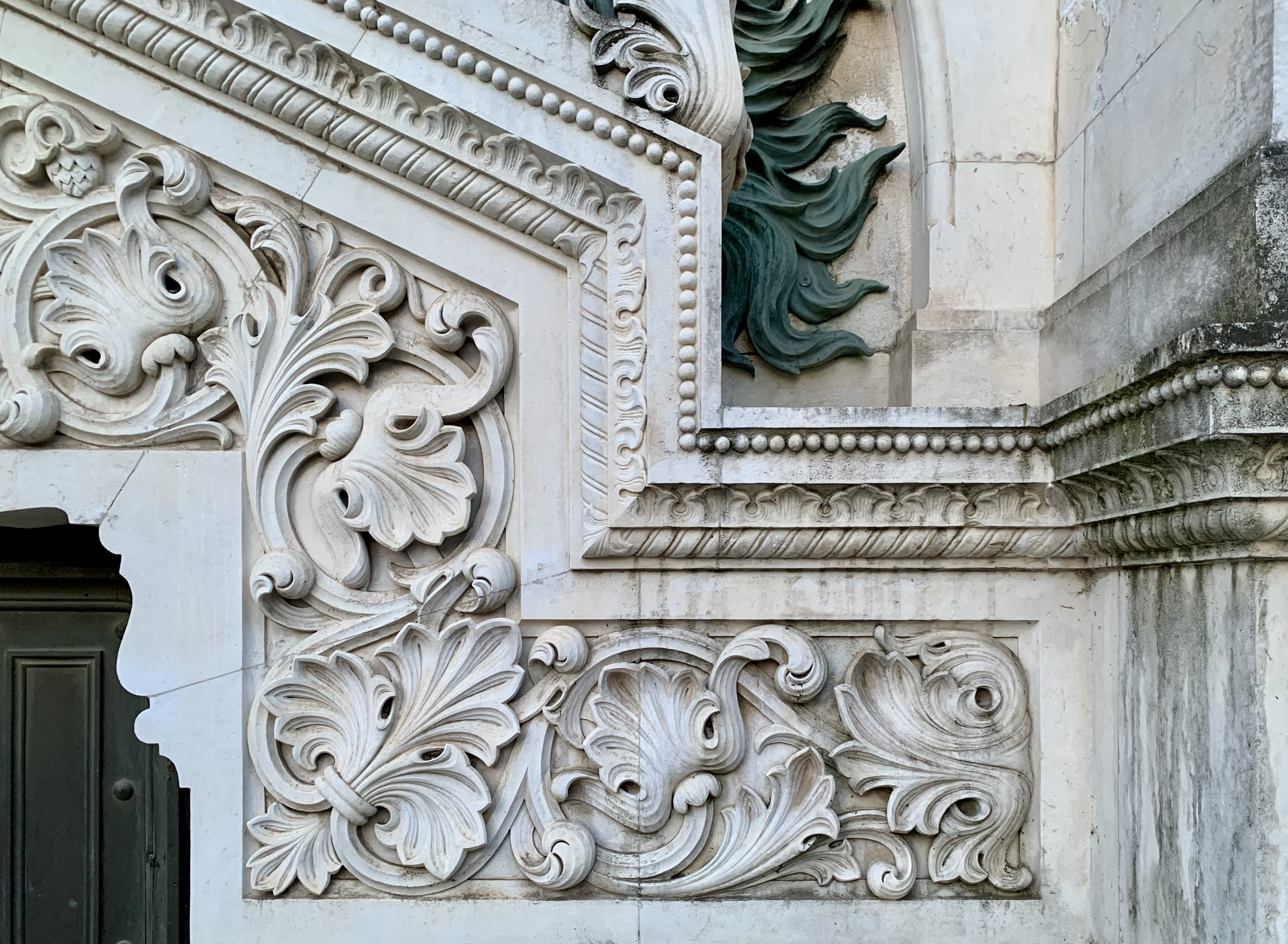
Romanian Revival acanthuses on the Gheorghieff Brothers Tomb, Bellu Cemetery, Bucharest, by Ion Mincu, c.1900

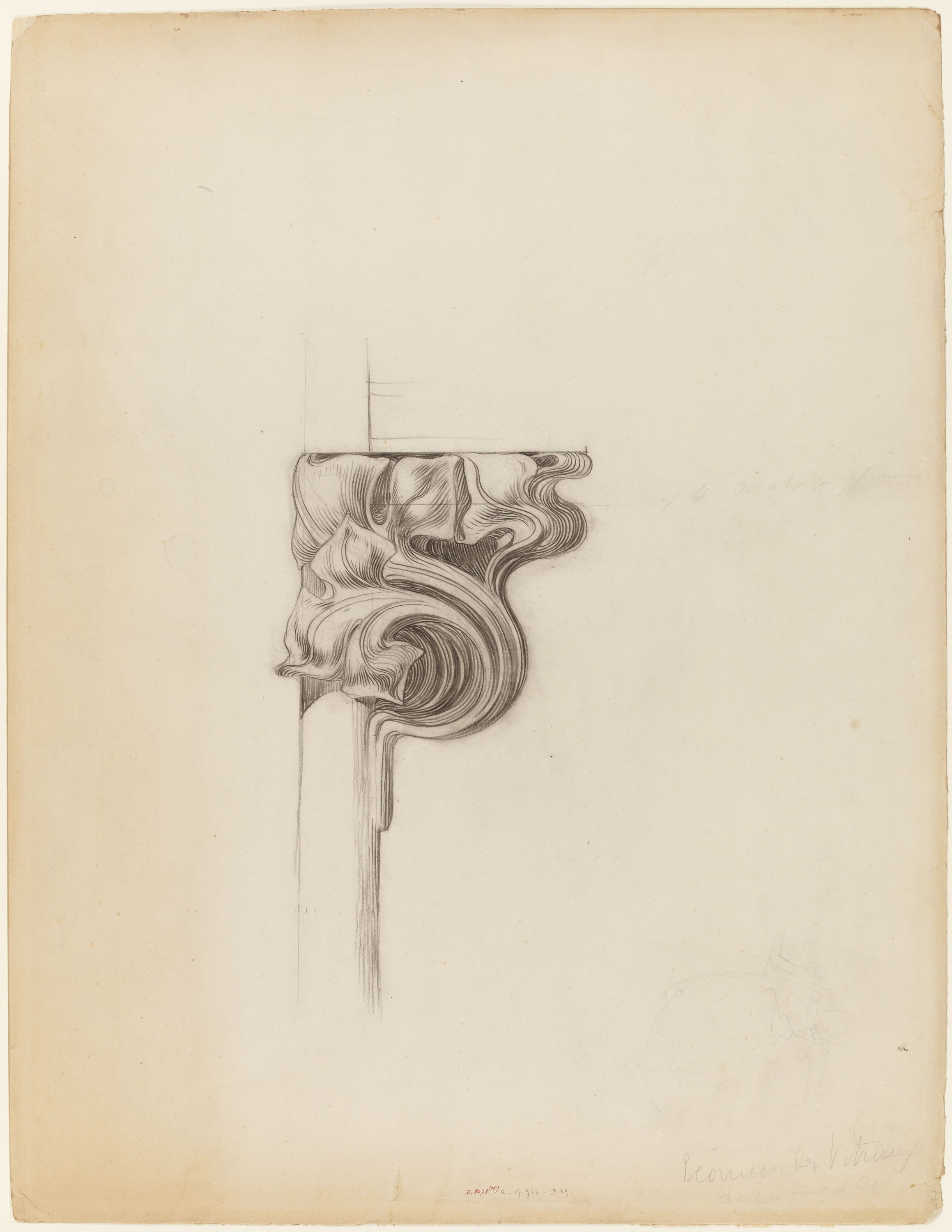
Art Nouveau and Gothic Revival acanthus designed as a bronze element of a stained glass window of Bijouterie Fouquet in Paris, by Alphonse Mucha, c.1900, charcoal drawing, Musée Carnavalet, Paris

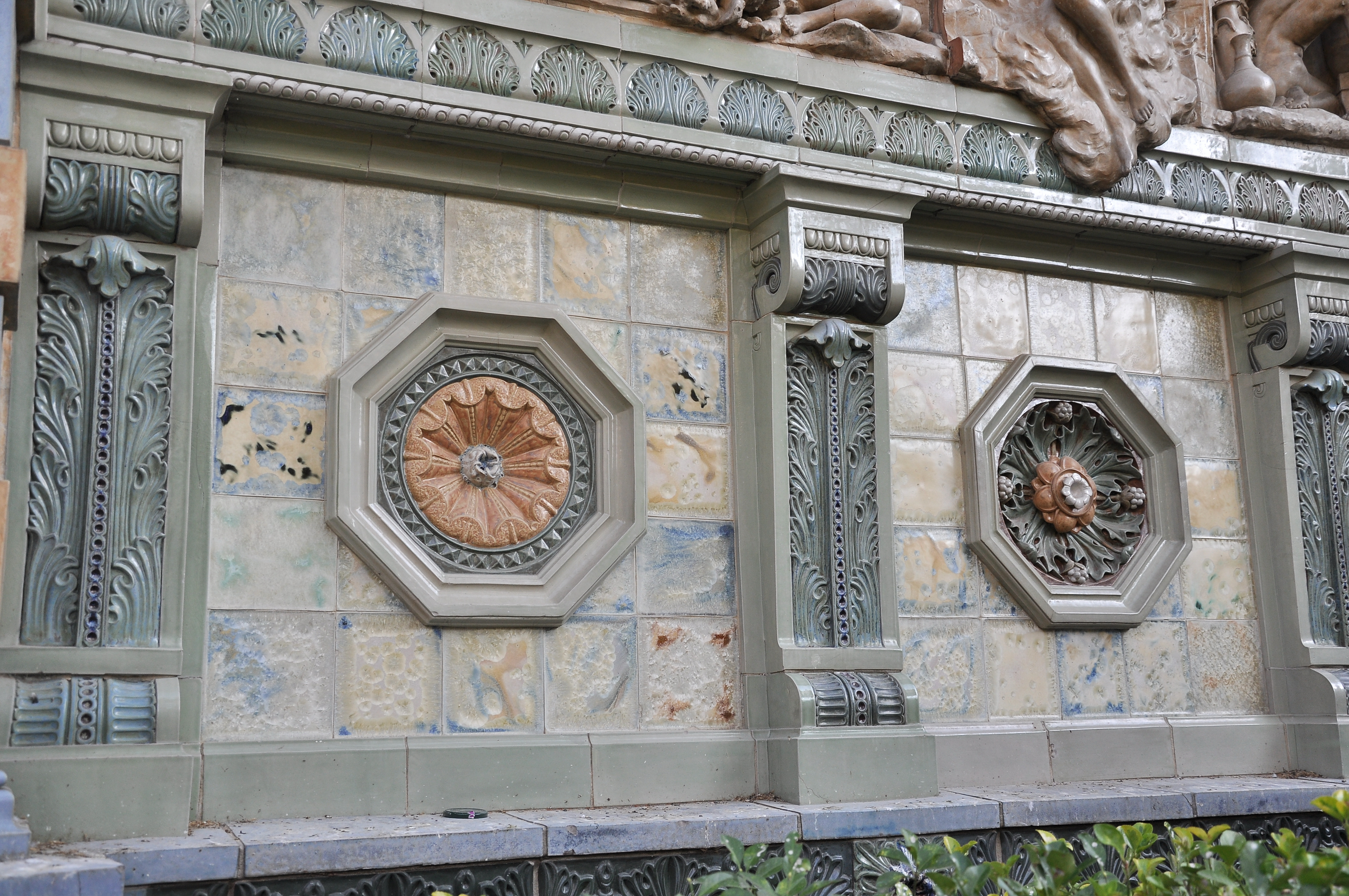
Art Nouveau corbels with Byzantine Revival acanthuses on the portico monumental Jules-Félix Coutan in the Félix-Desruelles Square, Paris, by Jules Coutan and the Sèvres Porcelain Manufactory, 1900

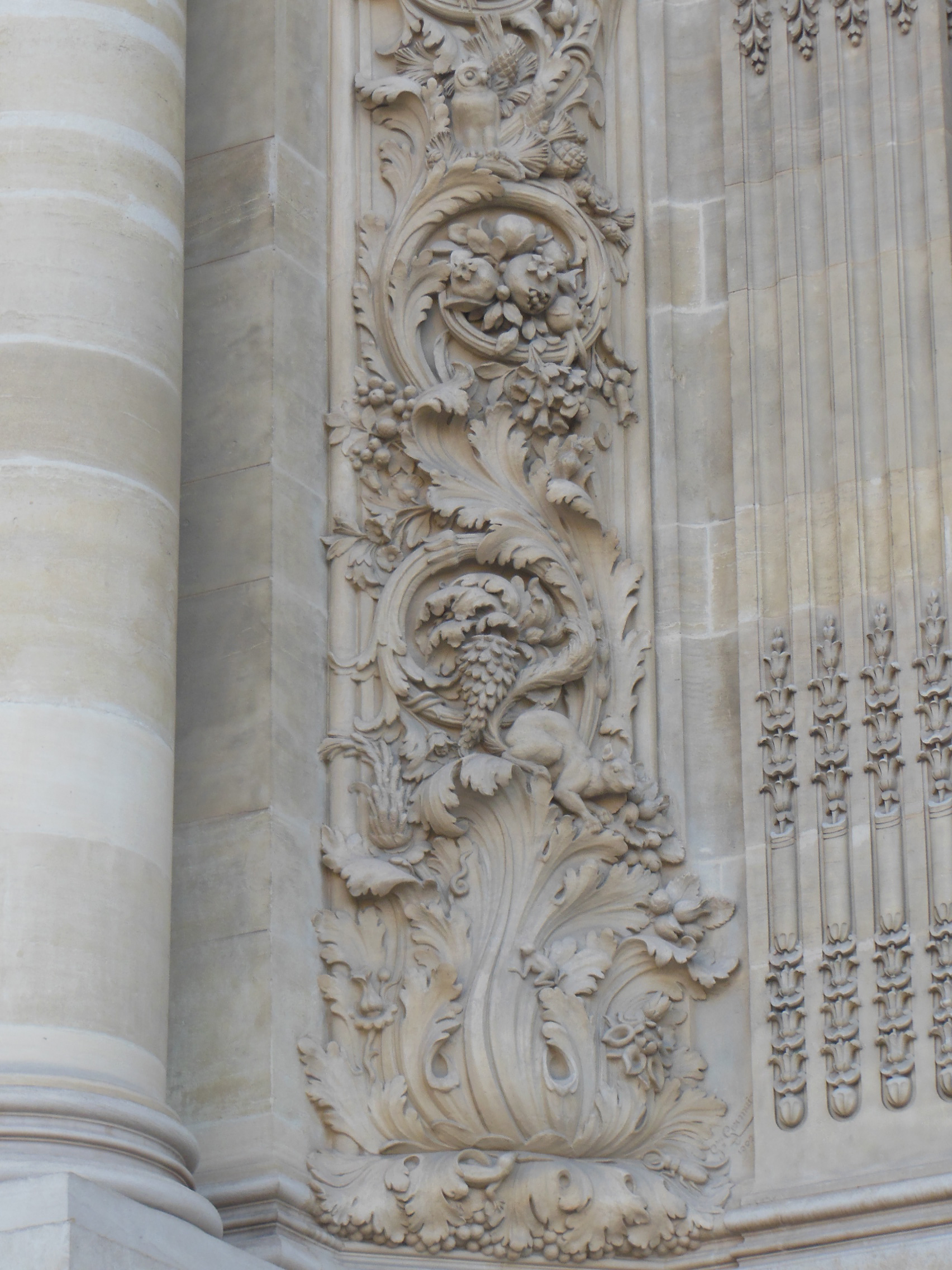
Beaux Arts acanthuses on the Petit Palais, Paris, by Charles Girault, 1900

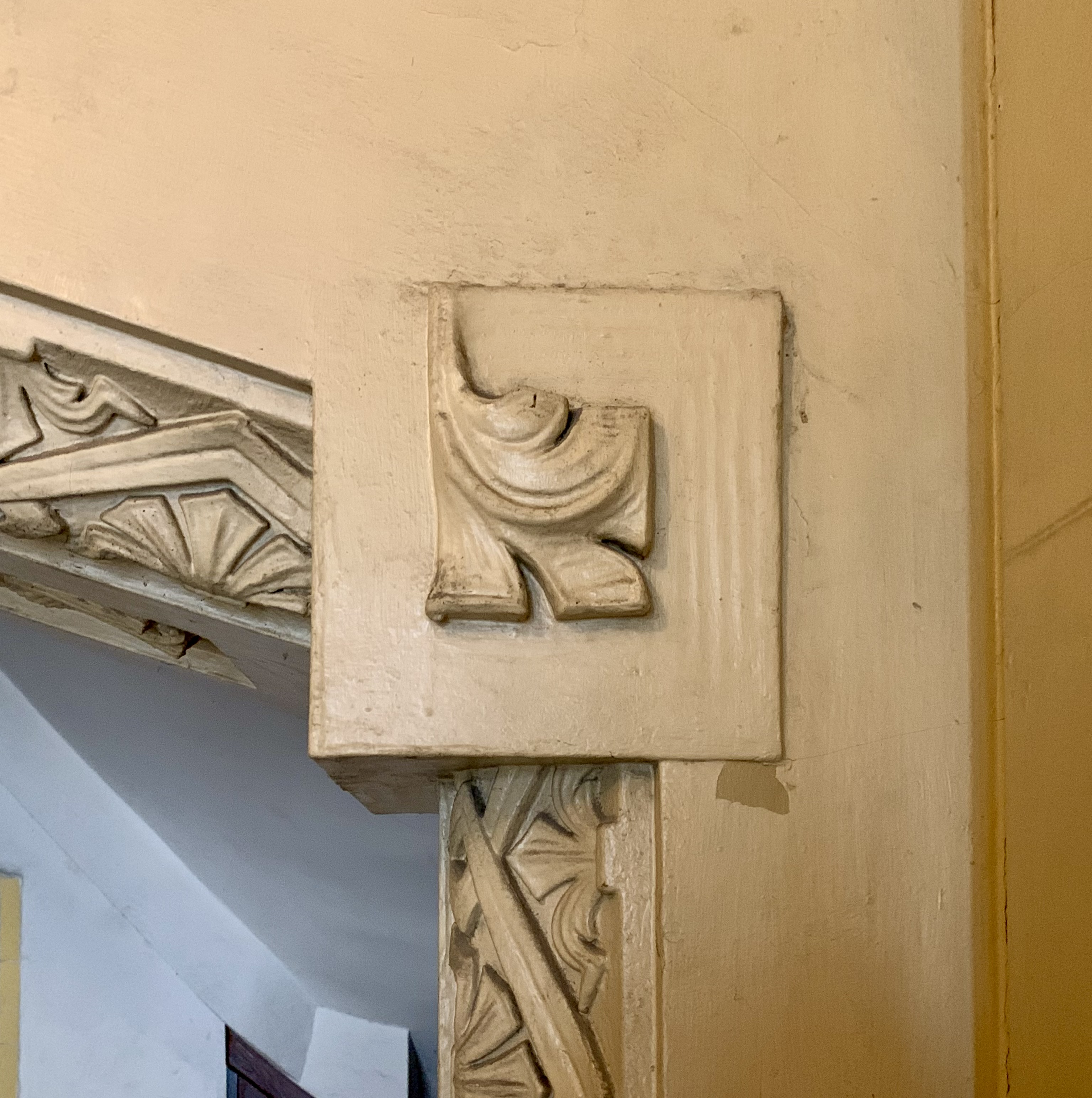
Art Deco acanthus in Strada Jules Michelet no. 15-17, Bucharest, by Victor Ștefănescu, c.1920

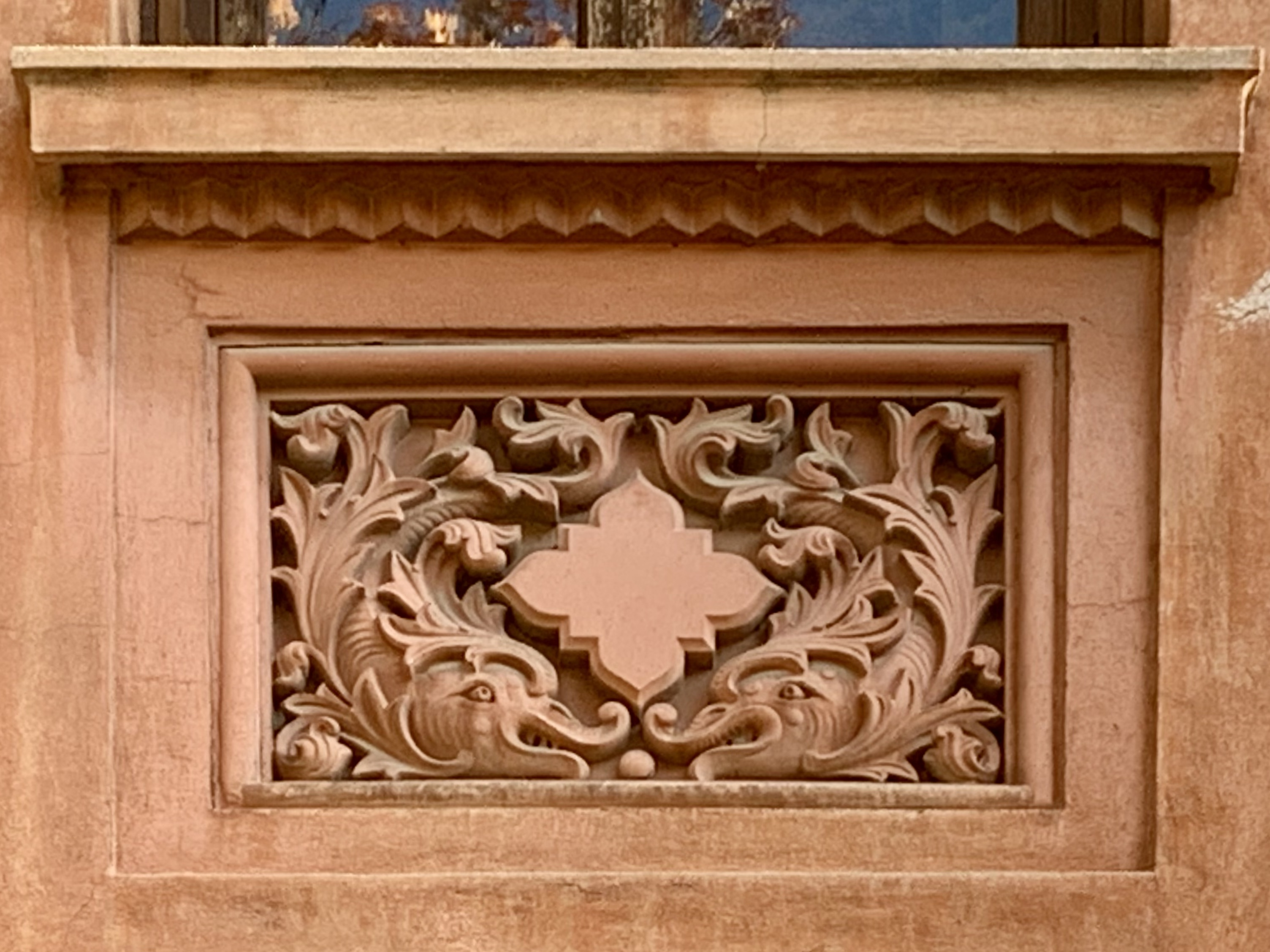
Romanian Revival acanthuses of fish in a relief of Strada Louis Pasteur no. 24, Bucharest, unknown architect, c.1930

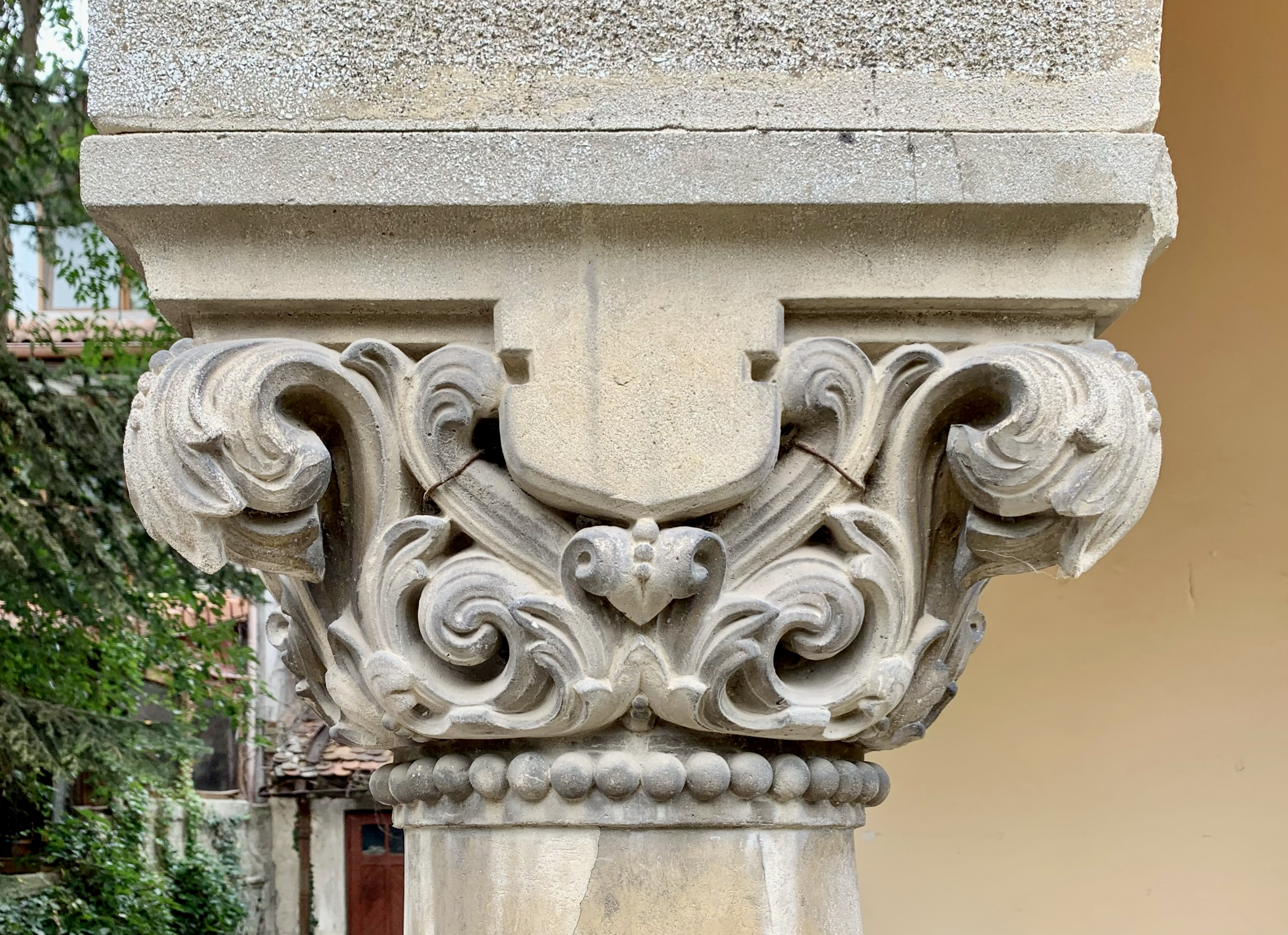
Romanian Revival capital with acanthuses of Strada Carol Davila no. 12, Bucharest, unknown architect, c.1930

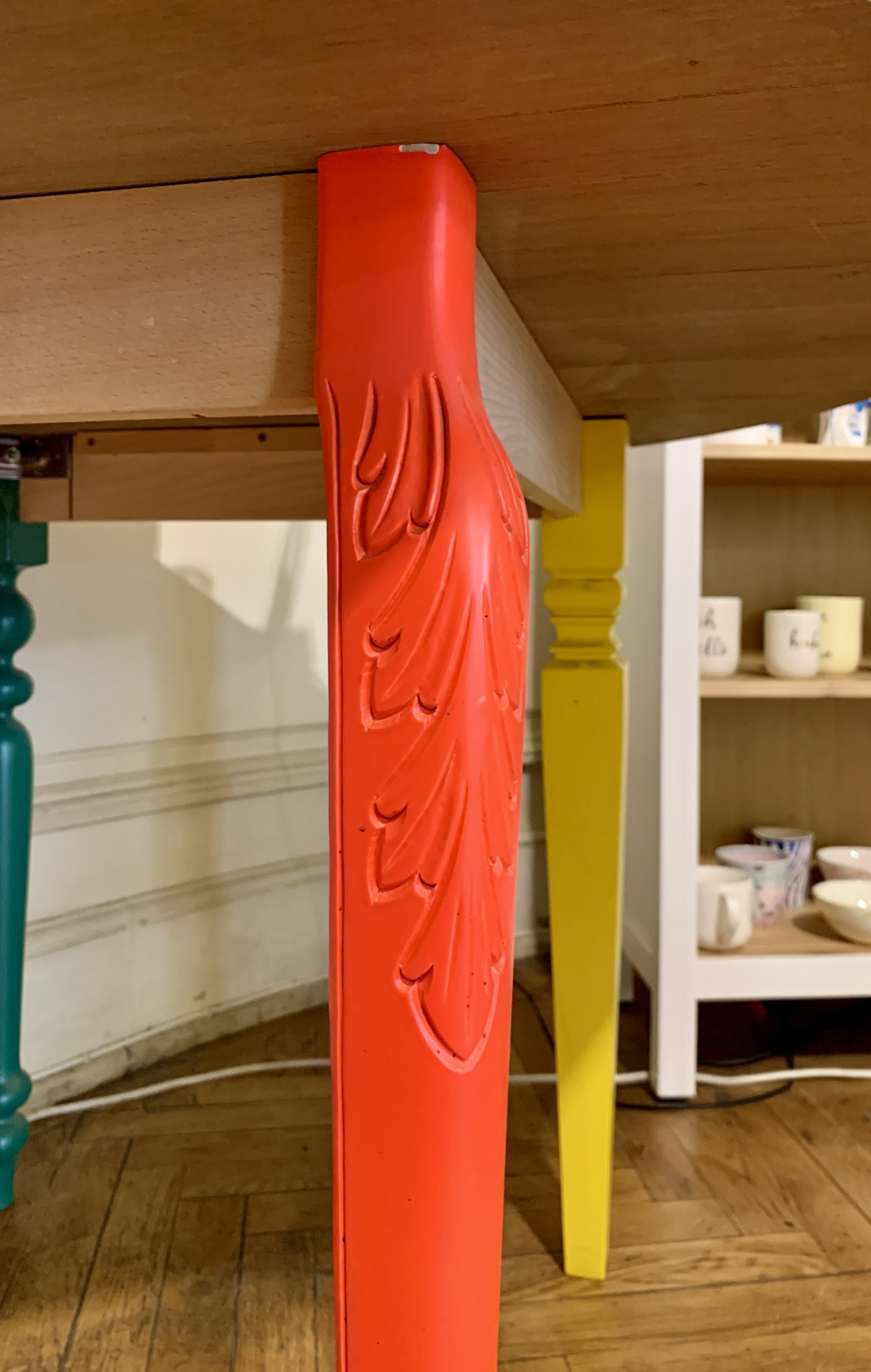
Postmodern acanthus leave on the leg of a table with different legs, unknown designer, c.2010, painted wood, Cărturești Verona (Strada Arthur Verona no. 15), Bucharest

== See also ==
- Arabesque (European art)
- Palmette
