= Acanthus guineensis =

Scientific classification
- Kingdom: Plantae
- Clade: Tracheophytes
- Clade: Angiosperms
- Clade: Eudicots
- Clade: Asterids
- Order: Lamiales
- Family: Acanthaceae
- Genus: Acanthus
- Species: A. guineensis

Binomial name
- Acanthus guineensis Heine & P. Taylor

Species of flowering plant

Acanthus guineensis is a species of flowering plant in the genus of Acanthus. It is native to Western Tropical Africa to Congo. This species grows primarily in wet tropical biomes.

== Description ==
It is a unbranched shrub growing up to 2 meters tall, commonly found in high-forest regions. It is similar in appearance to Acanthus montanus. The bracts have 5 to 9 spines, with two lateral spines forming the terminal pair. Bracteoles bear 1–2 spines and are up to 7 mm wide. Upper sepals measure 40–51 mm long and 9–12 mm wide, while lower sepals are 26–35 mm long. The corolla upper part is generally white, pale yellow, or occasionally pale pink, with yellow-green veins.

== Uses ==
In Sierra Leone, its boiled fruits are traditionally used to relieve children's coughs. Its flowers are also used for ornamental purposes.
