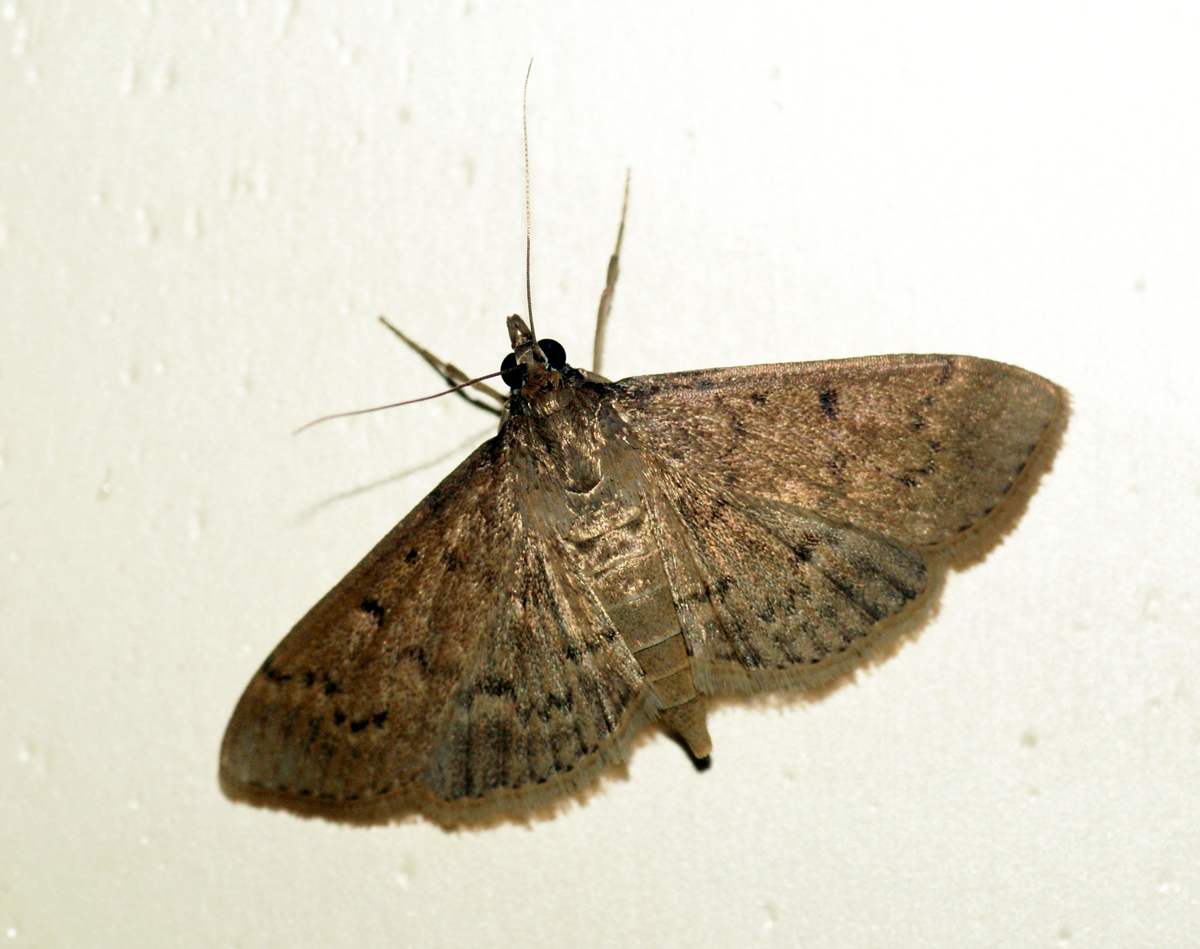

Scientific classification
- Domain: Eukaryota
- Kingdom: Animalia
- Phylum: Arthropoda
- Class: Insecta
- Order: Lepidoptera
- Family: Crambidae
- Genus: Herpetogramma
- Species: H. licarsisalis

Binomial name
- Herpetogramma licarsisalis (Walker, 1859)

Synonyms
- List: Botys licarsisalis Walker, 1859; Botys pharaxalis Walker, 1859; Botys immundalis Walker, 1866; Entephria fumidalis Walker, 1866; Botys serotinalis De Joannis, 1889; Botys abstrusalis Walker, 1859

= Herpetogramma licarsisalis =

Species of moth

Herpetogramma licarsisalis, commonly known as the grass webworm or pale sod-webworm, is a species of moth in the family Crambidae.

== Distribution and habitat ==
It is distributed in most of the Old World tropics, including South Africa, Zimbabwe, the Democratic Republic of the Congo, Togo, Sierra Leone, Sudan, Ethiopia, Egypt, Réunion, Madagascar, Saudi Arabia, the United Arab Emirates, Hong Kong, Malaysia, Borneo, the Philippines, New Caledonia, Australia, and New Zealand. It is an introduced species in many other parts of the world, including Hawaii, continental Spain and the Canary Islands, Portugal, Great Britain, Turkey, Cyprus, India and Sri Lanka.

== Lifecycle ==
The flat, elliptical eggs are deposited singly or in masses on the leaf blade's upper surface along the midrib. The caterpillars hatch after 4-6 days and undergo five instars in the following 14 days. First instar larvae are characterised by a black head capsule, whereas later instars have a brown head capsule. Mature larvae are green to brown, sometimes with a rose tint. Full-grown larvae are about 20 mm long. Pupation occurs in a loosely-woven hibernaculum and takes about 7.3 days. After eclosion from the pupa, the adult moths live for about 13 days. The moth's wingspan is about 24 mm. The species is strictly nocturnal, with all major developmental steps (mating, egg laying, hatching of the young larvae, larval feeding, moulting, pupation and eclosion) taking place at night.

== Behaviour and ecology ==
The species is a pest of turf and pastures in some parts of its distribution range. The larvae feed on various grasses of the family Poaceae such as Cenchrus clandestinus, Cynodon dactylon, Echinochloa crus-galli, Ischaemum, Lolium perenne, Oryza sativa, Panicum, Paspalum dilatatum, Pennisetum, Sorghum and Zea mays, as well as on Acanthus ebracteatus in the Acanthaceae, Gomphrena globosa in the Amaranthaceae, Nephelium lappaceum in the Sapindaceae, Senna siamea in the Fabaceae, and the king fern Angiopteris evecta in the Marattiaceae. The larvae live in a tube made of the leaves of their food plant lined with silk.
