= Adenosciadium =

Scientific classification
- Kingdom: Plantae
- Clade: Tracheophytes
- Clade: Angiosperms
- Clade: Eudicots
- Clade: Asterids
- Order: Apiales
- Family: Apiaceae
- Genus: Adenosciadium; H.Wolff
- Species: A. arabicum

Binomial name
- Adenosciadium arabicum (T.Anders.) H.Wolff

Synonyms
- Ammoides arabica (T.Anderson) M.Hiroe; Ptychotis arabica T.Anderson

Genus of flowering plants

Adenosciadium is a monotypic genus of flowering plant belonging to the parsley family, Apiaceae. The sole species Adenosciadium arabicum is endemic to Oman in the extreme southeast of the Arabian Peninsula.
