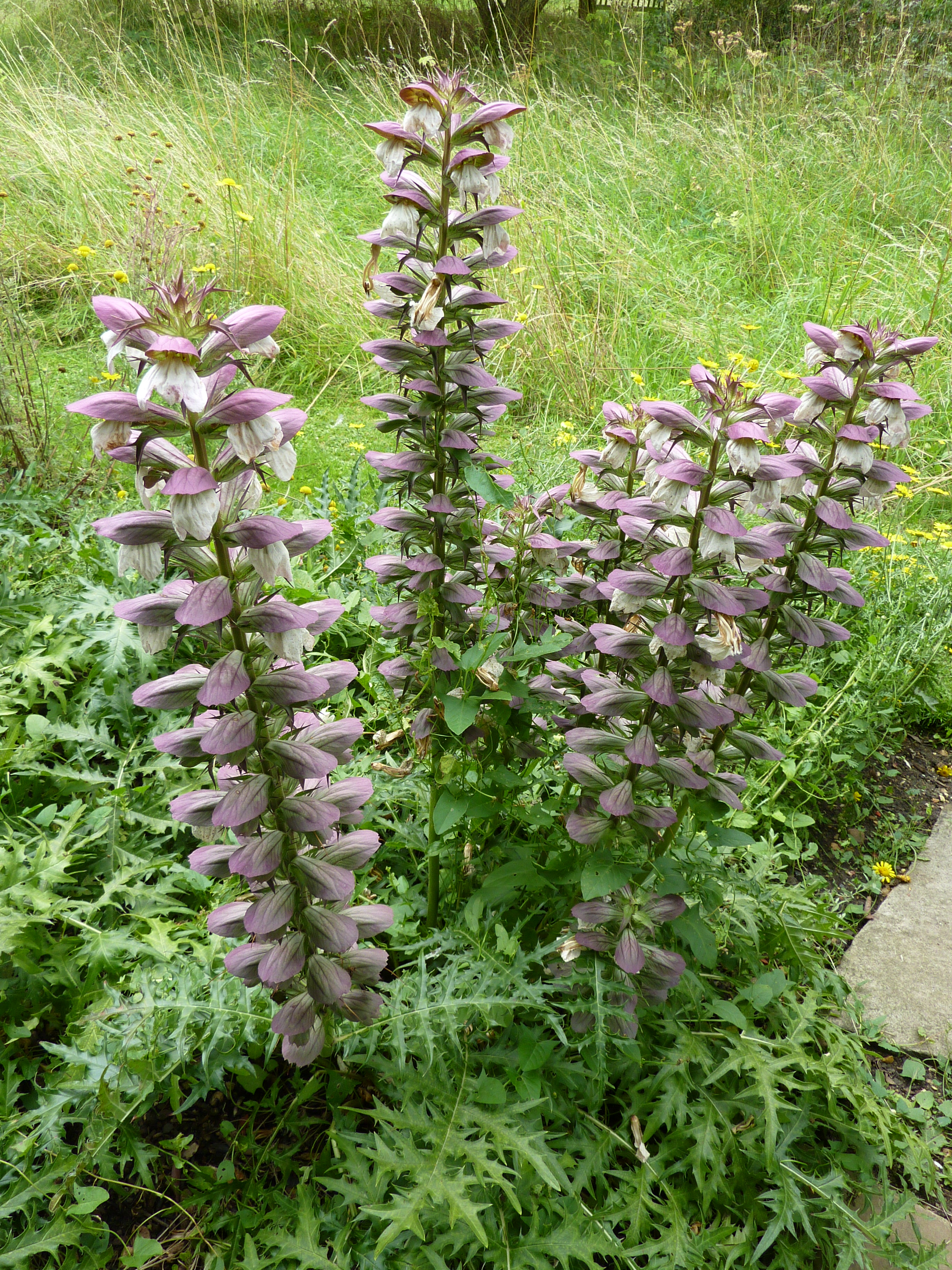
- A. spinosus, San Francisco Botanical Garden

Scientific classification
- Kingdom: Plantae
- Clade: Embryophytes
- Clade: Tracheophytes
- Clade: Angiosperms
- Clade: Eudicots
- Clade: Asterids
- Order: Lamiales
- Family: Acanthaceae
- Genus: Acanthus
- Species: A. spinosus

Binomial name
- Acanthus spinosus L.

= Acanthus spinosus =

Species of flowering plant

Acanthus spinosus, the spiny bear's breech, is a species of flowering plant in the family Acanthaceae, native to southern Europe, from Italy to western Turkey. It is an herbaceous perennial growing to 150 cm (59 in) tall by 60–90 cm (24–35 in) wide. The deeply cut leaves have spiny margins, and in early summer it bears erect, 1 m (3 ft) long racemes of white flowers with maroon bracts.

It is thought that both A. spinosus and close relative A. mollis were introduced to Britain from the Mediterranean by the Roman Empire. It has been intermittently cultivated ever since, and is now a regular feature of the herbaceous border. For centuries, stone or bronze stylized versions of acanthus leaves have appeared as decoration on certain styles of architecture and furniture.

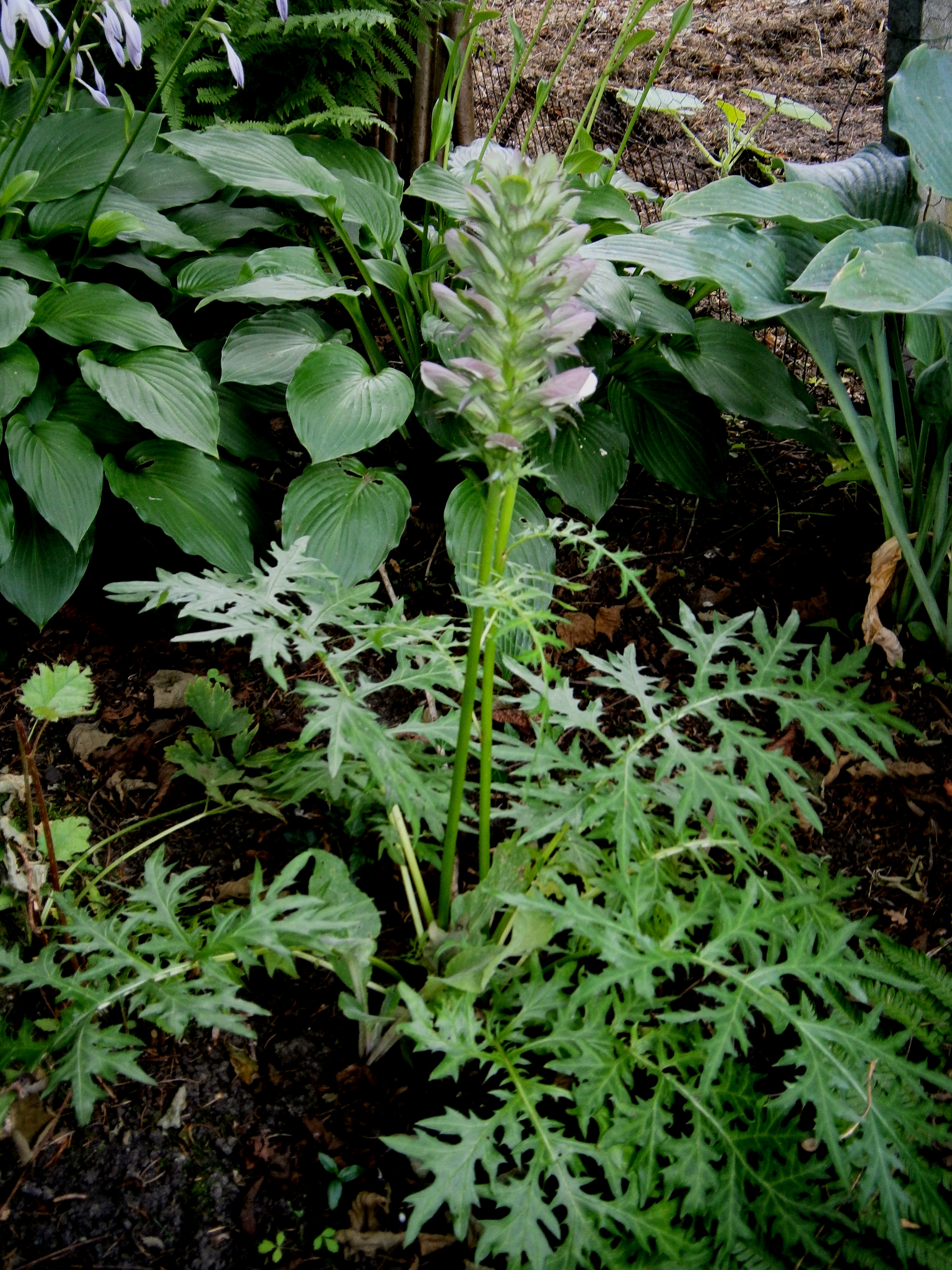
Young plant

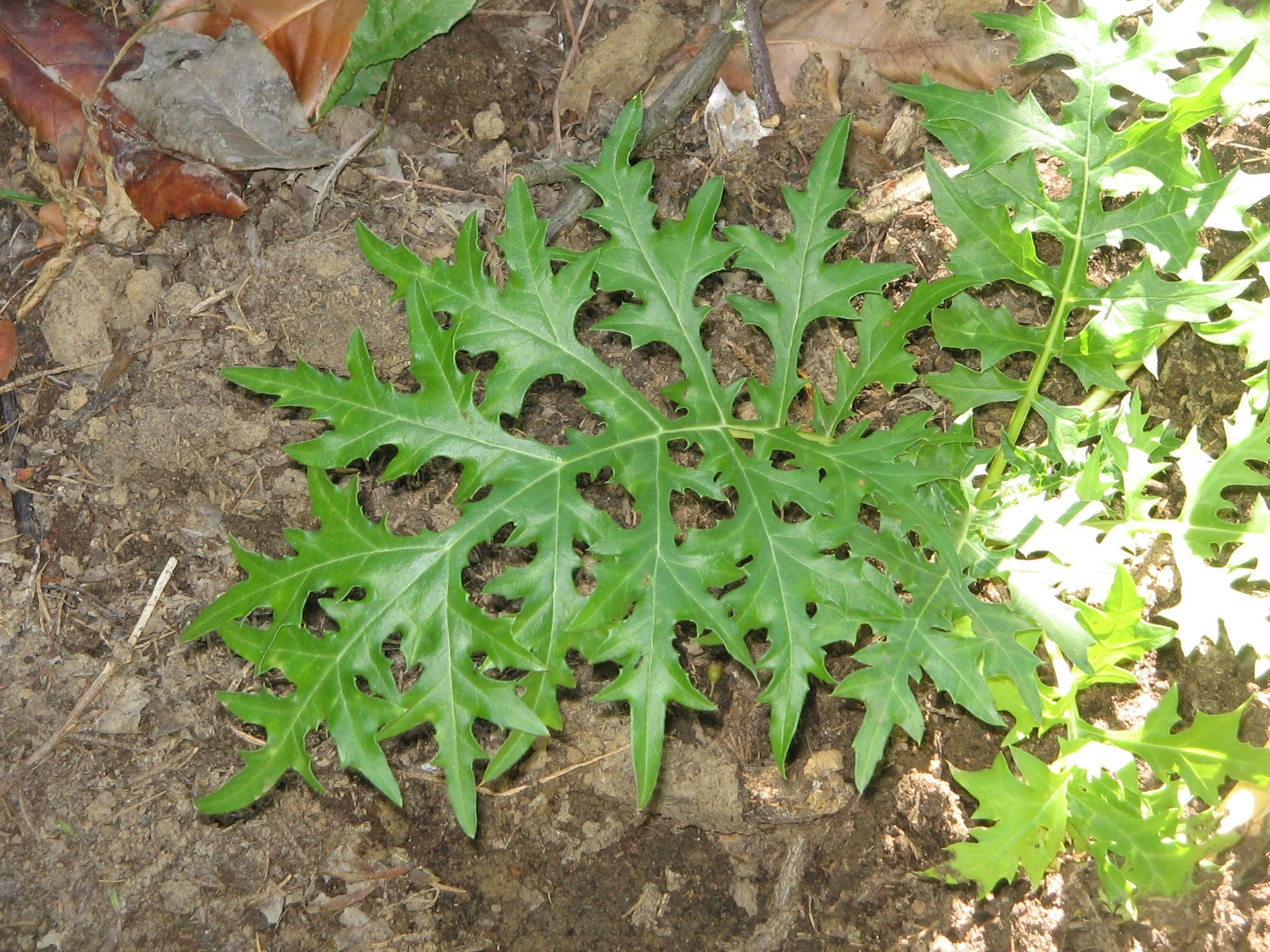
Leaf
