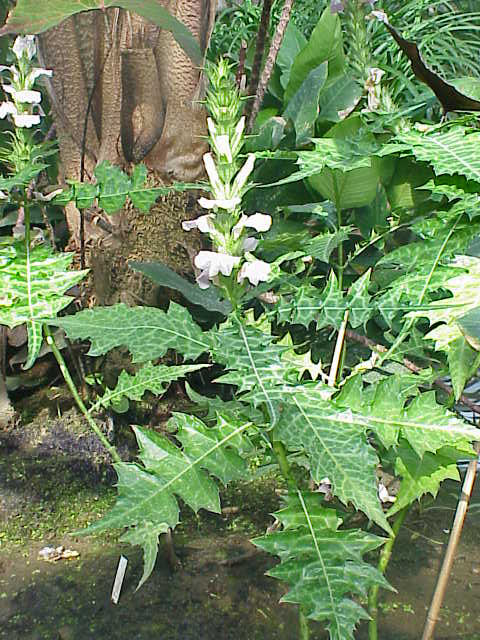
- Acanthus montanus

Scientific classification
- Kingdom: Plantae
- Clade: Embryophytes
- Clade: Tracheophytes
- Clade: Angiosperms
- Clade: Eudicots
- Clade: Asterids
- Order: Lamiales
- Family: Acanthaceae
- Subfamily: Acanthoideae
- Tribe: Acantheae
- Genus: Acanthus; L. (1753)

Species
- See text

Synonyms
- Acanthodus Raf. (1814); Cheilopsis Moq. (1832); Dilicaria T.Anderson (1863), orth. var.; Dilivaria Juss. (1789); Zonablephis Raf. (1838)

= Acanthus (plant) =

Genus of flowering plants

Acanthus is a genus of about 30 species of flowering plants in the family Acanthaceae, native to tropical and warm temperate regions, with the highest species diversity in the Mediterranean Basin and Asia. This flowering plant is nectar-producing and depends on butterflies, such as Anartia fatima, and other nectar-feeding organisms to distribute its pollen. Common names include acanthus and bear's breeches. The genus name derives from Ancient Greek ἄκανθος (ákanthos) for Acanthus mollis, a plant that was commonly imitated in Corinthian capitals.

The genus comprises herbaceous perennial plants, rarely subshrubs, with spiny leaves and flower spikes bearing white or purplish flowers. Size varies from 0.4 to 2 m (1.3 to 6.6 ft) in height.

== Species ==
29 species are accepted:

- Acanthus albus Debnath, B.K.Singh & P.Giri
- Acanthus arboreus Forssk. (1775)
- Acanthus austromontanus Vollesen – This species is native to southwestern Tanzania
- Acanthus carduaceus Griff.
- Acanthus caroli-alexandri Hausskn. (Syn. Acanthus greuterianus Snogerup, B.Snogerup & Strid (2006)) – This species was discovered in NW Greece.
- Acanthus caudatus Lindau
- Acanthus dioscoridis Willd.
- Acanthus ebracteatus Vahl – This species occurs in South Asia, including Brunei Darussalam, China, South Taiwan, India, Malaysia, Philippines, Singapore, Thailand, Viet Nam, Cambodia, and Indonesia. In Australasia it is found in northeast Australia, northwest Australia, Papua New Guinea, and the Solomon Islands.
- Acanthus eminens C.B.Clarke – native to tropical Africa
- Acanthus flexicaulis Bremek.
- Acanthus gaed Lindau
- Acanthus guineensis Heine & P.Taylor
- Acanthus hirsutus Boiss. – native to Turkey, Syria
  - Acanthus hirsutus subsp. syriacus (Syn. Acanthus syriacus Boiss.) – native to the Eastern Mediterranean region
- Acanthus hungaricus (Borbás) Baen. (Syn. Acanthus balcanicus Heywood & I.Richardson, Acanthus longifolius Host) – native to the Balkans south of Dalmatia
- Acanthus ilicifolius L. – native to India and Sri Lanka
- Acanthus kulalensis Vollesen
- Acanthus latisepalus C.B. Clarke (1899)
- Acanthus leucostachyus Wall. ex Nees. (1832)
- Acanthus longibracteatus Kurz (1870)
- Acanthus mayaccanus Büttner (1890)
- Acanthus mollis L. – native to Mediterranean Europe
- Acanthus montanus (Nees) T.Anders. – West and Central African species, from Ghana in the west to Angola and the Democratic Republic of Congo.
- Acanthus pubescens Thomson ex Oliv.
- Acanthus polystachyus Delile – native to Burundi, Rwanda, DRC, Uganda, Sudan, Ethiopia, Kenya, Tanzania.
- Acanthus sennii Chiov.
- Acanthus seretii De Wild.
- Acanthus spinosus L. – native to southern Europe
- Acanthus uleensis De Wild. – native to Central (primarily DR Congo and Republic of the Congo) and East Africa (primarily Tanzania)
- Acanthus villaeanus De Wild.
- Acanthus volubilis Wall.

== Cultivation and uses ==
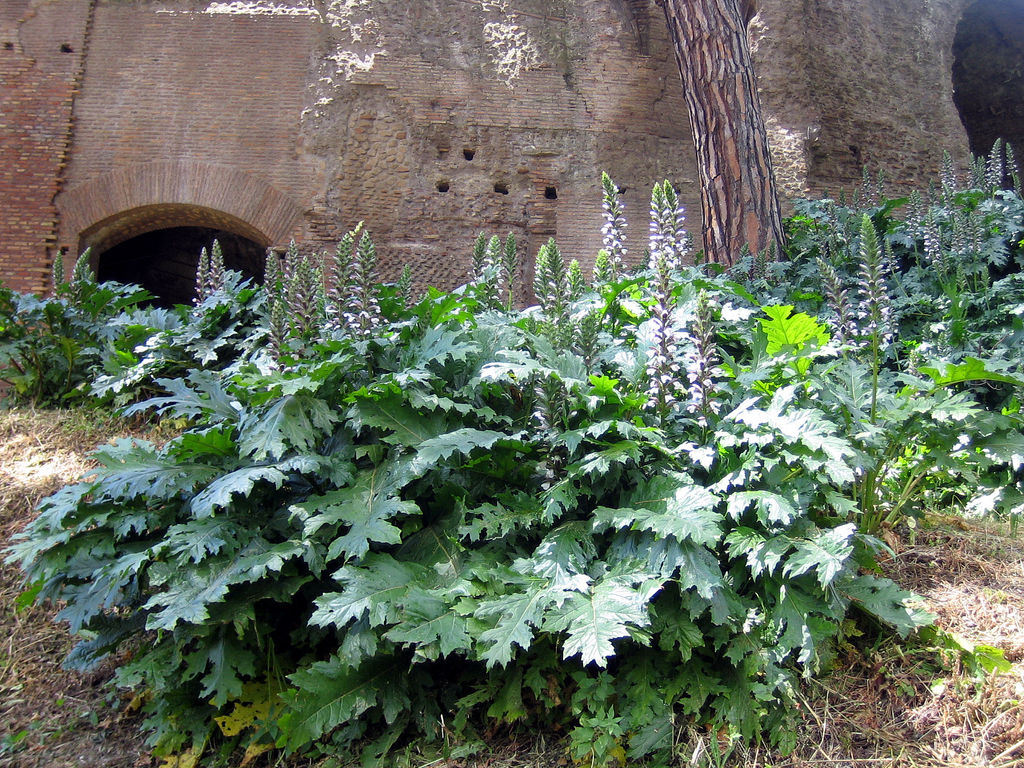
An acanthus (A. mollis) flowering in the ruins of the Palatine Hill, Rome, May 2005

Acanthus leaves were the aesthetic basis for capitals in the Corinthian order of architecture; Several species, especially A. balcanicus, A. spinosus and A. mollis, are grown as ornamental plants.

Acanthus leaves also have many medicinal uses. Acanthus ilicifolius, whose chemical composition has been heavily researched, is widely used in ethnopharmaceutical applications, including in Indian and Chinese traditional medicine. Various parts of Acanthus ilicifolius have been used to treat asthma, diabetes, leprosy, hepatitis, snake bites, and rheumatoid arthritis. The leaves of Acanthus ebracteatus, noted for their antioxidant properties, are used for making herbal tea in Thailand and Indonesia.
