= Acanthus austromontanus =

Conservation status
- Endangered (IUCN 3.1)

Scientific classification
- Kingdom: Plantae
- Clade: Tracheophytes
- Clade: Angiosperms
- Clade: Eudicots
- Clade: Asterids
- Order: Lamiales
- Family: Acanthaceae
- Genus: Acanthus
- Species: A. austromontanus

Binomial name
- Acanthus austromontanus Vollesen

Species of flowering plant

Acanthus austromontanus is a species of flowering plant in the genus of Acanthus. It is native to southwestern Tanzania and typically exists as a shrub.

== Description ==
It measures 3–4 metres (9.8–13.1 ft) in height, with young, slightly hairy stems. Its elliptic leaves are up to 19 cm (7.5 in) long and have spiny edges along with an acute, spine-tipped apex. The undersides are sparsely hairy with glossy veins, while the tops are mostly smooth. Flower clusters (cymes) grow up to 20 cm (7.9 in), with purple-tinted bracts lined with teeth.
