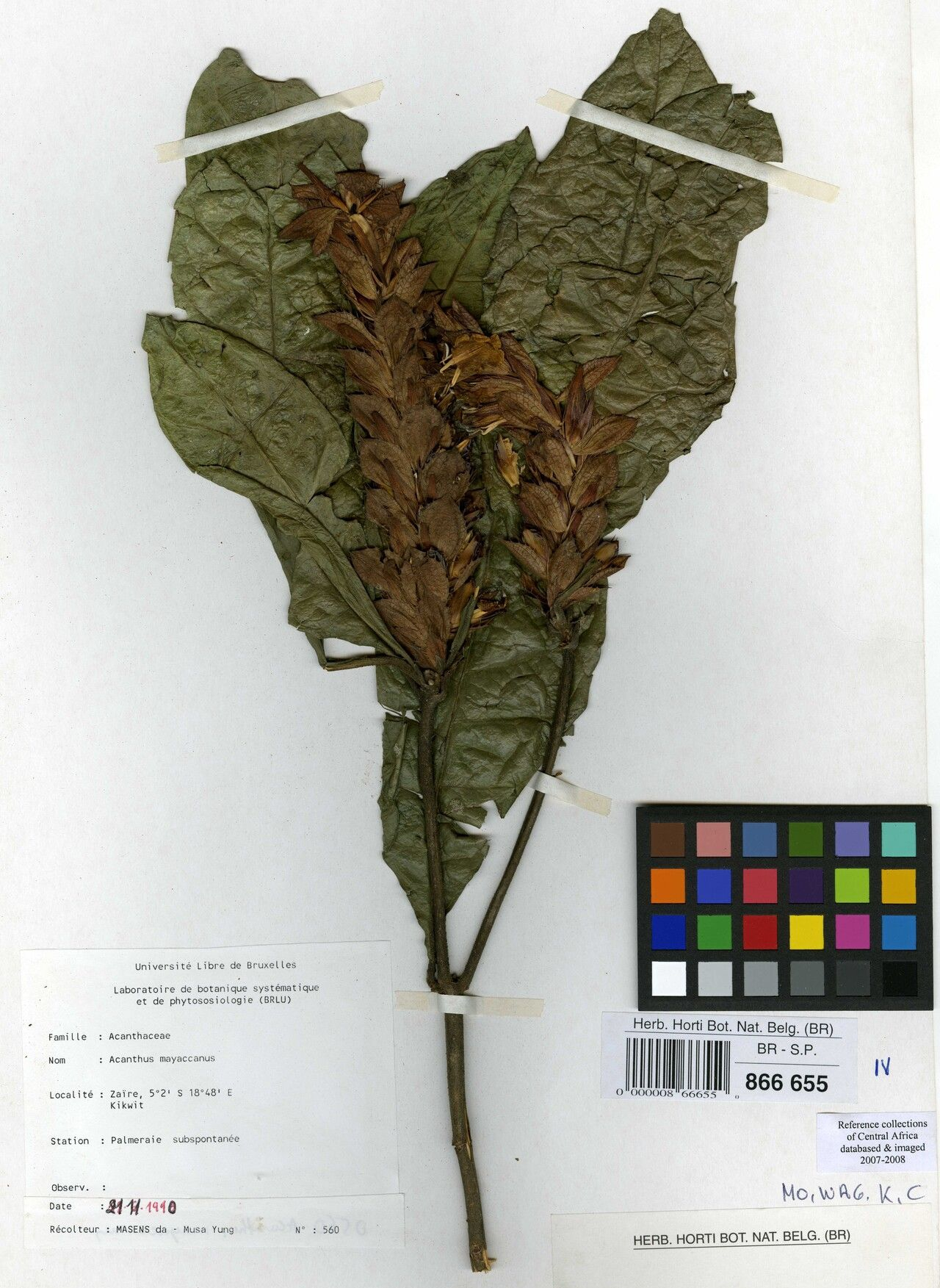
- Specimen of Acanthus mayaccanus

Scientific classification
- Kingdom: Plantae
- Clade: Tracheophytes
- Clade: Angiosperms
- Clade: Eudicots
- Clade: Asterids
- Order: Lamiales
- Family: Acanthaceae
- Genus: Acanthus
- Species: A. mayaccanus

Binomial name
- Acanthus mayaccanus Büttner

= Acanthus mayaccanus =

Species of flowering plant

Acanthus mayaccanus is a shrub species in the family Acanthaceae. It is endemic to the Republic of the Congo.

== Description ==
Acanthus mayaccanus is a perennial shrub characterized by spiny leaves and showy inflorescences typical of the genus Acanthus. Like other members of the family Acanthaceae, it produces tubular flowers and broad, lobed foliage.

== Taxonomy ==
The species was formally described by Büttner in 1890. It was first published in Verhandlungen des Botanischen Vereins der Provinz Brandenburg 32: 37 (1890). The accepted scientific name is Acanthus mayaccanus Büttner, as recognized by major global plant taxonomic databases.

== Distribution and habitat ==
The species is native to West-Central Tropical Africa, primarily in the Congo region. It is endemic to the Republic of the Congo, where it occurs in tropical lowland forests characterized by consistently warm temperatures. The species primarily inhabits wet tropical biomes and grows in moist, shaded environments, typically as part of the forest understory vegetation.

== Conservation ==
According to the Angiosperm Extinction Risk Predictions (AERP), the species is predicted to be threatened, with a confident level of certainty.
