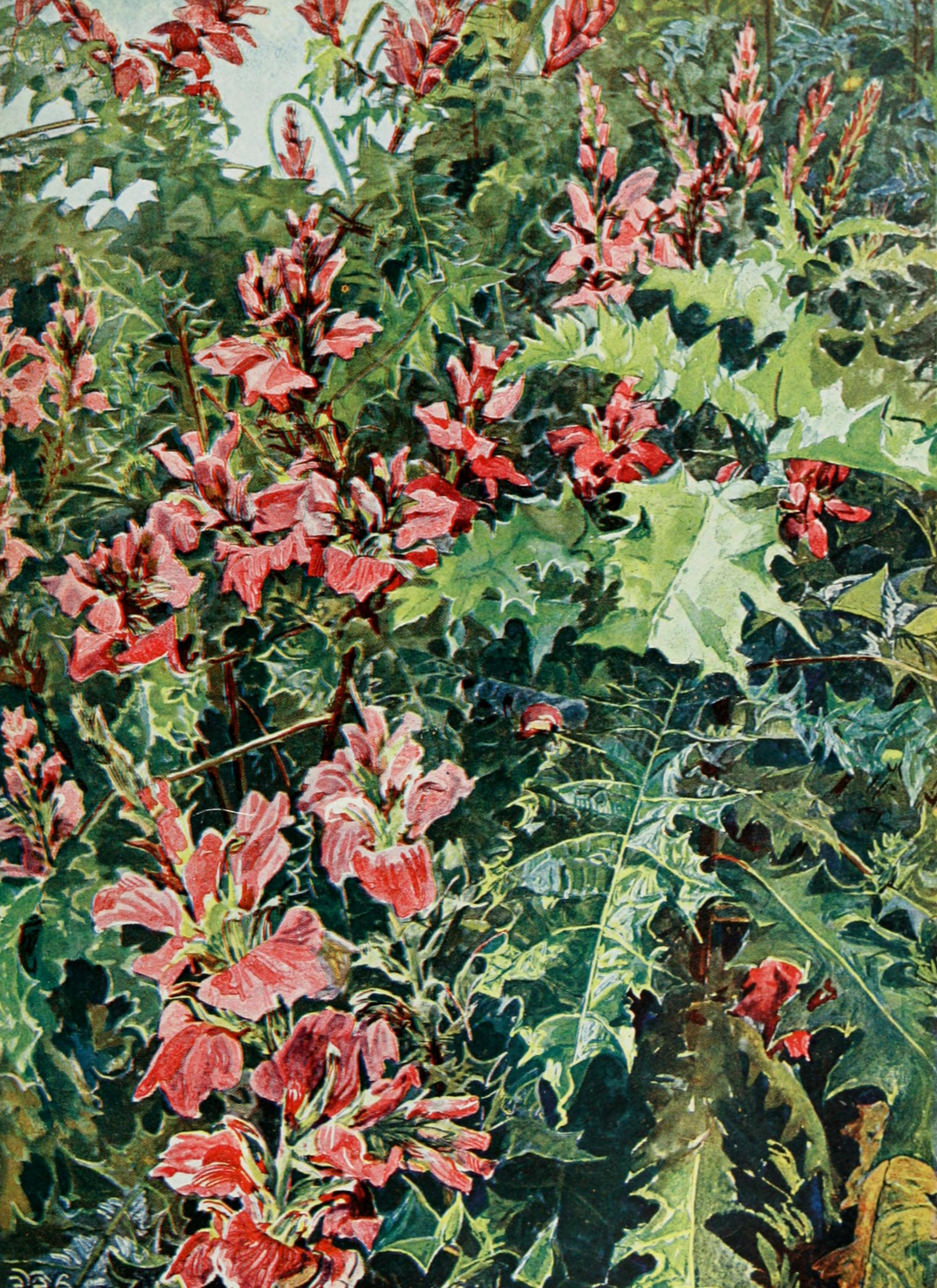

Scientific classification
- Kingdom: Plantae
- Clade: Tracheophytes
- Clade: Angiosperms
- Clade: Eudicots
- Clade: Asterids
- Order: Lamiales
- Family: Acanthaceae
- Genus: Acanthus
- Species: A. arboreus

Binomial name
- Acanthus arboreus Forssk. (1775)

= Acanthus arboreus =

Species of flowering plant

Acanthus arboreus is a species of flowering plant in the genus of Acanthus. It is native to wetland of Ethiopia and exists as a shrub.

== Description ==
Acanthus arboreus grows best in well-draining soil under full sun to partial shade and is adaptable to cooler climates, enduring temperatures as low as −5 °C. The plant features spoon-shaped, spiny-edged green leaves and produces pink flowers on tall stems during summer. It can reach heights of 4 to 19 feet and is known for its drought tolerance. It grows well on steep grassy hills, especially on the western slopes at heights between 1,000 and 3,000 meters.
