= Acanthus flexicaulis =

Scientific classification
- Kingdom: Plantae
- Clade: Tracheophytes
- Clade: Angiosperms
- Clade: Eudicots
- Clade: Asterids
- Order: Lamiales
- Family: Acanthaceae
- Genus: Acanthus
- Species: A. flexicaulis

Binomial name
- Acanthus flexicaulis Bremek. 1955

Species of flowering plant

Acanthus flexicaulis is a species of flowering plant in the genus of Acanthus. It is native to Peninsular Malaysia and Sumatra. It was first described by Dutch botanist, Cornelis Eliza Bertus Bremekamp in 1955. (Note: The discovery of Anthacus flexicaulis by Dutch botanist Cornelis Eliza Bertus Bremekamp was published in 1955 in the journal Proceedings of the Koninklijke Nederlandse Akademie van Wetenschappen. This scholarly journal is published by the Royal Netherlands Academy of Arts and Sciences.)

== Description ==
Acanthus flexicaulis is a shrub and grows in wet tropical biomes. It lacks bracteoles and has small flowers.
