= Acanthus kulalensis =

Conservation status
- Vulnerable (IUCN 3.1)

Scientific classification
- Kingdom: Plantae
- Clade: Tracheophytes
- Clade: Angiosperms
- Clade: Eudicots
- Clade: Asterids
- Order: Lamiales
- Family: Acanthaceae
- Genus: Acanthus
- Species: A. kulalensis

Binomial name
- Acanthus kulalensis Vollesen

Species of plant

Acanthus kulalensis is a species of flowering plant in the genus of Acanthus. It is native to North Kenya and grows primarily in seasonal dry tropical biome.

== Description ==
This shrub grows up to 2.5 m (8 ft) tall, has stems and deeply lobed, spine-tipped leaves 10 cm–17 cm × 4 cm–7.5 cm (3.9 in–6.7 in × 1.6 in–3.0 in). Its inflorescences are 3–14 cm (1.2–5.5 in) long cymes with densely hairy, spine-tipped bracts. Flowers have a green calyx with purple tips, a white corolla tube with a pinkish-mauve limb 3.5–5 cm (1.4–2.0 in), and filaments up to 2 cm (0.79 in) long. It grows in dry montane forest glades at 1,950–2,100 m (6,400–6,890 ft). A closely related species is Acanthus polystachius, which can be distinguished by several key morphological features. It has a much longer and silkier covering of hairs (indumentum) on the bracts and calyx than A. polystachius. Its bracts and sepal are longer than those found in A. polystachius. Another distinguishing feature is the thickened rim of the corolla, which is absent or less developed in A. polystachius.
