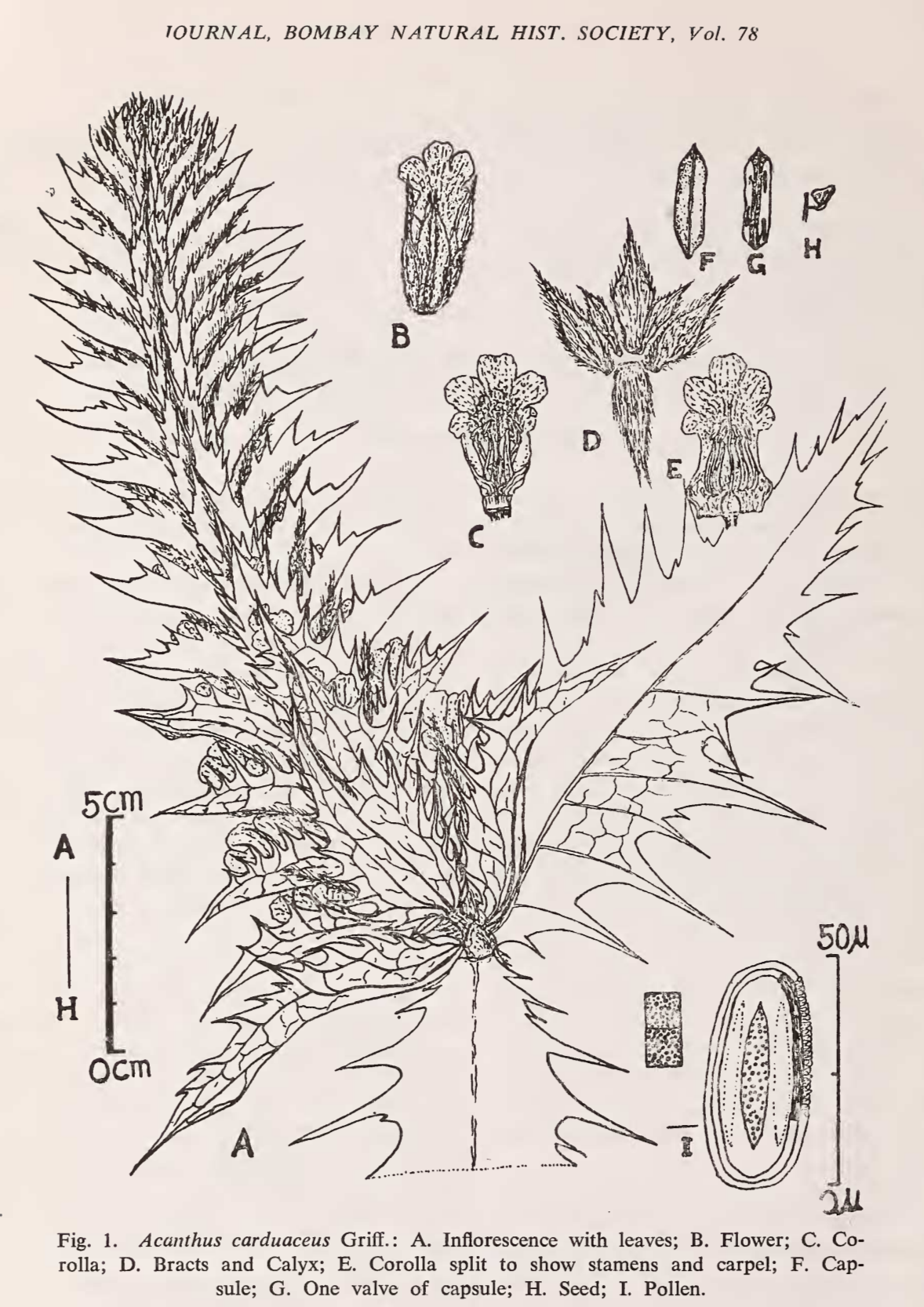

Scientific classification
- Kingdom: Plantae
- Clade: Tracheophytes
- Clade: Angiosperms
- Clade: Eudicots
- Clade: Asterids
- Order: Lamiales
- Family: Acanthaceae
- Genus: Acanthus
- Species: A. carduaceus

Binomial name
- Acanthus carduaceus Griff.

= Acanthus carduaceus =

Species of flowering plant

Acanthus carduaceus is a species of flowering plant in the genus of Acanthus. It is native to Eastern Himalayas and exists as a shrub. It is also found in limited parts of Bengal and Assam.

== Description ==
Acanthus carduaceus is a robust, scandent shrub, reaching up to 2.5 m in height. It features large pinnatifid leaves with spinous lobes and compact terminal racemes as inflorescences. The white flowers are tubular, with a heteromorphic calyx and a 5-lobed corolla.
