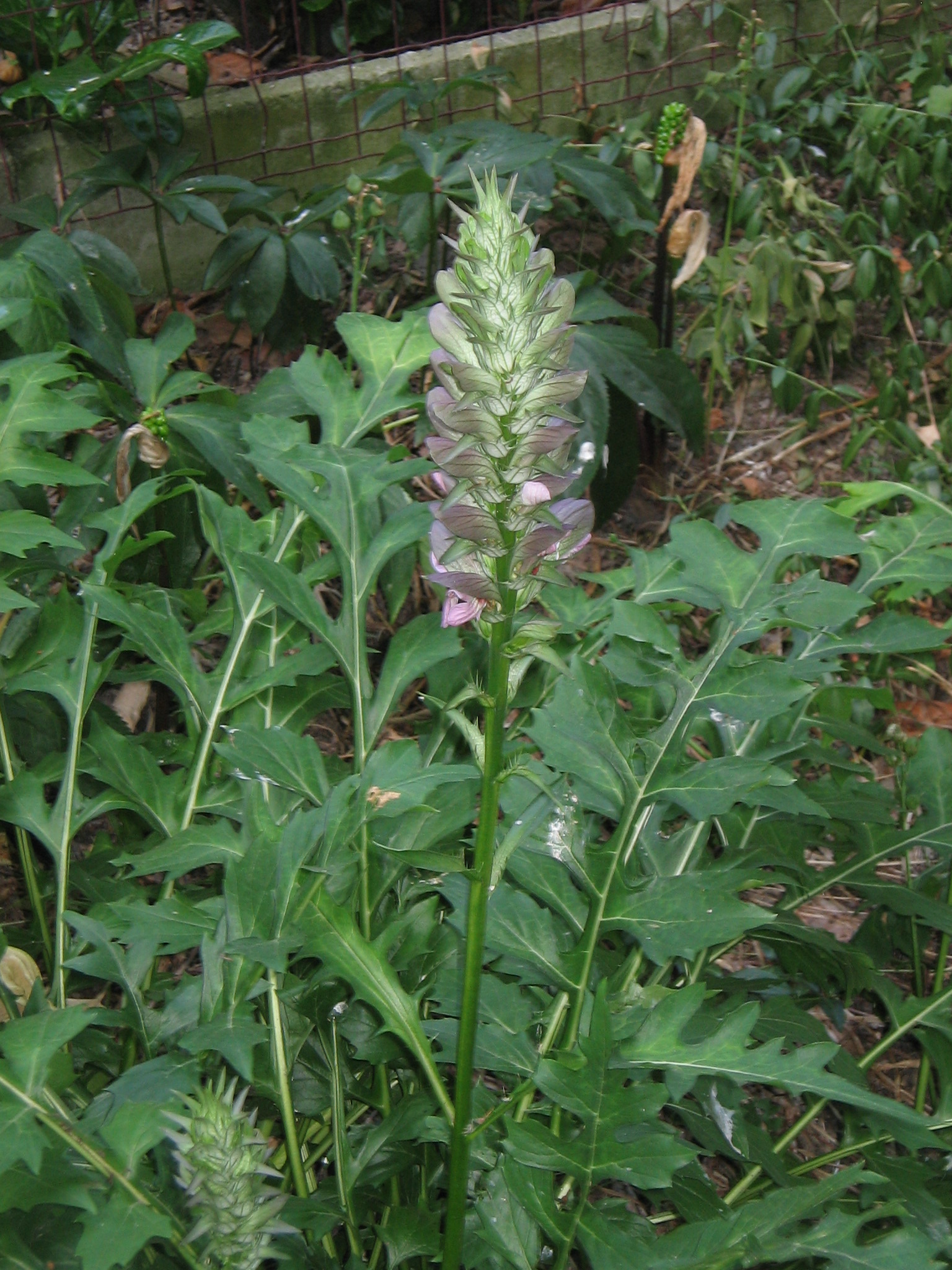

Scientific classification
- Kingdom: Plantae
- Clade: Tracheophytes
- Clade: Angiosperms
- Clade: Eudicots
- Clade: Asterids
- Order: Lamiales
- Family: Acanthaceae
- Genus: Acanthus
- Species: A. hungaricus

Binomial name
- Acanthus hungaricus (Borbás) Baen. (1896)

Synonyms
- Acanthus balcanicus Heywood & I.Richardson (1972); Acanthus longifolius var. hungaricus Borbás (1893); Acanthus longifolius Host (1831), nom. illeg.

= Acanthus hungaricus =

Species of flowering plant

Acanthus hungaricus, is a herbaceous perennial plant in the genus Acanthus, native to the Balkan peninsula, including Albania, Bulgaria, Greece, Romania, European Turkey, and the former Yugoslavia. This plant is also cultivated in many European and American gardens.

It grows to 80 cm tall, with basal clusters of deeply lobed and cut leaves. Leaves are dark green and shiny. It flowers in mid summer from July to August. Flowers are on a very long flowering stem and consist of a lower lip and upper tooth-like lip.

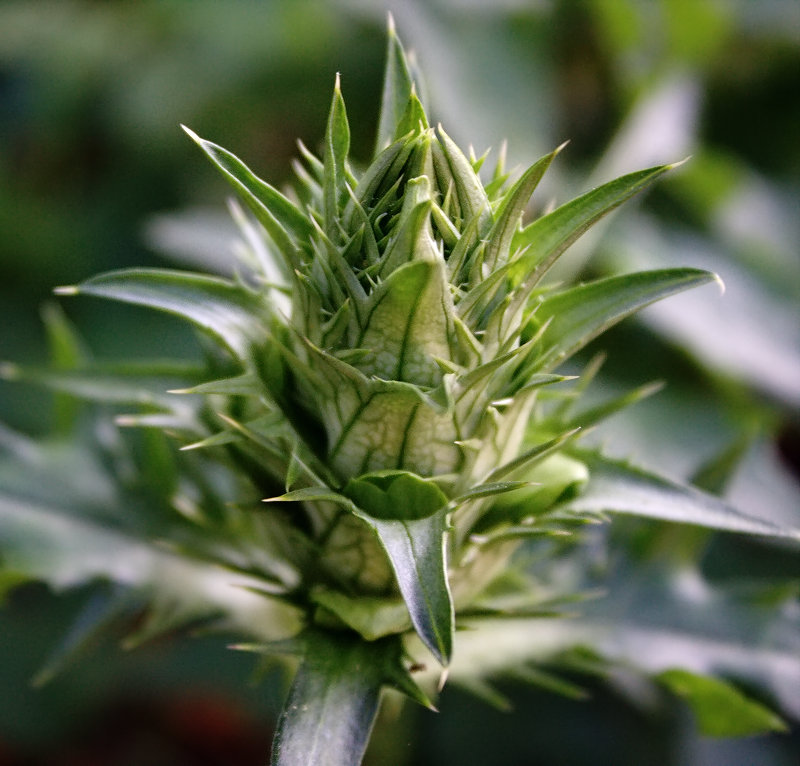
Inflorescence bud

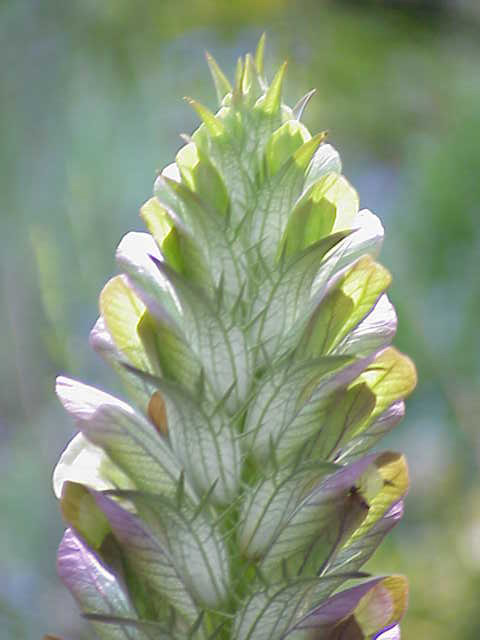
Opening inflorescence

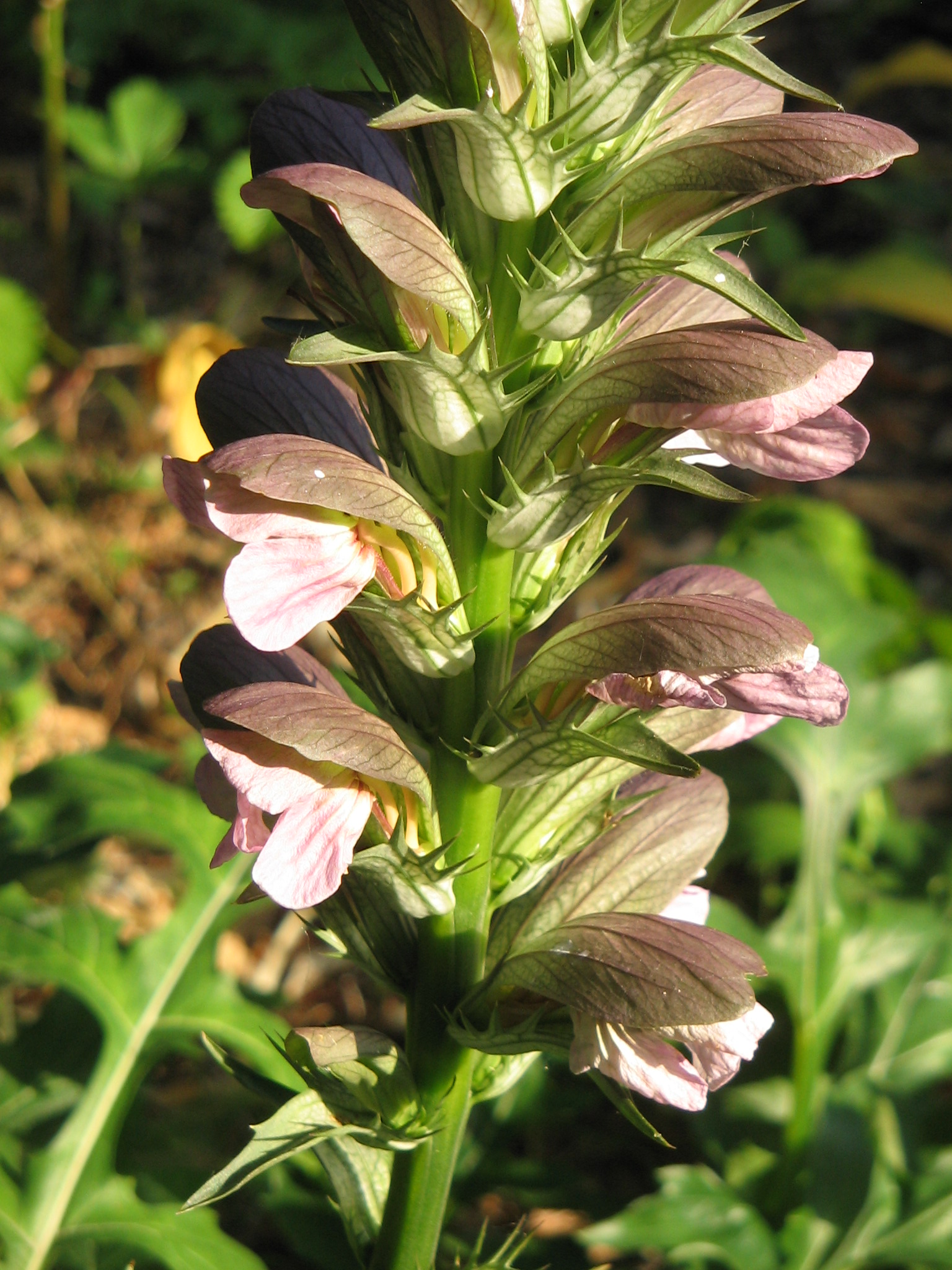
Inflorescence

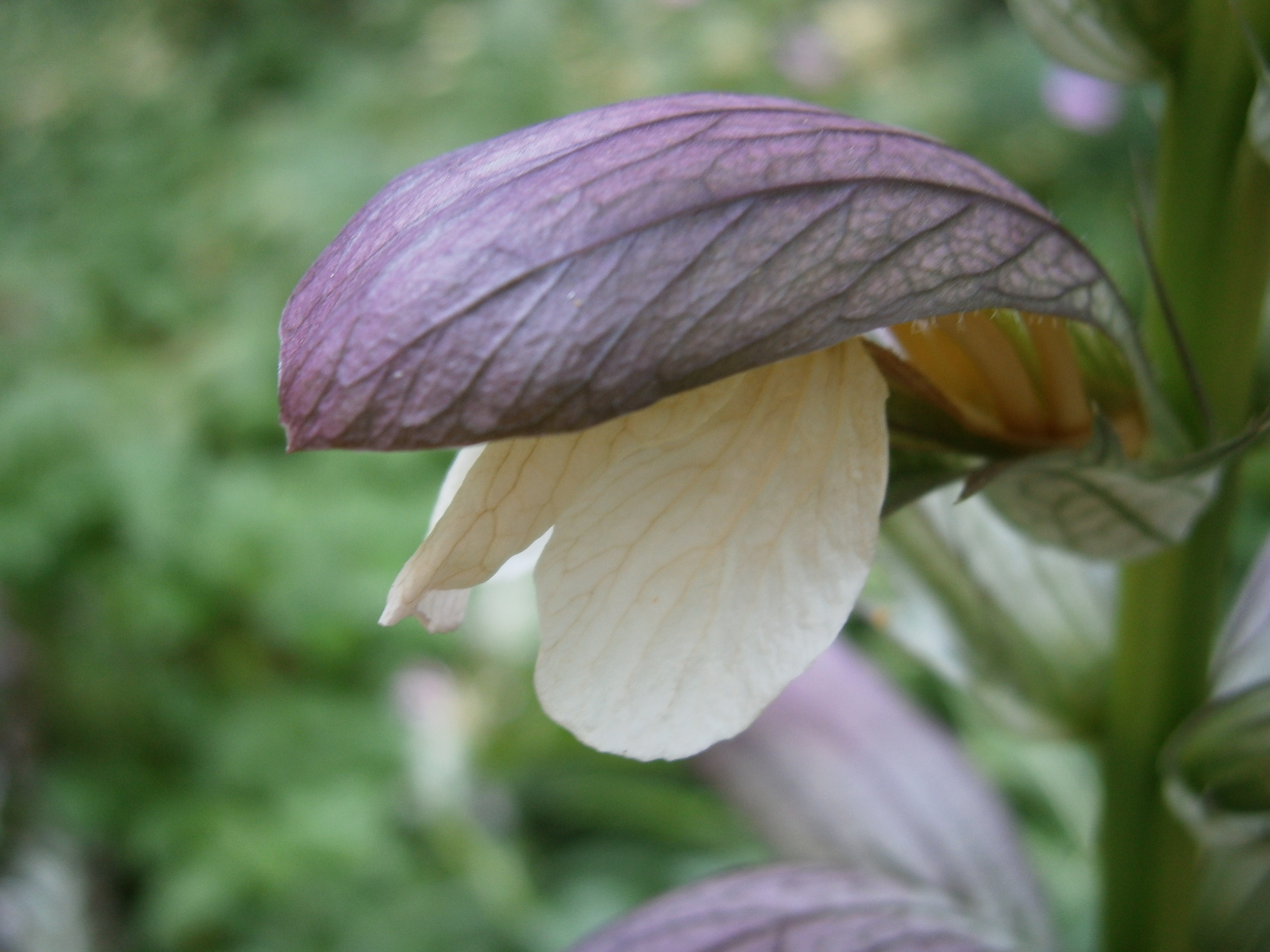
Flower close-up

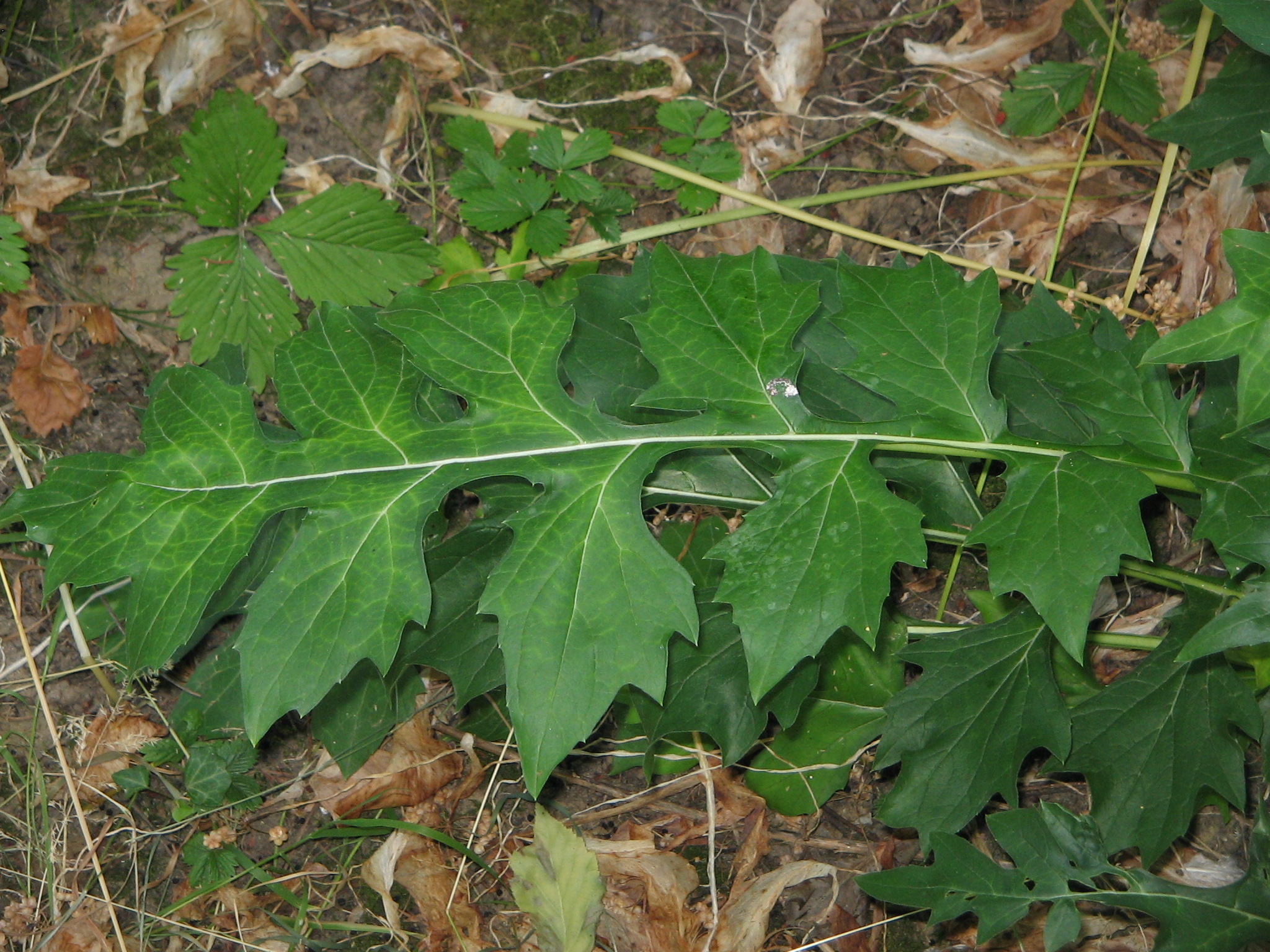
Leaf
