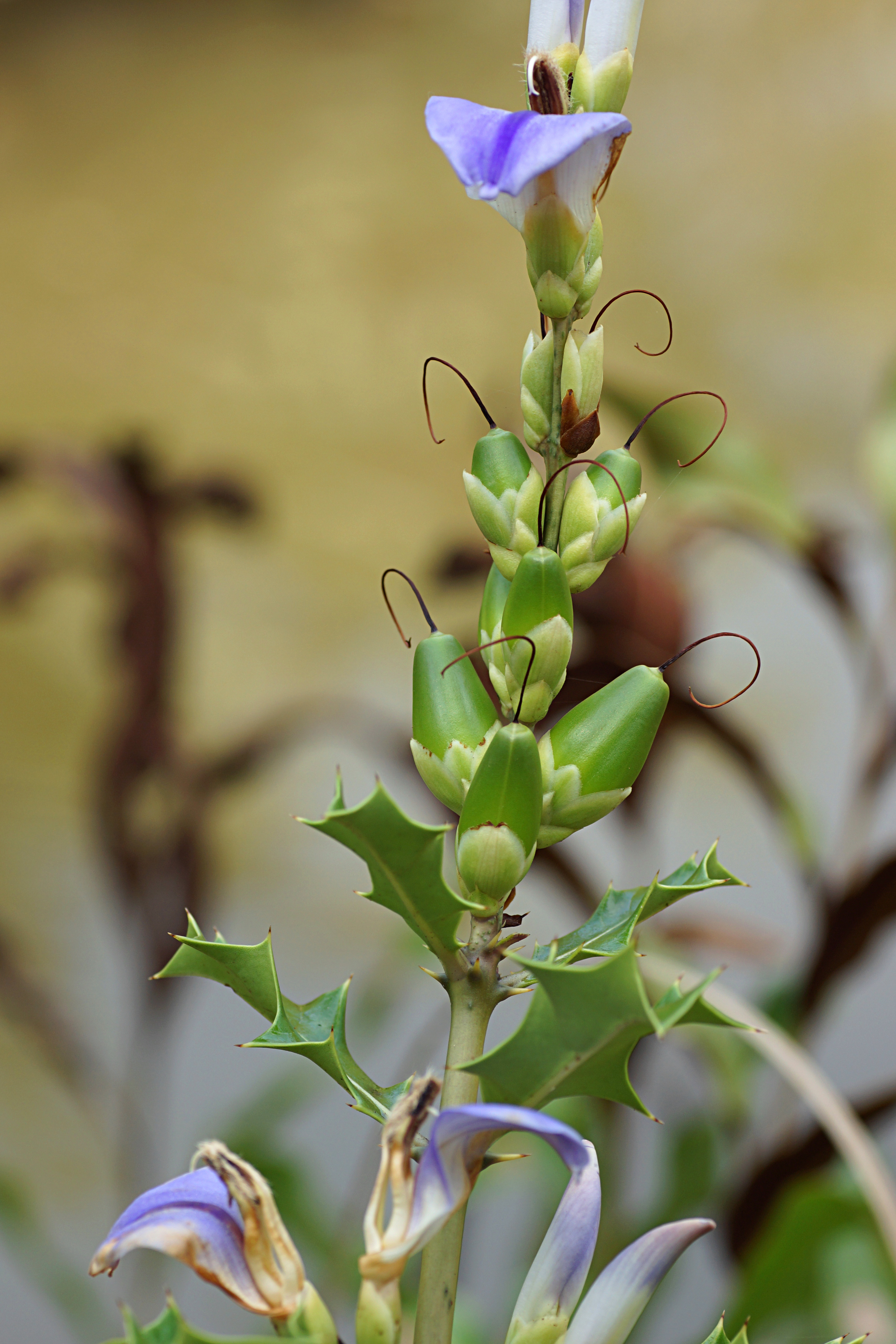

Conservation status
- Least Concern (IUCN 3.1)

Scientific classification
- Kingdom: Plantae
- Clade: Tracheophytes
- Clade: Angiosperms
- Clade: Eudicots
- Clade: Asterids
- Order: Lamiales
- Family: Acanthaceae
- Genus: Acanthus
- Species: A. ilicifolius

Binomial name
- Acanthus ilicifolius L.

Synonyms
- Acanthus ebracteatus Vahl var. xiamenensis (R.T.Zhang) C.Y.Wu & C.C.Hu; Acanthus xiamensis R.T.Zhang

= Acanthus ilicifolius =

Species of flowering plant

Acanthus ilicifolius, commonly known as holly-leaved acanthus, sea holly, and holly mangrove, is a species of shrubs or herbs, of the plant family Acanthaceae, native to Australia, Australasia, mainland China, Hong Kong, and Southeast Asia. It is used as medicine in asthma and rheumatism.

== Description ==
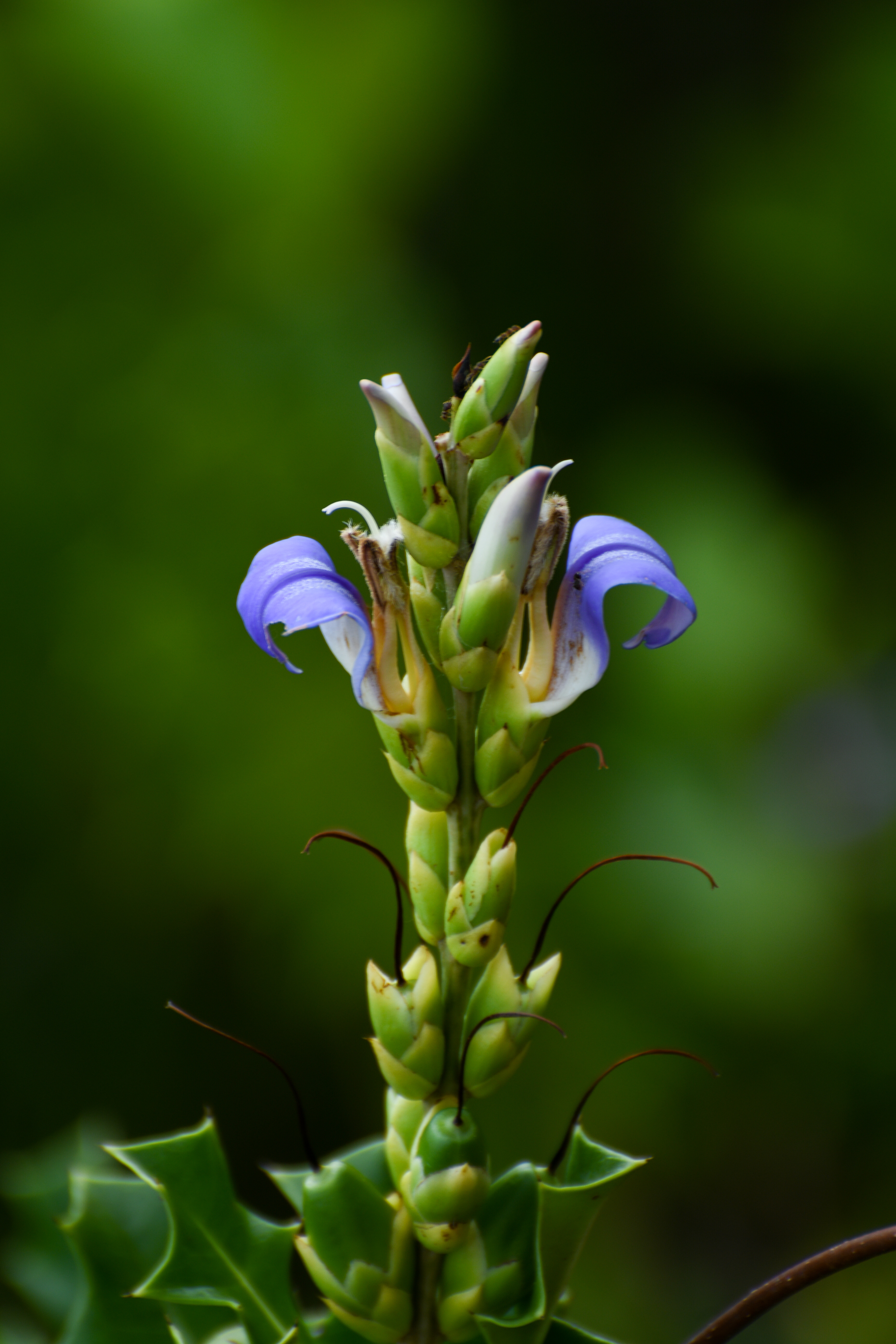
From Kerala, India

This species is an erect shrub reaching up to 2 metres (6 ft 7 in) tall, with stout, mostly unbranched, and glabrous stems. The petioles are thick (3–6 mm), hairless, and bear two stipule-like spines at the base. The leaves have oblong to oblong-lanceolate blades (6–14 × 2–5 cm) that are pinnatifid, with an acute base, truncate apex, and margins bearing a few large spines; they are glabrous, with 5–7 pairs of lateral veins extending to the teeth. The inflorescences are terminal spikes up to 16.5 cm long, with broad ovate, caducous bracts (7–8 mm) and leathery ovate bracteoles (about 5 mm). The calyx has four lobes, with the two outer lobes larger (10–13 mm), emarginate at the apex and scarious at the margins, and the two inner lobes smaller, ovate, and entire. The corolla is pale and 3–4 cm long, with a short tube (6 mm), a reduced upper lip, and a three-lobed lower lip that is obovate, thin-leathery, and softly hairy on the outside. There are four equal stamens, with anthers splitting longitudinally and bearing hairs along the suture, and filaments about 1.5 cm long. The style is about 2.2 cm long, longitudinally lined, with a two-lobed stigma. The fruit is an elliptic capsule (2.5–3 cm) containing four flattened, ellipsoidal, light yellow seeds.

== Distribution and habitat ==
The species is widespread Southeast Asia, Indochina, Indonesia, the Philippines and northern Australia. It occurs in mangrove habitats.

== Subspecies ==
Two subspecies are accepted:

- Acanthus ilicifolius var. ilicifolius
- Acanthus ilicifolius var. integrifolius T.Anderson ex C.B.Clarke
