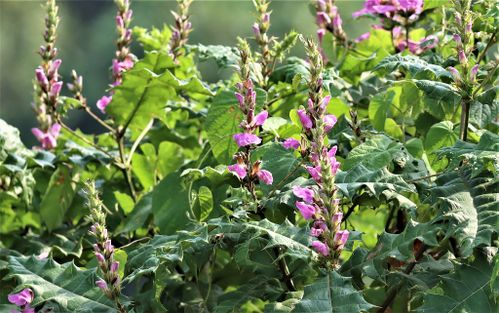

Scientific classification
- Kingdom: Plantae
- Clade: Tracheophytes
- Clade: Angiosperms
- Clade: Eudicots
- Clade: Asterids
- Order: Lamiales
- Family: Acanthaceae
- Genus: Acanthus
- Species: A. eminens

Binomial name
- Acanthus eminens C.B. Clarke (1899)

= Acanthus eminens =

Species of flowering plant

Acanthus eminens is a species of flowering plant in the genus Acanthus. It is primarily found in the tropical regions of Eastern Africa, particularly in Ethiopia, South Sudan, Uganda and Kenya.

== Description ==
It is a perennial shrub that typically grows up to 3 m (9.8 ft) tall. It has pinnatifid, dark green leaves with deeply lobed margins. The flowers are produced in tall, dense spikes, being purple or violet, (Note: Acanthus eminens detailed description: "Acanthus eminens C.B.Clarke [family ACANTHACEAE] on JSTOR". plants.jstor.org.; "Acanthus eminens in Global Plants on JSTOR". plants.jstor.org. "ACANTHUS eminens C. B. Clarke [Family: ACANTHACEAE] Information : Glabrate, 6–8 ft high. Inflorescence pubescent. Leaves 10 × 4 in., pinnatifid, spinous, with almost no petiole. Spike 9 × 2 1/2 in.; bracts scarcely 1 in. long, ovate, barely acute, with several spines along the margin; bracteoles 1/4 in. long, subulate, not spinous. Calyx soft, not spinescent; posticous segment 1 1/5 × nearly 1/2 in., broadly oblong, not lanceolate towards the apex; anticous segment of the same size and shape, 2-nerved, minutely emarginate at the tip; 2 innermost segments 2/3–3/4 in. long, lanceolate. Corolla 2 in. long, purple (Scott-Elliot). Ovary large, with a hemispherical cap; style densely short-hairy in the lower half.") or blue in colour. It suffers from fragmentation, pollinator limitation, and inbreeding.
