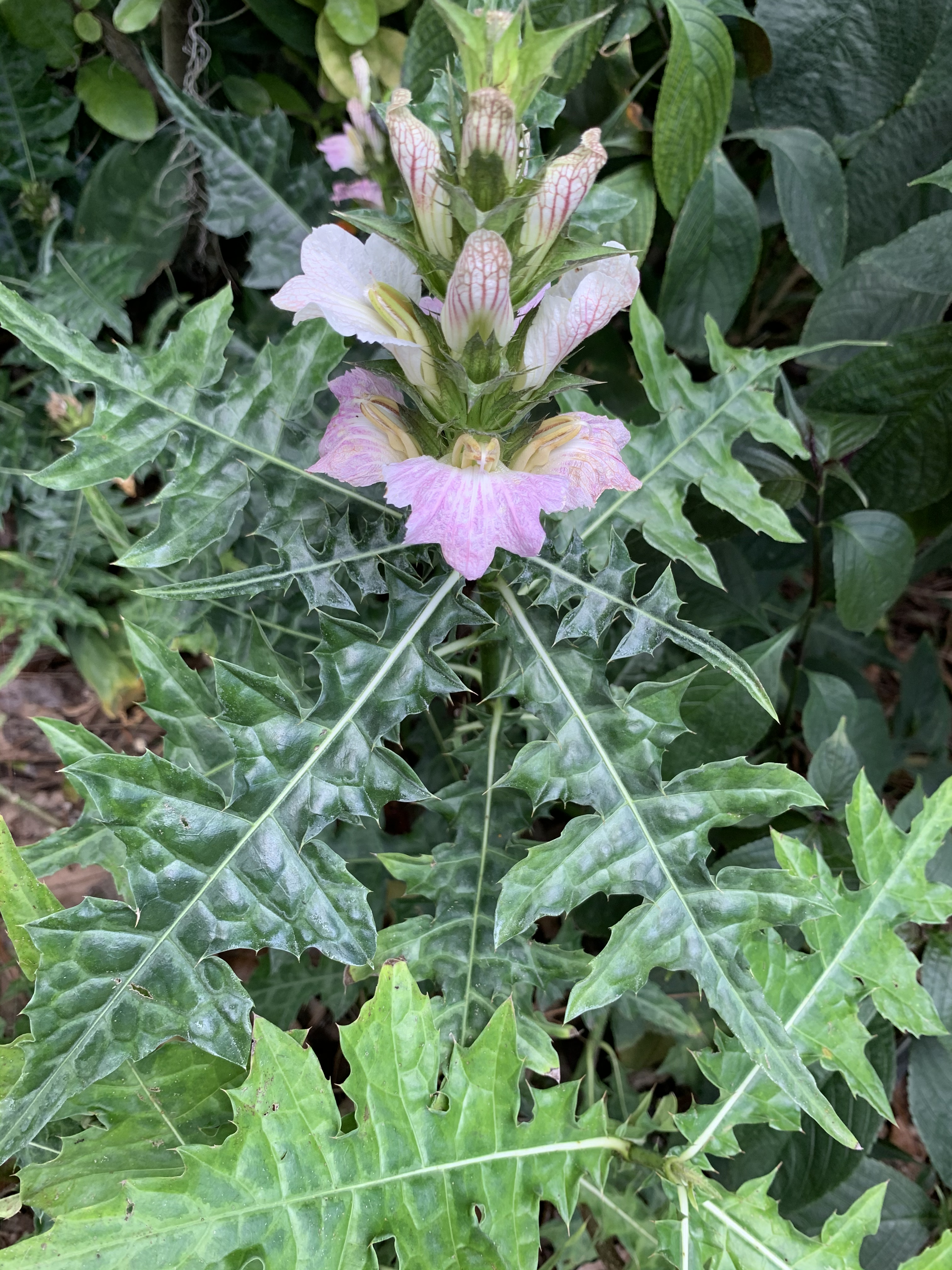

Conservation status
- Least Concern (IUCN 3.1)

Scientific classification
- Kingdom: Plantae
- Clade: Tracheophytes
- Clade: Angiosperms
- Clade: Eudicots
- Clade: Asterids
- Order: Lamiales
- Family: Acanthaceae
- Genus: Acanthus
- Species: A. montanus

Binomial name
- Acanthus montanus (Nees) T.Anderson (1863)

Synonyms
- Acanthus barteri T.Anderson (1863); Cheilopsis montana Nees (1847)

= Acanthus montanus =

Species of flowering plant

Acanthus montanus, also known as bear's breech or mountain thistle and in Igbo; ogwu_agamevu (in Agbani, Enugu State Nigeria) is a species of flowering plant in the genus Acanthus. It is native to tropical Africa, growing in wet and shady places like stream borders in Sierra Leone in West Africa and from Benin to Chad, Zambia, and Angola in central Africa.

== Description ==
It is a thinly branched perennial with basal clusters of oblong to lance-shaped glossy, dark green leaves reaching up to 12 inches (30 cm) long. The base of the stem is woody, and the nodes of the stem are hairy. The leaves have silver marks, wavy margins and thorns. It reaches up to 6 feet (1.8 m) tall and about 24 inches (61 cm) wide. Spikes of pale pink flowers appear summer to fall.

In cultivation it prefers shady situations and occasional deep watering, but tolerates sunny, dry situations too. Its aggressive roots make this plant well suited to slopes.
