= Acanthus gaed =

Scientific classification
- Kingdom: Plantae
- Clade: Tracheophytes
- Clade: Angiosperms
- Clade: Eudicots
- Clade: Asterids
- Order: Lamiales
- Family: Acanthaceae
- Genus: Acanthus
- Species: A. gaed

Binomial name
- Acanthus gaed Lindau

Species of flowering plant

Acanthus gaed is a species of flowering plant in the genus of Acanthus. It is native to North Somalia and grows primarily in subtropical biomes.

== Description ==
It is a shrub reaching heights of 1 to 3.6 meters. The leaves, measuring 5–15 cm in length and 2–7 cm in width, are sinuate-lobed. Bracts are lanceolate, approximately 18–25 mm long, with three parallel veins, a spinose tip, and spinose-dentate margins. Bracteoles are linear, shorter than the bracts, with a single midvein. The calyx with the upper lobe measuring 12–18 mm and the lower lobe 15–23 mm in length. The corolla is pink or mauve with darker veins, about 25 mm long. Filaments are approximately 12 mm long, and anthers are about 4 mm long. The style is around 14 mm long.

Acanthus polystachius, found in Ethiopia and Sudan, is a closely related species with even larger corollas over 50 mm.
