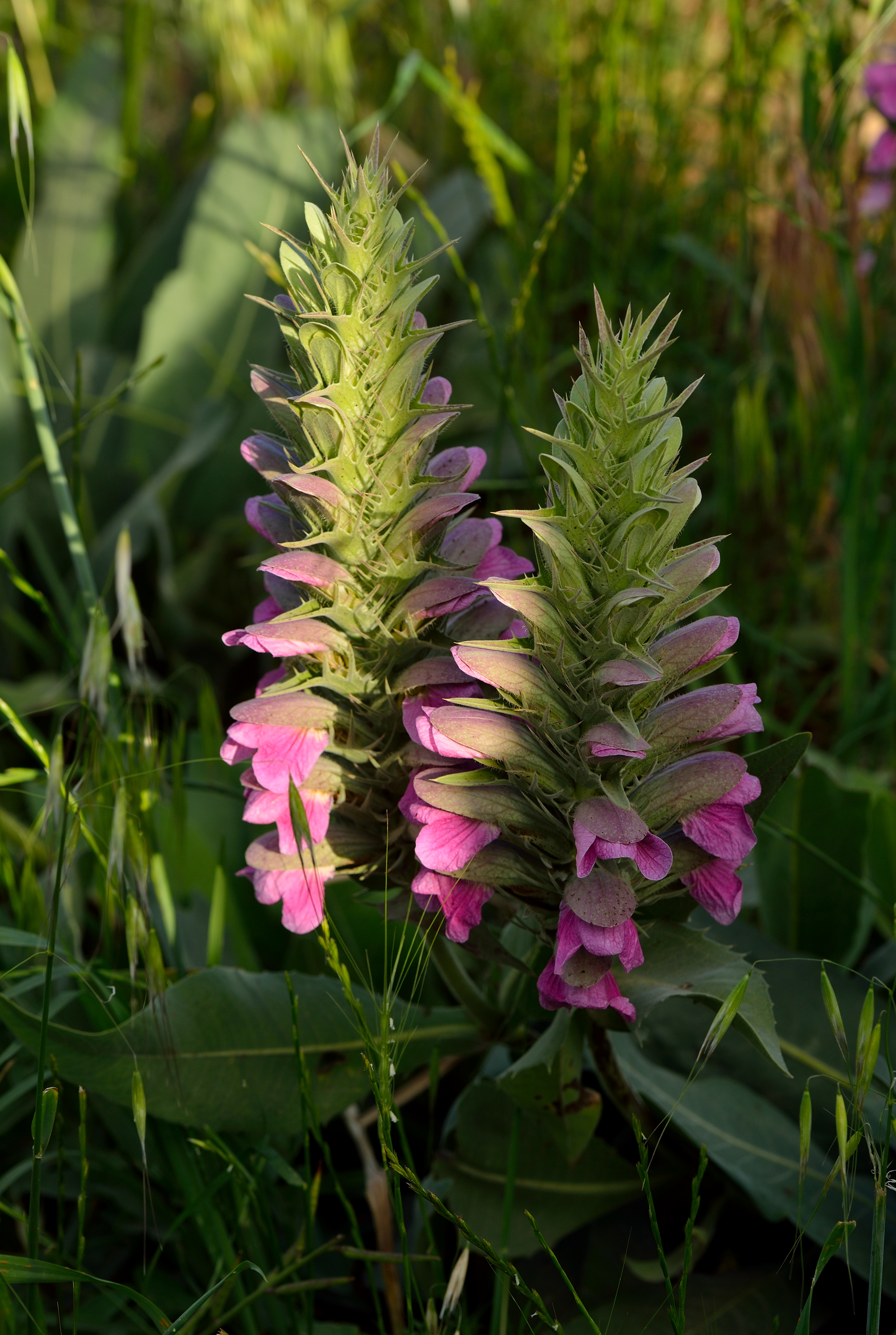
- Acanthus dioscoridis var. dioscoridis

Scientific classification
- Kingdom: Plantae
- Clade: Tracheophytes
- Clade: Angiosperms
- Clade: Eudicots
- Clade: Asterids
- Order: Lamiales
- Family: Acanthaceae
- Genus: Acanthus
- Species: A. dioscoridis

Binomial name
- Acanthus dioscoridis L.

= Acanthus dioscoridis =

Species of flowering plant

Acanthus dioscoridis is a species of flowering plant in the genus Acanthus, family Acanthaceae. A shrub, it is native to wetlands from southern Turkey to western Iran, including Iraq, Lebanon, Syria, Armenia, Georgia, and Azerbaijan.

== Description ==
It is a herbaceous perennial notable for its compact size, finely cut thistle-like foliage, and pink or red flower. This plant thrives in full sun or partial shade, adapting to most soils. It grows 45–75 cm (18–30 in) tall and wide, spreading slowly via rhizomes.

== Infraspecies ==
It has four infraspecies:

- Acanthus dioscoridis var. dioscoridis
- Acanthus dioscoridis var. brevicaulis (Freyn) E.Hossain
- Acanthus dioscoridis var. laciniatus Freyn
- Acanthus dioscoridis var. perringii (Siehe) E.Hossain

In the 1997 IUCN Red List of Threatened Plants all but Acanthus dioscoridis var. dioscoridis were listed as rare, but none are listed in the 2024-2 registry.
