= Acanthus caudatus =

Scientific classification
- Kingdom: Plantae
- Clade: Tracheophytes
- Clade: Angiosperms
- Clade: Eudicots
- Clade: Asterids
- Order: Lamiales
- Family: Acanthaceae
- Genus: Acanthus
- Species: A. caudatus

Binomial name
- Acanthus caudatus Lindau (1894)

Species of flowering plant

Acanthus caudatus is a species of flowering plant in the genus of Acanthus. It is native to Angola and exists as a shrub.
