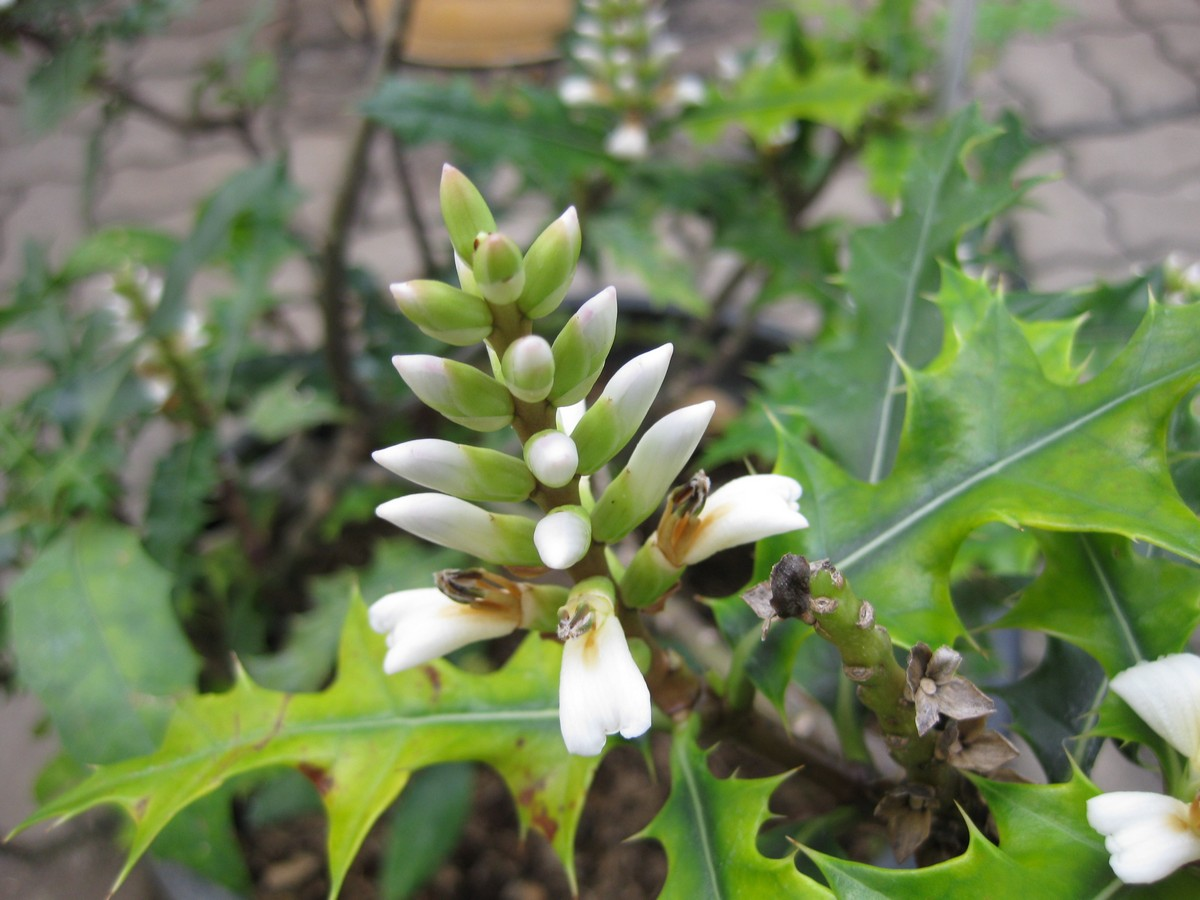

Scientific classification
- Kingdom: Plantae
- Clade: Tracheophytes
- Clade: Angiosperms
- Clade: Eudicots
- Clade: Asterids
- Order: Lamiales
- Family: Acanthaceae
- Genus: Acanthus
- Species: A. ebracteatus

Binomial name
- Acanthus ebracteatus Vahl

Subspecies
- A. ebracteatus subsp. ebracteatus A. ebracteatus subsp. ebarbatus

= Acanthus ebracteatus =

Species of flowering plant

Acanthus ebracteatus is a species of shrubby herb that grows in the undergrowth of mangroves of south-east Asia. Common names include sea holly and holly mangrove.

== Description ==
It grows as an erect, spreading or scrambling shrubby herb, up to 1.5 metres tall, usually with a great many stems. Its leaves are dark green, stiff, with sharp spines at the end of each deep lobe: very much like those of holly (Ilex). Flowers are blue, purple or white, and occur in spikes terminal on the branches. The fruit is a square-shaped capsule, which explodes when ripe, projecting the seeds up to two metres from the plant. Seeds are off-white and flat.

== Taxonomy ==
This species was first described by Martin Vahl in his 1791 Symbolae Botanicae. In 1806 Christiaan Persoon transferred it into Dilivaria, but this was not accepted.

Two subspecies are recognised, the autonym A. ebracteatus subsp. ebracteatus, and A. ebracteatus subsp. ebarbatus, described in 1986.

== Distribution and habitat ==
Widely distributed in Southeast Asia, including China, India and Australia.

== Medicinal uses ==
The leaves of Acanthus ebracteatus, noted for their antioxidant properties, are used for making herbal tea in Thailand and Indonesia.
