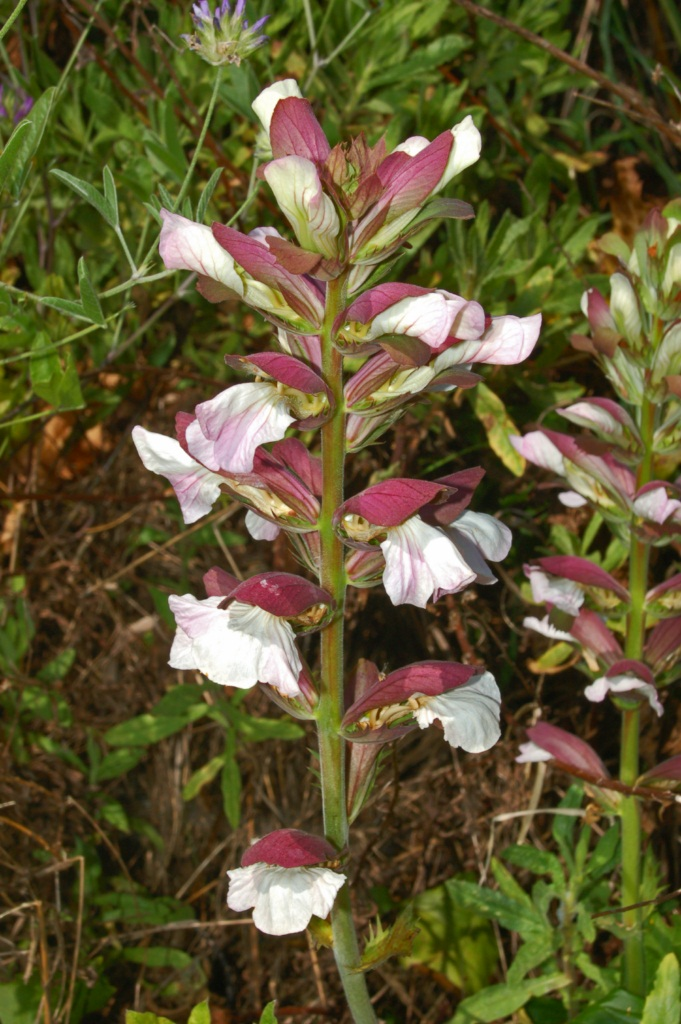
- Inflorescence of Acanthus mollis

Scientific classification
- Kingdom: Plantae
- Clade: Tracheophytes
- Clade: Angiosperms
- Clade: Eudicots
- Clade: Asterids
- Order: Lamiales
- Family: Acanthaceae
- Genus: Acanthus
- Species: A. mollis

Binomial name
- Acanthus mollis L.

Synonyms
- Acanthus hispanicus Loudon; Acanthus latifolius E.Goeze; Acanthus longifolius Poir.; Acanthus lusitanicus auct.; Acanthus niger Mill.; Acanthus platyphyllus Murb.; Acanthus spinosissimus Host nom. illeg.

= Acanthus mollis =

Bear's breeches

Species of flowering plant

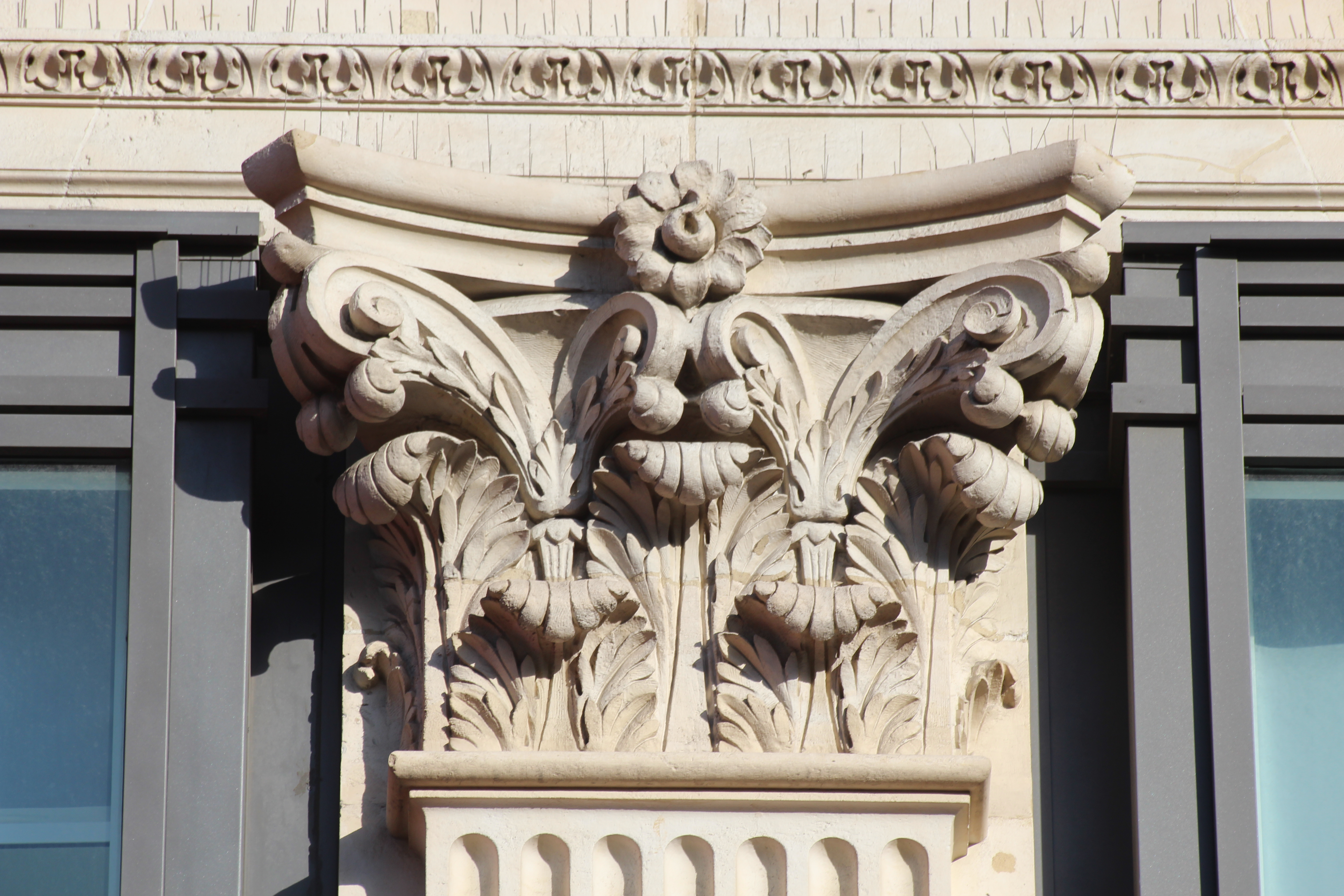
Capital of a Corinthian pilaster in Paris

Acanthus mollis, commonly known as bear's breeches, sea dock, bear's foot plant, sea holly, gator plant or oyster plant, is a species of plant in the family Acanthaceae and is native to the Mediterranean region. It is a leafy, clump-forming perennial herb, with a rosette of relatively large, lobed or toothed leaves, and purplish and white flowers on an erect spike.

== Description ==
Acanthus mollis is a leafy, clump-forming perennial herb with tuberous roots. It has a basal rosette of dark glossy green, lobed or divided, glabrous leaves 50 cm (20 in) long and 30 cm (12 in) wide on a petiole 20–30 cm (7.9–11.8 in) long. The flowers are borne on an erect spike up to 200 cm (79 in) tall emerging from the leaf rosette. The sepals are purplish and function as the upper and lower lips of the petals, the upper lip about 4 cm (1.6 in) long and the lower lip 3 cm (1.2 in) long. The petals are about 4–4.5 cm (1.6–1.8 in) long and form a tube with a ring of hairs where the stamens are attached. Flowering occurs in summer and the fruit is a sharply-pointed capsule about 2 cm (0.79 in) long containing one or two brown seeds about 14 mm (0.55 in) long and 8 mm (0.31 in) wide.

== Taxonomy and naming ==
Acanthus mollis was first formally described in 1753 by Carl Linnaeus in his book Species Plantarum. The name of the genus derives from the Greek name of the plant ἄκανθος ákanthos; it was imitated in Corinthian capitals. This ἄκανθος ákanthos is related to ἄκανθα ákantha meaning "thorn" referring to the thorn-bearing sepals, or any thorny or prickly plant in Greek. The Latin name of the species, mollis meaning "soft, smooth", refers to the texture of the leaves.

== Distribution and ecology ==
Although native to the eastern and central Mediterranean, Acanthus mollis has spread throughout much of western Europe and certain parts of the Americas, Australia, Syria and New Zealand, where it is regarded as invasive.

Acanthus mollis is entomophilous, pollinated only by bees or bumble bees large enough to force their way between the upper sepal and the lower, so that they can reach the nectar at the bottom of the tube.

== Use in horticulture ==
These plants are usually propagated from tubers and tend to form large, localized clumps which can survive for several decades and look statuesque when well-grown, but its suitability as a garden plant is lessened on account of its aggressive spread (new plants are produced readily both from seed and portions of root) and its susceptibility to attacks from slugs and snails.

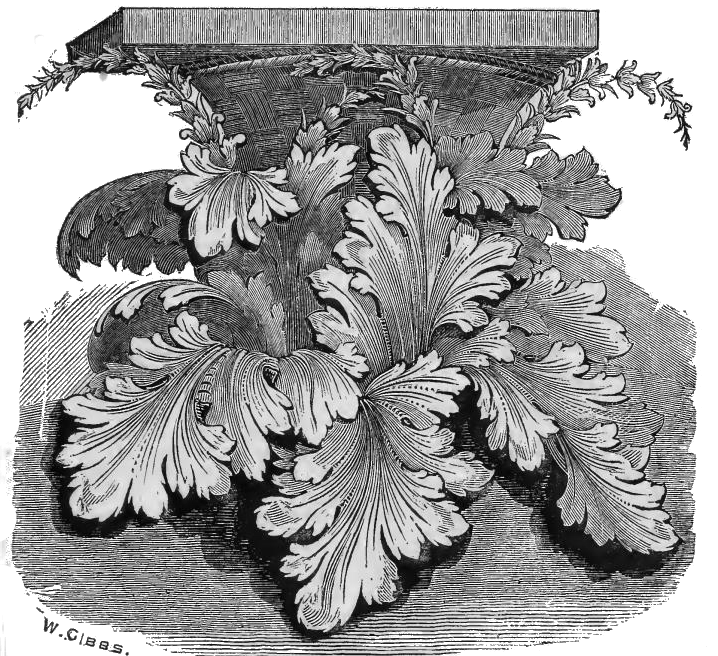
Sketch from The Decorator's Assistant magazine, 1847

== Cultural depiction ==
The shape of the leaf of this plant inspired the ancient Greek sculptor Callimachus (fifth c. BCE) to model the capital of the Corinthian column. Since then, the Corinthian order column has been used extensively in Greco-Roman and Classical architecture. For centuries, stone or bronze stylized versions of acanthus leaves have appeared as acanthus decorations on certain styles of architecture and furniture.

Virgil described Helen of Troy as wearing a dress embroidered with Acanthus leaves.

== Gallery ==
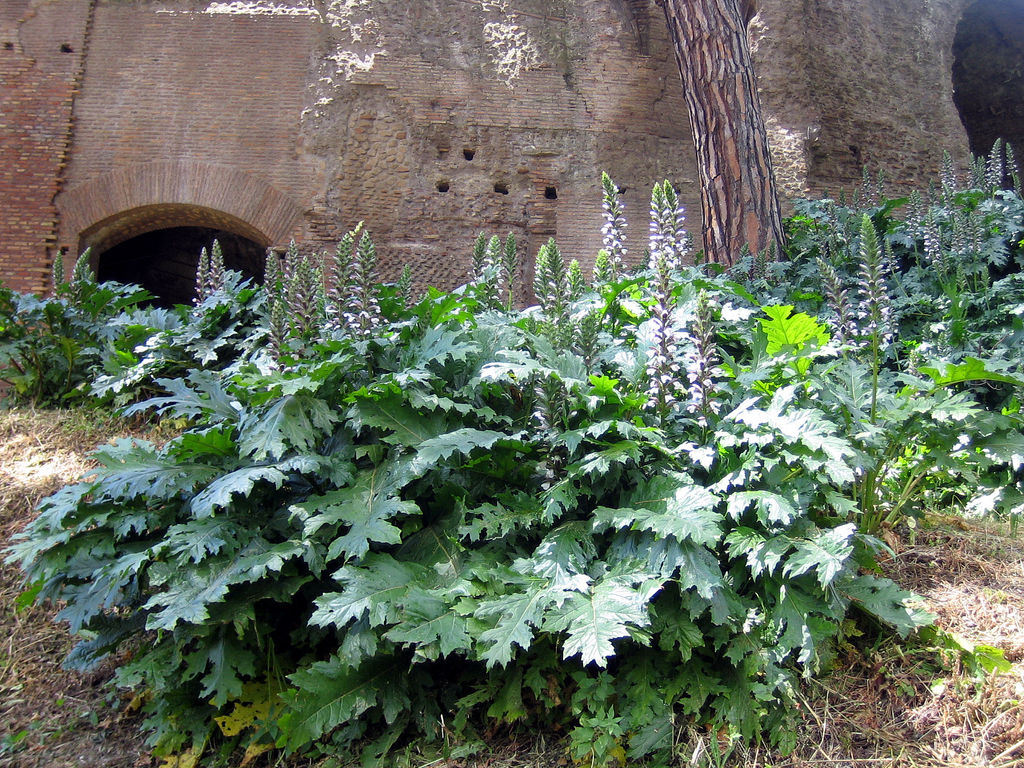
Habit

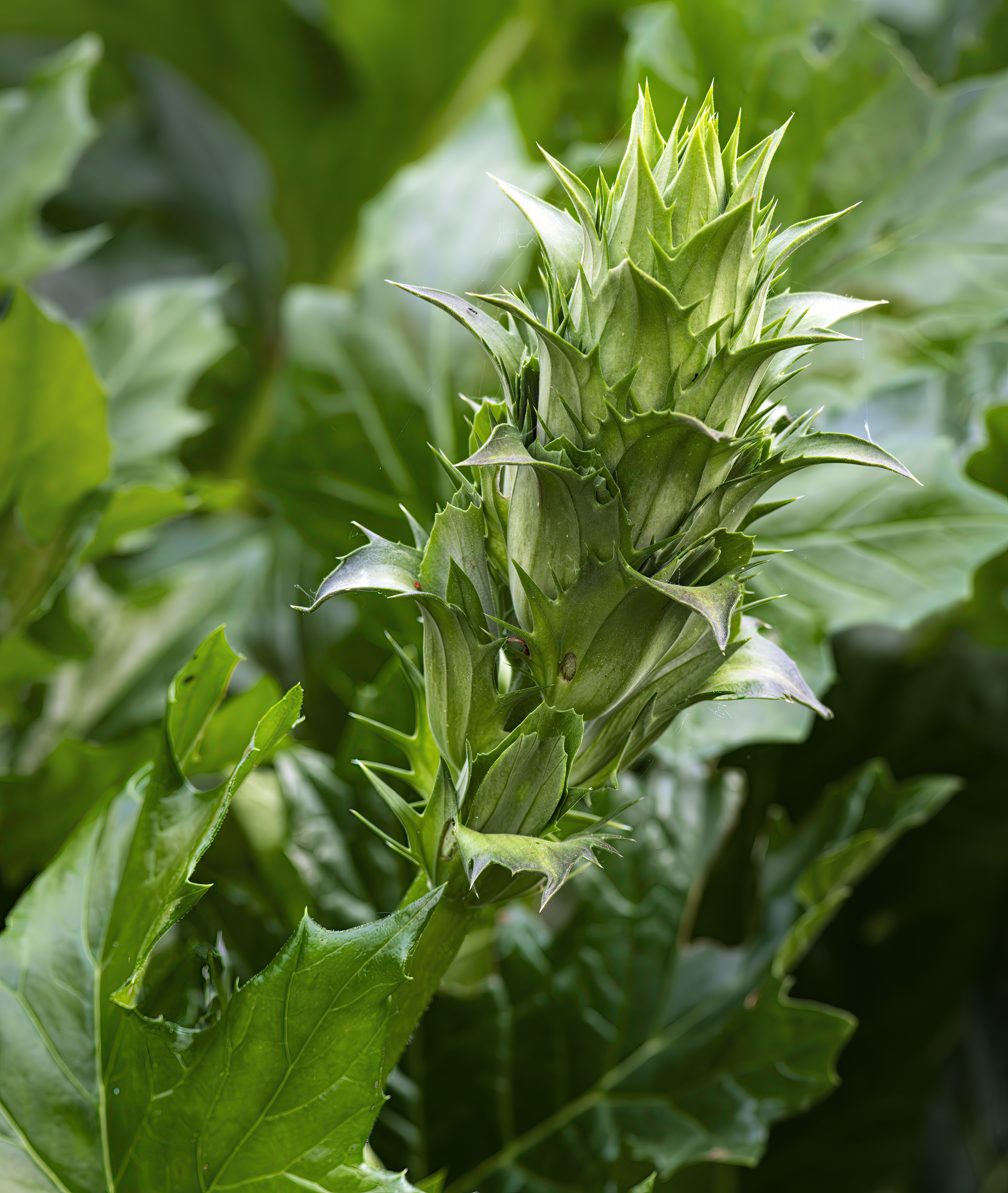
Bud

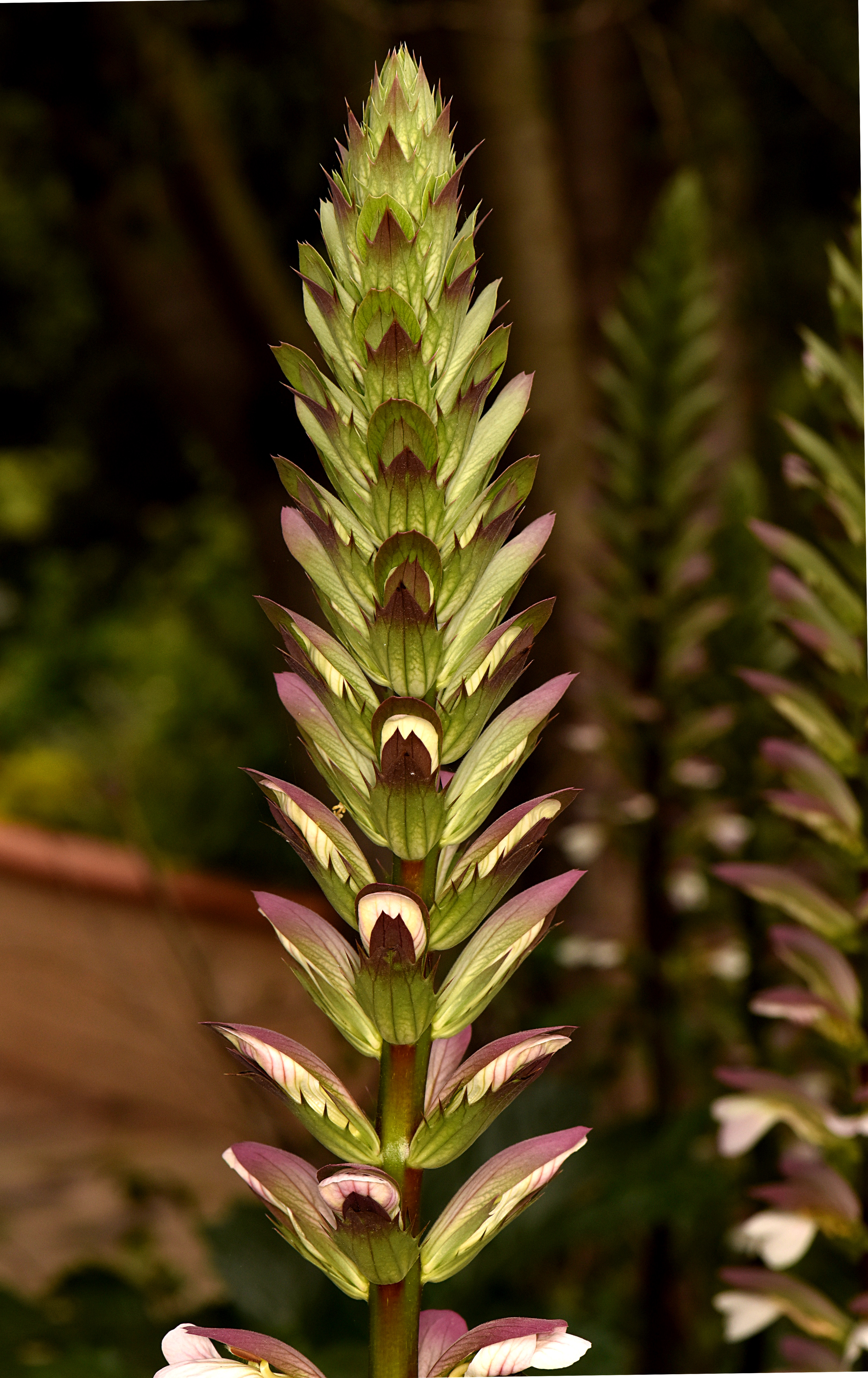
Inflorescence

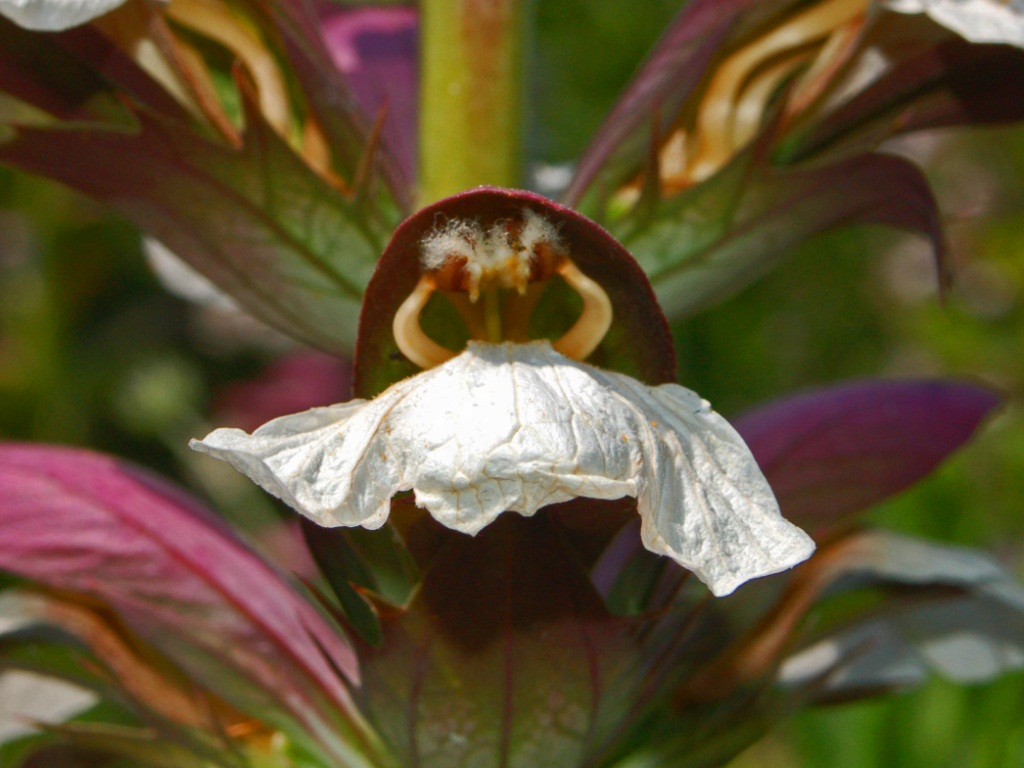
Close-up of stamens

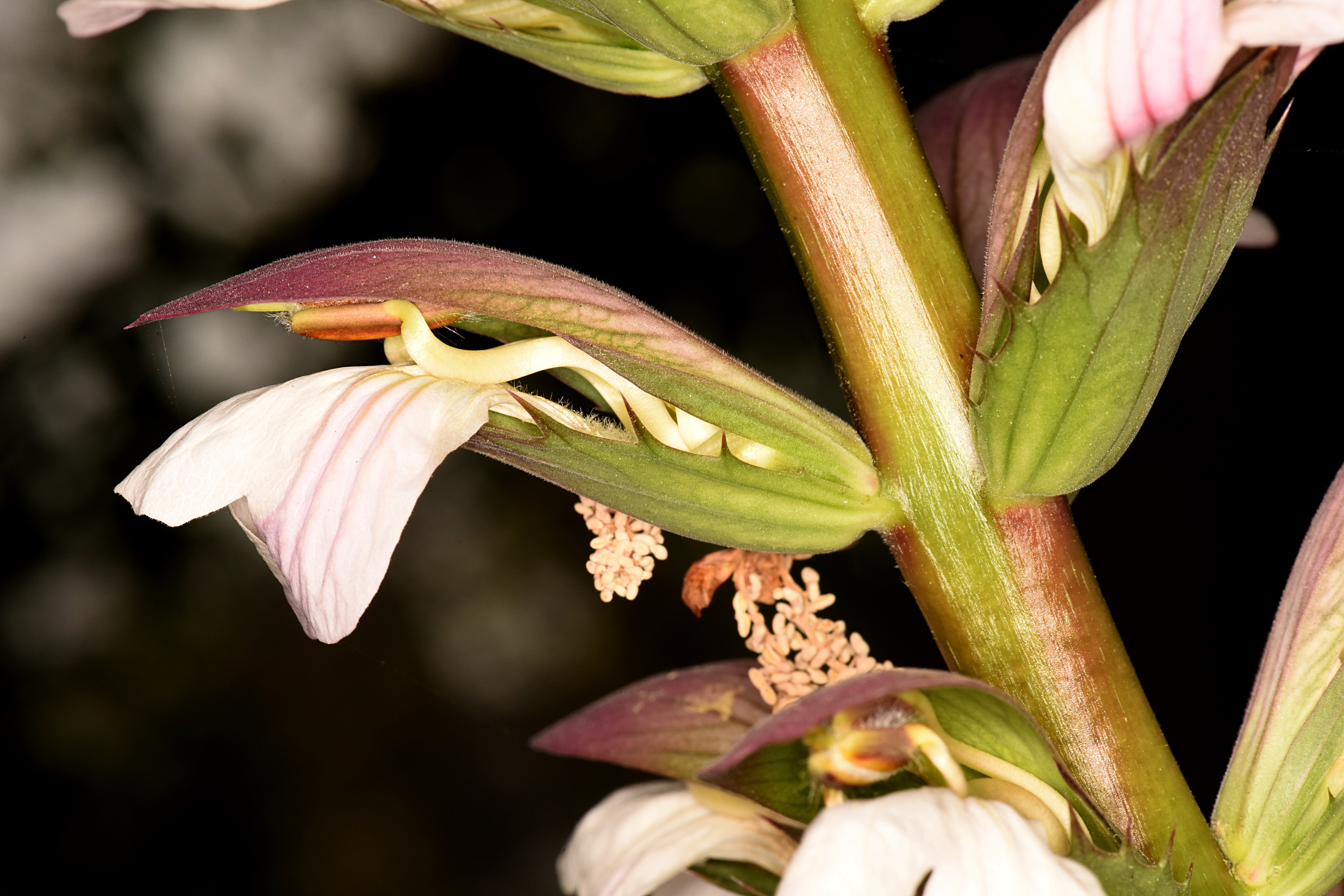
Lateral view

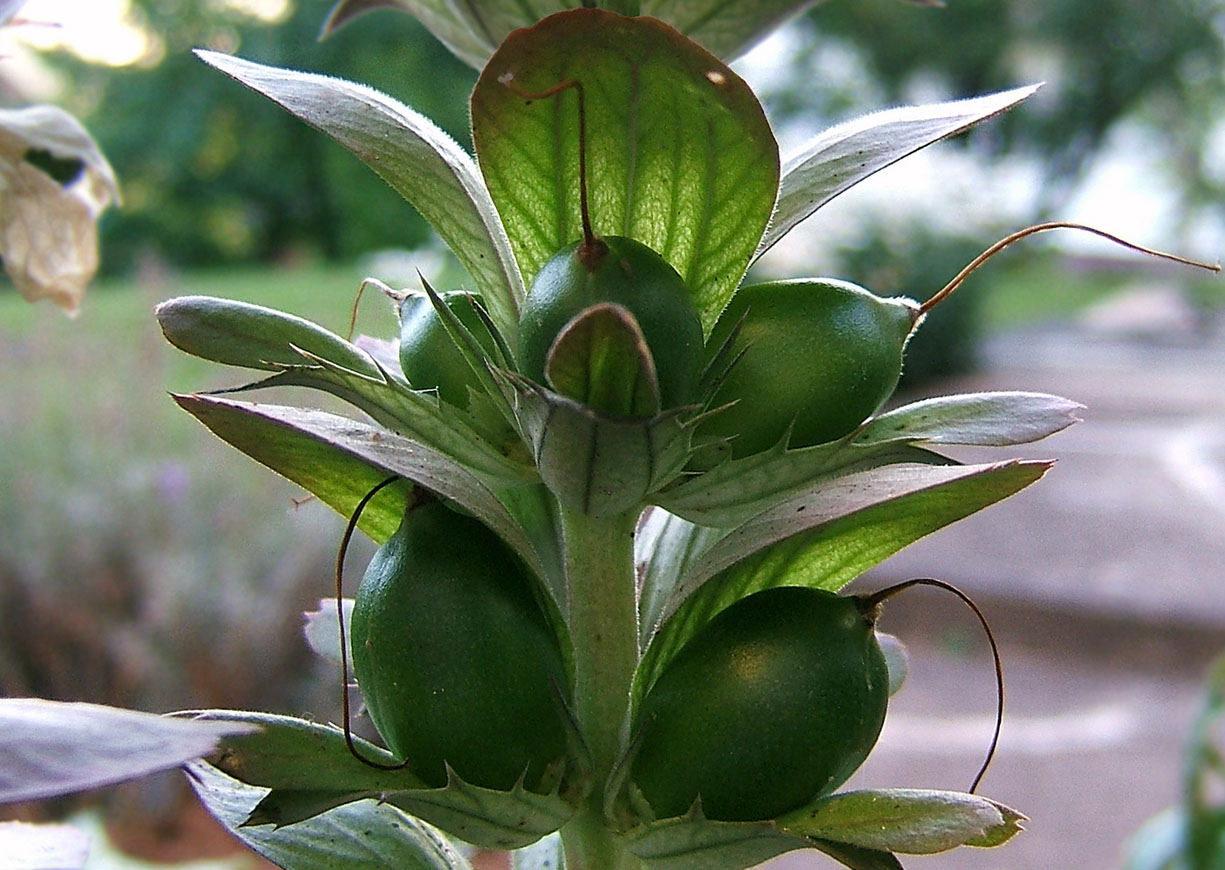
Fruit

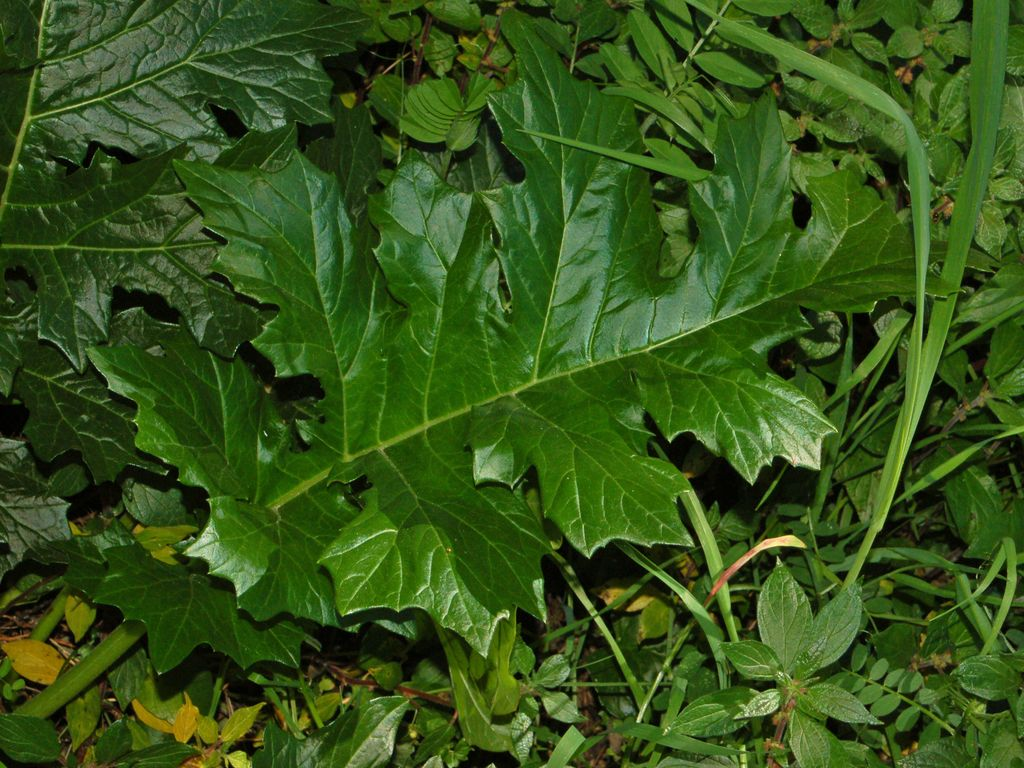
Leaf

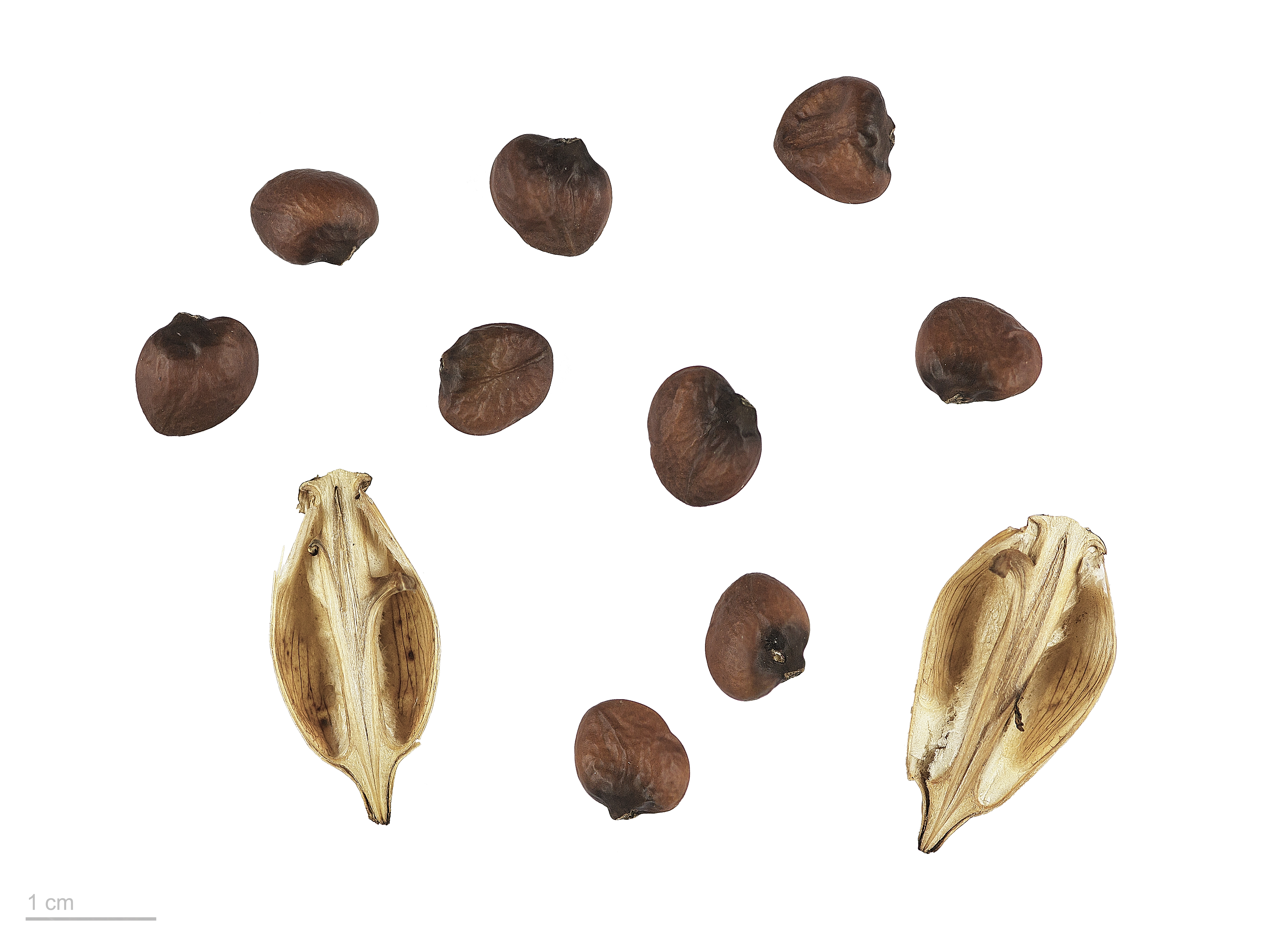
Fruit and seeds

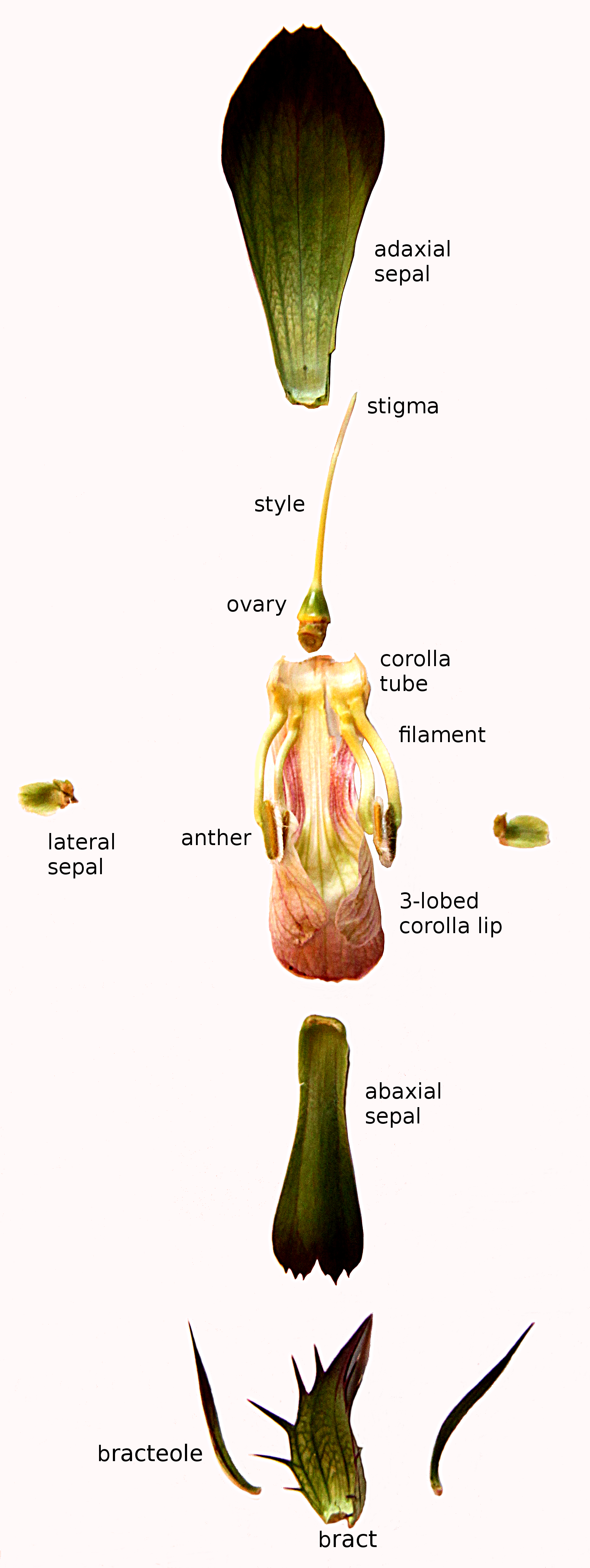
Dismembered flower
