= Thomas Anderson (botanist) =

Scottish botanist (1832–1870)

Thomas Anderson FLS
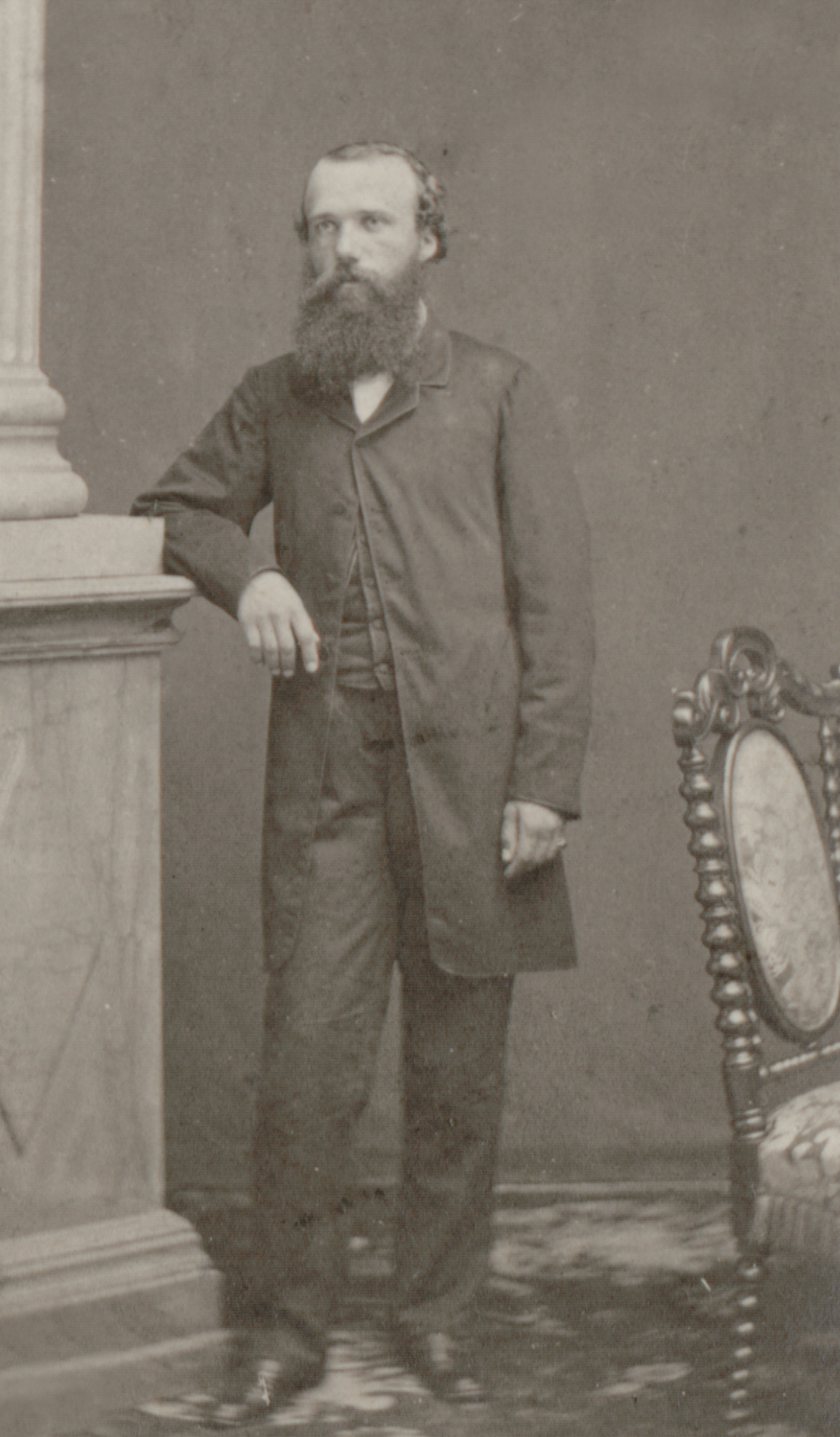
- Born: 26 February 1832; Edinburgh, Scotland
- Died: 26 October 1870 (aged 38); Edinburgh, Scotland
- Resting place: Dean Cemetery, Edinburgh; 55°57′01″N 3°13′53″W
- Education: University of Edinburgh (MD)
- Known for: Research on cinchona cultivation in India, Florula Adenensis
- Spouse: Elizabeth Cleghorn
- Scientific career
- Fields: Botany
- Workplaces: Bengal Medical Service; Calcutta Botanic Garden
- Thesis: (1853)
- Author abbrev. (botany): T.Anderson

Thomas Anderson FLS (26 February 1832 – 26 October 1870) was a Scottish botanist who worked in India. He was involved in research on cinchona cultivation in India.

== Life ==
Anderson was born in Edinburgh in 1832. He studied medicine at the University of Edinburgh, graduating with an MD in 1853 with a thesis on the actions of Atropa Belladonna. While at University he became interested in botany, and earned a gold medal for the best local collection of plants, and assisted in arranging the Indian herbarium. In 1854 he entered the Bengal medical service, and went to Calcutta. Subsequently, he went to Lucknow and Delhi, and then to the Himalayas. He returned during the mutiny to Delhi and gave his medical services, returning to Calcutta in 1858 as Garrison Assistant Surgeon at Fort William. His health failing, he came home, and, the steamer being detained at Aden for some days, he made collections of the plants of that region, upon which he based his Florula Adenensis (1860). He was elected Fellow of the Linnean Society in 1859. About this time he returned to India, taking temporary charge of the Calcutta Botanic Garden during the absence of Dr Thomas Thomson, whom he afterwards succeeded as director. His brother, John Anderson was a zoologist.

Anderson introduced valuable medicinal plants, especially cinchona and ipecacuanha at the Sibpur botanical gardens and conducted experiments on their culltivation. He was involved in organizing the forest department in Bengal from 1864 but gave up after two years due to other work pressures and in 1868 poor health forced him to take leave. He returned to Scotland and worked on his herbaria towards a flora of India. The difficult order Acanthaceae received his special attention; but before his work could be completed he was again attacked by illness, and died at Edinburgh of disease of the liver on 26 October 1870.

He is buried in Dean Cemetery in western Edinburgh. The grave lies facing the east–west path pointing at the pyramid, but is set behind the front line of stones.

Botanical specimens collected by Anderson are cared for at the National Herbarium of Victoria (MEL), Royal Botanic Gardens Victoria. The standard author abbreviation T.Anderson is used to indicate this person as the author when citing a botanical name.

== Family ==
He was married to Elizabeth Cleghorn (1830-1914).

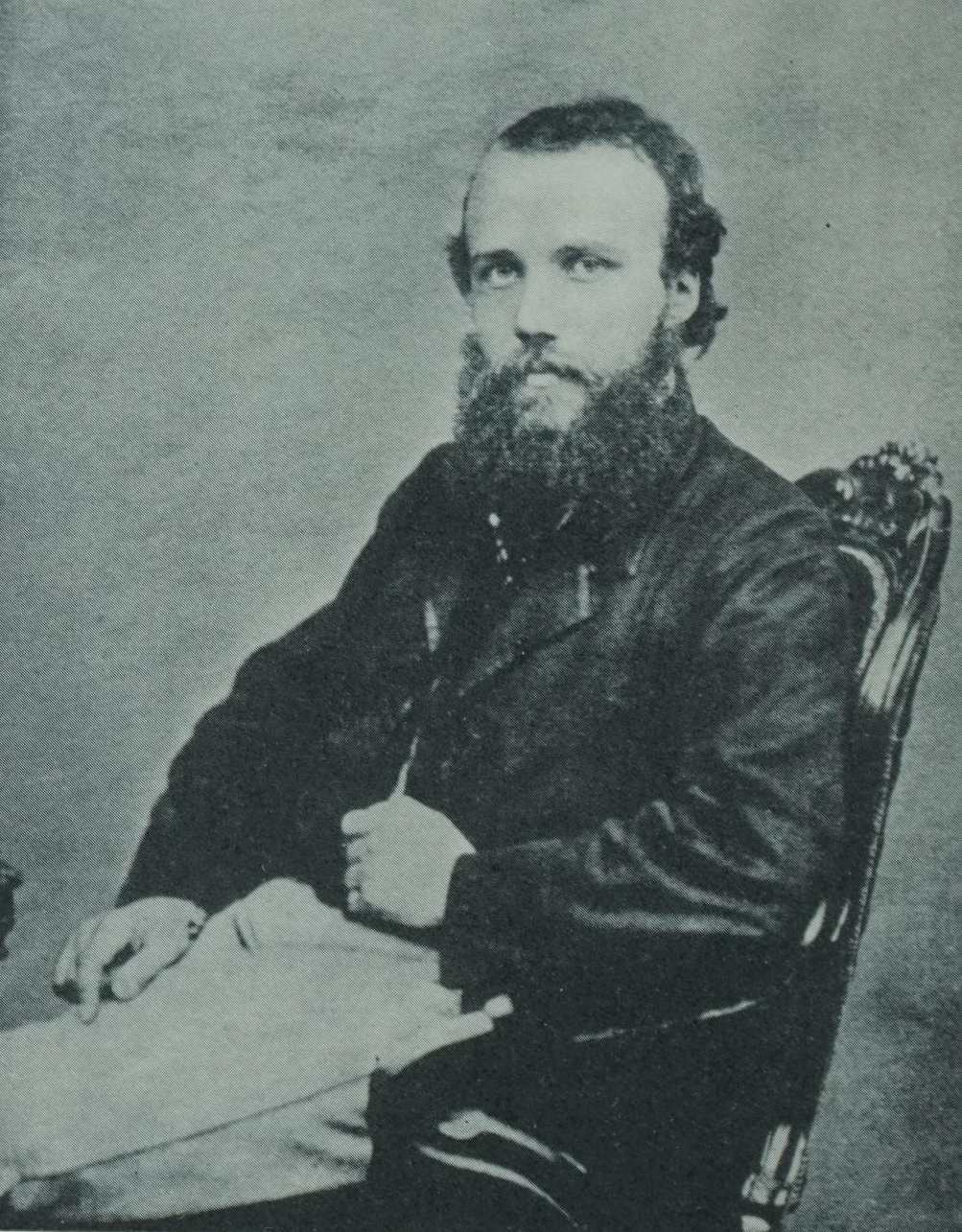

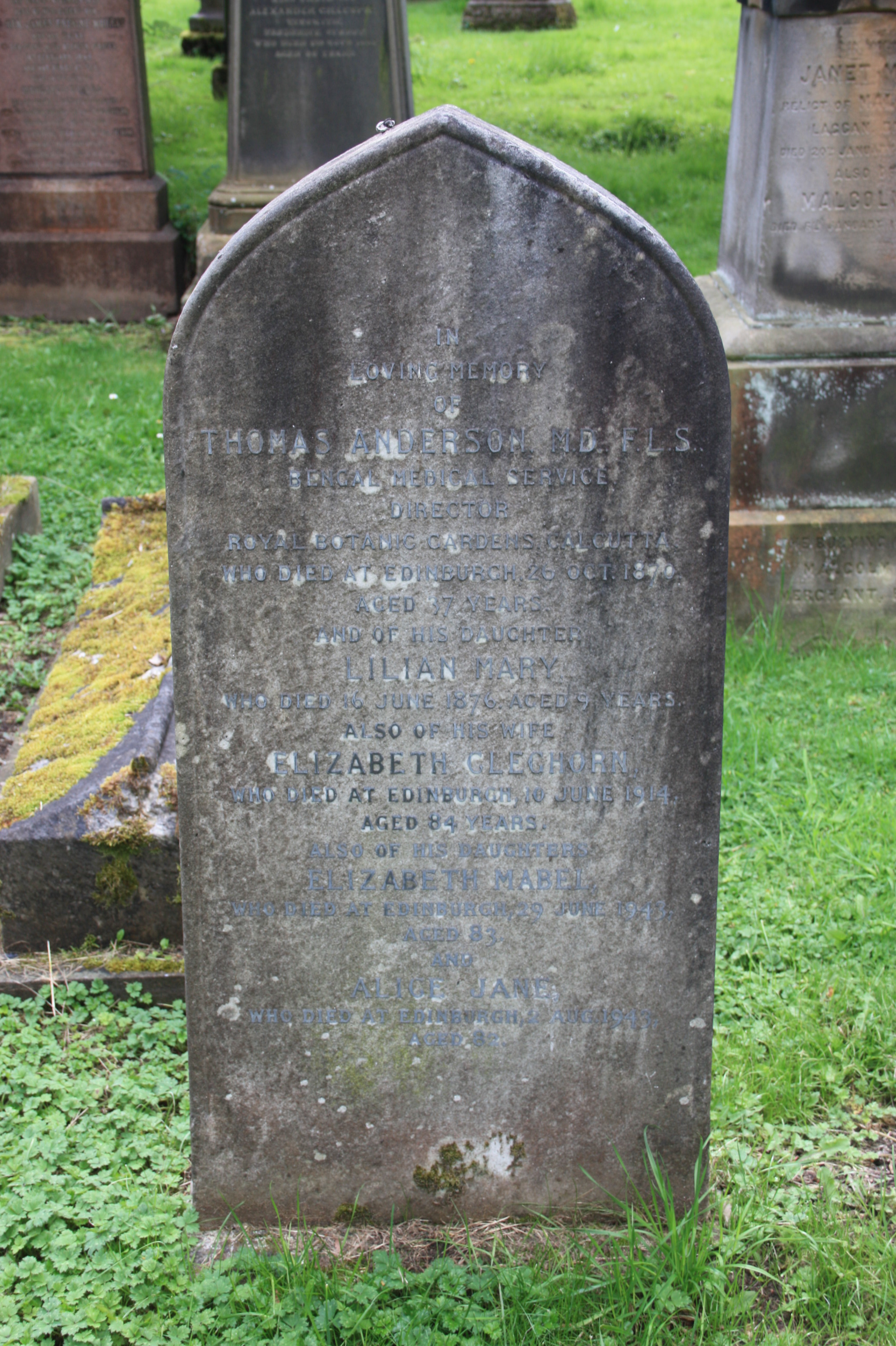
The grave of Thomas Anderson, Dean Cemetery, Edinburgh
