= List of plants of Atlantic Forest vegetation of Brazil =

A list of native plants found in the Atlantic Forest Biome of southeastern and southern Brazil. Additions occur as botanical discoveries and reclassifications are presented. They are grouped under their botanical Families.

== Acanthaceae ==
- Mendoncia velloziana Mart.
- Mendoncia puberula Mart.
- Aphelandra squarrosa Nees
- Aphelandra stephanophysa Nees
- Aphelandra rigida Glaz. et Mildbr.
- Justicia polita (Nees) Profice
- Justicia clausseniana (Nees) Profice
- Justicia nervata (Lindau) Profice

== Amaranthaceae ==
- Pfaffia pulverulenta (Mart.) Kuntze

== Amaryllidaceae ==
- Hippeastrum calyptratum Herb.

== Anacardiaceae ==
- Astronium fraxinifolium Schott
- Astronium graveolens Jacq.
- Tapirira guianensis Aubl.
- Schinus terebinthifolia G. Raddi

== Annonaceae ==
- Annona cacans Warm.
- Duguetia salicifolia R.E.Fr.
- Guatteria australis A.St.-Hil.
- Guatteria dusenii R.E.Fr.
- Guetteria nigrescens Mart.
- Rollinia laurifolia Schltdl.
- Rollinia sylvatica (A.St.-Hil.) Mart.
- Rollinia xylopiifolia (A.St.-Hil.) R.E.Fr.
- Xylopia brasiliensis Spreng.

== Apocynaceae ==
- Aspidosperma cylindrocarpon Müll.Arg.
- Aspidosperma melanocalyx Müll.Arg.
- Aspidosperma parvifolium A.DC.
- Forsteronia refracta Müll.Arg.
- Mandevilla funiformis (Vell.) K.Schum.
- Mandevilla pendula (Ule) Woodson
- Odontadenia lutea (Vell.) Markgr.
- Peschiera australis (Müll.Arg.) Miers

== Aquifoliaceae ==
- Ilex breviscupis Reissek
- Ilex integerrima Reissek
- Ilex microdonta Reissek
- Ilex paraguariensis A.St.-Hil.
- Ilex taubertiana Loes.
- Ilex theezans Mart.
- Ilex pubiflora Reissek

== Araceae ==
- Anthurium galeottii K.Koch.
- Anthurium harrisii G.Don
- Anthurium longifolium G.Don
- Anthurium lhotzkyanum Schott
- Anthurium scandens (Aubl.) Engl. subsp. scandens
- Anthurium solitarium Schott
- Anthurium theresiopolitanum Engl.
- Asterostigma luschnatianum Schott
- Philodendron appendiculatum Nadruz et Mayo
- Philodendron altomacaense Nadruz et Mayo
- Philodendron edmundoi G.M.Barroso
- Philodendron eximium Schott
- Philodendron fragile Nadruz et Mayo
- Philodendron hatschbachii Nadruz et Mayo
- Philodendron roseopetiolatum Nadruz et Mayo
- Philodendron ochrostemon Schott
- Philodendron ornatum Schott
- Philodendron propinquum Schott
- Xanthosoma sagittifolium (L.) Schott

== Araliaceae ==
- Didymopanax acuminatus Marchal
- Didymopanax angustissimus Marchal
- Oreopanax capitatus (Jacq.) Decne. et Planch.

== Araucariaceae ==
- Araucaria angustifolia (Bertol.) Kuntze

== Arecaceae ==
- Astrocaryum aculeatissimum (Schott) Burret
- Attalea dubia (Mart.) Burret
- Euterpe edulis Mart.
- Geonoma pohliana Mart.
- Geonoma wittigiana Glaz. ex Drude
- Lytocaryum hoehnei (Burret) Toledo
- Lytocaryum insigne (Drude) Toledo

== Asclepiadaceae ==
- Ditassa mucronata Mart.
- Gonioanthela hilariana (E.Fourn.) Malme
- Jobinia lindbergii E.Fourn.
- Jobinia hatschbachii Fontella et E.A.Schwarz
- Jobinia paranaensis Fontella et C.Valente
- Oxypetalum insigne var. glaziovii (E.Fourn.) Fontella et E. A.Schwarz
- Oxypetalum lutescens E.Fourn.
- Oxypetalum pachuglossum Decne.
- Macroditassa lagoensis (E.Fourn.) Malme
- Macroditassa laxa (Malme) Fontella et de Lamare
- Matelea glaziovii (E.Fourn.) Morillo

== Asteraceae ==
- Baccharis brachylaenoides DC. var. brachylaenoides
- Baccharis intermixta Gardner
- Baccharis microdonta DC.
- Baccharis semiserrata DC. var. semiserrata
- Baccharis trimera (Less.) DC.
- Dasyphyllum brasiliense (Spreng.) Cabrera
- Dasyphyllum spinescens (Less.) Cabrera
- Dasyphyllum tomentosum var. multiflorum (Baker) Cabrera
- Eupatorium adamantium Gardner
- Eupatorium pyrifolium DC.
- Eupatorium rufescens P.W.Lund. ex DC.
- Eupatorium vauthierianum DC.
- Gochnatia rotundifolia Less.
- Hatschbachiella polyclada (Dusén ex Malme) R.M.King & H.Rob.
- Mikania acuminata DC.
- Mikania aff. myriantha DC.
- Mikania argyreiae DC.
- Mikania buddleiaefolia DC.
- Mikania cabrerae G.M.Barroso
- Mikania chlorolepis Baker
- Mikania conferta Gardner
- Mikania glomerata Spreng.
- Mikania hirsutissima DC.
- Mikania lanuginosa DC.
- Mikania lindbergii Baker var. lindbergii
- Mikania lindbergii var. collina Baker
- Mikania microdonta DC.
- Mikania rufescens Sch. Bip. ex Baker
- Mikania trinervis Hook. et Arn.
- Mikania vitifolia DC.
- Mutisia speciosa Aiton ex. Hook.
- Piptocarpha macropoda (DC.) Baker
- Piptocarpha oblonga (Gardner) Baker
- Piptocarpha quadrangularis (Vell.) Baker
- Piptocarpha reitziana Cabrera
- Senecio brasiliensis (Spreng.) Less.
- Senecio desiderabilis Vell.
- Senecio glaziovii Baker
- Senecio organensis Casar.
- Symphyopappus itatiayensis R.M.King et H.Rob.
- Vanillosmopsis erythropappa (DC.) Sch.Bip.
- Vernonia aff. puberula Less.
- Vernonia diffusa Less.
- Vernonia discolor (Spreng.) Less.
- Vernonia macahensis Glaz. ex G.M.Barroso
- Vernonia macrophylla Less.
- Vernonia petiolaris DC.
- Vernonia puberula Less.
- Vernonia stellata (Spreng.) S.F.Blake
- Wunderlichia insignis Baill.

== Balanophoraceae ==
- Langsdorffia hipogaea Mart.
- Scybalium glaziovii Eichler

== Basellaceae ==
- Boussingaultia tucumanensis var. brasiliensis Hauman

== Begoniaceae ==
- Begonia angularis Raddi var. angularis
- Begonia arborescens Raddi
- Begonia coccinea Ruiz ex Klotzsch
- Begonia collaris Brade
- Begonia cucullata Willd. var. cucullata
- Begonia dentatiloba A.DC.
- Begonia digitata Raddi
- Begonia fischeri Schrank
- Begonia fruticosa A.DC.
- Begonia isoptera Dryand.
- Begonia herbacea Vell.
- Begonia hispida Schott ex A.DC. var. hispida
- Begonia hugelii Hort.Berol. ex A.DC.
- Begonia integerrima Spreng. var. integerrima
- Begonia lobata Schott
- Begonia semidigitata Brade
- Begonia paleata A.DC.
- Begonia pulchella Raddi
- Begonia solananthera A.DC.
- Begonia valdensium A.DC. var. valdensium

== Bignoniaceae ==
- Anemopaegma chamberlaynii (Sims) Bureau & K.Schum.
- Callichlamys latifolia (Rich.) K. Schum.
- Fridericia speciosa Mart.
- Haplolophium bracteatum Cham.
- Lundia corymbifera (Vahl) Sandwith
- Schlegelia parviflora (Oerst.) Monach.
- Stizophyllum perforatum (Cham.) Miers
- Tabebuia chrysotricha (Mart. ex A.DC.) Standl.
- Tabebuia heptaphylla (Vell.) Toledo
- Urbanolophium glaziovii (Bureau & K.Schum.) Melch.

== Bombacaceae ==
- Bombacopsis glabra (Pasq.) A.Robyns
- Chorisia speciosa A.St.-Hil. – Floss silk tree
- Eriotheca candolleana (K.Schum.) A.Robyns
- Spirotheca rivieri (Decne.) Ulbrich

== Boraginaceae ==
- Cordia ecalyculata Vell.
- Cordia ochnacea DC.
- Cordia sellowiana Cham.
- Cordia trichoclada DC.
- Tournefortia breviflora DC.

== Bromeliaceae ==
- Aechmea blanchetiana (Baker) L.B.Sm.
- Aechmea bromeliifolia (Rudge) Baker
- Aechmea caesia E.Morren ex Baker
- Aechmea pineliana (Brongn.ex Planch.) Baker var. pineliana
- Ananas ananassoides (Baker) L.B.Sm.
- Billbergia amoena var. rubra M.B.Foster
- Billbergia pyramidalis var. concolor L.B.Sm.
- Billbergia pyramidalis (Sims) var. pyramidalis Lindl.
- Billbergia sanderiana E.Morren
- Canistrum lindenii (Regel) Mez
- Neoregelia carolinae (Beer) L.B.Sm.
- Neoregelia bragarum (E.Pereira & L.B.Sm.) Leme
- Neoregelia farinosa (Ule) L.B.Sm.
- Neoregelia lymaniana R.Braga & Sucre
- Nidularium innocentii Lem. var. innocentii
- Nidularium microps E.Morren ex Mez var. microps
- Nidularium procerum Lindm.
- Nidularium scheremetiewii Regel
- Pitcairnia carinata Mez
- Pitcairnia flammea Lindl. var. flammea
- Quesnelia lateralis Wawra
- Quesnelia liboniana (De Jonghe) Mez
- Tillandsia aeris-incola (Mez) Mez
- Tillandsia geminiflora Brongn. var. geminiflora
- Tillandsia spiculosa Griseb. var. spiculiosa
- Tillandsia stricta Sol. ex Sims. var. stricta
- Tillandsia tenuifolia L. var. tenuifolia
- Vriesea bituminosa Wawra var. bituminosa
- Vriesea carinata Wawra
- Vriesea haematina L.B.Sm.
- Vriesea heterostachys (Baker) L.B.Sm.
- Vriesea hieroglyphica (Carrière) E.Morren var. hieroglyphica
- Vriesea hydrophora Ule
- Vriesea inflata (Wawra) Wawra
- Vriesea longicaulis (Baker) Mez
- Vriesea longiscapa Ule
- Vriesea paraibica Wawra
- Vriesea sparsiflora L.B.Sm.
- Vriesea vagans (L.B.Sm.) L.B.Sm.
- Wittrockia cyathiformis (Vell.) Leme
- Wittrockia flavipetala (Wand.) Leme & H.Luther
- Wittrockia gigantea (Baker) Leme
- Wittrockia superba Lindm.
- Wittrockia tenuisepala (Leme) Leme

== Cactaceae ==
- Hatiora salicornoides (Haw.) Britton & Rose
- Lepismium houlletianum (Lem.) Barthlott
- Rhipsalis capilliformes F.A.C.Weber
- Rhipsalis clavata F.A.C.Weber
- Rhipsalis elliptica G.Lindb. ex K.Schum.
- Rhipsalis floccosa Salm-Dyck ex Pfeiff.
- Rhipsalis houlletiana Lem.
- Rhipsalis trigona Pfeiff.
- Schlumbergera truncata (Haw.) Moran

== Campanulaceae ==
- Centropogon tortilis E.Wimm.
- Siphocampylus longepedunculatus Pohl

== Cannaceae ==
- Canna coccinea Mill.
- Canna paniculata Ruiz & Pav.

== Caprifoliaceae ==
- Lonicera japonica Thunb. ex Murray – Japanese Honeysuckle

== Celastraceae ==
- Celastrus racemosus Turcz.
- Maytenus brasiliensis Mart.
- Maytenus communis Reiss.

== Chloranthaceae ==
- Hedyosmum brasiliense Miq.

== Chrysobalanaceae ==
- Couepia venosa Prance
- Licania kunthiana Hook.f.

== Clethraceae ==
- Clethra scabra var. laevigata (Meisn.) Sleumer
- Cletha scabra Pers. var. scabra

== Clusiaceae ==
- Clusia criuva Cambess.
- Clusia fragrans Gardner
- Clusia lanceolata Cambess.
- Clusia marizii Gomes da Silva & Weinberg
- Clusia organensis Planch. & Triana
- Clusia studartiana C.M.Vieira & Gomes da Silva
- Kielmeyera insignis N.Saddi
- Rheedia gardneriana Planch. & Triana
- Tovomita glazioviana Engl.
- Tovomitopsis saldanhae Engl.

== Combretaceae ==
- Terminalia januarensis DC.

== Commelinaceae ==
- Dichorisandra thyrsiflora J.C.Mikan
- Tradescantia sp.

== Convolvulaceae ==
- Ipomoea demerariana Choisy (=Ipomoea phyllomega (Vell.) House)

== Cornaceae ==
- Griselina ruscifolia (Clos) Taub.

== Cucurbitaceae ==
- Anisosperma passiflora (Vell.) Silva Manso
- Apodanthera argentea Cogn.
- Cayaponia cf. tayuya (Vell.) Cogn.
- Melothria cucumis Vell. var. cucumis
- Melothrianthus smilacifolius (Cogn.) Mart. Crov.

== Cunoniaceae ==
- Lamanonia ternata Vell.
- Weinmannia paullinifolia Pohl ex Ser.

== Cyperaceae ==
- Pleurostachys densefoliata H.Pfeiff.
- Pleurostachys millegrana (Nees) Steud.
- Rhynchospora exaltata Kunth
- Scleria panicoides Kunth

== Dichapetalaceae ==
- Stephanopodium organense (Rizzini) Prance

== Dioscoreaceae ==
- Dioscorea subhastata Vell.
- Hyperocarpa filiformes (Griseb.) G.M.Barroso, E.F.Guim. & Sucre

== Elaeocarpaceae ==
- Sloanea monosperma Vell.

== Ericaceae ==
- Gaultheria eriophylla (Pers.) Sleumer ex B.L.Burtt
- Gaylussacia aff. fasciculata Gardner
- Gaylussacia brasiliensis (Spreng.) Meisn.

== Erythroxylaceae ==
- Erythroxylum citrifolium A.St.-Hil.
- Erythroxylum cuspidifolium Mart.

== Euphorbiaceae ==
- Alchornea triplinervia (Spreng.) Müll.Arg.
- Croton floribundus Spreng.
- Croton organensis Baill.
- Croton salutaris Casar.
- Fragariopsis scandens A.St.-Hil.
- Hieronyma alchorneoides Allemão
- Pera obovata (Klotzsch) Baill.
- Phyllanthus glaziovii Müll.Arg.
- Sapium glandulatum Pax
- Tetrorchidium parvulum Müll.Arg.

== Fabaceae: Caesalpinioideae ==
- Bauhinia microstachya (Raddi) J.F.Macbr.
- Copaifera trapezifolia Hayne
- Sclerolobium beaurepairei Harms, synonym of Tachigali beaurepairei
- Sclerolobium friburgense Harms
- Sclerolobium rugosum Mart. ex Benth.
- Senna macranthera (DC. ex Collad.) H.S.Irwin & Barneby var. macranthera
- Senna multijuga var. lindleyana (Gardner) H.S.Irwin & Barneby
- Tachigali paratyensis (Vell.) H.C. Lima (= Tachigali multijuga Benth.).

=== Fabaceae: Faboideae ===
- Andira fraxinifolia Benth.
- Camptosema spectabile (Tul.) Burkart
- Crotalaria vitellina var. laeta (Mart. ex Benth.) Windler & S. Skinner
- Dalbergia foliolosa Benth.
- Dalbergia frutescens (Vell.) Britton
- Dalbergia glaziovii Harms
- Dalbergia lateriflora Benth.
- Dioclea schottii Benth.
- Erythrina falcata Benth.
- Lonchocarpus glaziovii Taub.
- Machaerium cantarellianum Hoehne
- Machaerium gracile Benth.
- Machaerium nyctitans (Vell.) Benth.
- Machaerium oblongifolium Vogel
- Machaerium reticulatum (Poir.) Pers.
- Machaerium triste Vogel
- Myrocarpus frondosus Allemão
- Ormosia fastigiata Tul.
- Ormosia friburgensis Glaz.
- Pterocarpus rohrii Vahl
- Swartzia myrtifolia var. elegans (Schott) R. S. Cowan
- Zollernia glaziovii Yakovlev
- Zollernia ilicifolia (Brongn.) Vogel

=== Fabaceae: Mimosoideae ===
- Abarema langsdorfii (Benth.) Barneby & Grimes
- Acacia lacerans Benth.
- Acacia martiusiana (Steud.) Burkart
- Calliandra tweediei Benth.
- Inga barbata Benth.
- Inga cylindrica (Vell.) Mart.
- Inga dulcis (Vell.) Mart.
- Inga lancifolia Benth.
- Inga lenticellata Benth.
- Inga lentiscifolia Benth.
- Inga leptantha Benth.
- Inga marginata Willd. = Inga semialata (Vell.) Mart.
- Inga mendoncaei Harms = Inga organensis Pittier
- Inga platyptera Benth.
- Inga sessilis (Vell.) Mart.
- Mimosa extensa Benth.
- Piptadenia gonoacantha (Mart.) J. F. Macbr.
- Piptadenia micracantha Benth.

== Gentianaceae ==
- Macrocarpaea glaziovii Gilg

== Gesneriaceae ==
- Besleria fasciculata Wawra
- Besleria macahensis Brade
- Besleria melancholica (Vell.) C. V. Morton
- Codonanthe cordifolia Chautems
- Codonanthe gracilis (Mart.) Hanst.
- Nematanthus crassifolius subsp. chloronema (Mart.) Chautems
- Nematanthus hirtellus (Schott) Wiehler
- Nematanthus lanceolatus (Poir.) Chautems
- Nematanthus serpens (Vell.) Chautems
- Sinningia cooperi (Paxt.) Wiehler
- Sinningia incarnata (Aubl.) D. L. Denham
- Vanhouttea fruticulosa (Hoehne) Chautems

== Hippocrateaceae ==
- Cheiloclinium neglectum A.C.Sm.
- Hippocratea volubilis L.
- Salacia amygdalina Peyr.
- Tontelea leptophylla A.C.Sm.

== Humiriaceae ==
- Humiriastrum glaziovii (Urb.) Cuatrec. var. glaziovii
- Humiriastrum glaziovii var. angustifolium Cuatrec.
- Vantanea compacta (Schnizl.) Cuatrec. subsp. compacta var. compacta
- Vantanea compactasubsp. compacta var. grandiflora (Urb.) Cuatrec.

== Icacinaceae ==
- Citronella paniculata (Mart.) R.A.Howard

== Labiatae ==
- Salvia rivularis Gardner
- Scutellaria uliginosa A.St.-Hil. ex Benth.

== Lacistemataceae ==
- Lacistema pubescens Mart.

== Lauraceae ==
- Aniba firmula (Nees et Mart.) Mez
- Beilschmiedia fluminensis Kosterm.
- Beilschmiedia rigida (Mez) Kosterm.
- Cinnamomum glaziovii (Mez) Kosterm.
- Cinnamomum riedelianum Kosterm.
- Cryptocarya micrantha Meisn.
- Cryptocarya moschata Nees et Mart. ex Nees
- Endlicheria paniculata (Spreng.) J.F.Macbr.
- Nectandra leucantha Nees
- Nectandra oppositifolia Nees
- Nectandra puberula (Schott) Nees
- Ocotea acypahilla (Nees) Mez
- Ocotea catharinensis Mez
- Ocotea diospyrifolia (Meisn.) Mez
- Ocotea dispersa (Nees) Mez
- Ocotea divaricata (Nees) Mez
- Ocotea domatiata Mez
- Ocotea glaziovii Mez
- Ocotea indecora (Schott) Mez
- Ocotea teleiandra (Meisn.) Mez
- Ocotea notata (Nees) Mez
- Ocotea odorifera (Vell.) Rohwer
- Ocotea porosa (Nees) Barroso
- Ocotea puberula (Rich.) Nees
- Ocotea pulchra Vattimo-Gil
- Ocotea silvestris Vattimo-Gil
- Ocotea spixiana (Nees) Mez
- Ocotea tabacifolia Meisn.) Rohwer
- Ocotea urbaniana Mez
- Ocotea vaccinioides Meisn.
- Persea fulva Koop var. fulva
- Persea willdenovii Kosterm.
- Rhodostemonodaphne macrocalyx (Meisn.) Rohwer ex Madriñán

== Lecythidaceae ==
- Cariniana estrellensis (Raddi) Kuntze

== Lentibulariaceae ==
- Utricularia geminiloba Benj.

== Lobeliaceae ==
- Lobelia thapsoidea Schott

== Loganiaceae ==
- Spigelia macrophylla (Pohl) DC.

== Loranthaceae ==
- Phoradendron crassifolium (Pohl & DC.) Eichler
- Phoradendron warmingii var. rugulosum (Urb.) Rizzini
- Psittacanthus flavo-viridis Eichler
- Psittacanthus pluricotyledonarius Rizzini
- Psittacanthus robustus (Mart.) Mart.
- Struthanthus concinnus Mart.
- Struthanthus marginatus (Desr.) Blume
- Struthanthus salicifolius (Mart.) Mart.
- Struthanthus syringaefolius (Mart.) Mart.

== Magnoliaceae ==
- Magnolia Magnolia ovata (A.St.-Hil.) Spreng.

== Malpighiaceae ==
- Banisteriopsis membranifolia (A. Juss.) B. Gates
- Byrsonima laevigata (Poir.) DC.
- Byrsonima laxiflora Griseb.
- Byrsonima myricifolia Griseb.
- Heteropteris anomala A. Juss. var. anomala
- Heteropteris leschenaultiana A. Juss.
- Heteropteris nitida (Lam.) DC.
- Heteropteris sericea (Cav.) A. Juss. var. sericea
- Hiraea gaudichaudiana (A. Juss.) A. Jsss.
- Stigmaphyllon gayanum A. Juss
- Tetrapterys crebiflora A. Juss.
- Tetrapterys lalandiana A. Juss.
- Tetrapterys lucida A. Juss.

== Malvaceae ==
- Abutilon rufirnerve A.St.-Hil. var. rufirnerve

== Marantaceae ==
- Stromanthe sanguinea Sond.

== Marcgraviaceae ==
- Marcgravia polyantha Delpino
- Norantea cuneifolia (Gardner) Delpino

== Melastomataceae ==
- Behuria glazioviana Cogn.
- Behuria mouraei Cogn.
- Bertolonia grazielae Baumgratz
- Bertolonia sanguinea var. santos-limae (Brade) Baumgratz
- Bisglaziovia behurioides Cogn.
- Clidemia octona (Bonpl.) L. Wms.
- Henriettella glabra (Vell.) Cogn.
- Huberia glazioviana Cogn.
- Huberia minor Cogn.
- Huberia parvifolia Cogn.
- Huberia triplinervis Cogn.
- Leandra acutiflora (Naudin) Cogn.
- Leandra amplexicaulis DC.
- Leandra aspera Cogn.
- Leandra atroviridis Cogn.
- Leandra aurea (Cham.) Cogn.
- Leandra breviflora Cogn.
- Leandra carassanae (DC.) Cogn.
- Leandra confusa Cogn.
- Leandra dasytricha (A.Gray) Cogn.
- Leandra eriocalyx Cogn.
- Leandra fallax (Cham.) Cogn.
- Leandra foveolata (DC.) Cogn.
- Leandra fragilis Cogn.
- Leandra gracilis var. glazioviana Cogn.
- Leandra hirta Raddi
- Leandra hirtella Cogn.
- Leandra laevigata (Triana) Cogn.
- Leandra laxa Cogn.
- Leandra magdalenensis Brade
- Leandra melastomoides Raddi
- Leandra mollis Cogn.
- Leandra multiplinervis (Naudin) Cogn.
- Leandra multisetosa Cogn.
- Leandra neurotricha Cogn.
- Leandra nianga Cogn.
- Leandra nutans Cogn.
- Leandra purpurascens Cogn.
- Leandra quinquedentata (DC.) Cogn.
- Leandra schwackei Cogn.
- Leandra sphaerocarpa Cogn.
- Leandra tetragona Cogn.
- Leandra trauninensis Cogn.
- Leandra xanthocoma (Naudin.) Cogn.
- Leandra xanthostachya Cogn.
- Marcetia taxifolia (A.St.-Hil.) DC.
- Meriania claussenii Triana
- Meriania robusta Cogn.
- Miconia altissima Cogn.
- Miconia argyrea Cogn.
- Miconia augustii Cogn.
- Miconia brasiliensis (Spreng.) Triana
- Miconia brunnea DC.
- Miconia budlejoides Triana
- Miconia chartacea Triana
- Miconia cinnamomifolia (DC.) Naudin
- Miconia depauperata Gardner
- Miconia dichroa Cogn.
- Miconia divaricata Gardner
- Miconia doriana Cogn.
- Miconia fasciculata Gardner
- Miconia formosa Cogn.
- Miconia gilva Cogn.
- Miconia glazioviana Cogn.
- Miconia jucunda (DC.) Triana
- Miconia latecrenata (DC.) Naudin
- Miconia longicuspis Cogn.
- Miconia octopetala Cogn.
- Miconia organensis Gardner
- Miconia ovalifolia Cogn.
- Miconia molesta Cogn.
- Miconia paniculata (DC.) Naudin
- Miconia paulensis Naudin
- Miconia penduliflora Cogn.
- Miconia prasina (Sw.) DC.
- Miconia pseudo-eichlerii Cogn.
- Miconia pusilliflora (DC.) Naudin
- Miconia rabenii Cogn.
- Miconia saldanhaei var. grandiflora Cogn.
- Miconia sellowiana Naudin
- Miconia staminea (Desr.) DC.
- Miconia subvernicosa Cogn.
- Miconia theaezans (Bonpl.) Cogn.
- Miconia tristis Spring
- Miconia urophylla DC.
- Miconia willdenowii Klotzsch ex Naudin
- Mouriri arborea Gardner
- Mouriri chamissoana Cogn.
- Mouriri doriana Cogn.
- Ossaea angustifolia (DC.) Triana var. brevifolia Cogn.
- Ossaea brachystachya (DC.) Triana
- Ossaea confertiflora (DC.) Triana
- Pleiochiton micranthum Cogn.
- Pleiochiton parvifolium Cogn.
- Pleiochiton roseum Cogn.
- Pleiochiton setulosum Cogn.
- Pleroma semidecandrum (Schrank & Mart. ex DC.) Triana (syn. Tibouchina semidecandra)
- Tibouchina alba Cogn.
- Tibouchina arborea (Gardner) Cogn.
- Tibouchina benthamiana var. punicea Cogn.
- Tibouchina canescens (D.Don) Cogn.
- Tibouchina estrellensis (Raddi) Cogn.
- Tibouchina fissinervia (DC.) Cogn.
- Tibouchina imperatoris Cogn.
- Tibouchina moricandiana (DC.) Baill.
- Tibouchina nervulosa Cogn.
- Tibouchina ovata Cogn.
- Tibouchina petroniana Cogn.
- Tibouchina saldanhaei Cogn.
- Tibouchina schwackei Cogn.
- Trembleya parviflora (D.Don.) Cogn.

== Meliaceae ==
- Cabralea canjerana (Vell.) Mart. subsp. canjerana
- Cedrela odorata L.
- Guarea macrophylla subsp. tuberculata (Vell.) T.D.Penn.
- Trichilia casaretti C.DC.
- Trichilia emarginata (Turcz.) C.DC.

== Menispermaceae ==
- Abuta selloana Eichler
- Chondodendron platyphyllum (A.St.-Hil.) Miers

== Monimiaceae ==
- Macropeplus ligustrinus var. friburgensis Perkins
- Mollinedia acutissima Perkins
- Mollinedia argyrogyna Perkins
- Mollinedia engleriana Perkins
- Mollinedia fasciculata Perkins
- Mollinedia gilgiana Perkins
- Mollinedia glaziovii Perkins
- Mollinedia longicuspidata Perkins
- Mollinedia lowtheriana Perkins
- Mollinedia marliae Peixoto & V.Pereira
- Mollinedia myriantha Perkins
- Mollinedia oligantha Perkins
- Mollinedia pachysandra Perkins
- Mollinedia salicifolia Perkins
- Mollinedia schottiana (Spreng.) Perkins
- Mollinedia stenoplylla Perkins
- Siparuna chlorantha Perkins

== Moraceae ==
- Cecropia cf.lyratiloba Miq.
- Cecropia glaziovii Snethl.
- Cecropia hololeuca Miq.
- Coussapoa microcarpa (Schott) Rizzini
- Ficus luschnathiana (Miq.) Miq.
- Ficus organensis (Miq.) Miq.
- Ficus trigona L.f.
- Sorocea bonplandii (Baill.) W.C.Burger & Alii

== Myristicaceae ==
- Virola gardneri (A.DC.) Warb.

== Myrsinaceae ==
- Cybianthus brasiliensis (Mez) G.Agostini
- Cybianthus glaber A.DC.
- Rapanea acuminata Mez
- Rapanea ferruginea (Ruiz & Pav.) Mez
- Rapanea guianensis Aubl.
- Rapanea lancifolia Mez
- Rapanea schwackeana Mez
- Rapanea umbellata (Mart.) Mez

== Myrtaceae ==
- Calycorectes schottianus O.Berg
- Calyptranthes concinna DC.
- Calyptranthes glazioviana Kiaersk.
- Calyptranthes lucida Mart. ex DC.
- Calyptranthes obovata Kiaersk.
- Campomanesia guaviroba (DC.) Kiaersk.
- Campomanesia laurifolia Gardner
- Eugenia cambucarana Kiaersk.
- Eugenia cuprea (O.Berg) Nied.
- Eugenia curvato-petiolata Kiaersk.
- Eugenia ellipsoidea Kiaersk.
- Eugenia gracillima Kiaersk.
- Eugenia stictosepala Kiaersk.
- Eugenia subavenia O.Berg
- Marlierea Marlierea aff.teuscheriana (O. Berg.) D. Legrand
- Marlierea mar 'tinelii G. M. Barroso & Peixoto
- Marlierea silvatica (Gardner) Kiaersk.
- Marlierea suaveolens Cambess.
- Myrceugenia kleinii D.Legrand & Kausel
- Myrceugenia pilotantha (Kiaersk.) Landrum
- Myrceugenia scutellata D. Legrand
- Myrcia anacardiifolia Gardner
- Myrcia coelosepala Kiaersk.
- Myrcia fallax (Rich.) DC.
- Myrcia fenzliana O.Berg
- Myrcia glabra (O.Berg) D.Legrand
- Myrcia glazioviana Kiaersk.
- Myrcia guajavifolia O.Berg
- Myrcia laruotteana Cambess.
- Myrcia lineata (O. Berg) G. M. Barroso & Peixoto
- Myrcia longipes (O. Berg) Kiaersk.
- Myrcia multiflora (Lam.) DC.
- Myrcia pubipetala Miq.
- Myrcia rhabdoides Kiaersk.
- Myrcia rufula Miq.
- Myrcia spectabilis DC.
- Myrcia tomentosa (Aubl.) DC.
- Myrcia warmingiana Kiaersk.
- Myrciaria floribunda (H. West. ex Willd.) O. Berg –Guavaberry
- Myrciaria tenella (DC.) O. Berg
- Pimenta pseudocaryophyllus var. fulvescens (DC.) Landrum
- Plinia martinellii G. M. Barroso & M. Peron
- Psidium guineense Sw.
- Psidium Psidium robustum O. Berg
- Psidium spathulatum Mattos
- Siphoneugena densiflora O. Berg
- Siphoneugena kiaerskoviana (Burret) Kausel

== Nyctaginaceae ==
- Guapira opposita (Vell.) Reitz

== Ochnaceae ==
- Luxemburgia glazioviana Beauverd
- Ouratea parviflora (DC.) Baill.
- Ouratea vaccinioides (A.St.-Hil.) Engl.

== Olacaceae ==
- Heisteria silvianii Schwacke

== Oleaceae ==
- Linociera micrantha Mart.

== Onagraceae ==
- Fuchsia glazioviana Taub.
- Fuchsia regia subsp. serrae P.E.Berry

== Orchidaceae ==
- Barbosella porschii (Kraenzl.) Schltr.
- Beadlea warmingii (Rchb.f.) Garay
- Chytroglossa marileoniae Rchb.f.
- Dichaea pendula (Aubl.) Cogn.
- Epidendrum addae Pabst
- Epidendrum paranaense Barb.Rodr.
- Epidendrum saxatile Lindl.
- Epidendrum xanthinum Lindl.
- Gomesa recurva Lodd.
- Maxillaria cerifera Barb.Rodr.
- Maxillaria ubatubana var. mantiqueirana Hoehne
- Miltonia cuneata Lindl.
- Oncidium cf.hookeri Rolfe
- Oncidium uniflorum Booth ex Lindl.
- Pabstia jugosa (Lindl.) Garay
- Pabstia triptera (Rolfe) Garay
- Phymatidium aquinoi Schltr.
- Phymatidium delicatulum Lindl.
- Phymatidium falcifolium Lindl.
- Phymatidium tillandsoides Barb.Rodr.
- Pleurothallis aff.hamosa Barb.Rodr.
- Pleurothallis trifida Lindl.
- Prescottia epiphyta Barb.Rodr.
- Rodrigueziopsis microphyta (Barb.Rodr.) Schltr.
- Scaphyglottis modesta (Rchb.f.) Schltr.
- Sophronitis aff.grandiflora Lindl.
- Sophronitis aff.mantiqueirae (Fowlie) Fowlie
- Zygopetalum crinitum Lodd.
- Zygopetalum triste Barb.Rodr.

== Passifloraceae ==
- Passiflora actinia Hook.
- Passiflora alata Dryand.
- Passiflora amethystina J.C.Mikan
- Passiflora deidamioides Harms
- Passiflora odontophylla Harms ex Glaz.
- Passiflora organensis Gardner
- Passiflora rhamnifolia Mast.
- Passiflora speciosa Gardner
- Passiflora vellozii Gardner

== Phytolaccaceae ==
- Phytolacca thyrsiflora Fenzl ex J.A.Schmidt.
- Seguieria langsdorffii Moq.

== Piperaceae ==
- Ottonia diversifolia Kunth
- Peperomia alata Ruiz & Pav.
- Peperomia corcovadensis Gardner
- Peperomia glabella (Sw.) A. Dietr.
- Peperomia lyman-smithii Yunck.
- Peperomia rhombea Ruiz & Pav.
- Peperomia rotundifolia (L.) H. B. & K.
- Peperomia tetraphylla (G. Forst.) Hook. & Arn.
- Piper aequilaterum C. DC.
- Piper caldense C. DC.
- Piper chimonanthifolium Kunth
- Piper gaudichaudianum Kunth
- Piper glabratum Kunth
- Piper hillianum C. DC.
- Piper lhotzkyanum Kunth
- Piper malacophyllum (C. Presl) C. DC.
- Piper permucronatum Yunck.
- Piper pseudopothifolium C. DC.
- Piper richardiifolium Kunth
- Piper tectonifolium Kunth
- Piper translucens Yunck.
- Piper truncatum Vell.

== Poaceae ==
- Chusquea aff. oxylepis (Hack.) Ekman
- Chusquea aff. tenella Nees
- Chusquea anelytroides Rupr. ex Döll
- Chusquea capitata Nees
- Chusquea capituliflora Trin.
- Guadua tagoara (Nees) Kunth
- Merostachys aff. ternata Nees
- Merostachys fischeriana Rupr. ex Döll

== Podocarpaceae ==
- Podocarpus lambertii Klotzsch ex Endl.
- Podocarpus sellowii Klotzsch ex Endl.

== Polygalaceae ==
- Polygala laureola A.St.-Hil. & Moq.
- Polygala oxyphylla DC.
- Securidaca macrocarpa A.W.Benn.

== Polygonaceae ==
- Ruprechtia laxiflora Meisn.

== Proteaceae ==
- Roupala consimilis Mez
- Roupala longepetiolata Pohl
- Roupala rhombifolia Mart. ex Meisn.
- Roupala warmingii Meisn.

== Quiinaceae ==
- Quiina glaziovii Engl.

== Ranunculaceae ==
- Clematis dioica var. australis Eichler
- Clematis dioica var. brasiliana (DC.) Eichler

== Rosaceae ==
- Prunus brasiliensis Schott ex Spreng.
- Rubus urticaefolius Poir.

== Rubiaceae ==
- Alibertia longiflora K.Schum.
- Amaioua intermedia Mart.
- Bathysa australis (A.St.-Hil.) Benth. & Hook.f.
- Bathysa cuspidata (A.St.-Hil.) Hook.f.
- Bathysa mendocaei K.Schum.
- Chomelia brasiliana
- Chomelia estrellana Müll.Arg.
- Coccocypselum lanceolatum (Ruiz & Pav.) Pers.
- Coccocypselum sessiliflorum Standl.
- Coussarea congestiflora Müll.Arg.
- Coussarea friburgensis M. Gomes
- Coussarea speciosa K.Schum. ex. Glaz.
- Coutarea hexandra (Jacq.) K.Schum.
- Diodia alataNees & Mart.
- Emmeorrhiza umbellata (Spreng.) K.Schum.
- Faramea dichotoma K.Schum. ex M.Gomes
- Faramea multiflora var. salicifolia (C. Presl.) Steyerm.
- Faramea urophylla Müll.Arg.
- Galium hypocarpium subsp. indecorum (Cham. & Schltdl.) Dempster
- Hillia parasitica Jacq.
- Hindsia longiflora (Cham.) Benth.
- Hoffmannia duseniiStandl.
- Ixora brevifolia Benth.
- Manettia beyrichiana K.Schum.
- Manettia congesta (Vell.) K.Schum.
- Manettia fimbriata Cham. & Schltdl.
- Manettia mitis (Vell.) K. Schum.
- Posoqueria acutifolia Mart.
- Posoqueria latifolia (Rudge) Roem. & Schult.
- Psychotria alto-macahensis M.Gomes
- Psychotria appendiculata Müll.Arg.
- Psychotria brachyanthema Standl.
- Psychotria caudata M.Gomes
- Psychotria constricta Müll.Arg.
- Psychotria leiocarpa Cham. & Schltdl.
- Psychotria nemerosa Gardner
- Psychotria nitidula Cham. & Schltdl.
- Psychotria pallens Gardner
- Psychotria pubigera Schltdl.
- Psychotria ruelliifolia (Cham. & Schltdl.) Müll.Arg.
- Psychotria stachyoides Benth.
- Psychotria suterella Müll.Arg.
- Psychotria ulei Standl.
- Psychotria vellosiana Benth.
- Randia armata (Sw.) DC.
- Rudgea corniculata Benth.
- Rudgea gardenoides (Cham.) Müll.Arg.
- Rudgea eugenioides Standl.
- Rudgea insignis Müll.Arg.
- Rudgea jasminoides (Cham.) Müll.Arg.
- Rudgea leiocarpoides Müll.Arg.
- Rudgea nobilis Müll.Arg.
- Rudgea recurva Müll.Arg.
- Rustia gracilis K.Schum.
- Tocoyena sellowiana (Cham. & Schltdl.) K.Schum.

== Rutaceae ==
- Dictyoloma incanescens DC.
- Zanthoxylum rhoifolium Lam. (= Fagara rhoifolia (Lam.) Engl.)

== Sabiaceae ==
- Meliosma brasiliensis Urb.
- Meliosma sellowii Urb.

== Salicaceae ==
- Casearia arborea (Rich.) Urb.
- Casearia decandra Jacq.
- Casearia obliqua Spreng.
- Casearia pauciflora Cambess.
- Casearia sylvestris Sw.
- Xylosma ciliatifolia (Clos) Eichler
- Xylosma prockia (Turcz.) Turcz.

== Sapindaceae ==
- Allophylus edulis (A.St.-Hil.) Radlk.
- Cupania emarginata Cambess.
- Cupania oblongifolia Mart.
- Cupania racemosa (Vell.) Radlk.
- Cupania zanthoxyloides Cambess.
- Matayba guianensis Aubl.
- Paullinia carpopoda Cambess.
- Paullinia meliaefolia Juss.
- Paullinia trigonia Vell.
- Serjania communis Cambess. var. communis
- Serjania elegans Cambess.
- Serjania gracilis Radlk.
- Serjania laruotteana Cambess.
- Serjania lethalis A.St.-Hil.
- Serjania noxia Cambess.
- Serjania reticulata Cambess.
- Thinouia scandens (Cambess.) Triana & Planch.

== Sapotaceae ==
- Chrysophyllum imperiale
- Chrysophyllum viride Martius & Eichler
- Micropholis compta Pierre
- Micropholis crassipedicellata (Mart. & Eichl.) Pierre
- Pouteria guianensis Aubl.
- Pouteria microstrigosa T.D.Penn.
- Pouteria macahensis T.D.Penn.

== Scrophulariaceae ==
- Velloziella dracocephaloides Baill.

== Simaroubaceae ==
- Picramnia glazioviana Engl. subsp. glazioviana
- Simarouba amara Aubl.

== Smilacaceae ==
- Smilax japicanga Griseb.
- Smilax quinquenervia Vell.
- Smilax spicata Vell.
- Smilax staminea Griseb.

== Solanaceae ==
- Acnistus arborescens (L.) Schltdl.
- Athenaea anonacea Sendtn.
- Athenaea picta (Mart.) Sendtn.
- Aureliana brasiliana (Hunz.) Barboza & Hunz.
- Aureliana fasciculata (Vell.) Sendtn. var. fasciculata
- Brunfelsia brasiliensis (Spreng.) L.B.Sm. & Downs var. brasiliensis
- Brunfelsia hydrangaeformis (Pohl) Benth. subsp. hydrangaefomis
- Capsicum campylopodium Sendtn.
- Cestrum lanceolatum Miers var. lanceolatum
- Cestrum aff.sessiliflorum Schott ex Sendtn.
- Cestrum stipulatum Vell.
- Cyphomandra calycina Sendtn.
- Dyssochroma viridiflora (Sims) Miers
- Sessea regnellii Taub.
- Solanum aff.schizandrum Sendtn.
- Solanum argenteum Dunal
- Solanum caeruleum Vell.
- Solanum cinnamomeum Sendtn.
- Solanum decorum Sendtn. var. decorum
- Solanum granuloso-leprosum Dunal
- Solanum inaequale Vell.
- Solanum inodorum Vell.
- Solanum leucodendron Sendtn.
- Solanum megalochiton var. villoso-tomentosum Dunal
- Solanum odoriferum Vell.
- Solanum stipulatum Vell.
- Solanum swartzianum Roem. & Schult. var. swartzianum
- Solanum undulatum Dunal

== Symplocaceae ==
- Symplocos celastrinea Mart. ex Miq.
- Symplocos crenata (Vell.) Mattos
- Symplocos glandulosomarginata Hoehne
- Symplocos nitidiflora Brand.
- Symplocos tertandra Mart. ex Miq.
- Symplocos uniflora (Pohl) ex Benth.

== Theaceae ==
- Laplacea fruticosa (Schrad.) Kobuski

== Thymelaeaceae ==
- Daphnopsis martii Meisn.
- Daphnopsis utilis Warm.

== Tiliaceae ==
- Luehea divaricata Mart.

== Umbelliferae ==
- Hydrocotyle leucocephala Cham. & Schltdl.

== Valerianaceae ==
- Valeriana scandens L.

== Verbenaceae ==
- Aegiphila fluminensis Vell.
- Aegiphila obducta Vell.
- Aegiphila sellowiana Cham.

== Violaceae ==
- Anchietea pyrifolia (Mart.) G.Don var. pyrifolia

== Vitaceae ==
- Cissus pulcherrima Vell.
- Cissus sulcicaulis (Baker) Planch.

== Vochysiaceae ==
- Vochysia dasyantha Warm.
- Vochysia glazioviana Warm.
- Vochysia magnifica Warm.
- Vochysia oppugnata (Vell.) Warm.
- Vochysia rectiflora var. glabrescens Warm.
- Vochysia saldanhana Warm.
- Vochysia schwackeana Warm.
- Vochysia spathulata Warm.
- Vochysia tucanorum Mart.

== Winteraceae ==
- Drimys brasiliensis Miers

== Zingiberaceae ==
- Hedychium coronarium J.König

== See also ==
- Ecoregions of the Atlantic Forest biome
- Official list of endangered flora of Brazil
- List of plants of Amazon Rainforest vegetation of Brazil
- List of plants of Caatinga vegetation of Brazil
- List of plants of Cerrado vegetation of Brazil
- List of plants of Pantanal vegetation of Brazil
