= Justicia nervata =

Scientific classification
- Kingdom: Plantae
- Clade: Tracheophytes
- Clade: Angiosperms
- Clade: Eudicots
- Clade: Asterids
- Order: Lamiales
- Family: Acanthaceae
- Genus: Justicia
- Species: J. nervata

Binomial name
- Justicia nervata (Lindau) Profice (1996)

Synonyms
- Jacobinia nervata Lindau (1895)

Species of flowering plant

Justicia nervata is a shrub native to the Atlantic Forest vegetation of Brazil.

== See also ==
- List of plants of Atlantic Forest vegetation of Brazil
