= Justicia clausseniana =

Scientific classification
- Kingdom: Plantae
- Clade: Tracheophytes
- Clade: Angiosperms
- Clade: Eudicots
- Clade: Asterids
- Order: Lamiales
- Family: Acanthaceae
- Genus: Justicia
- Species: J. clausseniana

Binomial name
- Justicia clausseniana (Nees) Profice

Synonyms
- Sericographis clausseniana Nees (1847)

Species of flowering plant

Justicia clausseniana is a flowering perennial plant in the family Acanthaceae. It is native to the Atlantic Forest ecoregions of eastern Brazil. It was first published in Reserva Ecol. Macaé de Cima: Aspectos Flor. Espéc. Vasc. 2: 31 (1996).

== Description ==
The leaves are phyllotaxy opposite, decussate, the petiole is smaller or equal to 3 mm in length, and the blade is lanceolate. The inflorescence is either axillary or terminal, the bracts are obovate, and the bracts color is green. The flowers calyx is five in number, lobate with lobes, subequal, hair at the calyx is simple and short, the corolla lip lower flattened, length of the tube of the corolla bigger than the size total of the calyx ( usually 3/4 of the length of the corolla ), the upper lip of the corolla oblong, color of the lobes are internally red, color of the palate internally either white or red, and the two thecas are fertile and muticus. The fruit are capsules.

== See also ==
- List of plants of Atlantic Forest vegetation of Brazil
- Ecoregions of the Atlantic Forest biome
