= De Lamare =

de Lamare is a surname. Notable people with this surname include:

- Abelardo de Lamare (1892–1979), Brazilian footballer
- Emile Janne de Lamare, mining engineer and author
- Jacques-Michel Hurel de Lamare (1772–1823), French cellist
- Rinaldo de Lamare (1910–2002), Brazilian physician
- Rolando de Lamare (1888–1963), Brazilian footballer
