= Philodendron fragile =

Scientific classification
- Kingdom: Plantae
- Clade: Tracheophytes
- Clade: Angiosperms
- Clade: Monocots
- Order: Alismatales
- Family: Araceae
- Genus: Philodendron
- Species: P. fragile

Binomial name
- Philodendron fragile Nadruz & Mayo

Species of plant

Philodendron fragile is a species of plant in the family Araceae that is native to Brazil. It is a hemi-epiphyte that is critically endangered and can be found only in the Macaé de Cima Environmental Protection Area.

== Description ==
Philodendron fragile is a hemi-epiphytic vine that flowers from October to January and fruits from January to February.

New stem growth is pale green in color, while the mature stem is greenish-grey. The prophyll is 20 centimeters long by 5 cm wide, is triangular in shape and pale cream in color. The petioles are 17–27 cm long. The leaf blade is 15–37 cm long and 9–24 cm wide, with an egg-like to triangular shape, a pointed tip, and a somewhat heart-shaped base. The leaf is much paler on the underside and has a papery texture.

On each main axis (sympodium) there is one to two flower clusters. The sheathing bract around the flower clusters is around 11.5 cm long, and is greenish on the outside, cream colored on the blade, and greenish inside the tube with a hint of light red near the base. The stamens are 0.15–0.25 cm long by 0.1–0.2 cm wide; the gynoecium is roughly the same size but slightly smaller, and green to pale green in color.

Philodendron fragile is most similar in appearance to P. hatschbachii and P. millerianum, which have the same kind of leaf shape. It differs from them in its straight inflorescence and its weakly constricted sheathing bract. It can be differentiated from other species in Philodendron by the smaller ratio of the length of the posterior to anterior leaf blade divisions.

== Taxonomy ==
The first time the species was collected for scientific purposes was in 1992. It was described as Philodendron fragile by botanists Marcus Nadruz and Simon Mayo in 1998. The species was assigned to section Macrobelium with Central American species, subsection Macrobelium with 19 other Brazilian species, and series Ecordata based on its leaf shape.

== Distribution, habitat, and conservation ==
Philodendron fragile is endemic to the Macaé de Cima Environmental Protection Area in Rio de Janeiro, Brazil. It is hemi-epiphytic and grows in humid, shady places. The species is found in the Atlantic Forest at elevations of around 900 meters.

Philodendron fragile was assessed as Critically Endangered by a Kew Bulletin publication in 2005. It is known from an area of less than 100 square kilometers, and has only been found in its type locality, where it is rare. While some of the species' subpopulations are protected in the Macaé de Cima, it is still highly threatened as a whole.
