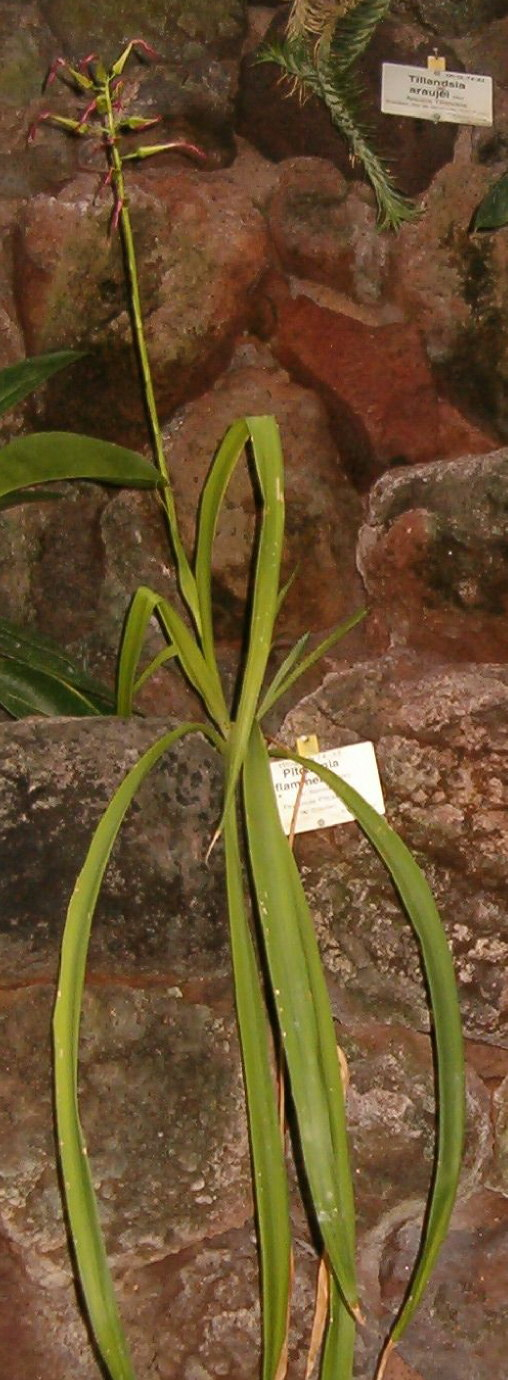

Scientific classification
- Kingdom: Plantae
- Clade: Tracheophytes
- Clade: Angiosperms
- Clade: Monocots
- Clade: Commelinids
- Order: Poales
- Family: Bromeliaceae
- Genus: Pitcairnia
- Species: P. flammea

Binomial name
- Pitcairnia flammea Lindley

= Pitcairnia flammea =

Species of flowering plant

Pitcairnia flammea is a species of flowering plant in the family Bromeliaceae. This species is endemic to Brazil.
