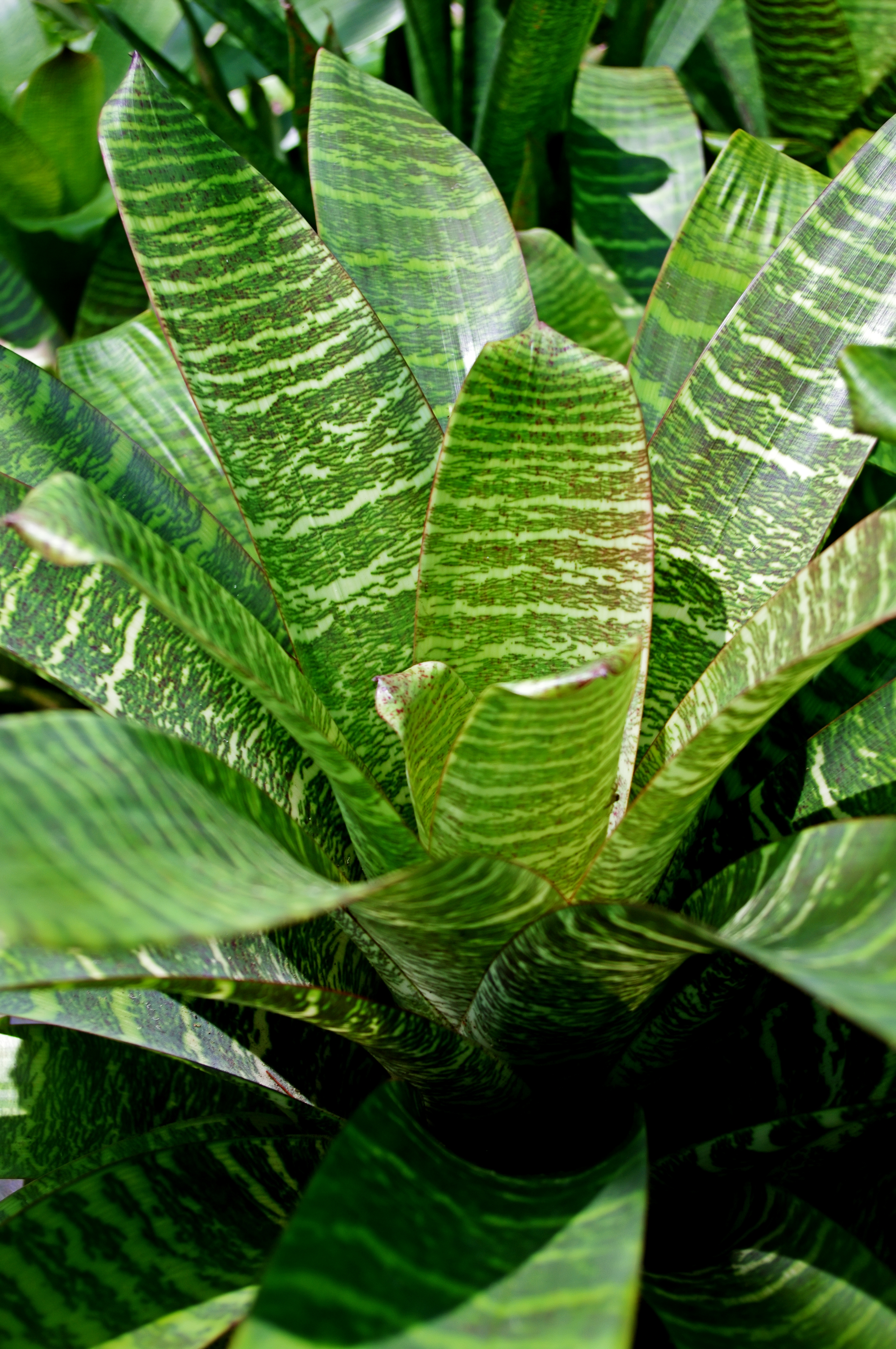

Scientific classification
- Kingdom: Plantae
- Clade: Tracheophytes
- Clade: Angiosperms
- Clade: Monocots
- Clade: Commelinids
- Order: Poales
- Family: Bromeliaceae
- Genus: Vriesea
- Species: V. hieroglyphica

Binomial name
- Vriesea hieroglyphica (Carrière) É.Morren

= Vriesea hieroglyphica =

Species of flowering plant

Vriesea hieroglyphica is a plant species in the genus Vriesea.

The name refers to the linear horizontal patterns on the leaves that resemble hieroglyphs. It has been nicknamed "King of the bromeliads."

== Distribution ==
This bromeliad species is endemic to southeastern Brazil.

It grows at low altitudes in humid conditions under the shade of trees in the Atlantic Forest biome (Mata Atlantica Brasileira).

== Description ==
Vriesea hieroglyphica develops green leaves with irregular dark cross banding and recurved tips. The plant develops 30-40 shiny, bright green leaves measuring 3 feet (0.91 m) long and 3 inches wide.

It typically blooms in spring, and can bloom repeatedly in cultivation, with branching yellow, cream, or white flowers on a tall branched spike. The tall, light green flower spike "bears a branched inflorescence with 1-inch-long, pale green bracts and dull yellow-petaled flowers."

The variety Vriesea hieroglyphica var. Marginata has broad cream−ivory colored bands on the leaves.

== Cultivation ==
The distinctive leaf markings make Vriesea hieroglyphica a popular ornamental plant cultivated for gardening and commercial floristry uses, including as an interior landscape−house plants, potted outdoor plants, and planted in gardens in suitable climates.

Outdoors it can be grown from light to full shade, and is rated for USDA Zone 10 (min 30 °F) and up. Indoors, it is usually grown with a northern exposure and assured humidity.

=== Cultivars and hybrids ===
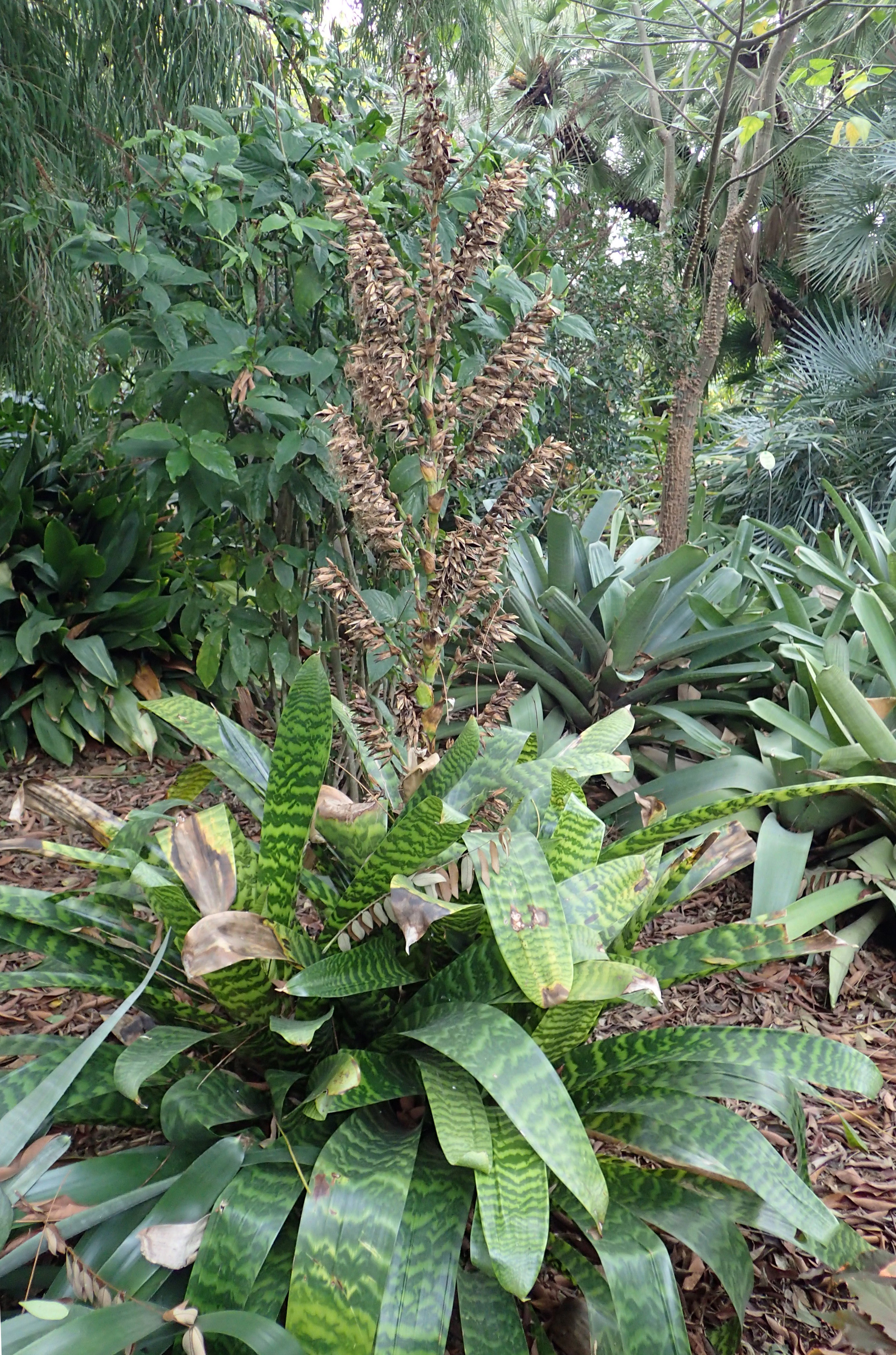
Cultivated plants blooming in the Jardín de Aclimatación de La Orotava, Tenerife.

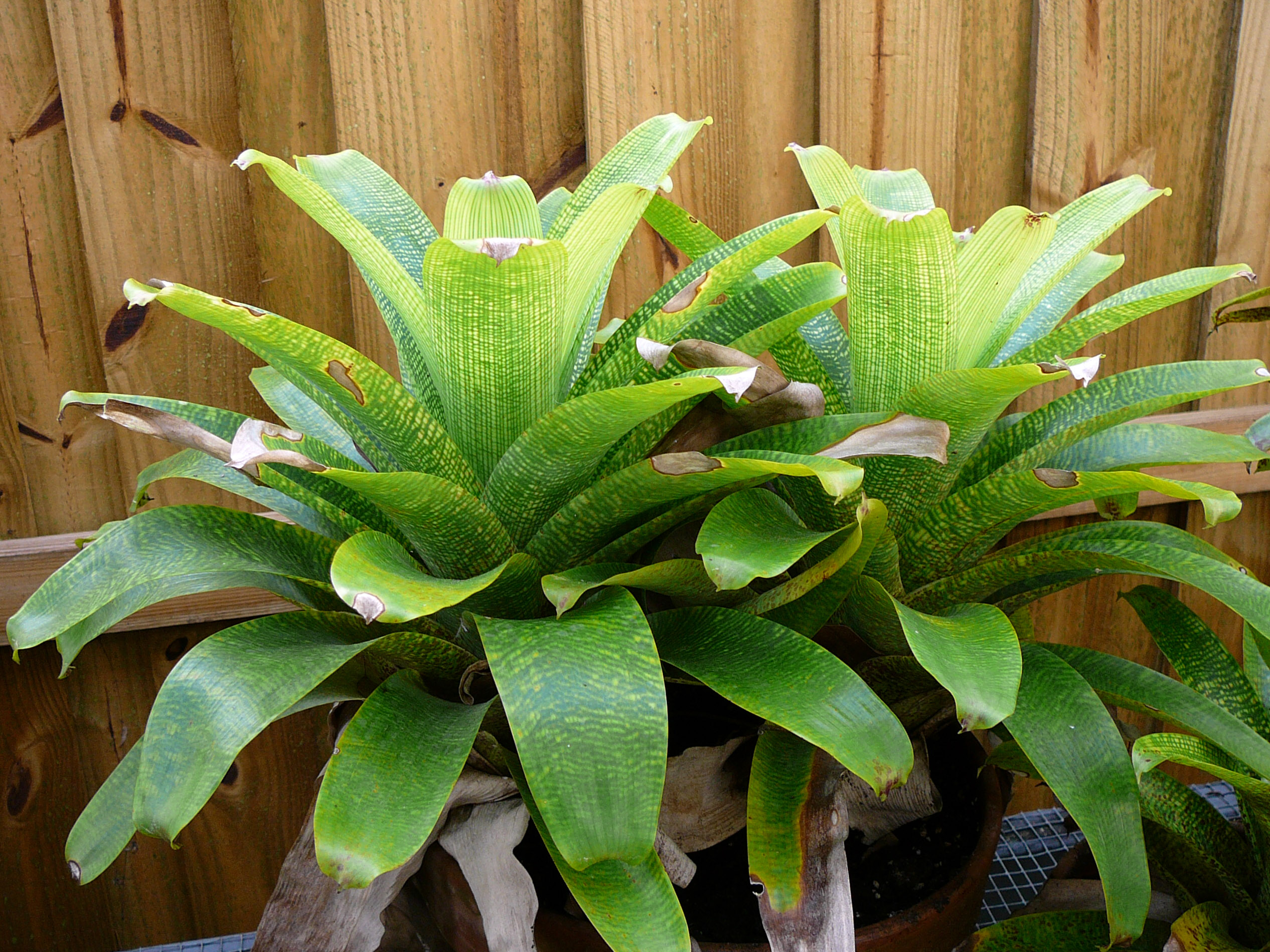
Vriesea hieroglyphica grown in garden pots.

Garden cultivars of Vriesea hieroglyphica, and hybrids with other Vriesea species, include:

- Vriesea 'After Glow'
- Vriesea 'El Supremo'
- Vriesea 'Elvira'
- Vriesea 'Gigant Jade'
- Vriesea 'Glossy Girl'
- Vriesea 'Grand Purple'
- Vriesea 'Hawaiian Sunrise'
- Vriesea 'Intermedia'
- Vriesea 'Jungle Jade'
- Vriesea 'Leverett's Delight'
- Vriesea 'Machu Picchu'
- Vriesea 'Madame Morobe'
- Vriesea 'Maureen'
- Vriesea 'Montezuma's Gem'
- Vriesea 'Pamela Leaver'
- Vriesea 'Patrice'
- Vriesea 'Shizuko Murakami'
- Vriesea 'Yellow Wave'
- Vriesea 'You Beaut'
