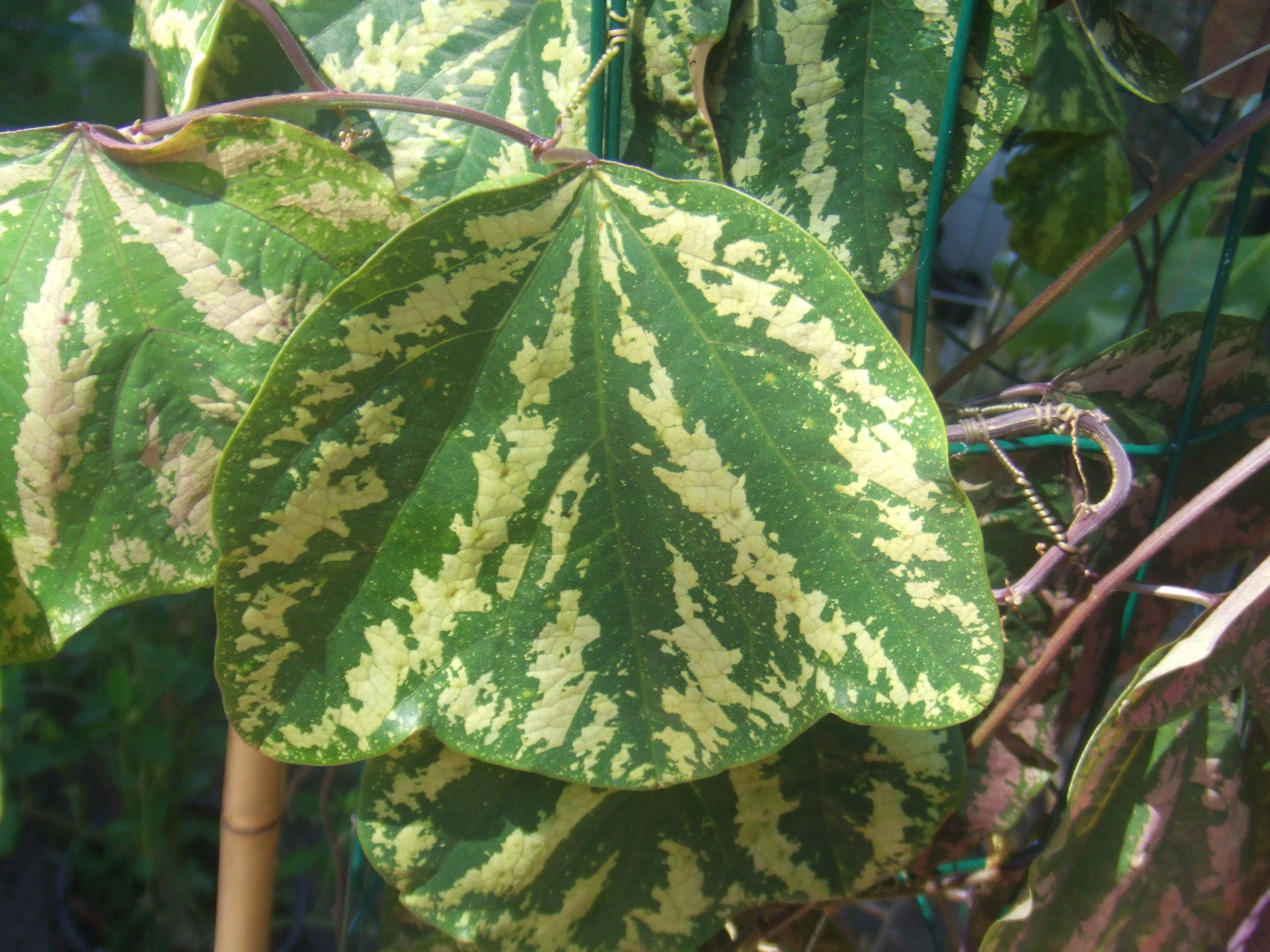
- A variegated cultivar.

Scientific classification
- Kingdom: Plantae
- Clade: Tracheophytes
- Clade: Angiosperms
- Clade: Eudicots
- Clade: Rosids
- Order: Malpighiales
- Family: Passifloraceae
- Genus: Passiflora
- Species: P. porophylla

Binomial name
- Passiflora porophylla Vell.

Synonyms
- Passiflora organensis Gardner

= Passiflora porophylla =

Species of plant

Passiflora porophylla is a evergreen vine of the passion flower family (Passifloraceae). It is native to eastern Brazil.

Its leaves are two- or three-lobed, very variable in size but wider than they are long, 2–12.2 centimetres (0.79–4.80 in) long and 3.6–16.6 centimetres (1.4–6.5 in) wide, green above, often vinous-glaucous beneath. In some cultivars, the leaves can be marked with bold pale or dark purple markings.
