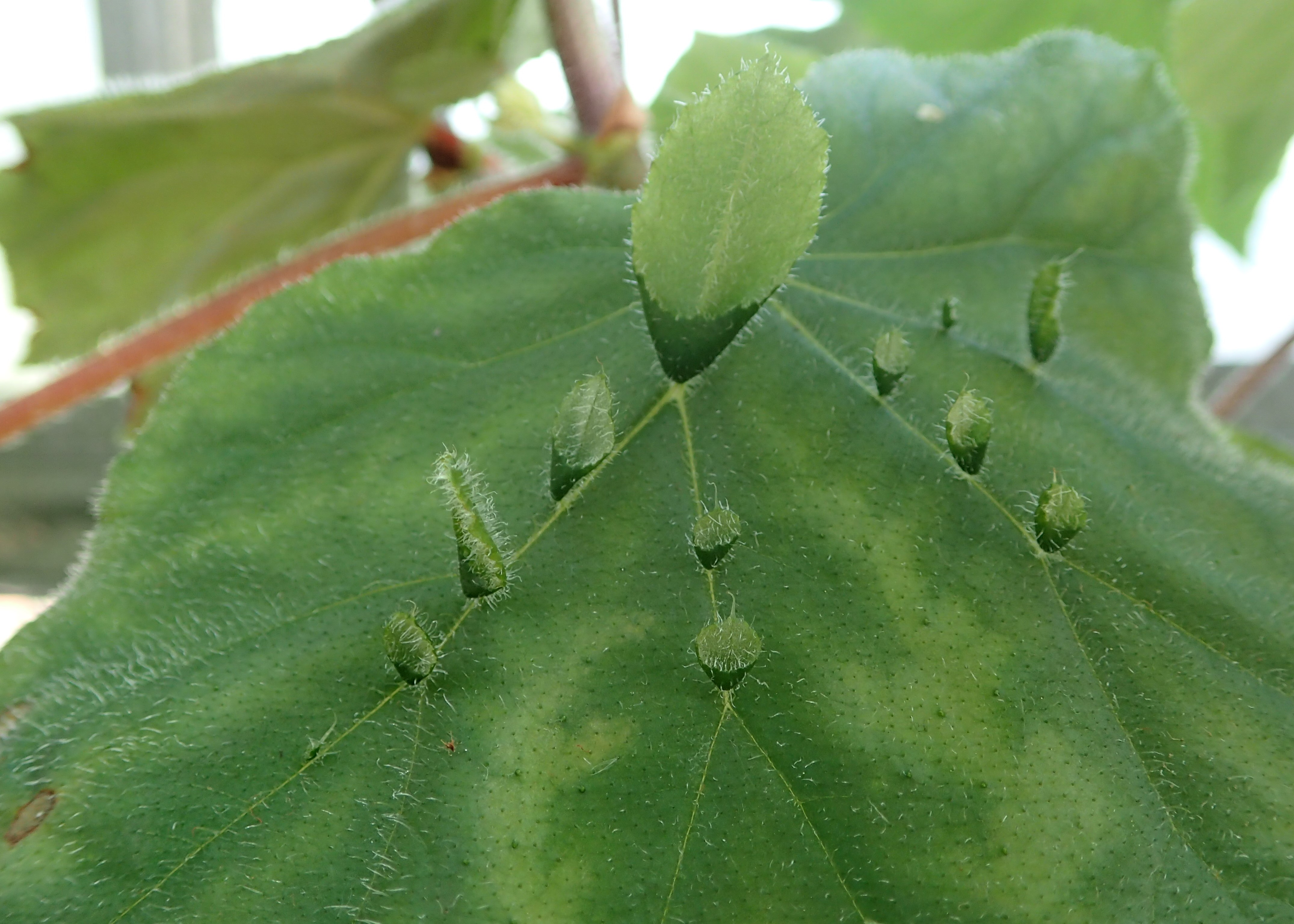
- Leaflets of putative variety B. hispida var. cucullifera
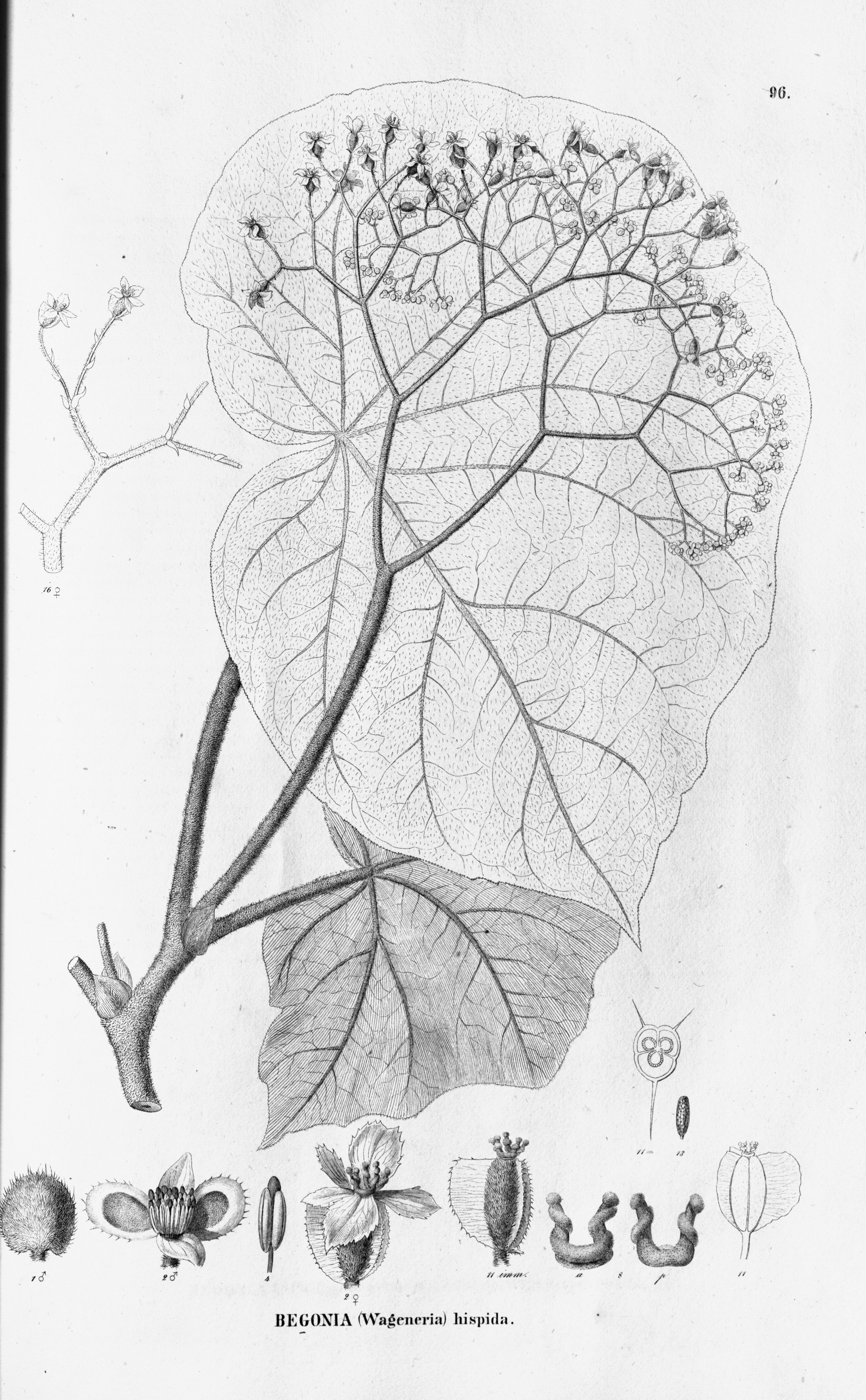
- Botanical illustration

Scientific classification
- Kingdom: Plantae
- Clade: Tracheophytes
- Clade: Angiosperms
- Clade: Eudicots
- Clade: Rosids
- Order: Cucurbitales
- Family: Begoniaceae
- Genus: Begonia
- Species: B. hispida

Binomial name
- Begonia hispida Schott ex A.DC.

Synonyms
- Begonia hispida var. cucullifera Irmsch.

= Begonia hispida =

Species of flowering plant

Begonia hispida, the piggyback begonia (a name only applied to individuals with leaflets), is a species of flowering plant in the family Begoniaceae, native to southeastern and southern Brazil. They are occasionally cultivated due to their "piggyback" leaflets which grow directly from veins in the main leaves. The piggyback mutation is also seen in Arabidopsis.
