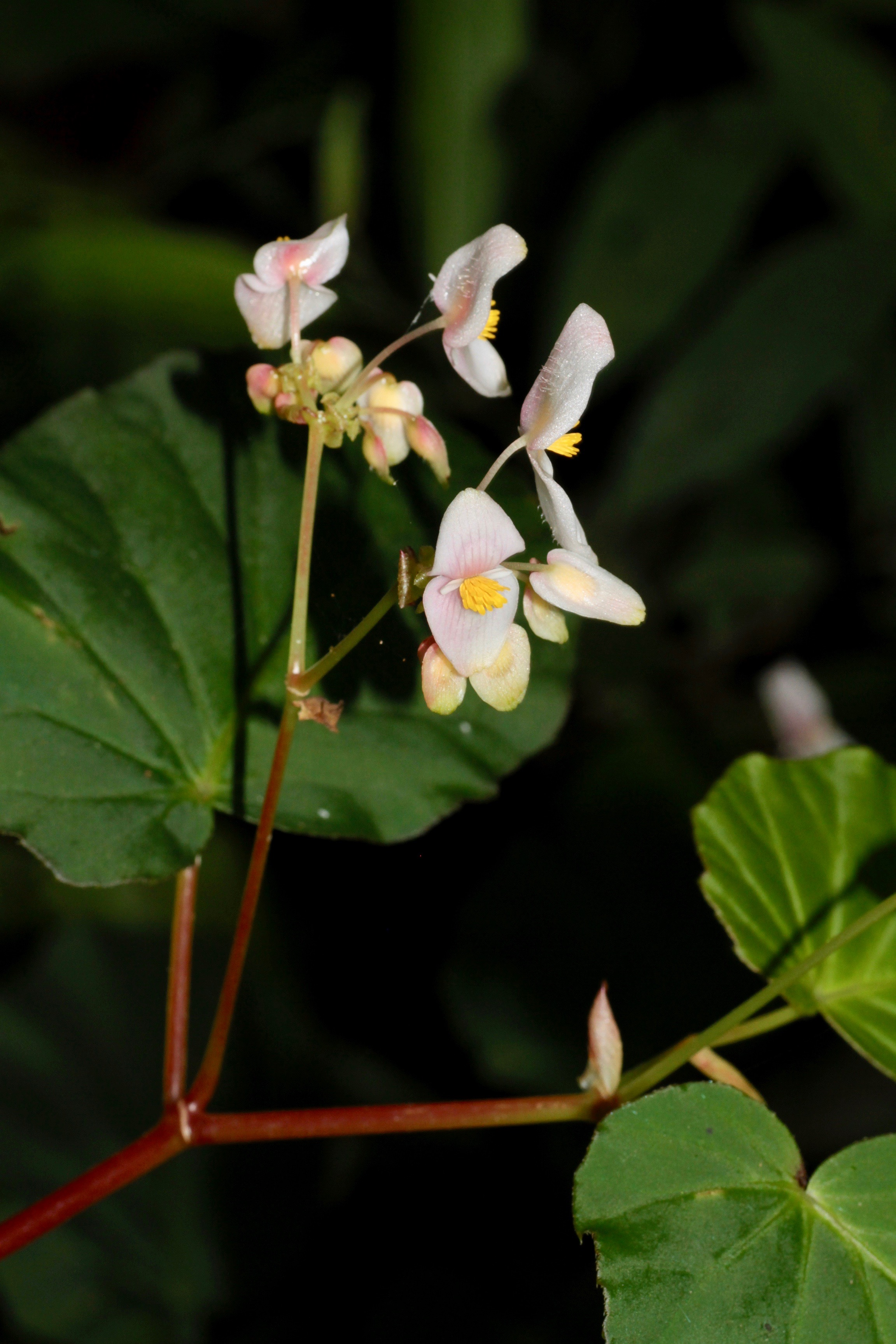

Conservation status
- Least Concern (IUCN 3.1)

Scientific classification
- Kingdom: Plantae
- Clade: Tracheophytes
- Clade: Angiosperms
- Clade: Eudicots
- Clade: Rosids
- Order: Cucurbitales
- Family: Begoniaceae
- Genus: Begonia
- Species: B. fischeri

Binomial name
- Begonia fischeri Schrank

Synonyms
- List: Begonia fischeri var. eufischeri Irmsch.; Begonia patula Fisch. ex Hornem.; Begonia brasiliensis Klotsch; Begonia ciliibracteola C.DC.; Begonia dubia Haw.; Begonia elata Klotzsch; Begonia ermanii Klotzsch; Begonia fischeri var. brasiliensis (Klotzsch) Irmsch.; Begonia fischeri var brevipilosa Irmsch.; Begonia fischeri var crenatoglabra Irmsch.; Begonia fischeri var crenulatoglabra Irmsch.; Begonia fischeri var elata (Klotzsch) Irmsch.; Begonia fischeri var ermanii (Klotzsch) Irmsch.; Begonia fischeri var klugii Irmsch.; Begonia fischeri var macroptera (Klotzsch) Irmsch.; Begonia fischeri var malvacea (Klotzsch) Irmsch.; Begonia fischeri var moritziana (Klotzsch) Irmsch.; Begonia fischeri var palustris (Hartw. ex Benth.) Irmsch.; Begonia fischeri var tovarensis (Klotzsch) Irmsch.; Begonia hassleri C.DC.; Begonia intercedens Irmsch.; Begonia kaietukensis Tutin; Begonia macroptera Klotzsch; Begonia macroptera var paludum A.DC.; Begonia macroptera var pohliana (Klotzsch) A.DC.; Begonia malvacea Klotzsch; Begonia moritziana Klotzsch; Begonia palustris Hartw. ex Benth.; Begonia parvifolia Klotzsch; Begonia pauciflora Lindl.; Begonia pohliana Klotzsch; Begonia populifolia Klotzsch; Begonia roraimensis Tutin; Begonia setosa Klotzsch; Begonia tovarensis Klotzsch; Begonia tovarensis var ocanensis A.DC.; Begonia tovarensis var palustris (Hartw. ex Benth.) L.B.Sm. & B.G.Schub.; Begonia ulei D.DC.; Begonia uliginosa Schott ex Klotzsch; Begonia uliginosa var ermanii (Klotzsch) A.DC.; Begonia vellerea Klotzsch; Begonia villosa Gardner

= Begonia fischeri =

Species of flowering plant

Begonia fischeri, commonly called Fischer's begonia, is a species of flowering plant in the family Begoniaceae, native to Mexico, Central America and much of South America. It is a hardy perennial herb with a shrub-like growth habit.

== Distribution and habitat ==
Begonia fischeri is native to Argentina, Bolivia, Brazil, Colombia, Costa Rica, Ecuador, El Salvador, Guatemala, Guyana, Honduras, Jamaica, Mexico, Nicaragua, Panama, Peru, and Venezuela. It is also native to Cuba where it is considered regionally extinct.

== Description ==
Begonia fischeri has flowers ranging from white to pink that grow to about 0.75 inches (19 mm) inches wide. The leaves are alternate, and it will flower all year in the right conditions.
