= De Jonghe =

De Jonghe may refer to:

== Middle name ==
- Georges-Marie de Jonghe d'Ardoye (1887–1961), Belgian prelate
- Louis-Marie de Jonghe d'Ardoye (born 1888), Belgian equestrian

== Surname ==
- Gustave Léonard de Jonghe (1829–1893), Flemish painter
- Jan Baptiste de Jonghe (1785–1844), Belgian painter
- Jimmy De Jonghe (born 1992), Belgian footballer
- Kevin De Jonghe (born 1991), Belgian cyclist
