= Solanum leucodendron =

Conservation status
- Conservation Dependent (IUCN 2.3)

Scientific classification
- Kingdom: Plantae
- Clade: Tracheophytes
- Clade: Angiosperms
- Clade: Eudicots
- Clade: Asterids
- Order: Solanales
- Family: Solanaceae
- Genus: Solanum
- Species: S. leucodendron

Binomial name
- Solanum leucodendron Sendt.

Species of flowering plant

Solanum leucodendron is a species of plant in the family Solanaceae. The plant is endemic to the Atlantic Forest ecoregion in southeastern Brazil.
