= Vriesea longicaulis =

Scientific classification
- Kingdom: Plantae
- Clade: Tracheophytes
- Clade: Angiosperms
- Clade: Monocots
- Clade: Commelinids
- Order: Poales
- Family: Bromeliaceae
- Genus: Vriesea
- Species: V. longicaulis

Binomial name
- Vriesea longicaulis (Baker) Mez

Synonyms
- Tillandsia longicaulis Baker

Species of flowering plant

Vriesea longicaulis is a species of flowering plant in the Bromeliaceae family. This bromeliad is endemic to the Atlantic Forest biome (Mata Atlantica Brasileira), located in southeastern Brazil.
