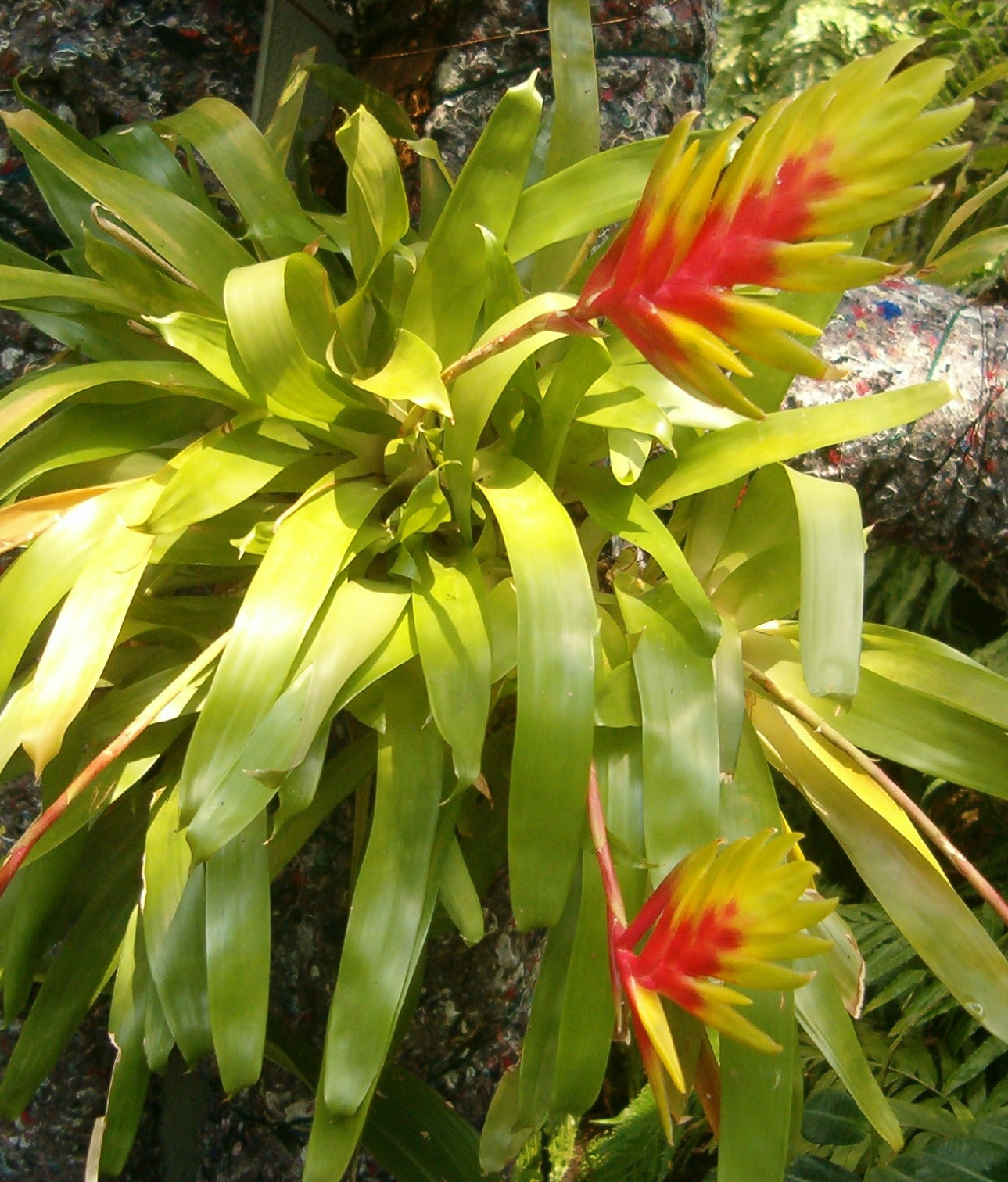
- At Botanical Gardens Berlin-Dahlem

Scientific classification
- Kingdom: Plantae
- Clade: Tracheophytes
- Clade: Angiosperms
- Clade: Monocots
- Clade: Commelinids
- Order: Poales
- Family: Bromeliaceae
- Genus: Vriesea
- Species: V. carinata

Binomial name
- Vriesea carinata Wawra

Synonyms
- Tillandsia carinata (Wawra) Baker; Vriesea psittacina var. carinata (Wawra) É.Morren; Vriesea brachystachys Regel; Vriesea carinata var. flavominiata Leme; Vriesea carinata f. intermedia Wawra; Vriesea carinata var. mangaratibensis Leme & And.Costa; Vriesea carinata var. wawra E.C.Bertram; Vriesea psittacina var. brachystachys (Regel) É.Morren

= Vriesea carinata =

Species of flowering plant

Vriesea carinata is a plant species in the genus Vriesea.

The bromeliad is endemic to the Atlantic Forest biome (Mata Atlantica Brasileira), located in southeastern Brazil.

== Cultivars ==
Garden cultivars include:

- Vriesea 'Brachystachys-Splendens'
- Vriesea 'Cardinalis'
- Vriesea 'Christiane'
- Vriesea 'Crimson Glow'
- Vriesea 'Karamea Tipsy'
- Vriesea 'Kienastii'
- Vriesea 'Lucille'
- Vriesea 'Main Roads'
- Vriesea 'Mariae'
- Vriesea 'Marjolein'
- Vriesea 'Medio-Rosea'
- Vriesea 'Morreniana'
- Vriesea 'Nitida'
- Vriesea 'Pendant'
- Vriesea 'Pulchella'
- Vriesea 'Rose Marie'
- Vriesea 'Saffron Flame'
- Vriesea 'Serene'
- Vriesea 'Sweet One'
- Vriesea 'Tenuis'
- Vriesea 'Versaillensis'
- Vriesea 'Witte Senior'
