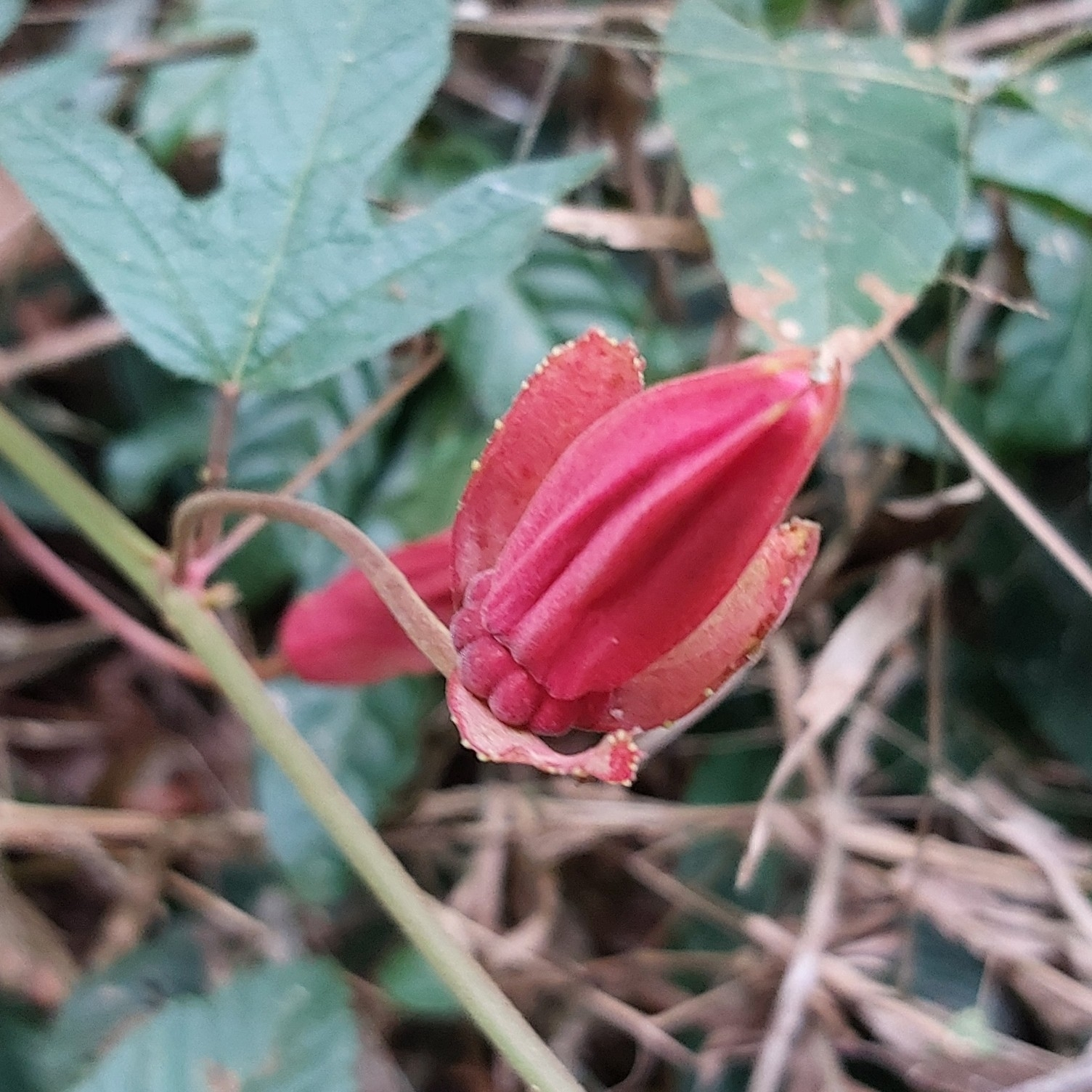

Scientific classification
- Kingdom: Plantae
- Clade: Tracheophytes
- Clade: Angiosperms
- Clade: Eudicots
- Clade: Rosids
- Order: Malpighiales
- Family: Passifloraceae
- Genus: Passiflora
- Species: P. speciosa

Binomial name
- Passiflora speciosa Gardner

= Passiflora speciosa =

Species of vine

Passiflora speciosa is a flowering vine of the family Passifloraceae. It is native to the neotropics. The flowers are pinkish-red, with long, slender petals up to 10 cm long.

The plant is native to south eastern parts of Brazil.
