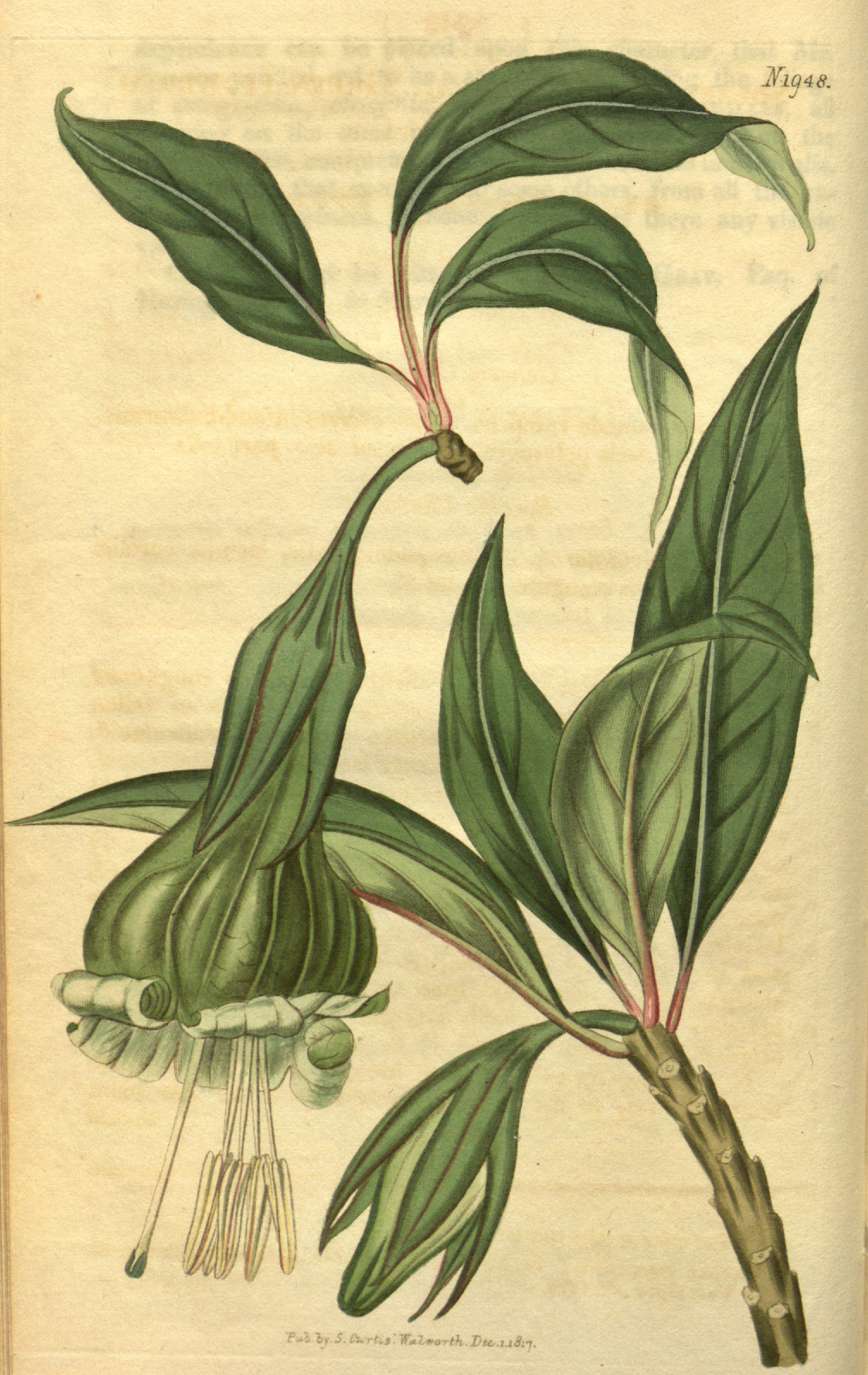
- Dyssochroma viridiflora (as Solandra viridiflora)

Scientific classification
- Kingdom: Plantae
- Clade: Tracheophytes
- Clade: Angiosperms
- Clade: Eudicots
- Clade: Asterids
- Order: Solanales
- Family: Solanaceae
- Genus: Dyssochroma; Miers

= Dyssochroma =

Genus of plants

Dyssochroma is a genus of flowering plants in the family Solanaceae. It is native to Northeast, South and Southeast Brazil.

== Species ==
Accepted species include:

- Dyssochroma atlantica (Stehmann & Giacomin) A.Orejuela & C.I.Orozco
- Dyssochroma caatingae G.B.Silva & T.R.S.Silva
- Dyssochroma jardimii G.B.Silva, Stehmann & Giacomin
- Dyssochroma longipes (Sendtn.) Miers
- Dyssochroma viridiflorum (Sims) Miers
