= Vriesea heterostachys =

Scientific classification
- Kingdom: Plantae
- Clade: Tracheophytes
- Clade: Angiosperms
- Clade: Monocots
- Clade: Commelinids
- Order: Poales
- Family: Bromeliaceae
- Genus: Vriesea
- Species: V. heterostachys

Binomial name
- Vriesea heterostachys (Baker) L.B.Sm.

Synonyms
- Tillandsia heterostachys Baker; Vriesea petropolitana L.B.Sm.

Species of plant

Vriesea heterostachys is a species of flowering plant in the Bromeliaceae family. The bromeliad is endemic to the Atlantic Forest biome (Mata Atlantica Brasileira), located in southeastern Brazil.

== Cultivars ==
Garden cultivars include:

- Vriesea 'Burgundy Bubbles'
- Vriesea 'Highlights'
- Vriesea 'Little Dumplin'
- Vriesea 'One Year'
- Vriesea 'Sweetheart'
