= Prance =

Prance is a surname. Notable people with the surname include:

- Bertram Prance (1889–1958), British artist and illustrator
- George Prance (1827–1885), sailor in the U.S. Navy during the American Civil War
- Ghillean Prance (born 1937), British botanist and ecologist
- Miles Prance (fl. 1678), English Roman Catholic craftsman
