= Vriesea inflata =

Scientific classification
- Kingdom: Plantae
- Clade: Tracheophytes
- Clade: Angiosperms
- Clade: Monocots
- Clade: Commelinids
- Order: Poales
- Family: Bromeliaceae
- Genus: Vriesea
- Species: V. inflata

Binomial name
- Vriesea inflata (Wawra) Wawra

Synonyms
- Tillandsia inflata (Wawra) Baker; Vriesea carinata var. inflata Wawra; Vriesea incurvata var. inflata (Wawra) Mez; Vriesea incurvata É.Morren

Species of flowering plant

Vriesea inflata is a plant species in the genus Vriesea.

The bromeliad is endemic to the Atlantic Forest biome (Mata Atlantica Brasileira), located in southeastern Brazil.

== Cultivars ==
Garden cultivars include:

- Vriesea 'Charm'
- Vriesea 'Charm Too'
- Vriesea 'Chubby'
- Vriesea 'Flirtation'
- Vriesea 'Golden Koi'
- Vriesea 'Infatuation'
- Vriesea 'Sacred Fire'
- Vriesea 'Sunrise'
- × Vrieslandsia 'Golden Touch'
- × Vrieslandsia 'Swamp Fire'
