= Ilex taubertiana =

Conservation status
- Least Concern (IUCN 3.1)

Scientific classification
- Kingdom: Plantae
- Clade: Tracheophytes
- Clade: Angiosperms
- Clade: Eudicots
- Clade: Asterids
- Order: Aquifoliales
- Family: Aquifoliaceae
- Genus: Ilex
- Species: I. taubertiana

Binomial name
- Ilex taubertiana Loes.

Synonyms
- Ilex kleinii Edwin

Species of holly

Ilex taubertiana is a species of flowering plant of the family Aquifoliaceae. It is native to Brazil, typically in Atlantic Forest, where it is found in montane rain forests and cloud forests.

It is occasionally used to adulterate maté.
