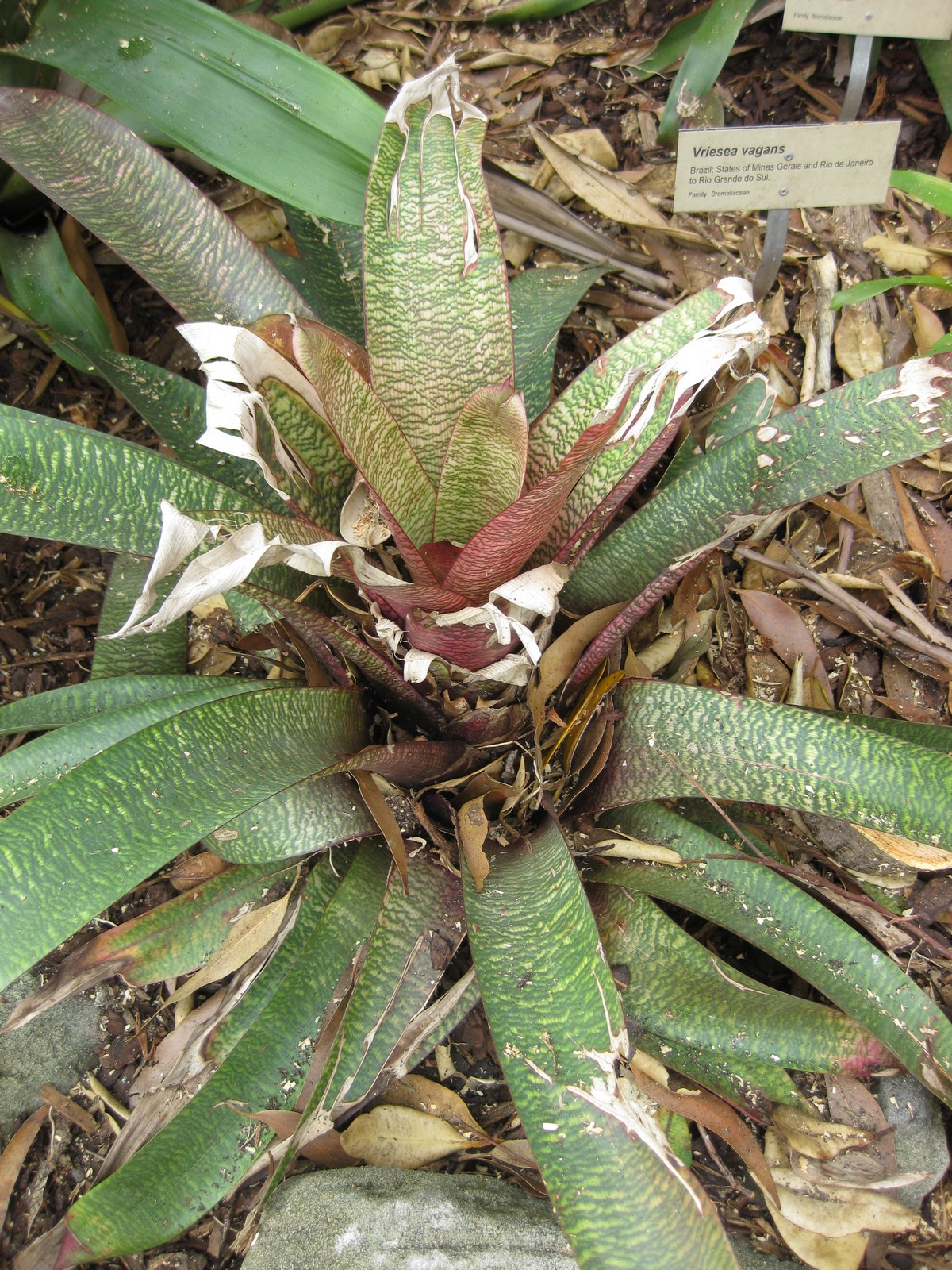

Scientific classification
- Kingdom: Plantae
- Clade: Tracheophytes
- Clade: Angiosperms
- Clade: Monocots
- Clade: Commelinids
- Order: Poales
- Family: Bromeliaceae
- Genus: Vriesea
- Species: V. vagans

Binomial name
- Vriesea vagans (L.B.Smith) L.B.Smith

= Vriesea vagans =

Species of flowering plant

Vriesea vagans is a plant species in the genus Vriesea. The bromeliad is endemic to the Atlantic Forest biome (Mata Atlantica Brasileira), located in southeastern Brazil.
