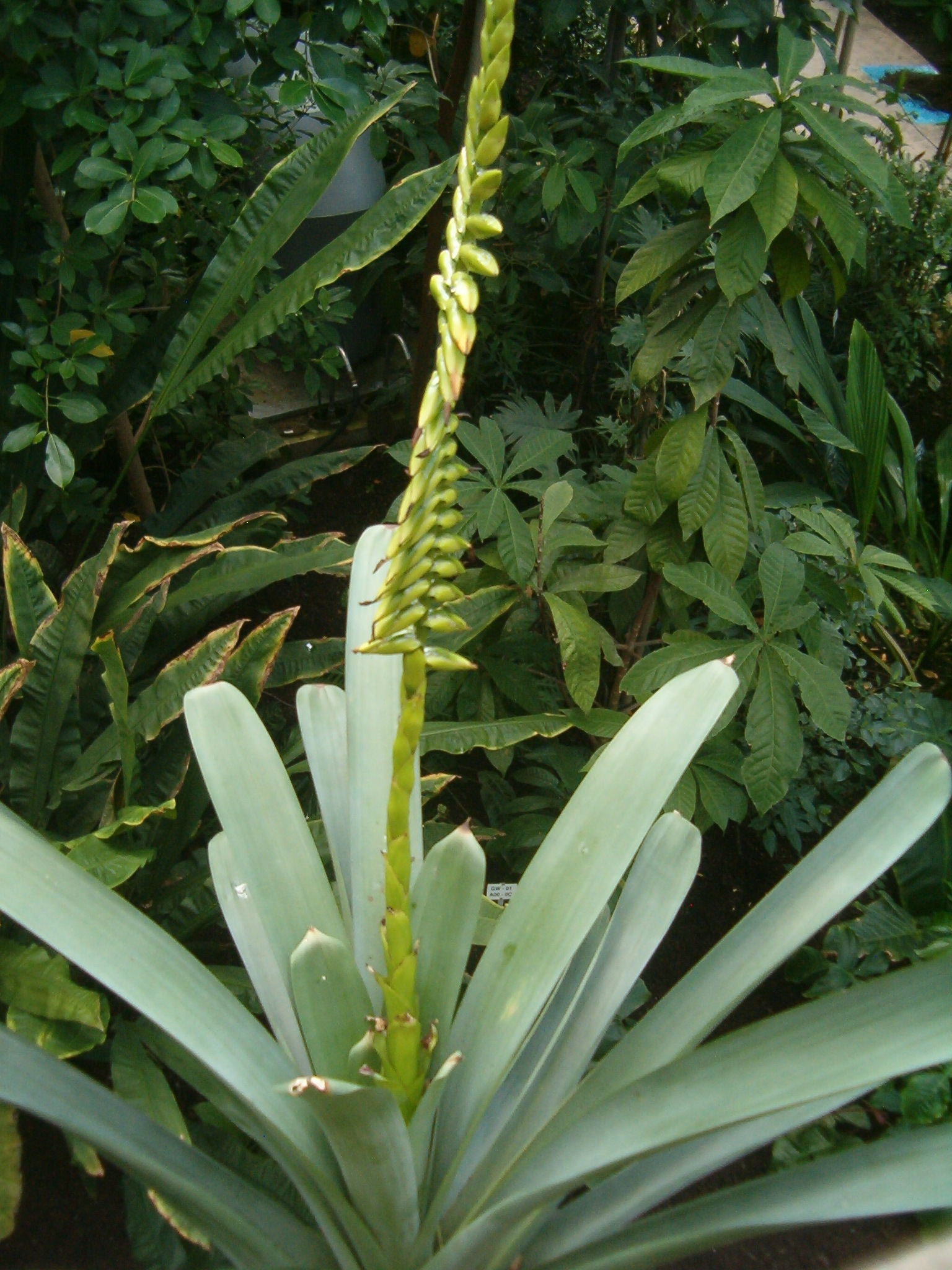

Conservation status
- Least Concern (IUCN 3.1)

Scientific classification
- Kingdom: Plantae
- Clade: Tracheophytes
- Clade: Angiosperms
- Clade: Monocots
- Clade: Commelinids
- Order: Poales
- Family: Bromeliaceae
- Genus: Vriesea
- Species: V. bituminosa

Binomial name
- Vriesea bituminosa Wawra

= Vriesea bituminosa =

Species of flowering plant

Vriesea bituminosa is a plant species in the genus Vriesea, endemic to Brazil and Venezuela.

== Distribution ==
The bromeliad is a native plant in Brazil and Venezuela.

Its range includes the Atlantic Forest biome (Mata Atlantica Brasileira), located in southeastern Brazil.

== Cultivars ==
Garden cultivars include:

- Vriesea 'Exotica Jungle Tips'
- Vriesea 'Highway Beauty'
