= Ilex microdonta =

Conservation status
- Least Concern (IUCN 3.1)

Scientific classification
- Kingdom: Plantae
- Clade: Tracheophytes
- Clade: Angiosperms
- Clade: Eudicots
- Clade: Asterids
- Order: Aquifoliales
- Family: Aquifoliaceae
- Genus: Ilex
- Species: I. microdonta

Binomial name
- Ilex microdonta Reissek

Species of holly

Ilex microdonta is a species of flowering plant. It is a tree native to southeastern Brazil, where it is found in high-elevation montane cloud forests of the Atlantic Forest region.
