= Vriesea hydrophora =

Scientific classification
- Kingdom: Plantae
- Clade: Tracheophytes
- Clade: Angiosperms
- Clade: Monocots
- Clade: Commelinids
- Order: Poales
- Family: Bromeliaceae
- Genus: Vriesea
- Species: V. hydrophora

Binomial name
- Vriesea hydrophora Ule

Species of flowering plant

Vriesea hydrophora is a plant species in the genus Vriesea.

The bromeliad is endemic to the Atlantic Forest biome (Mata Atlantica Brasileira), located in southeastern Brazil.
