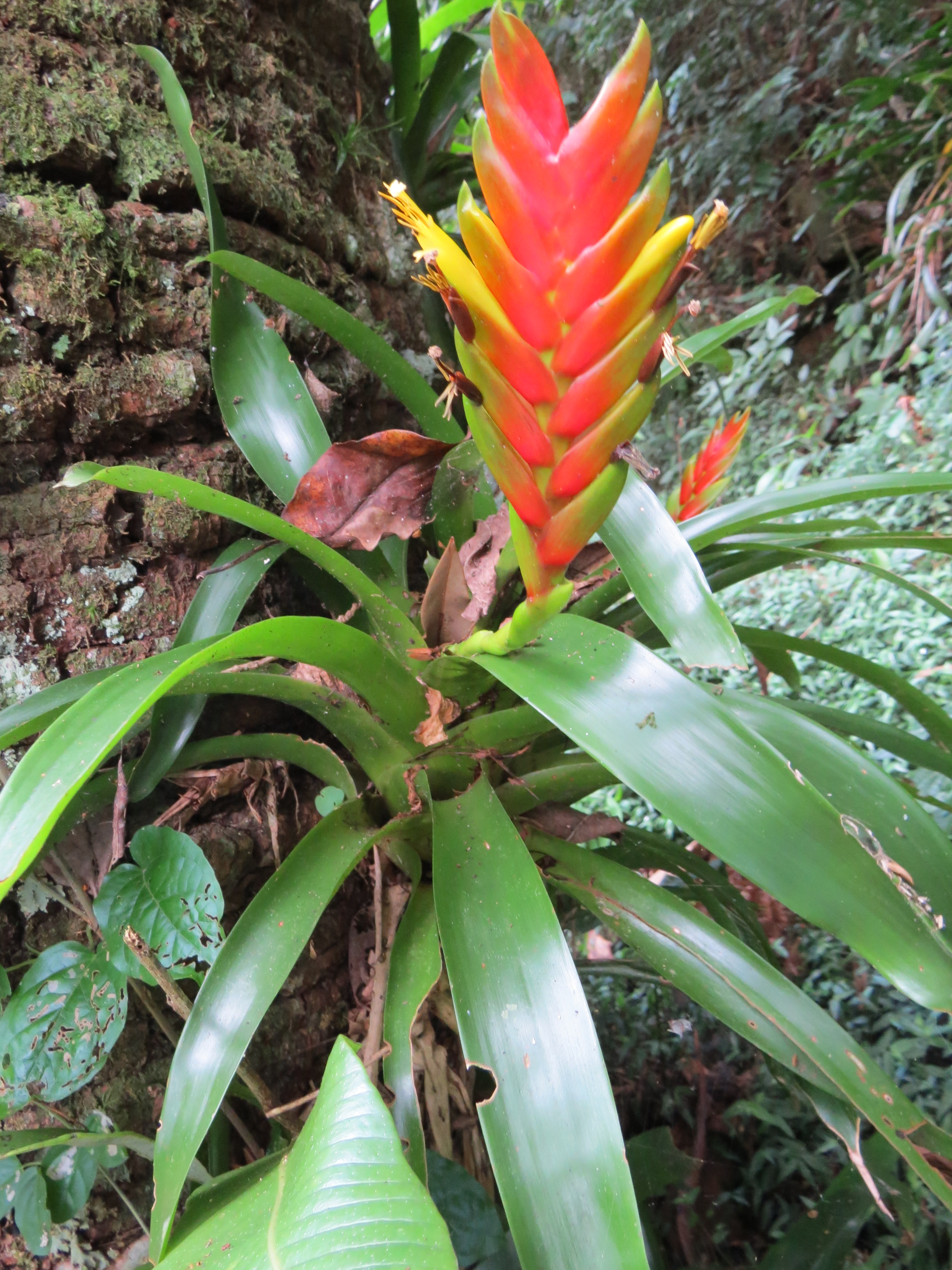

Scientific classification
- Kingdom: Plantae
- Clade: Tracheophytes
- Clade: Angiosperms
- Clade: Monocots
- Clade: Commelinids
- Order: Poales
- Family: Bromeliaceae
- Genus: Vriesea
- Species: V. paraibica

Binomial name
- Vriesea paraibica Wawra

Synonyms
- Tillandsia carinata var. constricta (Wawra) Baker; Tillandsia paraibica (Wawra) Baker; Vriesea carinata var. constricta Wawra; Vriesea pallidiflora E.Pereira; Vriesea squamosa É.Morren ex Baker

= Vriesea paraibica =

Species of flowering plant

Vriesea paraibica is a species of flowering plant in the genus Vriesea. This bromeliad is endemic to the Atlantic Forest biome (Mata Atlantica Brasileira), located in southeastern Brazil.
