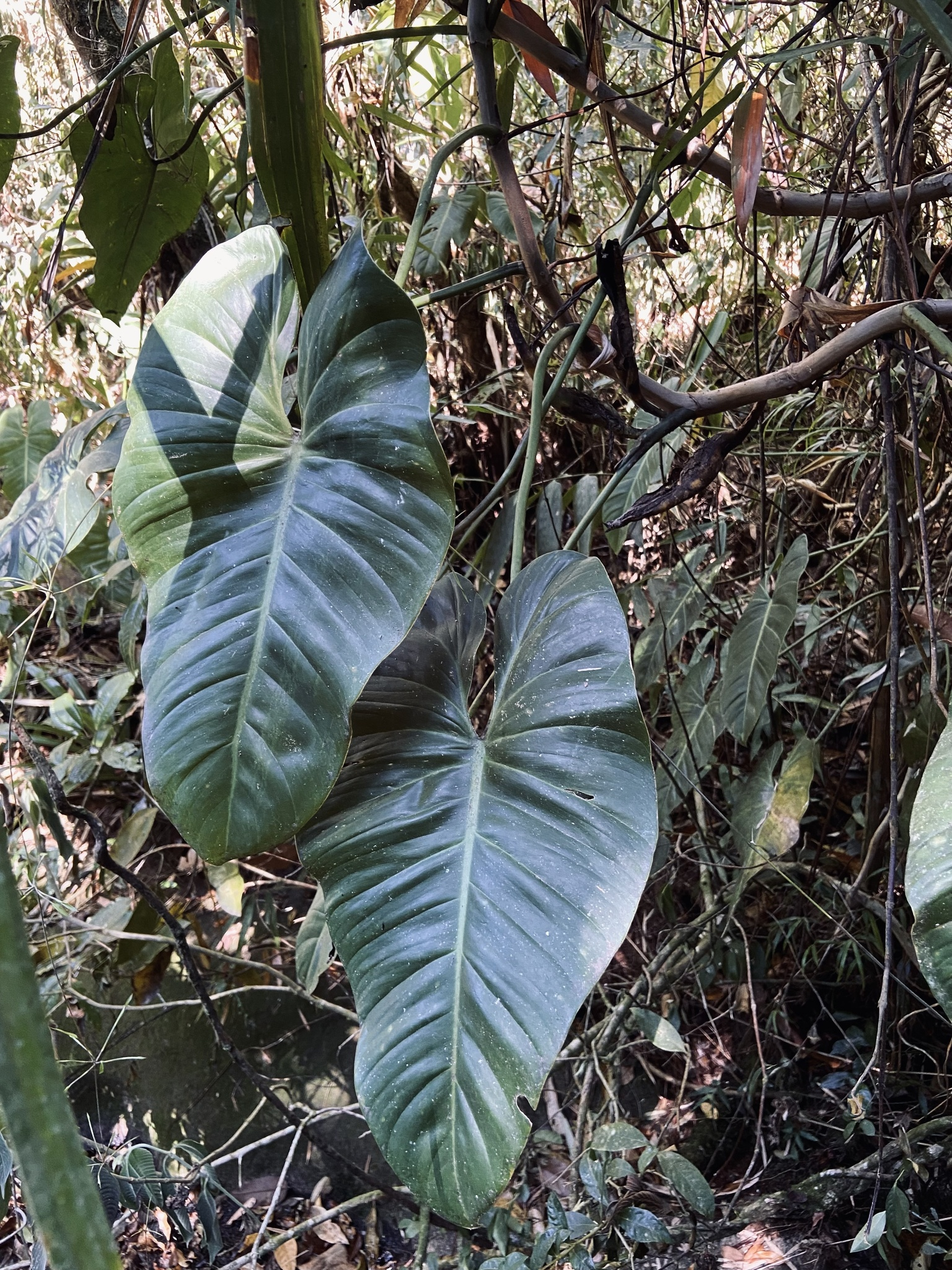
- In habitat in Brazil

Scientific classification
- Kingdom: Plantae
- Clade: Tracheophytes
- Clade: Angiosperms
- Clade: Monocots
- Order: Alismatales
- Family: Araceae
- Genus: Philodendron
- Species: P. appendiculatum

Binomial name
- Philodendron appendiculatum Nadruz & Mayo, 1998

= Philodendron appendiculatum =

Species of flowering plant

Philodendron appendiculatum, also known as güembé, is a perennial species in the genus Philodendron, belonging to the family Araceae. It lives in the jungles, wetlands, and moist forests of South America.

== Distribution and habitat ==
This species can be found in southeastern South America, in southeastern Brazil, in the states of Paraná and Santa Catarina. In Argentina it is found in the northwestern part of the country, e.g. in the province of Misiones.

== Description ==
This species features very large, petiolated leaves with long adventitious roots. Its flower is a monoecious spadix. Its fruit is a berry.

== Taxonomy ==
Philodendron appendiculatum was first described by Marcus A. Nadruz and Simon Joseph Mayo.

== Uses ==
It is used as an ornamental plant.
