= Fowlie =

Fowlie is a surname. Notable people with the surname include:

- Brenda Fowlie (born 1953), Canadian journalist and politician
- Jack Archie Fowlie (1929-1993), American botanist
- Wallace Fowlie (1908–1998), American writer and professor of literature
