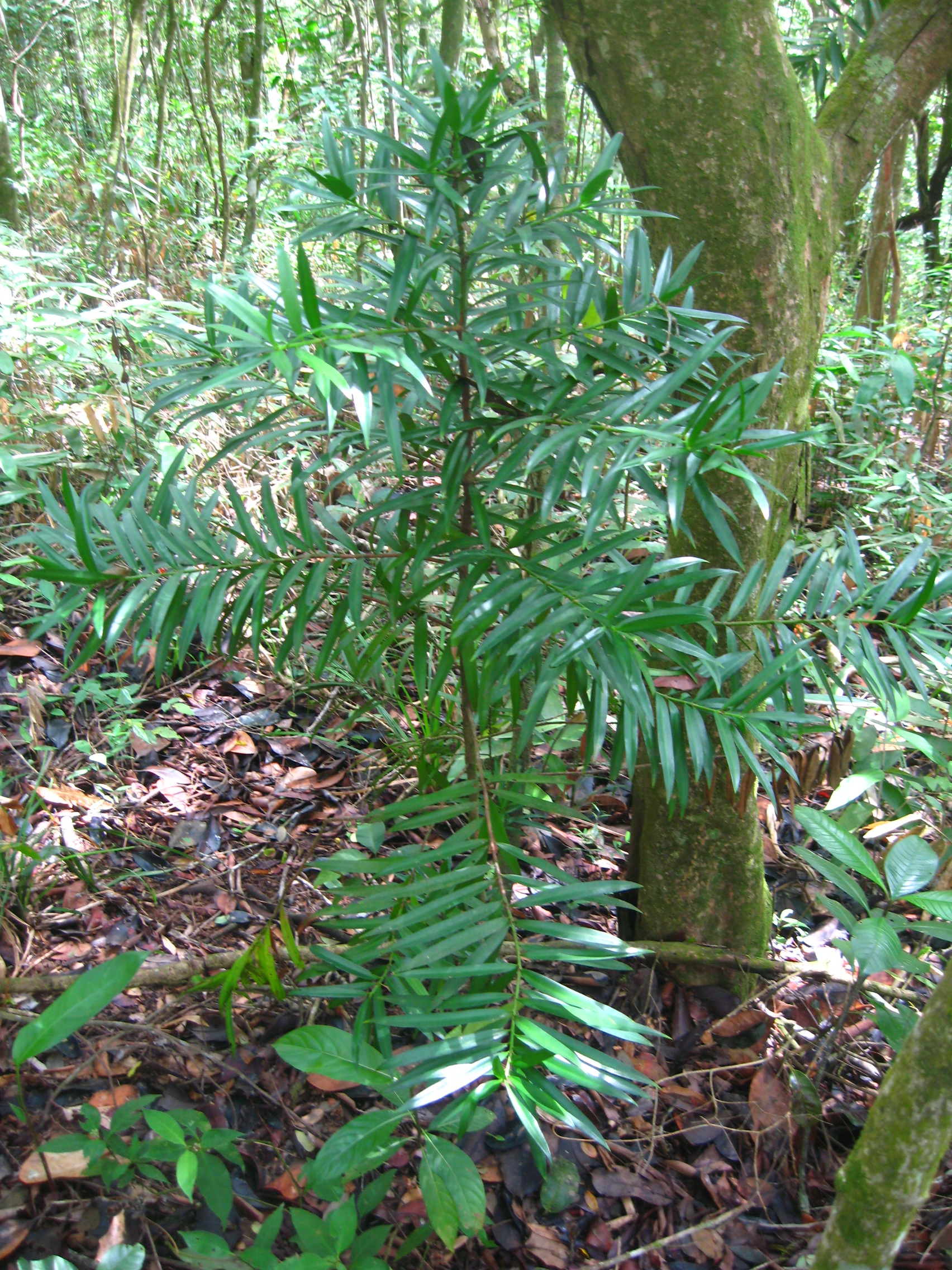
- Young specimen near Pacoti, Brazil

Conservation status
- Endangered (IUCN 3.1)

Scientific classification
- Kingdom: Plantae
- Clade: Tracheophytes
- Clade: Gymnosperms
- Division: Pinophyta
- Class: Pinopsida
- Order: Araucariales
- Family: Podocarpaceae
- Genus: Podocarpus
- Species: P. sellowii

Binomial name
- Podocarpus sellowii Klotzsch ex Endl.

Varieties
- Podocarpus sellowii var. angustifolius Pilg.; Podocarpus sellowii var. sellowii

Synonyms
- Nageia sellowii (Klotzsch ex Endl.) Kuntze

= Podocarpus sellowii =

Species of conifer

Podocarpus sellowii is a species of conifer in the family Podocarpaceae. It is a tree endemic to southern and southeastern Brazil.

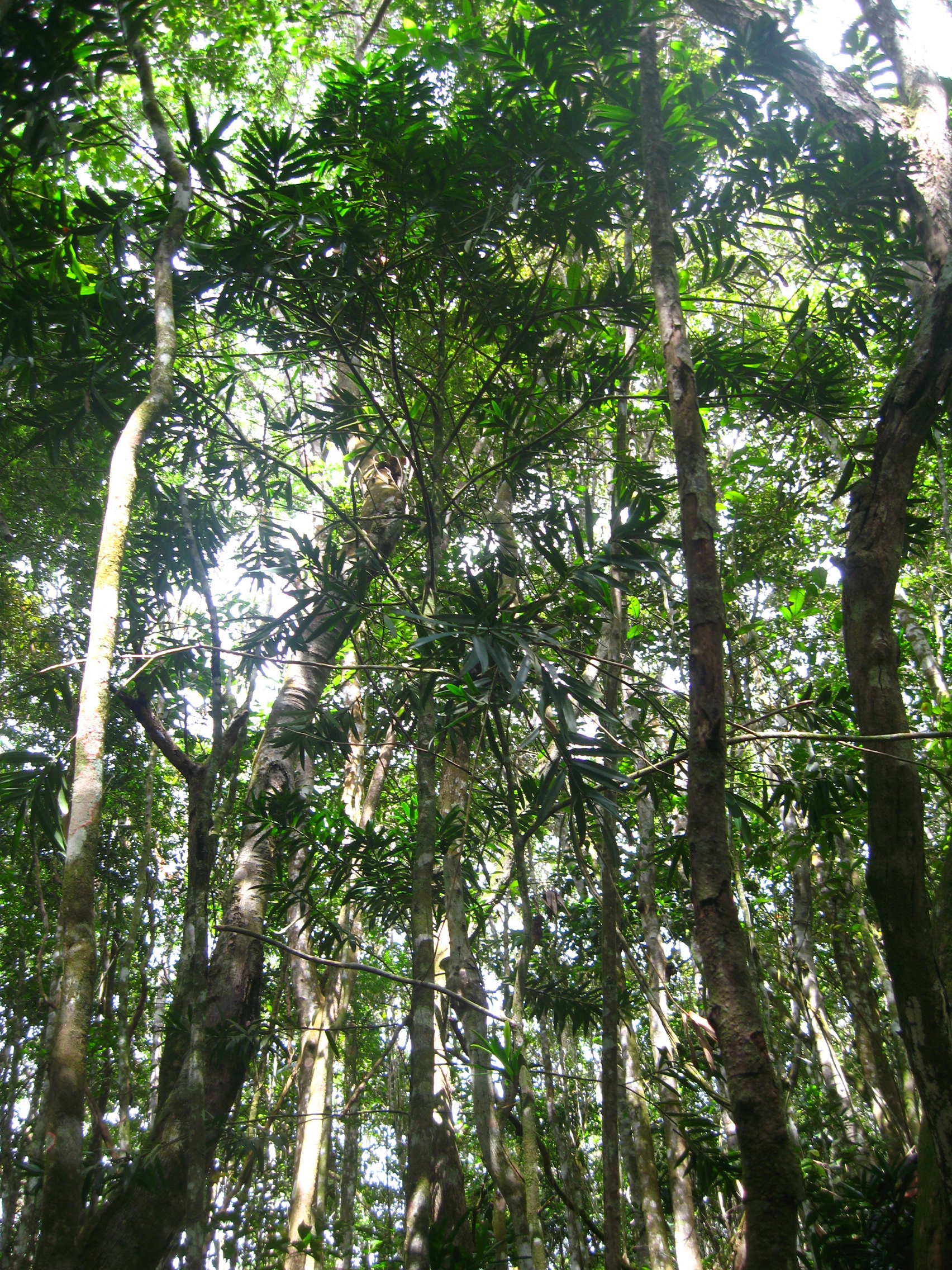
Adult tree (center)

== Description ==
Podocarpus sellowii grows as a small tree. Lichens and mosses grow epiphytically on the tree.

== Distribution and habitat ==
Podocarpus sellowii is endemic to Brazil, where it is confined to areas of the Atlantic Forest in the south of the country. It grows in evergreen subtropical moist montane forest at elevations of 800–1,800 m (3,000–6,000 ft).

== Varieties ==
Two varieties are accepted:

- Podocarpus sellowii var. angustifolius Pilg. – Rio de Janeiro
- Podocarpus sellowii var. sellowii – Rio de Janeiro to Rio Grande do Sul

== Conservation ==
Podocarpus sellowii has been assessed as Endangered on the IUCN Red List. It is threatened by conversion of land for agriculture. Only limited parts of the species' range are in protected areas. Variety sellowii is also assessed as Endangered, and variety angustifolius is assessed as Critically Endangered.
