= Ilex integerrima =

Scientific classification
- Kingdom: Plantae
- Clade: Tracheophytes
- Clade: Angiosperms
- Clade: Eudicots
- Clade: Asterids
- Order: Aquifoliales
- Family: Aquifoliaceae
- Genus: Ilex
- Species: I. integerrima

Binomial name
- Ilex integerrima Reissek

Species of holly

Ilex integerrima ("Soundest holly") is a species of holly in the family Aquifoliaceae, native from Brazil and typically found in its Atlantic Forest vegetation. It is sometimes used as an adulterant for maté.
