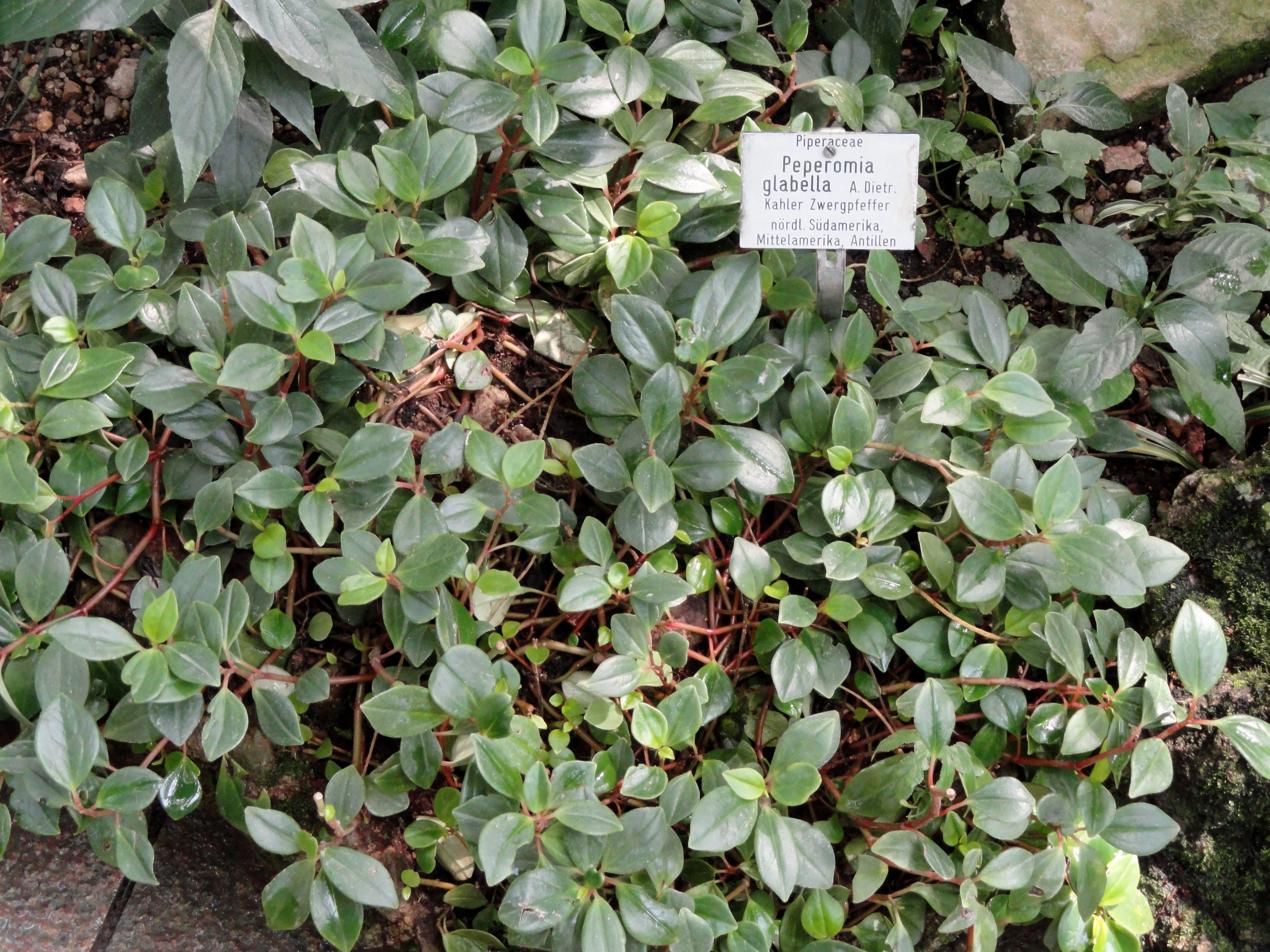

Scientific classification
- Kingdom: Plantae
- Clade: Tracheophytes
- Clade: Angiosperms
- Clade: Magnoliids
- Order: Piperales
- Family: Piperaceae
- Genus: Peperomia
- Species: P. glabella

Binomial name
- Peperomia glabella (Sw.) A.Dietr.

Synonyms
- List: Piper glabellum Sw.

= Peperomia glabella =

Species of plant

Peperomia glabella, commonly known as the cypress peperomia or wax privet, is a species of plant in the genus Peperomia of the family Piperaceae. Its native range is from southern North America to central South America. Three varieties are known. In addition to the basic one they are P. glabella var. nudipetiolata ( Trel. & Yunck.) and P. glabella var. obtusa (Steyerm.).
