= Rinaldo de Lamare =

Brazilian physician (1910–2002)

Rinaldo de Lamare (1910 in Santos, São Paulo – 2002 in Rio de Janeiro) was a Brazilian physician who specialized in pediatrics and a writer of books on child health and care for the general public. His family was of Danish and Norman origins. His father, Victor de Lamare, was an engineer. Aged 16 he moved to Rio de Janeiro, to prepare himself to study medicine at the medical school of the Federal University of Rio de Janeiro.

His best known book, "A Vida do Bebê" (The Baby's Life) has sold more than 6,5 million copies in 41 editions. He revised and updated the book a number of times, and it is considered the best reference for Brazilian parents.

He was a strong proponent of what he considered the three greatest breakthroughs in child health: antibiotics, vaccines and breast feeding. He was also the first to introduce the use of a simple recipe for a home care isotonic and nutritive solution for the treatment of infant diarrhea, a major cause of death in the first half of the 20th century in Brazil.

Dr. de Lamare was a member and president of the Brazilian National Academy of Medicine and member of the American Academy of Pediatrics, a member and president of the Sociedade Brasileira de Pediatria (1948–1949) and full professor at Pontifical Catholic University. From 1964 to 1965 he was also a director of the National Child Department of the Ministry of Health.

Dr de Lamare had a busy private practice in Rio, with more than 60,000 patients on record. He stopped practising after 1985, when he underwent a heart bypass operation.

== Books ==
- A Vida do Bebê
- Diario do Bebê Rosa
- Diário do Bebê: Eu e os Meus Primeiros Anos
- A Grávida e o Bebê: da Concepção ao Parto
- A Vida de Nossos Filhos (2 a 16 Anos)
