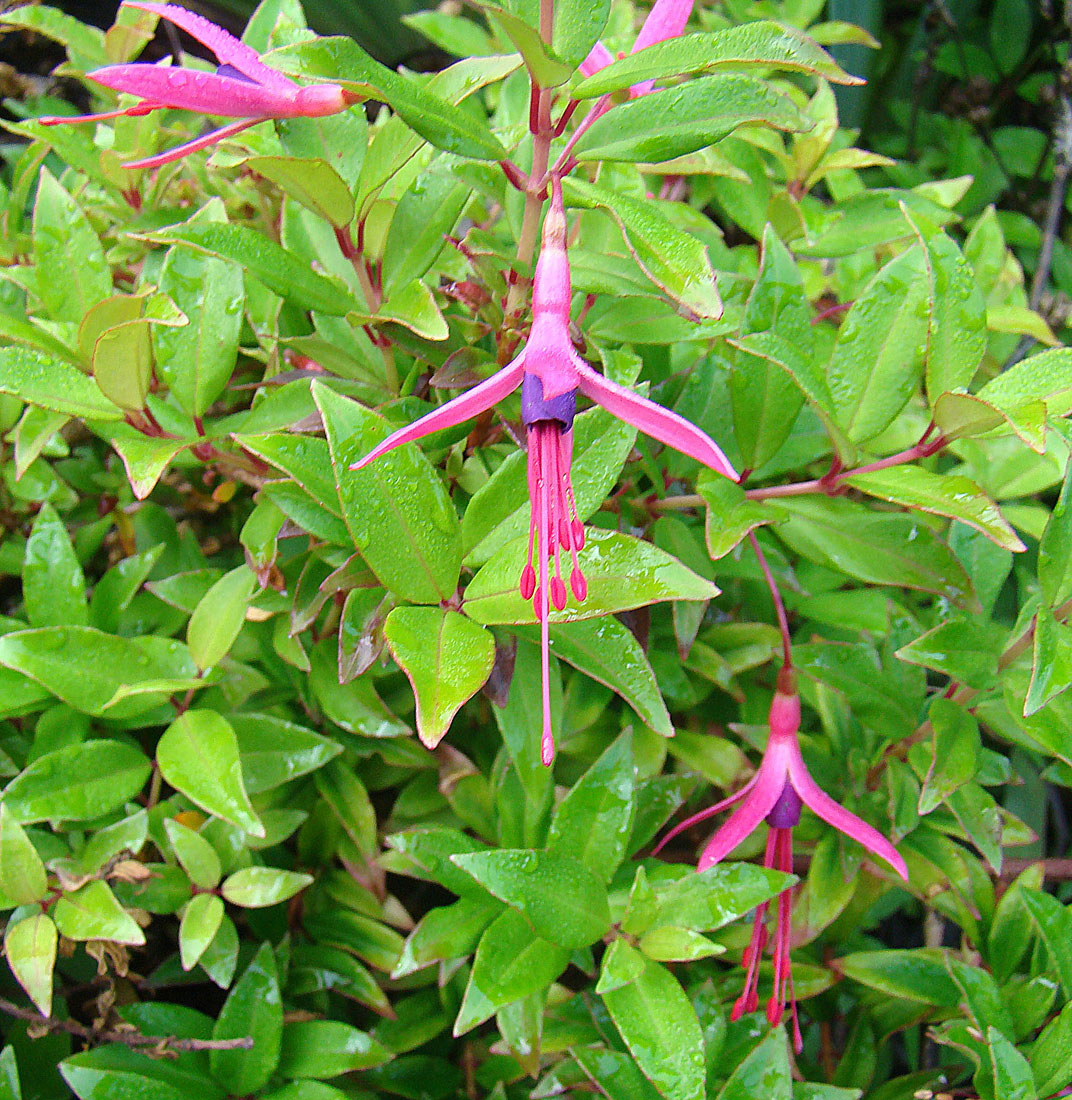
- In bloom at the University of California Botanical Garden

Scientific classification
- Kingdom: Plantae
- Clade: Embryophytes
- Clade: Tracheophytes
- Clade: Spermatophytes
- Clade: Angiosperms
- Clade: Eudicots
- Clade: Rosids
- Order: Myrtales
- Family: Onagraceae
- Genus: Fuchsia
- Species: F. glazioviana

Binomial name
- Fuchsia glazioviana Taub.

Synonyms
- Fuchsia santos-limae Brade, 1957

= Fuchsia glazioviana =

Species of flowering plant

Fuchsia glazioviana, called Glaziou's fuchsia, is a species of flowering plant in the genus Fuchsia, native to southeast Brazil. It has gained the Royal Horticultural Society's Award of Garden Merit.

== Description ==
Fuchsia glazioviana is a shrub that grows around 0.5–4 meters (1.6–13 ft) meters tall. Its branches grow up to 6 meters (20 ft) long and may have a purplish color with small detachable hairs. The dark green leaves are in groups of 2–3, oval in shape, 15–40 x 8–15 mm, smooth on top and paler below, with small glandular serrations on the edges. Stipules are broadly triangular, 0.6–1.2 x 0.6–1.2 mm, purplish, and deciduous. Flowers are usually solitary growing from the upper leaf axils, thin hairy peduncles 12–26 mm long. The ovary is oblong, 4–5 x 2.5 mm. The flower tube is cylindrical with few hairs outside, 5–7 x 2.5–4 mm. Sepals are red and 17–22 mm long. Petals are purple, oval, 9–12 x 6–9 mm. Filaments are red-purple and 16–28 mm long. The fruit is dark purple 10–16 mm x 8 mm. Seeds are oblong, 2–4 mm x 1–1.5 mm.

== Distribution ==
Fuchsia glazioviana is locally endemic to Rio de Janeiro, Brazil, specifically on mountains near Santa Maria Madalena and Nova Friburgo, at altitudes ranging from 1,500 to 2,100 meters (4,900 to 6,900 ft). It is known from only two mountains in the Serra do Mar of Rio de Janeiro, where it grows in open campo above the treeline, extending from upper cloud forest. It grows alongside Fuchsia regia subsp. regia on Morro da Nova Caledonia, with the two species hybridizing locally.

== Uses ==
The small, dark, oblong fruit is edible and has a mild, sweet flavor.
