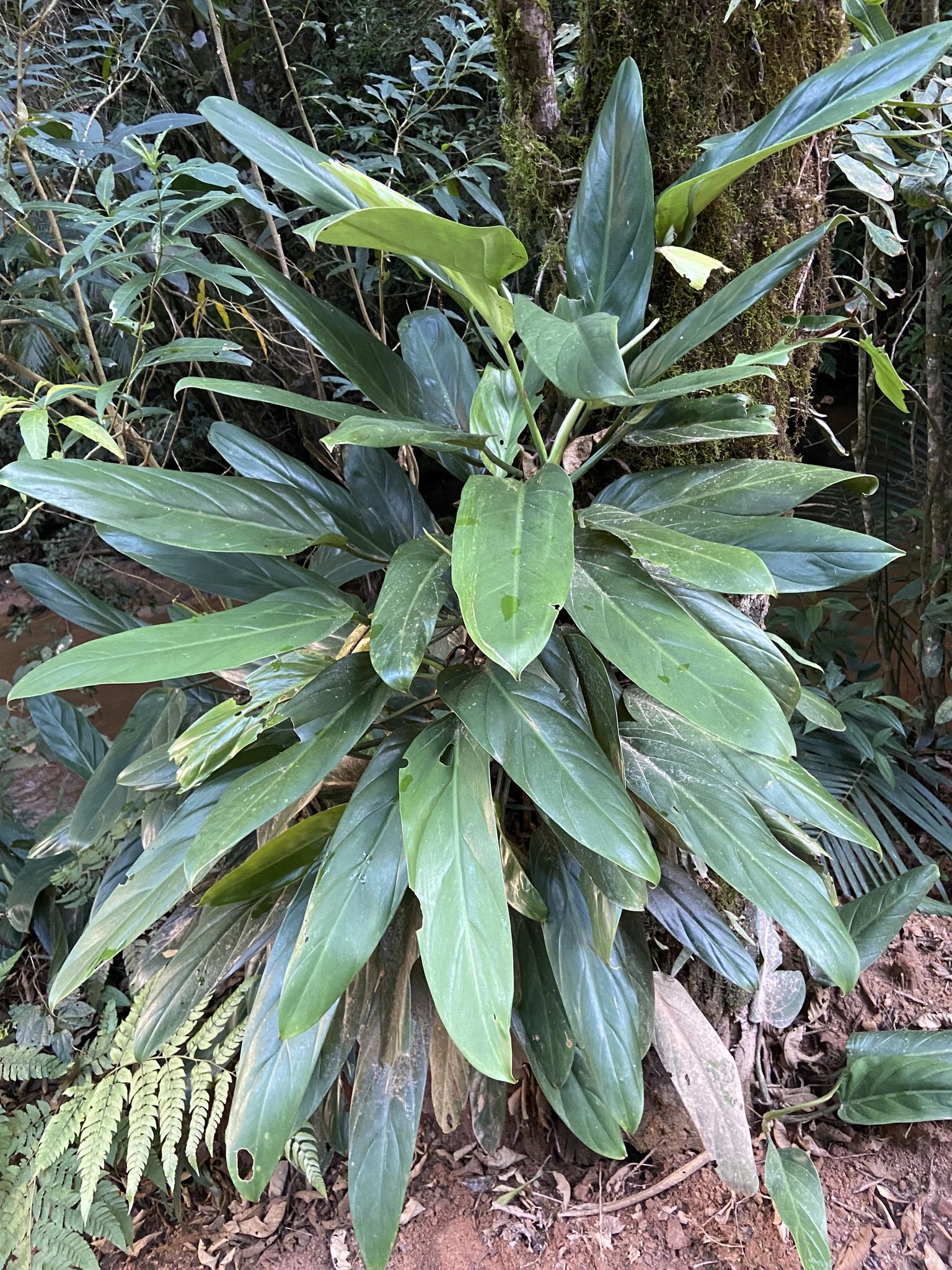

Scientific classification
- Kingdom: Plantae
- Clade: Tracheophytes
- Clade: Angiosperms
- Clade: Monocots
- Order: Alismatales
- Family: Araceae
- Genus: Philodendron
- Species: P. hatschbachii

Binomial name
- Philodendron hatschbachii Nadruz & Mayo

= Philodendron hatschbachii =

Species of plant

Philodendron hatschbachii is a species of plant in the genus Philodendron native to southeastern Brazil in the states of Espírito Santo and Rio de Janeiro. Critically endangered, it is a hemiepiphytic climber that grows in the tropical Atlantic forests of Brazil at 800–920 meters (2,620–3,020 ft). It named after Gerdt Guenther Hatschbach, a prolific Brazilian botanist who collected the first specimens.
