= Ambavia capuronii =

Conservation status
- Vulnerable (IUCN 3.1)

Scientific classification
- Kingdom: Plantae
- Clade: Embryophytes
- Clade: Tracheophytes
- Clade: Spermatophytes
- Clade: Angiosperms
- Clade: Magnoliids
- Order: Magnoliales
- Family: Annonaceae
- Genus: Ambavia
- Species: A. capuronii

Binomial name
- Ambavia capuronii (Cavaco & Keraudren) Le Thomas

Synonyms
- Popowia capuronii Cavaco & Keraudren

Species of flowering plant

Ambavia capuronii is a species of flowering plant in the family Annonaceae. It is a tree endemic to Madagascar. The IUCN Red List assesses the species as vulnerable.
