= Ambavia gerrardi =

Conservation status
- Least Concern (IUCN 3.1)

Scientific classification
- Kingdom: Plantae
- Clade: Tracheophytes
- Clade: Angiosperms
- Clade: Magnoliids
- Order: Magnoliales
- Family: Annonaceae
- Genus: Ambavia
- Species: A. gerrardi

Binomial name
- Ambavia gerrardi (Baill.) Le Thomas

Synonyms
- Homotypic: Polyalthia gerrardi (Baill.) T.Durand & Schinz; Popowia gerrardi (Baill.) Ghesq. ex Cavaco & Keraudren; Unona gerrardi Baill.; Heterotypic: Popowia gerrardi var. microsperma Ghesq. ex Cavaco & Keraudren; Popowia maritima Diels

Species of flowering plant

Ambavia gerrardi is a species of plants in the family Annonaceae. It is endemic to Madagascar.
