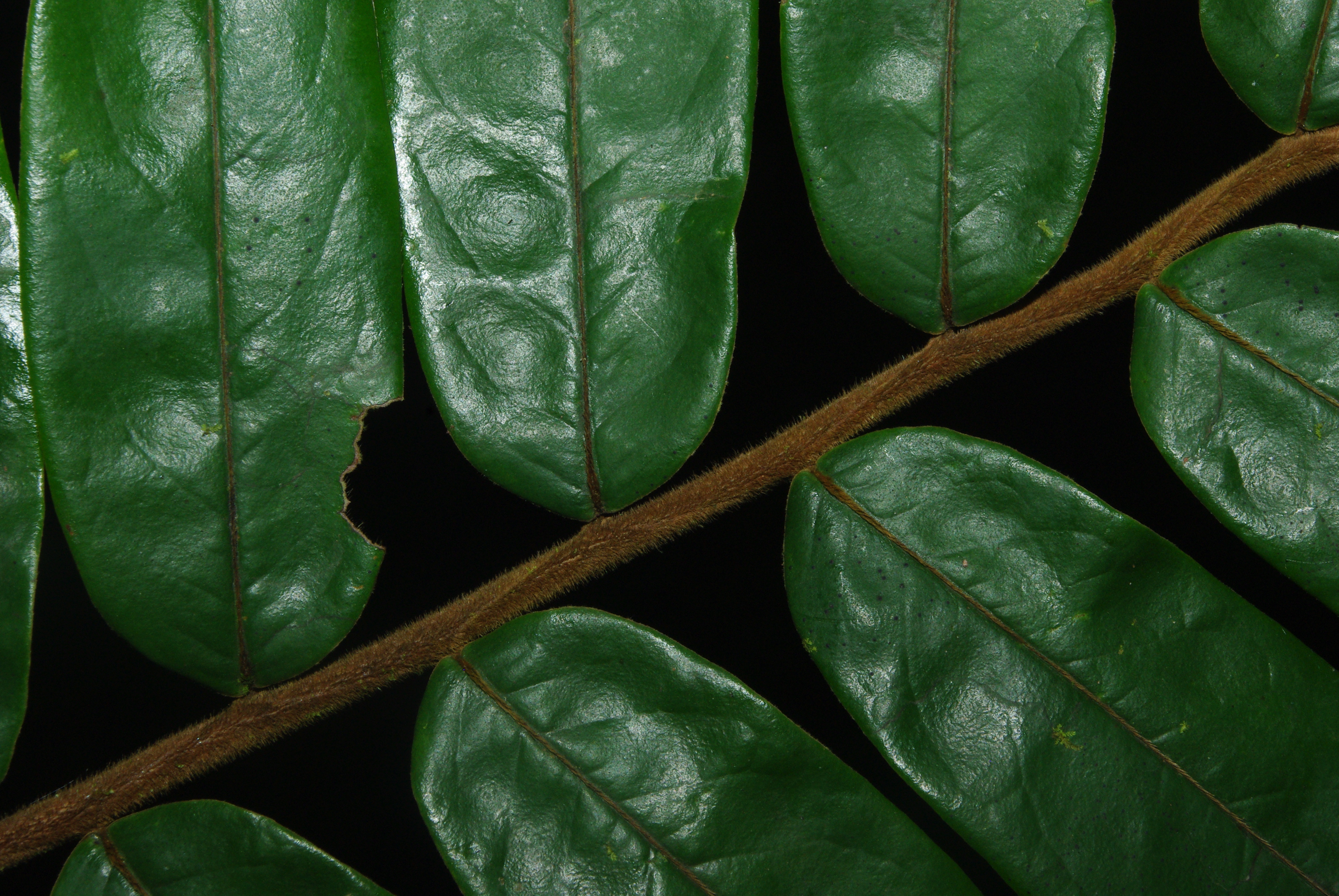
- The leaves of Xylopia le-testui

Conservation status
- Least Concern (IUCN 3.1)

Scientific classification
- Kingdom: Plantae
- Clade: Embryophytes
- Clade: Tracheophytes
- Clade: Spermatophytes
- Clade: Angiosperms
- Clade: Magnoliids
- Order: Magnoliales
- Family: Annonaceae
- Genus: Xylopia
- Species: X. le-testui

Binomial name
- Xylopia le-testui Pellegr., 1920

= Xylopia le-testui =

Species of plant

Xylopia le-testui, also known as canzi, is a plant in the custard apple family Annonaceae. It was first described in 1920 by François Pellegrin. A variety, X. l. var. longepilosa, known as endong, was described in 1969 by Annick Le Thomas.

== Description ==
It is an evergreen tree with brown bark growing up to 25 metres high.

== Distribution ==
The species is native to Central Africa.
