= Ambavia =

Scientific classification
- Kingdom: Plantae
- Clade: Tracheophytes
- Clade: Angiosperms
- Clade: Magnoliids
- Order: Magnoliales
- Family: Annonaceae
- Subfamily: Ambavioideae
- Genus: Ambavia; Le Thomas

Genus of flowering plants

Ambavia is a genus of flowering plants belonging to the family Annonaceae. Its native range is Madagascar.

== Species ==
As of January 2025, Plants of the World Online accepts the following 2 species:

- Ambavia capuronii (Cavaco & Keraudren) Le Thomas
- Ambavia gerrardi (Baill.) Le Thomas
