= Xylopia longifolia =

Conservation status
- Endangered (IUCN 2.3)

Scientific classification
- Kingdom: Plantae
- Clade: Tracheophytes
- Clade: Angiosperms
- Clade: Magnoliids
- Order: Magnoliales
- Family: Annonaceae
- Genus: Xylopia
- Species: X. longifolia

Binomial name
- Xylopia longifolia DC.

Species of flowering plant

Xylopia longifolia is a species of plant in the Annonaceae family. It is endemic to Panama. It is threatened by habitat loss.
