= Xylopia latipetala =

Conservation status
- Endangered (IUCN 2.3)

Scientific classification
- Kingdom: Plantae
- Clade: Tracheophytes
- Clade: Angiosperms
- Clade: Magnoliids
- Order: Magnoliales
- Family: Annonaceae
- Genus: Xylopia
- Species: X. latipetala

Binomial name
- Xylopia latipetala Verdc.

Species of flowering plant

Xylopia latipetala is a species of plant in the Annonaceae family. It is endemic to Tanzania. It is threatened by habitat loss.
