= Xylopia elliptica =

Conservation status
- Vulnerable (IUCN 3.1)

Scientific classification
- Kingdom: Plantae
- Clade: Tracheophytes
- Clade: Angiosperms
- Clade: Magnoliids
- Order: Magnoliales
- Family: Annonaceae
- Genus: Xylopia
- Species: X. elliptica

Binomial name
- Xylopia elliptica Maingay ex Hook.f. & Thomson

Species of tree

Xylopia elliptica is a species of flowering plant in the Annonaceae family.

== Distribution ==
It is grows naturally as a tree in Peninsular Malaysia.
