= Xylopia staudtii =

Conservation status
- Least Concern (IUCN 3.1)

Scientific classification
- Kingdom: Plantae
- Clade: Embryophytes
- Clade: Tracheophytes
- Clade: Spermatophytes
- Clade: Angiosperms
- Clade: Magnoliids
- Order: Magnoliales
- Family: Annonaceae
- Genus: Xylopia
- Species: X. staudtii

Binomial name
- Xylopia staudtii Engl. & Diels

Synonyms
- Xylopicrum staudtii (Engl. & Diels) Kuntze; Xylopia mayombensis De Wild.

Species of plant

Xylopia staudtii Engl & Diels is a tall tree within the Annonaceae family, it can grow up to 50 metres (160 ft) tall, the tallest height of the African Xylopia trees. It occurs in forest and freshwater swamps in West Africa.

== Description ==
The species has a straight and slender trunk with branching stilts roots and sometimes stilted peg-roots or pneumatophores, These pneumatophores can be up to 2 m (6 ft 7 in) in height, but much thinner than cypress knees, so that they need prop roots to hold them upright. Its diameter as measured by the d.b.h. can be up to 80 cm. The leaves are somewhat leathery and discolourous, paler abaxially, measures between 5.1-11.8 cm long and 2.0-5.6 cm wide. The leaf-blades are oblanceolate to obovate and sometimes elliptical outlined, blunt to acuminate apex, cuneate at the base, and decurrent on petiole. The fruit, up to 5 borne on a pedicel, have a green exterior and scarlet interior, are oblong shaped, thick walled and sparsely pubescent to glabrate.

== Distribution ==
It grows in West and Central Africa, from Guinea to Uganda, in high forest or swampy forest zones. It is widely spread in the Takamanda Reserve in Cameroon.

== Uses ==
Locals use stem bark extracts to treat dysentery in Cameroon and cold in Côte d'Ivoire.
