= Keraymonia =

Scientific classification
- Kingdom: Plantae
- Clade: Tracheophytes
- Clade: Angiosperms
- Clade: Eudicots
- Clade: Asterids
- Order: Apiales
- Family: Apiaceae
- Subfamily: Apioideae
- Genus: Keraymonia; Farille

Genus of plants

Keraymonia is a genus of flowering plants belonging to the family Apiaceae.

Its native range is East Himalayas, Nepal, and Tibet.

The genus name of Keraymonia is in honour of Monique Keraudren (1928–1981), an English painter and illustrator. It was first described and published in Candollea Vol.40 on page 528 in 1985.

Species, according to Kew:

- Keraymonia cortiformis Cauwet & S.B.Malla
- Keraymonia nipaulensis Cauwet & Farille
- Keraymonia pinnatifolia M.F.Watson
- Keraymonia triradiata Cauwet & Farille
