= Xylopia elliotii =

Conservation status
- Least Concern (IUCN 3.1)

Scientific classification
- Kingdom: Plantae
- Clade: Embryophytes
- Clade: Tracheophytes
- Clade: Spermatophytes
- Clade: Angiosperms
- Clade: Magnoliids
- Order: Magnoliales
- Family: Annonaceae
- Genus: Xylopia
- Species: X. elliotii

Binomial name
- Xylopia elliotii Pierre ex Engl. & Diels

Species of flowering plant

Xylopia elliotii is a species of plant in the Annonaceae family. It is found in Ghana and possibly Ivory Coast.
