= Xylopia amplexicaulis =

Conservation status
- Critically Endangered (IUCN 2.3)

Scientific classification
- Kingdom: Plantae
- Clade: Tracheophytes
- Clade: Angiosperms
- Clade: Magnoliids
- Order: Magnoliales
- Family: Annonaceae
- Genus: Xylopia
- Species: X. amplexicaulis

Binomial name
- Xylopia amplexicaulis (Lam.) Baill.

Species of flowering plant

Xylopia amplexicaulis is a species of plant in the Annonaceae family. It is endemic to Mauritius. It is threatened by habitat loss.
