= Xylopia hastarum =

Conservation status
- Near Threatened (IUCN 2.3)

Scientific classification
- Kingdom: Plantae
- Clade: Embryophytes
- Clade: Tracheophytes
- Clade: Spermatophytes
- Clade: Angiosperms
- Clade: Magnoliids
- Order: Magnoliales
- Family: Annonaceae
- Genus: Xylopia
- Species: X. hastarum

Binomial name
- Xylopia hastarum M.L.Green

Species of flowering plant

Xylopia hastarum is a species of flowering plant in the Annonaceae family. It is a tree endemic to Jamaica. It is threatened by habitat loss.
