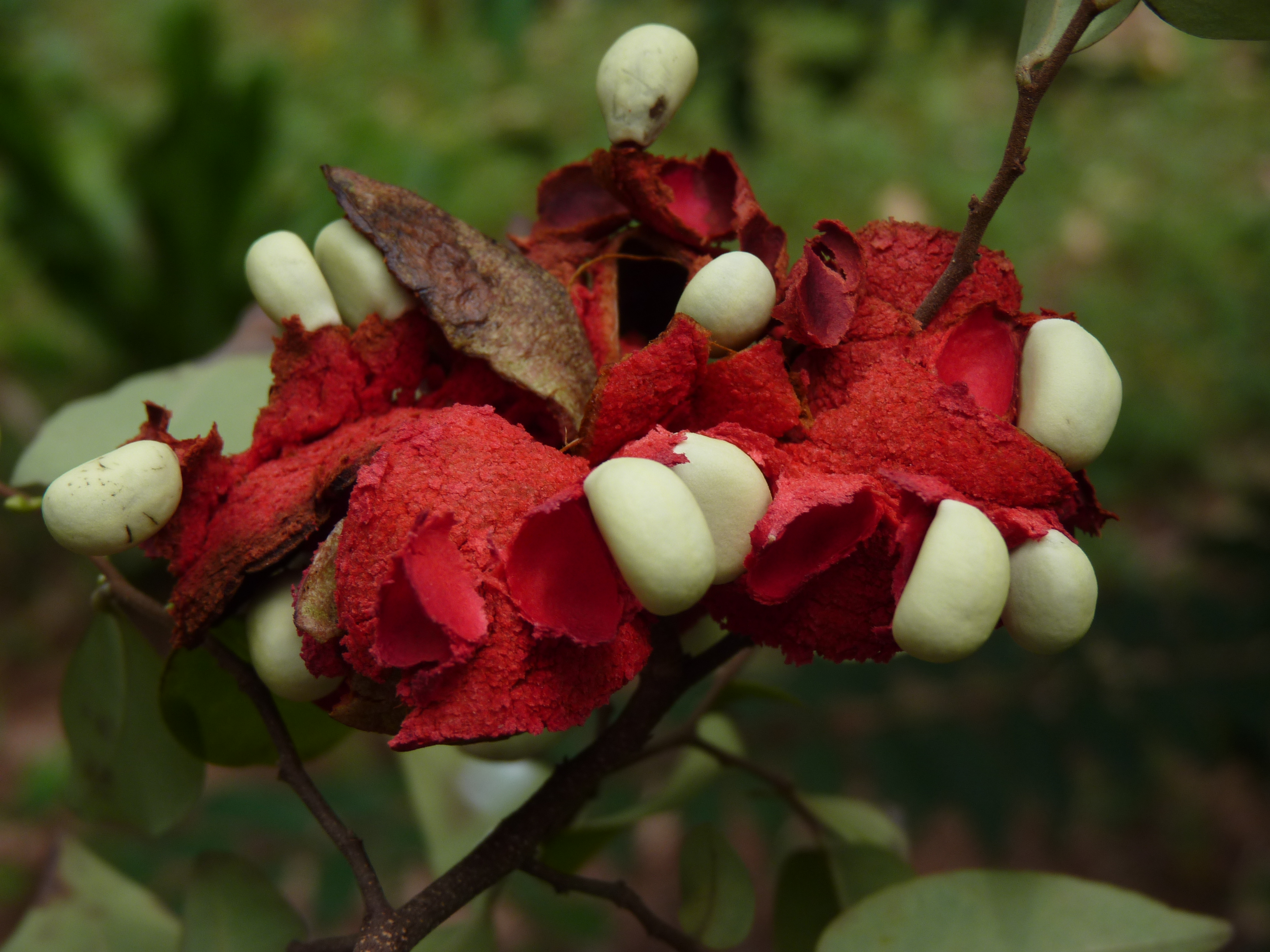

Conservation status
- Least Concern (IUCN 3.1)

Scientific classification
- Kingdom: Plantae
- Clade: Embryophytes
- Clade: Tracheophytes
- Clade: Spermatophytes
- Clade: Angiosperms
- Clade: Magnoliids
- Order: Magnoliales
- Family: Annonaceae
- Genus: Xylopia
- Species: X. parviflora

Binomial name
- Xylopia parviflora Spruce

= Xylopia parviflora =

Species of flowering plant

Xylopia parviflora is a species of plant in the Annonaceae family. It is native to Bolivia, Brazil, Colombia, Ecuador, French Guiana, Peru and Venezuela. Richard Spruce, the botanist who first formally described the species, named it after its small flowers (parviflora in Latin), though he did not specifically state their size.

== Description ==
It is a tree reaching 18.3 meters in height. Its branches form a dense pyramid-shaped profile. Its branches are tetrapinnate - they have branchlets that are themselves triply branched. The branches are covered in reddish-brown hairs. Its lance-shaped, rigidly membranous leaves are 2.5-3 by 0.7-0.8 centimeters. The upper surfaces of the leaves are dark green and hairless; the lower surfaces are covered in white, silky hairs that lay flat against surface. The bases of the leaves are pointed. The tips of the leaves are shallowly pointed. Its hairy petioles are 1 millimeter long, with a groove on their upper side. Its flowers occur on solitary peduncles that are 1-2 millimeters long and have a pair of bracts. Its flowers have 3 triangular sepals that are 1.5 by 2 millimeters. The sepals have pointed tips. The sepals have reddish-brown hairs on their outer surfaces and are hairless on the inside. Its 6 petals are arranged in two rows of 3. The outer petals are 5 millimeters long, pale on their outer surfaces, and covered in reddish, silky hairs. The flowers have ovaries with yellow-brown hairs.

=== Reproductive biology ===
The pollen of Xylopia parviflora is shed as permanent tetrads.

=== Distribution and habitat ===
It has been observed growing at elevations of 200-650 meters.
