= Xylopia ferruginea =

Conservation status
- Least Concern (IUCN 3.1)

Scientific classification
- Kingdom: Plantae
- Clade: Embryophytes
- Clade: Tracheophytes
- Clade: Spermatophytes
- Clade: Angiosperms
- Clade: Magnoliids
- Order: Magnoliales
- Family: Annonaceae
- Genus: Xylopia
- Species: X. ferruginea

Binomial name
- Xylopia ferruginea (Hook.f. & Thomson) Baill.

Synonyms
- Artabotrys malayanus Griff.; Habzelia ferruginea Hook.f. & Thomson; Melodorum ferrugineum (Hook.f. & Thomson) Finet & Gagnep.; Xylopia altissima Boerl.; Xylopicrum malayanum (Griff.) Kuntze

Species of tree

Xylopia ferruginea is a species of flowering plant in the family Annonaceae. It is a tree native to Peninsular Thailand, Peninsular Malaysia, Sumatra, and Borneo. It is a medium-sized forest tree which can reach 80 feet (24 meters) in height.

The word ferruginea is derived from the Latin word "ferrugo" ("rust"), and refers to the rusty colored hairs on the underside of the leaves.

In the Malay language, the common name is "Jangkang", which literally means "stilt roots".
