= Xylopia magna =

Conservation status
- Least Concern (IUCN 2.3)

Scientific classification
- Kingdom: Plantae
- Clade: Embryophytes
- Clade: Tracheophytes
- Clade: Spermatophytes
- Clade: Angiosperms
- Clade: Magnoliids
- Order: Magnoliales
- Family: Annonaceae
- Genus: Xylopia
- Species: X. magna

Binomial name
- Xylopia magna Maingay ex Hook.f.

Synonyms
- Xylopicrum magnum (Maingay ex Hook.f.) Kuntze

Species of tree

Xylopia magna is a species of flowering plant in the Annonaceae family. It is a tree found in Malaysia and Singapore.
