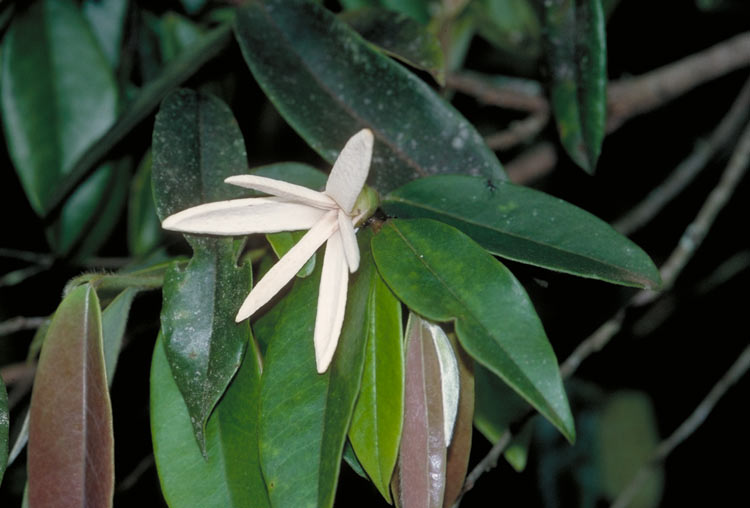
- Flower

Conservation status
- Least Concern (IUCN 3.1)

Scientific classification
- Kingdom: Plantae
- Clade: Embryophytes
- Clade: Tracheophytes
- Clade: Spermatophytes
- Clade: Angiosperms
- Clade: Magnoliids
- Order: Magnoliales
- Family: Annonaceae
- Genus: Xylopia
- Species: X. maccreae

Binomial name
- Xylopia maccreae (F.Muell.) L.S.Sm.

Synonyms
- Melodorum maccreae F.Muell.; Fissistigma maccreae (F.Muell.) Merr.

= Xylopia maccreae =

Orange jacket

Species of flowering plant

Xylopia maccreae, commonly known as orange jacket or MacCrea's xylopia, is a plant in the custard apple family Annonaceae found only in coastal areas of north and central Queensland, Australia. It is an evergreen tree up to 10 m (33 ft) tall with small buttresses, and young shoots covered in silky hairs. It was first described in 1868 as Melodorum maccreae by the botanist Ferdinand von Mueller, and transferred to the genus Xylopia in 1956 by Lindsay Stuart Smith. It is one of the food plants for the green-spotted triangle (Graphium agamemnon).

== Conservation ==
As of November 2024, this species has been assessed to be of least concern by the International Union for Conservation of Nature (IUCN) and by the Queensland Government under its Nature Conservation Act.

== Gallery ==
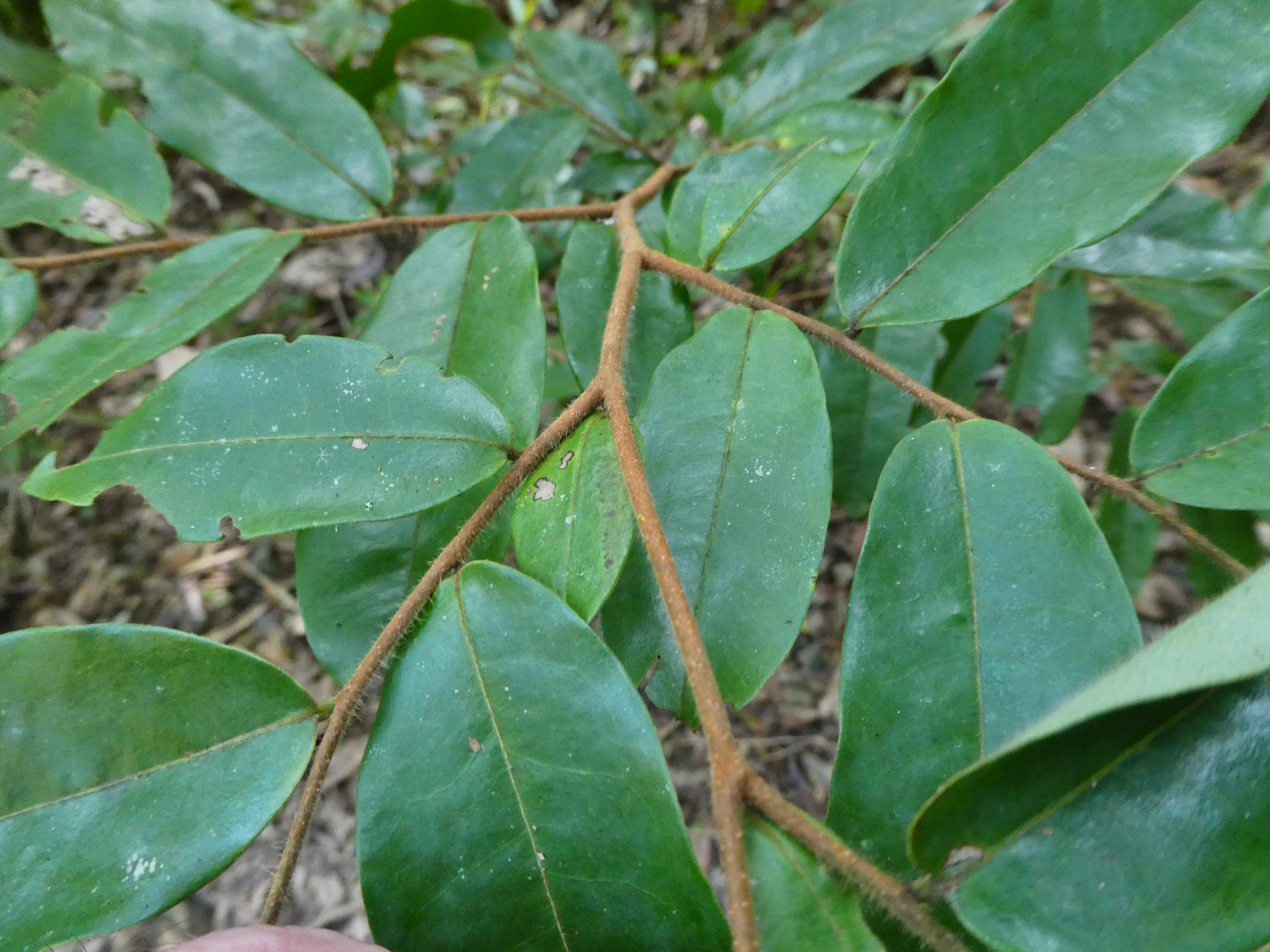
Foliage

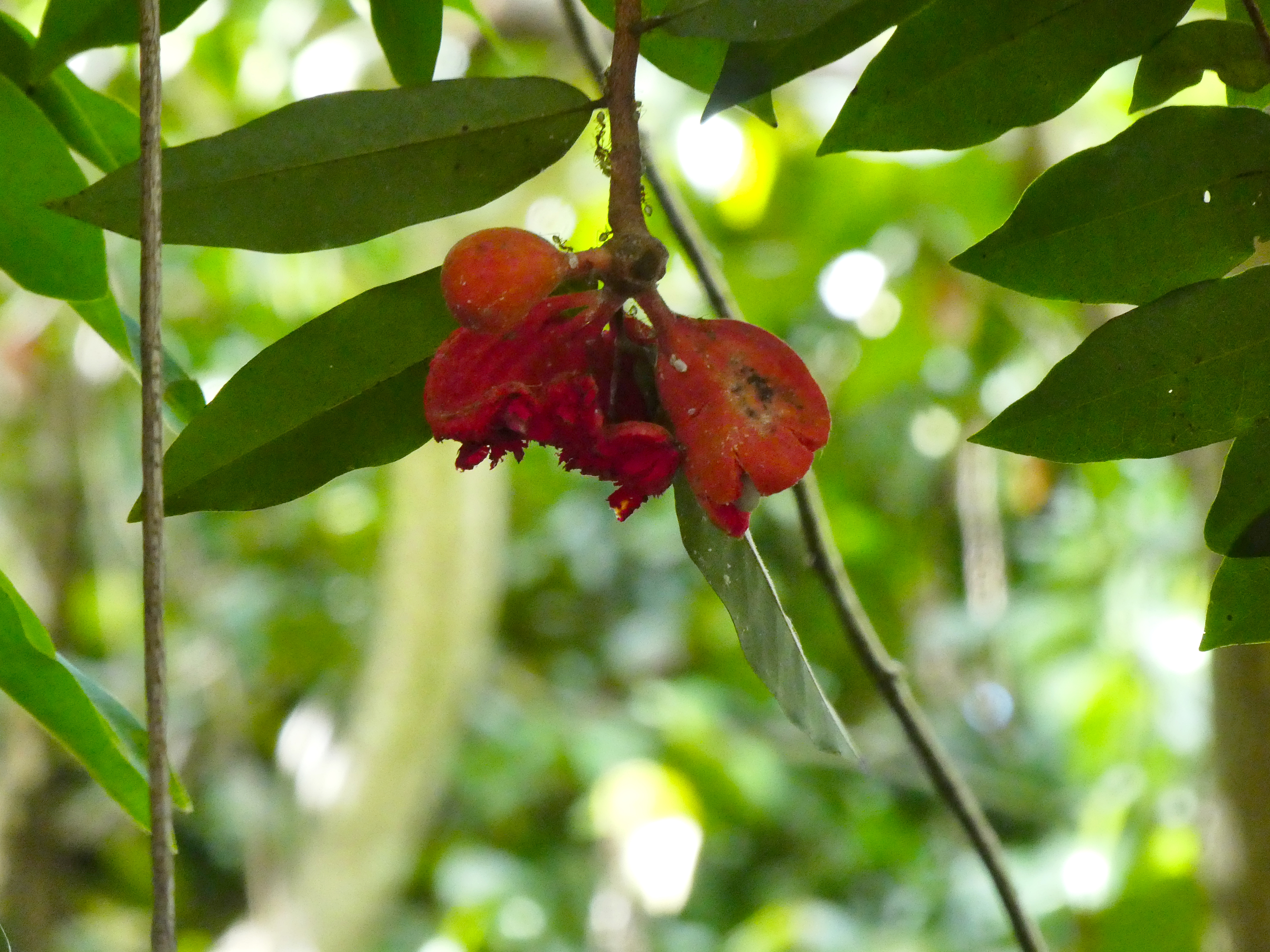
Fruit

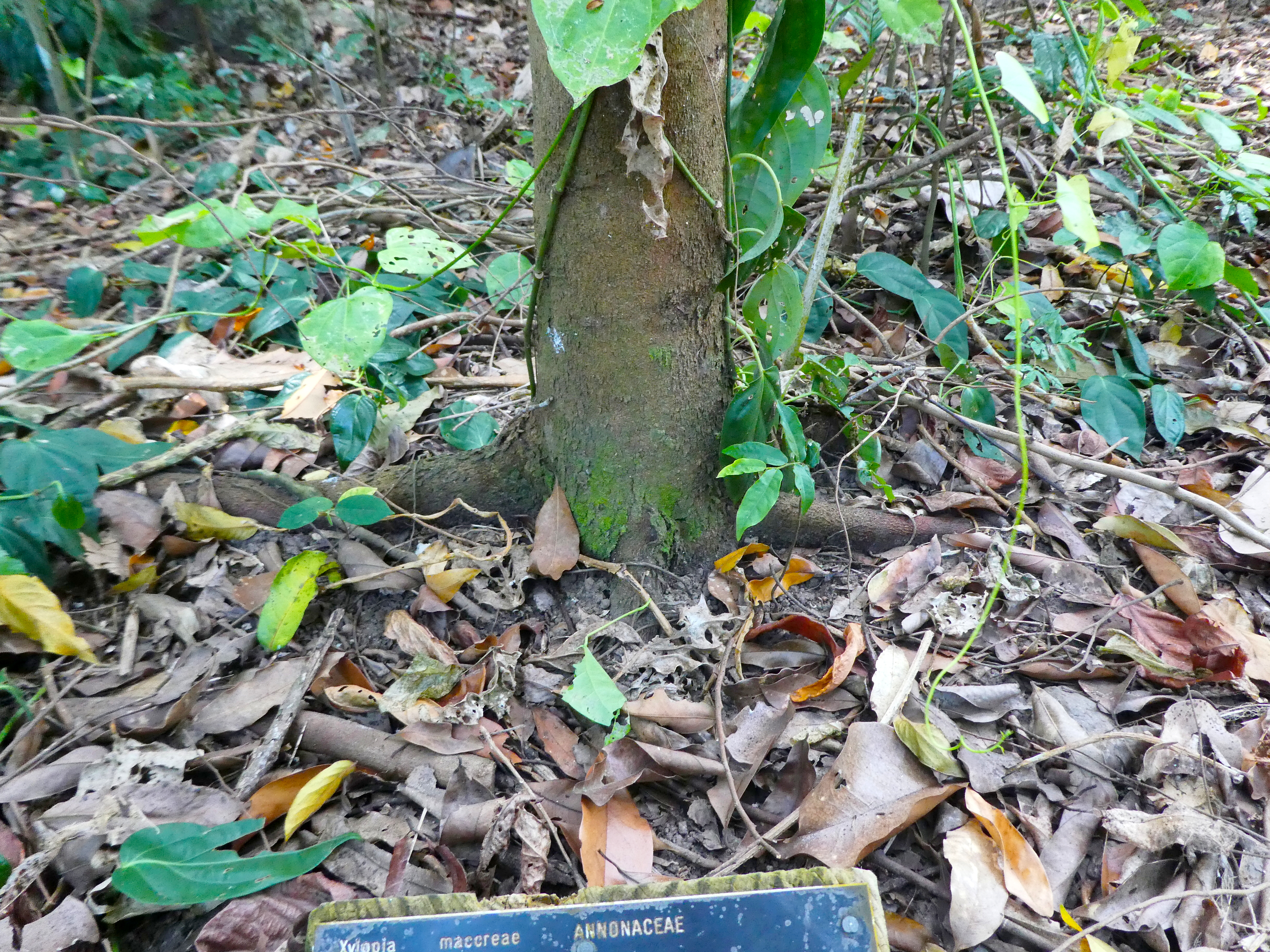
Base of trunk
