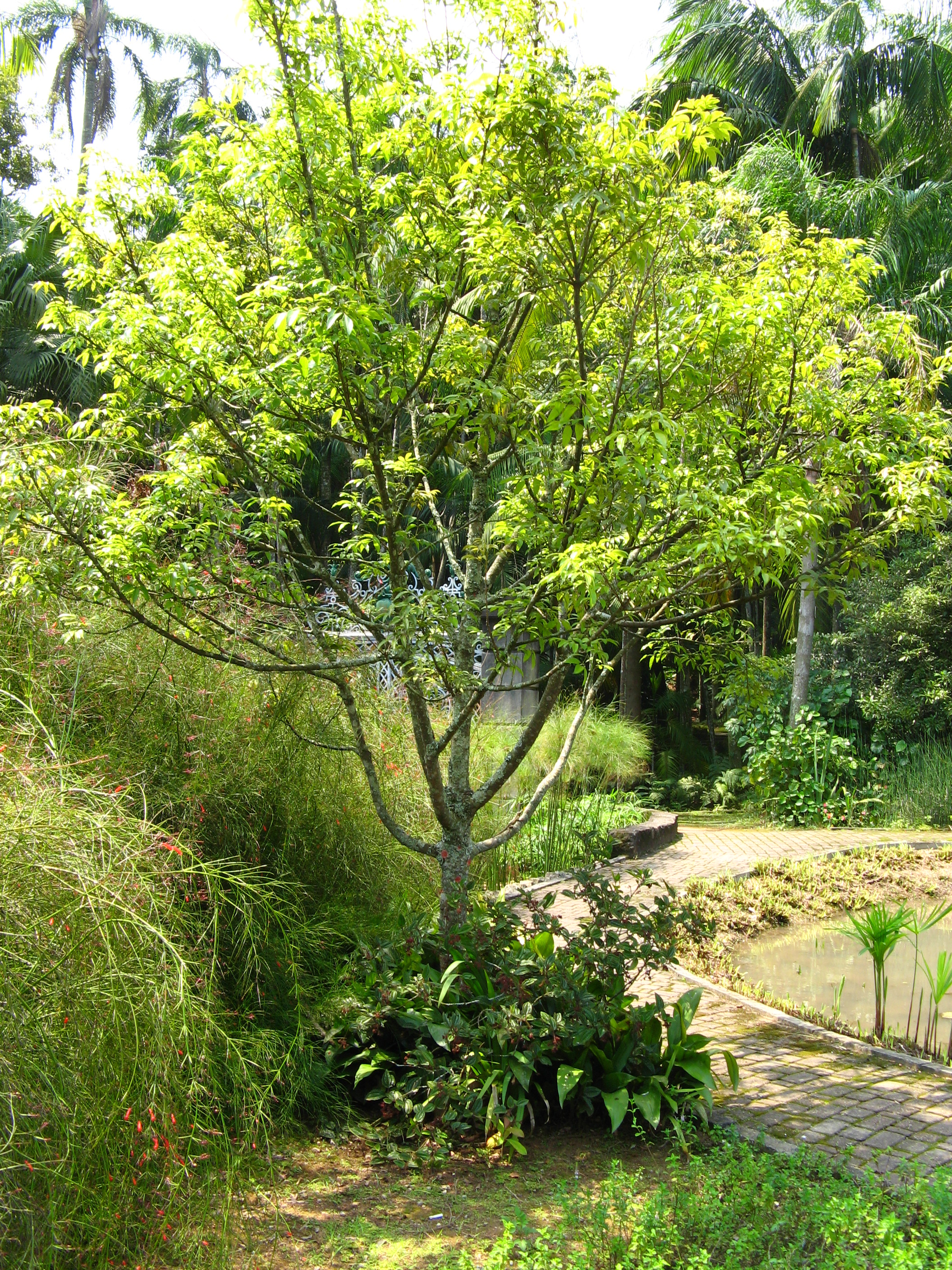

Conservation status
- Vulnerable (IUCN 3.1)

Scientific classification
- Kingdom: Plantae
- Clade: Embryophytes
- Clade: Tracheophytes
- Clade: Spermatophytes
- Clade: Angiosperms
- Clade: Magnoliids
- Order: Magnoliales
- Family: Annonaceae
- Genus: Xylopia
- Species: X. brasiliensis

Binomial name
- Xylopia brasiliensis Spreng.

Synonyms
- Xylopia brasiliensis var. gracilis R.E.Fr.; Xylopia gracilis (R.E.Fr.) R.E.Fr.; Xylopia parvifolia Schltdl.; Xylopicrum brasiliense (Spreng.) Kuntze; Xylopicrum parvifolium (Schltdl.) Kuntze

= Xylopia brasiliensis =

Species of flowering plant

Xylopia brasiliensis, commonly known as pindaíba, is a species of flowering plant in the family Annonaceae.

It is a tree native to Atlantic Forest and Cerrado ecoregions of southeastern and southern Brazil, extending into Misiones Province of northeastern Argentina and Paraguay.
