= Xylopia rubescens =

Conservation status
- Least Concern (IUCN 3.1)

Scientific classification
- Kingdom: Plantae
- Clade: Embryophytes
- Clade: Tracheophytes
- Clade: Spermatophytes
- Clade: Angiosperms
- Clade: Magnoliids
- Order: Magnoliales
- Family: Annonaceae
- Genus: Xylopia
- Species: X. rubescens

Binomial name
- Xylopia rubescens Oliv.

Synonyms
- Xylopia batesii Pierre ex Engl. & Diels; Xylopia butayei De Wild.; Xylopia gossweileri Exell; Xylopia humilis Engl. & Diels; Xylopia klaineana Pierre ex Engl. & Diels; Xylopia rubescens var. klaineana (Pierre ex Engl. & Diels) Pellegr.; Xylopia zenkeri Engl. & Diels; Xylopicrum rubescens (Oliv.) Kuntze

Species of plant

Xylopia rubescens is a tree in the Annonaceae family, it grows up to 30 m tall. Usually found in a wide variety of wetland habitats in Tropical Africa, it is one of the more common of African species within its genus.

== Description ==
Xylopia rubescens has a straight, cylindrical trunk with stilt roots. Its diameter as measured by its d.b.h. can be up to 30 cm. It has large leaves and narrow flower buds. Subcoriaceous, sometimes chartaceous leaf-blades; olive green coloured adaxial surface and orange-brown abaxially. Leaves are oblong, elliptic, or oblanceolate shaped. Species has larger blades, 7.3 -21.3 cm long and 3.6 - 8.4 cm wide, acuminate to cuspidate at apex and cuneate at base.

== Distribution ==
Xylopia rubescens' is endemic to Tropical Africa, its distribution includes Liberia in West Africa to South Sudan in eastern Africa and up to Mozambique in southern Africa. It grows in wet habitats and in a range between sea level and 1690 meters.

== Uses ==
The species in used in the construction of huts.
