= Xylopia pancheri =

Scientific classification
- Kingdom: Plantae
- Clade: Tracheophytes
- Clade: Angiosperms
- Clade: Magnoliids
- Order: Magnoliales
- Family: Annonaceae
- Genus: Xylopia
- Species: X. pancheri

Binomial name
- Xylopia pancheri Baill.

Species of plant

Xylopia pancheri is a species of flowering plant in the family Annonaceae, native to New Caledonia. It occurs in the maquis on ultramafic soils.
