= Xylopia pierrei =

Conservation status
- Near Threatened (IUCN 3.1)

Scientific classification
- Kingdom: Plantae
- Clade: Embryophytes
- Clade: Tracheophytes
- Clade: Spermatophytes
- Clade: Angiosperms
- Clade: Magnoliids
- Order: Magnoliales
- Family: Annonaceae
- Genus: Xylopia
- Species: X. pierrei

Binomial name
- Xylopia pierrei Hance

Synonyms
- Xylopicrum pierrei (Hance) Kuntze

Species of plant

Xylopia pierrei is a tree species in the family Annonaceae. It is native to Thailand, Cambodia, and southern Vietnam.

The species was described by Henry Fletcher Hance in 1877.
