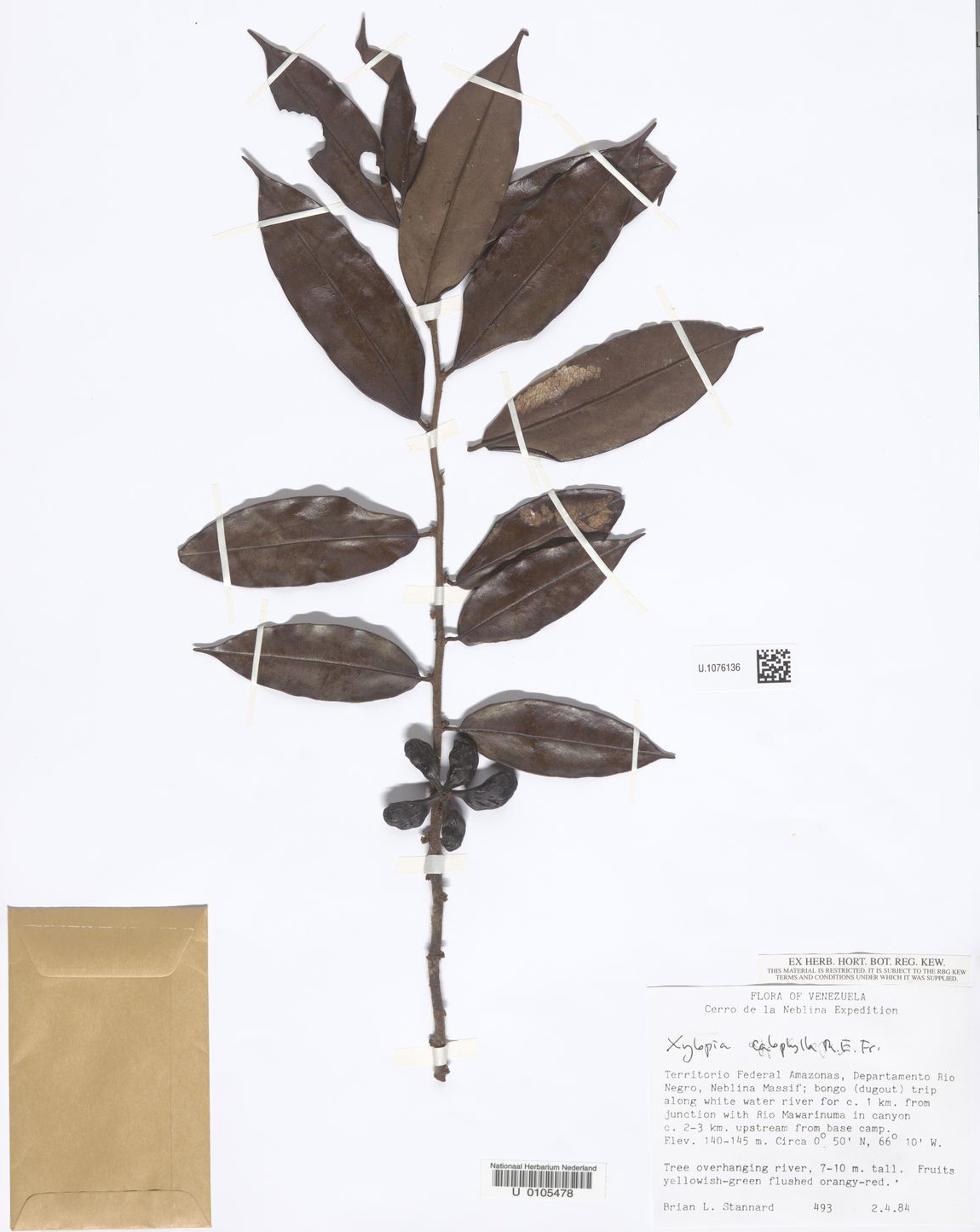
- Herbarium specimen of Xylopia calophylla.

Conservation status
- Least Concern (IUCN 3.1)

Scientific classification
- Kingdom: Plantae
- Clade: Embryophytes
- Clade: Tracheophytes
- Clade: Spermatophytes
- Clade: Angiosperms
- Clade: Magnoliids
- Order: Magnoliales
- Family: Annonaceae
- Genus: Xylopia
- Species: X. calophylla

Binomial name
- Xylopia calophylla R.E.Fr.

= Xylopia calophylla =

Species of flowering plant

Xylopia calophylla is a species of plant in the Annonaceae family. It is native to Bolivia, Brazil, Colombia, Ecuador, Peru and Venezuela. Robert Elias Fries, the botanist who first formally described the species, named it after its beautiful leaves (Latinized forms of Greek καλλι-, calli- and φυλλον, phullon).

== Description ==
It is a medium-sized tree. The young branches are densely covered in soft, silky, rust-colored hairs, but as they mature they become hairless. The branches have reddish bark and often have lenticels. Its elliptical, papery leaves are 8-10 by 2.5-3.5 centimeters. The leaves have short, pointed bases and tapering, somewhat blunted tips, with the tapering portion 5-10 millimeters long. The leaves are differently colored on their upper and lower sides. The upper sides are shiny and hairless. The lower sides are densely covered in silvery hairs that lay flat against the surface. The midribs of the leaves are impressed on their upper surface and very prominent on their lower surface. The leaves have secondary veins that are also impressed on the upper surface and form a network pattern. Its petioles are 5-6 millimeters long, covered in soft hairs, with a groove on their upper side. Its Inflorescences occur in axillary positions. The flowers are on pedicels that are up to 3 millimeters long, packed together in dense groupings, and covered in gold-colored silky hairs. Its flowers have 3 egg-shaped sepals that are 2 by 2 millimeters, with pointed tips. The base of the sepals are fused at their margins. The sepals have silky hairs on their lower surfaces and are hairless on their upper surfaces. Its 6 petals are arranged in two rows of 3. The linear, outer petals are 15-16 by 1.5-2 millimeter with rounded tips. The outer surfaces of the outer petals have gold-colored, silky hairs. The inner petals are shorter and narrower and covered in downy, white hairs except on the base of the inner surface. The flowers have short stamens that are 0.6-0.7 millimeters long with lobed anthers that have 2, or sometimes 3, chambers. The flowers have up to 7 carpels with silky ovaries that are 1 millimeter long. The flowers have thread-like stigma that are 4 millimeters long with styles that are bent at their base.

=== Reproductive biology ===
The pollen of Xylopia calophylla is shed as permanent tetrads.

=== Distribution and habitat ===
It has been observed growing in forests at elevations of 200–300 meters.
