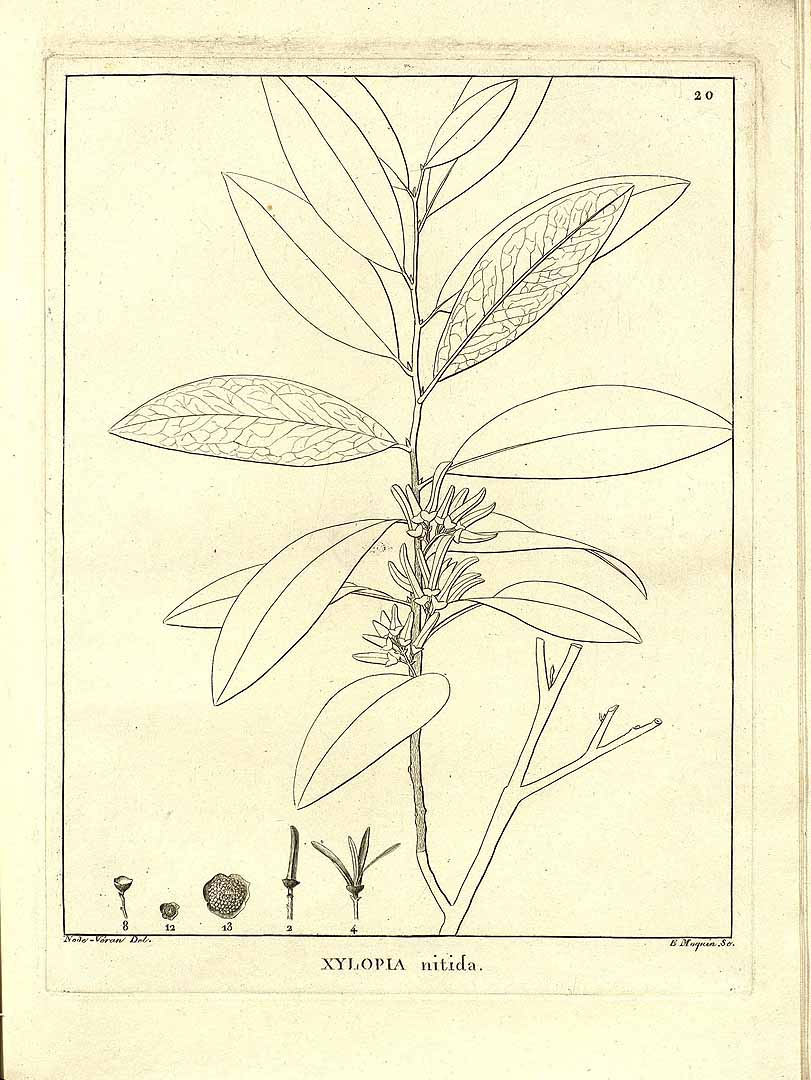
- Botanical illustration of Xylopia nitida

Conservation status
- Least Concern (IUCN 3.1)

Scientific classification
- Kingdom: Plantae
- Clade: Embryophytes
- Clade: Tracheophytes
- Clade: Spermatophytes
- Clade: Angiosperms
- Clade: Magnoliids
- Order: Magnoliales
- Family: Annonaceae
- Genus: Xylopia
- Species: X. nitida

Binomial name
- Xylopia nitida Dunal

Synonyms
- Unona concolor Willd. Uvaria zeylanica Aubl. Waria zeylanica Aubl. Xylopia aromatica Baill. Xylopia cinerea Sandwith; Xylopia nitida var. nervosa R.E.Fr. Xylopicrum nitidum (Dunal) Kuntze

= Xylopia nitida =

Species of flowering plant

Xylopia nitida is a species of plant in the Annonaceae family. It is native to Brazil, Colombia, Ecuador French Guiana, Guyana, Suriname and Venezuela. Michel Félix Dunal, the botanist who first formally described the species, named it after the shiny (nitidus in Latin) upper surface of its leaves.

== Description ==
It is a tree reaching 20 meters in height. The young branches are covered in dense pale brown hairs, but as they mature they become hairless. Its narrow, elliptical, papery leaves are 8.5-13 by 3-4.5 centimeters. The leaves have pointed bases and tapering tips, with the tapering portion 5-10 millimeters long. The leaves are shiny and hairless on their upper surfaces, and have dense, silvery-white to brown hairs that lay flat on their lower surfaces. Its petioles are 2-6 millimeters long. Its Inflorescences occur in the axils of leaves or fallen leaves. Each inflorescence has up to 8 flowers. Each flower is on a pedicel that is 1-13 by 1-3 millimeters. Its flowers have 3 oval to triangular sepals that are 1-2 millimeters long. The lower part of the sepals are fused at their margins to form a cup-shaped calyx that is 4-5 millimeters long. Its 6 petals are arranged in two rows of 3. The orange outer petals are 18-20 by 3-5 millimeter. The orange inner petals are 15 by 1-2 millimeters. Its flowers have 170-270 stamen that are 1-1.5 millimeters long. The stamen are attached to a receptacle that forms a cone that is 1.8-2.2 by 1.2-1.5 millimeters. Its flowers have 20-30 carpels. Its stigma are capped with soft hairs. The hairless, green to red, narrow, cylindrical fruit occur in clusters of 10-27. The fruit are 10-60 millimeters long with longitudinal grooves. Each fruit has 4-6 egg-shaped seeds that are 5-6.5 millimeters long.

=== Reproductive biology ===
The pollen of Xylopia nitida is shed as permanent tetrads.

=== Distribution and habitat ===
It has been observed growing in subtropical forests, tropical moist lowlands, and savanna.

== Uses ==
Its leaf oils contain terpinenes, cymene, and limonene.
