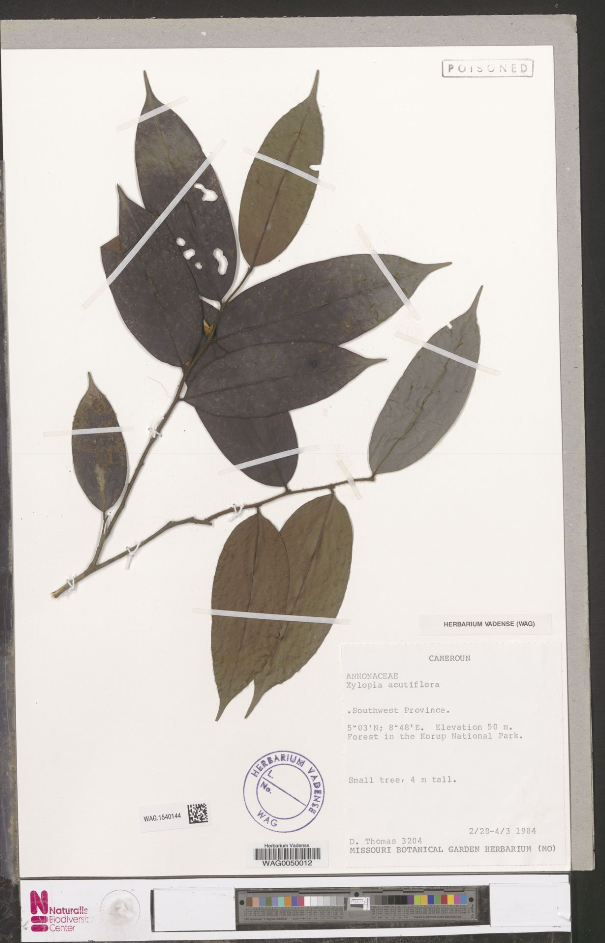

Conservation status
- Data Deficient (IUCN 3.1)

Scientific classification
- Kingdom: Plantae
- Clade: Embryophytes
- Clade: Tracheophytes
- Clade: Spermatophytes
- Clade: Angiosperms
- Clade: Magnoliids
- Order: Magnoliales
- Family: Annonaceae
- Genus: Xylopia
- Species: X. talbotii

Binomial name
- Xylopia talbotii Exell

= Xylopia talbotii =

Species of flowering plant

Xylopia talbotii is a species of plant in the Annonaceae family endemic to Nigeria. It is threatened by habitat loss.
