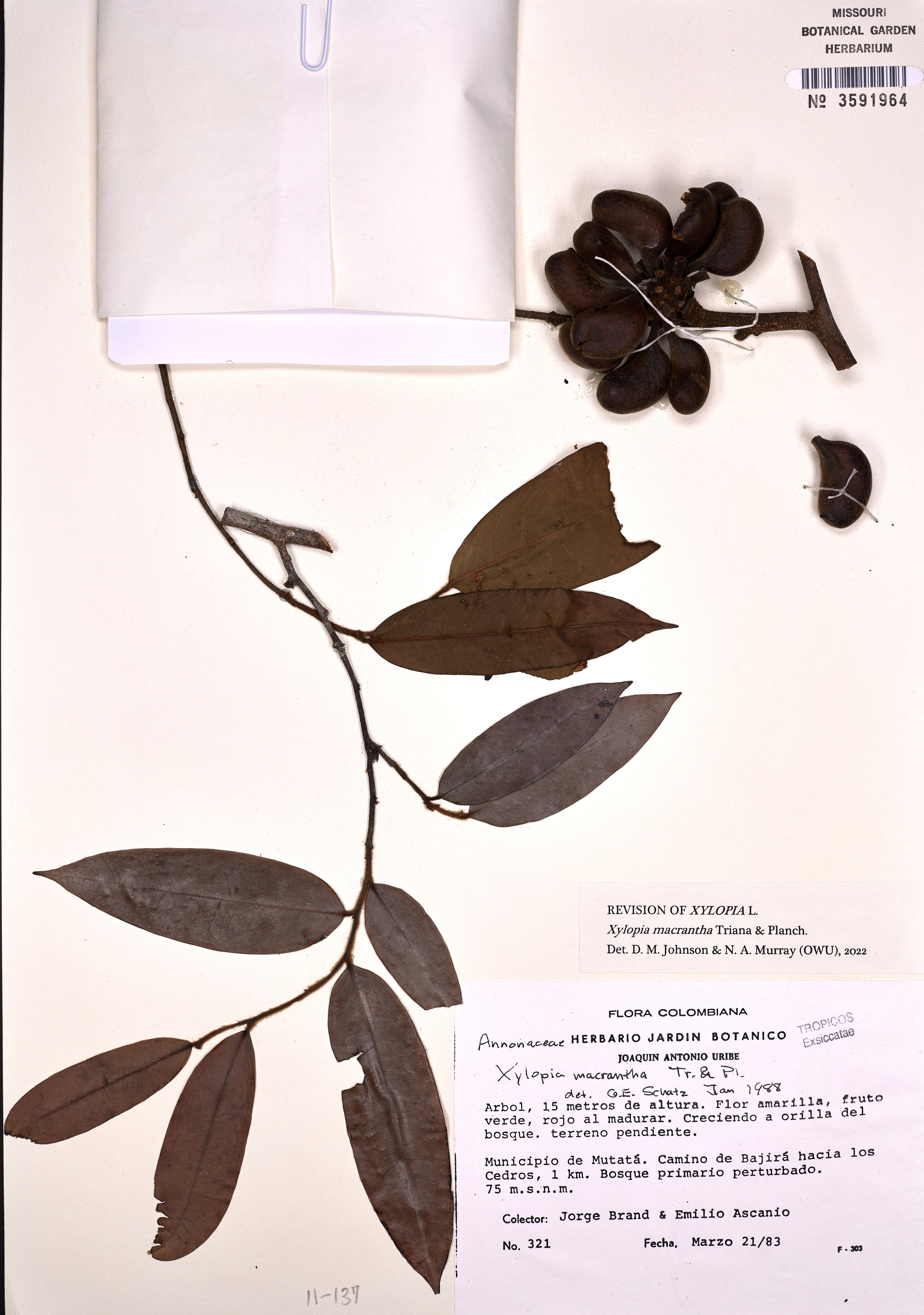
- Herbarium specimen of Xylopia macrantha

Conservation status
- Least Concern (IUCN 3.1)

Scientific classification
- Kingdom: Plantae
- Clade: Embryophytes
- Clade: Tracheophytes
- Clade: Spermatophytes
- Clade: Angiosperms
- Clade: Magnoliids
- Order: Magnoliales
- Family: Annonaceae
- Genus: Xylopia
- Species: X. macrantha

Binomial name
- Xylopia macrantha Triana & Planch.

= Xylopia macrantha =

Species of flowering plant

Xylopia macrantha is a species of plant in the Annonaceae family. It is native to Colombia, Costa Rica and Panama. José Jerónimo Triana and Jules Émile Planchon, the botanists who first formally described the species, named it after its large flowers (Latinized forms of Greek μακρoς, macros and ανθος, anthos).

== Description ==
It is a tree. The young branches are covered in long silky hairs. Its narrow, oblong, leathery leaves are 9-12 by 3-4 centimeters. The bases of the leaves are rounded, and their tips taper to a point. The leaves are shiny and hairless on their upper surfaces. The undersides of the leaves are reddish, particularly near the midrib. The undersides of the leaves have long soft hairs that lay flat. Its petioles are 3-4 millimeters long. Its solitary Inflorescences occur in the axils of leaves on short, 5-6 millimeter long pedicels. Its large flowers have 3 sepals that are fused to form bell-shaped calyx that are 8-10 by 10-11 millimeters. The lobes of the calyx are triangular, covered in silky hairs, and have shallowly pointed tips. Its 6 petals are arranged in two rows of 3. The thick, rigid, oblong outer petals have broad bases and are 20-23 by 8 millimeters. The outer surfaces of the outer petals are covered in soft hairs, their inner surfaces have grey woolly hairs. The inner petals are shaped like a quadrangular prism and have a 3 millimeter diameter. The inner petals have very pointed tips. The flowers have stamen that are 1.5-2 millimeters long. The flowers have about 45 carpels. The flowers have linear ovaries set within cup-shaped receptacles.

=== Reproductive biology ===
The pollen of Xylopia macrantha is shed as permanent tetrads.

=== Distribution and habitat ===
It has been observed growing in tropical rainforests and seasonal forests at elevations of 0-550 meters.
