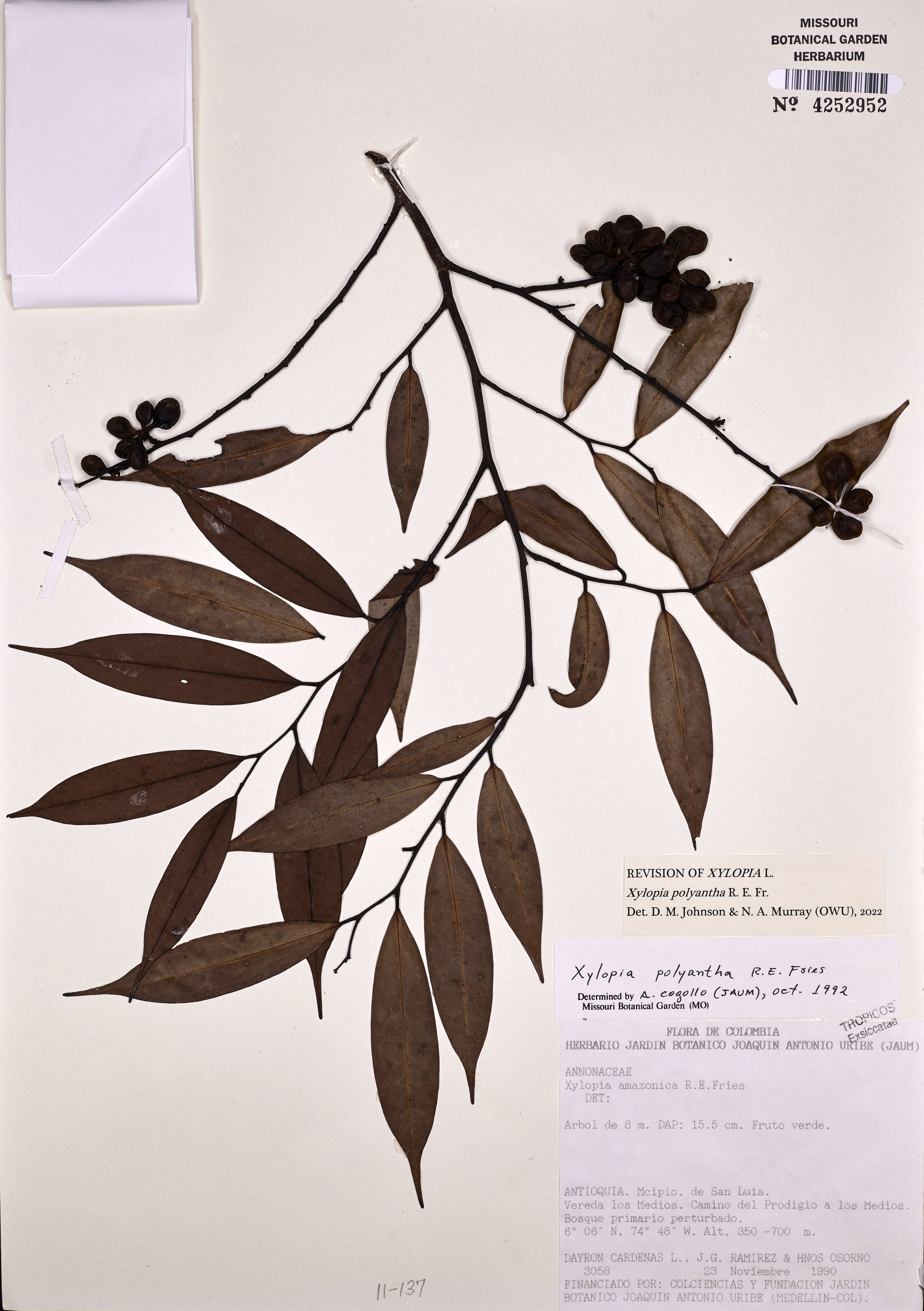
- Herbarium specimen of Xylopia polyantha

Conservation status
- Least Concern (IUCN 3.1)

Scientific classification
- Kingdom: Plantae
- Clade: Tracheophytes
- Clade: Angiosperms
- Clade: Magnoliids
- Order: Magnoliales
- Family: Annonaceae
- Genus: Xylopia
- Species: X. polyantha

Binomial name
- Xylopia polyantha R.E.Fr.

= Xylopia polyantha =

Species of flowering plant

Xylopia polyantha is a species of plant in the Annonaceae family. It is native to Bolivia, Brazil, Colombia, Ecuador, and Peru. Robert Elias Fries, the botanist who first formally described the species, named it after its many flowers (Latinized forms of Greek πολυς, polus; and ανθος, anthos).

== Description ==
It is a tree reaching 15–18 meters in height and 20–25 centimeters in diameter. Its young dark brown branches are densely covered in rust-colored hairs but become hairless with age. The branches often have small white lenticels. The papery, lance-shaped to elliptical leaves are 6–11 by 2–3.5 centimeters. The upper surfaces of the leaves are smooth; the undersides are grey-green, at first densely covered with long silver hairs that lay flat, and then densely covered loose silky hairs. The tips of the leaves come to an abrupt cusp, sometimes notched, about 1 centimeter long. The bases of the leaves come to an uneven point with one side extending further than the other. The leaves' midribs are very impressed on top, projecting below. The leaves have 7–10 pairs of secondary veins emanating from their midribs. The secondary veins merge near the margins of the leaves. Its petioles are 3–6 cm long, often curved, with a groove. The petioles are at first densely covered in rust-colored hairs, but become hairless as they mature. Its Inflorescences occur in axillary positions. Each inflorescence has numerous flowers. Each flower is on a pedicel that is 1–5 millimeters long. The pedicels have hairy, clasping bracts that are 1.5 millimeters long. Its flowers have 3 oval to triangular sepals that are 1–3 millimeters long, with shallowly pointed tips. The lower third to half of the sepals are fused at their margins. The outer surfaces of the sepals are covered in hairs that lay flat. Its 6 fleshy, yellowish petals are arranged in two rows of 3. The linear, outer petals are drawn together at their base, where they are 2 mm wide, then gradually enlarge to become 3 mm wide and 11-18 mm long. The outer surface of the outer petals are covered in silky hairs; the inner surfaces are slightly hairy. The inner petals are 10–15 by 2 millimeters, with rhomboidal and concave bases of a rhombus and very concave inwardly. The inner petals have shallowly pointed tips and are slightly hairy on both sides. The flowers have stamens that are 1 millimeter long. The flowers have up to 11 densely hairy ovaries that are 1 millimeter long. The flowers have thread-like stigma that are 3.5 millimeters long with styles that are bent at their base.The fruit occur in clusters of 5–10. The hairless, globe-shaped to elliptical, slightly curved fruit are 5–15 long. Each fruit typically has 1–3 seeds with an aril covering the base of the seed.

=== Reproductive biology ===
The pollen of Xylopia polyantha is shed as permanent tetrads.

=== Distribution and habitat ===
It has been observed growing in clay soils, in secondary forests at elevations of up to 900 meters.

== Uses ==
It has been recorded as being used in Bolivia for making ropes and in roofing thatch.
