= Xylopia ekmanii =

Conservation status
- Endangered (IUCN 3.1)

Scientific classification
- Kingdom: Plantae
- Clade: Embryophytes
- Clade: Tracheophytes
- Clade: Spermatophytes
- Clade: Angiosperms
- Clade: Magnoliids
- Order: Magnoliales
- Family: Annonaceae
- Genus: Xylopia
- Species: X. ekmanii

Binomial name
- Xylopia ekmanii R.E.Fr.

Species of flowering plant

Xylopia ekmanii is a species of flowering plant in the Annonaceae family. It is a tree endemic to Cuba.
