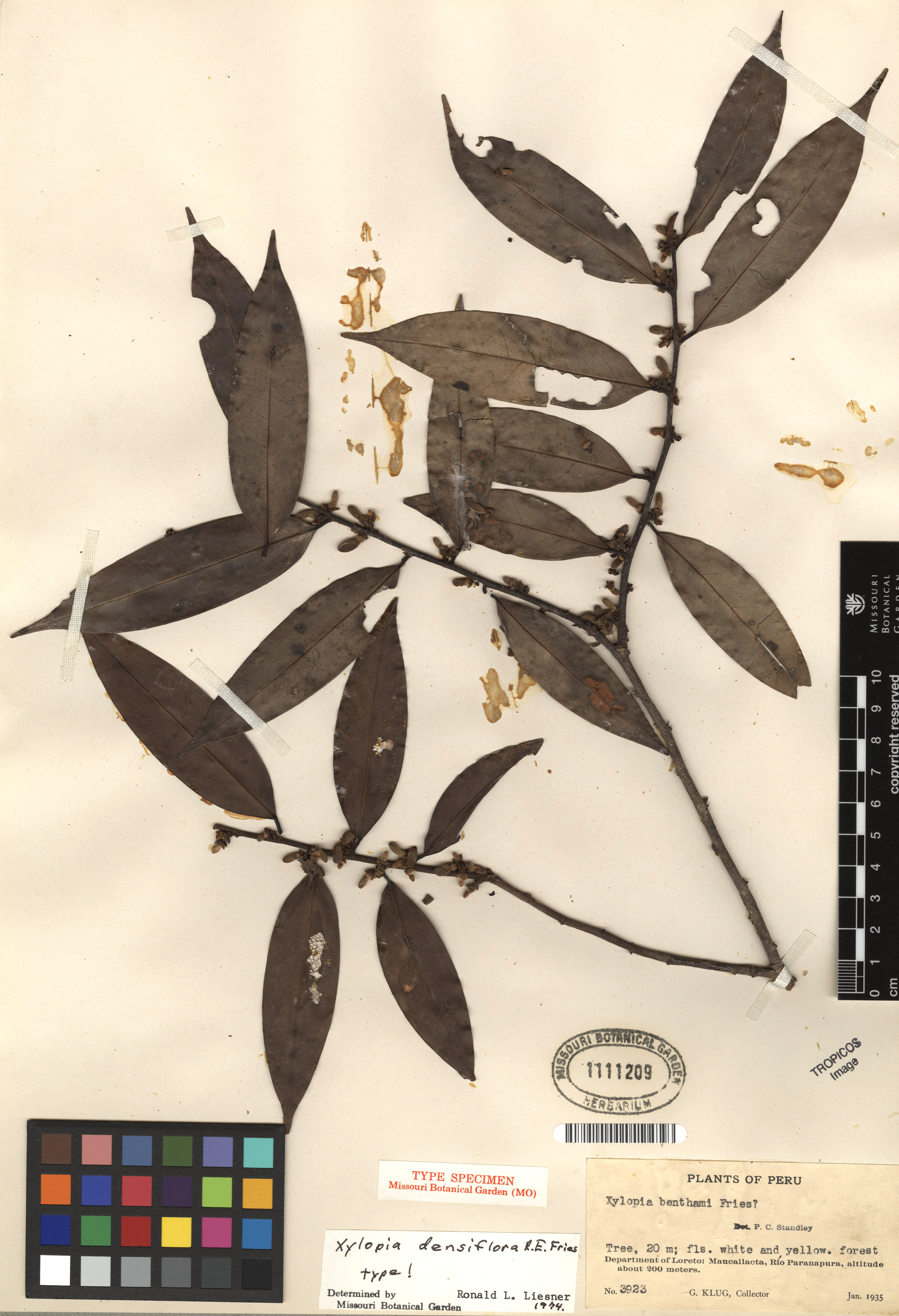
- Herbarium specimen of Xylopia densiflora

Conservation status
- Endangered (IUCN 3.1)

Scientific classification
- Kingdom: Plantae
- Clade: Embryophytes
- Clade: Tracheophytes
- Clade: Spermatophytes
- Clade: Angiosperms
- Clade: Magnoliids
- Order: Magnoliales
- Family: Annonaceae
- Genus: Xylopia
- Species: X. densiflora

Binomial name
- Xylopia densiflora R.E.Fr.

= Xylopia densiflora =

Species of flowering plant

Xylopia densiflora is a species of plant in the Annonaceae family. It is native to Peru. Robert Elias Fries, the botanist who first formally described the species, named it after its dense (densi- in Latin) clusters of flowers.

== Description ==
It is a tree reaching 20 meters in height. The young branches are covered in coarse hairs that lay flat. Its lance-shaped, papery leaves are 7-10 by 2-2.5 centimeters. The leaves have gradually pointed bases and gradually narrowing tips. The leaves are hairless on their upper surfaces, and have long soft hairs that lay flat on their lower surfaces. Its petioles are 5-6 millimeters long. It has numerous densely clustered flowers. Its flowers have 3 oval sepals that have silky hairs on their outer surface. The sepals are 2-2.5 millimeters long. Its flower buds are shaped like rounded triangles. Its 6 petals are arranged in two rows of 3. The oblong, outer petals are 8-10 millimeters long and covered in grey, silky hairs on their outer surface.The linear to club-shaped to triangular, inner petals are about 9 millimeters long. The flowers have stamens that are 0.7-0.8 millimeters long. The flowers have up to 5 carpels. The styles bent, knee-like shape. The carpels have 2 millimeters long, hairless stigmas.

=== Reproductive biology ===
The pollen of Xylopia densiflora is shed as permanent tetrads.

=== Distribution and habitat ===
It has been observed growing in forests at elevations of 200 meters.
