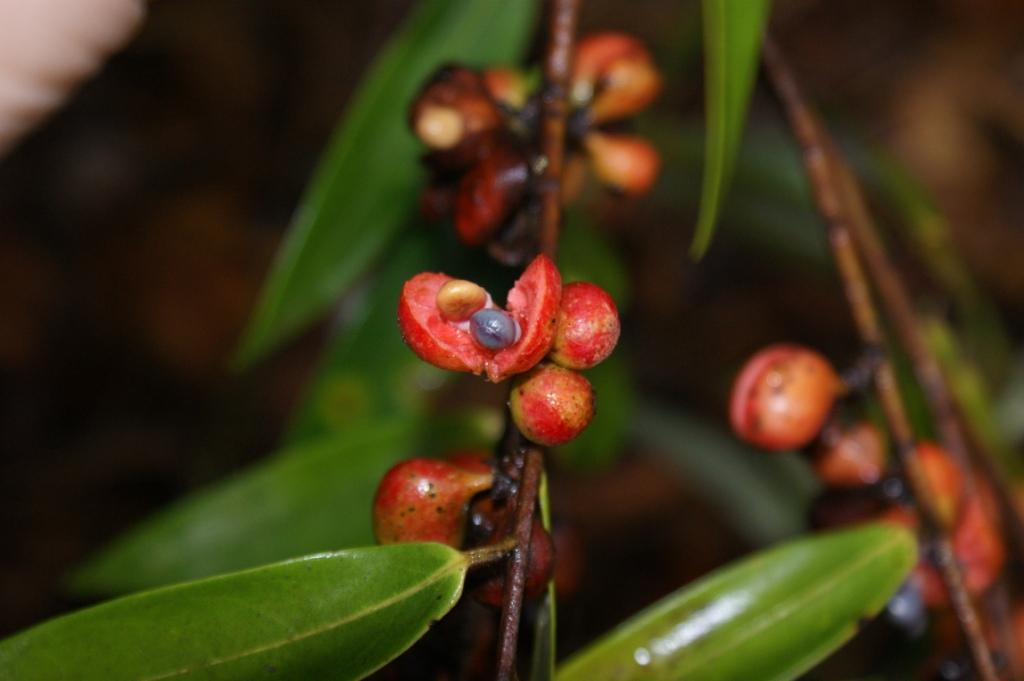

Conservation status
- Least Concern (IUCN 3.1)

Scientific classification
- Kingdom: Plantae
- Clade: Embryophytes
- Clade: Tracheophytes
- Clade: Spermatophytes
- Clade: Angiosperms
- Clade: Magnoliids
- Order: Magnoliales
- Family: Annonaceae
- Genus: Xylopia
- Species: X. sericea

Binomial name
- Xylopia sericea A.St.-Hil.

Synonyms
- Mayna sericea Spreng.; Unona carminativa Arruda; Unona fluminensis Vell.; Uvaria fluminensis Vell.; Xylopia carminativa (Arruda) R.E.Fr.; Xylopia intermedia R.E.Fr.; Xylopicrum carminativum (Arruda) Kuntze

= Xylopia sericea =

Species of flowering plant

Xylopia sericea is a species of flowering plant in the Annonaceae family. It is a shrub or tree native to the tropical Americas, ranging from southern Nicaragua to Bolivia and southern Brazil, including the Cerrado ecoregion of Brazil.
