= Xylopia acutiflora =

Conservation status
- Least Concern (IUCN 3.1)

Scientific classification
- Kingdom: Plantae
- Clade: Embryophytes
- Clade: Tracheophytes
- Clade: Spermatophytes
- Clade: Angiosperms
- Clade: Magnoliids
- Order: Magnoliales
- Family: Annonaceae
- Genus: Xylopia
- Species: X. acutiflora

Binomial name
- Xylopia acutiflora (Dunal) A.Rich.

Synonyms
- Coelocline acutiflora (Dunal) A.DC.; Coelocline oxypetala (DC.) A.DC.; Unona acutiflora Dunal; Unona oxypetala DC.; Xylopia dunaliana Vallot; Xylopia oxypetala (DC.) Oliv. ex Engl. & Diels; Xylopiastrum taiense Aubrév.; Xylopicrum acutiflorum (Dunal) Kuntze

Species of plant

Xylopia acutiflora is a species of flowering plant in the Annonaceae family. It is small tree that grows up to 15 m high. It is native to Guinea, Sierra Leone, Liberia, and western Côte d'Ivoire in west Africa.

== Description ==
Brown pubescent twigs mixed with erect and short hairs. Leaf blades chartaceous, concolorous–slightly discolorous, elliptic–elliptic-lanceolate, larger blades, 5.3 - 11.7 cm long and 2.3 - 4.3 cm wide; acute to acuminate at apex and cuneate at base. Flowers are solitary Fruit green - reddish tinged exterior, scarlet endocarp, up to born on a pedicel. Seed, ovate- ellipsoid, monocarps have two rows of seed.

== Distribution ==
It is native to Guinea, Sierra Leone, Liberia, and western Côte d'Ivoire, where it grows in lowland moist forests.

== Uses ==
In Ghana and among the Ehotile people of Akanland, root extracts from the species is used as a sexual stimulant and as a chewing stick. Seeds are crushed and used as spice, wood obtained are used as material to make canoe paddles, spears or bows.
