= Xylopia sericolampra =

Conservation status
- Endangered (IUCN 3.1)

Scientific classification
- Kingdom: Plantae
- Clade: Embryophytes
- Clade: Tracheophytes
- Clade: Spermatophytes
- Clade: Angiosperms
- Clade: Magnoliids
- Order: Magnoliales
- Family: Annonaceae
- Genus: Xylopia
- Species: X. sericolampra

Binomial name
- Xylopia sericolampra Diels

Species of flowering plant

Xylopia sericolampra is a species of flowering plant in the family Annonaceae. It is a tree endemic to northwestern Madagascar.

The species was described by Friedrich Ludwig Diels in 1927.
