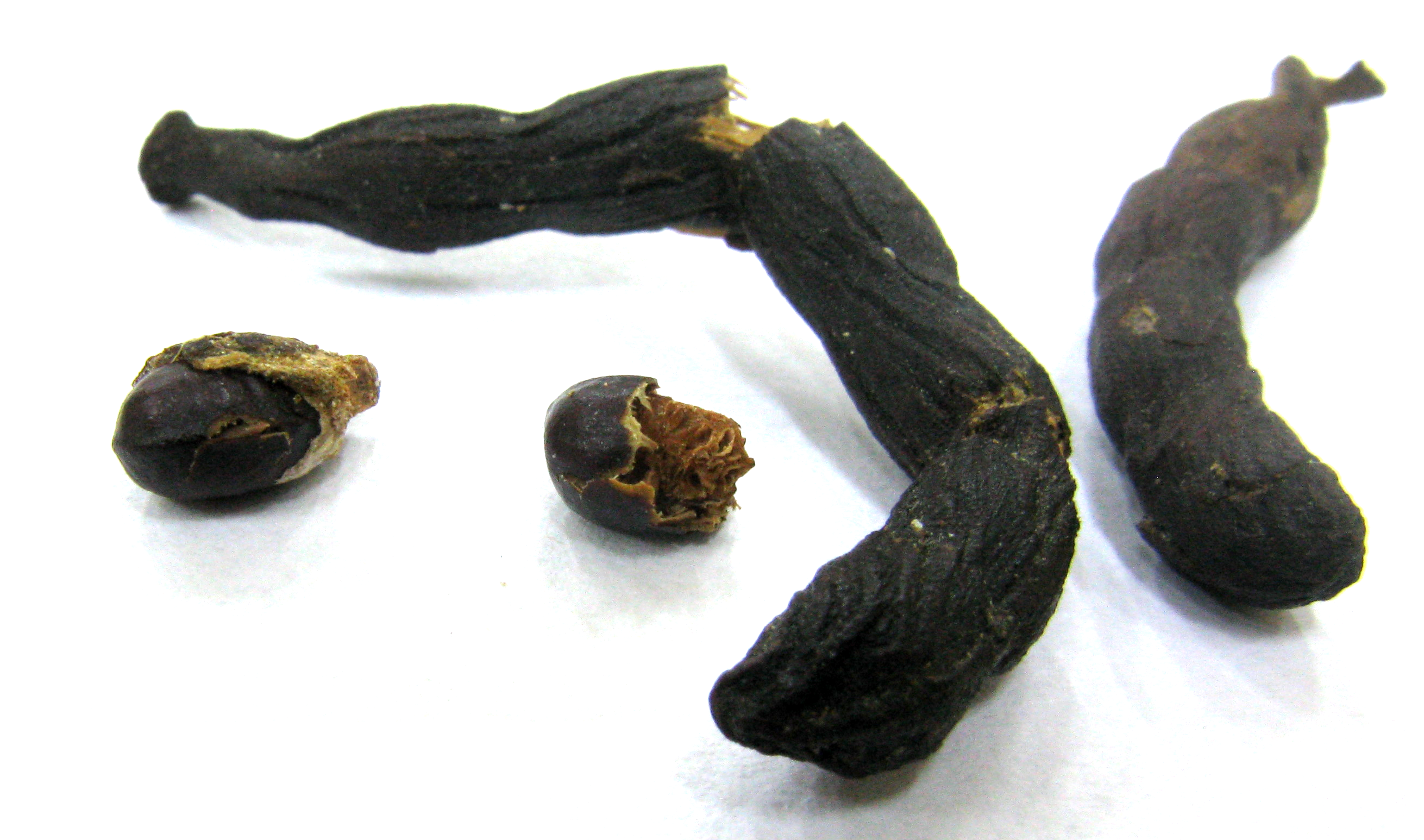
- Xylopia africana seed pods

Conservation status
- Vulnerable (IUCN 3.1)

Scientific classification
- Kingdom: Plantae
- Clade: Tracheophytes
- Clade: Angiosperms
- Clade: Magnoliids
- Order: Magnoliales
- Family: Annonaceae
- Genus: Xylopia
- Species: X. africana

Binomial name
- Xylopia africana (Benth.) Oliv.

Synonyms
- Melodorum africanum Benth.; Xylopicrum africanum (Oliv.) Kuntze

= Xylopia africana =

Species of flowering plant

Xylopia africana is a species of plant in the Annonaceae family. It is found in west-central Africa. It is restricted to submontane and lower montane forests. It is threatened due to habitat loss by clearance of forest. It was first described as Melodorum africanum in 1862 by George Bentham.

== Description ==
The tree Xylopia africana is up to 20 metres tall, DBH 30 cm. It has yellow to yellow-orange flowers. Its seed pods are 6.6-10.5 cm long and contain up to 5 seeds.

== Distribution ==
Xylopia africana grows in montane and submontane mossy forests at elevations of 900–2000 m. It occurs in southeastern Nigeria (Obudu), western Cameroon (Mount Cameroon, Bakossi, Rumpi Hills, Fosimondi, Bali Ngemba), São Tomé and Príncipe (São Tomé Island) and Equatorial Guinea (Bioko island).
