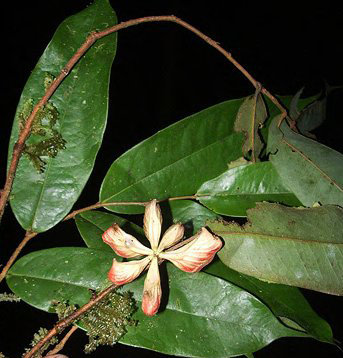
- Photograph of Xylopia cuspidata with flower

Conservation status
- Least Concern (IUCN 3.1)

Scientific classification
- Kingdom: Plantae
- Clade: Embryophytes
- Clade: Tracheophytes
- Clade: Spermatophytes
- Clade: Angiosperms
- Clade: Magnoliids
- Order: Magnoliales
- Family: Annonaceae
- Genus: Xylopia
- Species: X. cuspidata

Binomial name
- Xylopia cuspidata Diels

Synonyms
- Uvaria febrifuga Humb. & Bonpl. ex DC. Xylopia poeppigii R.E.Fr.

= Xylopia cuspidata =

Species of flowering plant

Xylopia cuspidata is a species of plant in the Annonaceae family. It is native to Bolivia, Brazil, Colombia, Ecuador and Peru. Ludwig Diels, the botanist who first formally described the species, named it after the leaves which have an abruptly pointed tip (cuspidatus in Latin).

== Description ==
It is a large tree. The young rust-colored branches are hairy, but as their bark becomes dark brown. Its elliptical to oblong, papery leaves are 15–25 by 7–9 centimeters. The leaves have rounded to slightly tapering bases and rounded tips that terminate in a 3–4 centimeter-long pointed cusp. The leaves are hairless on their upper surfaces, and have soft hairs that lay flat on their lower surfaces. The leaves have 10 pairs of secondary veins emanating from their midribs. Its petioles are 3–6 millimeters long. Its Inflorescences occur in the axils of fallen leaves. Each inflorescence has 1 flower. Each flower is on a pedicel that is 6–7 millimeters long and covered in rust-colored hairs. The pedicels have bracts. Its flowers have 3 green, slightly membranous, sepals. The lower portion of the sepals are fused to form a 3–4 millimeter cup-shaped structure with 3 minute lobes. The sepals are covered in rust-colored hairs. Its 6 petals are arranged in two rows of 3. The pale yellow, triangular to egg-shaped, outer petals are 5 by 8 millimeters with pointed tips. The outer surface of the outer petals are covered in silky hairs. The pale yellow, lance-shaped inner petals are 12.5 by 6.5 millimeters. The flowers have pale yellow stamens. The flowers have numerous hairy carpels with 4–5 ovules. The carpels have club-shaped styles that are 4–5 millimeters long, and hairless stigmas that are held together by a glutinous exudate.

=== Reproductive biology ===
The pollen of Xylopia cuspidata is shed as permanent tetrads.

=== Distribution and habitat ===
It has been observed growing in high forests and bushlands at elevations of 110 meters.

== Uses ==
Based on interviews with traditional healers in Peru extracts from the bark and leaves have been recorded as being used to treat rheumatism.
