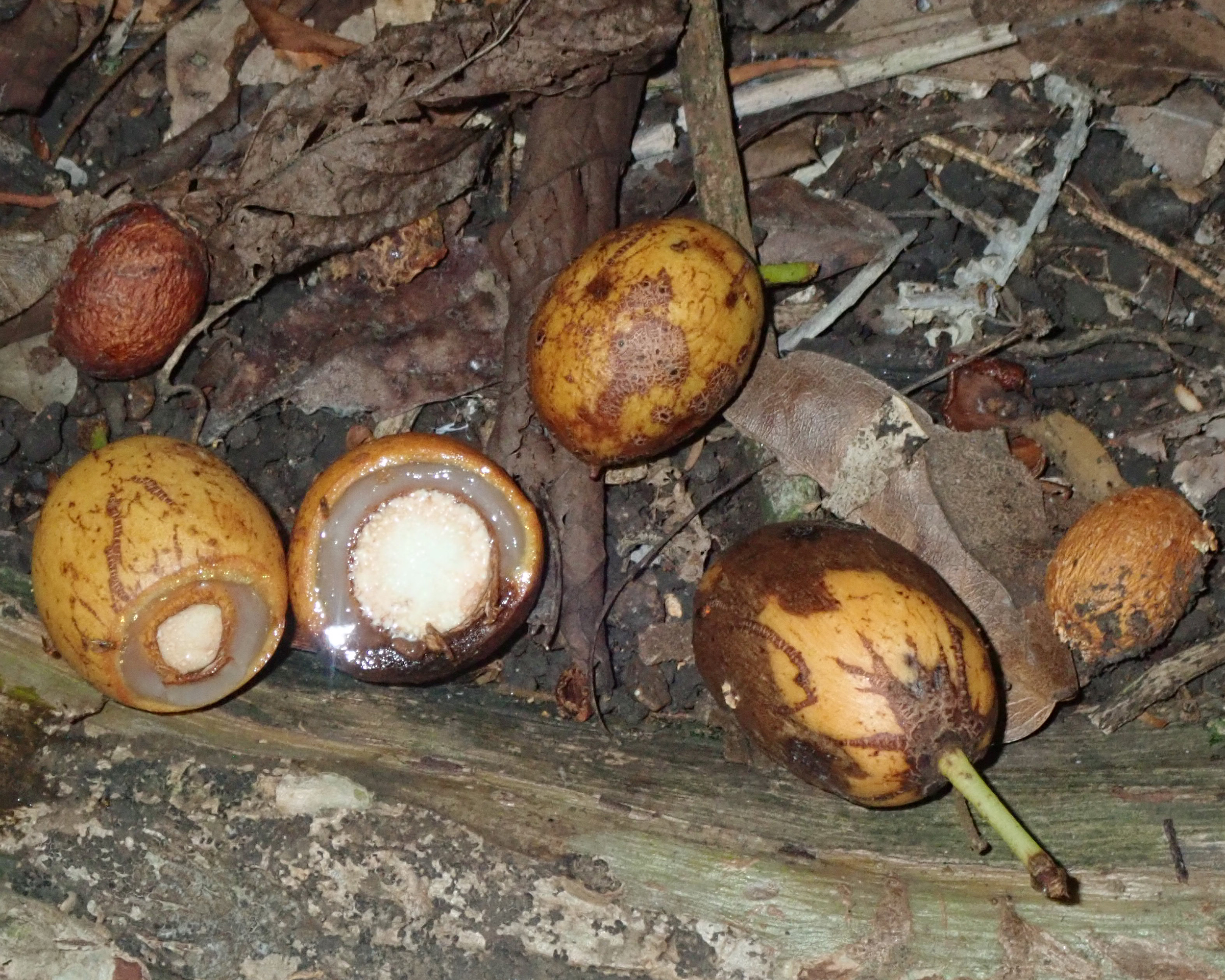
- Fruit & seeds (May: Cat Tien National Park)

Conservation status
- Least Concern (IUCN 3.1)

Scientific classification
- Kingdom: Plantae
- Clade: Embryophytes
- Clade: Tracheophytes
- Clade: Spermatophytes
- Clade: Angiosperms
- Clade: Magnoliids
- Order: Magnoliales
- Family: Annonaceae
- Genus: Xylopia
- Species: X. vielana

Binomial name
- Xylopia vielana Pierre

Synonyms
- Xylopicrum vielanum (Pierre.) Kuntze

= Xylopia vielana =

Species of tree

Xylopia vielana is a tree species described by Jean Baptiste Louis Pierre; it is included in the genus Xylopia and family Annonaceae. No subspecies are listed in the Catalogue of Life.

== Distribution ==
Xylopia vielana can be found in the tropical seasonal forests of Asia, up to 700 metres elevation. Its distribution includes Cambodia, Laos, Thailand, Vietnam (where its name is giên đỏ), and south-east China (southern Guangxi). It flowers from March to June, and fruits from July to October.

== Description ==
Xylopia vielana is an evergreen tree up to 20 m high, with dark brown bark and tomentose branches. Leaves are ovate to elliptic (long: 30–70 mm, broad: 15–30 mm), more or less pubescent, obtuse to rounded base, obtuse apex with short acuminate; the 40–80 mm petiole is sometimes pubescent. Flowers are solitary, axillary and perfumed, with a diameter of 20 mm; sepals are oval (4 mm long), and tomentose like the petals (15 mm long), the internals being linear lanceolate (14 mm long) with pubescent carpels (4 mm long). Fruits are composed of oblong carpels (long: 25–35 mm, broad: 10 mm).
