= Xylopia lamarckii =

Conservation status
- Critically Endangered (IUCN 2.3)

Scientific classification
- Kingdom: Plantae
- Clade: Tracheophytes
- Clade: Angiosperms
- Clade: Magnoliids
- Order: Magnoliales
- Family: Annonaceae
- Genus: Xylopia
- Species: X. lamarckii

Binomial name
- Xylopia lamarckii Baill.

Species of flowering plant

Xylopia lamarckii is a species of flowering plant in the Annonaceae family. It is a shrub or tree endemic to Mauritius. It is threatened by habitat loss.
