= Xylopia richardii =

Conservation status
- Vulnerable (IUCN 2.3)

Scientific classification
- Kingdom: Plantae
- Clade: Embryophytes
- Clade: Tracheophytes
- Clade: Spermatophytes
- Clade: Angiosperms
- Clade: Magnoliids
- Order: Magnoliales
- Family: Annonaceae
- Genus: Xylopia
- Species: X. richardii

Binomial name
- Xylopia richardii Boivin ex Baill.

Synonyms
- Annona aromatica Bojer; Xylopicrum richardii (Boivin ex Baill.) Kuntze

Species of flowering plant

Xylopia richardii is a species of flowering plant in the Annonaceae family. It is a tree native to Mauritius and Réunion. It is threatened by habitat loss, and the IUCN Red List assesses the species as Vulnerable.
