= Xylopia championii =

Conservation status
- Least Concern (IUCN 3.1)

Scientific classification
- Kingdom: Plantae
- Clade: Tracheophytes
- Clade: Angiosperms
- Clade: Magnoliids
- Order: Magnoliales
- Family: Annonaceae
- Genus: Xylopia
- Species: X. championii

Binomial name
- Xylopia championii Hook.f. & Thomson

Synonyms
- Xylopicrum championii (Hook.f. & Thomson) Kuntze

Species of flowering plant

Xylopia championii is a species of flowering plant in the Annonaceae family. It is a tree endemic to southwestern Sri Lanka. It is known as අතු කැටිය (athu ketiya) or දත් කැටිය (dath ketiya) in Sinhala. It is a small tree, and its flowers are pollinated by a species of Endaeus weevil. It grows in the understory of lowland rain forest.
