= Xylopia benthamii =

Conservation status
- Least Concern (IUCN 3.1)

Scientific classification
- Kingdom: Plantae
- Clade: Embryophytes
- Clade: Tracheophytes
- Clade: Spermatophytes
- Clade: Angiosperms
- Clade: Magnoliids
- Order: Magnoliales
- Family: Annonaceae
- Genus: Xylopia
- Species: X. benthamii

Binomial name
- Xylopia benthamii R.E.Fr.

Synonyms
- Xylopia benthamii var. dolichopetala R.E.Fr.; Xylopia benthamii var. subnuda R.E.Fr.; Xylopia ulei Diels

Species of plant

Xylopia benthamii is a species of flowering plant of the genus Xylopia, described by Robert Elias Fries in 1900. It contains one subspecies: Xylopia benthamii dolichopetala. The species is native to Venezuela, Peru, Brazil and Bolivia.

== Description ==
Xylopia benthamii is evergreen, growing up to 25 cm in height. The branches are hairy. The leaves are lanceolate in shape and measure 8 to 11 cm in length and 2.5 to 3 cm in width with hairs underneath when young then become hairless.

The flowers are cup shaped and grow in clusters. They are up to 5mm in length and 8mm in diameter, with the outer lance-shaped petal growing from 2.8 to 4 cm in length.

The fruit are an oblong shape and measure 3 to 3.5 cm long, 1.3 cm wide and 0.8 cm thick. They contain up to 8 oval seeds measuring 1 cm in diameter.

== Uses ==
The fruit of the plant is used to relieve stomach ache. The bark is used to make ropes and the wood is used for construction.
