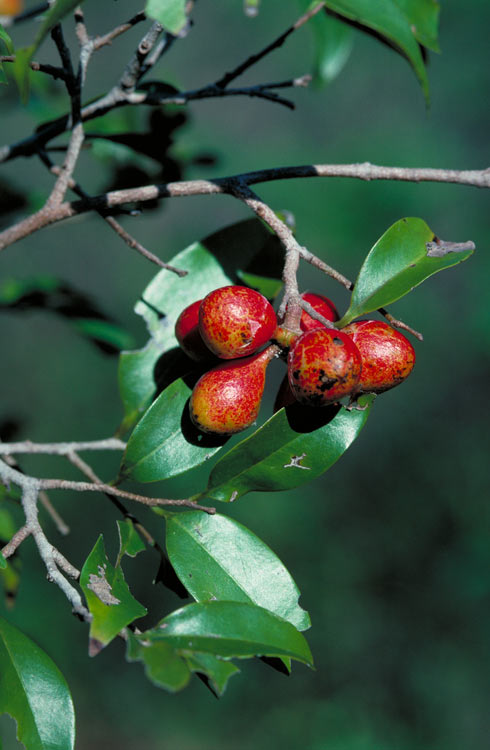
- Fruit

Conservation status
- Endangered (NCA)

Scientific classification
- Kingdom: Plantae
- Clade: Tracheophytes
- Clade: Angiosperms
- Clade: Magnoliids
- Order: Magnoliales
- Family: Annonaceae
- Genus: Xylopia
- Species: X. monosperma

Binomial name
- Xylopia monosperma Jessup

= Xylopia monosperma =

Species of flowering plant

Xylopia monosperma is a species of plant in the custard apple family Annonaceae endemic to Australia. It has two disjunct populations, one in the far northern part of Cape York Peninsula in Queensland, and the other in the Tiwi Islands in the Northern Territory. It is a small tree to about 10 m (33 ft) tall which inhabits vine thickets and open forest at altitudes up about 100 m (330 ft). It is a host plant for larvae of the green spotted triangle butterfly.
