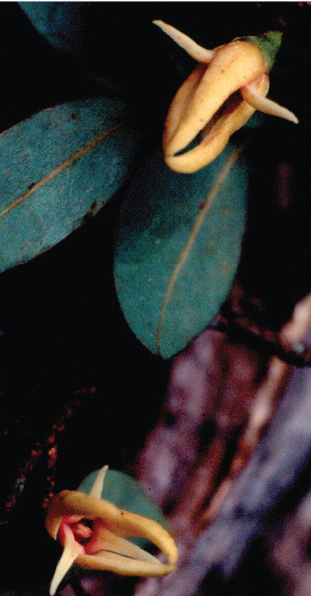
- Color photograph of Xylopia arenaria

Conservation status
- Vulnerable (IUCN 3.1)

Scientific classification
- Kingdom: Plantae
- Clade: Embryophytes
- Clade: Tracheophytes
- Clade: Spermatophytes
- Clade: Angiosperms
- Clade: Magnoliids
- Order: Magnoliales
- Family: Annonaceae
- Genus: Xylopia
- Species: X. arenaria

Binomial name
- Xylopia arenaria Engl.

= Xylopia arenaria =

Species of flowering plant

Xylopia arenaria is a species of plant in the Annonaceae family. It is native to Kenya, and Tanzania. Adolf Engler, the botanist who first formally described the species, named it after its growth in sandy places (arenaria in Latin).

== Description ==
It is a shrub or tree reaching 6 meters in height. The young, red-brown to grey branches are hairy, but as they mature they become hairless and their bark peels and flakes. Its egg-shaped to lance-shaped, papery to slightly leathery leaves are 3.4-7 by 1.5-2.5 centimeters. The leaves have wedge-shaped to rounded to slightly heart-shaped bases and pointed to blunt tips. The leaves are hairless on their upper surfaces, and have soft hairs that lay flat on their lower surfaces. The leaves have 7-12 pairs of secondary veins emanating from their midribs. Its petioles are 2.5-5 millimeters long, and covered in soft hairs, with a shallow groove on their upper side. Its Inflorescences occur in the axils of leaves or fallen leaves. Each inflorescence has 1-2 flower. Each flower is on a hairy pedicel that is 1.8-3.5 by 0.7-1.3 millimeters. The pedicels have 3 oval to crescent-shaped, evenly spaced bracts that are 0.5-1.6 millimeters long. The upper two bracts can be bi-lobed. The tips of the bracts are pointed to blunt. Its flowers have 3 egg-shaped, leathery sepals that are 2.2-2.5 by 2.1-1.7 millimeters, with pointed tips. The lower third to half of the sepals are fused at their margins. The sepals are hairy on their lower surfaces. Its 6 petals are arranged in two rows of 3. The white to pale yellow-orange, lance-shaped, leathery to slightly fleshy, outer petals are 6.6-10.2 by 2.7-3.2 millimeter with pointed tips. The upper surface of the outer petals are densely covered in soft hairs except at their base, and the lower surfaces are densely covered in soft hairs that lay flat. The lance-shaped, slightly fleshy inner petals are white to pale yellow-orange on their outer surface and purple to red at the base of the inner surface. The inner petals are 4.7-7.2 by 1.8-2.7 millimeters. The inner petals are slightly hairy on their upper and lower surfaces except at their base. The tips of the inner petals are bent sharply outward between the outer petals. The flowers have 70-200 stamens that are 1.0-1.2 millimeters long. The tissue connecting the chambers of the anthers extends to form purple-red, truncated to pin-like caps that are 0.1-0.3 millimeters long and overhang the anthers. The anthers have 12-18 chambers. The flowers also have inner and outer sterile stamens. The club-shaped to oblong outer sterile stamens are 1.0-1.2 millimeters long with pointed to blunt to flat tips. The oblong inner sterile stamens are 0.8-0.9 millimeters long with pointed to blunt to flat tips. The flowers' receptacle that the stamens attach are attached to form a cone that is 1.4-1.6 by 0.9-1.2 millimeters. The flowers have 6-11 carpels with silky, oblong ovaries that are 1 millimeter long. The carpels have trowel-shaped stigma that are up to 2.3 millimeters long and drawn together at their tips. The tips of the stigmas have tufts of hair. The fruit occur in clusters of up to 4 on pedicles that are 4.2-5.3 by 1.2-1.6 millimeters. The oblong to slightly cylindrical, light green fruit are 1.3-2.5 by 0.5-1.2 by 0.5-0.7 centimeters. The tips of the fruit are rounded and have blunt beaks that are 1.2 millimeters long. The base of the fruit are narrowed into a 3-5 by 1.5-2.1 millimeter stipe. The surface of the fruit is smooth or slightly warty. The fruit have scarlet interior flesh. Each fruit has up to 3 pear-shaped, dark brown, smooth, shiny, seeds that are elliptical in cross-section and 9.2-9.8 by 5.3-5.8 by 4.5-6.3 millimeters. The seeds are arranged in a single row. The seeds have a bright orange fleshy coat.

=== Reproductive biology ===
The pollen of Xylopia arenaria is shed as permanent tetrads.

=== Distribution and habitat ===
It has been observed growing in sandy soil in forests and bushlands at elevations of 30-500 meters.

== Uses ==
Based on interviews with traditional healers in Tanzania extracts from the root have been recorded as being used to treat epilepsy.
