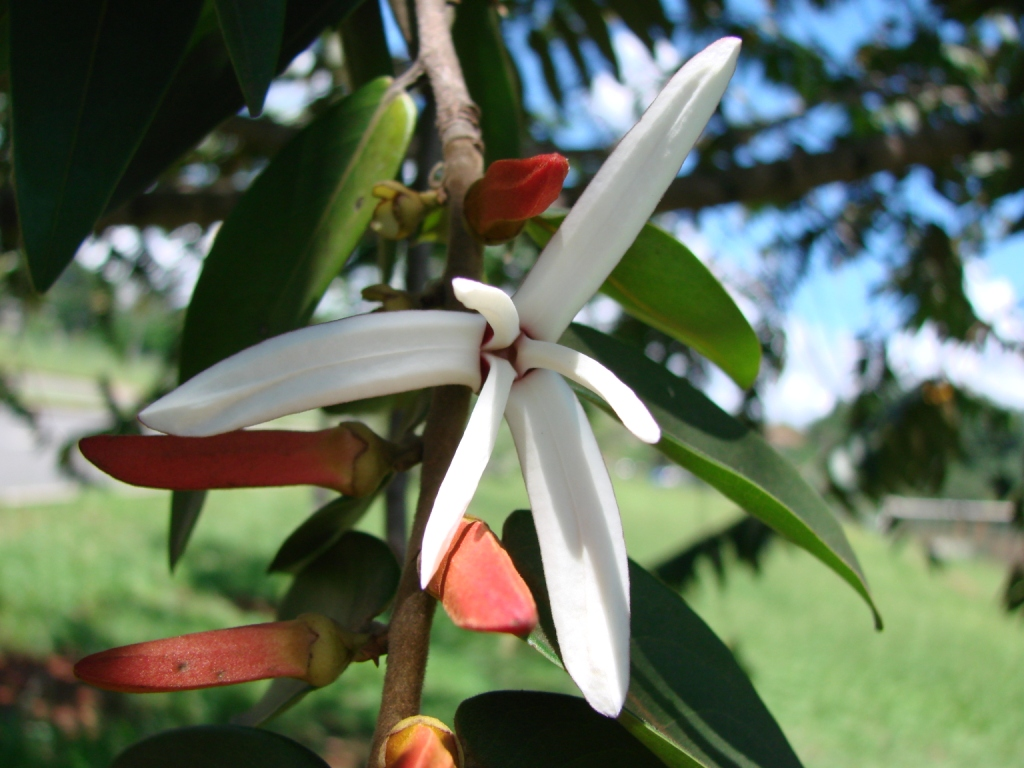

Conservation status
- Least Concern (IUCN 3.1)

Scientific classification
- Kingdom: Plantae
- Clade: Embryophytes
- Clade: Tracheophytes
- Clade: Spermatophytes
- Clade: Angiosperms
- Clade: Magnoliids
- Order: Magnoliales
- Family: Annonaceae
- Genus: Xylopia
- Species: X. aromatica

Binomial name
- Xylopia aromatica (Lam.) Mart.

Synonyms
- Synonymy: Habzelia aromatica (Lam.) A.DC.; Coelocline lucida (DC.) A.DC.; Habzelia cubensis A.DC. ex Steud.; Unona aromatica (Lam.) Dunal; Unona cubensis Steud.; Unona lucida DC.; Unona parviflora Steud., not validly publ.; Unona xylopioides Dunal; Uvaria aromatica Lam. (1785) (basionym); Xylopia cubensis (A.DC. ex Steud.) A.Rich.; Xylopia dunaliana Planch. & Linden; Xylopia grandiflora A.St.-Hil.; Xylopia longifolia A.DC., nom. superfl.; Xylopia lucida (DC.) Baill.; Xylopia xylopioides (Dunal) Standl.; Xylopicrum aromaticum (Lam.) Kuntze; Xylopicrum grandiflorum (A.St.-Hil.) Kuntze; Xylopicrum longifolium Kuntze, nom. superfl.

= Xylopia aromatica =

Species of tree

Xylopia aromatica is a species of flowering plant in the Annonaceae family. It is a tree native to the tropical Americas, ranging from Honduras to Paraguay and southern Brazil, including Cuba. It grows in the Cerrado grasslands, particularly in the states of Goiás and Minas Gerais, in eastern Brazil.
