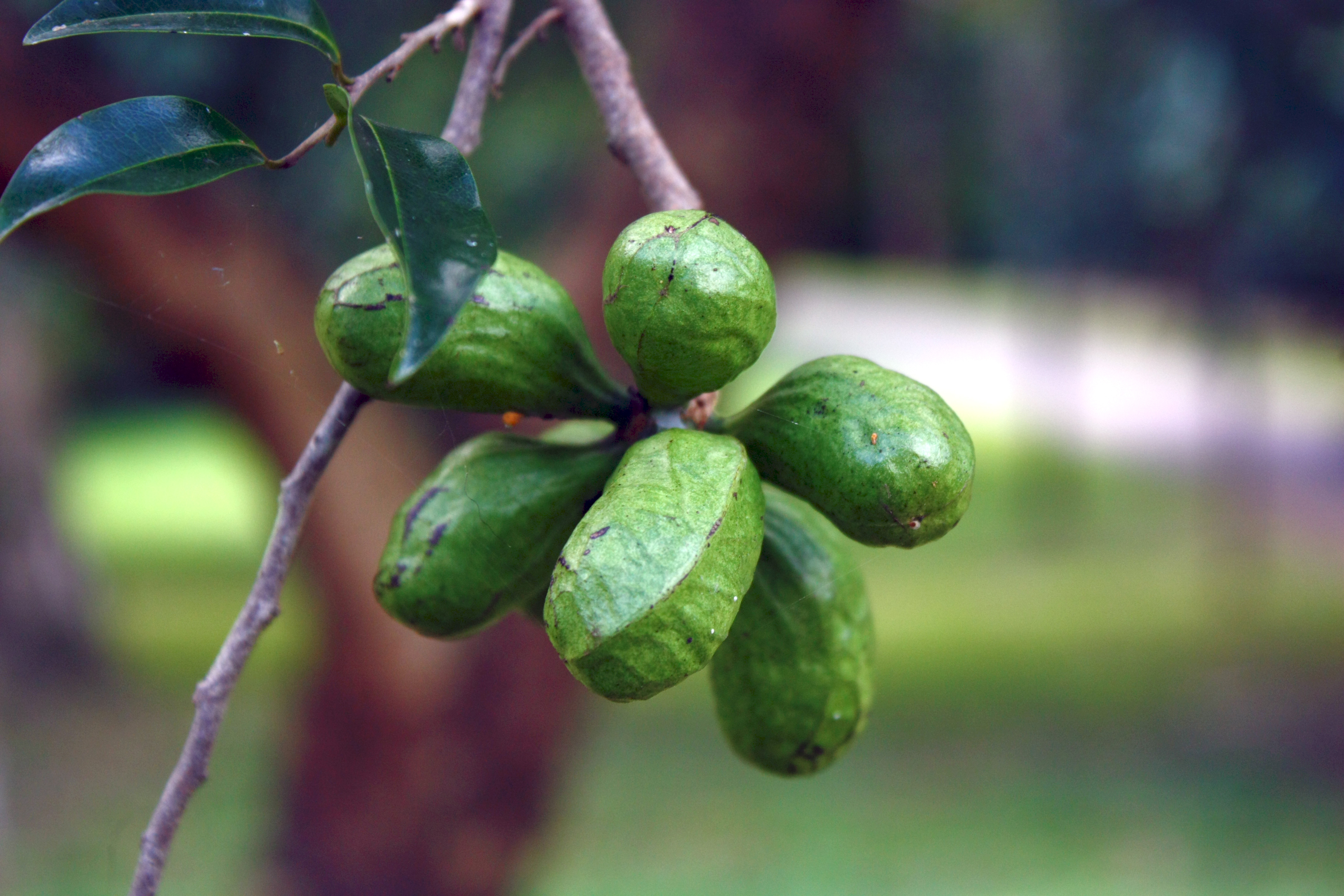
- Xylopia nigricans fruit in Peradeniya Botanical Gardens, Sri Lanka

Conservation status
- Near Threatened (IUCN 3.1)

Scientific classification
- Kingdom: Plantae
- Clade: Embryophytes
- Clade: Tracheophytes
- Clade: Spermatophytes
- Clade: Angiosperms
- Clade: Magnoliids
- Order: Magnoliales
- Family: Annonaceae
- Genus: Xylopia
- Species: X. nigricans

Binomial name
- Xylopia nigricans Hook.f. & Thompson

Synonyms
- Xylopicrum nigricans Kuntze

= Xylopia nigricans =

Species of flowering plant

Xylopia nigricans is a species of flowering plant in the Annonaceae family. It is a tree endemic to Sri Lanka. It is known as heen kenda (හීන් කෙන්ද) in Sinhala. It is native to lowland rain forest. It is widely used as a medicinal plant in Sri Lanka.
