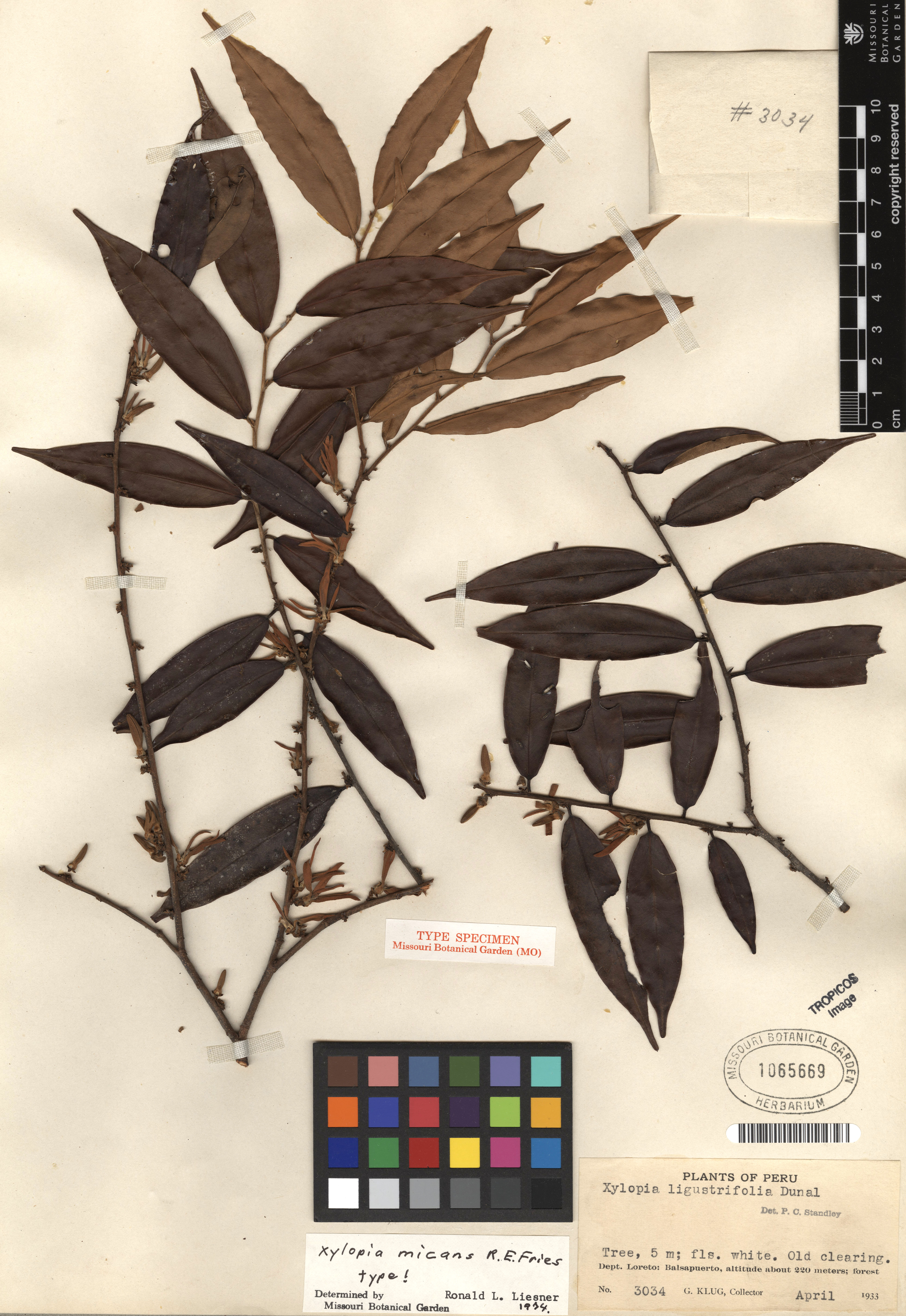
- Herbarium specimen of Xylopia micans

Conservation status
- Least Concern (IUCN 3.1)

Scientific classification
- Kingdom: Plantae
- Clade: Embryophytes
- Clade: Tracheophytes
- Clade: Spermatophytes
- Clade: Angiosperms
- Clade: Magnoliids
- Order: Magnoliales
- Family: Annonaceae
- Genus: Xylopia
- Species: X. micans

Binomial name
- Xylopia micans R.E.Fr.

= Xylopia micans =

Species of flowering plant

Xylopia micans is a species of plant in the Annonaceae family. It is native to Colombia, Ecuador and Peru. Robert Elias Fries, the botanist who first formally described the species, named it after the gleaming (micans in Latin) hairs on the undersides of its leaves.

== Description ==
It is a tree reaching 5 meters in height. The young, branches have dense, rust-colored, soft, silky hairs. The young branches have internodes about 1 centimeters long. Its lance-shaped, papery leaves are 6–9 by 1.3-2 centimeters. The upper surfaces of the leaves are hairless; the lower surfaces are densely covered in long, rusty-gold, silky, gleaming hairs that lay flat against surface. The base of the leaves come to a brief point with one side extending further than the other. The tips of the leaves are tapered and shallowly pointed. The midribs of the leaves are very impressed on the upper surfaces and prominently raised on the lower surface. Its petioles are 3-5 millimeters long, and covered in soft, silky hairs, with a narrow groove on their upper side. Its solitary flowers occur in axillary positions. The flowers are on pedicel that are 2-3 millimeters long and covered in gold-colored silky hairs. The petioles have bracts. Its flowers have 3 round to egg-shaped sepals that are 1.5 millimeters long. The lower surfaces of the sepals are covered in silky hairs. The sepals are almost free. Its 6 petals are arranged in two rows of 3. The yellow-orange, linear to strap-shaped, outer petals are 18 by 1.5-3.5 millimeters. The lower surfaces of the outer petals are covered in silky hairs that lay flat above the base; the upper surface has tufts of soft, white, woolly hairs. The inner petals are slightly shorter, broadened and concave at the base, and linear with three faces, about 1 millimeters wide, above the base. The flowers have stamens that are 0.8 millimeters long. The flowers have up to 6 carpels with densely hairy ovaries that are 1 millimeter long. The flowers have stigma that are 5 millimeters long with styles that are bent near their base.

=== Reproductive biology ===
The pollen of Xylopia micans is shed as permanent tetrads.

=== Distribution and habitat ===
It has been observed growing in forests and old clearings at elevations of 200 meters.
