= Monique Keraudren =

French botanist (1928–1981)

Monique Keraudren-Aymonin (8 December 1928– 25 May 1981) was a French botanist and botanical illustrator and photographer.

== Life and work ==
Keraudren-Aymonin was the third of six children born to Joseph Marie Keraudren and Rose Emilie Boëzennec. Her father was the director of a shipyard. She initially attended the community school in Cameret, but after her mother died in 1937, she then had to switch to boarding schools in Quimper and Brest. Keraudren was passionate about geography, science, music and art from an early age. On the advice of her uncle, a canon and mathematics professor, Keraudren-Aymonin began higher studies, attending the Catholic University of the West in Angers and then the science faculties of the University of Rennes and Paris-Sorbonne University. After eight certificates, she completed her university studies under the supervision of Pierre Pruvost. In 1955 she was commissioned by Henri Humbert, then chair of phanerogamy at the French National Museum of Natural History, to do a work on flower analysis and botanical illustrations. Humbert hired her as an assistant in his department that same year. After two research stays in Madagascar in 1960 and 1962, she received her doctorate in natural sciences from the École Normale Supérieure in 1966 with the dissertation Researches sur les Cucurbitacées de Madagascar. She later continued her work at the Chair of Phanerogamy and in 1971 was appointed deputy director of the National Museum of Natural History of France, in Paris.

She specialised in the study of the flora of Madagascar and of the Comoros, of the family of the Cucurbitaceae.

Keraudren-Aymonin's research focus was on the systematics, phytogeography, biology and ecology of the Malagasy flora. She specialized in the island's cucurbit family (Cucurbitaceae), but also worked with other plant families such as the Annonaceae family and the Begoniaceae family. Keraudren-Aymonin's bibliography includes over 100 publications, including Le Carporama de LMA de Robillard d'Argentelle (1979, with illustrator Jacqueline Saussotte-Guérel) on wax models of Mauritian fruits made by Louis Robillard d'Argentelle in the 19th century, Recherches sur les Cucurbitacées de Madagascar (1966), Types biologiques et types de succulence chez quelques végétaux des fourrés du sud-ouest de Madagascar (1966), Les Flores sèches de l'Ancien Monde (1966) and Cucurbitacées (1967). She also contributed significantly to the series Flore de Madagascar et des Comores: plantes vasculaires by Henri Humbert and Jean-François Leroy, where she published seven monographs.

She married the French botanist Gérard Guy Aymonin (1934–2014). The standard author abbreviation Keraudren is used to indicate this person as the author when citing a botanical name.

== Selected publications ==
- Keraudren-Aymonin, Monique (1978), Taxonomic aspects of African economic botany. Proc. IX plenary meeting of Association pour l'Etude Taxonomique de la Flore d'Afrique Tropicale, AETFAT, Las Palmas de Gran Canaria, 18–23 March 1978
- Keraudren-Aymonin, Monique (1970), Mitteilungen der Botanischen Staatssammlung München. 10 Proc. of the 7º plenary meeting of the Association pour l'Etude Taxonomique of the Flore of l'Afrique Tropicale, AETFAT, Munich, 7–12 September 1970
- Keraudren, Monique (1968). Recherches sur les cucurbitacées de Madagascar. Nouvelle série. Série B, Botanique 16 (2). Éditions du Muséum.
- Keraudren-Aymonin, Monique (1983). Bégoniacées. Vol. 144–145. Museum National d'Histoire Naturelle, Lab. de Phanérogamie. ISBN 978-2-85654-165-4.
- Keraudren, Monique (1967). Cucurbitacées. Muséum National d'Histoire Naturelle.

== Honours ==
Several plants were named after her:

- (Annonaceae) Polyalthia keraudreniae Le Thomas & G.E.Schatz
- (Asclepiadaceae) Stapelianthus keraudreniae Bosser & Morat
- (Begoniaceae) Begonia keraudreniae Bosser
- (Convolvulaceae) Ipomoea keraudreniae Deroin
- (Fabaceae) Vigna keraudrenii Du Puy & Labat
- (Loranthaceae) Socratina keraudreniana Balle

Also, a genus of plant from central Asia;

- (Apiaceae) Keraymonia Farille
