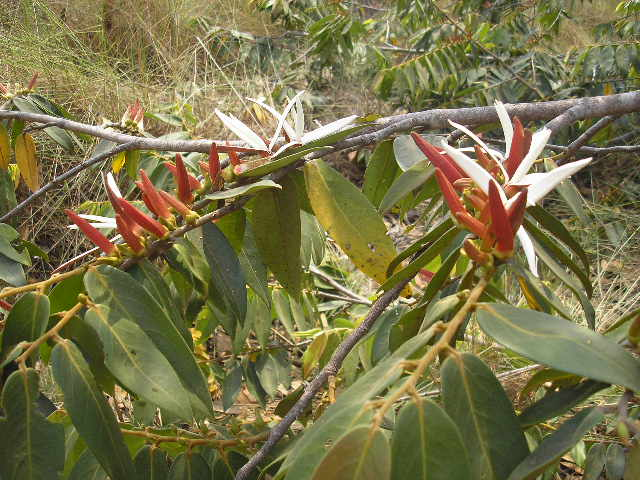
- Xylopia aromatica

Scientific classification
- Kingdom: Plantae
- Clade: Embryophytes
- Clade: Tracheophytes
- Clade: Angiosperms
- Clade: Magnoliids
- Order: Magnoliales
- Family: Annonaceae
- Subfamily: Annonoideae
- Tribe: Xylopieae
- Genus: Xylopia; L.

Synonyms
- Coelocline A.DC.; Habzelia A.DC.; Parartabotrys Miq.; Patonia Wight; Pseudannona Saff.; Unona L.f.; Waria Aubl.; Xylopicron Adans.; Xylopicrum P.Browne

= Xylopia =

Genus of flowering plants

Xylopia is a genus of flowering plants in the family Annonaceae. The genus primarily consists of trees, with some species also being shrubs. There are about 200 species distributed across Asia, Africa, and the Americas.

== Accepted species ==
As of May 2026, Plants of the World Online accepts the following 197 species:

- Xylopia acunae Borhidi & E.Del-Risco
- Xylopia acutiflora (Dunal) A.Rich.
- Xylopia aenea D.M.Johnson & N.A.Murray
- Xylopia aethiopica (Dunal) A.Rich.
- Xylopia africana (Benth.) Oliv.
- Xylopia amazonica R.E.Fr.
- Xylopia ambanjensis Cavaco & Keraudren
- Xylopia amoena R.E.Fr.
- Xylopia ampla D.M.Johnson & N.A.Murray
- Xylopia amplexicaulis (Lam.) Baill.
- Xylopia annoniflora Pombo & Zartman
- Xylopia anomala D.M.Johnson & N.A.Murray
- Xylopia arenaria Engl.
- Xylopia aromatica (Lam.) Mart.
- Xylopia atlantica Mello-Silva & J.C.Lopes
- Xylopia aurantiiodora De Wild. & T.Durand
- Xylopia australis D.M.Johnson & N.A.Murray
- Xylopia barbata Hoffm. ex Mart.
- Xylopia beananensis Cavaco & Keraudren
- Xylopia bemarivensis Diels
- Xylopia benthamii R.E.Fr.
- Xylopia bocatorena Schery
- Xylopia brasiliensis Spreng.
- Xylopia brunneola D.M.Johnson & N.A.Murray
- Xylopia bullata D.M.Johnson & N.A.Murray
- Xylopia buxifolia Baill.
- Xylopia calophylla R.E.Fr.
- Xylopia calosericea Diels
- Xylopia calva D.M.Johnson & N.A.Murray
- Xylopia capuronii Cavaco & Keraudren
- Xylopia carinata D.M.Johnson & N.A.Murray
- Xylopia caudata Hook.f. & Thomson
- Xylopia cayennensis Maas
- Xylopia championii Hook.f. & Thomson
- Xylopia chlorosperma D.M.Johnson & N.A.Murray
- Xylopia chocoensis R.E.Fr.
- Xylopia collina Diels
- Xylopia columbiana R.E.Fr.
- Xylopia congolensis De Wild.
- Xylopia conjungens R.E.Fr.
- Xylopia coriifolia Ridl.
- Xylopia cornuta D.M.Johnson & N.A.Murray
- Xylopia corrugata D.M.Johnson & N.A.Murray
- Xylopia crinita R.E.Fr.
- Xylopia cupularis Mildbr.
- Xylopia cuspidata Diels
- Xylopia danguyella Ghesq. ex Cavaco & Keraudren
- Xylopia decorticans D.M.Johnson & Lobão
- Xylopia degeneri A.C.Sm.
- Xylopia dehiscens (Blanco) Merr.
- Xylopia densiflora R.E.Fr.
- Xylopia densifolia Elmer
- Xylopia dibaccata Däniker
- Xylopia dielsii Cavaco & Keraudren
- Xylopia dinklagei Engl. & Diels
- Xylopia discreta (L.f.) Sprague & Hutch.
- Xylopia egleriana Aristeg. ex Maas
- Xylopia ekmanii R.E.Fr.
- Xylopia elliotii Pierre ex Engl. & Diels
- Xylopia elliptica Maingay ex Hook.f. & Thomson
- Xylopia emarginata Mart.
- Xylopia erythrodactyla D.M.Johnson & N.A.Murray
- Xylopia excellens R.E.Fr.
- Xylopia fananehanensis Cavaco & Keraudren
- Xylopia ferruginea (Hook.f. & Thomson) Baill.
- Xylopia flamignii Boutique
- Xylopia flexuosa Diels
- Xylopia frutescens Aubl.
- Xylopia fusca Maingay ex Hook.f. & Thomson
- Xylopia galokothamna D.M.Johnson & N.A.Murray
- Xylopia ghesquiereana Cavaco & Keraudren
- Xylopia gilbertii Boutique
- Xylopia globosa D.M.Johnson & N.A.Murray
- Xylopia glomerulosa Pontes-Pires
- Xylopia gracilipes D.M.Johnson & N.A.Murray
- Xylopia hastarum M.L.Green
- Xylopia heterotricha D.M.Johnson & N.A.Murray
- Xylopia holtzii Engl.
- Xylopia humbertii Ghesq. ex Cavaco & Keraudren
- Xylopia humblotiana Baill.
- Xylopia hypolampra Mildbr.
- Xylopia involucrata M.C.Dias & Kin.-Gouv.
- Xylopia jamaicensis Griseb.
- Xylopia kalabenonensis D.M.Johnson, Deroin & Callm.
- Xylopia katangensis De Wild.
- Xylopia keniensis D.M.Johnson
- Xylopia kuchingensis I.M.Turner & D.M.Johnson
- Xylopia laevigata (Mart.) R.E.Fr.
- Xylopia lamarckii Baill.
- Xylopia lamii Cavaco & Keraudren
- Xylopia lanceola Ridl.
- Xylopia lanceolata R.E.Fr.
- Xylopia langsdorfiana A.St.-Hil. & Tul.
- Xylopia lastelliana Baill.
- Xylopia lemurica Diels
- Xylopia letestui Pellegr.
- Xylopia ligustrifolia Dunal
- Xylopia lokobensis D.M.Johnson & N.A.Murray
- Xylopia longicaudata Maas & Westra
- Xylopia longicuspis R.E.Fr.
- Xylopia longipetala De Wild. & T.Durand
- Xylopia longirostra D.M.Johnson & N.A.Murray
- Xylopia lukei D.M.Johnson & Goyder
- Xylopia maasiana Pontes-Pires
- Xylopia maccreae (F.Muell.) L.S.Sm.
- Xylopia macrantha Triana & Planch.
- Xylopia madagascariensis Cavaco & Keraudren
- Xylopia magna Maingay ex Hook.f.
- Xylopia makiraensis D.M.Johnson & N.A.Murray
- Xylopia malayana Hook.f. & Thomson
- Xylopia marojejyana D.M.Johnson & N.A.Murray
- Xylopia micans R.E.Fr.
- Xylopia microcalyx D.M.Johnson & N.A.Murray
- Xylopia mildbraedii Diels
- Xylopia monosperma Jessup
- Xylopia monticola D.M.Johnson & N.A.Murray
- Xylopia mucronata Boerl.
- Xylopia multiflora R.E.Fr.
- Xylopia muricata L.
- Xylopia musella D.M.Johnson & N.A.Murray
- Xylopia mwasumbii D.M.Johnson
- Xylopia nervosa (R.E.Fr.) Maas
- Xylopia ngii D.M.Johnson & N.A.Murray
- Xylopia nigricans Hook.f. & Thomson
- Xylopia nilotica D.M.Johnson & N.A.Murray
- Xylopia nitida Dunal
- Xylopia niyomdhamii D.M.Johnson & N.A.Murray
- Xylopia obtusifolia (A.DC.) A.Rich.
- Xylopia ochrantha Mart.
- Xylopia odoratissima Welw. ex Oliv.
- Xylopia orestera I.M.Turner & D.M.Johnson
- Xylopia orinocensis Bagstad & D.M.Johnson
- Xylopia oxyantha (Hook.f. & Thomson) Hook.f. & Thomson
- Xylopia pachysericea D.M.Johnson & N.A.Murray
- Xylopia pacifica A.C.Sm.
- Xylopia pallescens Baill.
- Xylopia panamensis G.E.Schatz
- Xylopia pancheri Baill.
- Xylopia paniculata Exell
- Xylopia papuana Diels
- Xylopia parviflora Spruce
- Xylopia patoniae I.M.Turner
- Xylopia peekelii Diels
- Xylopia perrieri Diels
- Xylopia peruviana R.E.Fr.
- Xylopia phloiodora Mildbr.
- Xylopia pierrei Hance
- Xylopia piratae D.M.Johnson & N.A.Murray
- Xylopia pittieri Diels
- Xylopia platycarpa D.M.Johnson & N.A.Murray
- Xylopia platypetala R.E.Fr.
- Xylopia plowmanii P.E.Berry & D.M.Johnson
- Xylopia polyantha R.E.Fr.
- Xylopia pulchella Ridl.
- Xylopia pulcherrima Sandwith
- Xylopia pynaertii De Wild.
- Xylopia quintasii Pierre ex Engl. & Diels
- Xylopia ravelonarivoi D.M.Johnson & N.A.Murray
- Xylopia retusa D.M.Johnson & N.A.Murray
- Xylopia richardii Boivin ex Baill.
- Xylopia rigidiflora Bagstad & D.M.Johnson
- Xylopia rogstadii D.M.Johnson & N.A.Murray
- Xylopia roigii P.Wilson
- Xylopia rubescens Oliv.
- Xylopia rubrolineata Vaughn, Harper, Reiter et al
- Xylopia sahafariensis Cavaco & Keraudren
- Xylopia schroederi Sleumer ex Herter
- Xylopia sclerophylla D.M.Johnson & N.A.Murray
- Xylopia sericea A.St.-Hil.
- Xylopia sericolampra Diels
- Xylopia sericophylla Standl. & L.O.Williams
- Xylopia sessiliflora (Kochummen & Whitmore) D.M.Johnson & N.A.Murray
- Xylopia shirensis (Engl. & Diels) D.M.Johnson & N.A.Murray
- Xylopia spruceana Benth. ex Spruce
- Xylopia staudtii Engl. & Diels
- Xylopia subdehiscens (King) J.Sinclair
- Xylopia sulangwane D.M.Johnson & N.A.Murray
- Xylopia sumatrana (Miq.) D.M.Johnson & N.A.Murray
- Xylopia surinamensis R.E.Fr.
- Xylopia takeuchii D.M.Johnson & N.A.Murray
- Xylopia talbotii Exell
- Xylopia tanganyikensis D.M.Johnson
- Xylopia tenuipetala D.M.Johnson & Goyder
- Xylopia thomsonii Oliv.
- Xylopia tomentosa Exell
- Xylopia torrei N.Robson
- Xylopia toussaintii Boutique
- Xylopia trichostemon R.E.Fr.
- Xylopia unguiculata D.M.Johnson & N.A.Murray
- Xylopia uniflora R.E.Fr.
- Xylopia venezuelana R.E.Fr.
- Xylopia vieillardii Baill.
- Xylopia vielana Pierre
- Xylopia villosa Chipp
- Xylopia vitiensis A.C.Sm.
- Xylopia vulcanicola D.M.Johnson & N.A.Murray
- Xylopia wilwerthii De Wild. & T.Durand
- Xylopia xylantha R.E.Fr.
