= Annick Le Thomas =

French botanist (1936–2024)

Annick Le Thomas (née Hommay; 21 June 1936 – 18 September 2024) was a French botanist, best known for her work in the field of pollen analysis. She is a recognised expert on the Annonaceae family of flowering plants.

The standard author abbreviation Le Thomas is used to indicate this person as the author when citing a botanical name.
