= List of rectors of University of Rostock =

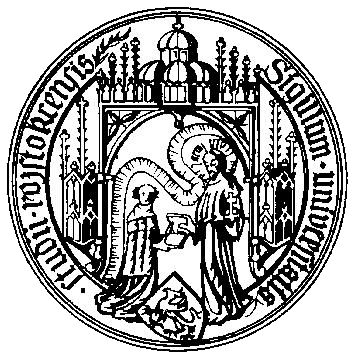
Seal of the University of Rostock

The list of rectors of University of Rostock lists all those who became the rector of the University of Rostock since its foundation in 1419.

== 15th century ==
=== 1419–1436 ===
No	Name	Year	Semester	Faculty	Note
1	Petrus Stenbeke	1419	Winter	Faculty of Philosophy	Master of Theology, from Schweriner Bischof und university chancellor Heinrich III. von Wangelin appointed Founding Rector.
2	Werner Brekewolt (I)	1420	Summer	Faculty of Law	born in Lübeck
3	Dietrich Zukow	1420	Winter	Faculty of Philosophy	born in Rostock
4	Johannes Voß (I)	1421	Summer	Faculty of Law	born in Soest, zuvor acht Jahre Protonotar in Lübeck
5	Hermann von Hamme (I)	1421	Winter	Faculty of Philosophy	Hamburger Domvikar
6	Ludolf Gruwel	1422	Summer	Faculty of Law	born in Lüneburg
7	Borchard Plotze (I)	1422	Winter	Faculty of Philosophy	born in Stralsund, later Lecturer at Hamburger Dom
8	Dietrich Zukow (II)	1423	Summer	Faculty of Philosophy	
9	Johannes Voß (II)	1423	Winter	Faculty of Law	
10	Heinrich Toke	1424	Summer	Faculty of Philosophy	born in Bremen
11	Dietrich Zukow (III)	1424	Winter	Faculty of Philosophy	
12	Hermann von Hamme (II)	1425	Summer	Faculty of Philosophy	
13	Johannes Voß (III)	1425	Winter	Faculty of Law	
14	Nicolaus Theoderici	1426	Summer	Faculty of Philosophy	born in Amsterdam
15	Tidemannus Johannis (I)	1426	Winter	Phil./Jur. Faculty ?	born in Amsterdam
16	Albert Schröter	1427	Summer	Faculty of Philosophy	born in Dortmund
17	Johannes Holt (I)	1427	Winter	Faculty of Philosophy	came from Erzbistum Bremen, Senior Lecturer at Hamburger Dom
18	Dietrich Zukow (IV)	1428	Summer	Faculty of Philosophy	
19	Johannes Voß (IV) Vice Rector Johannes Holt Vice Rector Dietrich Zukow	1428	Winter	Faculty of Law	
20	Johannes Holt (II)	1429	Summer	Faculty of Philosophy	
21	Arnoldus de Tricht	1429	Winter	Faculty of Philosophy	born in Utrecht. Mediziner.
22	Dietrich Zukow (V)	1430	Summer	Faculty of Philosophy	
23	Bernhard Bodeker (I)	1430	Winter	Faculty of Philosophy	born in Hagen
24	Ludolf Sartoris Ebkestorf (I)	1431	Summer	Faculty of Philosophy	born in Ebstorf
25	Johannes Voß de Monasterio (I)	1431	Winter	Faculty of Law	came from Münster/Westf.
26	Hinrich Bekelin (I)	1432	Summer	Faculty of Law	born in Rostock
27	Tidemannus Johannis (II)	1432	Winter	Faculty of Law	
28	Bernhard Bodeker (II)	1433	Summer	Faculty of Philosophy	
29	Hinrich Bekelin (II)	1433	Winter	Faculty of Law	
30	Ludolf Sartoris Ebkestorf (II)	1434	Summer	Faculty of Philosophy	
31	Bernhard Bodeker (III) Vice Rector Tidemannus Johannis	1434	Winter	Faculty of Philosophy	
32	Nikolaus Wendorp (I)	1435	Summer	Faculty of Law	
33	Hinrich Bekelin (III)	1435	Winter	Faculty of Law	
34	Helmold von Uelzen (I)	1436	Summer	Faculty of Philosophy	
35	Helmold von Uelzen (II)	1436	Winter	Faculty of Philosophy	

=== 1437–1443 ===
No	Name	Year	Semester	Faculty	Note
36	Nikolaus Wendorp (II) Vice Rector Wilkin Bole	1437	Summer	Faculty of Law	
37	Bernhard Bodeker (IV) Vice Rector Nicolaus Theoderici	1437	Winter	Faculty of Philosophy	
38	Hinrich Bekelin (IV)	1438	Summer	Faculty of Law	
39	Nikolaus Wendorp (III)	1438	Winter	Faculty of Law	
40	Bernhard Bodeker (V)	1439	Summer	Faculty of Philosophy	
41	Hinrich Bekelin (V)	1439	Winter	Faculty of Law	
-	Rector remains unoccupied	1440 bis 1443	-	-	Due to the interdict by the Council of Basel
42	Hinrich Bekelin (VI)	1443	Summer	Faculty of Law	
43	Arnold Westphal Vice Rector Hinrich Bekelin	1443	Winter	Faculty of Law	born in Lübeck, Bischof von Lübeck

=== 1444–1469 ===
No	Name	Year	Semester	Faculty	Note
44	Heinrich Nettelhorst Vice Rector Hinrich Bekelin Vice Rector Nikolaus Wendorp	1444	Summer	Faculty of Philosophy	born in Lübeck
45	Nikolaus Wendorp (IV)	1444	Winter	Faculty of Law	
46	Hinrich Bekelin (VII)	1445	Summer	Faculty of Law	
47	Nikolaus Wendorp (V)	1445	Winter		
48	Johannes Stammel (I)	1446	Summer	Faculty of Philosophy	born in Lübeck, Thomas Stammel's brother
49	Heinrich von dem Werder (I)	1446	Winter	Faculty of Philosophy	born in Parchim
50	Hinrich Bekelin (VIII)	1447	Summer	Faculty of Law	
51	Nikolaus Wendorp (VI)	1447	Winter	Faculty of Law	
52	Johannes Stammel (II)	1448	Summer	Faculty of Philosophy	
53	Johannes de Nova Domo	1448	Winter	Faculty of Philosophy	
54	Heinrich Schonenberg Vice Rector Hinrich Bekelin	1449	Summer	Faculty of Philosophy	born in Lübeck
55	Hinrich Bekelin (IX)	1449	Winter	Faculty of Law	
56	Nikolaus Wendorp (VII)	1450	Summer	Faculty of Law	
57	Heinrich von dem Werder (II)	1450	Winter	Faculty of Philosophy	
58	Johannes Stammel (III)	1451	Summer	Faculty of Philosophy	
59	Borchard Plotze (II) Vice Rector Hinrich Bekelin	1451	Winter	Theol./Phil. Faculty	
60	Hinrich Bekelin (X)	1452	Summer	Faculty of Law	
61	Nikolaus Wendorp (VIII)	1452	Winter	Faculty of Law	
62	Hinrich Bekelin (XI)	1453	Summer	Faculty of Law	
63	Lambert Witinghof (I) Vice Rector Hinrich Bekelin	1453	Winter	Faculty of Law	born in Lübeck
64	Johannes Stammel (IV)	1454	Summer	Faculty of Philosophy	
65	Hinrich Bekelin (XII)	1454	Winter	Faculty of Law	
66	Heinrich von dem Werder (III)	1455	Summer	Faculty of Philosophy	
67	Nikolaus Wendorp (IX)	1455	Winter	Faculty of Law	
68	Johannes Stammel (V)	1456	Summer	Faculty of Philosophy	
69	Lambert Witinghof (II)	1456	Winter	Faculty of Law	
70	Heinrich Schone (I)	1457	Summer	Faculty of Theology	
71	Nikolaus Garden	1457	Winter	Faculty of Law	born in Greifenhagen
72	Johannes Stammel (VI)	1458	Summer	Faculty of Philosophy	
73	Lambert Witinghof (III)	1458	Winter	Faculty of Law	
74	Nikolaus Wendorp (X)	1459	Summer	Faculty of Law	
75	Heinrich von dem Werder (IV)	1459	Winter	Faculty of Philosophy	
76	Johannes Stammel (VII)	1460	Summer	Faculty of Philosophy	
77	Lambert Witinghof (IV)	1460	Winter	Faculty of Law	
78	Nikolaus Wendorp (XI)	1461	Summer	Faculty of Law	
79	Johannes Stammel (VIII)	1461	Winter	Faculty of Philosophy	
80	Lambert Witinghof (V)	1462	Summer	Faculty of Law	born in Lübeck
81	Thomas Stammel (I)	1462	Winter	Faculty of Philosophy	born in Lübeck
82	Heinrich von dem Werder (V)	1463	Summer	Faculty of Philosophy	
83	Johannes Stammel (IX)	1463	Winter	Faculty of Philosophy	
84	Lambert Witinghof (VI)	1464	Summer	Faculty of Law	
85	Heinrich Schone (II)	1464	Winter	Faculty of Theology	
86	Johannes Stammel (X)	1465	Summer	Faculty of Philosophy	
87	Lambert Witinghof (VII)	1465	Winter	Faculty of Law	
88	Albert Goyer (I) Vice Rector Johannes Stammel	1466	Summer	Faculty of Philosophy	born in Hasselt
89	Thomas Stammel (II)	1466	Winter	Faculty of Philosophy	
90	Heinrich Schone (III)	1467	Summer	Faculty of Theology	
91	Balthasar, Duke of Mecklenburg (I)	1467	Winter	Scholar	
92	Johannes Hahne (I)	1468	Summer	Faculty of Philosophy	born in Lübeck
93	Lambert Witinghof von Lübeck (VIII)	1468	Winter	Faculty of Law	
94	Johannes Bremermann von Minden (I)	1469	Summer	Faculty of Philosophy	born in Minden
95	Konrad Schetzel (I)	1469	Winter	Faculty of Philosophy	

=== 1470–1499 ===
No	Name	Year	Semester	Faculty	Note
96	Petrus Bentz (I) Vice Rector Lambert Witinghof	1470	Summer	Faculty of Law	born in Brandenburg
97	Balthasar, Duke of Mecklenburg (II)	1470	Winter	Scholar	
98	Albert Goyer (II) Vice Rector Lambert Witinghof	1471	Summer	Faculty of Philosophy	
99	Heinrich Schone (IV)	1471	Winter	Faculty of Theology	
100	Lambert Witinghof (IX) Vice Rector Heinrich Schone	1472	Summer	Faculty of Law	
101	Johannes Hahne (II)	1472	Winter	Faculty of Philosophy	
102	Balthasar, Duke of Mecklenburg (III)	1473	Summer	Scholar	
103	Heinrich Schone (V)	1473	Winter	Faculty of Theology	
104	Petrus Bentz (II) Vice Rector Heinrich Oldstad Vice Rector Heinrich Schone	1474	Summer	Faculty of Law	
105	Johannes Bremermann (II)	1474	Winter	Faculty of Philosophy	
106	Konrad Schetzel (II)	1475	Summer	Faculty of Philosophy	
107	Johannes Lessmann (I)	1475	Winter	Faculty of Philosophy	
108	Heinrich Schone (VI)	1476	Summer	Faculty of Theology	
109	Otto Ernst	1476	Winter	Faculty of Law	born in Einbeck
110	Johannes Bremermann (III)	1477	Summer	Faculty of Philosophy	
111	Nikolaus Kruse	1477	Winter	Faculty of Law	born in Stolp
112	Liborius Meyer (I)	1478	Summer	Faculty of Law	born in Lübeck.
113	Heinrich Valke (I)	1478	Winter	Faculty of Philosophy	born in Emden
114	Konrad Schetzel (III)	1479	Summer	Faculty of Philosophy	
115	Heinrich Schone (VII)	1479	Winter	Faculty of Theology	
116	Johannes Lessmann (II) Vice Rector Heinrich Valke	1480	Summer	Faculty of Philosophy	
117	Lubertus Sedeler (I)	1480	Winter	Faculty of Law	born in Münster
118	Heinrich Morin (I)	1481	Summer	Faculty of Law	
119	Heinrich Schone (VIII)	1481	Winter	Faculty of Theology	
120	Johannes Milke	1482	Summer	Faculty of Law	born in Sternberg
121	Albert Krantz	1482	Winter	Faculty of Philosophy	born in Hamburg
122	Lubertus Sedeler (II)	1483	Summer	Faculty of Law	
123	Heinrich Morin (II)	1483	Winter	Faculty of Law	
124	Balthasar Jendrick (I)	1484	Summer	Faculty of Philosophy	born in Rostock
125	Heinrich Valke (II)	1484	Winter	Faculty of Philosophy	
126	Heinrich Schone (IX)	1485	Summer	Faculty of Theology	
127	Heinrich Schone (X)	1485	Winter	Faculty of Theology	
128	Liborius Meyer (II) Vice Rector Arnold Segeberg	1486	Summer	Faculty of Law	
129	Arnold Segeberg (I) Vice Rector Liborius Meyer	1486	Winter	Faculty of Law	born in Greifswald
130	Arnold Bodensen (I)	1487	Summer	Faculty of Philosophy	born in Völkersen
131	Arnold Bodensen (II)	1487	Winter	Faculty of Philosophy	
132	Arnold Bodensen (III) Vice Rector Balthasar Jenderick	1488	Summer	Faculty of Philosophy	
133	Lambert Vriling Vice Rector Arnold Segeberg	1488	Winter	Faculty of Philosophy	
134	Johannes Bergmann (I)	1489	Summer	Faculty of Philosophy	born in Rostock
135	Balthasar Jendrick (II) Vice Rector Arnold Segeberg	1489	Winter	Faculty of Philosophy	
136	Johannes Bergmann (II)	1490	Summer	Faculty of Philosophy	
137	Arnold Bodensen (IV)	1490	Winter	Faculty of Philosophy	
138	Arnold Segeberg (II) Vice Rector Balthasar Jenderick	1491	Summer	Faculty of Law	
139	Johann Eberbach Vice Rector Balthasar Jenderick	1491	Winter	Faculty of Philosophy	
140	Jakob Horstmann Vice Rector Johannes Bergmann Vice Rector Balthasar Jenderick	1492	Summer	Faculty of Theology	
141	Balthasar Jendrick (III)	1492	Winter	Faculty of Philosophy	
142	Liborius Meyer (III) Vice Rector Balthasar Jenderick Vice Rector Arnold Segeberg	1493	Summer	Faculty of Law	
143	Arnold Segeberg (III) Vice Rector Joachim Papke	1493	Winter	Faculty of Law	born in Greifswald born in Anklam
144	Johann Kröger	1494	Summer	Faculty of Philosophy	born in Hamburg
145	Joachim Papke (I)	1494	Winter	Faculty of Philosophy	born in Anklam
146	Johannes Bergmann (III)	1495	Summer	Faculty of Philosophy	
147	Gerhard Vrilde (I)	1495	Winter	Faculty of Theology	born in Lübeck
148	Arnold Bodensen (V)	1496	Summer	Faculty of Philosophy	
149	Henning Schowert (I)	1496	Winter	Faculty of Philosophy	born in Lund
150	Balthasar Jendrick (IV)	1497	Summer	Faculty of Philosophy	
151	Liborius Meyer (IV)	1497	Winter	Faculty of Law	
152	Gerhard Vrilde (II)	1498	Summer	Faculty of Theology	
153	Johannes Bergmann (IV)	1498	Winter	Faculty of Philosophy	
154	Erich, Duke of Mecklenburg (I) Vice Rector Arnold Bodensen	1499	Summer	Scholar	
155	Erich, Duke of Mecklenburg (II) Vice Rector Balthasar Jenderick	1499	Winter	Scholar	

== 16th century ==
=== 1500–1519 ===
No	Name	Year	Semester	Faculty	Note
156	Albert Winkel	1500	Summer	Faculty of Philosophy	born in Amsterdam
157	Joachim Papke (II)	1500	Winter	Faculty of Philosophy	
158	Andreas Becker	1501	Summer	Faculty of Philosophy ?	born in Magdeburg
159	Martin Glöden (I)	1501	Winter	Faculty of Law	born in Ruppin
160	Erich, Duke of Mecklenburg (III)	1502	Summer	Scholar	
161	Arnold Bodensen (VI)	1502	Winter	Faculty of Philosophy	
162	Gerhard Vrilde (III)	1503	Summer	Faculty of Theology	
163	Henning Schowert (II)	1503	Winter	Faculty of Philosophy	
164	Balthasar Jendrick (V)	1504	Summer	Faculty of Philosophy	
165	Nikolaus Löwe (I)	1504	Winter	Faculty of Law	born in Stettin
166	Johannes Bergmann (V)	1505	Summer	Faculty of Philosophy	
167	Barthold Moller (I)	1505	Winter	Faculty of Philosophy	born in Hamburg
168	Jasper Hoyer	1506	Summer	Faculty of Law	born in Lübeck
169	Johannes Bergmann (VI)	1506	Winter	Faculty of Philosophy	
170	Gerhard Vrilde (IV) Vice Rector Barthold Moller	1507	Summer	Faculty of Theology	
171	Nikolaus Löwe (II)	1507	Winter	Faculty of Law	
172	Gerhard Vrilde (V) Vice Rector Balthasar Jenderick	1508	Summer	Faculty of Theology	
173	Peter Boye (I)	1508	Winter	Faculty of Law	born in Nortorf
174	Wolfgang Graf von Eberstein-Naugard	1509	Summer	Scholar	
175	Jeberus Grothe (I)	1509	Winter	Faculty of Law	born in Dithmarschen
176	Nikolaus Löwe (III)	1510	Summer	Faculty of Law	
177	Heinrich Kruselmann	1510	Winter	Faculty of Philosophy	born in Lüneburg
178	Johannes Bergmann (VII)	1511	Summer	Faculty of Philosophy	
179	Barthold Moller (II)	1511	Winter	Faculty of Philosophy	
180	Gerhard Vrilde (VI) Vice Rector Barthold Moller	1512	Summer	Faculty of Theology	
181	Barthold Moller (III)	1512	Winter	Faculty of Philosophy	
182	Lucas Ronnebeke (I)	1513	Summer	Faculty of Law	born in Ruppin
183	Jeberus Grothe (II)	1513	Winter	Faculty of Law	
184	Johannes Bergmann (VIII)	1514	Summer	Faculty of Philosophy	
185	Peter Boye (II)	1514	Winter	Faculty of Law	
186	Rempert Gilsheim	1515	Summer	Faculty of Philosophy	born in Braunschweig
187	Nikolaus Löwe (IV)	1515	Winter	Faculty of Law	
188	Eberhard Dyckmann (I)	1516	Summer	Faculty of Philosophy	born in Rostock
189	Barthold Moller (IV)	1516	Winter	Faculty of Philosophy	
190	Lucas Ronnebeke (II)	1517	Summer	Faculty of Law	
191	Egbert Johannis (I)	1517	Winter	Faculty of Philosophy	born in Harlem
192	Joachim Wolterstorp (I)	1518	Summer	Faculty of Law	born in Rostock
193	Lucas Ronnebeke (III)	1518	Winter	Faculty of Law	
194	Barthold Moller (V)	1519	Summer	Faculty of Philosophy	
195	Barthold Moller (VI)	1519	Winter	Faculty of Philosophy	

=== 1520–1539 ===
No	Name	Year	Semester	Faculty	Note
196	Jodocus Stagge (I)	1520	Summer	Faculty of Philosophy	born in Stadthagen
197	Peter Boye (III)	1520	Winter	Faculty of Law	
198	Joachim Wolterstorp (II)	1521	Summer	Faculty of Law	
199	Egbert Johannis (II)	1521	Winter	Faculty of Philosophy	
200	Eberhard Dyckmann (II)	1522	Summer	Faculty of Philosophy	
201	Peter Boye (IV)	1522	Winter	Faculty of Law	
202	Nikolaus Löwe (V)	1523	Summer	Faculty of Law	
203	Dietrich Huls (IV)	1523	Winter	Scholar	Titularbischof von Sebaste
204	Egbert Johannis (III)	1524	Summer	Faculty of Philosophy	
205	Lucas Ronnebeke (IV)	1524	Winter	Faculty of Law	
206	Nikolaus Löwe (VI)	1525	Summer	Faculty of Law	
207	Johann Kruse	1525	Winter	Faculty of Philosophy	born in Bremen
208	Eberhard Dyckmann (III)	1526	Summer	Faculty of Philosophy	
209	Jodocus Stagge (II)	1526	Winter	Faculty of Philosophy	
210	Lucas Ronnebeke (V)	1527	Summer	Faculty of Law	
211	Lucas Ronnebeke (VI)	1527	Winter	Faculty of Law	
212	Egbert Johannis (IV)	1528	Summer	Faculty of Philosophy	
213	Barthold Moller (VII)	1528	Winter	Faculty of Philosophy	
214	Barthold Moller (VIII)	1529	Summer	Faculty of Philosophy	born in 1470 in Hamburg
215	Barthold Moller (IX)	1529	Winter	Faculty of Philosophy	gest. 1530 in Rostock
216	Nikolaus Löwe (VII)	1530	Summer	Faculty of Law	
217	Nikolaus Löwe (VIII)	1530	Winter	Faculty of Law	
218	Nikolaus Löwe (IX)	1531	Summer	Faculty of Law	
219	Nikolaus Löwe (X)	1531	Winter	Faculty of Law	
220	Nikolaus Löwe (XI)	1532	Summer	Faculty of Law	
221	Nikolaus Löwe (XII)	1532	Winter	Faculty of Law	
222	Nikolaus Löwe (XIII)	1533	Summer	Faculty of Law	
223	Nikolaus Löwe (XIV)	1533	Winter	Faculty of Law	
224	Nikolaus Löwe (XV)	1534	Summer	Faculty of Law	
225	Nikolaus Löwe (XVI)	1534	Winter	Faculty of Law	
226	Nikolaus Löwe (XVII)	1535	Summer	Faculty of Law	
227	Nikolaus Löwe (XVIII)	1535	Winter	Faculty of Law	
228	Peter Boye (V)	1536	Summer	Faculty of Law	
229	Peter Boye (VI)	1536	Winter	Faculty of Law	
230	Egbert Johannis (V)	1537	Summer	Faculty of Philosophy	
231	Egbert Johannis (VI)	1537	Winter	Faculty of Philosophy	
232	Konrad Pegel (I)	1538	Summer	Faculty of Philosophy	born in Wismar
233	Konrad Pegel (II)	1538	Winter	Faculty of Philosophy	
234	Andreas Eggerdes (I)	1539	Summer	Faculty of Philosophy	born in Rostock
235	Andreas Eggerdes (II)	1539	Winter	Faculty of Philosophy	

=== 1540–1559 ===
No	Name	Year	Semester	Faculty	Note
236	Lambert Takel (I)	1540	Summer	Faculty of Philosophy	born in Lüneburg
237	Lambert Takel (II)	1540	Winter	Faculty of Philosophy	born in Lüneburg
238	Peter Boye (VII)	1541	Summer	Faculty of Law	born in Nortorf
239	Peter Boye (VIII)	1541	Winter	Faculty of Law	born in Nortorf
240	Andreas Eggerdes (III)	1542	Summer	Faculty of Philosophy	born in Rostock
241	Andreas Eggerdes (IV)	1542	Winter	Faculty of Philosophy	born in Rostock
242	Andreas Eggerdes (V)	1543	Summer	Faculty of Philosophy	born in Rostock
243	Johannes Bronkhorst (I)	1543	Winter	Faculty of Philosophy	born in Nimwegen
244	Johannes Bronkhorst (II)	1544	Summer	Faculty of Philosophy	born in Nimwegen
245	Johann Strube (I)	1544	Winter	Faculty of Philosophy	born in Deventer
246	Johann Strube (II)	1545	Summer	Faculty of Philosophy	born in Deventer
247	Petrus Stratageus (Capitaneus) (I) Vice Rector Andreas Eggerdes	1545	Winter	Faculty of Philosophy	born in Middelburg
248	Petrus Stratageus (Capitaneus) (II) Vice Rector Andreas Eggerdes	1546	Summer	Faculty of Philosophy	born in Middelburg
249	Konrad Pegel (III)	1546	Winter	Faculty of Philosophy	born in Wismar
250	Konrad Pegel (IV)	1547	Summer	Faculty of Philosophy	born in Wismar
251	Adam Tratziger (I)	1547	Winter	Faculty of Law	born in Nürnberg
252	Adam Tratziger (II)	1548	Summer	Faculty of Law	born in Nürnberg
253	Andreas Eggerdes (VI)	1548	Winter	Faculty of Philosophy	born in Rostock
254	Andreas Eggerdes (VII)	1549	Summer	Faculty of Philosophy	born in Rostock
255	Andreas Eggerdes (VIII)	1549	Winter	Faculty of Philosophy	born in Rostock
256	Konrad Pegel (V)	1550	Summer	Faculty of Philosophy	born in Wismar
257	Konrad Pegel (VI)	1550	Winter	Faculty of Philosophy	born in Wismar
258	Konrad Pegel (VII)	1551	Summer	Faculty of Philosophy	born in Wismar
259	Konrad Pegel (VIII)	1551	Winter	Faculty of Philosophy	born in Wismar
260	Anton Freudemann (I)	1552	Summer	Faculty of Law	born in Halle
261	Anton Freudemann (II) Vice Rector Johann Draconites	1552	Winter	Faculty of Law	born in Halle
262	Johann Draconites (I)	1553	Summer	Faculty of Theology	born in Karlstadt
263	Johann Draconites (II)	1553	Winter	Faculty of Theology	born in Karlstadt
264	Matthäus Röseler (I)	1554	Summer	Faculty of Philosophy	born in Luckau
265	Matthäus Röseler (II) Vice Rector Andreas Martini	1554	Winter	Faculty of Philosophy	born in Luckau
266	Bernhard Mensing (I) Vice Rector Matthäus Röseler	1555	Summer	Faculty of Philosophy	born in Lübeck
267	Andreas Martini (I)	1555	Winter	Faculty of Philosophy	born in Rostock
268	Konrad Pegel (IX)	1556	Summer	Faculty of Philosophy	born in Wismar
269	Johann Draconites (III)	1556	Winter	Faculty of Theology	born in Karlstadt
270	Matthäus Röseler (III) Vice Rector Bernhard Mensing	1557	Summer	Faculty of Philosophy	born in Luckau
271	Matthäus Röseler (IV) Vice Rector Bernhard Mensing	1557	Winter	Faculty of Philosophy	born in Luckau
272	Wilhelm Novesian	1558	Summer	Faculty of Philosophy	born in Neuß
273	Bernhard Mensing (II)	1558	Winter	Faculty of Philosophy	born in Lübeck
274	Bernhard Mensing (III)	1559	Summer	Faculty of Philosophy	born in Lübeck
275	Andreas Martini (II)	1559	Winter	Faculty of Philosophy	born in Rostock

=== 1560–1579 ===
No	Name	Year	Semester	Faculty	Note
276	Andreas Martini (III)	1560	Summer	Faculty of Philosophy	born in Rostock
277	Matthäus Röseler (V) Vice Rector Bernhard Mensing	1560	Winter	Faculty of Philosophy	born in Luckau
278	Matthäus Röseler (VI) Vice Rector Bernhard Mensing	1561	Summer	Faculty of Philosophy	born in Luckau
279	Laurentius Kirchhoff (I)	1561	Winter	Faculty of Law	born in Rostock
280	Laurentius Kirchhoff (II)	1562	Summer	Faculty of Law	born in Rostock
281	Laurentius Kirchhoff (III)	1562	Winter	Faculty of Law	born in Rostock
282	David Chytraeus (I)	1563	Summer	Faculty of Theology	born in Ingelfingen
283	Lucas Bacmeister der Ältere (I)	1563	Winter	Faculty of Theology	born in Lüneburg
284	Johannes Boukius	1564	Summer	Faculty of Law	born in Hamburg
285	Matthäus Röseler (VII)	1564	Winter	Faculty of Philosophy	born in Luckau
286	Gerhard Nennius	1565	Summer	Faculty of Philosophy	born in Schleiden
287	Konrad Pegel (X)	1565	Winter	Faculty of Philosophy	born in Wismar
288	Simon Pauli der Ältere (I)	1566	Summer	Faculty of Theology	born in Schwerin
289	Johannes Posselius (der Ältere) (I)	1566	Winter	Faculty of Philosophy	born in Parchim
290	David Chytraeus (II)	1567	Summer	Faculty of Theology	born in Ingelfingen
291	Lucas Bacmeister der Ältere (II)	1567	Winter	Faculty of Theology	born in Lüneburg
292	Friedrich Hein (I)	1568	Summer	Faculty of Law	born in Neubrandenburg
293	Johannes Borcholt (I)	1568	Winter	Faculty of Law	born in Lüneburg
294	Heinrich Brucaeus von Aalst(I)	1569	Summer	Faculty of Medicine	born in Aalst
295	Johannes Posselius (der Ältere) (II)	1569	Winter	Faculty of Philosophy	born in Parchim
296	Simon Pauli der Ältere (II)	1570	Summer	Faculty of Theology	born in Schwerin
297	Valentin Schacht (I)	1570	Winter	Faculty of Theology	born in Stargard
298	Lorenz Niebur (I)	1571	Summer	Faculty of Law	born in Hamburg
299	Marcus Lüschow (I)	1571	Winter	Faculty of Law	born in Rostock
300	Bartholomäus Klinge (I)	1572	Summer	Faculty of Philosophy	born in Koblenz
301	Petrus Memmius (I)	1572	Winter	Faculty of Medicine	born in Herenthal
302	David Chytraeus (III)	1573	Summer	Faculty of Theology	born in Ingelfingen
303	Lucas Bacmeister der Ältere (III)	1573	Winter	Faculty of Theology	born in Lüneburg
304	Friedrich Hein (II)	1574	Summer	Faculty of Law	born in Neubrandenburg
305	Johannes Borcholt (II)	1574	Winter	Faculty of Law	born in Lüneburg
306	Heinrich Brucaeus (II)	1575	Summer	Faculty of Medicine	born in Aalst
307	Wilhelm Herzog von Braunschweig-Lüneburg Vice Rector Heinrich Varenius von Rostock	1575	Winter	Scholar	Duke of Brunswick and Lüneburg
308	Johann Gustav Graf von Rosen-Bosund Vice Rector Simon Pauli der Ältere	1576	Summer	Scholar	
309	Hans Cyriak Freiherr von Polheim und Wartenburg Vice Rector Valentin Schacht	1576	Winter	Scholar	
310	Lorenz Niebur (II)	1577	Summer	Faculty of Law	born in Hamburg
311	Marcus Lüschow (II)	1577	Winter	Faculty of Law	born in Rostock
312	Nathan Chyträus	1578	Summer	Faculty of Philosophy	born in Menzingen
313	Petrus Memmius (II)	1578	Winter	Faculty of Medicine	born in Herenthal
314	Bartholomäus Klinge (II)	1579	Summer	Faculty of Philosophy	born in Koblenz
315	Lucas Bacmeister der Ältere (IV) Vice Rector Johannes Posselius (der Ältere)	1579	Winter	Faculty of Theology	born in Lüneburg

=== 1580–1599 ===
No	Name	Year	Semester	Faculty	Note
316	Laurentius Kirchhoff (IV)	1580	Summer	Faculty of Law	born in Rostock
317	Marcus Lüschow (III)	1580	Winter	Faculty of Law	born in Rostock
318	Heinrich Brucaeus von Aalst (III)	1581	Summer	Faculty of Medicine	born in Aalst
319	Jakob Praetorius	1581	Winter	Faculty of Philosophy	born in Stettin
320	Simon Pauli der Ältere (III)	1582	Summer	Faculty of Theology	born in Schwerin
321	Valentin Schacht (II)	1582	Winter	Faculty of Theology	born in Stargard
322	Johannes Albinus (I)	1583	Summer	Faculty of Law	born in Parchim
323	Heinrich Camerarius (I)	1583	Winter	Faculty of Law	born in Braunschweig
324	Johannes Freder der Jüngere (I)	1584	Summer	Faculty of Philosophy	born in Hamburg
325	Wilhelm Lauremberg (I)	1584	Winter	Faculty of Medicine	born in Solingen
326	David Chytraeus (IV)	1585	Summer	Faculty of Theology	born in Ingelfingen
327	Lucas Bacmeister der Ältere (V)	1585	Winter	Faculty of Theology	born in Lüneburg
328	Michael Grass der Ältere	1586	Summer	Faculty of Law	born in Treptow
329	Marcus Lüschow (IV)	1586	Winter	Faculty of Law	born in Rostock
330	Heinrich Brucaeus von Aalst (IV)	1587	Summer	Faculty of Medicine	born in Aalst
331	Erasmus Stockmann	1587	Winter	Faculty of Philosophy	born in Hamburg
332	Simon Pauli der Ältere (IV)	1588	Summer	Faculty of Theology	born in Schwerin
333	Valentin Schacht (III)	1588	Winter	Faculty of Theology	born in Stargard
334	Johannes Albinus (II)	1589	Summer	Faculty of Law	born in Parchim
335	Heinrich Camerarius (II)	1589	Winter	Faculty of Law	born in Braunschweig
336	Bartholomäus Klinge (III)	1590	Summer	Faculty of Philosophy	born in Koblenz
337	Wilhelm Lauremberg (II)	1590	Winter	Faculty of Medicine	born in Solingen
338	Wilhelm (Kurland) (I) Vice-Rector David Chytraeus	1591	Summer	Scholar	Duke of Kurland
339	Wilhelm (Kurland) (II) Vice-Rector Lucas Bacmeister der Ältere	1591	Winter	Scholar	Duke of Kurland
340	Wilhelm (Kurland) (III) Vice-Rector Michael Grass der Ältere	1592	Summer	Scholar	Duke of Kurland
341	Ulrich von Schleswig-Holstein Vice-Rector Marcus Lüschow	1592	Winter	Scholar	Prince of Denmark
342	Bartholomäus Klinge (IV)	1593	Summer	Faculty of Philosophy	born in Koblenz
343	Magnus Pegel	1593	Winter	Faculty of Philosophy	born in Rostock
344	August Herzog von Braunschweig und Lüneburg Vice Rector Johannes Freder der Jüngere	1594	Summer	Scholar	
345	Valentin Schacht (IV)	1594	Winter	Faculty of Theology	born in Stargard
346	Johannes Albinus (III)	1595	Summer	Faculty of Law	born in Parchim
347	Heinrich Camerarius (III)	1595	Winter	Faculty of Law	born in Braunschweig
348	Marcus Hasse (I)	1596	Summer	Faculty of Philosophy	born in Havelberg
349	Heinrich Pauli	1596	Winter	Faculty of Medicine	born in Rostock
350	David Chytraeus (V)	1597	Summer	Faculty of Theology	born in Ingelfingen
351	Lucas Bacmeister der Ältere (VI)	1597	Winter	Faculty of Theology	born in Lüneburg
352	Johannes Albinus (IV)	1598	Summer	Faculty of Law	born in Parchim
353	Marcus Lüschow (V)	1598	Winter	Faculty of Law	born in Rostock
354	Wilhelm Lauremberg (III) Vice Rector Johannes Albinus Vice Rector Marcus Hasse	1599	Summer	Faculty of Medicine	born in Solingen
355	Johannes Posselius (der Jüngere)	1599	Winter	Faculty of Philosophy	born in Rostock

== 17th century ==
=== 1600–1619 ===
No	Name	Year	Semester	Faculty	Note
356	Johannes Freder der Jüngere (II)	1600	Summer	Faculty of Theology	born in Hamburg
357	Valentin Schacht (V)	1600	Winter	Faculty of Theology	born in Stargard
358	Bartholomäus Klinge (V)	1601	Summer	Faculty of Philosophy	born in Koblenz
359	Martin Chemnitz (1561–1627)	1601	Winter	Faculty of Philosophy	born in Braunschweig
360	Ulrich, Herzog von Pommern (I) Vice Rector Johann Simonis von Burg	1602	Summer	Scholar	
361	Ulrich, Herzog von Pommern (II) Vice Rector Heinrich Pauli	1602	Winter	Scholar	
362	Eilhard Lubinus (I)	1603	Summer	Faculty of Philosophy	born in Westerede
363	Lucas Bacmeister der Ältere (VII)	1603	Winter	Faculty of Theology	born in Lüneburg
364	Ernst Cothmann (I)	1604	Summer	Faculty of Law	born in Lemgo
365	Johann Sibrand (I)	1604	Winter	Faculty of Law	born in Rostock
366	Wilhelm Lauremberg (IV)	1605	Summer	Faculty of Medicine	born in Solingen
367	Nikolaus Willebrand	1605	Winter	Faculty of Philosophy	born in Gorlosen
368	Paul Tarnow (I)	1606	Summer	Faculty of Theology	born in Grevesmühlen
369	Valentin Schacht (VI)	1606	Winter	Faculty of Theology	born in Stargard
370	Bartholomäus Klinge (VI)	1607	Summer	Faculty of Philosophy	born in Koblenz
371	Thomas Lindemann (I)	1607	Winter	Faculty of Law	born in Herford
372	Petrus Sasse	1608	Summer	Faculty of Philosophy	born in Rostock
373	Johannes Assverus Ampsing (I)	1608	Winter	Faculty of Medicine	born in Overijssel
374	Eilhard Lubinus (II)	1609	Summer	Faculty of Theology	born in Westerstede
375	Christian Sledanus	1609	Winter	Faculty of Theology	born in Rostock
376	Ernst Cothmann (II)	1610	Summer	Faculty of Law	born in Lemgo
377	Johann Sibrand (II)	1610	Winter	Faculty of Law	born in Rostock
378	Wilhelm Lauremberg (V)	1611	Summer	Faculty of Medicine	born in Solingen
379	Georg Dasenius (I)	1611	Winter	Faculty of Philosophy	born in Sternberg
380	Paul Tarnow (II)	1612	Summer	Faculty of Theology	born in Grevesmühlen
381	Johannes Affelmann (I)	1612	Winter	Faculty of Theology	born in Soest
382	Joachim Schönermarck (I)	1613	Summer	Faculty of Law	born in Rostock
383	Thomas Lindemann (II)	1613	Winter	Faculty of Law	born in Herford
384	Marcus Hasse (II)	1614	Summer	Faculty of Philosophy	born in Havelberg
385	Johannes Assverus Ampsing (II)	1614	Winter	Faculty of Medicine	born in Overijssel
386	Eilhard Lubinus (III)	1615	Summer	Faculty of Theology	born in Westerstede
387	Johann Quistorp der Ältere (I)	1615	Winter	Faculty of Theology	born in Rostock
388	Ernst Cothmann (III)	1616	Summer	Faculty of Law	born in Lemgo
389	Thomas Lindemann (III)	1616	Winter	Faculty of Law	born in Herford
390	Johann Bacmeister der Ältere (I)	1617	Summer	Faculty of Medicine	born in Rostock
391	Johann Sleker	1617	Winter	Faculty of Philosophy	born in Gartz
392	Paul Tarnow (III)	1618	Summer	Faculty of Theology	born in Grevesmühlen
393	Johannes Affelmann (II)	1618	Winter	Faculty of Theology	born in Soest
394	Joachim Schönermarck (II)	1619	Summer	Faculty of Law	born in Rostock
395	Thomas Lindemann (IV)	1619	Winter	Faculty of Law	born in Herford

=== 1620–1639 ===
No	Name	Year	Semester	Faculty	Note
396	Johann Lauremberg	1620	Summer	Faculty of Philosophy	born in Rostock
397	Johannes Assverus Ampsing (III)	1620	Winter	Faculty of Medicine	born in Overijssel
398	Eilhard Lubinus (IV) Johannes Bacmeister (II), substitutus	1621	Summer	Faculty of Theology	born in Westerstede verst. on 02.06.1621
399	Johann Quistorp der Ältere (II)	1621	Winter	Faculty of Theology	born in Rostock
400	Ernst Cothmann (IV) Johannes Bacmeister (III), substitutus	1622	Summer	Faculty of Law	born in Lemgo
401	Thomas Lindemann (V)	1622	Winter	Faculty of Law	born in Herford
402	Johann Bacmeister der Ältere (IV)	1623	Summer	Faculty of Medicine	born in Rostock
403	Johann Huswedel (I)	1623	Winter	Faculty of Philosophy	born in Hamburg
404	Paul Tarnow (IV)	1624	Summer	Faculty of Theology	born in Grevesmühlen
405	Johann Quistorp der Ältere (III)	1624	Winter	Faculty of Theology	born in Rostock
406	Joachim Schönermarck (III)	1625	Summer	Faculty of Law	born in Rostock
407	Thomas Lindemann (VI)	1625	Winter	Faculty of Law	born in Herford
408	Johann Bacmeister der Ältere (V)	1626	Summer	Faculty of Medicine	born in Rostock
409	Johannes Assverus Ampsing (IV)	1626	Winter	Faculty of Medicine	born in Overijssel
410	Johann Cothmann (I)	1627	Summer	Faculty of Theology	born in Herford
411	Johann Quistorp der Ältere (IV)	1627	Winter	Faculty of Theology	born in Rostock
412	Peter Wasmund (I)	1628	Summer	Faculty of Law	born in Neubrandenburg
413	Thomas Lindemann (VII)	1628	Winter	Faculty of Law	born in Herford
414	Johann Bacmeister der Ältere (VI)	1629	Summer	Faculty of Medicine	born in Rostock
415	Joachim Stockmann (I)	1629	Winter	Faculty of Philosophy	born in Rostock
416	Paul Tarnow (V)	1630	Summer	Faculty of Theology	born in Grevesmühlen
417	Johann Quistorp der Ältere (V)	1630	Winter	Faculty of Theology	born in Rostock
418	Peter Wasmund (II)	1631	Summer	Faculty of Law	born in Neubrandenburg
419	Thomas Lindemann (VIII) Johann Quistorp der Ältere (VI), substitutus	1631	Winter	Faculty of Law	born in Herford verst. on 14.03.1632
420	Jakob Fabricius (I)	1632	Summer	Faculty of Medicine	born in Rostock
421	Joachim Stockmann (II)	1632	Winter	Faculty of Philosophy	born in Rostock
422	Johann Cothmann (II)	1633	Summer	Faculty of Theology	born in Herford
423	Stephan Klotz	1633	Winter	Faculty of Theology	born in Lippstedt
424	Heinrich Schuckmann (I)	1634	Summer	Faculty of Law	born in Osnabrück
425	Nikolaus Schütze (I)	1634	Winter	Faculty of Law	born in Rostock
426	Peter Lauremberg	1635	Summer	Faculty of Philosophy	born in Rostock
427	Georg Dasenius (II)	1635	Winter	Faculty of Philosophy	born in Sternberg
428	Jakob Fabricius (II)	1636	Summer	Faculty of Medicine	born in Rostock
429	Johann Quistorp der Ältere (VII)	1636	Winter	Faculty of Theology	born in Rostock
430	Heinrich Rahn (I)	1637	Summer	Faculty of Law	born in Braunschweig
431	Johann Kleinschmidt	1637	Winter	Faculty of Law	born in Rostock
432	Heinrich Rahn (II)	1638	Summer	Faculty of Law	born in Braunschweig
433	Johann Huswedel (II)	1638	Winter	Faculty of Philosophy	born in Hamburg
434	Johann Cothmann (III)	1639	Summer	Faculty of Theology	born in Herford
435	Johann Quistorp der Ältere (VIII)	1639	Winter	Faculty of Theology	born in Rostock

=== 1640–1659 ===
No	Name	Year	Semester	Faculty	Note
436	Heinrich Schuckmann (II)	1640	Summer	Faculty of Law	born in Osnabrück
437	Nikolaus Schütze (II)	1640	Winter	Faculty of Law	born in Rostock
438	Johann Cothmann (IV)	1641	Summer	Faculty of Theology	born in Herford
439	Johann Quistorp der Ältere (IX)	1641	Winter	Faculty of Theology	born in Rostock
440	Heinrich Schuckmann (III)	1642	Summer	Faculty of Law	born in Osnabrück
441	Joachim Schnobel (I)	1642	Winter	Faculty of Law	born in Salzwedel
442	Stephan Hein Heinrich Rahn (III), substitutus	1643	Summer	Faculty of Law	born in Rostock verst. on 02.06.1643
443	Joachim Stockmann (III)	1643	Winter	Faculty of Medicine	born in Rostock
444	Johann Cothmann (V)	1644	Summer	Faculty of Theology	born in Herford
445	Johann Quistorp der Ältere (X)	1644	Winter	Faculty of Theology	born in Rostock
446	Heinrich Schuckmann (IV)	1645	Summer	Faculty of Law	born in Osnabrück
447	Nikolaus Schütze (III)	1645	Winter	Faculty of Law	born in Rostock
448	Heinrich Rahn (IV)	1646	Summer	Faculty of Law	born in Braunschweig
449	Joachim Lütkemann	1646	Winter	Faculty of Philosophy	born in Demmin
450	Hermann Schuckmann (I)	1647	Summer	Faculty of Theology	born in Rostock
451	Johann Quistorp der Ältere (XI)	1647	Winter	Faculty of Theology	born in Rostock
452	Heinrich Rahn (V)	1648	Summer	Faculty of Law	born in Braunschweig
453	Joachim Schnobel (II)	1648	Winter	Faculty of Law	born in Salzwedel
454	Andreas Tscherning	1649	Summer	Faculty of Philosophy	born in Bunzlau
455	Joachim Stockmann (IV)	1649	Winter	Faculty of Medicine	born in Rostock
456	Johann Cothmann (VI) Hermann Schuckmann (II), substitutus	1650	Summer	Faculty of Theology	born in Herford verst. on 06.10.1650
457	Casper Mauritius (I)	1650	Winter	Faculty of Theology	born in Tondern
458	Heinrich Rahn (VI)	1651	Summer	Faculty of Law	born in Braunschweig
459	Nikolaus Schütze (IV)	1651	Winter	Faculty of Law	born in Rostock
460	August Varenius (I)	1652	Summer	Faculty of Philosophy	born in Hitzacker
461	Johannes Korff	1652	Winter	Faculty of Philosophy	born in Rostock
462	Hermann Schuckmann (III)	1653	Summer	Faculty of Theology	born in Rostock
463	Johann Quistorp der Jüngere (I)	1653	Winter	Faculty of Theology	born in Rostock
464	Heinrich Schuckmann (V)	1654	Summer	Faculty of Law	born in Osnabrück
465	Hermann Lembke (I)	1654	Winter	Faculty of Law	born in Rostock
466	August Varenius (II)	1655	Summer	Faculty of Philosophy	born in Hitzacker
467	Johann Bacmeister der Jüngere (I)	1655	Winter	Faculty of Medicine	born in Lüneburg
468	Johann Georg Dorscheus (I)	1656	Summer	Faculty of Theology	born in Straßburg
469	Casper Mauritius (II)	1656	Winter	Faculty of Theology	born in Tondern
470	Heinrich Rahn (VII)	1657	Summer	Faculty of Law	born in Braunschweig
471	Hermann Lembke (II)	1657	Winter	Faculty of Law	born in Rostock
472	Caspar March (I)	1658	Summer	Faculty of Medicine	born in Penkun
473	Michael Cobabus (I)	1658	Winter	Faculty of Philosophy	born in Sternberg
474	Hermann Schuckmann (IV)	1659	Summer	Faculty of Theology	born in Rostock verst. on 15.12.1659
475	Johann Georg Dorscheus (II)	1659	Summer	Faculty of Theology	born in Straßburg
476	Johann Quistorp der Jüngere (II)	1659	Winter	Faculty of Theology	born in Rostock

=== 1660–1679 ===
No	Name	Year	Semester	Faculty	Note
477	Albert Willebrand der Ältere (I)	1660	Summer	Faculty of Law	born in Rostock
478	Heinrich Rudolf Redeker (I)	1660	Winter	Faculty of Law	born in Osnabrück
479	Lorenz von Bodock	1661	Summer	Faculty of Philosophy	born in Posen
480	Johann Bacmeister der Jüngere (II)	1661	Winter	Faculty of Medicine	born in Lüneburg
481	August Varenius (III)	1662	Summer	Faculty of Philosophy	born in Hitzacker
482	Johann Quistorp der Jüngere (III)	1662	Winter	Faculty of Theology	born in Rostock
483	Albert Willebrand der Ältere (II)	1663	Summer	Faculty of Law	born in Rostock
484	Heinrich Müller (Theologe) (I)	1663	Winter	Faculty of Theology	born in Lübeck
485	Caspar March (II)	1664	Summer	Faculty of Medicine	born in Penkun
486	Heinrich Dringenberg (I)	1664	Winter	Faculty of Philosophy	born in Rostock
487	August Varenius (IV)	1665	Summer	Faculty of Philosophy	born in Hitzacker
488	Heinrich Müller (Theologe) (II)	1665	Winter	Faculty of Theology	born in Lübeck
489	Heinrich Rudolf Redeker (II)	1666	Summer	Faculty of Law	born in Osnabrück
490	Hermann Lembke (III) Vice Rector Heinrich Rudolf Redeker	1666	Winter	Faculty of Law	born in Rostock
491	Heinrich Dringenberg (II) Vice Rector Heinrich Rudolf Redeker	1667	Summer	Faculty of Philosophy	born in Rostock
492	Georg Radow (I)	1667	Winter	Faculty of Law	born in Liebenwalde
493	Heinrich Dringenberg (III)	1668	Summer	Faculty of Philosophy	born in Rostock
494	Johan Jacob Döbelius der Ältere (I)	1668	Winter	Faculty of Medicine	born in Danzig
495	August Varenius (V)	1669	Summer	Faculty of Philosophy	born in Hitzacker
496	Johann Quistorp der Jüngere (IV)	1669	Winter	Faculty of Theology	born in Rostock verst. on 24.12.1669
497	Heinrich Müller (Theologe) (III)	1669	Winter	Faculty of Theology	born in Lübeck
498	Albert Willebrand der Ältere (III)	1670	Summer	Faculty of Law	born in Rostock
499	Georg Radow (II)	1670	Winter	Faculty of Law	born in Liebenwalde
500	Johann Bacmeister der Jüngere (III)	1671	Summer	Faculty of Medicine	born in Lüneburg
501	Hermann Becker der Ältere (I)	1671	Winter	Faculty of Philosophy	born in Rostock
502	August Varenius (VI)	1672	Summer	Faculty of Philosophy	born in Hitzacker
503	Michael Cobabus (II)	1672	Winter	Faculty of Philosophy	born in Sternberg
504	Heinrich Rudolf Redeker (III)	1673	Summer	Faculty of Law	born in Osnabrück
505	Georg Radow (III)	1673	Winter	Faculty of Law	born in Liebenwalde
506	Franz Wolff (I)	1674	Summer	Faculty of Theology	born in Stralsund
507	Johan Jacob Döbelius der Ältere (II) Vice Rector Michael Cobabus	1674	Winter	Faculty of Medicine	born in Danzig
508	Heinrich Rudolf Redeker (IV)	1675	Summer	Faculty of Law	born in Osnabrück
509	Michael Cobabus (III) Vice Rector Georg Radow	1675	Winter	Faculty of Philosophy	born in Sternberg
510	Heinrich Rudolf Redeker (V)	1676	Summer	Faculty of Law	born in Osnabrück
511	Jakob Lembke (I)	1676	Winter	Faculty of Law	born in Rostock
512	Johann Bacmeister der Jüngere (IV)	1677	Summer	Faculty of Medicine	born in Lüneburg
513	Johann Mantzel	1677	Winter	Faculty of Philosophy	born in Rostock
514	August Varenius (VII)	1678	Summer	Faculty of Philosophy	born in Hitzacker
515	Hermann Becker der Ältere (II)	1678	Winter	Faculty of Philosophy	born in Rostock
516	Heinrich Rudolf Redeker (VI)	1679	Summer	Faculty of Law	born in Osnabrück
517	Georg Radow (IV)	1679	Winter	Faculty of Law	born in Liebenwalde

=== 1680–1699 ===
No	Name	Year	Semester	Faculty	Note
518	Heinrich Dringenberg (IV)	1680	Summer	Faculty of Philosophy	born in Rostock
519	Georg Radow (V)	1680	Winter	Faculty of Law	born in Liebenwalde
520	August Varenius (VIII)	1681	Summer	Faculty of Philosophy	born in Hitzacker
521	Franz Wolff (II)	1681	Winter	Faculty of Theology	born in Stralsund
522	Andreas Amsel Vice-Rector Johann Bacmeister der Jüngere	1682	Summer	Faculty of Law	born in Rostock
523	Jakob Lembke (II)	1682	Winter	Faculty of Law	born in Rostock
524	Johann Bacmeister der Jüngere (V)	1683	Summer	Faculty of Medicine	born in Lüneburg
525	Gottlob Friedrich Seligmann	1683	Winter	Faculty of Philosophy	born in Haynewalde
526	Johann Bacmeister der Jüngere (VI)	1684	Summer	Faculty of Medicine	born in Lüneburg
527	Franz Wolff (III)	1684	Winter	Faculty of Theology	born in Stralsund
528	Christoph Redeker (I)	1685	Summer	Faculty of Law	born in Osnabrück
529	Georg Radow (VI)	1685	Winter	Faculty of Law	born in Liebenwalde
530	Christian Hildebrand (I)	1686	Summer	Faculty of Philosophy	born in Rügenwalde
531	Bernhard Barnstorff (I)	1686	Winter	Faculty of Medicine	born in Rostock
532	Justus Christoph Schomer (I)	1687	Summer	Faculty of Theology	born in Lübeck
533	Justus Christoph Schomer (II)	1687	Winter	Faculty of Theology	born in Lübeck
-	unbesetzt	1688 bis 1689	-	Faculty of Law	Vice-Rector Christoph Redeker
534	Johann Festing (I)	1689	Summer	Faculty of Law	born in Lübeck
535	Johann Festing (II)	1689	Winter	Faculty of Law	born in Lübeck
536	Johann Festing (III)	1690	Summer	Faculty of Law	born in Lübeck
537	Gottfried Weiß (I)	1690	Winter	Faculty of Philosophy	born in Preußisch-Holland
538	Johannes Fecht (I)	1691	Summer	Faculty of Theology	born in Sulzberg
539	Bernhard Barnstorff (II)	1691	Winter	Faculty of Medicine	born in Rostock
540	Christoph Redeker (II)	1692	Summer	Faculty of Law	born in Osnabrück
541	Gottfried Weiß (II)	1692	Winter	Faculty of Philosophy	born in Preußisch-Holland
542	Johann Klein (I)	1693	Summer	Faculty of Law	born in Rostock
543	Johann Nikolaus Quistorp (I)	1693	Winter	Faculty of Theology	born in Rostock
544	Johann Joachim Schöpfer (I)	1694	Summer	Faculty of Law	born in Quedlinburg
545	Matthias Stein (I)	1694	Winter	Faculty of Law	born in Rostock
546	Heinrich Christian Tielcke (I)	1695	Summer	Faculty of Philosophy	born in Rederank
547	Bernhard Barnstorff (III)	1695	Winter	Faculty of Medicine	born in Rostock
548	Bernhard Barnstorff (IV)	1696	Summer	Faculty of Medicine	born in Rostock
549	Bernhard Barnstorff (V)	1696	Winter	Faculty of Medicine	born in Rostock
550	Johannes Fecht (II)	1697	Summer	Faculty of Theology	born in Sulzberg
551	Johann Nikolaus Quistorp (II)	1697	Winter	Faculty of Theology	born in Rostock
552	Johann Klein (II)	1698	Summer	Faculty of Law	born in Rostock
553	Matthias Stein (II)	1698	Winter	Faculty of Law	born in Rostock
554	Johann Ernst Schaper (I)	1699	Summer	Faculty of Medicine	born in Küstrin
555	Caspar Matthäus Müller	1699	Winter	Faculty of Philosophy	born in Rostock

== 18th century ==
=== 1700–1719 ===
No	Name	Year	Semester	Faculty	Note
556	Johann Peter Grünenberg (I)	1700	Summer	Faculty of Theology	born in Harburg
557	Johann Nikolaus Quistorp (III)	1700	Winter	Faculty of Theology	born in Rostock
558	Johann Joachim Schöpfer (II)	1701	Summer	Faculty of Law	born in Quedlinburg
559	Johann Barnstorff	1701	Winter	Faculty of Law	born in Rostock
560	Christian Hildebrand (II)	1702	Summer	Faculty of Philosophy	born in Rügenwalde
561	Bernhard Barnstorff (VI)	1702	Winter	Faculty of Medicine	born in Rostock
562	Johannes Fecht (III)	1703	Summer	Faculty of Theology	born in Sulzberg
563	Johann Nikolaus Quistorp (IV)	1703	Winter	Faculty of Theology	born in Rostock
564	Johann Klein (III)	1704	Summer	Faculty of Law	born in Rostock
565	Matthias Stein (III)	1704	Winter	Faculty of Law	born in Rostock
566	Johann Ernst Schaper (II)	1705	Summer	Faculty of Medicine	born in Küstrin
567	Jakob Burgmann (I)	1705	Winter	Faculty of Philosophy	born in Königsberg (Neumark)
568	Johann Peter Grünenberg (II)	1706	Summer	Faculty of Theology	born in Harburg
569	Zacharias Grape (der Jüngere)	1706	Winter	Faculty of Theology	born in Rostock
570	Johann Joachim Schöpfer (III)	1707	Summer	Faculty of Law	born in Quedlinburg
571	Matthias Stein (IV)	1707	Winter	Faculty of Law	born in Rostock
572	Heinrich Christian Tielcke (II)	1708	Summer	Faculty of Philosophy	born in Rederank
573	Wilhelm David Habermann (I)	1708	Winter	Faculty of Medicine	born in Rostock
574	Johannes Fecht (IV)	1709	Summer	Faculty of Theology	born in Sulzberg
575	Johann Nikolaus Quistorp (V)	1709	Winter	Faculty of Theology	born in Rostock
576	Johann Klein (IV) Vice-Rector Johann Joachim Schöpfer	1710	Summer	Faculty of Law	born in Rostock
577	Matthias Stein (V)	1710	Winter	Faculty of Law	born in Rostock
578	Johann Ernst Schaper (III)	1711	Summer	Faculty of Medicine	born in Küstrin
579	Joachim Heinrich Sibrand (I)	1711	Winter	Faculty of Philosophy	born in Rostock
580	Johannes Fecht (V)	1712	Summer	Faculty of Theology	born in Sulzberg
581	Johann Nikolaus Quistorp (VI)	1712	Winter	Faculty of Theology	born in Rostock
582	Johann Klein (V) Vice-Rector Johann Ernst Schaper	1713	Summer	Faculty of Law	born in Rostock
583	Joachim Heinrich Sibrand (II)	1713	Winter	Faculty of Philosophy	born in Rostock
584	Karl Arnd	1714	Summer	Faculty of Philosophy	born in Güstrow
585	Wilhelm David Habermann (II) Jakob Burgmann (II), substitutus	1714	Winter	Faculty of Medicine	born in Rostock
586	Albrecht Joachim von Krakevitz (I)	1715	Summer	Faculty of Theology	born in Gevezin
587	Peter Becker (Mathematiker) (I)	1715	Winter	Faculty of Philosophy	born in Rostock
588	Johann Joachim Schöpfer (IV) Vice-Rector Albrecht Joachim von Krakevitz	1716	Summer	Faculty of Law	born in Quedlinburg
589	Matthias Stein (VI)	1716	Winter	Faculty of Law	born in Rostock
590	Johann Ernst Schaper (IV) Vice-Rector Karl Arnd	1717	Summer	Faculty of Medicine	born in Küstrin
591	Jakob Burgmann (III)	1717	Winter	Faculty of Philosophy	born in Königsberg (Neumark)
592	Albrecht Joachim von Krakevitz (II)	1718	Summer	Faculty of Theology	born in Gevezin
593	Johann Joachim Weidener (I)	1718	Winter	Faculty of Theology	born in Rostock
594	Jakob Carmon (I)	1719	Summer	Faculty of Law	born in Rostock
595	Joachim Heinrich Sibrand (III)	1719	Winter	Faculty of Philosophy	born in Rostock

=== 1720–1739 ===
No	Name	Year	Semester	Faculty	Note
596	David Heinrich Köpke (I)	1720	Summer	Faculty of Philosophy	born in Bardowick
597	Christoph Martin Burchard (I) Vice-Rector Johann Joachim Weidener	1720	Winter	Faculty of Medicine	born in Kiel
598	Albrecht Joachim von Krakevitz (III)	1721	Summer	Faculty of Theology	born in Gevezin
599	Jakob Carmon (II)	1721	Summer	Faculty of Law	born in Rostock
600	Hermann Christoph Engelke (I)	1721	Winter	Faculty of Theology	born in Jennewitz
601	Jakob Carmon (III)	1722	Summer	Faculty of Law	born in Rostock
602	Johann Christian Petersen (I)	1722	Winter	Faculty of Law	born in Rostock
603	Georg Detharding (I)	1723	Summer	Faculty of Medicine	born in Stralsund
604	Peter Becker (Mathematiker) (II)	1723	Winter	Faculty of Philosophy	born in Rostock
605	Franz Albert Aepinus (I)	1724	Summer	Faculty of Theology	born in Wanzka
606	Johann Joachim Weidener (II)	1724	Winter	Faculty of Theology	born in Rostock
607	Jakob Carmon (IV) Georg Detharding (II), substitutus	1725	Summer	Faculty of Law	born in Rostock
608	Joachim Heinrich Sibrand (IV)	1725	Winter	Faculty of Philosophy	born in Rostock
609	David Heinrich Köpke (II)	1726	Summer	Faculty of Philosophy	born in Bardowick
610	Christoph Martin Burchard (II)	1726	Winter	Faculty of Medicine	born in Kiel
611	Franz Albert Aepinus (II)	1727	Summer	Faculty of Theology	born in Wanzka
612	Hermann Christoph Engelke (II)	1727	Winter	Faculty of Theology	born in Jennewitz
613	Jakob Carmon (V)	1728	Summer	Faculty of Law	born in Rostock
614	Johann Christian Petersen (II)	1728	Winter	Faculty of Law	born in Rostock
615	Georg Detharding (III)	1729	Summer	Faculty of Medicine	born in Stralsund
616	Ernst Johann Friedrich Mantzel (I)	1729	Winter	Faculty of Philosophy	born in Jördenstorf
617	Franz Albert Aepinus (III)	1730	Summer	Faculty of Theology	born in Wanzka
618	Johann Joachim Weidener (III)	1730	Winter	Faculty of Theology	born in Rostock
619	Jakob Carmon (VI)	1731	Summer	Faculty of Law	born in Rostock
6120	Ernst Johann Friedrich Mantzel (II)	1731	Winter	Faculty of Philosophy	born in Jördenstorf
621	Georg Detharding (IV)	1732	Summer	Faculty of Medicine	born in Stralsund
622	Christoph Martin Burchard (III)	1732	Winter	Faculty of Medicine	born in Kiel
623	Franz Albert Aepinus (IV)	1733	Summer	Faculty of Theology	born in Wanzka
624	Hermann Christoph Engelke (III)	1733	Winter	Faculty of Theology	born in Jennewitz
625	Jakob Carmon (VII)	1734	Summer	Faculty of Law	born in Rostock
626	Ernst Johann Friedrich Mantzel (III)	1734	Winter	Faculty of Philosophy	born in Jördenstorf
627	Georg Christoph Detharding (I)	1735	Summer	Faculty of Medicine	born in Güstrow
628	Jakob Christoph Wolff	1735	Winter	Faculty of Philosophy	born in Rostock
629	Franz Albert Aepinus (V)	1736	Summer	Faculty of Theology	born in Wanzka
630	Johann Christian Burgmann (I)	1736	Winter	Faculty of Theology	born in Rostock
631	Matthias Benoni Hering (I)	1737	Summer	Faculty of Law	born in Zwilipp
632	Johann Peter Schmidt (I)	1737	Winter	Faculty of Law	born in Rostock
633	Johann Ludwig Engel	1738	Summer	Faculty of Philosophy	born in Grabow
634	Christoph Martin Burchard (IV)	1738	Winter	Faculty of Medicine	born in Kiel
635	Franz Albert Aepinus (VI)	1739	Summer	Faculty of Theology	born in Wanzka
636	Hermann Christoph Engelke (IV)	1739	Winter	Faculty of Theology	born in Jennewitz

=== 1740–1759 ===
No	Name	Year	Semester	Faculty	Note
637	Jakob Carmon (VIII)	1740	Summer	Faculty of Law	born in Rostock
638	Ernst Johann Friedrich Mantzel (IV)	1740	Winter	Faculty of Philosophy	born in Jördenstorf
639	Georg Christoph Detharding (II)	1741	Summer	Faculty of Medicine	born in Güstrow
640	Heinrich Becker (I)	1741	Winter	Faculty of Philosophy	born in Rostock
641	Franz Albert Aepinus (VII)	1742	Summer	Faculty of Theology	born in Wanzka
642	Johann Christian Burgmann (II)	1742	Winter	Faculty of Theology	born in Rostock
643	Matthias Benoni Hering (II)	1743	Summer	Faculty of Law	born in Zwilipp
644	Johann Peter Schmidt (II)	1743	Winter	Faculty of Law	born in Rostock
645	Paul Theodor Carpow (I)	1744	Summer	Faculty of Philosophy	born in Bottschow
646	Johann Bernhard Quistorp (I)	1744	Winter	Faculty of Medicine	born in Rostock
647	Franz Albert Aepinus (VIII)	1745	Summer	Faculty of Theology	born in Wanzka
648	Heinrich Becker (Theologe) (II)	1745	Winter	Faculty of Philosophy	born in Rostock
649	Matthias Benoni Hering (III)	1746	Summer	Faculty of Law	born in Zwilipp
650	Johann Peter Schmidt (III)	1746	Winter	Faculty of Law	born in Rostock
651	Georg Christoph Detharding (III)	1747	Summer	Faculty of Medicine	born in Güstrow
652	Peter Christian Kämpfer	1747	Winter	Faculty of Philosophy	born in Dreveskirchen
653	Friedrich (Mecklenburg) (I) Vice-Rector Franz Albert Aepinus	1748	Summer	Scholar	Duke of Mecklenburg
654	Friedrich (Mecklenburg) (II) Vice-Rector Johann Christian Burgmann	1748	Winter	Scholar	Duke of Mecklenburg
655	Friedrich (Mecklenburg) (III) Vice-Rector Matthias Benoni Hering	1749	Summer	Scholar	Duke of Mecklenburg
656	Friedrich (Mecklenburg) (IV) Vice-Rector Hermann Becker	1749	Winter	Scholar	Duke of Mecklenburg
657	Friedrich (Mecklenburg) (V) Vice-Rector Angelius Johann Daniel Aepinus	1750	Summer	Scholar	Duke of Mecklenburg
658	Friedrich (Mecklenburg) (VI) Vice-Rector Johann Bernhard Quistorp	1750	Winter	Scholar	Duke of Mecklenburg
659	Friedrich (Mecklenburg) (VII) Vice-Rector Petrus Sasse	1751	Summer	Scholar	Duke of Mecklenburg
660	Friedrich (Mecklenburg) (VIII) Vice-Rector Heinrich Becker	1751	Winter	Scholar	Duke of Mecklenburg
661	Friedrich (Mecklenburg) (IX) Vice-Rector Johann Nikolaus Pele	1752	Summer	Scholar	Duke of Mecklenburg
662	Friedrich (Mecklenburg) (X) Vice-Rector Hermann Becker (Jurist)	1752	Winter	Scholar	Duke of Mecklenburg
663	Friedrich (Mecklenburg) (XI) Vice-Rector Georg Christoph Detharding	1753	Summer	Scholar	Duke of Mecklenburg
664	Friedrich (Mecklenburg) (XII) Vice-Rector Joachim Hinrich Prieß	1753	Winter	Scholar	Duke of Mecklenburg
665	Friedrich (Mecklenburg) (XIII) Vice-Rector Joachim Hartmann	1754	Summer	Scholar	Duke of Mecklenburg
666	Friedrich (Mecklenburg) (XIV) Vice-Rector Johann Christian Burgmann	1754	Winter	Scholar	Duke of Mecklenburg
667	Friedrich (Mecklenburg) (XV) Vice-Rector Ernst Johann Friedrich Mantzel	1755	Summer	Scholar	Duke of Mecklenburg
668	Friedrich (Mecklenburg) (XVI) Vice-Rector Jakob Heinrich Beleke	1755	Winter	Scholar	Duke of Mecklenburg
669	Johann Christian Eschenbach	1756	Summer	Faculty of Philosophy	born in Rostock
670	Johann Bernhard Quistorp (II)	1756	Winter	Faculty of Medicine	born in Rostock
671	Angelius Johann Daniel Aepinus	1757	Summer	Faculty of Philosophy	born in Rostock
672	Heinrich Becker (Theologe) (III)	1757	Winter	Faculty of Theology	born in Rostock
673	Ernst Johann Friedrich Mantzel (V)	1758	Summer	Faculty of Philosophy	born in Jördenstorf
674	Hermann Becker (Jurist)	1758	Winter	Faculty of Philosophy	born in Rostock
675	Georg Christoph Detharding (IV)	1759	Summer	Faculty of Medicine	born in Güstrow
676	Johann Jakob Quistorp (I)	1759	Winter	Faculty of Philosophy	born in Rostock

=== 1760–1779 ===
No	Name	Year	Semester	Faculty	Note
677	Christian Albrecht Döderlein	1760	Summer	Faculty of Theology	born in Segringen
678	Johann Christian Burgmann (III)	1760	Winter	Faculty of Theology	born in Rostock
679	Johann Jakob Quistorp (II)	1761	Summer	Faculty of Philosophy	born in Rostock
680	Jakob Heinrich Beleke (I)	1761	Winter	Faculty of Law	born in Parchim
681	Joachim Hinrich Prieß (I)	1762	Summer	Faculty of Philosophy	born in Rostock
682	Christian Ehrenfried Eschenbach (I)	1762	Winter	Faculty of Medicine	born in Rostock
683	Heinrich Becker (IV)	1763	Summer	Faculty of Theology	born in Rostock
684	Jakob Heinrich Beleke (II)	1763	Winter	Faculty of Law	born in Parchim
685	Johann Jakob Quistorp (III)	1764	Summer	Faculty of Philosophy	born in Rostock
686	Heinrich Becker (Theologe) (V)	1764	Winter	Faculty of Theology	born in Rostock
687	Heinrich Valentin Becker (I)	1765	Summer	Faculty of Philosophy	born in Rostock
688	Christian Ehrenfried Eschenbach (II)	1765	Winter	Faculty of Medicine	born in Rostock
689	Heinrich Becker (VI)	1766	Summer	Faculty of Theology	born in Rostock
690	Johann Jakob Quistorp (IV) Christian Ehrenfried Eschenbach (III) substitutus	1766	Winter	Faculty of Philosophy	born in Rostock verst. on 25.12.1766
691	Heinrich Valentin Becker (II)	1767	Summer	Faculty of Philosophy	born in Rostock
692	Heinrich Becker (Theologe) (VII)	1767	Winter	Faculty of Theology	born in Rostock
693	Hermann Jakob Lasius (I)	1768	Summer	Faculty of Philosophy	born in Greifswald
694	Christian Ehrenfried Eschenbach (IV)	1768	Winter	Faculty of Medicine	born in Rostock
695	Heinrich Becker (VIII)	1769	Summer	Faculty of Theology	born in Rostock
696	Jakob Friedrich Rönnberg (I)	1769	Winter	Faculty of Philosophy	born in Parchim
697	Hermann Jakob Lasius (II)	1770	Summer	Faculty of Philosophy	born in Greifswald
698	Heinrich Becker (Theologe) (IX)	1770	Winter	Faculty of Theology	born in Rostock
699	Joachim Hartmann (I)	1771	Summer	Faculty of Philosophy	
700	Christian Ehrenfried Eschenbach (V)	1771	Winter	Faculty of Medicine	born in Rostock
701	Heinrich Becker (X)	1772	Summer	Faculty of Theology	born in Rostock
702	Heinrich Valentin Becker (III)	1772	Winter	Faculty of Philosophy	born in Rostock
703	Jakob Friedrich Rönnberg (II)	1773	Summer	Faculty of Philosophy	born in Parchim
704	Heinrich Becker (XI) Vice-Rector Jakob Friedrich Rönnberg	1773	Winter	Faculty of Theology	born in Rostock
705	Christian Ehrenfried Eschenbach (VI)	1774	Summer	Faculty of Medicine	born in Rostock
706	Christian Ehrenfried Eschenbach (VII)	1774	Winter	Faculty of Medicine	born in Rostock
707	Joachim Hartmann (II)	1775	Summer	Faculty of Philosophy	
708	Heinrich Valentin Becker (IV)	1775	Winter	Faculty of Philosophy	born in Rostock
709	Heinrich Valentin Becker (V)	1776	Summer	Faculty of Philosophy	born in Rostock
710	Joachim Hartmann (III)	1776	Winter	Faculty of Philosophy	
711	Walter Vincent Wiese (I)	1777	Summer	Faculty of Law	born in Rostock
712	Christian Ehrenfried Eschenbach (VIII)	1777	Winter	Faculty of Medicine	born in Rostock
713	Joachim Hartmann (IV)	1778	Summer	Faculty of Philosophy	
714	Walter Vincent Wiese (II)	1778	Winter	Faculty of Law	born in Rostock
715	Hermann Jakob Lasius (III)	1779	Summer	Faculty of Philosophy	born in Greifswald
716	Joachim Hinrich Prieß (II)	1779	Winter	Faculty of Philosophy	born in Rostock

=== 1780–1799 ===
Since unification of Bützow University and Rostock University in 1789, Rectors were elected for one year.

No	Name	Year	Semester	Faculty	Note
717	Walter Vincent Wiese (III)	1780	Summer	Faculty of Law born in Rostock	
718	Christian Ehrenfried Eschenbach (IX)	1780	Winter	Faculty of Medicine	born in Rostock
719	Joachim Hartmann (V)	1781	Summer	Faculty of Philosophy	
720	Johann Christian Eschenbach (I)	1781	Winter	Faculty of Philosophy	born in Rostock
721	Jakob Friedrich Rönnberg (III)	1782	Summer	Faculty of Philosophy	born in Parchim
722	Joachim Hinrich Prieß (III)	1782	Winter	Faculty of Philosophy	born in Rostock
723	Walter Vincent Wiese (IV)	1783	Summer	Faculty of Law	born in Rostock
724	Christian Ehrenfried Eschenbach (X)	1783	Winter	Faculty of Medicine	born in Rostock
725	Joachim Hartmann (VI)	1784	Summer	Faculty of Philosophy	
726	Johann Christian Eschenbach (II)	1784	Winter	Faculty of Philosophy	born in Rostock
727	Gustav Schadeloock (I)	1785	Summer	Faculty of Philosophy	born in Stettin
728	Joachim Hinrich Prieß (IV)	1785	Winter	Faculty of Philosophy	born in Rostock
729	Walter Vincent Wiese (V)	1786	Summer	Faculty of Law	born in Rostock
730	Christian Ehrenfried Eschenbach (XI)	1786	Winter	Faculty of Medicine	born in Rostock
731	Joachim Hartmann (VII)	1787	Summer	Faculty of Philosophy	
732	Johann Christian Eschenbach (III)	1787	Winter	Faculty of Philosophy	born in Rostock
733	Heinrich Valentin Becker (VI)	1788	Summer	Faculty of Philosophy	born in Rostock
734	Joachim Hinrich Prieß (V)	1788	Winter	Faculty of Philosophy	born in Rostock
735	Johann Casper Velthusen	1789	Summer	Faculty of Theology	
736	Joachim Hartmann (VIII)	1790	Summer	Faculty of Philosophy	
737	Heinrich Valentin Becker (VII)	1791	Summer	Faculty of Philosophy	born in Rostock
738	Hermann Jakob Lasius (IV)	1792	Summer	Faculty of Philosophy	born in Greifswald
739	Jakob Friedrich Rönnberg (IV)	1793	Summer	Faculty of Philosophy	born in Parchim
740	Samuel Simon Witte (I)	1794	Summer	Faculty of Philosophy	born in Röbel
741	Johann Matthias Martini (I)	1795	Summer	Faculty of Law	born in Rostock
742	Gustav Schadeloock (II)	1796	Summer	Faculty of Philosophy	born in Stettin
743	Walter Vincent Wiese (VI)	1797	Summer	Faculty of Law	born in Rostock
744	Johann Christian Eschenbach (IV)	1798	Summer	Faculty of Philosophy	born in Rostock
745	Peter Johann Hecker (I)	1799	Summer	Faculty of Philosophy	born in Stargard

== 19th century ==
=== 1800–1824 ===
No	Name	Year	Semester	Faculty	Note
746	Johann Matthias Martini (II)	1800	Summer	Faculty of Law	born in Rostock
747	Samuel Gottlieb Vogel	1801	Summer	Faculty of Medicine	
748	Christian David Anton Martini	1802	Summer	Faculty of Theology	
749	Gerhard Philipp Heinrich Norrmann (I)	1803	Summer	Faculty of Philosophy	
750	Adolf Felix Heinrich Posse Gerhard Philipp Heinrich Norrmann (II), substitutus	1804	Summer	Faculty of Law	
751	Wilhelm Josephi (I)	1805	Summer	Faculty of Medicine	
752	Heinrich Friedrich Link (I)	1806	Summer	Faculty of Philosophy	
753	Heinrich Friedrich Link (II)	1807	Summer	Faculty of Philosophy	
754	Jakob Sigismund Beck (I)	1808	Summer	Faculty of Philosophy	
755	Johann Friedrich Prieß (I)	1809	Summer	Faculty of Philosophy	
756	Christian Gottlieb Konopack	1810	Summer	Faculty of Law	
757	Georg Heinrich Masius (I)	1811	Summer	Faculty of Medicine	
758	Johann Friedrich Prieß (II)	1812	Summer	Faculty of Philosophy	
759	Immanuel Gottlieb Huschke	1813	Summer	Faculty of Philosophy	
760	Johann Christian Eschenbach (V)	1814	Summer	Faculty of Philosophy	born in Rostock
761	Johann Christian Eschenbach (VI)	1815	Summer	Faculty of Philosophy	born in Rostock
762	Jakob Sigismund Beck (II)	1816	Summer	Faculty of Philosophy	
763	Jakob Sigismund Beck (III)	1817	Summer	Faculty of Philosophy	
764	Johann Friedrich Prieß (III)	1818	Summer	Faculty of Philosophy	
765	Wilhelm Josephi	1819	Summer	Faculty of Medicine	
766	Samuel Gottlob Lange	1820	Summer	Faculty of Theology	
767	Jakob Sigismund Beck (IV)	1821	Summer	Faculty of Philosophy	
768	Johann Friedrich Prieß (IV)	1822	Summer	Faculty of Philosophy	
769	Georg Heinrich Masius (II)	1823	Summer	Faculty of Medicine	verst. on 25.08.1823
770	Jakob Sigismund Beck (V)	1823	Summer	Faculty of Philosophy	Appointed on 01.07.1823
771	Gustav Friedrich Wiggers (I)	1824	Summer	Faculty of Theology	born in Biestow

=== 1825–1849 ===
No	Name	Year	Semester	Faculty	Note
772	Anton Theodor Hartmann	1825	Summer	Faculty of Theology	
773	Ferdinand Kämmerer	1826	Summer	Faculty of Law	
774	Heinrich Gustav Flörke	1827	Summer	Faculty of Philosophy	
775	Gustav Mahl	1828	Summer	Faculty of Philosophy	
776	August Ludwig Diemer	1829	Summer	Faculty of Law	
777	Johann Philipp Bauermeister (I)	1830	Summer	Faculty of Theology	
778	Heinrich Spitta	1831	Summer	Faculty of Medicine	
779	Karl Strempel	1832	Summer	Faculty of Medicine	
780	Carl Friedrich August Fritzsche	1833	Summer	Faculty of Theology	
781	Christian Friedrich Elvers	1834	Summer	Faculty of Medicine	
782	Carl Friedrich Quittenbaum	1835	Summer	Faculty of Medicine	
783	Franz Volkmar Fritzsche	1836	Summer	Faculty of Philosophy	
784	Gustav Friedrich Wiggers (II)	1837	Summer	Faculty of Theology	born in Biestow
785	Gustav Friedrich Wiggers (III)	1838	Summer	Faculty of Theology	born in Biestow
786	Gustav Friedrich Wiggers (IV)	1839	Summer	Faculty of Theology	born in Biestow
787	Johann Philipp Bauermeister (II)	1840	Summer	Faculty of Theology	
788	Johann Philipp Bauermeister (III)	1841	Summer	Faculty of Theology	
789	Johannes Roeper (I)	1842	Summer	Faculty of Philosophy	
790	Johannes Roeper (II)	1843	Summer	Faculty of Philosophy	
791	Hermann Karsten (Mineraloge) (I)	1844	Summer	Faculty of Philosophy	
792	Hermann Karsten (Mineraloge) (II)	1845	Summer	Faculty of Philosophy	
793	Christian Wilbrandt (I)	1846	Summer	Faculty of Philosophy	born in Neukirchen
794	Christian Wilbrandt (II)	1847	Summer	Faculty of Philosophy	born in Neukirchen
795	Johann Heinrich Thöl (I)	1848	Summer	Faculty of Law	
796	Hermann Karsten (III)	1848	Winter	Faculty of Philosophy	Appointed on 02.11.1848
797	Hermann Stannius (I)	1849	Summer	Faculty of Medicine	

=== 1850–1874 ===
No	Name	Year	Semester	Faculty	Note
798	Hermann Stannius (II)	1850	Summer	Faculty of Medicine	
799	Otto Carsten Krabbe (I)	1851	Summer	Faculty of Theology	
800	Otto Carsten Krabbe (II)	1852	Summer	Faculty of Theology	
801	Otto Carsten Krabbe (III)	1853	Summer	Faculty of Theology	
802	Carl Hegel (I)	1854	Summer	Faculty of Philosophy	
803	Carl Hegel (II)	1855	Summer	Faculty of Philosophy	
804	Franz Ferdinand Schulze (I)	1856	Summer	Faculty of Philosophy	
805	Franz Ferdinand Schulze (II)	1857	Summer	Faculty of Philosophy	
806	Karl Bergmann (I)	1858	Summer	Faculty of Medicine	
807	Karl Bergmann (II)	1859	Summer	Faculty of Medicine	
808	Georg Wilhelm Wetzell (I)	1860	Summer	Faculty of Law	
809	Georg Wilhelm Wetzell (II)	1861	Summer	Faculty of Law	
810	Johannes Roeper (III)	1862	Summer	Faculty of Philosophy	
811	Johannes Roeper (IV)	1863	Summer	Faculty of Philosophy	
812	Otto Carsten Krabbe (IV)	1864	Summer	Faculty of Theology	
813	Otto Carsten Krabbe (V)	1865	Summer	Faculty of Theology	
814	Karl Bartsch (I)	1866	Summer	Faculty of Philosophy	born in Sprottau
815	Karl Bartsch (II)	1867	Summer	Faculty of Philosophy	born in Sprottau
816	Theodor Thierfelder	1868	Summer	Faculty of Medicine	born in Meißen
817	Otto Carsten Krabbe (VI)	1869	Summer	Faculty of Theology	
818	Hermann Aubert (I)	1870	Summer	Faculty of Medicine	
819	Hermann Schwanert	1871	Summer	Faculty of Law	
820	Theodor Muther (V)	1872	Summer	Faculty of Law	
821	Hermann Karsten (Mineraloge) (IV)	1873	Summer	Faculty of Philosophy	
822	Hugo Böhlau (I)	1874	Summer	Faculty of Law	

=== 1875–1899 ===
No	Name	Year	Semester	Faculty	Note
823	Wilhelm von Zehender	1875	Summer	Faculty of Medicine	
824	Hermann Aubert (II)	1876	Summer	Faculty of Medicine	
825	Oscar Jacobsen	1877	Summer	Faculty of Philosophy	
826	Hugo Böhlau (II)	1878	Summer	Faculty of Law	
827	Friedrich Wilhelm Schirrmacher	1878	Summer	Faculty of Philosophy	
828	Johannes Bachmann	1879	Summer	Faculty of Theology	
829	Christian Friedrich Schatz	1880	Summer	Faculty of Medicine	
830	Friedrich Merkel (I)	1881	Summer	Faculty of Medicine	born in Nürnberg
831	Friedrich Merkel (II)	1882	Summer	Faculty of Medicine	born in Nürnberg
832	Albert Thierfelder	1883	Summer	Faculty of Medicine	
833	Karl Birkmeyer	1884	Summer	Faculty of Law	
834	Ludwig Matthiessen	1885	Summer	Faculty of Philosophy	
835	Otoo Nasse	1886	Summer	Faculty of Medicine	
836	August Wilhelm Dieckhoff	1887	Summer	Faculty of Theology	born in Göttingen
837	Hermann Aubert (III)	1888	Summer	Faculty of Medicine	
838	Hermann Aubert (IV)	1889	Summer	Faculty of Medicine	
839	Heinrich von Stein (I)	1890	Summer	Faculty of Philosophy	born in Rostock
840	Heinrich von Stein (II)	1891	Summer	Faculty of Philosophy	born in Rostock
841	Otto Wilhelm Madelung	1892	Summer	Faculty of Medicine	
842	Ludwig Schulze	1893	Summer	Faculty of Theology	
843	Bernhard Matthiaß	1894	Summer	Faculty of Law	
844	Gustav Körte	1895	Summer	Faculty of Philosophy	
845	Wilhelm Stieda	1896	Summer	Faculty of Philosophy	
846	Rudolf Berlin	1897	Summer	Faculty of Medicine	verst. on 12.09.1897
847	Paul Falkenberg (I)	1897	Winter	Faculty of Philosophy	
848	Paul Falkenberg (II)	1898	Summer	Faculty of Philosophy	
849	Franz Bernhöft	1899	Summer	Faculty of Law	

== 20th century ==
=== 1900–1994 ===
No	Name	Year	Semester	Faculty	Note
850	Oscar Langendorff	1900	Summer	Faculty of Medicine	born in Breslau
851	Otto Staude (I)	1901	Summer	Faculty of Philosophy	born in Limbach (Sachsen)
852	Dietrich Barfurth (I)	1902	Summer	Faculty of Medicine	
853	Eugen Geinitz	1903	Summer	Faculty of Philosophy	born in Dresden
854	Karl Lehmann (Jurist)	1904	Summer	Faculty of Law	
855	August Michaelis	1905	Summer	Faculty of Philosophy	born in Bierbergen
856	Rudolf Kobert	1906	Summer	Faculty of Medicine	born in Bitterfeld
857	Wilhelm Walther (Theologe)	1907	Summer	Faculty of Theology	
858	Fedor Schuchardt	1908	Summer	Faculty of Medicine	
859	Wolfgang Golther	1909	Summer	Faculty of Philosophy	
860	Friedrich Martius	1910	Summer	Faculty of Medicine	
861	Franz Erhardt	1911	Summer	Faculty of Philosophy	
862	Rudolf Hübner	1912/13	Winter	Faculty of Law	Election in 1912 and took office in 1913
863	Otto Körner	1913/14	Winter	Faculty of Medicine	Election in 1913 and took office in 1914
864	Alfred Seeberg	1914	Summer	Faculty of Theology	
865	Hermann Reincke Bloch	1914	Winter	Faculty of Philosophy	
866	Albert Peters	1915	Summer	Faculty of Medicine	
867	Johannes Geffcken (Philologe) (I)	1916	Summer	Faculty of Philosophy	
868	Dietrich Barfurth (II)	1917	Summer	Faculty of Medicine	
869	Otto Staude (II)	1918	Summer	Faculty of Philosophy	
870	Gustav Herbig (Sprachwissenschaftler)	1919	Summer	Faculty of Philosophy	CPR
871	Rudolf Helm (I)	1920	Summer	Faculty of Philosophy	CPR
872	Rudolf Helm (II)	1921	Summer	Faculty of Philosophy	CPR
873	Hans Walsmann (I)	1922	Summer	Faculty of Law	CPR
874	Max Rosenfeld	1923	Summer	Faculty of Medicine	CPR
875	Johannes Geffcken (Philologe) (II)	1924	Summer	Faculty of Philosophy	CPR
876	Johannes von Walter	1925	Summer	Faculty of Theology	CPR
877	Walther Fischer (Mediziner)	1926	Summer	Faculty of Medicine	CPR
878	Walter Frieboes	1927	Summer	Faculty of Medicine	CPR
879	Franz Honcamp (I)	1928	Summer	Faculty of Philosophy	CPR
880	Paul Gieseke	1929	Summer	Faculty of Law	CPR
881	Franz Honcamp (II)	1929	Winter	Faculty of Philosophy	CPR
882	Friedrich Brunstäd	1930	Summer	Faculty of Theology	CPR
883	Curt Elze	1931	Summer	Faculty of Medicine	CPR
884	Kurt Poppe	1932	Winter	Faculty of Medicine	CPR
885	Paul Schulze (Zoologe) (I)	1933	Summer	Faculty of Philosophy	CPR
886	Paul Schulze (Zoologe) (II)	1934	Winter	Faculty of Philosophy	CPR
887	Ernst Heinrich Brill	1936	Summer	Faculty of Medicine	CPR
888	Ernst Ruickoldt	1937	Winter	Faculty of Medicine	CPR
889	Otto Steurer	1941	Summer	Faculty of Medicine	CPR
890	Kurt Wachholder	1944	Summer	Faculty of Medicine	CPR

Restructuring of the University of Rostock

891	Günther Rienäcker	1946	Winter	Faculty of Philosophy	CPR
892	Hans Hermann Schmid	1948	Winter	Faculty of Medicine	CPR
893	Ernst Struck	1949	Winter	Faculty of Education	CPR
894	Erich Schlesinger	1952	Winter	Faculty of Law	verst. on 17. Dez. 1956; CPR
895	Fritz Ernst Müller	1956	Winter	Faculty of Philosophy	CPR
896	Ernst Reinmuth	1957	Summer	Faculty of Agriculture	CPR
897	Rudolph Schick	1959	Summer	Faculty of Agriculture	CPR
898	Günter Heidorn	1965	Winter	Faculty of Philosophy	CPR
899	Wolfgang Brauer	1976	Winter	Faculty of Philosophy	CPR
900	Klaus Plötner	1989	Winter	Faculty of Agriculture	CPR
901	Gerhard Maeß (I)	1990	Summer	Faculty of Mathematics and Natural Sciences	CPR

=== 1994–1999 ===
With the State Higher Education Act of 9 February 1994, a 4-year term Rector was introduced.

No	Name	Year	Semester	Faculty	Note
902	Gerhard Maeß (II)	1994	Summer	Faculty of Mathematics and Natural Sciences	CPR
903	Günther Wildenhain	1998	Summer	Faculty of Mathematics and Natural Sciences	CPR

== 21st century ==
=== Since 2000 ===
No	Name	Year	Semester	Faculty	Note
904	Hans Jürgen Wendel	2002	Summer	Faculty of Philosophy	CPR
905	Thomas Strothotte	2006	Summer	Faculty of Computer Science and Electrical Engineering	CPR
906	Wolfgang Schareck	2009	Winter	Faculty of Medicine	CPR

== Literature ==
- Angela Hartwig, Tilmann Schmidt (eds): The Rectors of the University of Rostock - 1419-2000. In: Contributions to the History of the University of Rostock. Issue 23 University Press Rostock University Archives 2000. ISBN 3-86009-173-5.
