= Hermann Karsten =

Hermann Karsten may refer to:

- Gustav Karl Wilhelm Hermann Karsten (1817–1908), German botanist and geologist
- Hermann Karsten (physicist) (1809–1877), German physicist and mineralogist
