= Thinouia scandens =

Scientific classification
- Kingdom: Plantae
- Clade: Tracheophytes
- Clade: Angiosperms
- Clade: Eudicots
- Clade: Rosids
- Order: Sapindales
- Family: Sapindaceae
- Genus: Thinouia
- Species: T. scandens

Binomial name
- Thinouia scandens (Cambess.) Triana & Planch.

Synonyms
- Thouinia scandens Cambess.; Carpidopterix macroptera (Casar.) H.Karst.; Paullinia caudata Vell.; Paullinia racemosa Vell.; Thouinia macroptera Casar.

Species of flowering plant

Thinouia scandens is a liana belonging to the soapberry family (Sapindaceae). According to Eames and MacDaniels, this liana's shoots divide lengthwise into two or more strands like a multistranded rope.
