= Karl Johann Bernhard Karsten =

German mineralogist (1782–1853)

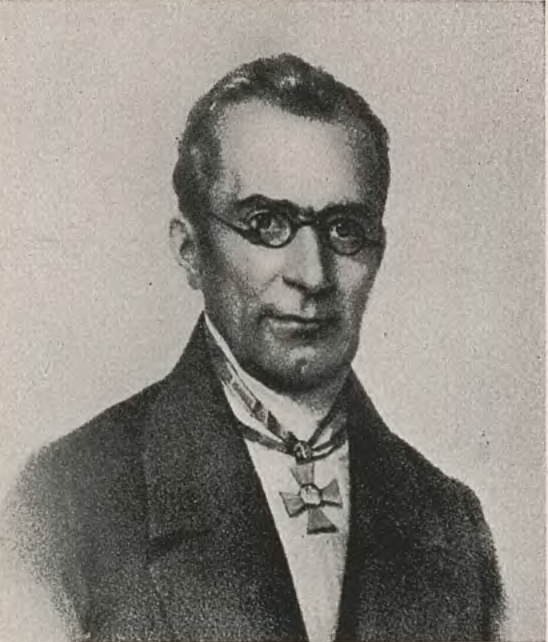
Carl Johann Bernhard Karsten

Karl Johann Bernhard Karsten (26 November 1782 – 22 August 1853) was a German mineralogist known for contributions made to the German metallurgy industry.

== Biography ==
Karsten was born at Bützow in Mecklenburg-Schwerin and initially studied law in Rostock. From 1801 he devoted his time to mining and metallurgy. In 1819 he was named mining councilor to the Ministry of the Interior in Berlin. He was a major factor in the emergence of the zinc industry in Silesia.

He was author of several comprehensive works, including:

- Handbuch der Eisenhüttenkunde (2 volumes, 1816; 3rd edition, 1841).
- System der Metallurgie, geschichtlich, statistisch, theoretisch und technisch (5 volumes, with atlas, 1831–1832).
- Lehrbuch der Salinenkunde (2 volumes, 1846–1847).

Karsten was well known as editor of the Archiv für Bergbau und Hüttenwesen (Archive for mining and metallurgy; 20 volumes, 1818–1831); and (with Ernst Heinrich Karl von Dechen) of the Archiv für Mineralogie, Geognosie, Bergbau und Hüttenkunde (26 volumes, 1829–1854).

He died at Berlin in 1853. His son, Dr. Hermann Karsten (1809–1877), was a professor of mathematics and physics at the University of Rostock.
