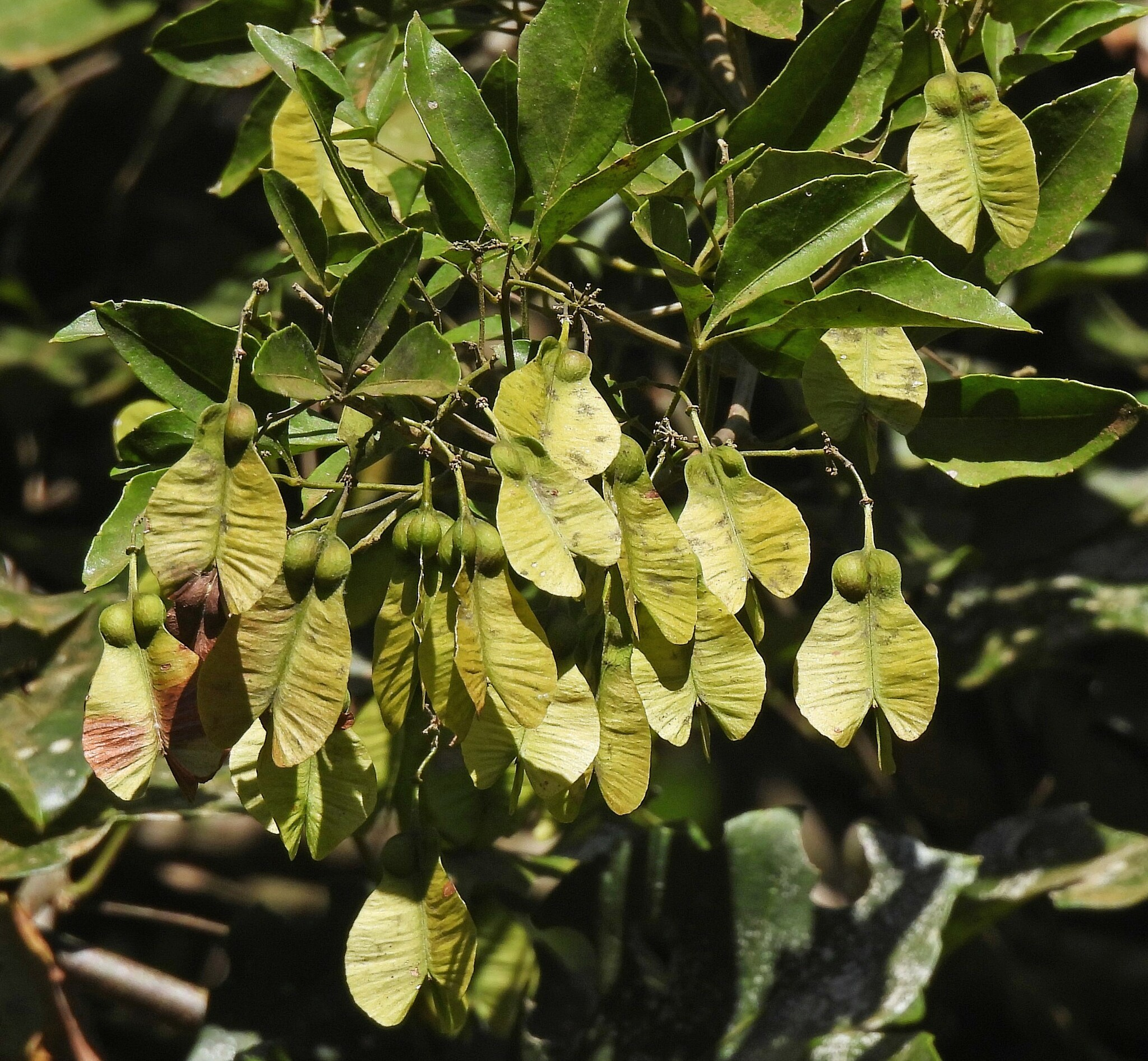
- Thinouia mucronata

Scientific classification
- Kingdom: Plantae
- Clade: Tracheophytes
- Clade: Angiosperms
- Clade: Eudicots
- Clade: Rosids
- Order: Sapindales
- Family: Sapindaceae
- Subfamily: Sapindoideae
- Genus: Thinouia; Planch. & Triana

= Thinouia =

Genus of flowering plants

Thinouia is a genus of flowering plants belonging to the family Sapindaceae. It is also in the Sapindoideae subfamily and Paullinieae tribe.

Its native range is parts of Central America (within Belize, Costa Rica, El Salvador, Guatemala, Honduras, Mexico and Panamá) and South America (within (northern) Argentina, Bolivia, Brazil, Colombia, Ecuador, French Guiana, Guyana, Paraguay, Peru and Venezuela).

The genus name of Thinouia is in honour of André Thouin (1747–1824), a French botanist. It was first described and published by George Bentham in London J. Bot. Vol.4 on page 633 in 1845.

== Known species ==
According to Kew:

- Thinouia cazumbensis H.Medeiros
- Thinouia compressa Radlk.
- Thinouia mucronata Radlk.
- Thinouia myriantha Triana & Planch.
- Thinouia obliqua Radlk.
- Thinouia paraguaiensis (Britton) Radlk.
- Thinouia restingae Ferrucci & Somner
- Thinouia scandens (Cambess.) Triana & Planch.
- Thinouia ternata Radlk.
- Thinouia tomocarpa Standl.
- Thinouia trifoliolata (Radlk.) Acev.-Rodr. & Ferrucci
- Thinouia ventricosa Radlk.
