= Hermann Karsten (physicist) =

German physicist and mineralogist

Hermann Karsten (3 September 1809 in Breslau – 26 August 1877 in Reinerz) was a German physicist and mineralogist. He was the son of mineralogist Karl Johann Bernhard Karsten (1782–1853) and a cousin to botanist Gustav Karl Wilhelm Hermann Karsten (1817–1908).

He initially studied law at the University of Bonn, then switched to mathematics and sciences, receiving his doctorate from the University of Berlin with the dissertation De crystallographiae mathematicae problematibus nonnullis (1829). Afterwards, he continued his education at the Königsberg Observatory as a student of astronomer Friedrich Wilhelm Bessel. In 1830 he obtained his habilitation in mathematics and mineralogy from the University of Rostock, where in 1836 he became a full professor of mathematics. At Rostock he gave lectures in astronomy, physics and mineralogy as well as classes on mathematical subjects.

On four occasions he served as rector at the university. In 1854 he was appointed director of the Rostock navigation school. Among his numerous published works was an astronomical almanac for seafarers.

== Selected works ==
- Ueber das Vorkommen des Bernsteins an der preußischen Küste, 1830 – On the occurrence of amber on the Prussian coast.
- Verzeichniß der im Rostocker Museum enthaltenen Versteinerungen der Tertiärformation, 1849 – Directory of the Rostock Museum / Fossils of the Tertiary formation.
- Verzeichniß der im Rostocker academischen Museum befindlichen Versteinerungen aus dem Sternberger Gestein, 1850 – Directory of the Rostock Museum / Fossils from the Sternberg rock.
- Lehrbuch der Krystallographie, 1864 – Textbook of crystallography.
- Zur Geschichte der naturhistorischen Sammlungen der Rostocker Universität, 1874 – History of natural history collections at the University of Rostock.

== See also ==
- List of rectors of University of Rostock
