= Rudolf Friedrich Weinland =

German pharmaceutical chemist (1856–1936)

Rudolf Heinrich Friedrich Weinland (22 November 1865, in Hohenwittlingen – 9 August 1936, in Münster) was a German pharmaceutical chemist. He was the son of zoologist David Friedrich Weinland (1829–1915).

From 1887, Weinland studied at the Technische Hochschule Stuttgart and at the University of Erlangen, receiving his doctorate from the latter institution in 1891. From 1892, he worked as an assistant to Albert Hilger in the chemistry laboratory at the Ludwig-Maximilians-Universität München, where in 1899 he obtained his habilitation for pharmaceutical chemistry. In 1902, he was named an associate professor at the University of Tübingen, then in 1920 relocated to the University of Würzburg as head of the department of pharmaceutical chemistry and the laboratory of applied chemistry.

== Selected works ==
- Über die Einwirkung der Oxyde, Hydroxyde von Beryllium, Magnesium, Zink, Cadmium und Quecksilber auf Metallsalze verschiedener Zusammensetzung, 1892 – On the action of oxides, hydroxides of beryllium, magnesium, zinc, cadmium and mercury in metal salts of different composition.
- Anleitung für das Praktikum in der Gewichtsanalyse, 1913.
- Darstellung anorganischer Präparate zur Einführung in die präparative anorganische Chemie, (with Christian Beck, 1913) – Representative inorganic preparations as an introduction to preparative inorganic chemistry.
- Einführung in die Chemie der Komplex-Verbindungen (Wernersche Koordinationslehre) in elementarer Darstellung (2nd edition, 1924) – Introduction to the chemistry of complex compounds (Werner's coordination chemistry) in elementary representation.
