= Otto Hahn (petrologist) =

German petrologist and lawyer

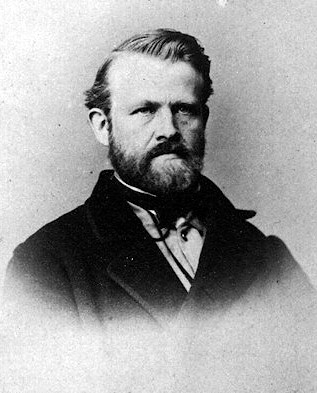
Picture of Otto Hahn (1828 - 1904)

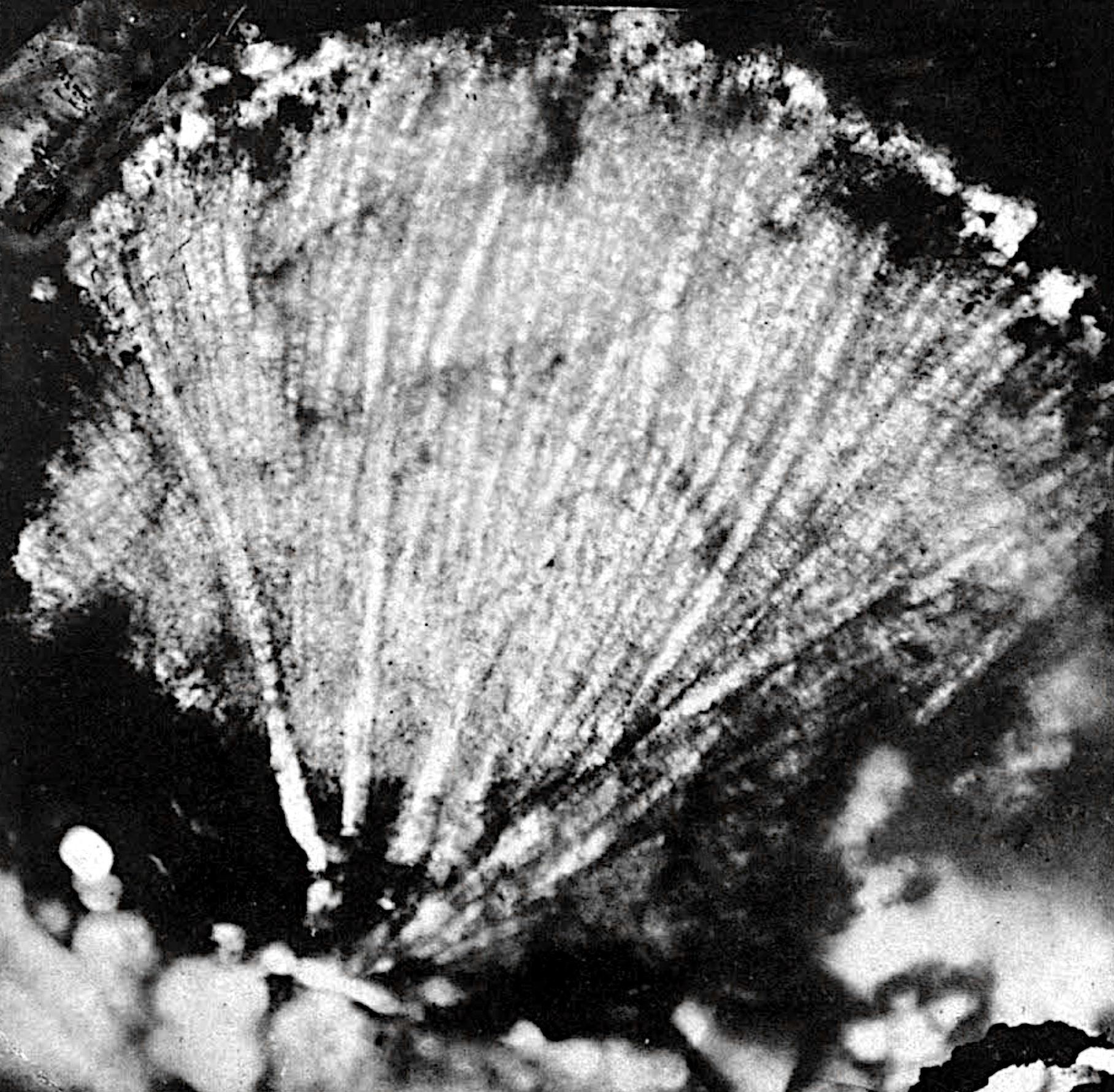
Cover Photo, Die Meteorite (Chondrite) und ihre Organismen, Table 22 Figure 3

Otto Hahn (1828 – 1904) was a German petrologist, geologist, lawyer and author. His father was Johann Franz Gottlieb Hahn (1789 – 1844). His great-grandfather was Christian Tobias Hahn (1759 – 1837), who was the half-brother of Philipp Matthäus Hahn.

Hahn started his career as a lawyer. He eventually left the legal profession for the natural sciences. The University of Tübingen awarded him a doctorate for his participation in the Eozoön canadense controversy. He was an active member of The New Church (Swedenborgian) and was a Neptunist. He published Die Urzelle in 1879. His book Die Meteorite (Chondrite) und ihre Organismen, published the following year in 1880, was a major work in the field of meteoritics that included 142 black and white photomicrographs of chondrite thin sections. In this latter work Hahn proposed the theory that the chondrites consist entirely of fossilized organic remains of life-forms, namely, fossilized sponges, corals, and crinoids. In addition, he claimed that the iron meteorites have an organic origin and that they are the petrified remains of a fungus or plant that was permeated with iron-nickel alloys, e.g. similar to ichnotaxa like the Chondrites.

== Selected works ==
- Recht und Licht: das Gottleben in der Natur und im Menschen rhythmisch dargestellt, 1861 – Law and light: the life of God in Nature and Rhythmically represented in Man
- Religion im Recht eine auf die Seelenlehre gebaute Untersuchung des Rechts, 1862 – Religion in Law is a Study of the Law Built on the Doctrine of the Soul
- Amerika: der Bauer und Arbeiter in Schwaben und in Amerika, 1866 – America: the Farmers and Workers in Swabia and America
- Das Handelsrecht nach dem allgemeinen deutschen Handelsgesetzbuch: nebst Anhang über das französische Recht und das Seerecht, 1871 – Commercial Law According to the General German Commercial Code: Together with an Appendix on French and Maritime Law
- Canada: meine Reise an den Nipissing (Ontario) und die Schweizercolonie, 1878 – Canada: My Trip to Nipissing (Ontario) and the Swiss Colony
- Die Urzelle: Nebst dem Beweis, dass Granit, Gneiss, Serpetin, Talk, gewisse Sandsteine, auch Basalt, endlich Meteorstein und Meteoreisen aus Pflanzen bestehen: Die Entwicklungslehre durch Thatsachen neu begründet , 1879 – The Primordial Cell: In Addition to the Proof that Granite, Gneiss, Serpentine, Talc, certain Sandstones, including Basalt, finally Meteorite and Meteoric Iron Consists of Plants: The Development of Theory Newly Established by Facts.
- Die Meteorite (Chondrite) und ihre Organismen, 1880 – The Meteorite (Chondrite) and its Organisms.
- Die Noth unserer Bauern und ihre Ursachen, 1880 – The Hardship of our Peasants and their Causes.
- Das Recht auf Arbeit: staatsrechtlich und volkswirthschaftlich auf Grund der Kaiserlich Botschaft vom 17. Nov 1881 erörtert, 1885 – The Right to Work: Constitutionally and Economically Discussed on the Basis of the Imperial Message of Nov 17, 1881.
- Voltaire am Hofe Friedrichs II. Ein Schauspiel, 1882 – Voltaire at the Court of Frederick II. A Spectacle
- Canada Die Berichte der vier deutschen Delegirten über ihre Reise nach Canada im Herbst 1881, 1883 – Canada: Reports of Four German Delegates about their Trip to Canada in the Fall of 1881
- Der Weinbau in Reutlingen und seine Zukunft, 1886 – Viticulture in Reutlingen and its Future
- Die Philosophie des Bewußten : Grundzüge der Naturphilosophie der Gegenwart unter Berücksichtigung der Kirchenlehren Dargestellt, 1887 – The Philosophy of the Conscious: Principles of the Natural Philosophy of the Present, Taking into Account the Doctrines of the Church
- Perpetua: Ein Trauerspiel aus der Zeit der ersten Christen, 1888 – Perpetua: A Tragedy from the Time of the First Christians.

== See also ==
- David Friedrich Weinland
- Wilhelm von Gümbel
- Gustav Karl Wilhelm Hermann Karsten
- Friedrich August von Quenstedt
- Anton Rzehak
- Carl Vogt
