= David Friedrich Weinland =

German zoologist, theologian and writer (1829–1915)

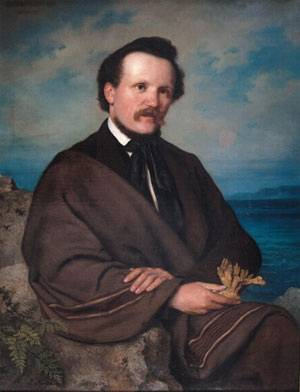
Portrait of David Friedrich Weinland

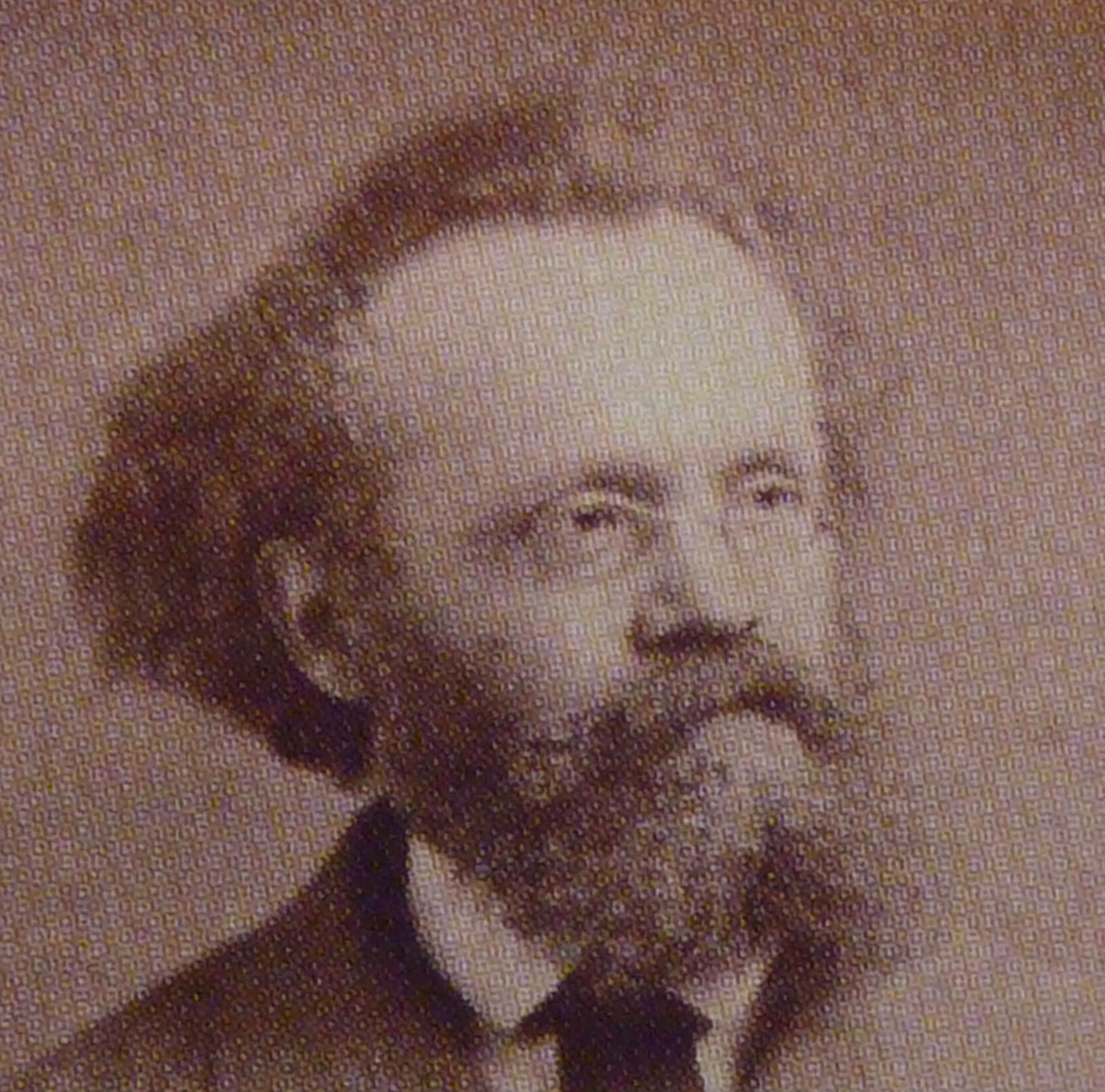
David Friedrich Weinland, Photograph by Erwin Hanfstaengl, 1880

David Friedrich Weinland (30 August 1829 in Grabenstetten – 19 September 1915 in Hohenwittlingen) was a German zoologist and novelist.

The son of a pastor, Weinland attended the Protestant Seminary in Maulbronn from 1843 to 1847. He studied theology at the University of Tübingen 1847–51, followed by two semester of studying natural sciences. He earned his PhD in 1852. then worked as an assistant at the Zoological Museum in Berlin. From 1855 he conducted scientific investigations in Canada, Mexico and the Caribbean (especially Haiti) and worked for three years in Louis Agassiz's microscopical laboratory at Harvard University.

In 1859 he returned to Germany as director of the Frankfurt Zoological Garden; in this capacity he edited the journal "Der Zoologische Garten". and contributed significantly to the enthusiasm for founding zoos, which spread among the middle classes.

Following the publication of Otto Hahn's 1880 work, Die Meteorite (Chondrite) und ihre Organismen, Weinland publicly supported Hahn's theory regarding the chondrites. In 1881 Weinland, writing in the popular geographical journal Das Ausland, asserted the correctness of Hahn's attempt to classify the inclusions of the chondrites as organic, although slightly modifying Hahn's original assignment of the genera, by stating that the chondrites are in fact nothing but fossiliferous rocks, i.e. the petrified remains of life-forms. He published in 1882 a treatise entitled Ueber die in Meteoriten entdeckten Thiereste in which he established sixteen new genera, each with multiple species.

Weinland's novel Rulaman of 1878 became a bestseller of youth literature in Germany, with half a million copies sold until today.

He was the father of chemist Rudolf Friedrich Weinland (1865–1936).

== Eponymy ==
- Eleutherodactylus weinlandi, Weinland's robber frog; circumscribed by Thomas Barbour in 1914.
- Gastrotheca weinlandii, Weinland's marsupial frog; circumscribed by Franz Steindachner in 1892.
- Celestus weinlandi Cope 1868, currently Comptus stenurus weinlandi.

== Selected works ==
- Ueber den Beutelfrosch, 1854 – About the marsupial frog.
- "On the egg-tooth of snakes and lizards", (published in English in 1857).
- "Human cestoides: An essay on the tapeworms of man", (published in English in 1858).
- Zur Weichthierfauna der Schwäbischen Alb, 1876 – Mollusks of the Swabian Alb.
- Rulaman: Erzählung aus der Zeit des Höhlenmenschen und des Höhlenbären, 1878 (published over numerous editions) Rulaman, a story from the time of cavemen and cave bears (fiction).
- Kuning Hartfest: Ein Lebensbild aus der Geschichte unserer deutschen Ahnen, 1879 – Kuning Hartfest; a biography on the history of our German ancestors
- Über die in Meteoriten entdeckten Tierreste, 1882 – About the Animal Remains Discovered in the Meteorites.
