= Gustav Karl Wilhelm Hermann Karsten =

German botanist and geologist

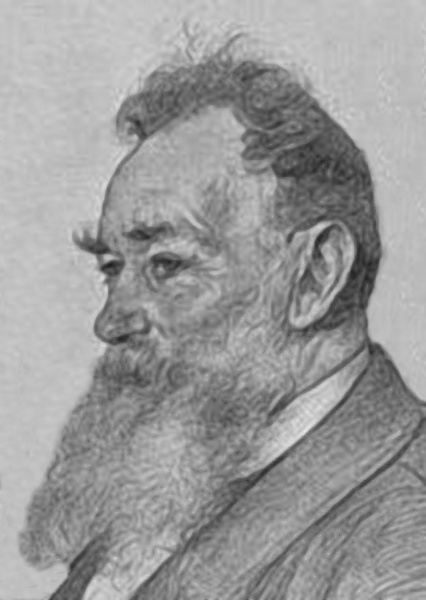
- Hermann Karsten, 1894
- Born: 6 November 1817; Stralsund, Germany
- Died: 10 July 1908 (aged 90); Zoppot, Germany; now Sopot, Poland
- Known for: Naming many botanical species
- Relatives: Hermann Karsten, Gustav Karsten (cousins).
- Scientific career
- Fields: Botany, geology
- Institutions: University of Vienna
- Author abbrev. (botany): H.Karst.

Gustav Karl Wilhelm Hermann Karsten (6 November 1817, in Stralsund – 10 July 1908, in Zoppot) was a German botanist and geologist.

== Biography ==
Born in Stralsund, he followed the example of Alexander von Humboldt and traveled 1844-56 the northern part of South America (Venezuela, Ecuador and Colombia). From 1856 to 1868, he was a professor at the agricultural college in Berlin, afterwards serving as a professor of plant physiology at the University of Vienna (1868–72). In 1881, at the suggestion of David Friedrich Weinland, Karsten became convinced of the correctness of Otto Hahn's organic theory of the chondrites and, as a result, wrote an essay entitled "Die Meteorite und ihre Organismen" in which he declared his support for Hahn's theory.

As a taxonomist, he was the binomial author of many botanical species.

== Selected bibliography ==
- Florae Columbiae ... 1859–1869. (Vol. 1: Digital edition / Vol. 2: Digital edition by the University and State Library Düsseldorf)
- Chemismus der Pflanzenzelle 1869.
- Deutsche Flora. Pharmaceutisch-medicinische Botanik 1880-1883; second edition 1894–1895.
- "Hermann Karsten (1851) y Wilhelm Sievers (1888): las primeras descripciones e interpretaciones sobre el órigen de las terrazas aluviales en la Córdillera de Mérida." C. Schubert. Bol. Hist. Geocien. Venez., 44, pp 15–19
- "Die Meteorite und ihre Organismen", 1881 - The Meteorite and its Organisms.
