= Johann Cothmann =

German jurist and diplomat

Johann Cothmann (1588 in Lemgo - 1661, Güstrow) was a jurist and diplomat in the Holy Roman Empire. His brother, Ernst Cothmann, was the Chancellor of Mecklenburg. He was also a member of the Fruitbearing Society, a German literary society.
