= Dietrich Barfurth =

German anatomist and embryologist

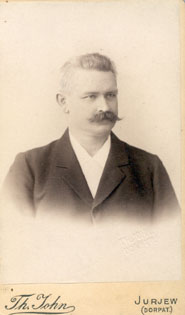
Dietrich Barfurth (1849-1927

Karl Dietrich Gerhard Barfurth (25 January 1849 – 23 March 1927) was a German anatomist and embryologist born in Dinslaken.

He studied mathematics and sciences at the University of Göttingen, and medicine (1879–1882) at the University of Bonn. In 1882 he earned his medical doctorate, and in 1883 received his habilitation in anatomy. In 1888 he worked as prosector under Friedrich Sigmund Merkel (1845–1919) in Göttingen. From 1889 to 1896 he was a professor of anatomy, embryology and histology at the Imperial University of Dorpat, and afterwards was professor of anatomy at the University of Rostock as well as director of the institute of anatomy.

Barfurth is remembered for regeneration research of body parts (tissues, limbs, organs, etc.) in animals at the embryonic, larval and adult stages of life. He was the author of the following works on regeneration:

- Regeneration und Transplantation (1917)
- Methoden zur Erforschung der Regeneration bei Tieren (Methods for the Study of Regeneration in Animals) (1920)
