= Eilhard Lubinus =

German theologian, philosopher, critic, scholar, linguist, mathematician and cartographer

Eilhard Lubinus (23 March 1565 – 2 June 1621) was a German Lutheran theologian and philosopher, also known as a social critic, classical scholar, linguist, mathematician and cartographer. He was an influence on Comenius and Leibniz.

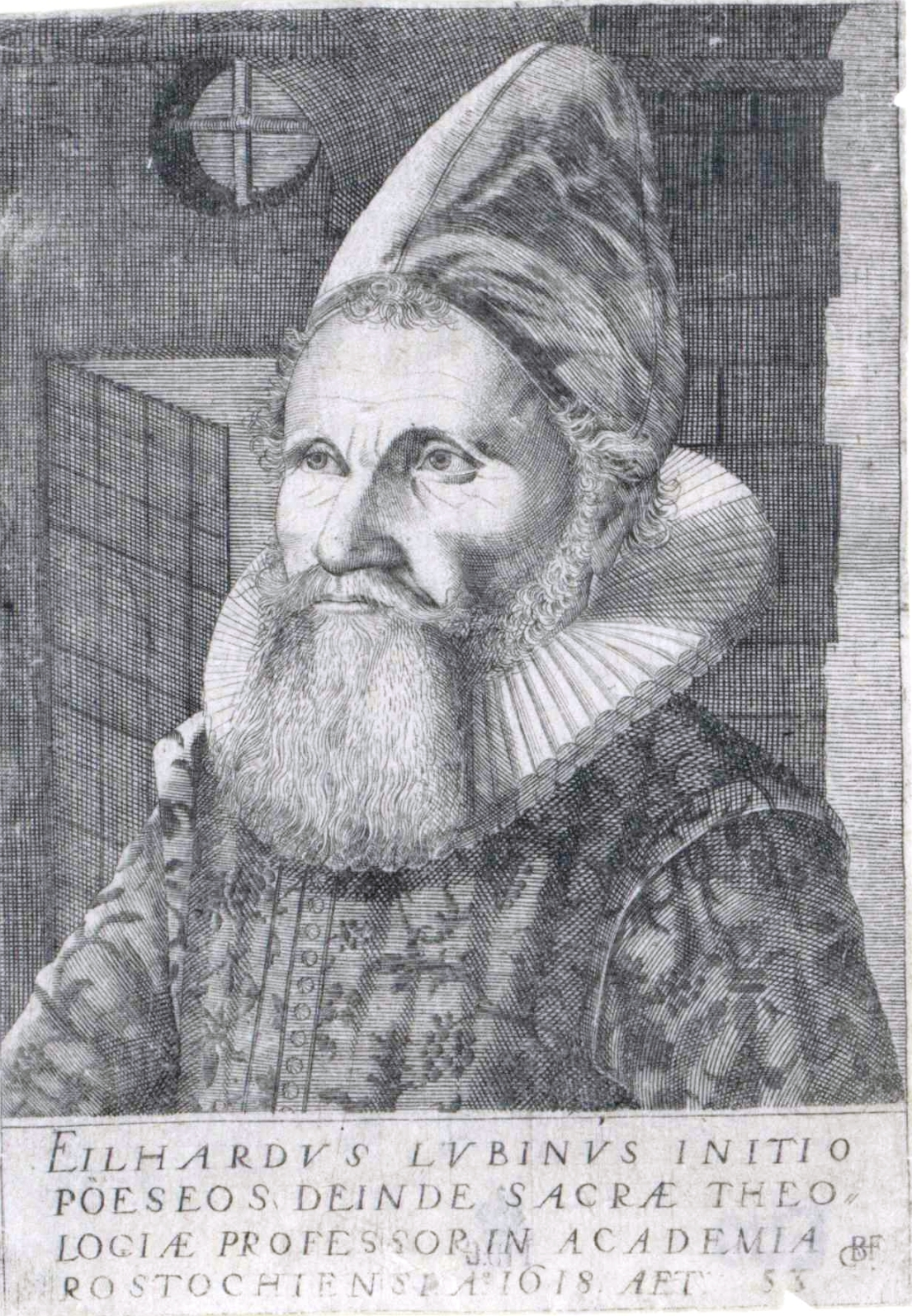
Eilhard Lubinus

== Life ==
His actual name is Eilhard Lübben. Born in Westerstede in 1565, Lubinus was son of a pastor in the Duchy of Oldenburg. He studied at Leipzig and other universities, and in 1595 became Professor of Poetry in the University of Rostock. In 1605 he transferred to the Chair of Theology there. Phillip II of Pomerania in 1610 commissioned him to make a map of Pomerania. He died in 1621 in Rostock.

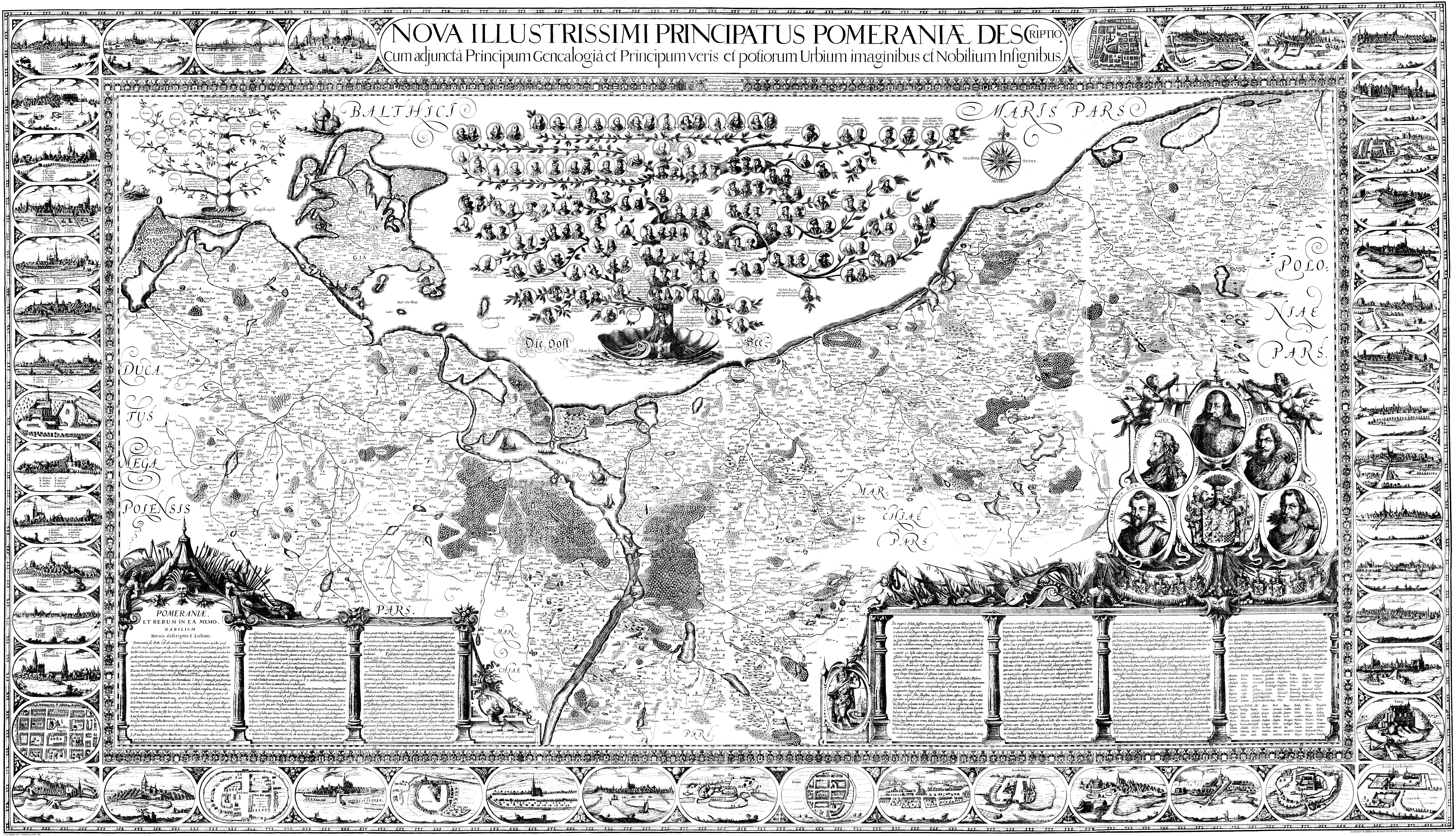
1618 map of Pomerania by Lubinus

== Works ==
Lubinus published works including editions of the Epistolae of Apollonius, the De Vanitate Mundi of Bernard, the Greek Anthology in a literal Latin version, and the Epistolae of Hippocrates.

In his Phosphorus, sive de prima causa et natura mali tractatus (Rostock 1596), he taught (following a neo-Platonist position) that there are two primordial principles, Being and Nothing. This position was considered heretical, and he was attacked for it by Albert Grauer and others.

He published a trilingual edition of the New Testament in 1617. With it as a Preface was a Discourse against the contemporary methods of teaching Latin; it advocated the use of pictures and techniques treating it as a living language. Comenius later acknowledged the influence of Lubinus on his own educational thinking. The Preface was published in English translation in 1654 by Samuel Hartlib as The True and Readie Way to Learne the Latin Tongue, together with an essay by Sir Richard Carew, 1st Baronet, and an extract from an essay by Michel de Montaigne.
