= Friedrich Brunstäd =

German theologian (1883–1944)

Friedrich Brunstäd (22 July 1883, Hanover – 2 November 1944, Willershagen) was a German Lutheran systematic theologian and philosopher. He attempted a renewal of German idealism, from the point of view of Lutheranism.

From 1901 he studied philosophy, theology, political science and history at the universities of Heidelberg and Berlin, receiving his doctorate in 1909 with the thesis Untersuchungen zu Hegels Geschichtstheorie (Studies on Hegel's theory of history). In 1911 he obtained his habilitation for philosophy at the University of Erlangen, where in 1918 he became an associate professor. In 1925 he was appointed as professor of systematic theology at the University of Rostock (academic rector in 1930/31).

From 1922 to 1934 he was head of the Evangelisch-Sozialen Schule (Evangelical Social School) at the Johannesstift in Berlin-Spandau.

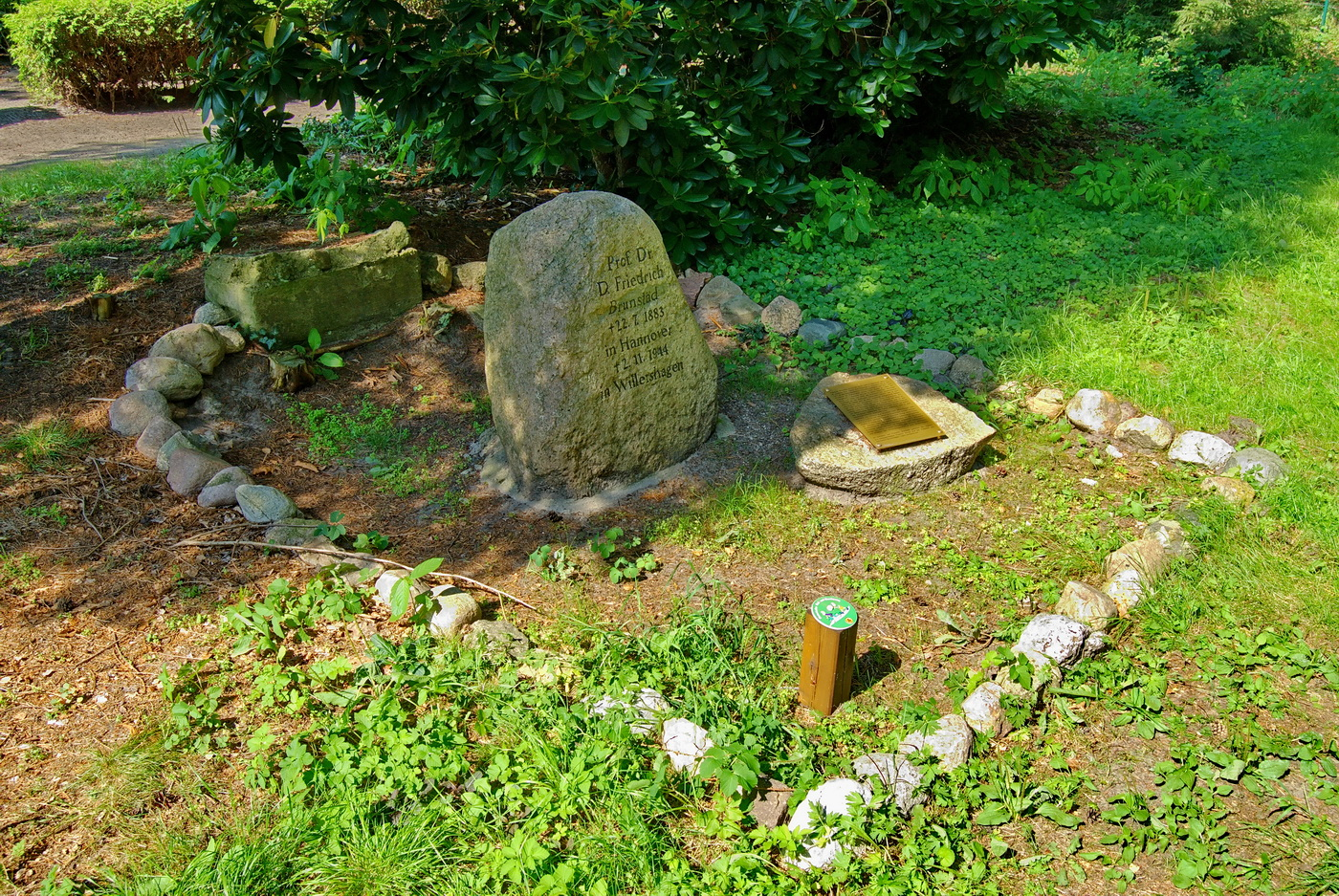
Gravesite of Friedrich Brunstäd at the cemetery in Gelbensande.

== Selected works ==
- Beiträge zum kritischen Erkenntnisbegriffe, 1911 (habilitation thesis) – Contributions to critical knowledge forms.
- Die Idee der Religion : Prinzipien der Religionsphilosophie, 1922 – The idea of religion: the principles of the philosophy of religion.
- Deutschland und der sozialismus, 1924 – Germany and socialism.
- Reformation und Idealismus, 1925 – The Reformation and idealism.
- Adolf Stoecker; Wille und Schicksal, 1935 – Adolf Stoecker; will and fate.
- Allgemeine Offenbarung : zum Streit um die "natürliche Theologie", 1935 – General revelation: the controversy over "natural theology".
- Theologie der lutherischen Bekenntnisschriften, 1951 – Theology of the Lutheran confessions.
