= List of plants of Pantanal vegetation of Brazil =

This is a list of plants found in the wild in Pantanal vegetation of Brazil.

== Aizoaceae ==
- Glinus radiatus Rohrb.

== Amaranthaceae ==
- Achyranthes aspera L.
- Amaranthus lividus ssp. polygonoides L.
- Froelichia procera (Seub.) Pedersen
- Gomphrena elegans var elegans Mart.
- Iresine macrophylla R.E.Fr.
- Pfaffia glomerata (Spreng.) Pedersen

== Amaryllidaceae ==
- Alstroemeria cf. psittacina Lehm.
- Hippeastrum belladonna L.

== Anacardiaceae ==
- Anacardium humile A.St.-Hil.
- Astronium fraxinifolium Schott
- Myracrodruon urundeuva M.Allemão
- Schinopsis balansae Engl.
- Spondias lutea L.

== Annonaceae ==
- Annona coriacea Mart.
- Annona cornifolia A.St.-Hil.
- Annona dioica A.St.-Hil.
- Annona phaeoclados Mart.
- Duguetia furfuracea (A.St.-Hil.) Benth. et Hook.f.
- Rollinia emarginata Schltdl.
- Unonopsis lindmanii R.E.Fr.
- Xylopia aromatica Mart.

== Apocynaceae ==
- Aspidosperma parvifolium A.DC.
- Aspidosperma cylindrocarpon Müll.Arg.
- Aspidosperma quebracho-blanco Schicht.
- Aspidosperma tomentosum Mart.
- Bonafousia siphilitica (L.f.) L.Allorge
- Forsteronia pubescens A.DC.
- Hancornia speciosa Gomes
- Himatanthus obovatus (Müll.Arg.) Woodson
- Macrosiphonia petraea Kuntze
- Prestonia coalita (Vell.) Woodson
- Rhabdadenia pohlii Müll.Arg.
- Rhodocalyx rotundifolius Müll.Arg.
- Secondatia densiflora A.DC.
- Thevetia bicornuta Müll.Arg.

== Bignoniaceae ==
- Tabebuia roseo-alba (Ridl.) Sandwith
- Tabebuia ochracea (Cham.) Standl.
- Handroanthus heptaphyllus

== Clusiaceae ==
- Kielmeyera coriacea Mart. & Zucc.

== See also ==
- List of plants of Amazon Rainforest vegetation of Brazil
- List of plants of Atlantic Forest vegetation of Brazil
- List of plants of Caatinga vegetation of Brazil
- List of plants of Cerrado vegetation of Brazil
- Official list of endangered flora of Brazil
