= Peroba =

Peroba, paroba, parova, perobeira, perova and peroveira are common names for various tree species in the families:

- Apocynaceae
- Bignoniaceae

Species known by this name have important use in the timber industry, especially the species referred to as peroba rosa (Aspidosperma peroba).

Peroba is also applied to the following species:

- Peroba
- Peroba-açu
- Peroba-amarela
- Peroba-amarga
- Peroba-amargosa
- Peroba-branca
- Peroba-brava (Clethra laevigata)
- Peroba-café (Clethra laevigata)
- Peroba-cetim (Aspidosperma macrocarpon)
- Peroba-comum (Aspidosperma polyneuron)
- Peroba-d'água (Cestrum toledii)
- Peroba-de-campos (Aspidosperma tomentosum)
- Peroba-de-folha-larga (Aspidosperma cuspa)
- Peroba-de-goiás
- Peroba-de-gomo
- Peroba-de-lagoa-santa (Aspidosperma cylindrocarpon)
- Peroba-de-minas (Aspidosperma cylindrocarpon)
- Peroba-de-rego (Aspidosperma compactinervium)
- Peroba-de-santa-catarina (Aspidosperma parvifolium)
- Peroba-de-são-paulo
- Peroba-do-campo (Aspidosperma macrocarpon)
- Peroba-do-cerrado (Aspidosperma tomentosum)
- Peroba-do-rio
- Peroba-dos-campos (Aspidosperma tomentosum)
- Peroba-iquira (Aspidosperma cylindrocarpon)
- Peroba-manchada (Paratecoma peroba)
- Peroba-miúda
- Peroba-paulista
- Peroba-poca (Aspidosperma cylindrocarpon)
- Peroba-rosa
- Peroba-tabuada (Aspidosperma compactinervium)
- Peroba-tambu (Aspidosperma parvifolium)
- Peroba-tigrina (Paratecoma peroba)
- Peroba-tremida (Paratecoma peroba)
- Peroba-vermelha
