= Tabernaemontana albiflora =

Tabernaemontana albiflora can refer to:

- Tabernaemontana albiflora (Miq.) Pulle, an illegitimate name for Tabernaemontana peschiera
- Tabernaemontana albiflora Rojas Acosta, a legitimate synonym of Tabernaemontana catharinensis
