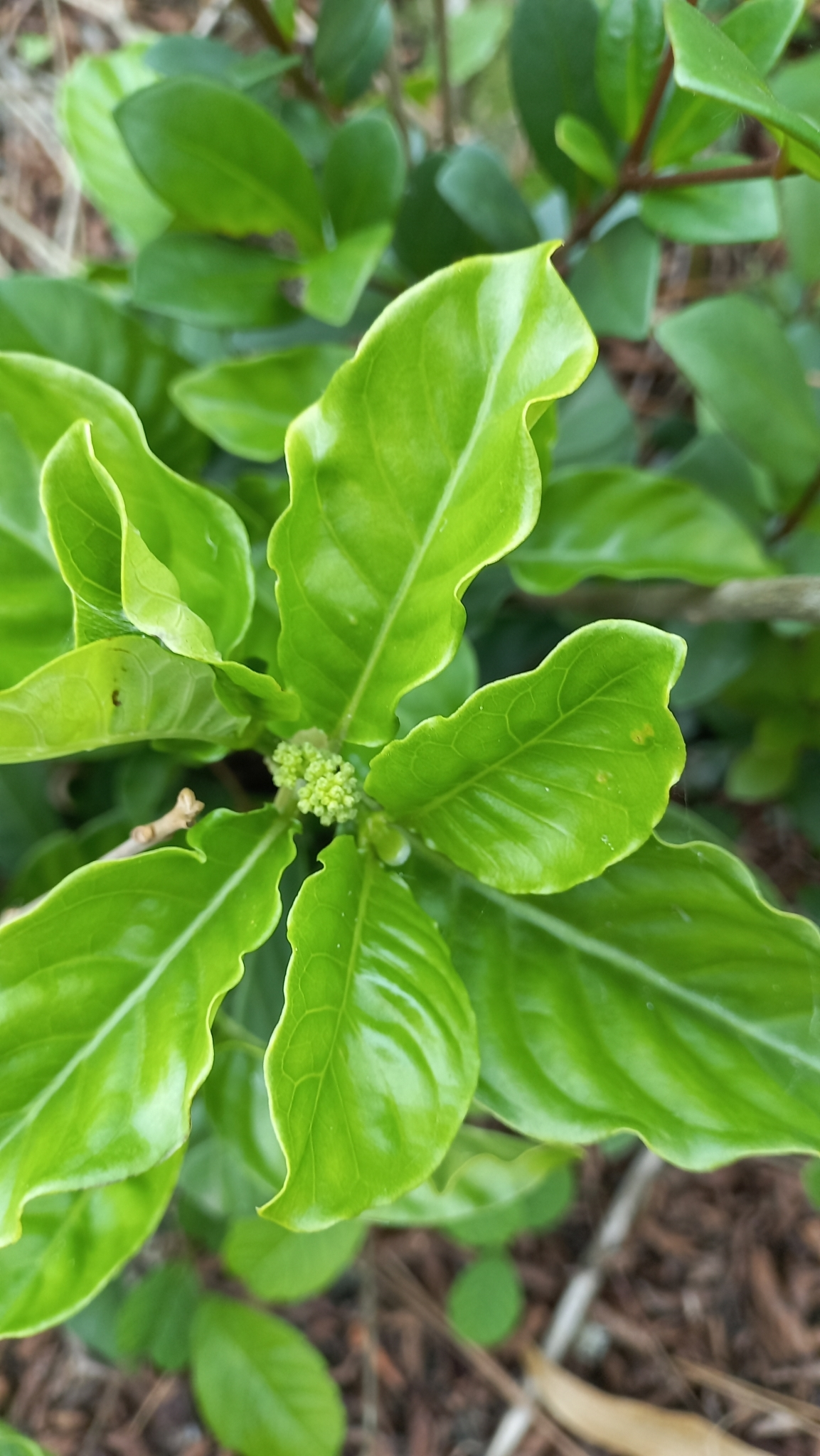
- Forsteronia leptocarpa

Scientific classification
- Kingdom: Plantae
- Clade: Tracheophytes
- Clade: Angiosperms
- Clade: Eudicots
- Clade: Asterids
- Order: Gentianales
- Family: Apocynaceae
- Subfamily: Apocynoideae
- Tribe: Mesechiteae
- Genus: Forsteronia; G.Mey.

Synonyms
- Anabata Willd. ex Roem. & Schult.; Aptotheca Miers; Syringosma Mart. ex Rchb.; Thyrsanthus Benth.

= Forsteronia =

Genus of plants

Forsteronia is a genus of plants in the family Apocynaceae, first described as a genus in 1818. It is native to South America, Central America, Mexico, and the West Indies.

Species

1. Forsteronia acouci (Aubl.) A.DC. - S Mexico to Peru
2. Forsteronia adenobasis Müll.Arg. - SE Venezuela, Guianas
3. Forsteronia affinis Müll.Arg. - NW South America
4. Forsteronia amazonica Monach. - NW Brazil
5. Forsteronia amblybasis S.F.Blake - Peru, Bolivia
6. Forsteronia apurensis Markgr. - Venezuela
7. Forsteronia australis Müll.Arg. - Brazil
8. Forsteronia brevifolia Markgr. - NW Brazil, NE Peru
9. Forsteronia chiriquensis Woodson - Panama, Colombia
10. Forsteronia cordata (Müll.Arg.) Woodson - SE Brazil
11. Forsteronia × correntina C.Ezcurra & Tressens - NE Argentina
12. Forsteronia diospyrifolia Müll.Arg. - SE Venezuela, Guyana
13. Forsteronia domatiella Proctor - Jamaica
14. Forsteronia duckei Markgr. - SE Colombia, Guyana, NW Brazil
15. Forsteronia elachista S.F.Blake - NE Colombia, NW Venezuela
16. Forsteronia glabrescens Müll.Arg. - S South America
17. Forsteronia gracilis (Benth.) Müll.Arg. - N South America
18. Forsteronia graciloides Woodson - Colombia, Peru
19. Forsteronia guyanensis Müll.Arg. - N South America
20. Forsteronia laurifolia (Benth.) A.DC. - Amazon Basin
21. Forsteronia leptocarpa (Hook. & Arn.) A.DC. - Brazil
22. Forsteronia linearis (Vell.) Müll.Arg. - SE Brazil
23. Forsteronia lucida Markgr. - Amazon Basin
24. Forsteronia manausana B.F.Hansen - Amazonas State in Brazil
25. Forsteronia mollis Rusby - Bolivia
26. Forsteronia montana Müll.Arg. - E Brazil
27. Forsteronia myriantha Donn.Sm. - S Mexico to Bolivia
28. Forsteronia nitida B.F.Hansen - E Brazil
29. Forsteronia obtusiloba Müll.Arg. - Venezuela, Suriname
30. Forsteronia paludosa Woodson - Pará, Mato Grosso
31. Forsteronia paraensis B.F.Hansen - Suriname, Pará
32. Forsteronia pilosa (Vell.) Müll.Arg. - E Brazil
33. Forsteronia prancei B.F.Hansen - Brazil (Roraima)
34. Forsteronia pubescens A.DC. - SC South America
35. Forsteronia pycnothyrsus K. Schum. ex Woodson - Ecuador
36. Forsteronia refracta Müll.Arg. - Venezuela to NE Argentina
37. Forsteronia rufa Müll.Arg. - Brazil
38. Forsteronia schomburgkii A.DC. - Guyana
39. Forsteronia simulans Woodson - Colombia
40. Forsteronia spicata (Jacq.) G.Mey. - Mexico to Venezuela, Cuba
41. Forsteronia subcordata K.Schum. ex Woodson - Ecuador, Peru
42. Forsteronia tarapotensis K.Schum. ex Woodson - Amazon Basin
43. Forsteronia thyrsoidea (Vell.) Müll.Arg. - SC South America
44. Forsteronia umbellata (Aubl.) Woodson - NE South America
45. Forsteronia vellozoana (A.DC.) Woodson - Brazil
46. Forsteronia wilsonii (Griseb.) Woodson - Jamaica

== Pinochia ==
Formerly included in Forsteronia but transferred to Pinochia in 2007:

- Forsteronia corymbosa (Jacq.) G.Mey. = Pinochia corymbosa (Jacq.) M.E.Endress & B.F.Hansen
- Forsteronia floribunda (Sw.) A.DC. = Pinochia floribunda (Sw.) M.E.Endress & B.F.Hansen
- Forsteronia monteverdensis J.F.Morales = Pinochia monteverdensis (J.F.Morales) M.E.Endress & B.F.Hansen
- Forsteronia peninsularis Woodson = Pinochia peninsularis (Woodson) M.E.Endress & B.F.Hansen
- Forsteronia portoricensis Woodson = Pinochia corymbosa subsp. portoricensis (Woodson) M.E.Endress & B.F.Hansen
