= Kopsanone =

Names
- IUPAC name 5,14-diazaheptacyclo[12.5.3.0^{1,13}.0^{4,12}.0^{4,18}.0^{6,11}.0_{12,16}]docosa-6,8,10-trien-17-one
- Other names Kopsan-22-one

Identifiers
CAS Number	6662-83-5
3D model (JSmol)	Interactive image
ChemSpider	383767
PubChem CID	433961
UNII	3GFZ578CMF
CompTox Dashboard (EPA)	DTXSID80330958
- InChI: InChI=1S/C20H22N2O/c23-16-13-10-18-6-3-9-22-11-14(16)20(17(18)22)12-4-1-2-5-15(12)21-19(13,20)8-7-18/h1-2,4-5,13-14,17,21H,3,6-11H2 Key: RFDVSXYPLPEIGZ-UHFFFAOYSA-N
- SMILES: C1CC23CCC45C(C2)C(=O)C6C4(C3N(C1)C6)C7=CC=CC=C7N5

Properties
Chemical formula	C_{20}H_{22}N_{2}O
Molar mass	306.409 g·mol^{−1}
- Except where otherwise noted, data are given for materials in their standard state (at 25 °C [77 °F], 100 kPa). Infobox references

Kopsanone is an alkaloid isolated from Aspidosperma.

== Extra reading ==
- Klein-Júnior, Lc; Bannwart, G; Kato, L; Oliveira, Cma; Gontijo, B; Silva, Cc; Ferreira, Hd; Vander Heyden, Y; Passos, Cs; Henriques, At; Santin, Smo (25 November 2015). "Kopsanone and N(4)-oxide-kopsanone: two β-carbolinic indole alkaloids with monoamine oxidase A inhibitory activity". Planta Medica. 81 (16): s–0035–1565743. doi:10.1055/s-0035-1565743.
- Craven, B. M. (1 October 1969). "The crystal structure and absolute configuration of the N ( b )-methiodide of (−)-kopsanone". Acta Crystallographica Section B: Structural Crystallography and Crystal Chemistry. 25 (10): 2131–2139. doi:10.1107/S0567740869005243.
- Leng, Lingying; Zhou, Xiaohan; Liao, Qi; Wang, Falu; Song, Hao; Zhang, Dan; Liu, Xiao-Yu; Qin, Yong (20 March 2017). "Asymmetric Total Syntheses of Kopsia Indole Alkaloids". Angewandte Chemie International Edition. 56 (13): 3703–3707. doi:10.1002/anie.201700831.
- Layne, Tanya H.; Roach, Joy S.; Tinto, Winston F. (January 2015). "Review of β-carboline Alkaloids from the Genus Aspidosperma". Natural Product Communications. 10 (1): 1934578X1501000. doi:10.1177/1934578X1501000139.
