= Aspidosperma triternatum =

Conservation status
- Near Threatened (IUCN 2.3)

Scientific classification
- Kingdom: Plantae
- Clade: Tracheophytes
- Clade: Angiosperms
- Clade: Eudicots
- Clade: Asterids
- Order: Gentianales
- Family: Apocynaceae
- Genus: Aspidosperma
- Species: A. triternatum

Binomial name
- Aspidosperma triternatum Rojas Acosta

Species of plant

Aspidosperma triternatum is a species of plant in the family Apocynaceae. It is found in Argentina and Paraguay.
