= Wheel tree =

Wheel tree is a common name for several plants and may refer to:

- Aspidosperma excelsum, a tree native to South America
- Trochodendron aralioides, a tree or large shrub native to eastern Asia
