= Aspidosperma darienense =

Conservation status
- Least Concern (IUCN 3.1)

Scientific classification
- Kingdom: Plantae
- Clade: Tracheophytes
- Clade: Angiosperms
- Clade: Eudicots
- Clade: Asterids
- Order: Gentianales
- Family: Apocynaceae
- Genus: Aspidosperma
- Species: A. darienense

Binomial name
- Aspidosperma darienense Woodson ex Dwyer

Species of plant

Aspidosperma darienense is a species of flowering plant in the family Apocynaceae. It is a tree native to Panama, Colombia, Ecuador, French Guiana, and northern Brazil. It is threatened by habitat loss.
