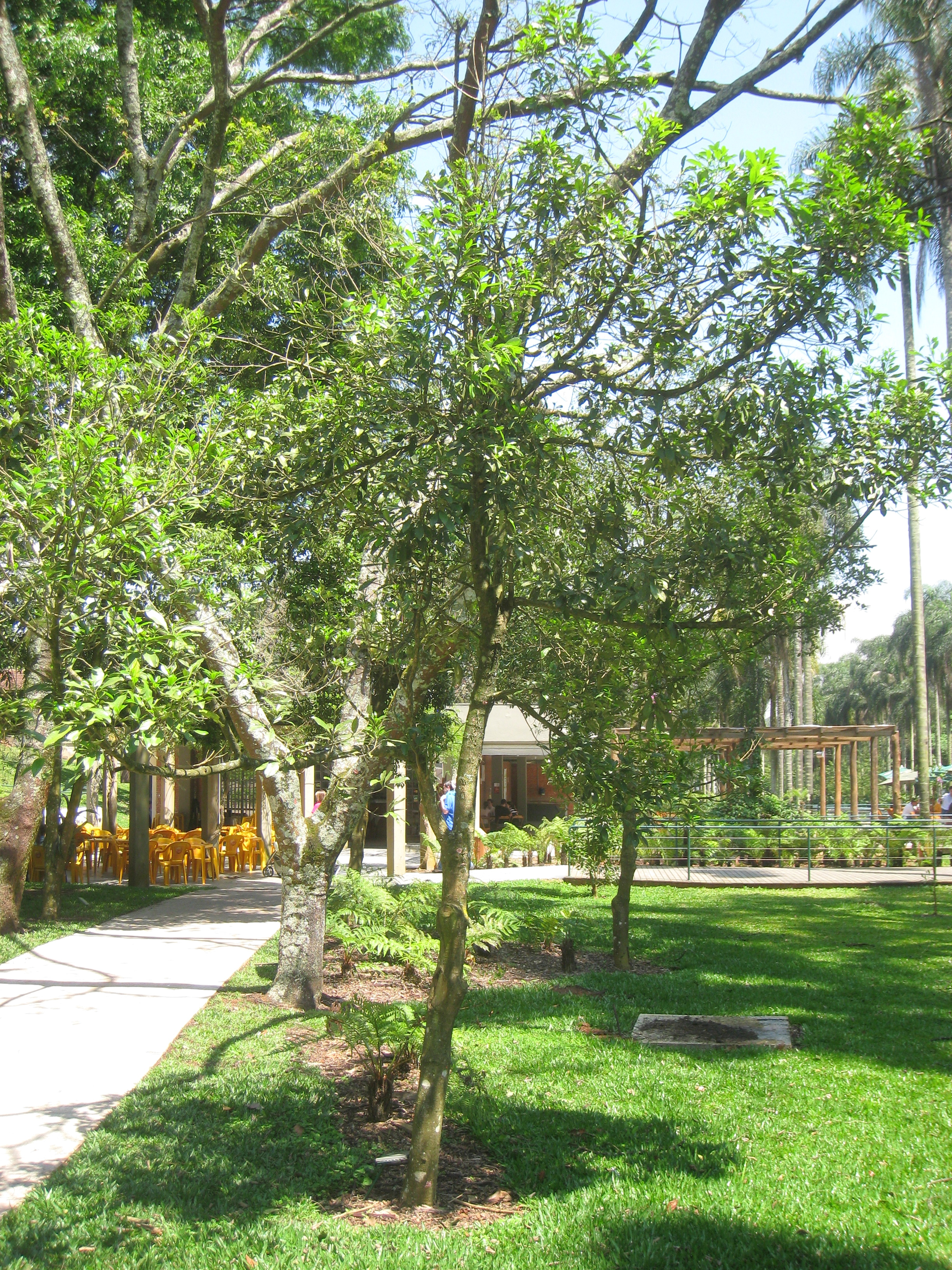

Conservation status
- Least Concern (IUCN 3.1)

Scientific classification
- Kingdom: Plantae
- Clade: Embryophytes
- Clade: Tracheophytes
- Clade: Spermatophytes
- Clade: Angiosperms
- Clade: Eudicots
- Clade: Asterids
- Order: Gentianales
- Family: Apocynaceae
- Genus: Aspidosperma
- Species: A. ulei

Binomial name
- Aspidosperma ulei Markgr.

Synonyms
- Aspidosperma occidentale Markgr. 1940 not Malme 1927

= Aspidosperma ulei =

Species of tree

Aspidosperma ulei is flowering plant in the family Apocynaceae. It is a timber tree native to North and Northeast Brazil, Guyana, Suriname, Venezuela.
