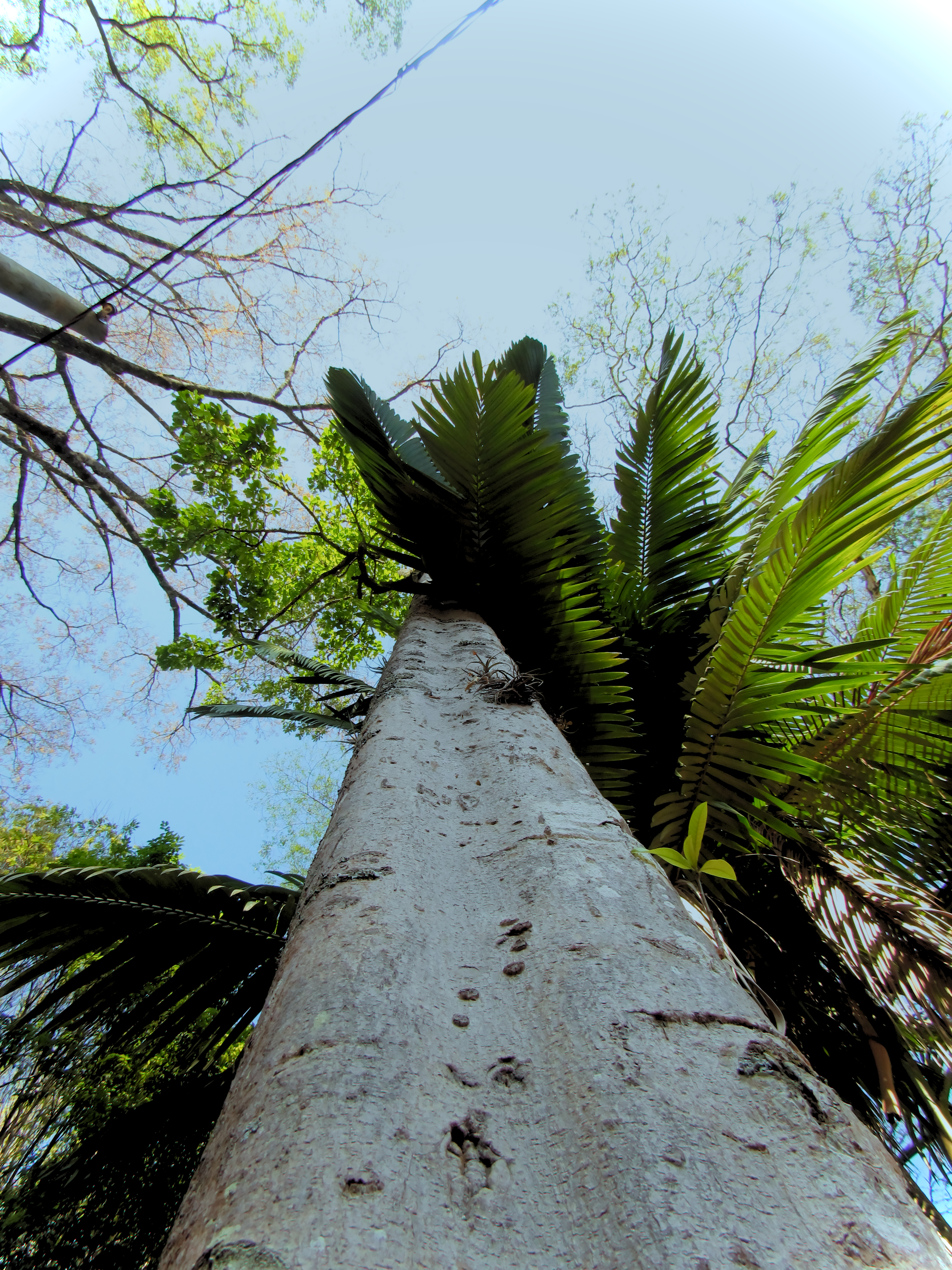

Scientific classification
- Kingdom: Plantae
- Clade: Tracheophytes
- Clade: Angiosperms
- Clade: Eudicots
- Clade: Asterids
- Order: Gentianales
- Family: Apocynaceae
- Genus: Aspidosperma
- Species: A. ramiflorum

Binomial name
- Aspidosperma ramiflorum Müll.Arg.

Synonyms
- Geissospermum ramiflorum (Müll.Arg.) Miers

= Aspidosperma ramiflorum =

Species of tree

Aspidosperma ramiflorum is a timber tree native to Brazil and Bolivia.
