= Tabernaemontana peschiera =

Scientific classification
- Kingdom: Plantae
- Clade: Tracheophytes
- Clade: Angiosperms
- Clade: Eudicots
- Clade: Asterids
- Order: Gentianales
- Family: Apocynaceae
- Genus: Tabernaemontana
- Species: T. peschiera

Binomial name
- Tabernaemontana peschiera ined.

Synonyms
- Bonafousia albiflora (Miq.) Boiteau & L.Allorge; Echites albiflorus (Miq.) Miers; Peschiera albiflora Miq.; Taberna albiflora (Miq.) Markgr.; Tabernaemontana albiflora (Miq.) Pulle, nom. illeg.

Species of plant

Tabernaemontana peschiera is a species of plant in the family Apocynaceae. It is native to northern Brazil, Suriname, and French Guiana.

== Taxonomy ==
The species was first described in 1851 by Friedrich Anton Wilhelm Miquel as Peschiera albiflora. In 1906, August Adriaan Pulle transferred it to the genus Tabernaemontana as Tabernaemontana albiflora. However, this was an illegitimate name, as it had already been used in 1897 for a different species, now accepted as Tabernaemontana catharinensis. As of November 2023, Plants of the World Online used what appears to be a replacement name, Tabernaemontana peschiera, but without a known author.
