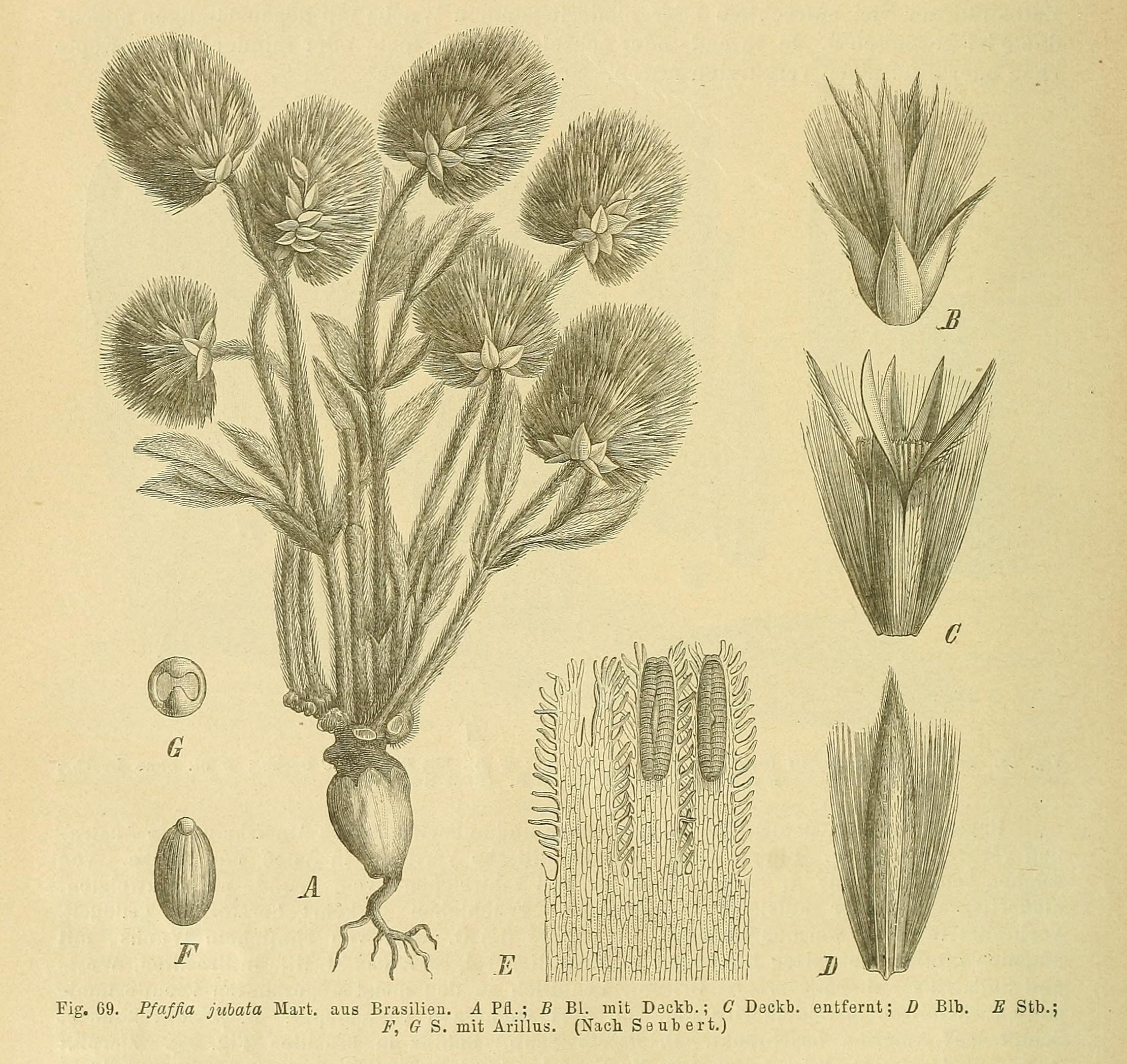

Scientific classification
- Kingdom: Plantae
- Clade: Tracheophytes
- Clade: Angiosperms
- Clade: Eudicots
- Order: Caryophyllales
- Family: Amaranthaceae
- Genus: Pfaffia
- Species: P. jubata

Binomial name
- Pfaffia jubata Mart.

Synonyms
- Gomphrena jubata (Mart.) Moq.

= Pfaffia jubata =

Species of flowering plant

Pfaffia jubata is a plant native to cerrado vegetation in Brazil.
