= Aspidosperma vargasii =

Scientific classification
- Kingdom: Plantae
- Clade: Tracheophytes
- Clade: Angiosperms
- Clade: Eudicots
- Clade: Asterids
- Order: Gentianales
- Family: Apocynaceae
- Genus: Aspidosperma
- Species: A. vargasii

Binomial name
- Aspidosperma vargasii A.DC.

Synonyms
- Macaglia vargasii (A.DC.) Kuntze

Species of tree

Aspidosperma vargasii is a timber tree native to Venezuela (including the Venezuelan islands in the Caribbean), Colombia, Peru, Guyana, and Suriname.

9-Methoxyolivacine

9-Methoxyolivacine [16101-08-9] is an alkaloid found in the bark of Aspidosperma vargasii together with N-methyltetrahydroellipticine.
