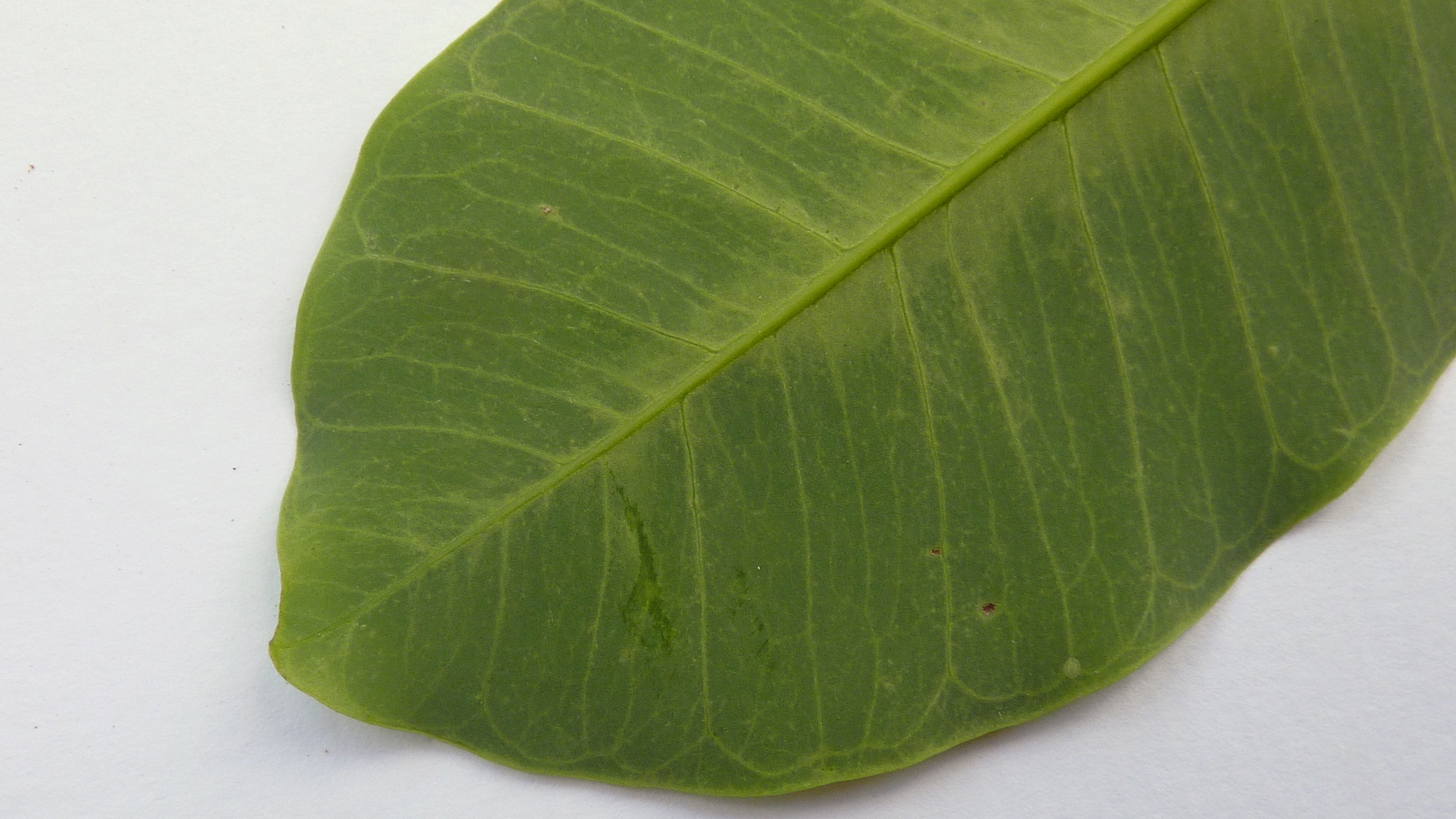

Scientific classification
- Kingdom: Plantae
- Clade: Embryophytes
- Clade: Tracheophytes
- Clade: Angiosperms
- Clade: Eudicots
- Clade: Asterids
- Order: Gentianales
- Family: Apocynaceae
- Genus: Aspidosperma
- Species: A. discolor

Binomial name
- Aspidosperma discolor A.DC.

= Aspidosperma discolor =

Species of tree

Aspidosperma discolor is a timber tree native to Brazil. This plant is cited in Flora Brasiliensis by Carl Friedrich Philipp von Martius.

Aspidosperma discolor contains an alkaloid that is called isoreserpiline.

Isoreserpiline [572-67-8].
