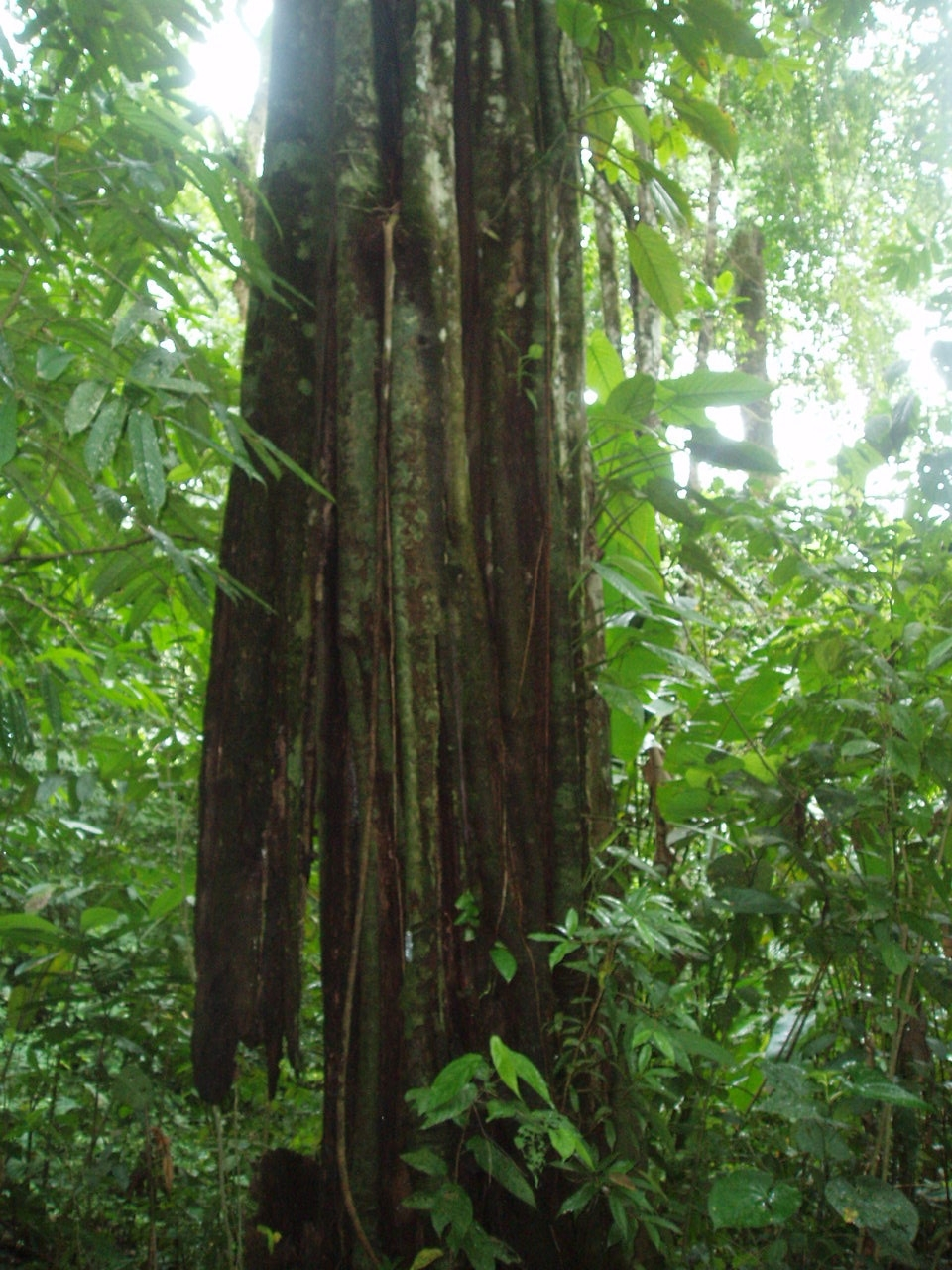

Conservation status
- Least Concern (IUCN 3.1)

Scientific classification
- Kingdom: Plantae
- Clade: Tracheophytes
- Clade: Angiosperms
- Clade: Eudicots
- Clade: Asterids
- Order: Gentianales
- Family: Apocynaceae
- Genus: Aspidosperma
- Species: A. myristicifolium

Binomial name
- Aspidosperma myristicifolium (Markgr.) Woodson

Synonyms
- Homotypic Synonyms: Geissospermum myristicifolium Markgr.; Heterotypic Synonyms: Aspidosperma elatum Little

= Aspidosperma myristicifolium =

Species of tree

Aspidosperma myristicifolium is a species of flowering plant in the family Apocynacaeae. It is known as the care tigre, cara de tigre, costilla danto, or cruácrie.

The tree has a distinctly channelled trunk and is known to grow 50 metres (160 ft) high.

== Distribution ==
Aspidosperma myristicifolium grows in Northern Brazil, Colombia, Costa Rica, Ecuador, and Peru.

== Seeds ==
Delicate seeds of thin disc embedded in larger tissue like pod of approximately 5 cm (2.0 in) across having appearance of a fried egg. Delicate tissue aids wind dispersal.
