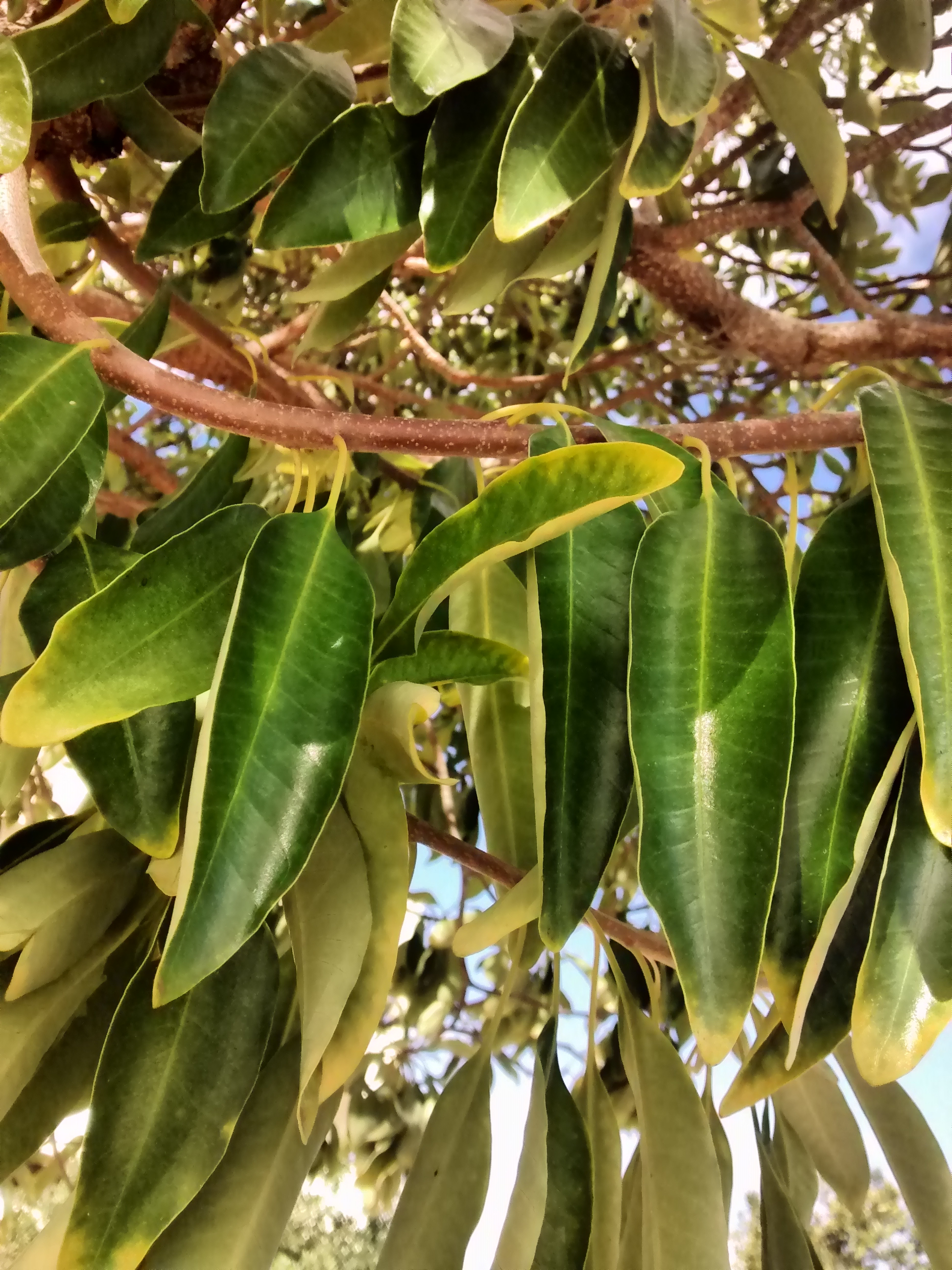

Scientific classification
- Kingdom: Plantae
- Clade: Tracheophytes
- Clade: Angiosperms
- Clade: Eudicots
- Clade: Asterids
- Order: Gentianales
- Family: Apocynaceae
- Genus: Aspidosperma
- Species: A. australe

Binomial name
- Aspidosperma australe Müll.Arg.

Synonyms
- Macaglia australis (Müll.Arg.) Kuntze; Aspidosperma argenteum Müll.Arg.; Aspidosperma missionum Speg.; Aspidosperma occidentale Malme

= Aspidosperma australe =

Species of tree

Aspidosperma australe is a timber tree native to Brazil, Argentina, Bolivia, and Paraguay.
