= Forsteronia pycnothyrsus =

Conservation status
- Data Deficient (IUCN 3.1)

Scientific classification
- Kingdom: Plantae
- Clade: Embryophytes
- Clade: Tracheophytes
- Clade: Spermatophytes
- Clade: Angiosperms
- Clade: Eudicots
- Clade: Asterids
- Order: Gentianales
- Family: Apocynaceae
- Genus: Forsteronia
- Species: F. pycnothyrsus

Binomial name
- Forsteronia pycnothyrsus K. Schum. ex Woodson

Species of plant

Forsteronia pycnothyrsus is a species of plant in the family Apocynaceae. It is endemic to Ecuador.
