= Aspidosperma pyricollum =

Conservation status
- Least Concern (IUCN 3.1)

Scientific classification
- Kingdom: Plantae
- Clade: Embryophytes
- Clade: Tracheophytes
- Clade: Angiosperms
- Clade: Eudicots
- Clade: Asterids
- Order: Gentianales
- Family: Apocynaceae
- Genus: Aspidosperma
- Species: A. pyricollum

Binomial name
- Aspidosperma pyricollum Müll.Arg.

Synonyms
- Aspidosperma longipetiolatum Kuhlm; Aspidosperma pyricollum var. obovatum Müll.Arg.

Species of tree

Aspidosperma pyricollum is a species of timber tree native to Brazil. It is native to northern, eastern, and southern Brazil, where it is common in Atlantic Forest vegetation. In addition, it is useful for beekeeping.
