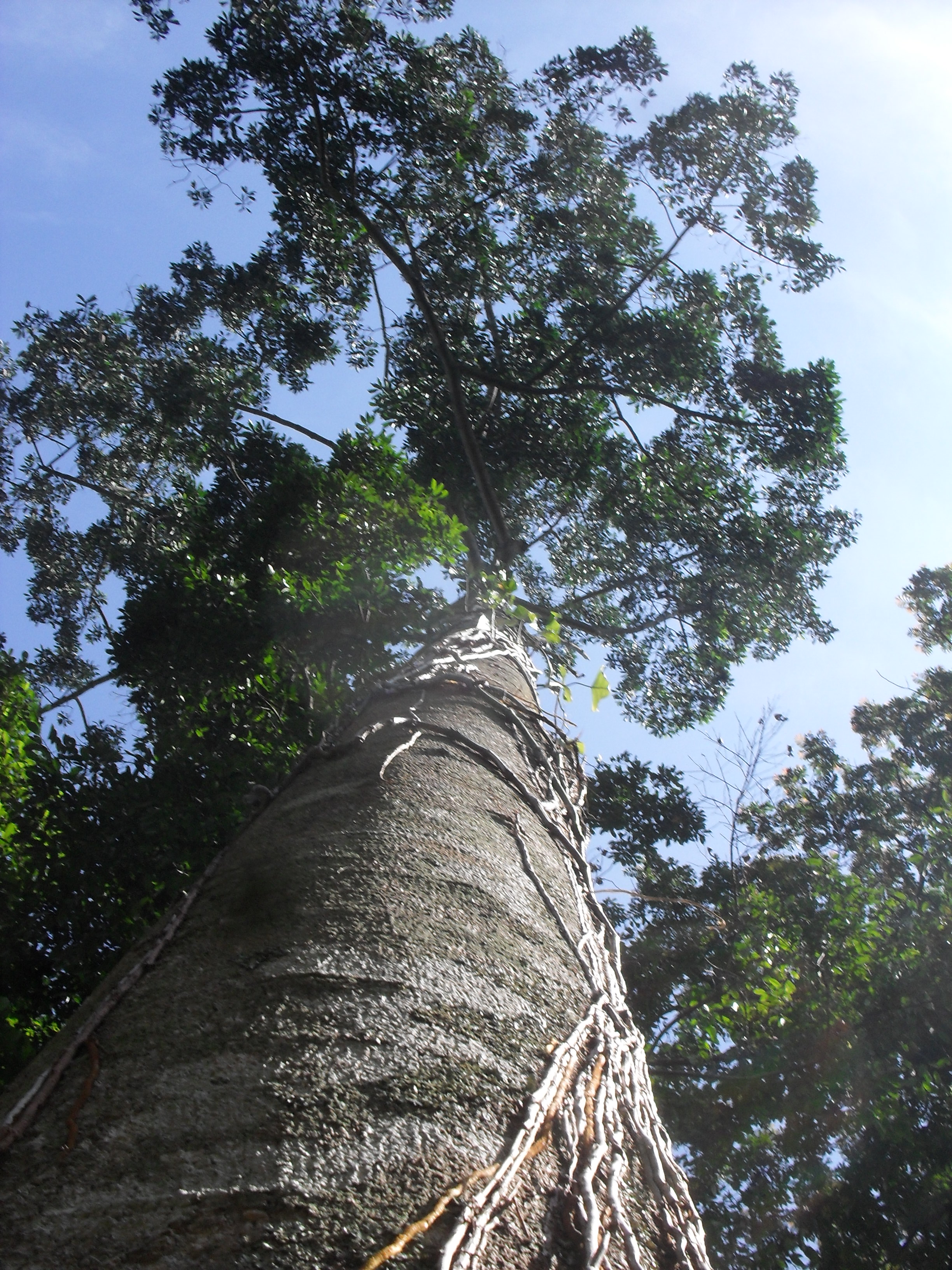

Conservation status
- Near Threatened (IUCN 2.3)

Scientific classification
- Kingdom: Plantae
- Clade: Tracheophytes
- Clade: Angiosperms
- Clade: Eudicots
- Clade: Asterids
- Order: Gentianales
- Family: Apocynaceae
- Genus: Aspidosperma
- Species: A. megalocarpon

Binomial name
- Aspidosperma megalocarpon Müll.Arg.

Synonyms
- Macaglia megalocarpa (Müll.Arg.) Kuntze; Of subsp. megalocarpon: Aspidosperma lundellianum Woodson; Aspidosperma stegomeris (Woodson) Woodson; Cufodontia arborea Woodson; Cufodontia escuintlensis Matuda; Cufodontia lundelliana Woodson; Cufodontia stegomeris Woodson; Of subsp. curranii: Aspidosperma curranii Standl.

= Aspidosperma megalocarpon =

Species of plant

Aspidosperma megalocarpon is a species of plant in the family Apocynaceae. It can be found in Belize, Colombia, Ecuador, El Salvador, Guatemala, Honduras, Mexico (Veracruz, Oaxaca, Chiapas), Nicaragua, Panama, Suriname, Venezuela, and NW Brazil.

== Subspecies ==
As of February 2023, Plants of the World Online accepted two subspecies:

1. Aspidosperma megalocarpon subsp. curranii (Standl.) Marc.-Ferr. - Panama, Colombia
2. Aspidosperma megalocarpon subsp. megalocarpon - from Veracruz to NW Brazil

== Conservation ==
Aspidosperma megalocarpon has been assessed as "near threatened". Under the synonym Aspidosperma curranii, A. megalocarpon subsp. curranii has been assessed as "vulnerable".
