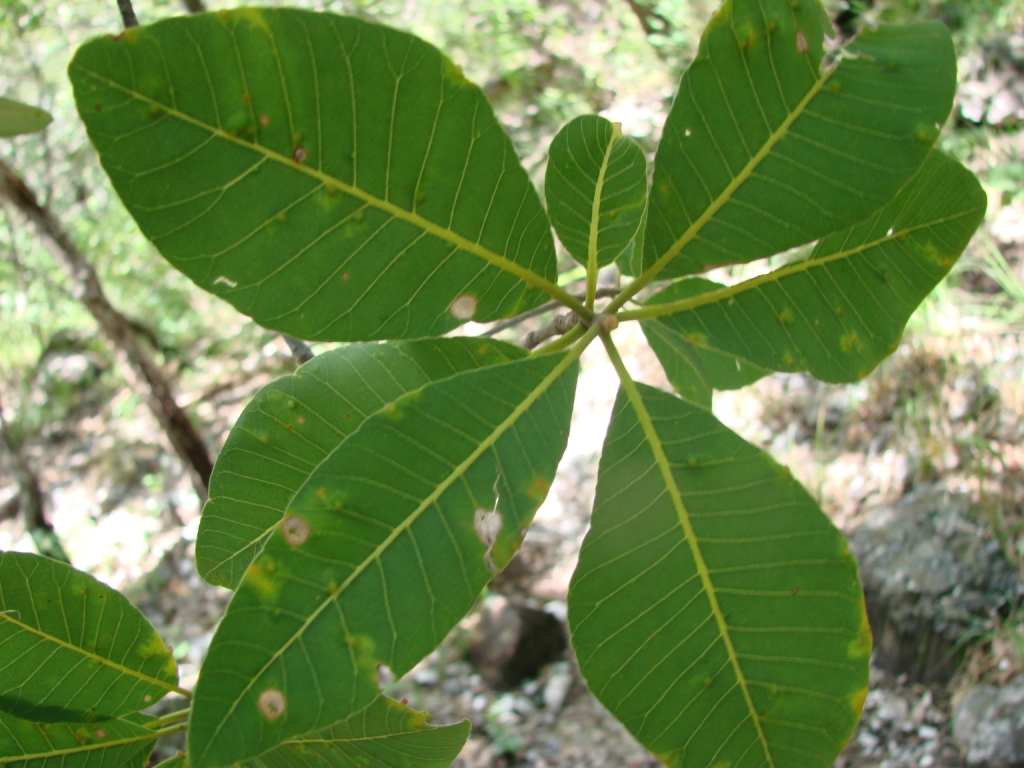

Scientific classification
- Kingdom: Plantae
- Clade: Tracheophytes
- Clade: Angiosperms
- Clade: Eudicots
- Clade: Asterids
- Order: Gentianales
- Family: Apocynaceae
- Genus: Aspidosperma
- Species: A. subincanum

Binomial name
- Aspidosperma subincanum Mart.

Synonyms
- Macaglia subincana (Mart.) Kuntze; Aspidosperma subincanum var. tomentosum Müll.Arg.

= Aspidosperma subincanum =

Species of tree

Aspidosperma subincanum is a timber tree native to Brazil and Bolivia. It is common in Cerrado vegetation in Brazil. It was first described by Carl Friedrich Philipp von Martius in 1838.
