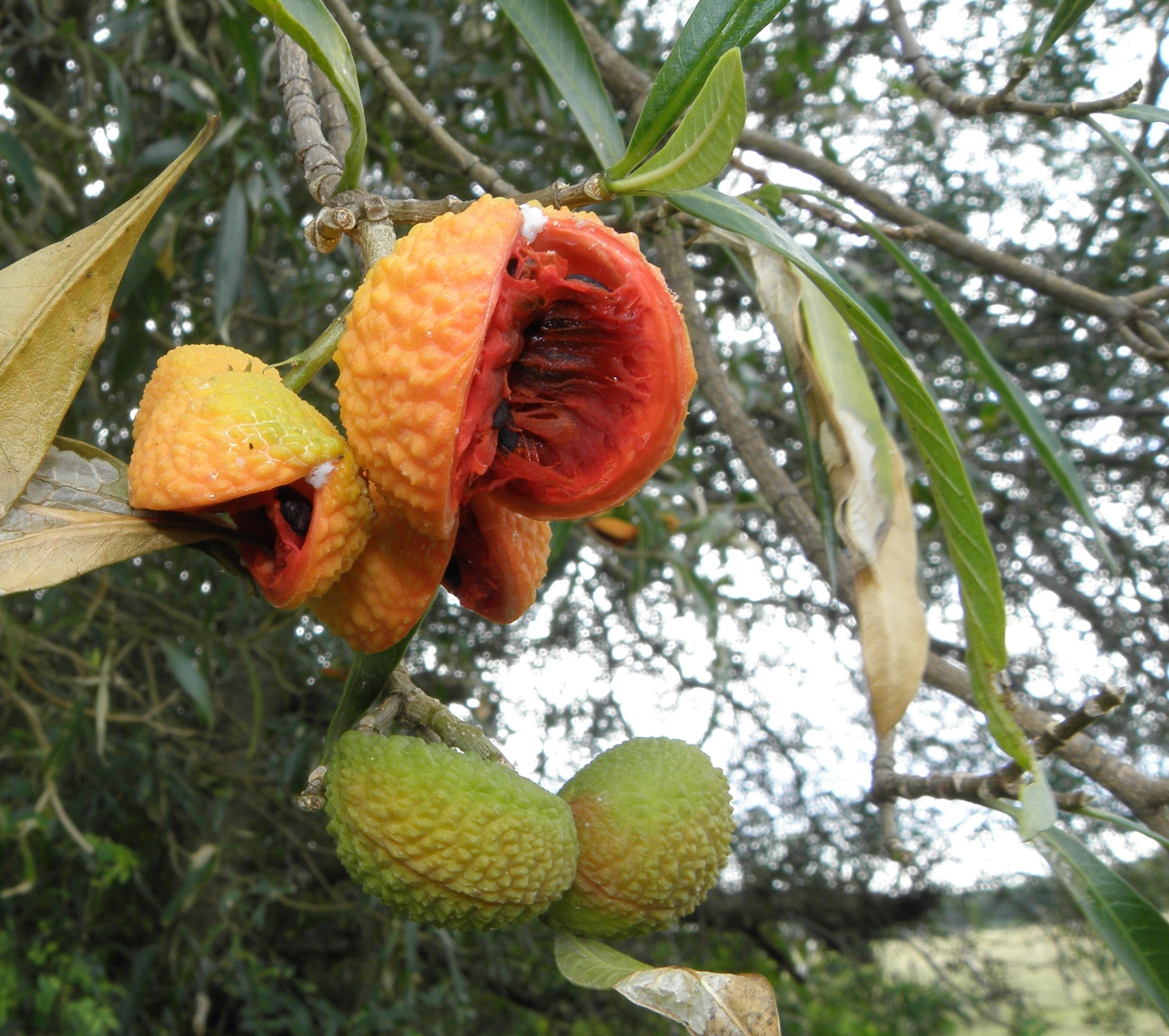

Scientific classification
- Kingdom: Plantae
- Clade: Tracheophytes
- Clade: Angiosperms
- Clade: Eudicots
- Clade: Asterids
- Order: Gentianales
- Family: Apocynaceae
- Genus: Tabernaemontana
- Species: T. catharinensis

Binomial name
- Tabernaemontana catharinensis A.DC.

Synonyms
- Peschiera acuminata (Müll.Arg.) Miers; Peschiera affinis Miers; Peschiera affinis var. acuminata L. Allorge; Peschiera albidiflora Miers; Peschiera australis (Müll.Arg.) Miers; Peschiera australis var. hilariana (Müll.Arg.) L.Allorge; Peschiera catharinensis (A.DC.) Miers; Peschiera hilariana (Müll.Arg.) Miers; Tabernaemontana acuminata Müll.Arg.; Tabernaemontana affinis Müll.Arg.; Tabernaemontana affinis var. lanceolata Müll. Arg.; Tabernaemontana albiflora Rojas Acosta; Tabernaemontana australis Müll.Arg.; Tabernaemontana hilariana Müll.Arg.; Tabernaemontana hybrida Hand.-Mazz.; Tabernaemontana salicifolia Hand.-Mazz.

= Tabernaemontana catharinensis =

Species of plant

Tabernaemontana catharinensis is a species of plant in the family Apocynaceae. It is found in southern South America.
