= Rhodocalyx =

- Rhodocalyx rotundifolius in Brazil

Scientific classification
- Kingdom: Plantae
- Clade: Tracheophytes
- Clade: Angiosperms
- Clade: Eudicots
- Clade: Asterids
- Order: Gentianales
- Family: Apocynaceae
- Subfamily: Apocynoideae
- Tribe: Echiteae
- Subtribe: Prestoniinae
- Genus: Rhodocalyx; Müll.Arg.

Species
- Rhodocalyx riedelii (Müll.Arg.) J.F.Morales, M.E.Endress & Liede; Rhodocalyx rotundifolius Müll.Arg.

Genus of flowering plants

Rhodocalyx is a genus of flowering plants in the family Apocynaceae. It includes two species native to South America, ranging from Peru and Bolivia to central and southern Brazil and northern Argentina.

- Rhodocalyx riedelii (Müll.Arg.) J.F.Morales, M.E.Endress & Liede
- Rhodocalyx rotundifolius Müll.Arg.
