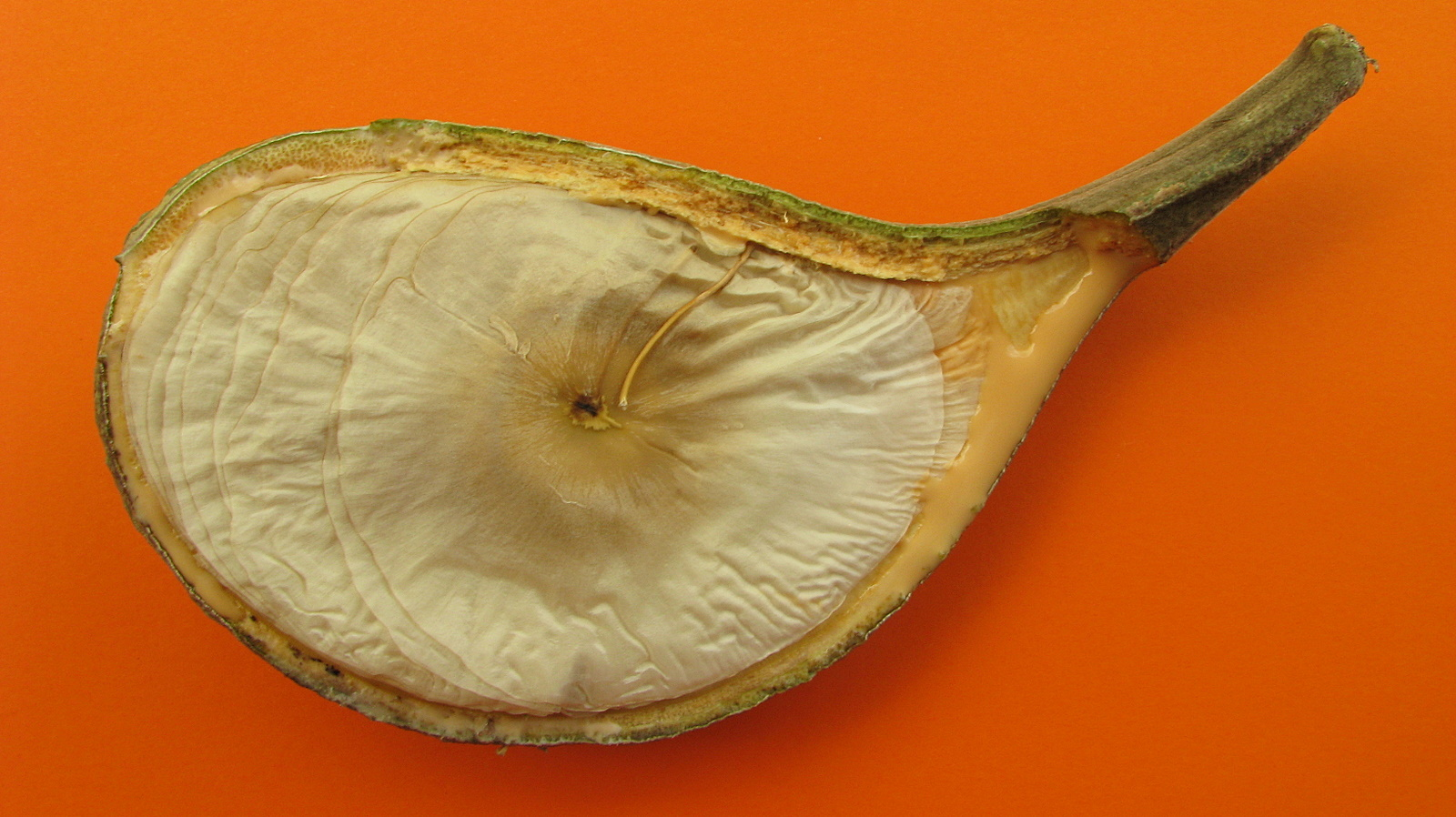

Scientific classification
- Kingdom: Plantae
- Clade: Tracheophytes
- Clade: Angiosperms
- Clade: Eudicots
- Clade: Asterids
- Order: Gentianales
- Family: Apocynaceae
- Genus: Aspidosperma
- Species: A. spruceanum

Binomial name
- Aspidosperma spruceanum Benth. ex Müll.Arg.

Synonyms
- Macaglia spruceana (Benth. ex Müll.Arg.) Kuntze; Aspidosperma melanocalyx Müll.Arg. in C.F.P. von Martius & auct. suc.; Aspidosperma verruculosum Müll.Arg. in C.F.P. von Martius & auct. suc.; Aspidosperma leucomelanum Müll.Arg.; Macaglia melanocalyx (Müll.Arg.) Kuntze; Macaglia verruculosa (Müll.Arg.) Kuntze; Aspidosperma steinbachii Markgr.; Aspidosperma cruentum Woodson; Aspidosperma igapoanum Markgr.; Aspidosperma woodsonianum Markgr.; Aspidosperma matudae Lundell; Aspidosperma paniculatum Azambuja; Aspidosperma chiapense Matuda; Aspidosperma chiapense f. tenax Matuda; Aspidosperma verruculosum var. laeve Monach.

= Aspidosperma spruceanum =

Species of tree

Aspidosperma spruceanum is a species of flowering plant in the genus Aspidosperma. It is native to Brazil, Bolivia, Peru, and the Guianas.
