= Tabernaemontana siphilitica =

Conservation status
- Least Concern (IUCN 3.1)

Scientific classification
- Kingdom: Plantae
- Clade: Tracheophytes
- Clade: Angiosperms
- Clade: Eudicots
- Clade: Asterids
- Order: Gentianales
- Family: Apocynaceae
- Genus: Tabernaemontana
- Species: T. siphilitica

Binomial name
- Tabernaemontana siphilitica (L.f.) Leeuwenb.

Synonyms
- Anacampta echinata (Aubl.) Markgr.; Anacampta hirtula (Mart. ex Müll.Arg.) Miers; Anacampta longifolia (Benth.) Miers; Bonafousia guyanensis (Müll.Arg.) Miers; Bonafousia hirtula (Mart. ex Müll.Arg.) Markgr.; Bonafousia juruana Markgr.; Bonafousia killipii (Woodson) Markgr.; Bonafousia siphilitica (L.f.) L.Allorge; Bonafousia siphilitica var. hirtula (Mart. ex Müll.Arg.) L.Allorge; Bonafousia siphilitica var. juruana (Markgr.) L.Allorge; Bonafousia speciosa (Poir.) Boiteau; Bonafousia tessmannii Markgr.; Bonafousia tetrastachya (Kunth) Markgr.; Echites siphiliticus L.f.; Malouetia tetrastachya (Kunth) Miers; Mesechites siphiliticus (L.f.) Lemée; Peschiera echinata (Aubl.) A.DC.; Tabernaemontana cuyabensis Malme; Tabernaemontana duckei Huber; Tabernaemontana echinata Aubl.; Tabernaemontana guianensis Miq.; Tabernaemontana guyanensis Müll.Arg.; Tabernaemontana hirtula Mart. ex Müll.Arg.; Tabernaemontana juruana (Markgr.) K.Schum. ex J.F.Macbr.; Tabernaemontana killipii Woodson; Tabernaemontana longifolia Benth.; Tabernaemontana repanda E.Mey.; Tabernaemontana speciosa Poir.; Tabernaemontana speciosa Lam.; Tabernaemontana tessmannii (Markgr.) J.F.Macbr.; Tabernaemontana tetrastachya Kunth

Species of plant

Tabernaemontana siphilitica is a species of plant in the family Apocynaceae.

The species is a plant native to Brazil, widely distributed in the North (Acre, Amazonas, Pará, Roraima, Tocantins), Northeast (Maranhão), and Central-West (Mato Grosso do Sul, Mato Grosso) regions. Found in the Amazon and Cerrado phytogeographic domains, it occurs in various vegetation types, including riparian or gallery forests, terra firme forests, floodplains, semideciduous seasonal forests, and Amazonian savannas. Despite its presence in different habitats, it is not endemic to Brazil.
