= Aspidosperma excelsum =

Scientific classification
- Kingdom: Plantae
- Clade: Tracheophytes
- Clade: Angiosperms
- Clade: Eudicots
- Clade: Asterids
- Order: Gentianales
- Family: Apocynaceae
- Genus: Aspidosperma
- Species: A. excelsum

Binomial name
- Aspidosperma excelsum Benth.

Synonyms
- Macaglia excelsa (Benth.) Kuntze; Aspidosperma aquaticum Ducke; Aspidosperma nitidum Benth. ex Müll.Arg.; Thyroma nitida (Benth. ex Müll.Arg.) Miers

Species of tree

Aspidosperma excelsum (common name remo caspi) is a tree in the family Apocynaceae which grows up to one hundred feet (thirty meters) in height. It is native to Peru, Bolivia, Colombia, Venezuela, the Guianas, Panama, and Costa Rica. Its most interesting characteristic is its trunk, which has a deeply sinuous cross-section, usually described as stellate, It is thought these sinuosities offer some protection against strangling figs (ficus spp), Copay (Clusia spp) and other stranglers by making it more difficult to encircle the tree's cambium.
