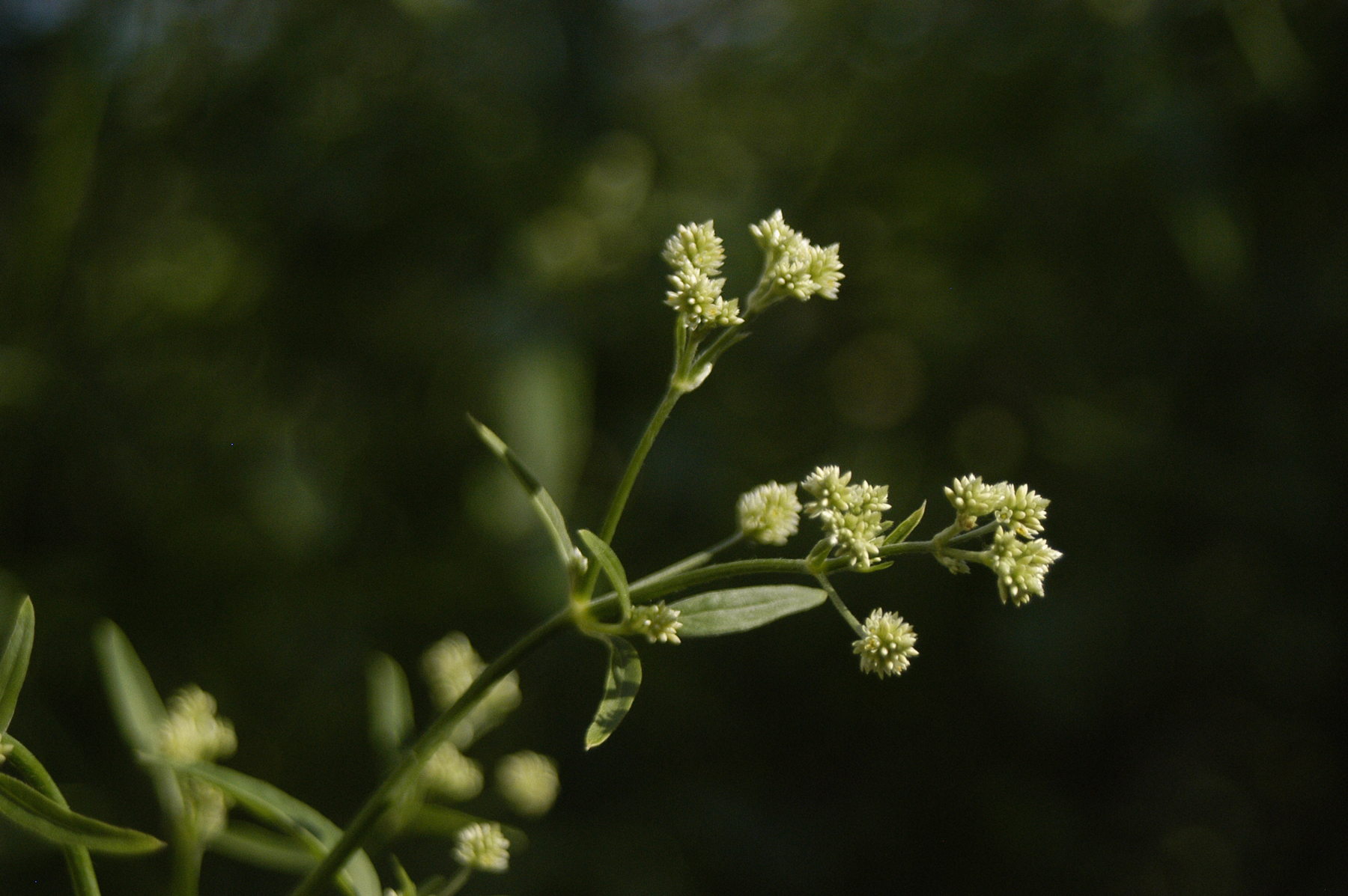

Scientific classification
- Kingdom: Plantae
- Clade: Tracheophytes
- Clade: Angiosperms
- Clade: Eudicots
- Order: Caryophyllales
- Family: Amaranthaceae
- Genus: Pfaffia
- Species: P. glomerata

Binomial name
- Pfaffia glomerata (Spreng.) Pedersen

Synonyms
- Alternanthera glauca Gomphrena dunaliana Gomphrena glauca Gomphrena luzulaeflora Gomphrena stenophylla Iresine glomerata Iresine luzuliflora Mogiphanes dunaliana Mogiphanes glauca Pfaffia divergens Pfaffia dunaliana Pfaffia glabrescens Pfaffia glauca Pfaffia iresinoides Pfaffia luzulaeflora Pfaffia stenophylla Sertuernera glauca Sertuernera luzulaeflora

= Pfaffia glomerata =

Species of flowering plant

Pfaffia glomerata is a medicinal plant native to Argentina, Bolivia. Cerrado, and Pantanal in Brazil.

Pfaffia glomerata is considered an aphrodisiac, potentially due to the presence of β-ecdysone in its roots. This steroid is thought to influence libido.

Pfaffia glomerata contains gallic acid, pfaffic acid, glomeric acid, oleanolic acid, saponins, anthraquinones, tannins, flavonoids, rubrosterone, and ecdysterone, in addition to primary metabolites such as inulin-type fructans and fructooligosaccharides.
