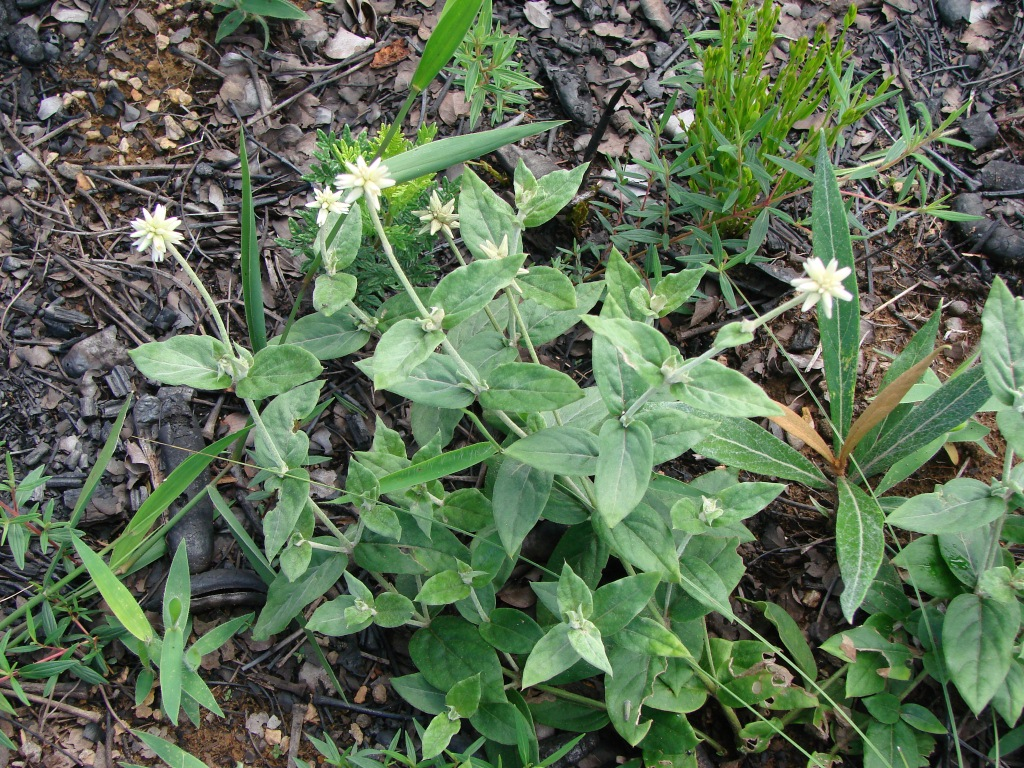
- Pfaffia townsendii

Scientific classification
- Kingdom: Plantae
- Clade: Tracheophytes
- Clade: Angiosperms
- Clade: Eudicots
- Order: Caryophyllales
- Family: Amaranthaceae
- Subfamily: Gomphrenoideae
- Genus: Pfaffia; Mart.

Species
- See text.

Synonyms
- Sertuernera Mart.

= Pfaffia =

Genus of flowering plants

Pfaffia is a genus of plants in the family Amaranthaceae.

== Species ==
As of April 2022, Plants of the World Online accepted the following species:

- Pfaffia acutifolia (Moq.) O.Stützer
- Pfaffia aphylla Suess.
- Pfaffia argyrea Pedersen
- Pfaffia brunae Marchior.
- Pfaffia cipoana Marchior., Miotto & J.C.Siqueira
- Pfaffia densipellita Borsch
- Pfaffia denudata (Moq.) Kuntze
- Pfaffia elata R.E.Fr.
- Pfaffia eriocephala Suess.
- Pfaffia fruticulosa Suess.
- Pfaffia glabrata Mart.
- Pfaffia gleasonii Suess.
- Pfaffia glomerata (Spreng.) Pedersen
- Pfaffia gnaphalioides (L.f.) Mart.
- Pfaffia helichrysoides (Moq.) Kuntze
- Pfaffia hirtula Mart.
- Pfaffia iresinoides (Kunth) Spreng.
- Pfaffia jubata Mart.
- Pfaffia minarum Pedersen
- Pfaffia miraflorensis Agudello & P.Franco
- Pfaffia ninae Pedersen
- Pfaffia nudicaulis Suess.
- Pfaffia patiensis Agudelo
- Pfaffia rotundifolia Pedersen
- Pfaffia rupestris Marchior., Miotto & J.C.Siqueira
- Pfaffia sarcophylla Pedersen
- Pfaffia sericantha (Mart.) Pedersen
- Pfaffia siqueiriana Marchior. & Miotto
- Pfaffia tayronensis Agudelo
- Pfaffia townsendii Pedersen
- Pfaffia tuberculosa Pedersen
- Pfaffia tuberosa (Spreng.) Hicken
- Pfaffia velutina Mart.

== Former species ==
- Pfaffia paniculata - Suma root, Brazilian ginseng, now classified as Hebanthe erianthos
