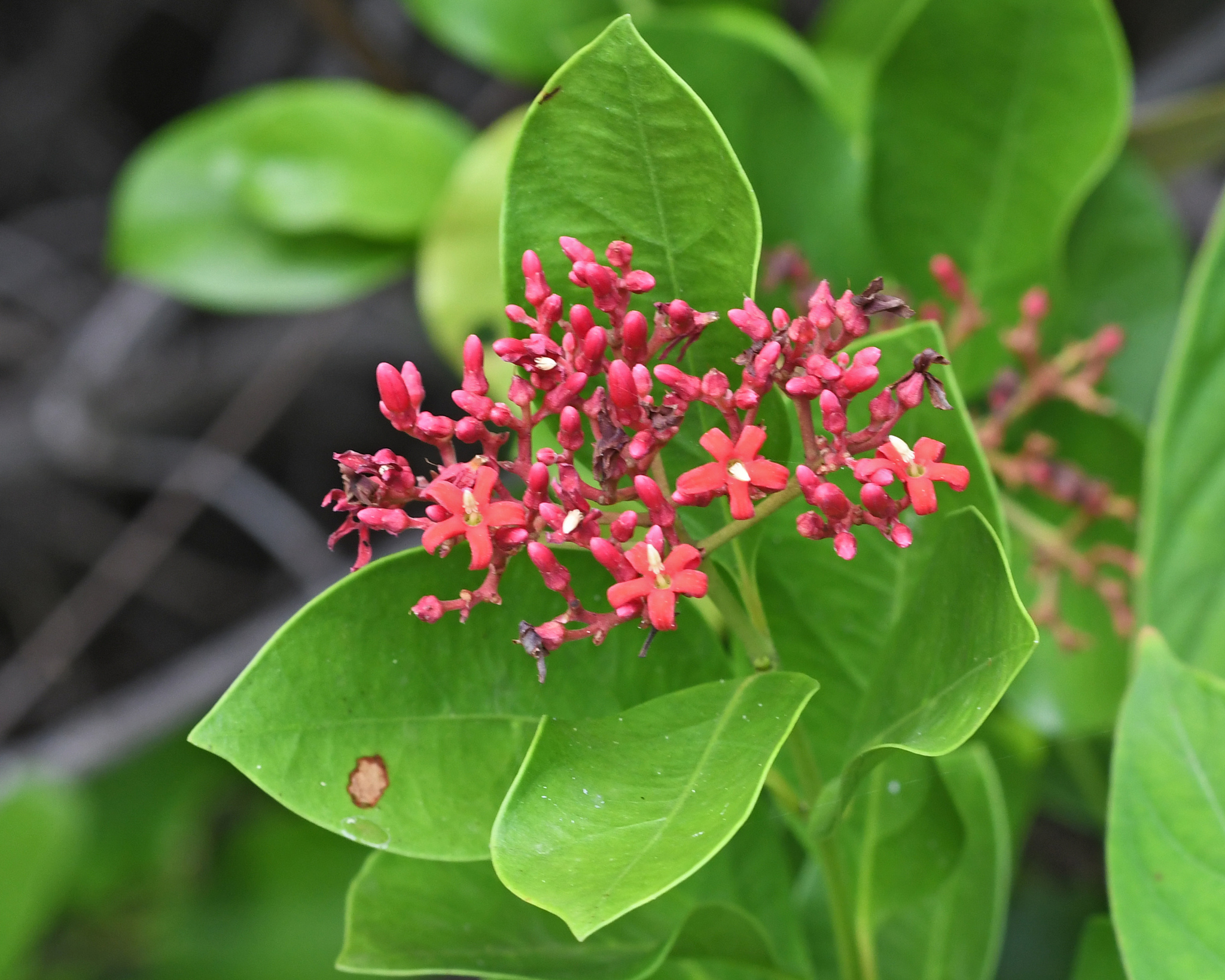

Conservation status
- Least Concern (IUCN 3.1)

Scientific classification
- Kingdom: Plantae
- Clade: Tracheophytes
- Clade: Angiosperms
- Clade: Eudicots
- Clade: Asterids
- Order: Gentianales
- Family: Apocynaceae
- Genus: Pinochia
- Species: P. corymbosa

Binomial name
- Pinochia corymbosa (Jacq.) M.E.Endress & B.F.Hansen

Subspecies
- See text.

Synonyms
- Echites corymbosus Jacq.; Forsteronia corymbosa (Jacq.) G.Mey.; Parsonsia corymbosa (Jacq.) R.Br. ex Steud.; Thyrsanthus corymbosus (Jacq.) Miers

= Pinochia corymbosa =

Bejuco de San Juan

Species of plant

Pinochia corymbosa, commonly known as Bejuco de San Juan, is a species of flowering plant in the family Apocynaceae, native to the Greater Antilles (Cuba, the Dominican Republic, Haiti and Puerto Rico). It was first described by Nikolaus Joseph von Jacquin in 1760 as Echites corymbosus.

== Subspecies ==
Two subspecies are recognized:

- Pinochia corymbosa subsp. corymbosa – Cuba and Hispaniola
- Pinochia corymbosa subsp. portoricensis (Woodson) M.E.Endress & B.F.Hansen – Puerto Rico

Pinochia corymbosa subsp. portoricensis, synonym Forsteronia portoricensis, is endemic to Puerto Rico, and typically grows in moist regions of woods, thickets, or forests. It can reach a maximum length of 7 m (23 ft), and produces a large quantity of red flowers.
