= Pinochia =

Scientific classification
- Kingdom: Plantae
- Clade: Tracheophytes
- Clade: Angiosperms
- Clade: Eudicots
- Clade: Asterids
- Order: Gentianales
- Family: Apocynaceae
- Subfamily: Apocynoideae
- Tribe: Odontadenieae
- Genus: Pinochia; M.E.Endress & B.F.Hansen

Genus of flowering plants

Pinochia is a genus of plants in the family Apocynaceae, first described as a genus in 2007. It is native to Central America, Mexico, and the West Indies.

Species

- Pinochia corymbosa (Jacq.) M.E.Endress & B.F.Hansen - Cuba, Hispaniola, Puerto Rico
- Pinochia floribunda (Sw.) M.E.Endress & B.F.Hansen - Cuba, Jamaica
- Pinochia monteverdensis (J.F.Morales) M.E.Endress & B.F.Hansen - Oaxaca, Costa Rica, Guatemala
- Pinochia peninsularis (Woodson) M.E.Endress & B.F.Hansen - Belize, Guatemala, Nicaragua, Panama, Chiapas, Tabasco, Campeche
