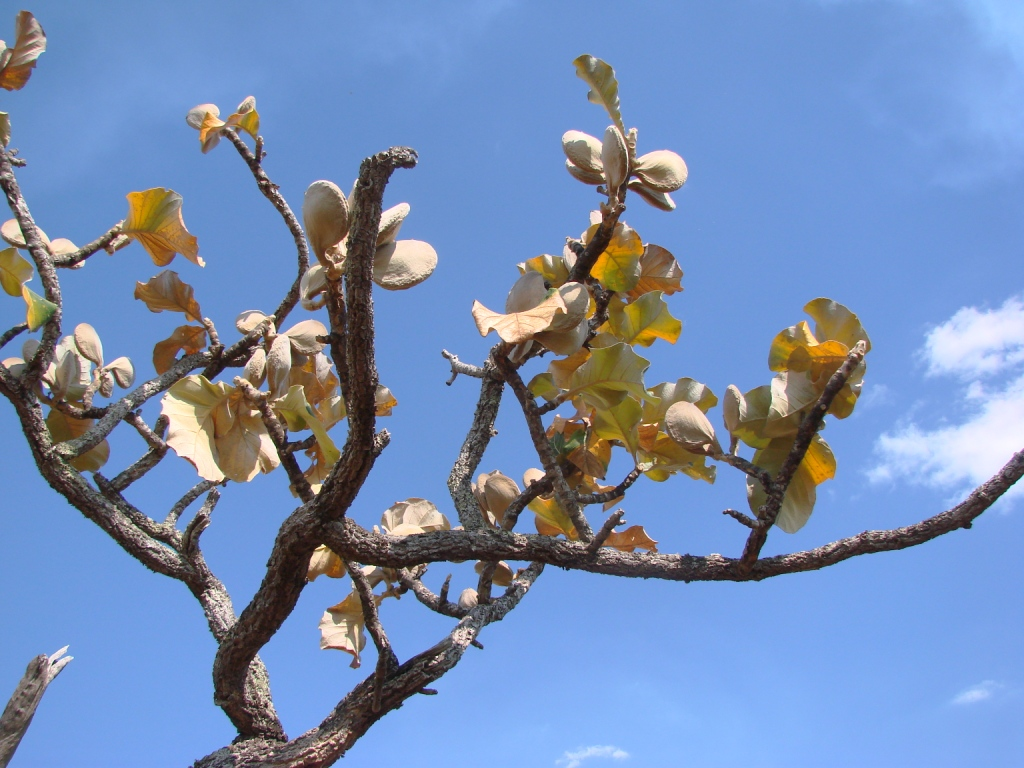

Scientific classification
- Kingdom: Plantae
- Clade: Tracheophytes
- Clade: Angiosperms
- Clade: Eudicots
- Clade: Asterids
- Order: Gentianales
- Family: Apocynaceae
- Genus: Aspidosperma
- Species: A. macrocarpon

Binomial name
- Aspidosperma macrocarpon Mart.

Synonyms
- Aspidosperma macrocarpon var. normale Müll.Arg.; Macaglia macrocarpa (Mart.) Kuntze; Aspidosperma gardneri Müll.Arg.; Aspidosperma platyphyllum Müll.Arg.; Aspidosperma verbascifolium Müll.Arg.; Macaglia gardneri (Müll.Arg.) Kuntze; Macaglia platyphylla (Müll.Arg.) Kuntze; Macaglia verbascifolia (Müll.Arg.) Kuntze; Macaglia lanata Kuntze; Aspidosperma duckei Huber 1910; Aspidosperma duckei Huber ex Ducke 1922 not Huber 1910; Aspidosperma lanatum (Kuntze) Malme; Aspidosperma snethlagei Markgr.; Aspidosperma lecointei Record ex Milanez

= Aspidosperma macrocarpon =

Species of tree

Aspidosperma macrocarpon is a timber tree native to Brazil, Venezuela, Bolivia, Paraguay, and Peru. It is common in Cerrado vegetation. It has a self-supporting growth form with simple, broad leaves. This plant is cited in Flora Brasiliensis by Carl Friedrich Philipp von Martius, and it is useful for beekeeping. Individual plants can grow up to 25 m.

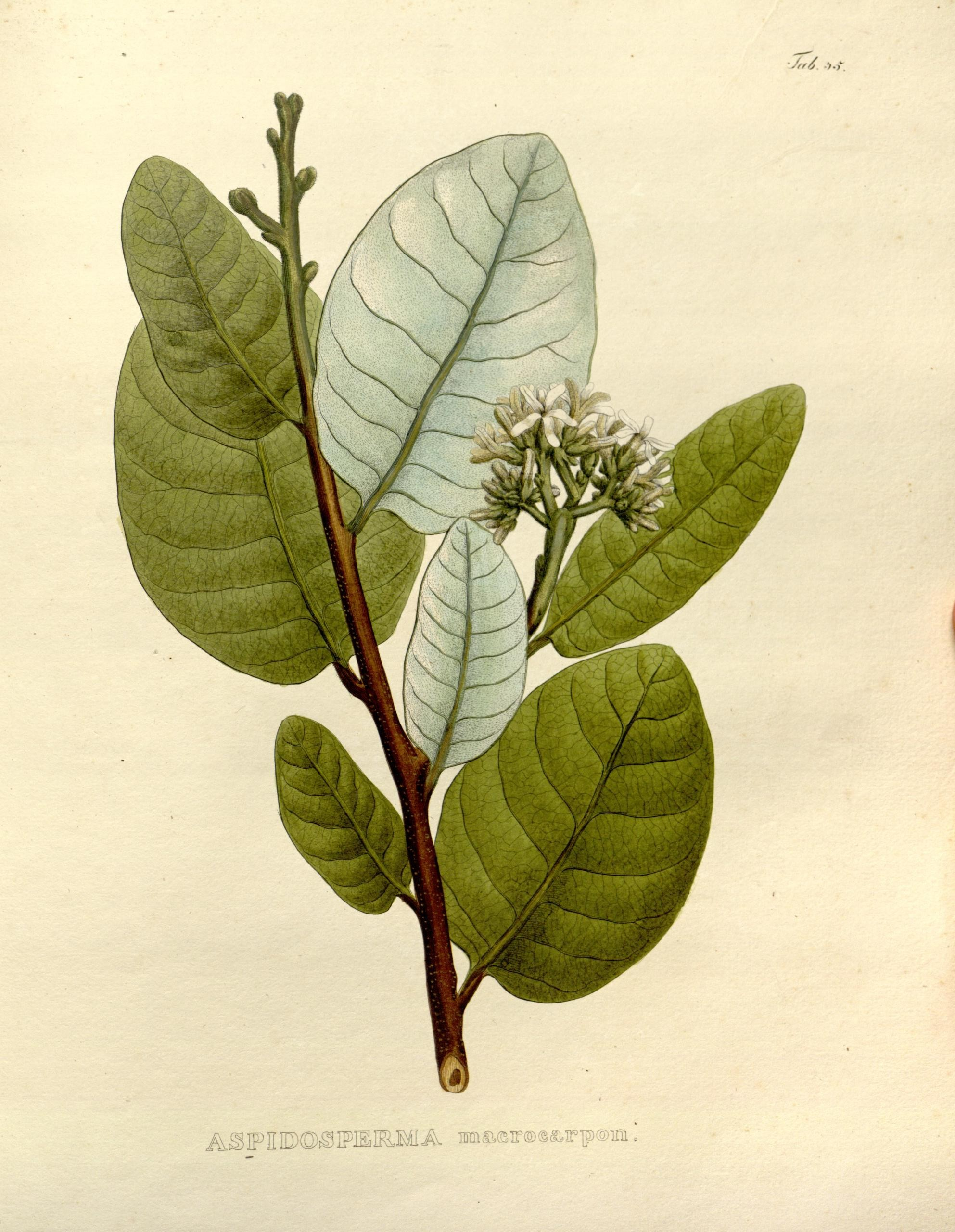
Illustration showing leaves, buds and flowers.
