= Pinochia monteverdensis =

Scientific classification
- Kingdom: Plantae
- Clade: Tracheophytes
- Clade: Angiosperms
- Clade: Eudicots
- Clade: Asterids
- Order: Gentianales
- Family: Apocynaceae
- Genus: Pinochia
- Species: P. monteverdensis

Binomial name
- Pinochia monteverdensis (J.F. Morales) M.E. Endress & B.F. Hansen

Synonyms
- Forsteronia monteverdensis J.F. Morales

Species of flowering plant

Pinochia monteverdensis is a plant species native to Costa Rica, Guatemala and Oaxaca.

Pinochia monteverdensis is a liana climbing over other vegetation. Leaves are elliptic or oblanceolate, up to 13 cm long and 4 cm wide, tapering to a point at the tip. Calyx lobes are tapering, up to 2 mm long, with hairs. Corolla white, up to 4 mm long, the tube hairless but the lobes hairy. Follicle non-hairy, up to 20 cm long.
