= Nicolás Rojas Acosta =

Prof. Nicolás Rojas Acosta (1873–1946) was an Argentine academic and botanist.

He explored the Gran Chaco in depth and was an expert in Bambusoideae and Cactaceae.

== Works ==
- Rojas Acosta, N. 1918. Addenda ad floram regionis Chaco Australis (pars secunda). Bull. Acad. Int. Géogr. Bot. 26: 157–158
- Rojas Acosta, N. 1897. Historia natural de Corrientes : catálogo. Mineralogía, Gea Paleontología, Flora i Fauna que comprende principalmente los vejetales i animales de las provincias i territorios limítrofes. Publicación Buenos Aires : Imprenta El Hogar y la Escuela, 1897, 214 p.
- Rojas Acosta, N. 1915. Nociones sobre paleontología de Corrientes. Publicación [S.l.] : E. Dupuis, 1915
