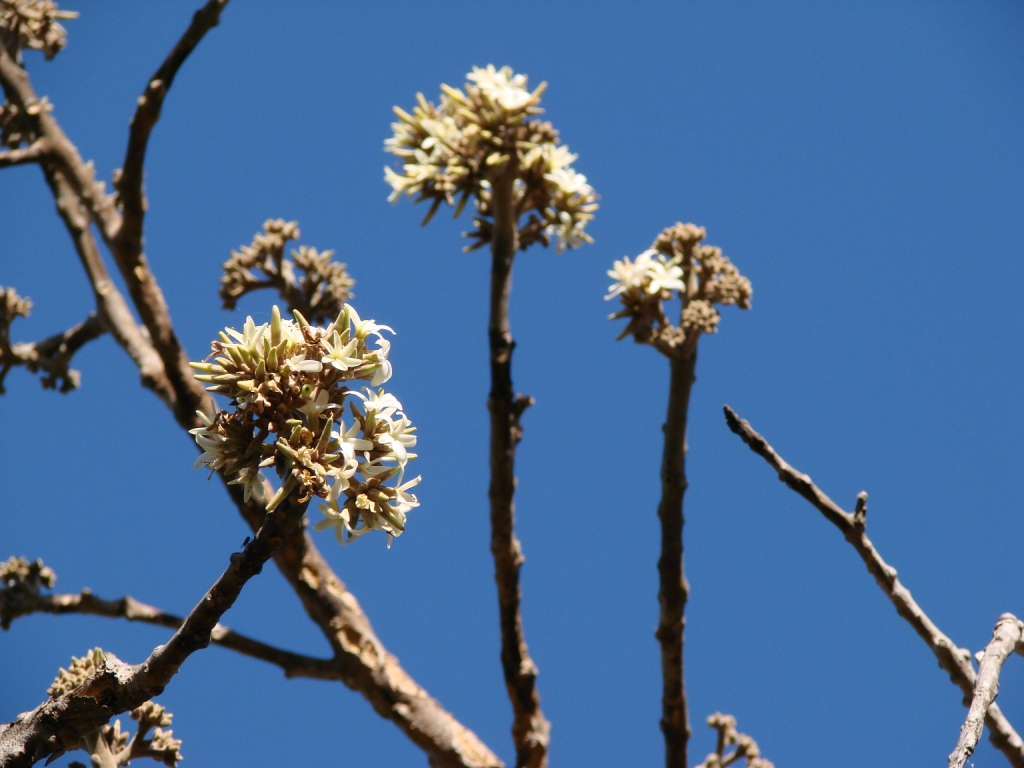

Scientific classification
- Kingdom: Plantae
- Clade: Tracheophytes
- Clade: Angiosperms
- Clade: Eudicots
- Clade: Asterids
- Order: Gentianales
- Family: Apocynaceae
- Genus: Aspidosperma
- Species: A. tomentosum

Binomial name
- Aspidosperma tomentosum Mart.

Synonyms
- Macaglia tomentosa (Mart.) Kuntze; Aspidosperma dasycarpon A.DC.; Aspidosperma gomezianum A.DC.; Aspidosperma hilarianum Müll.Arg.; Aspidosperma obscurum Müll.Arg.; Aspidosperma pallidiflorum Müll.Arg.; Macaglia dasycarpa (A.DC.) Kuntze; Macaglia gomeziana (A.DC.) Kuntze; Macaglia hilariana (Müll.Arg.) Kuntze; Macaglia obscura (Müll.Arg.) Kuntze; Aspidosperma rojasii Hassl.; Aspidosperma chodatii Hassl. ex Markgr

= Aspidosperma tomentosum =

Species of tree

Aspidosperma tomentosum is a timber tree native to Brazil, Bolivia, and Paraguay. It is common in of Cerrado vegetation in Brazil. It was first described by Carl Friedrich Philipp von Martius.

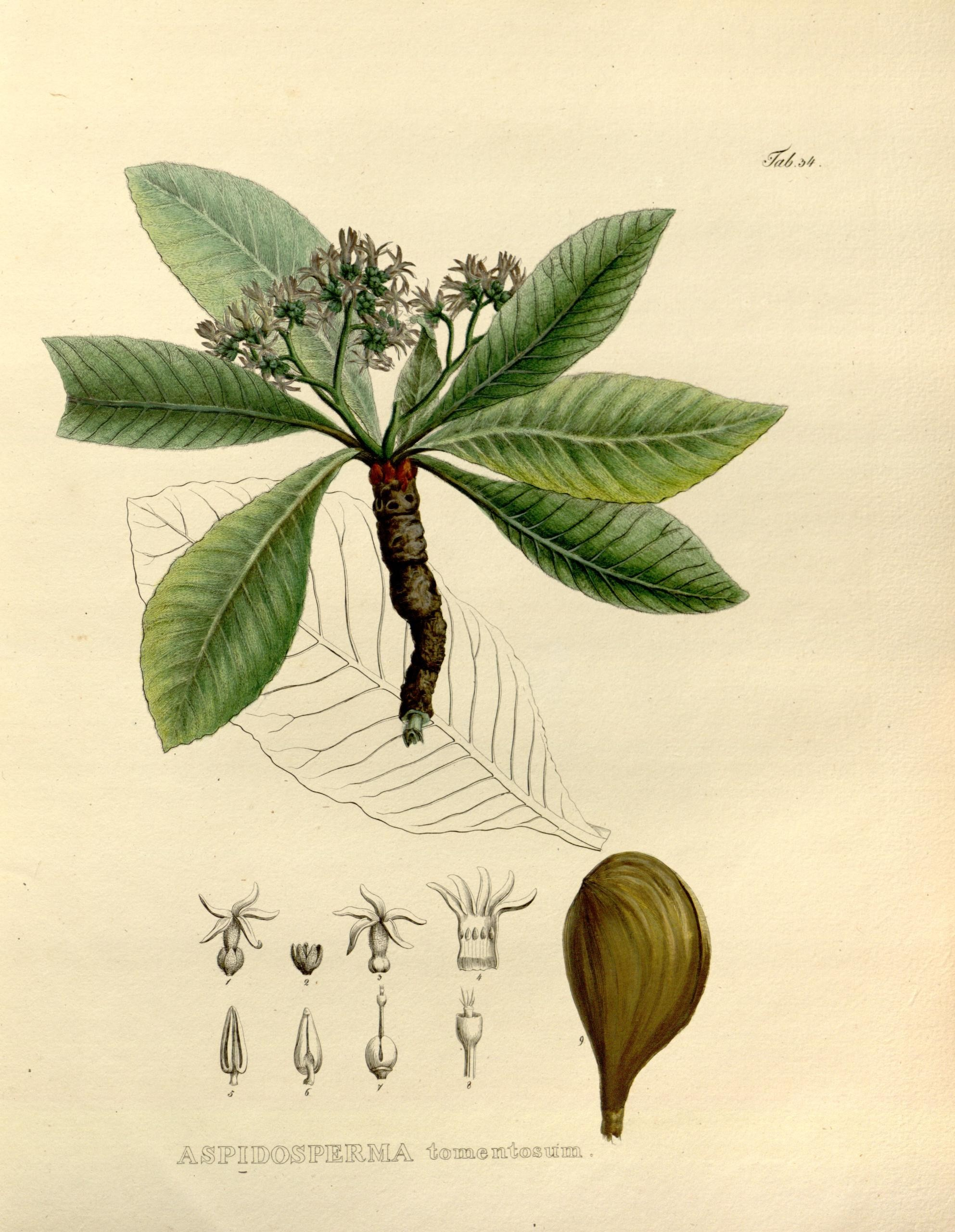
Illustration showing details of plant.
