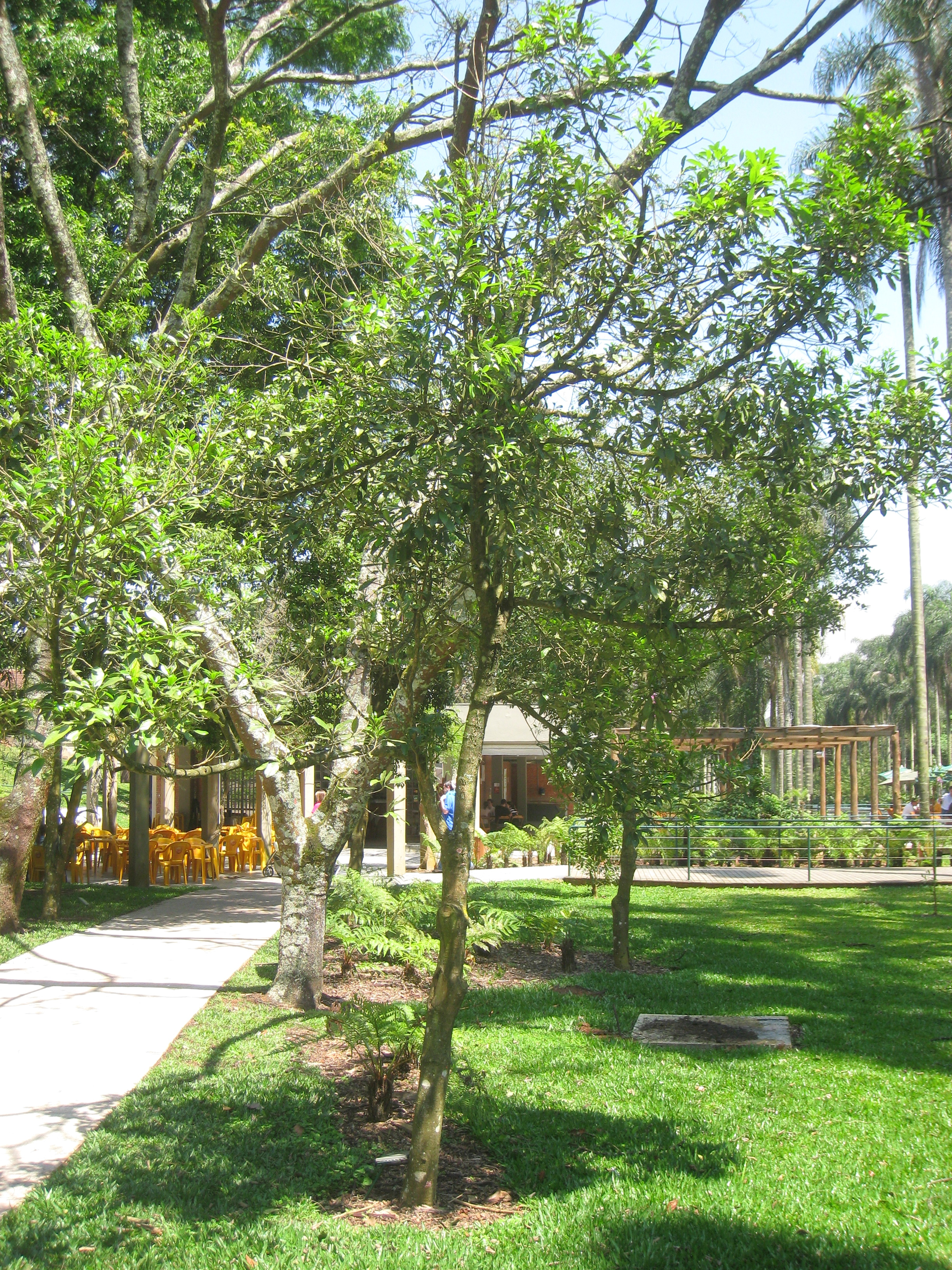

Scientific classification
- Kingdom: Plantae
- Clade: Tracheophytes
- Clade: Angiosperms
- Clade: Eudicots
- Clade: Asterids
- Order: Gentianales
- Family: Apocynaceae
- Genus: Aspidosperma
- Species: A. parvifolium

Binomial name
- Aspidosperma parvifolium A.DC.

Synonyms
- Thyroma parvifolia (A.DC.) Miers; Aspidosperma ingratum K.Schum.; Aspidosperma tambopatense A.H.Gentry

= Aspidosperma parvifolium =

Species of tree

Aspidosperma parvifolium is a timber tree native to Brazil, which is typical of Atlantic Forest, Cerrado, Caatinga, and Pantanal vegetation. This plant is cited in Flora Brasiliensis by Carl Friedrich Philipp von Martius. In addition, it is useful for beekeeping.
