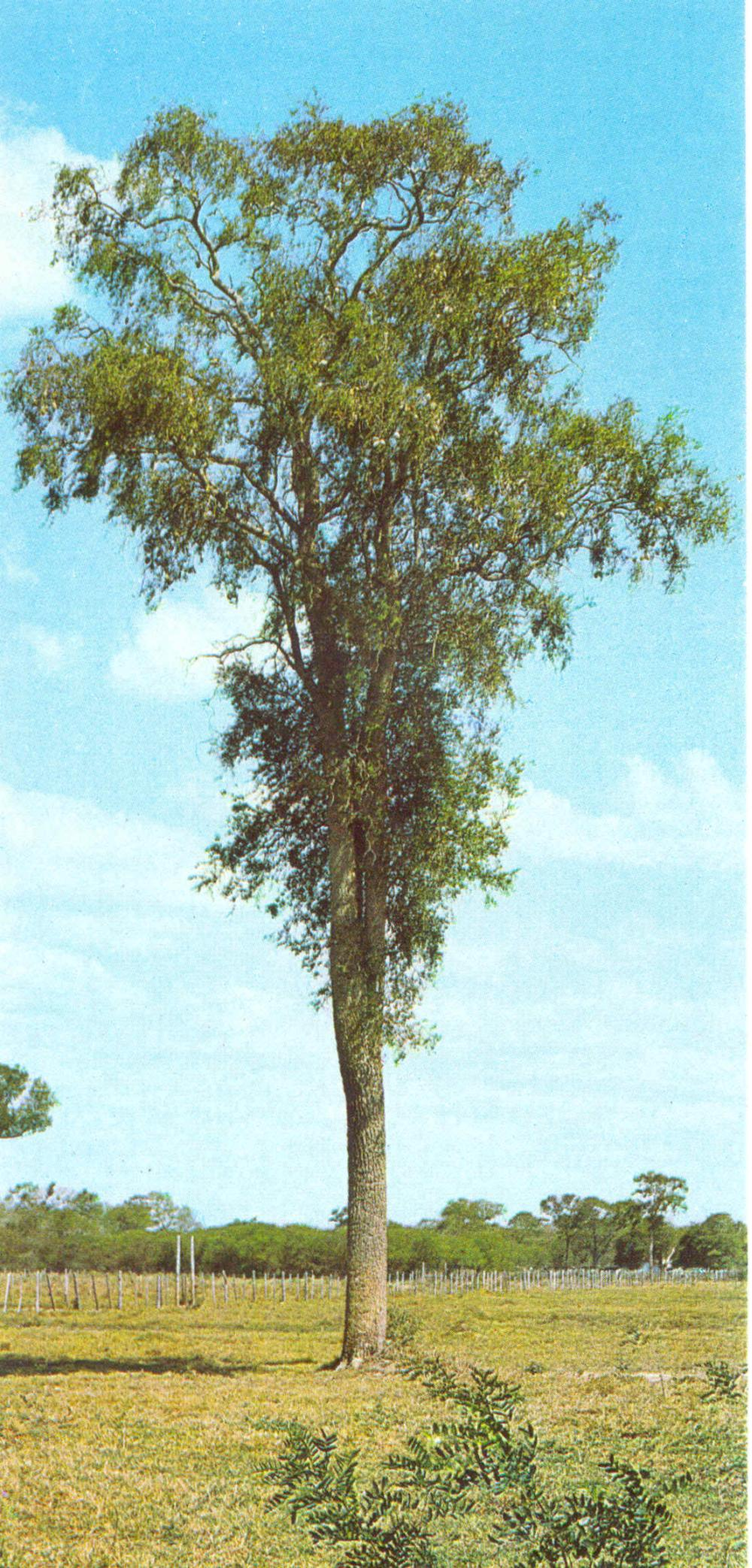
- Aspidosperma quebracho-blanco

Scientific classification
- Kingdom: Plantae
- Clade: Tracheophytes
- Clade: Angiosperms
- Clade: Eudicots
- Clade: Asterids
- Order: Gentianales
- Family: Apocynaceae
- Subfamily: Rauvolfioideae
- Tribe: Aspidospermateae
- Genus: Aspidosperma; Mart. & Zucc.

Synonyms
- Coutinia Vell.; Cufodontia Woodson; Macaglia Rich. ex Vahl, rejected name; Paralyxia Baill.; Peltospermum DC.; Thyroma Miers

= Aspidosperma =

Genus of plants

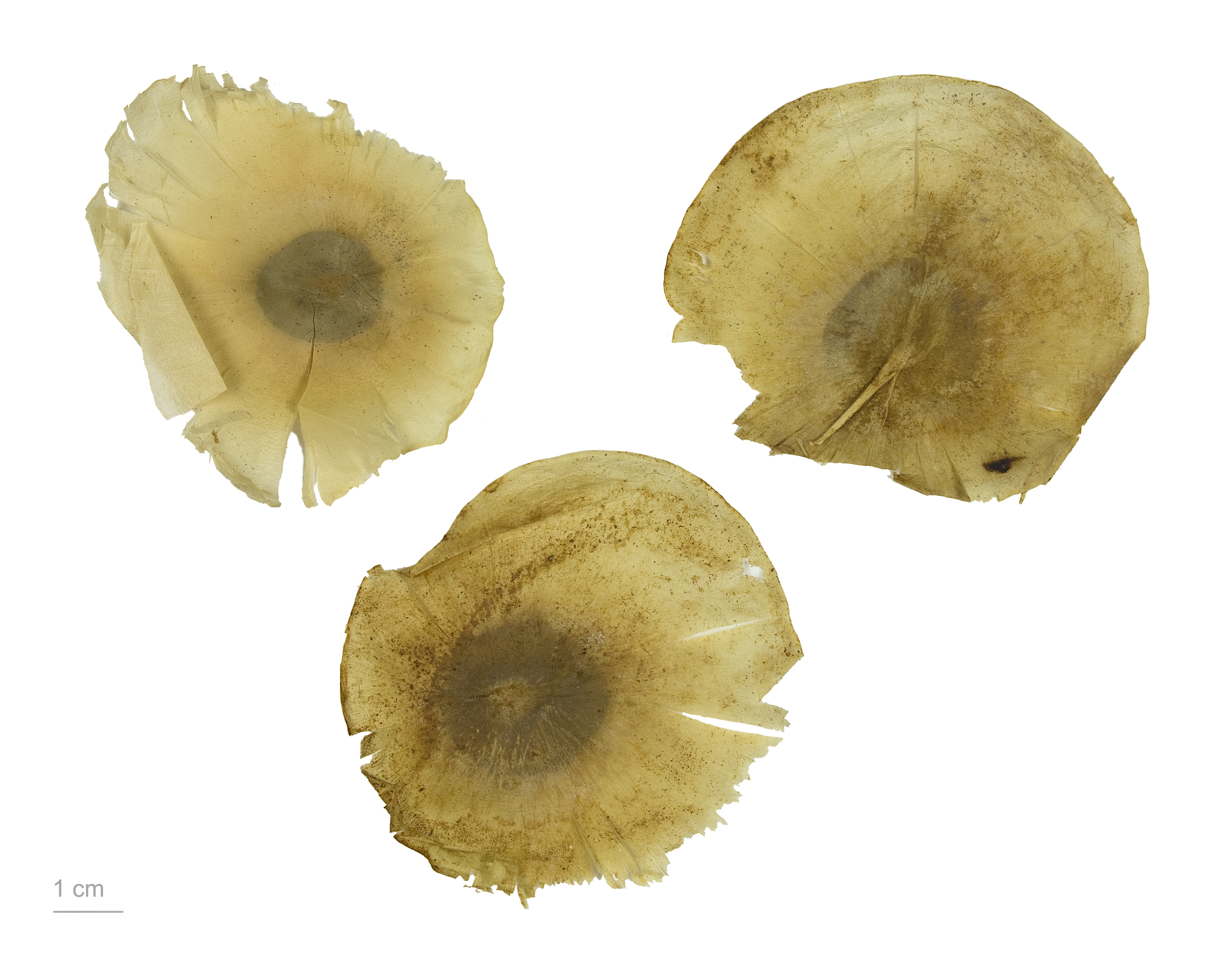
Aspidosperma sp. - MHNT

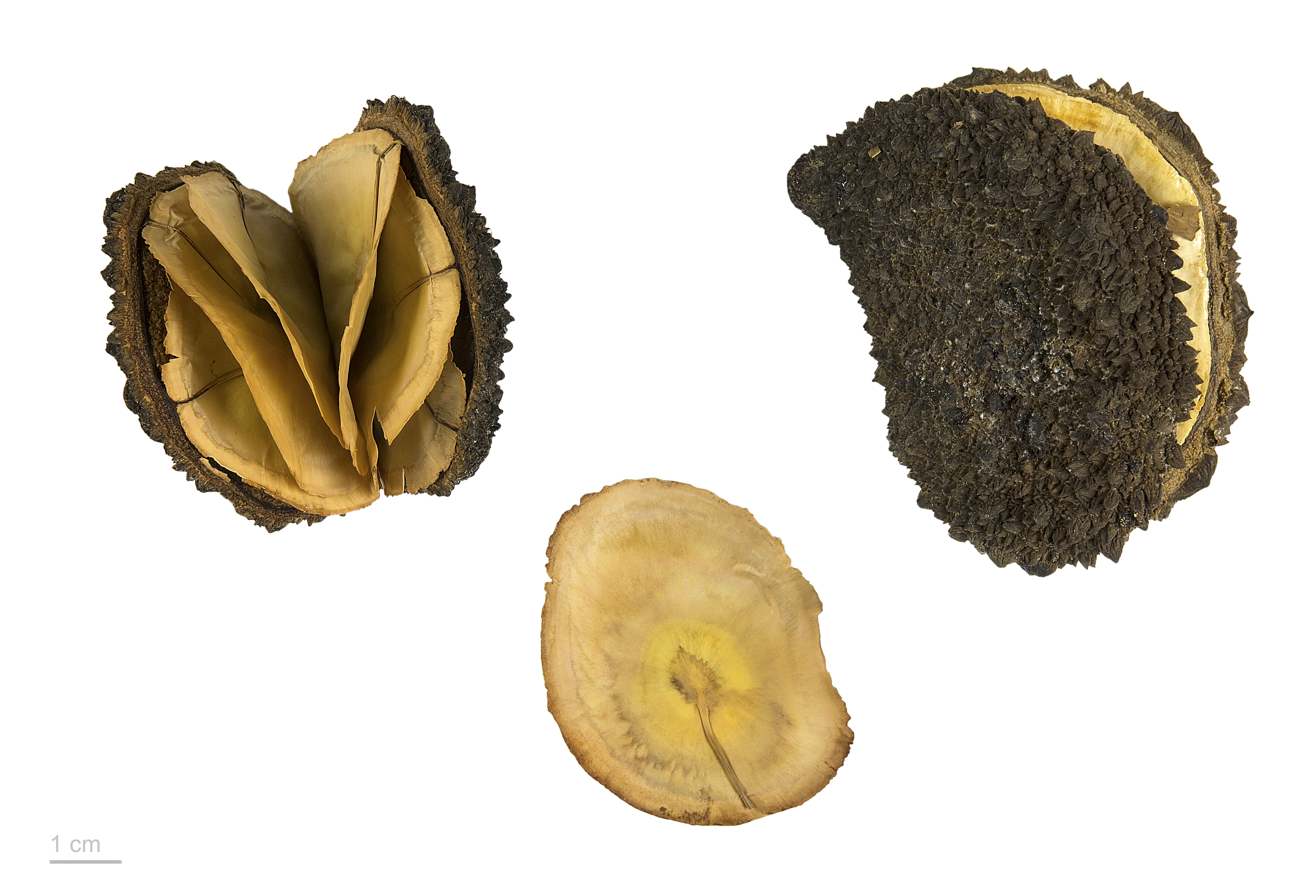
Aspidosperma carapanauba - MHNT

Aspidosperma is a genus of flowering plant in the Dogbane family (Apocynaceae), first described as a genus in 1824. It is native to South America, Central America, southern Mexico, and the West Indies. One Central American species of this genus under the name "Aspidosperma cruenta" (not accepted by POWO) has leaves which have lived for as long as fourteen years on Barro Colorado Island, Panama, and exceeded among dicots only by the Australian tree Doryphora sassafras.

Species

1. Aspidosperma album - Guianas, Venezuela, Colombia, Peru, Brazil
2. Aspidosperma araracanga - Venezuela, Colombia, Peru, NW Brazil
3. Aspidosperma auriculatum - Pará
4. Aspidosperma australe - Brazil, NE Argentina, Paraguay, Bolivia
5. Aspidosperma camporum - S Brazil
6. Aspidosperma capitatum - Colombia, Peru
7. Aspidosperma carapanauba - Brazil, Peru, French Guiana
8. Aspidosperma centrale - Brazil, Colombia
9. Aspidosperma cuspa - Panama, Hispaniola, south to Paraguay
10. Aspidosperma cylindrocarpon - Brazil, Peru, Paraguay, Bolivia
11. Aspidosperma darienense - Panama, N South America
12. Aspidosperma decussatum - Bolívar in Venezuela
13. Aspidosperma desmanthum - from Chiapas to Brazil
14. Aspidosperma discolor - Brazil
15. Aspidosperma dispermum - Serra do Espinhaço in Brazil
16. Aspidosperma eburneum - Brazil
17. Aspidosperma eteanum - NW Brazil
18. Aspidosperma excelsum - from Costa Rica to NW Brazil
19. Aspidosperma fendleri - Venezuela, Guyana
20. Aspidosperma formosanum - Goiás
21. Aspidosperma gehrtii - São Paulo
22. Aspidosperma glaucum - Amazonas in Venezuela
23. Aspidosperma helstonei - Suriname, French Guiana
24. Aspidosperma illustre - E Brazil
25. Aspidosperma inundatum - Amazonas + Pará in Brazil
26. Aspidosperma leucocymosum - Amazonas in Venezuela, Amazonas in Brazil
27. Aspidosperma limae - Pernambuco
28. Aspidosperma macrocarpon - Venezuela, Bolivia, Paraguay, Peru, Brazil
29. Aspidosperma macrophyllum - Guyana, French Guiana
30. Aspidosperma megalocarpon - from Veracruz to N Brazil
31. Aspidosperma megaphyllum - Acre, NE Peru
32. Aspidosperma multiflorum - Brazil, Bolivia
33. Aspidosperma myristicifolia - Costa Rica, Colombia, Ecuador, Peru, Acre
34. Aspidosperma myristicifolium - Brazil, Colombia, Costa Rica, Ecuador, Peru
35. Aspidosperma nanum - Mato Grosso
36. Aspidosperma neblinae - Amazonas in Venezuela
37. Aspidosperma nemorale - S Brazil
38. Aspidosperma nigricans - Paraíba
39. Aspidosperma nobile - Brazil, Bolivia
40. Aspidosperma oblongum - Venezuela, Guianas
41. Aspidosperma obscurinervium - Amazonas in Brazil
42. Aspidosperma olivaceum - S Brazil
43. Aspidosperma pachypterum - Amazonas in Venezuela
44. Aspidosperma parvifolium - Brazil
45. Aspidosperma pichonianum - Bolívar in Venezuela
46. Aspidosperma polyneuron - from Colombia to Paraguay
47. Aspidosperma pyricollum Brazil
48. Aspidosperma pyrifolium - Brazil, Bolivia, Paraguay
49. Aspidosperma quebracho-blanco - Brazil, Bolivia, Paraguay, Argentina, Uruguay
50. Aspidosperma ramiflorum - Brazil, Bolivia
51. Aspidosperma reductum - Paraguay
52. Aspidosperma resonans - Bolivia
53. Aspidosperma riedelii - Brazil, Paraguay
54. Aspidosperma rigidum - from Costa Rica to NW Brazil
55. Aspidosperma salgadense - Pará
56. Aspidosperma sandwithianum Markgr. - Guianas
57. Aspidosperma schultesii - Venezuela, Peru, NW Brazil
58. Aspidosperma spruceanum - Brazil, Bolivia, Peru, Guianas
59. Aspidosperma steinbachii - Bolivia, Northern and West-Central Brazil, Peru
60. Aspidosperma steyermarkii - Bolívar in Venezuela
61. Aspidosperma subincanum - Brazil, Bolivia
62. Aspidosperma thomasii - Bahia
63. Aspidosperma tomentosum - Brazil, Bolivia, Paraguay
64. Aspidosperma triternatum - Paraguay, N. Argentina
65. Aspidosperma ulei - Brazil, Guianas, Venezuela, Colombia
66. Aspidosperma vargasii - Brazil, Guianas, Venezuela (incl Antilles), Colombia
67. Aspidosperma williamii - Amazonas in Brazil
