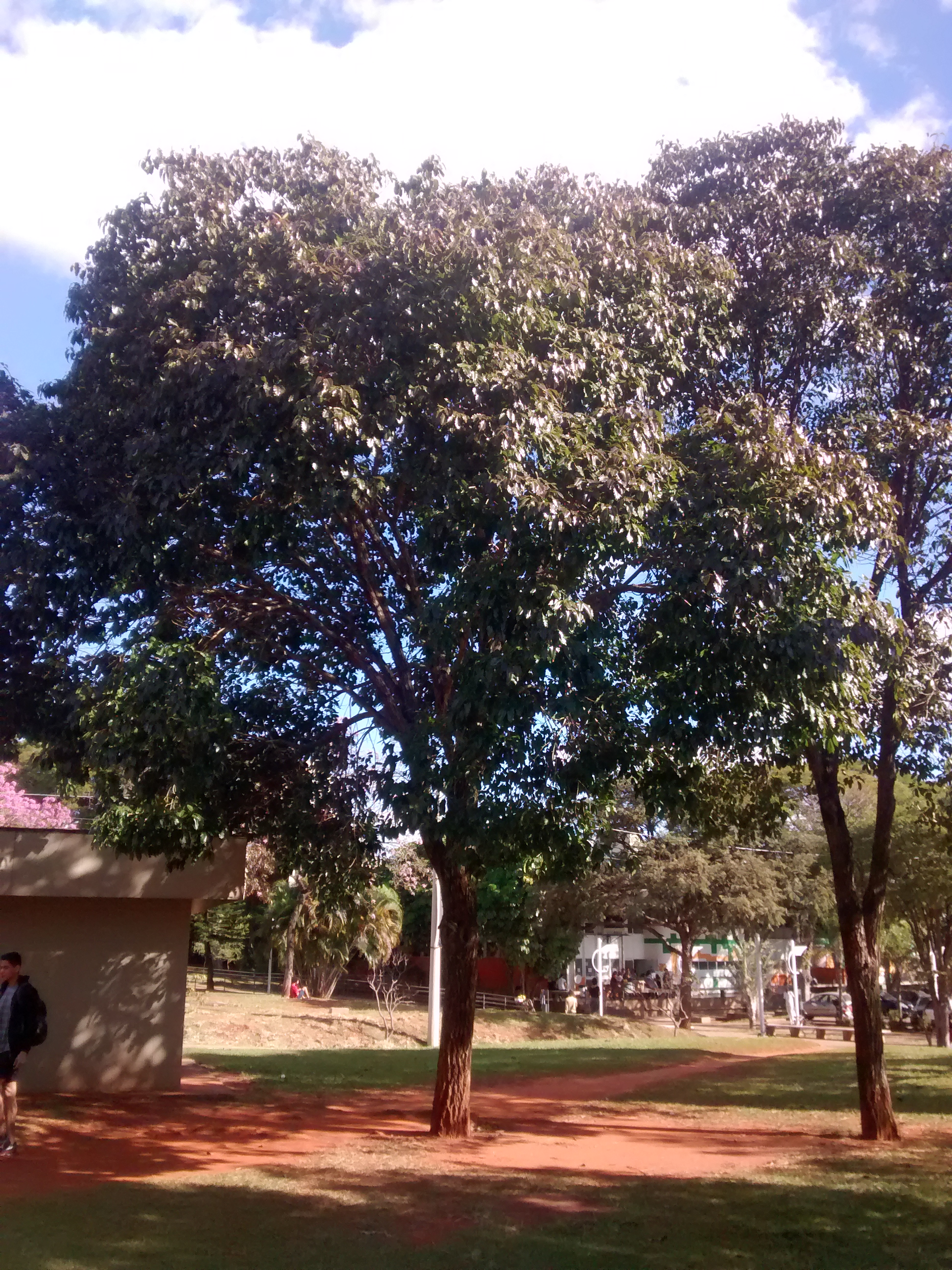

Scientific classification
- Kingdom: Plantae
- Clade: Tracheophytes
- Clade: Angiosperms
- Clade: Eudicots
- Clade: Asterids
- Order: Gentianales
- Family: Apocynaceae
- Genus: Aspidosperma
- Species: A. cylindrocarpon

Binomial name
- Aspidosperma cylindrocarpon Müll.Arg.

Synonyms
- Aspidosperma cylindrocarpon var. genuinumHassl.; Aspidosperma lagoense Müll.Arg.; Aspidosperma brevifolia Rusby

= Aspidosperma cylindrocarpon =

Species of tree

Aspidosperma cylindrocarpon is a timber tree native to Brazil, Paraguay, Bolivia, and Peru. It is common in Atlantic Forest, Cerrado and Pantanal vegetation of Brazil. This plant is cited in Flora Brasiliensis by Carl Friedrich Philipp von Martius. In addition, it is useful for beekeeping.

A number of alkaloids were shown to have existed in Aspidosperma cylindrocarpon, e.g. cylindrocarpine.
