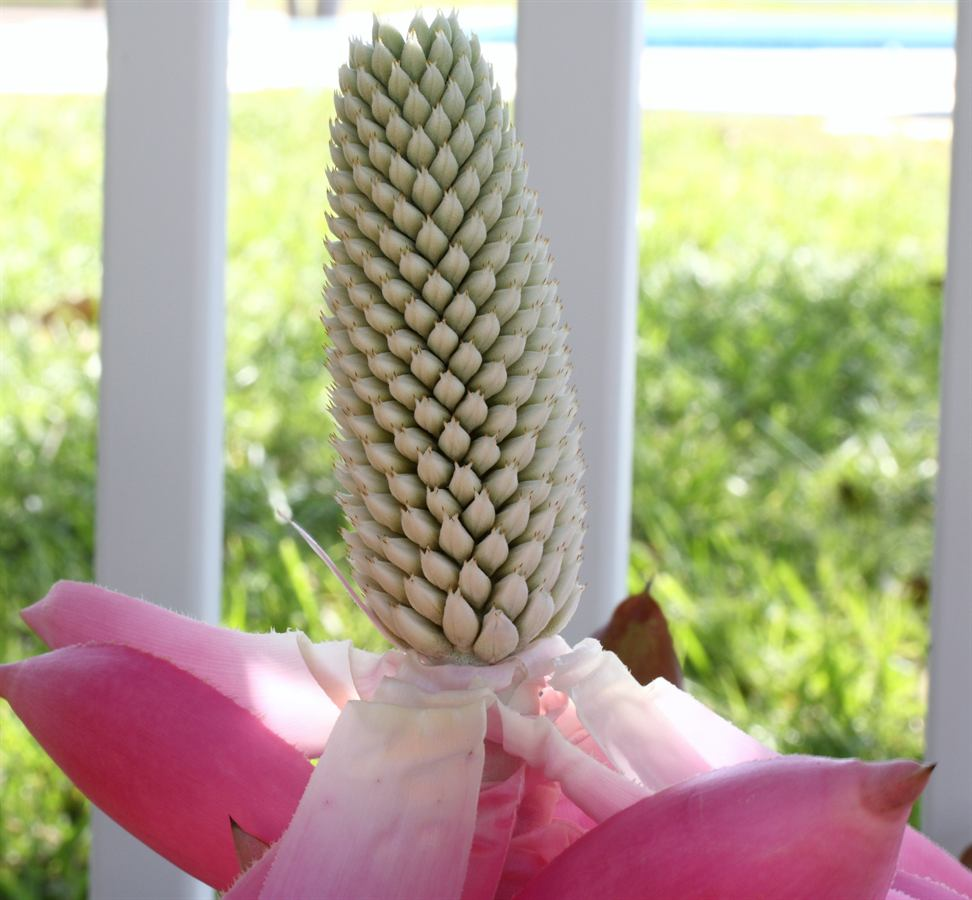

Scientific classification
- Kingdom: Plantae
- Clade: Tracheophytes
- Clade: Angiosperms
- Clade: Monocots
- Clade: Commelinids
- Order: Poales
- Family: Bromeliaceae
- Genus: Aechmea
- Subgenus: Aechmea subg. Pothuava
- Species: A. mariae-reginae

Binomial name
- Aechmea mariae-reginae H.Wendland

Synonyms
- Pothuava mariae-reginae (H.Wendl.) L.B.Sm. & W.J.Kress; Aechmea lalindei Linden & Rodigas; Aechmea gigas E.Morren ex C.H.Wright

= Aechmea mariae-reginae =

Species of flowering plant

Aechmea mariae-reginae is a species in the genus Aechmea. endemic to Central America (Costa Rica, Nicaragua, Honduras). This is one of the few Bromelioideae species that is dioecious, and is the only species in its genus with this trait.

== Cultivars ==
Cultivars include:

- Aechmea 'Jimmie Knight';
- Aechmea 'Maygood Moir';
- Aechmea 'Prince Albert';
- × Androlaechmea 'Dean'.
