= Aechmea triticina =

Scientific classification
- Kingdom: Plantae
- Clade: Embryophytes
- Clade: Tracheophytes
- Clade: Spermatophytes
- Clade: Angiosperms
- Clade: Monocots
- Clade: Commelinids
- Order: Poales
- Family: Bromeliaceae
- Genus: Aechmea
- Subgenus: Aechmea subg. Pothuava
- Species: A. triticina

Binomial name
- Aechmea triticina Mez

Synonyms
- Homotypic Synonyms: Pothuava triticina (Mez) L.B.Sm. & W.J.Kress; Heterotypic Synonyms: Aechmea pineliana var. minuta M.B.Foster; Pothuava pineliana var. minuta (M.B.Foster) L.B.Sm. & W.J.Kress

Species of flowering plant

Aechmea triticina is a species of flowering plant in the family Bromeliaceae.This species is endemic to eastern Brazil, known from the States of Espírito Santo and Rio de Janeiro.
