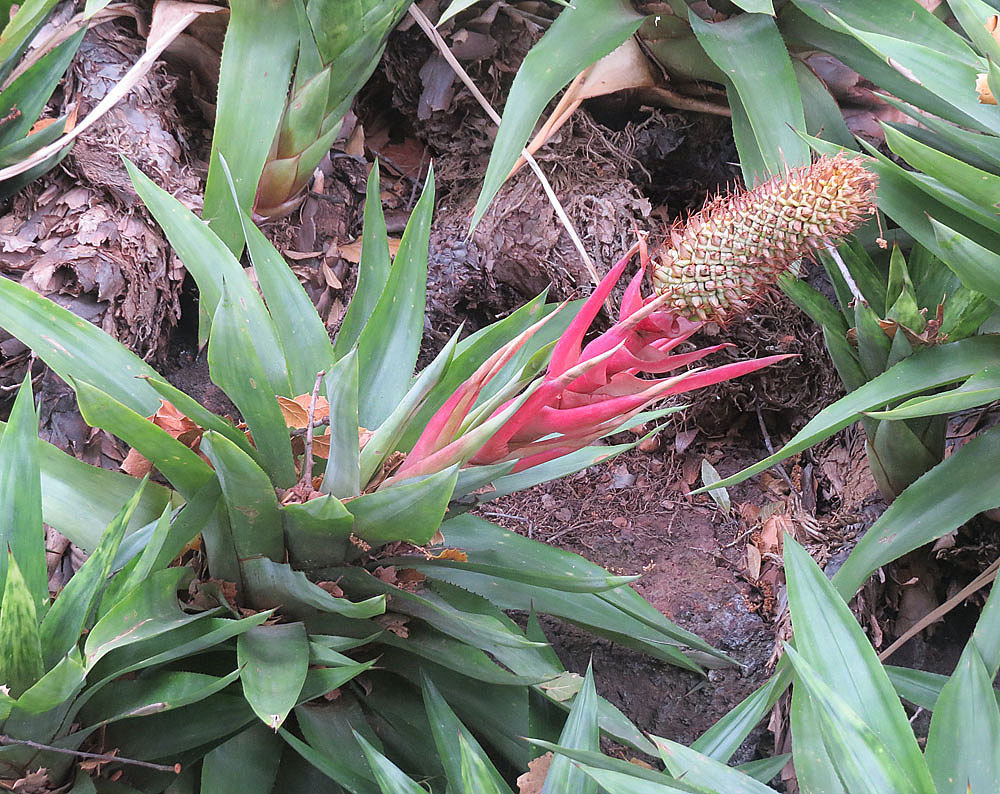

Scientific classification
- Kingdom: Plantae
- Clade: Tracheophytes
- Clade: Angiosperms
- Clade: Monocots
- Clade: Commelinids
- Order: Poales
- Family: Bromeliaceae
- Genus: Aechmea
- Subgenus: Aechmea subg. Pothuava
- Species: A. ornata

Binomial name
- Aechmea ornata (Gaudich.) Baker

Synonyms
- Chevaliera ornata Gaudich.; Pothuava ornata (Gaudich.) L.B.Sm. & W.J.Kress; Aechmea hystrix E.Morren; Echinostachys hystrix (E.Morren) Wittm.

= Aechmea ornata =

Species of plant

Aechmea ornata is a species of flowering plant in the Bromeliaceae family. It is endemic to southern Brazil from Rio de Janeiro State south to Santa Catarina.
