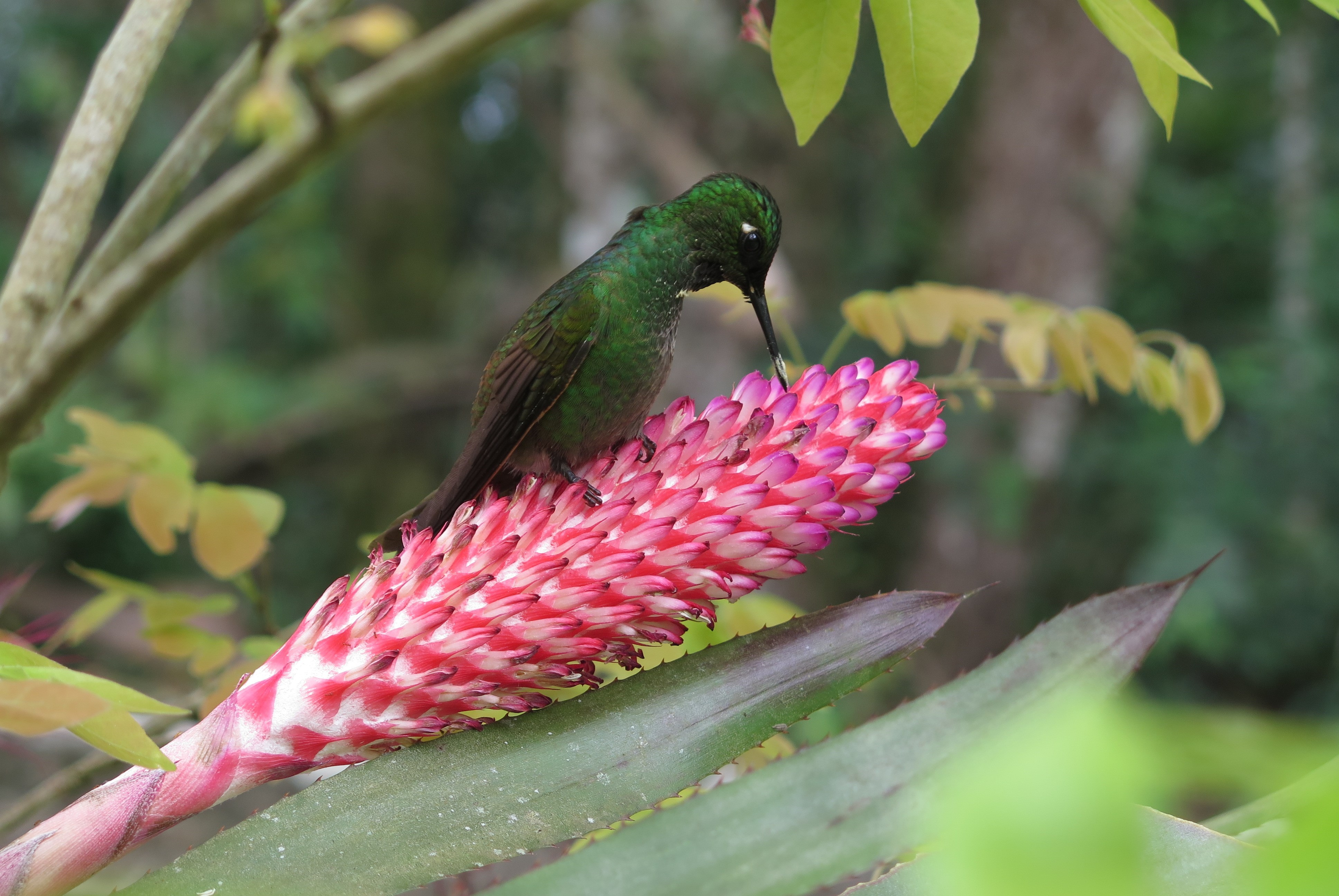

Scientific classification
- Kingdom: Plantae
- Clade: Tracheophytes
- Clade: Angiosperms
- Clade: Monocots
- Clade: Commelinids
- Order: Poales
- Family: Bromeliaceae
- Genus: Aechmea
- Subgenus: Aechmea subg. Pothuava
- Species: A. vanhoutteana

Binomial name
- Aechmea vanhoutteana (Van Houtte) Mez

= Aechmea vanhoutteana =

Species of flowering plant

Aechmea vanhoutteana is a plant species in the genus Aechmea. This species is endemic to Brazil.
