= Aechmea bocainensis =

Scientific classification
- Kingdom: Plantae
- Clade: Tracheophytes
- Clade: Angiosperms
- Clade: Monocots
- Clade: Commelinids
- Order: Poales
- Family: Bromeliaceae
- Genus: Aechmea
- Subgenus: Aechmea subg. Pothuava
- Species: A. bocainensis

Binomial name
- Aechmea bocainensis E.Pereira & Leme

Synonyms
- Pothuava bocainensis (E.Pereira & Leme) L.B.Sm. & W.J.Kress

Species of flowering plant

Aechmea bocainensis is a species of plant in the genus Aechmea. This species is endemic to Brazil, found in the States of Rio de Janeiro and São Paulo.
