= Aechmea cathcartii =

Scientific classification
- Kingdom: Plantae
- Clade: Tracheophytes
- Clade: Angiosperms
- Clade: Monocots
- Clade: Commelinids
- Order: Poales
- Family: Bromeliaceae
- Genus: Aechmea
- Subgenus: Aechmea subg. Pothuava
- Species: A. cathcartii

Binomial name
- Aechmea cathcartii C.F. Reed & R.W. Read

Synonyms
- Lamprococcus cathcartii (C.F.Reed & Read) L.B.Sm. & W.J.Kress

Species of flowering plant

Aechmea cathcartii is a plant species in the genus Aechmea. This species is endemic to the Miranda region of Venezuela.
