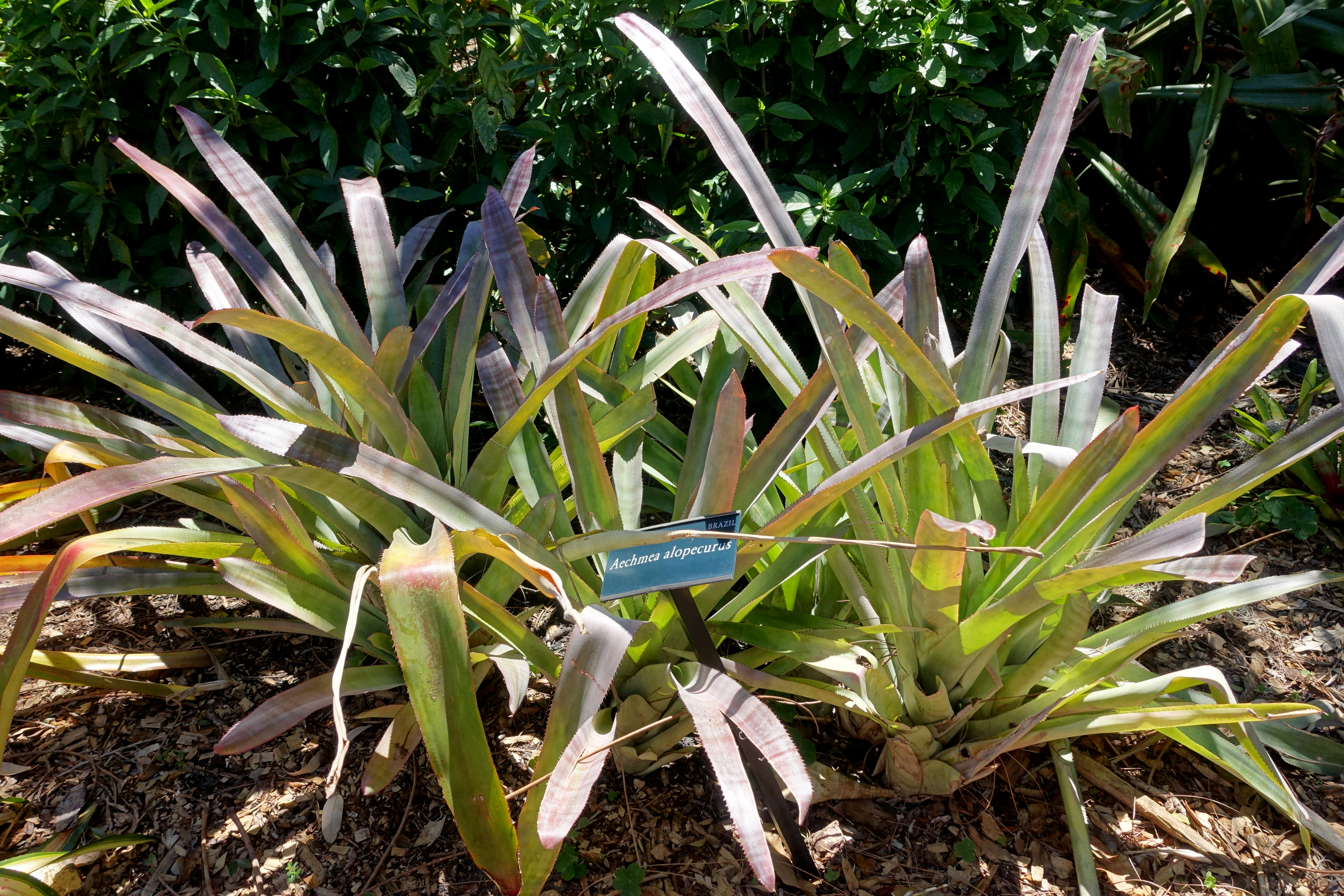

Scientific classification
- Kingdom: Plantae
- Clade: Embryophytes
- Clade: Tracheophytes
- Clade: Spermatophytes
- Clade: Angiosperms
- Clade: Monocots
- Clade: Commelinids
- Order: Poales
- Family: Bromeliaceae
- Genus: Aechmea
- Subgenus: Aechmea subg. Pothuava
- Species: A. alopecurus

Binomial name
- Aechmea alopecurus Mez

Synonyms
- Pothuava alopecurus (Mez) L.B.Sm. & W.J.Kress

= Aechmea alopecurus =

Species of flowering plant

Aechmea alopecurus is a species of flowering plant in the family Bromeliaceae. It is endemic to Brazil, known only from the States of Bahia and Minas Gerais.
