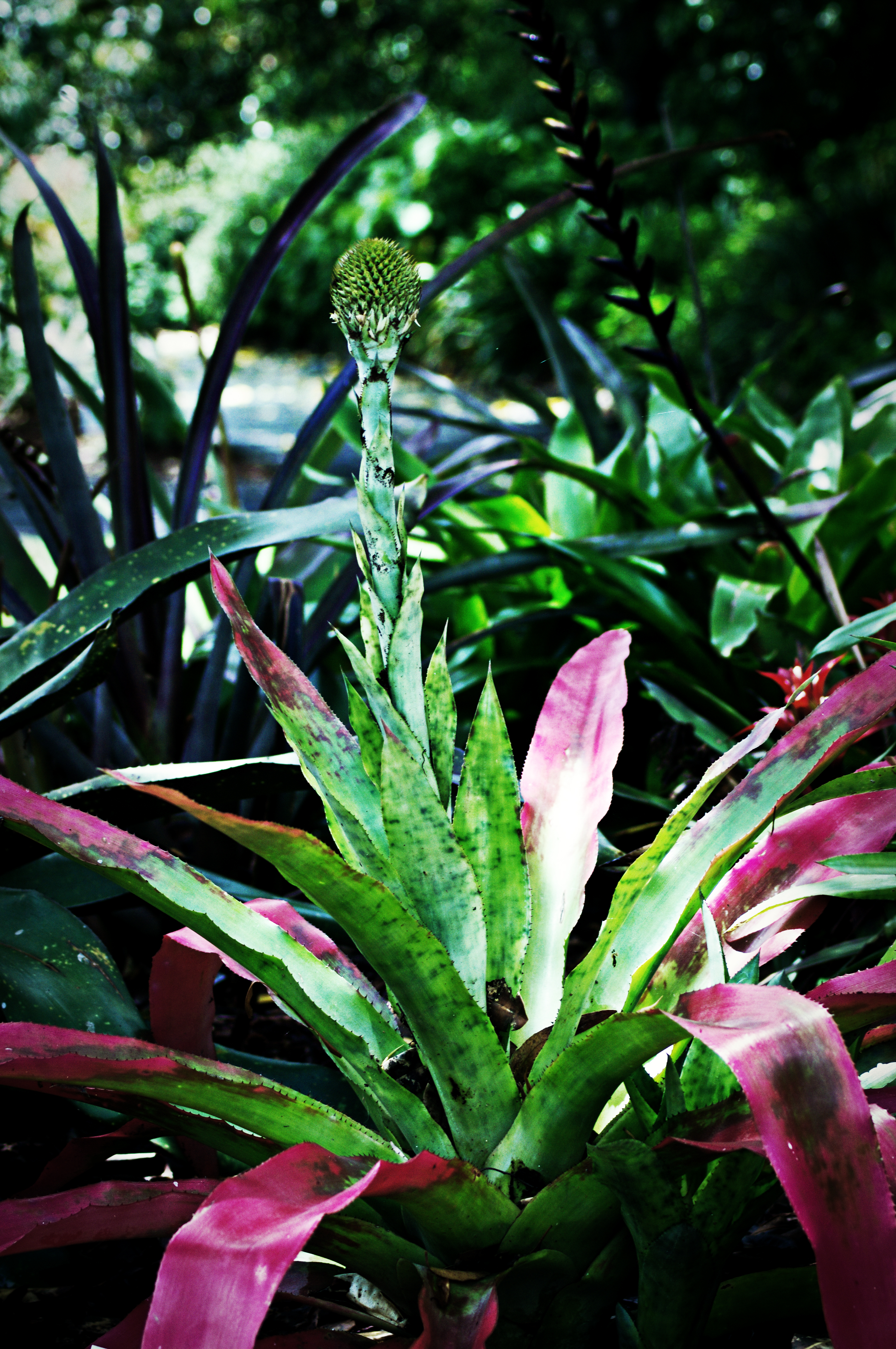

Scientific classification
- Kingdom: Plantae
- Clade: Tracheophytes
- Clade: Angiosperms
- Clade: Monocots
- Clade: Commelinids
- Order: Poales
- Family: Bromeliaceae
- Genus: Aechmea
- Subgenus: Aechmea subg. Pothuava
- Species: A. pectinata

Binomial name
- Aechmea pectinata Baker

Synonyms
- Pothuava pectinata (Baker) L.B.Sm. & W.J.Kress; Chevaliera crocophylla E.Morren; Aechmea crocophylla (E.Morren) Baker; Aechmea armata Lindm.

= Aechmea pectinata =

Species of flowering plant

Aechmea pectinata is a species of flowering plant in the Bromeliaceae (bromeliad) family. This primarily epiphytic species is endemic to the Southeast Region of Brazil, from Rio de Janeiro State south to Paraná and Santa Catarina. It is known from the regions in and around Petrópolis (slightly north of Rio) and south, mainly along the coast, through Bertioga, São Paulo and Curitiba, including Carlos Botelho State Park, Serra dos Órgãos National Park and Tinguá Biological Reserve. A. pectinata is also known as growing within Lagamar de Cananéia State Park, Cairuçu Environmental Protection Area, Cachoeiro de Itapemirim, and Superagüi National Park.
