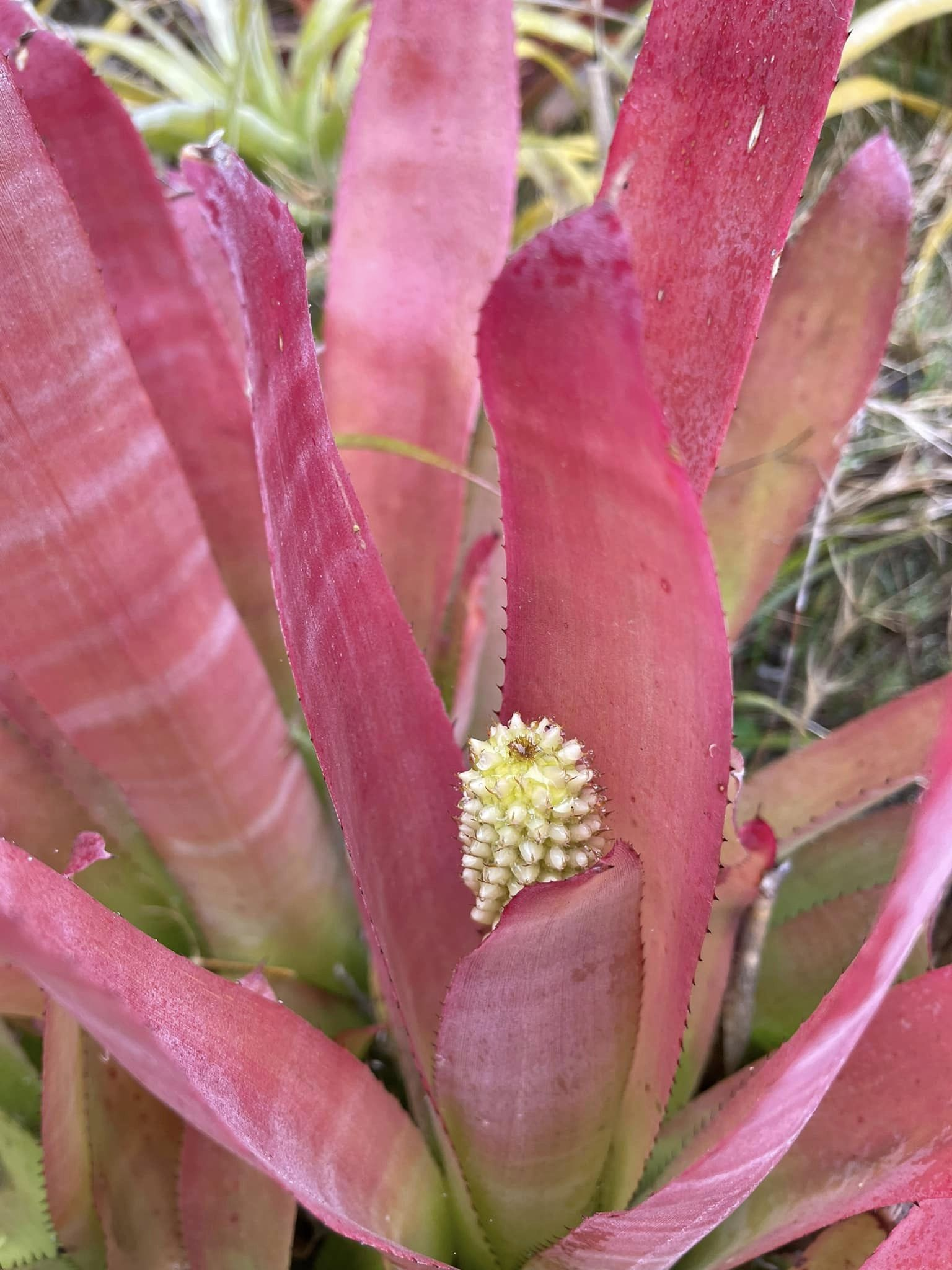
- Aechmea roberto-seidelii blooming

Scientific classification
- Kingdom: Plantae
- Clade: Tracheophytes
- Clade: Angiosperms
- Clade: Monocots
- Clade: Commelinids
- Order: Poales
- Family: Bromeliaceae
- Genus: Aechmea
- Subgenus: Aechmea subg. Pothuava
- Species: A. roberto-seidelii

Binomial name
- Aechmea roberto-seidelii E.Pereira

Synonyms
- Aechmea guaraparaiensis E.Pereira & Leme; Pothuava guaraparaiensis (E.Pereira & Leme) L.B.Sm. & W.J.Kress

= Aechmea roberto-seidelii =

Species of flowering plant

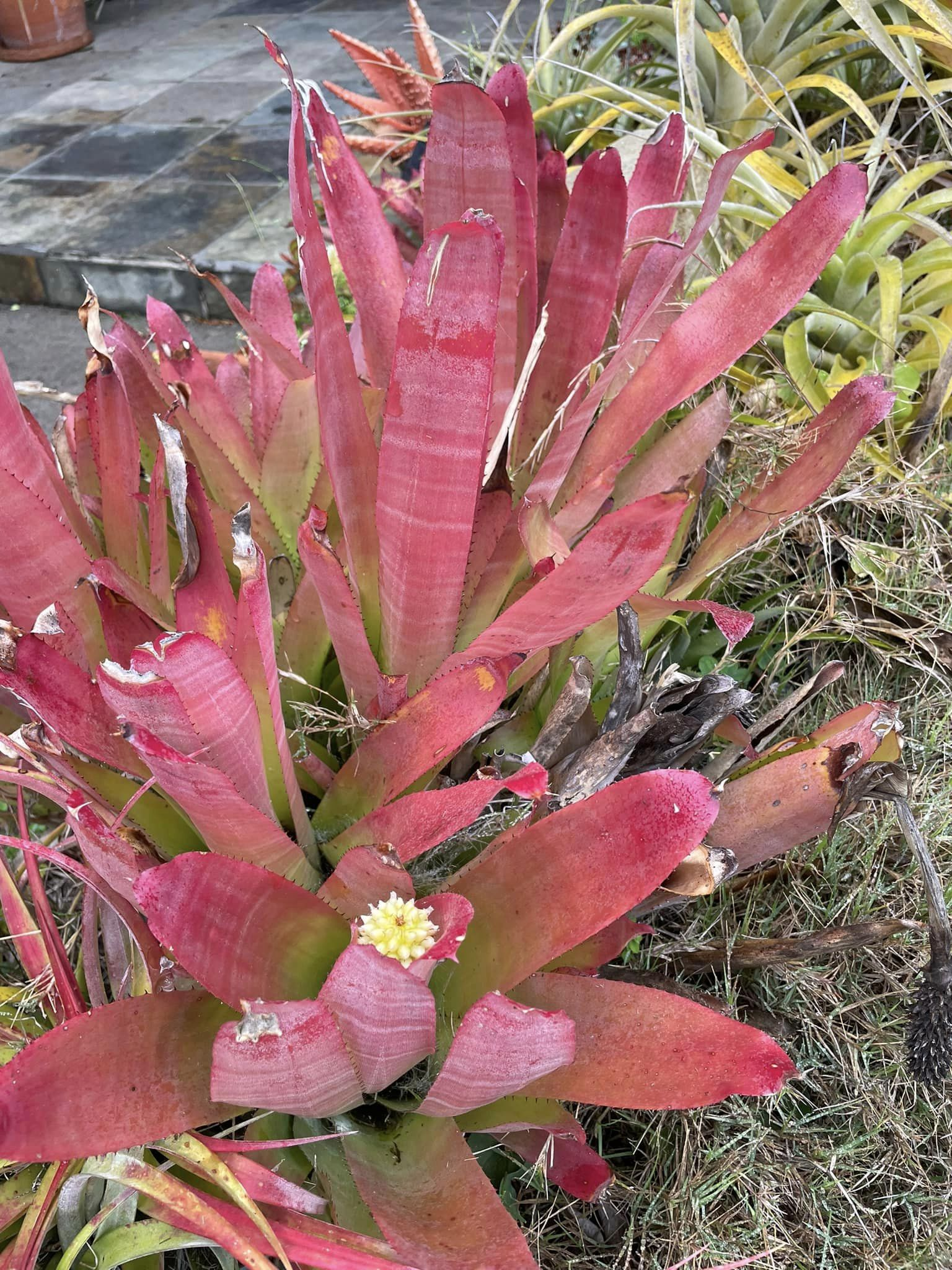
Aechmea roberto-seidelii cluster growing in Ventura, Calif.

Aechmea roberto-seidelii is a plant species in the genus Aechmea. This species is endemic to the State of Espírito Santo in eastern Brazil.
