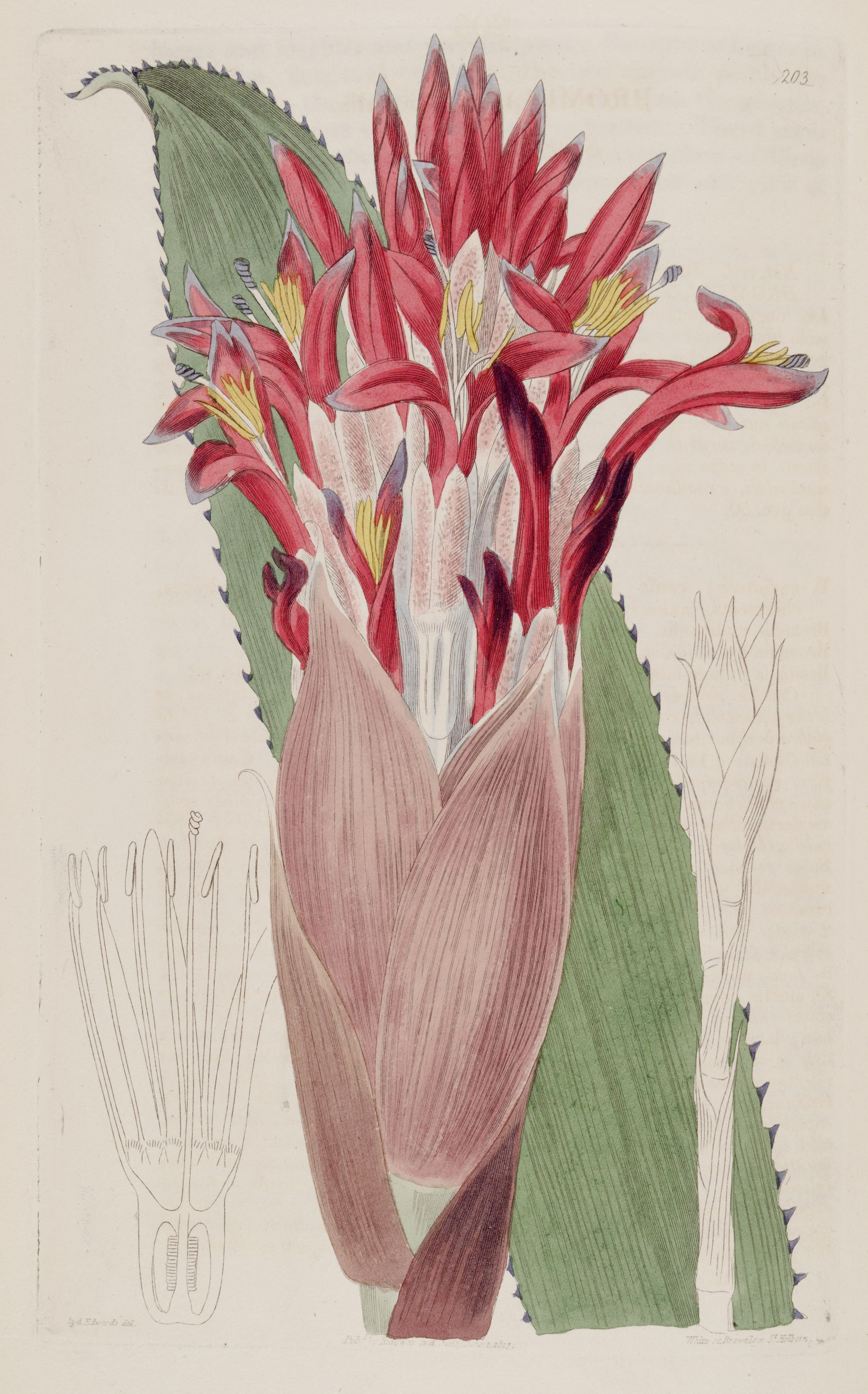
- 1817 illustration

Scientific classification
- Kingdom: Plantae
- Clade: Tracheophytes
- Clade: Angiosperms
- Clade: Monocots
- Clade: Commelinids
- Order: Poales
- Family: Bromeliaceae
- Genus: Aechmea
- Subgenus: Aechmea subg. Pothuava
- Species: A. nudicaulis

Binomial name
- Aechmea nudicaulis Griseb.

Synonyms
- Bromelia nudicaulis L.; Billbergia nudicaulis (L.) Lindl.; Hoplophytum nudicaule (L.) K.Koch; Hohenbergia nudicaulis (L.) Baker; Pothuava nudicaulis (L.) Regel; Tillandsia saxatilis Vell.; Billbergia lutea Schult. & Schult.f.; Bromelia gigantea Schult. & Schult.f.; Billbergia lanuginosa K.Koch; Billbergia pyramidata Beer; Hoplophytum lanuginosum (K.Koch) Beer; Billbergia aureorosea Baker; Billbergia quadricolor C.Chev.

= Aechmea nudicaulis =

Species of flowering plant

Aechmea nudicaulis is a bromeliad species in the genus Aechmea, which is often used as an ornamental plant. This species is native to Central America, the West Indies, central and southern Mexico, and northern and central South America.

The following varieties are recognized :

1. Aechmea nudicaulis var. aequalis L.B.Sm. & Reitz, 1963 - Espírito Santo
2. Aechmea nudicaulis var. cuspidata Baker, 1879 - Brazil, Guyana, Venezuela, Ecuador
3. Aechmea nudicaulis var. nordestina J.A. Siqueira & Leme, 2006 - northeastern Brazil
4. Aechmea nudicaulis var. nudicaulis - most of species range

A number of cultivars derived from this species are commercially available. These are either selected forms, or hybrids arising from crosses with other species, including:

- Aechmea 'Parati'
- Aechmea 'Rakete'
