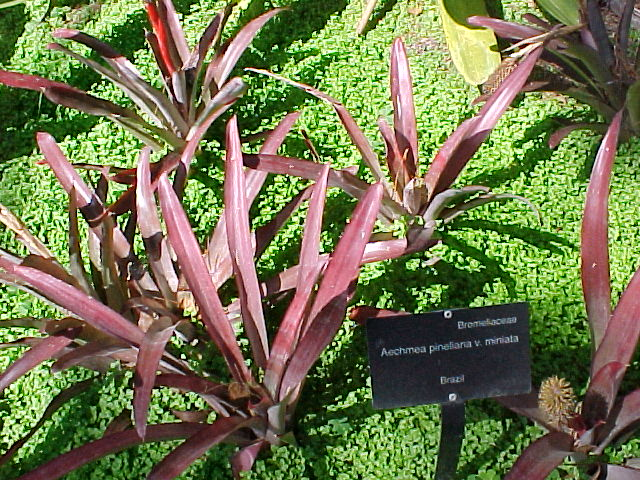

Scientific classification
- Kingdom: Plantae
- Clade: Tracheophytes
- Clade: Angiosperms
- Clade: Monocots
- Clade: Commelinids
- Order: Poales
- Family: Bromeliaceae
- Genus: Aechmea
- Subgenus: Aechmea subg. Pothuava
- Species: A. pineliana

Binomial name
- Aechmea pineliana (Brongn. ex Planch.) Baker

Synonyms
- Echinostachys pineliana Brongn. ex Planch.; Macrochordion pinelianum (Brongn. ex Planch.) Lem.; Pothuava pineliana (Brongn. ex Planch.) L.B.Sm. & W.J.Kress; Echinostachys rosea Beer; Aechmea triticina var. capensis L.B.Sm.; Pothuava triticina var. capensis (L.B.Sm.) L.B.Sm. & W.J.Kress

= Aechmea pineliana =

Species of plant

Aechmea pineliana is a flowering plant in the family Bromeliaceae. It is typical of Atlantic Forest vegetation in Brazil, specially in following states: Espírito Santo, Minas Gerais, and Rio de Janeiro. This plant is cited in Flora Brasiliensis by Carl Friedrich Philipp von Martius, and it is often used as an ornamental plant.
