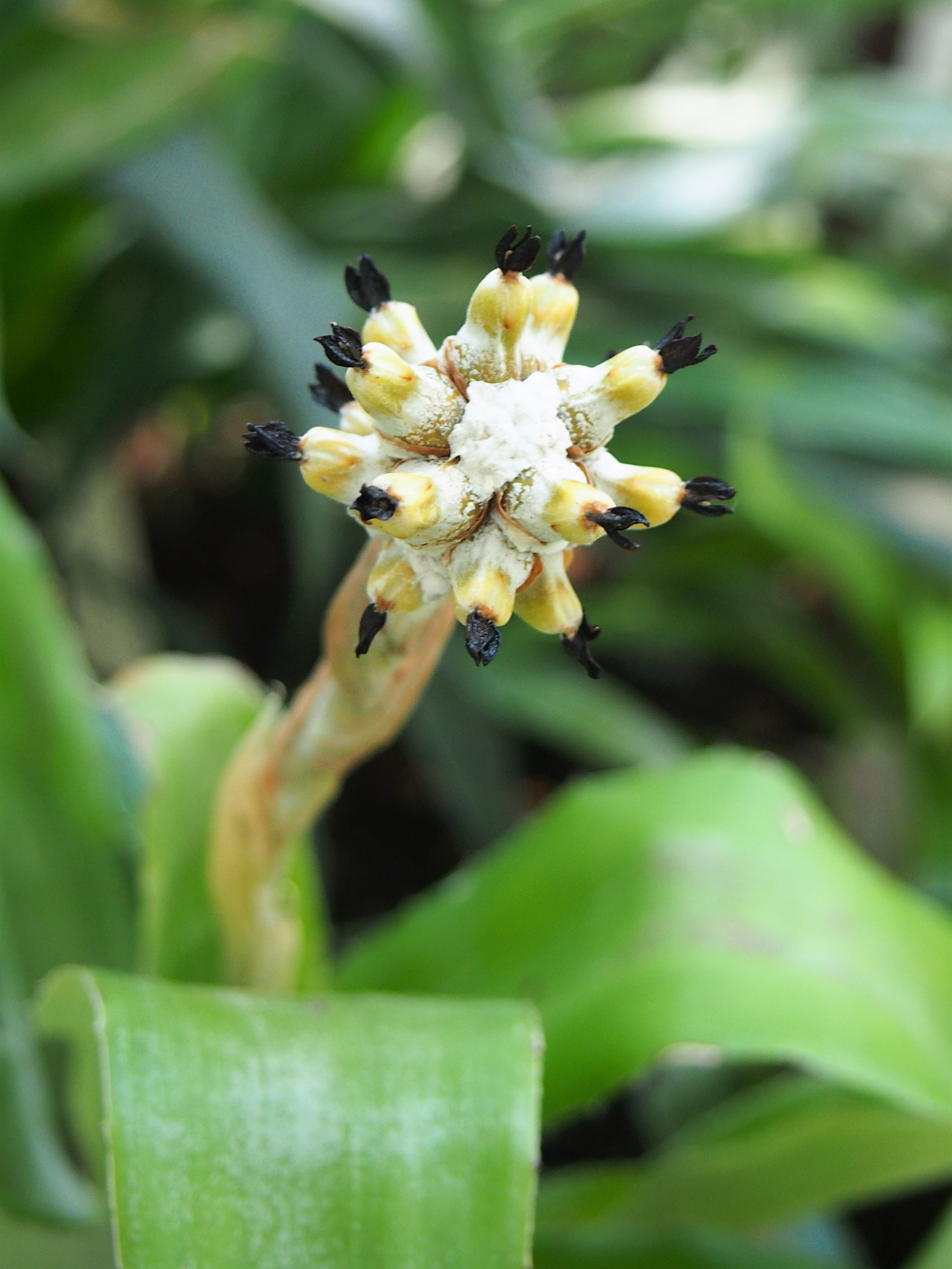
- Aechmea squarrosa

Scientific classification
- Kingdom: Plantae
- Clade: Tracheophytes
- Clade: Angiosperms
- Clade: Monocots
- Clade: Commelinids
- Order: Poales
- Family: Bromeliaceae
- Genus: Aechmea
- Subgenus: Aechmea subg. Pothuava
- Species: A. squarrosa

Binomial name
- Aechmea squarrosa Baker

Synonyms
- Pothuava squarrosa (Baker) L.B.Sm. & W.J.Kress

= Aechmea squarrosa =

Species of flowering plant

Aechmea squarrosa is a species of flowering plant in the Bromeliaceae family'. This species is endemic to the State of Rio de Janeiro in southeastern Brazil.
