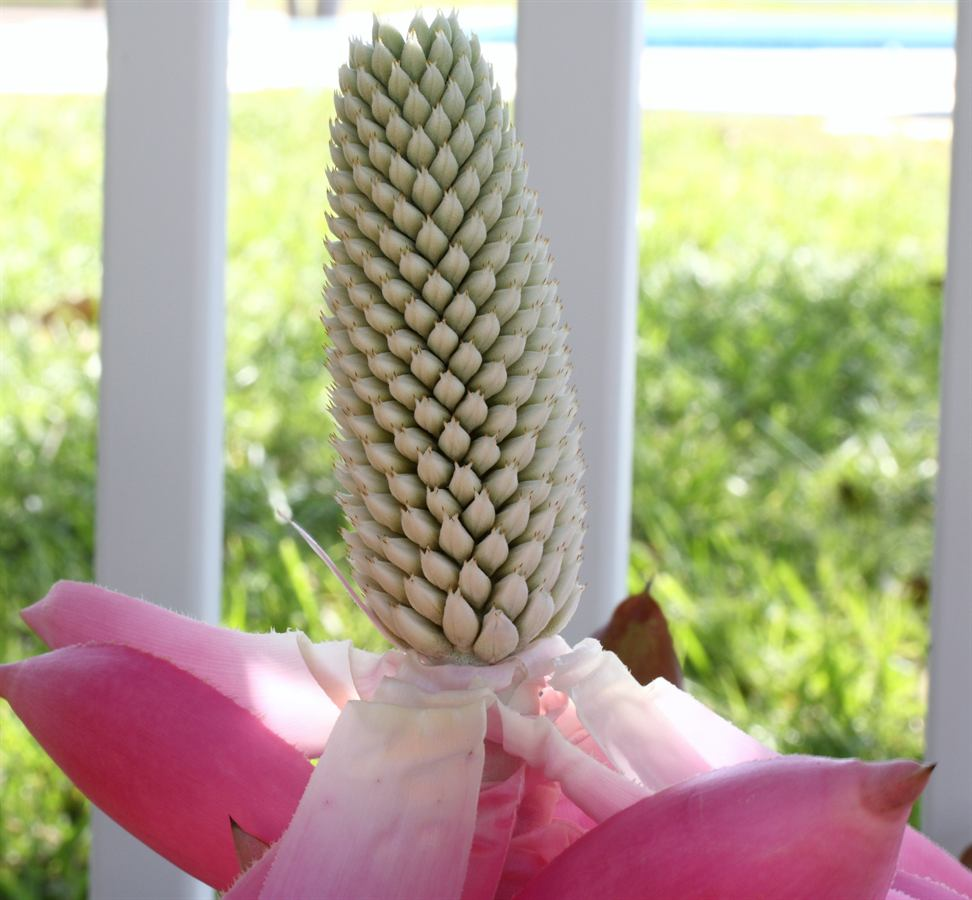
- Male flower of Aechmea mariae-reginae

Scientific classification
- Kingdom: Plantae
- Clade: Tracheophytes
- Clade: Angiosperms
- Clade: Monocots
- Clade: Commelinids
- Order: Poales
- Family: Bromeliaceae
- Genus: Aechmea
- Subgenus: Aechmea subg. Pothuava (Baker) Baker

Species
- See text

= Aechmea subg. Pothuava =

Subgenus of flowering plants

Pothuava is a subgenus of the genus Aechmea.

== Species ==
Species accepted by Encyclopedia of Bromeliads as of October 2022:

Image	Scientific name	Distribution
	Aechmea alopecurus Mez	Brazil (Bahia and Minas Gerais)
	Aechmea bocainensis Pereira & Leme	Brazil (Rio de Janeiro and São Paulo)
	Aechmea bruggeri Leme	Brazil.
	Aechmea cathcartii C.F.Reed & Read	Miranda region of Venezuela.
	Aechmea lilacinantha Leme	Brazil (Rio de Janeiro)
	Aechmea mariae-reginae H.Wendl	Costa Rica, Nicaragua, Honduras
	Aechmea nudicaulis (L.) Griseb.	central and southern Mexico, and northern and central South America
	Aechmea ornata Baker	Brazil(Rio de Janeiro State south to Santa Catarina)
	Aechmea pectinata Baker	Brazil ( Rio de Janeiro State south to Santa Catarina)
	Aechmea pineliana (Brongn. ex Planch.) Baker	Brazil(Espírito Santo, Minas Gerais, and Rio de Janeiro.)
	Aechmea roberto-anselmoi Pereira & Leme	Brazil (Rio de Janeiro)
	Aechmea roberto-seidelii E.Pereira	Brazil (Espírito Santo)
	Aechmea rubroaristata Leme & Fraga	Brazil (Santa Catarina)
	Aechmea squarrosa Baker	Brazil ( Rio de Janeiro)
	Aechmea triticina Mez	Brazil (Espírito Santo and Rio de Janeiro.)
	Aechmea vanhoutteana (Van Houtte) Mez	Brazil.
