= Caespitotheca =

Scientific classification
- Kingdom: Fungi
- Division: Ascomycota
- Class: Leotiomycetes
- Order: Helotiales
- Family: Erysiphaceae
- Genus: Caespitotheca; S. Takam. & U. Braun, 2005
- Species: C. forestalis

Binomial name
- Caespitotheca forestalis (Mena) S. Takam. & U. Braun, 2005

Synonyms
- Uncinula forestalis Mena, 1970; Erysiphe forestalis (Mena) U. Braun & S. Takamatsu, 2000

Monotypic genus of fungi

Caespitotheca is a genus of fungi in the family Erysiphaceae. The monotypic genus contains the single species Caespitotheca forestalis, which forms powdery mildew on leaves of plants in the genus Schinopsis.

== Description ==
The fungus forms superficial, white irregular patches, at first thin and effuse but later becoming dense, tomentose and persistent, on the leaves of its host. Like most powdery mildew species, Caespitotheca forestalis is highly host-specific and only infects a few species in the genus Schinopsis. This species is found wherever its hosts are in South America. The type specimen was collected in Argentina on Schinopsis balansae. This species has also been recorded from Schinopsis haenkeana, and Schinopsis lorentzii.

== Taxonomy ==
The fungus was formally described in 1970 by Mena with the basionym Uncinula forestalis. The species was transferred to the genus Erysiphe by Braun and Takamatsu in 2000, before the same authors placed it in the monotypic genus Caespitotheca in 2005. The genus Caespitotheca is morphologically and phylogenetically isolated from much of the rest of the Erysiphaceae, and similarly to Parauncinula it occupies a basal position in the phylogenetic tree of the family. It is thought to have diverged from the rest of the family between 90 and 80 million years ago. Takamatsu (2012) theorised that the ancestors of both Caespitotheca and the other basal genus of the Erysiphaceae, Parauncinula, originated in high latitudes of the Northern Hemisphere and migrated southwards alongside their host species. Caespitotheca would have survived multiple extinction events, and now remains as a relict population in South America, while Parauncinula is found only in East Asia. Both genera also only infect woody plants, which indicates that the first powdery mildew species evolved with woody plants, before later branching off to infect herbs and forbs.

== Micromorphology ==
=== Description ===
The primary mycelium is hyaline, septate and branched with thin walls. The secondary mycelium is composed of long smooth hyphae, almost hyaline to yellowish with thick walls. This bears numerous straight, hyaline, aseptate special aerial hyphae with thin walls. The hyphal appressoria are described as multilobed to coral-like. Conidophores produce catanescent conidia; immature chains have crenulate edge lines. The conidia are subcylindrical to ellipsoid and almost hyaline to yellowish. The chasmothecia (fruiting bodies) are formed in winter and are subglobose with 10–25 rather long appendages in the upper half, which have uncinate to circinate tips. It has been suggested that this appendage shape with uncinate-circinate tips is the most ancestral in the Erysiphaceae, and the fact that it can be found in both Caespitotheca and Parauncinula appears to support this claim. The peridium of the chasmothecia is multilayered and pigmented with cells of irregular shape. Caespitotheca forestalis has six to eight spores per ascus which are roughly ellipsoid and colourless. The asci are typically clavate or saccate and are either sessile or short-stalked.

=== Measurements ===
Hyphal cells measure 29–82.5 × 2.5–6.5 μm. Special aerial hyphae of the secondary mycelium measure 220–780 × 5 μm. Conidiophores are 35–110 × 7.5–12.5 μm with foot cells that may increase in width from base to top, measuring 25–40 × 6–9 μm. Conidia are 27.5–65 × 12–22.5 μm. The chasmothecia are (95–)100–180(–190) μm in diameter with peridium cells 8–20 μm in diameter. Appendages are up to 10× the diameter of the chasmothecia and 4.5–11 μm wide. Asci number 5–10 and are 60–130 × (30–)40–75 μm with ascospores measuring 12.5–37 × 12–23 μm.
