= Astrothelium pyrenuliforme =

Scientific classification
- Kingdom: Fungi
- Division: Ascomycota
- Class: Dothideomycetes
- Order: Trypetheliales
- Family: Trypetheliaceae
- Genus: Astrothelium
- Species: A. pyrenuliforme

Binomial name
- Astrothelium pyrenuliforme Flakus & Aptroot (2016)

Species of lichen

Astrothelium pyrenuliforme is a species of corticolous (bark-dwelling) lichen in the family Trypetheliaceae. Found in Bolivia, it was formally described as a new species in 2016 by lichenologists Adam Flakus and André Aptroot. The type specimen was collected by the first author from Kaa-Iya del Gran Chaco National Park and Integrated Management Natural Area (Cordillera Province, Santa Cruz Department) at an altitude of 340 m (1,120 ft), where it was found growing on bark in a Chiquitano dry forest. It is only known to occur at the type locality. The species epithet pyrenuliforme refers to its resemblance to genus Pyrenula.
