= Quebracho tree =

Different trees

Quebracho [keˈβɾatʃo] is a common name in Spanish to describe very hard (density 0.9–1.3) wood tree species. The etymology of the name derived from quiebrahacha, or quebrar hacha, meaning "axe-breaker". The corresponding English-language term for such hardwoods is breakax or breakaxe.

== Species ==
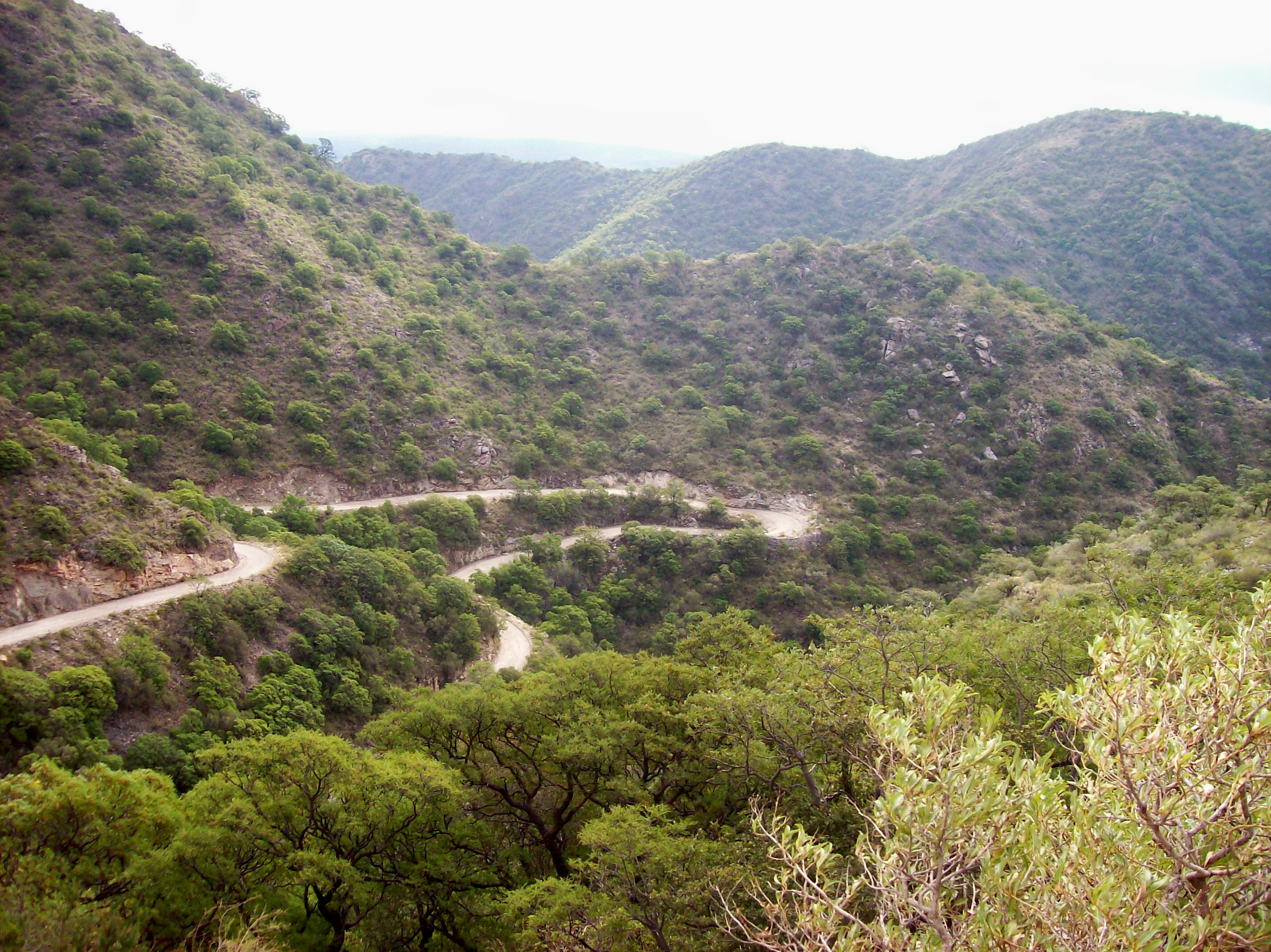
Quebracho colorado bushes in Córdoba province in Argentina

There are at least three similar commercially important tree species that grow in the Gran Chaco region of South America.

- the quebracho
  - Schinopsis lorentzii (Syn.: Schinopsis marginata Engl., Schinopsis haenkeana Engl.); of the family Anacardiaceae; North Argentina, Paraguay and Bolivia; (the red quebracho, quebracho), quebracho-colorado santiagueño, red quebracho santiagueño, quebracho santiagueño (also known as quebracho cor(o)nillo, cor(o)nillo, quebracho macho, quebracho negro or moro, quebracho rojo, quebracho bolí, horco quebracho, quebracho serrano, quebracho montano, quebracho crespo, quebracho del cerro, quebracho colorado de las sierras o del cerro and quebracho cordobés)
  - Schinopsis balansae; of the same family; Northeast Argentina, West-Central Brazil, Paraguay; (the willow-leaf red quebracho, red quebracho) quebracho-colorado chaqueño, red quebracho chaqueño, quebracho chaqueño, quebracho vermelho, quebracho vermelho chaqueño (also known as quebracho hembra or femea, quebracho santafesino, quebracho colorado santafesino, quebracho rubio)
- Schinopsis aff. heterophylla Ragonese & J.A.Castigl., the quebracho mestizo or quebracho colorado mestizo, horco quebracho; Northeast Argentina, Paraguay
- Schinopsis brasiliensis Engl., brazil red quebracho, quebracho-colorado, quebracho crespo; Brazil
- Schinopsis cornuta Loes., horned red quebracho, quebracho-colorado; Paraguay, Bolivia
- Schinopsis peruviana, quebracho-colorado (boliviano); Peru
- the white quebracho or quebracho blanco, quebracho amarillo, Aspidosperma quebracho-blanco of the family Apocynaceae; Paraguay, Argentina, Bolivia, West-Central Brazil
- Aspidosperma triternatum Rojas Acosta; North Argentina, Bolivia, Paraguay; quebracho blanco lagunero, quebracho blanco chico, quebrachillo blanco, chico or pardo and quebracho negro.
- Aspidosperma olivaceum Müll.Arg.; Southeast Brazil; quebracho blanco
- Aspidosperma parvifolium A.DC.; Venezuela; Aspidosperma australe Müll.Arg.; (quebracho amarillo)
- Aspidosperma tomentosum Mart.; Brazil; quebracho, quebracho blanco moroti

These species provide tannin and a very hard, durable timber. Quebracho is sometimes used as a commercial name for the tannin derived from the trees or their timber.

A further species, Jodina rhombifolia (Syn. Iodinia rhombifolia, the quebracho flojo (the loose, soft quebracho) or quebrachillo, quebrachillo flojo and sombra de toro, sombra de toro macho, quinchilin, quinchirin, of the family Santalaceae, is also sometimes mentioned.

Other species with less economic significance are also locally known as quebracho or as quebrachillo or quebrachilla and could be found in other areas of Latin America:

- Acanthosyris spinescens (Mart. & Eichler) Griseb.; Santalaceae; Northeast Argentina, Uruguay, South Brazil; Acanthosyris falcata Griseb.; (quebrachill(a)o, quebracho flojo, sombra de toro (hembra))
- Albizia carbonaria Britton; Fabaceae; El Salvador
- Astronium fraxinifolium Schott; Anacardiaceae; N. Colombia
- Athyana weinmannifolia (Griseb.) Radlk.; Sapindaceae; (quebrachillo)
- Berberis ruscifolia Lam.; Berberis spinulosa A.St.-Hil.; Berberidaceae; Argentina resp. Brazil (quebrachill(a)o)
- Cojoba arborea (L.) Britton & Rose; Fabaceae; Nicaragua
- Diatenopteryx sorbifolia Radlk.; Sapindaceae; (quebrachillo, quebrachillo blanco)
- Diphysa americana Benth.; Leguminosae; Honduras; (quebracho de cerro)
- Handroanthus chrysanthus (Jacq.) S.O.Grose; Bignoniaceae; Honduras, Guatemala; Handroanthus impetiginosus (Mart. ex DC.) Mattos
- Krugiodendron ferreum Urban; Rhamnaceae; Cuba, Belize, Honduras; also (quiebraho, quiebrahacha); Puerto Rico, Dominican Republic, Belize
- Leptolobium elegans Vogel; Fabaceae; Paraguay (quebracho negro)
- Libidibia paraguariensis (D.Parodi); Fabaceae; (quebracho negro)
- Lonchocarpus michelianus Pittier; Leguminosae; Salvador
- Lysiloma acapulcense Benth.; Leguminosae; Honduras
- Lysiloma auritum (Schltdl.) Benth.; Leguminosae; Honduras, Nicaragua (quebracho, quebracho azul)
- Lysiloma divaricatum Steud.; Leguminosae; Salvador (quebracho, quebracho azul)
- Maytenus magellanica (Lam.) Hook.f.; (quebracho, quebrachito), Maytenus ilicifolia (quebrachill(a)o)
- Pentaclethra macroloba (Willd.) Kuntze; Fabaceae; Costa Rica)
- Pleuranthodendron lindenii (Turcz.) Sleumer; Salicaceae; Costa Rica (quebracho blanco)
- Piptadenia constricta MacBride; Leguminosae; Salvador
- Poeppigia procera Presl.; Leguminosae; Salvador (quebracho blanco)
- Sloanea jamaicensis Hook.; Elaeocarpaceae; Jamaica
- Thouinia striata Radlk.; Sapindaceae; Puerto Rico
- Tipuana tipu (Benth.) Kuntze; Fabaceae; (quebracho blanco alto)
- Weinmannia organensis Gardner; Cunoniaceae; (quebracho crespo)

as false quebracho or quebracho falso

- Qualea cordata Spreng.; Vochysiaceae; Paraguay, Brazil

== Wood ==
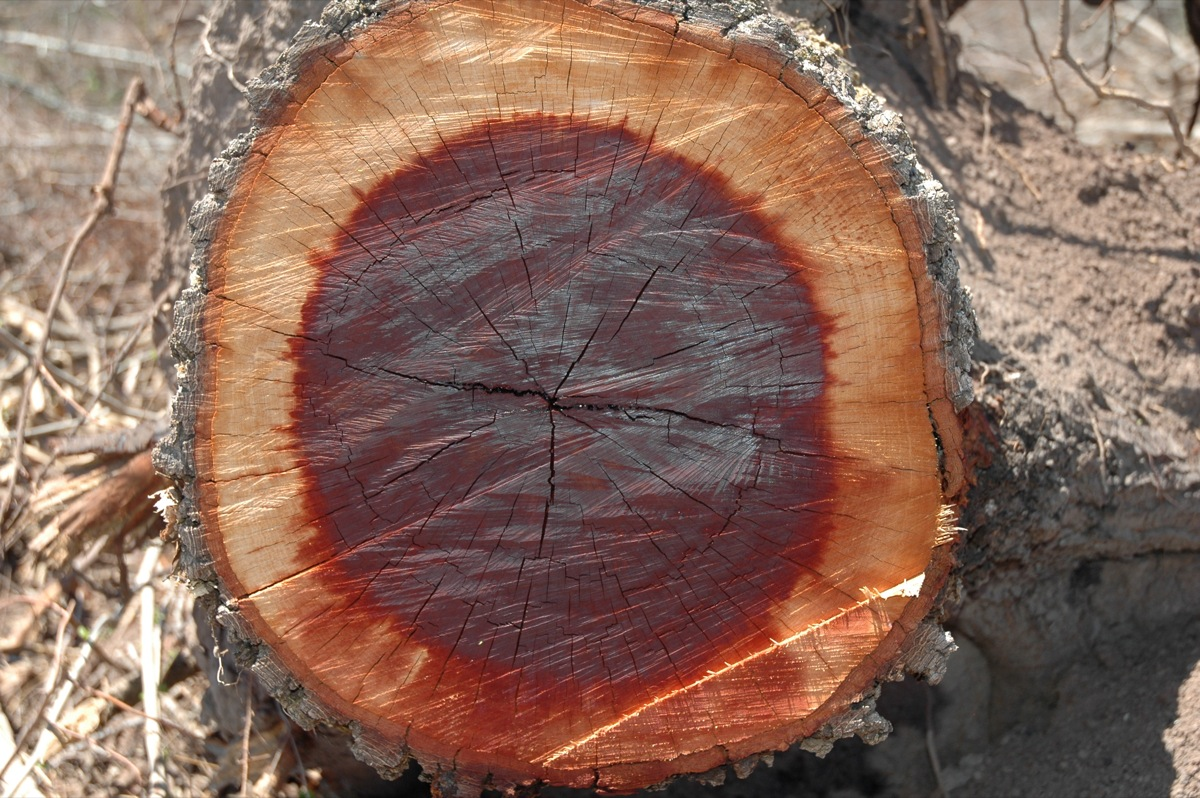
Quebracho colorado (Schinopsis balansae) wood

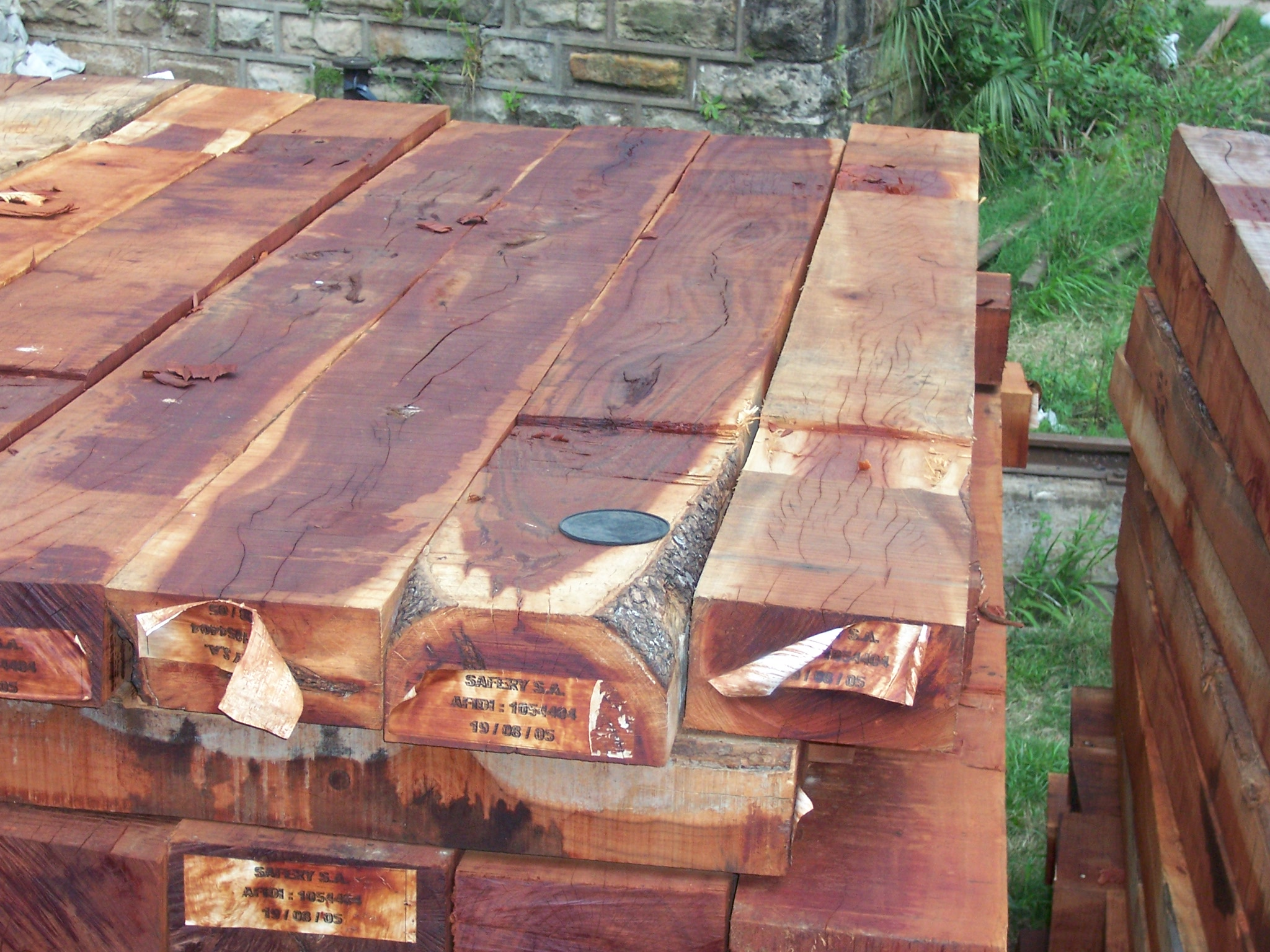
Quebracho colorado wooden sleepers of Argentine origin in Uruguay

Quebracho wood from Schinopsis spp is red-colored and very hard. Other names for the wood are:

- Quebracho chaqueño - Argentina
- Quebracho colorado - Argentina
- Quebracho macho - Argentina
- Quebracho moro - Argentina
- Quebracho negro - Argentina
- Quebracho santiagueño - Argentina
- Barauna - Brazil
- Brauna - Brazil
- Quebracho colorado - Brazil
- Quebracho hembra - Brazil
- Quebracho cornillo (= Schinopsis lorentzii) - Brazil
- Quebracho femea (= S. balansae) - Brazil
- Quebracho rubio - Paraguay
- Soto negro - Paraguay

== Tannins ==
Quebracho produces tannins that can be extracted in quebracho sawmills from the heartwood of both red (Schinopsis lorentzii) and white quebracho (Aspidosperma quebracho-blanco). Logs are inserted into planers to produce chips that are used to produce the quebracho extract by boiling them in vats. It is used for fine leather tanning and imparts a red-brown color. Ordinary or warm soluble quebracho (also known as insoluble Quebracho) is the natural extract obtained directly from the quebracho wood. This type of extract is rich in condensed tannins of natural high molecular weight (phlobaphenes), which are not easily soluble. Its use is therefore limited to addition of small amounts during the process of tanning leather intended for shoe soles in hot liquids (temperature above 35 °C) to improve the yield and the water-proofness of the leather. The cold soluble extracts are obtained by subjecting the ordinary extract to a sulphiting process which transforms the phlobaphenes into completely soluble tannins. The cold soluble quebracho extracts are the most universally known and used types. The chemical structure of these extracts can be described as polymers of epicatechin. The main properties of these extracts are: a very rapid penetration, a high tannin content and a relatively low percentage of non-tannins. The rather low acid and medium salt content characterise them as mild tanning extracts (low astringency). Quebracho tannins give an important added value to the quality of leathers, such as vacchetta, belts and garments, making them more compact and tear resistant with a pleasant touch. The sulphited quebracho extract may be carcinogenous in mice. Other recent studies show that quebracho tannins present a strong anti-mutagenic activity. The heartwood contains from 20 to 30 percent tannin and 3 or 4 percent water-soluble nontannin. It is said to not ferment.

According to King and White (1957), the hydrolysable tannins and gallic acid found in the sapwood constitute the raw material for the biosynthesis of the condensed tannins found in the heartwood. Fustin (predominantly (-)-Fustin 66%), (-)-7:3':4'-trihydroxyflavan-3:4-diol ((-)-leuco-fisetinidin), (+)-catechin, gallic acid, fisetin and 2-benzyl-2-hydroxycoumaran-3-ones have been isolated from the heartwoods of Schinopsis balansae, Schinopsis quebrachocolorado and from commercial quebracho extract. Quebracho tannin is rich in profisetinidins and prorobinetidins. The expected masses found in mass spectrometry in negative mode in quebracho tannin are 289, 561, 833, 951, 1105, 1377, 1393, 1651 and 1667. In Quebracho colorado, the sugars and the lignins are thought to be covalently linked to the condensed tannins.

Quebracho tannin is also sold as an enological tannin. The quebracho tannins structure is very similar to that of grape tannins, making them a desirable alternative to consider comparatively because they are much less expensive to produce than grape tannins. Myo-inositol and arabitol are detected in tannins from quebracho.

Researches are being made to develop an eco-friendly anti-biofouling paint from quebracho tannin.

The tannic acid, in the form of alkalized salts, was extensively used as a deflocculant in drilling muds in 1940s-1950s, until it was replaced with lignosulfonates. Its red color gave the mixture the name red mud.

Quebracho tannin acts as flocculant agent to remove surfactant as sodium dodecylbenzenesulfonate in water treatment.

For its polyphenolic structure, quebracho tannin is widely studied for particle boards, plywood and fiber board gluing.

The Argentine companies Unitán and Silvateam are the main leaders in quebracho tannins production.

== Quebracho exploitation ==
The tanning properties of quebracho extracts were discovered in 1867 by a French tanner, Emilio Poisier, who lived in Argentina. By 1895, the quebracho extracts were exported to Europe and became the principal vegetal tannin source in the world. Amongst other activities Ernesto Tornquist (1842–1908) organised the exploitation of quebracho in Santiago del Estero, in the Chaco region. Originally a dry forest area, the abundance of quebracho attracted timber industries of British capital during the 19th century, leading to extensive deforestation. This devastated the ecosystem in a relatively short time. The private owners of the Chaco then turned to cotton production, employing the local Toba people as a cheap seasonal workforce; the conditions did not change substantially for decades.

The British-owned Central Argentine Railway reached the city of Santiago del Estero in 1884 and the trees were exported via San Lorenzo port.

== Barbeque ==
The quebracho tree is also used to produce hard wood barbecue charcoal.
