= Quebracho blanco =

Quebracho blanco may refer to:

- Aspidosperma quebracho-blanco, South American tree species in the family Apocynaceae
- Schinopsis haenkeana, South American tree species in the family Anacardiaceae

== See also ==
- Quebracho tree
