= Kaa-Iya del Gran Chaco National Park and Integrated Management Natural Area =

Biggest national park in Bolivia

- Location within Bolivia
- Location: Bolivia; Santa Cruz Department
- Coordinates: 19°04′S 61°15′W
- Area: 34,411 km^{2} (13,286 sq mi)
- Established: 21 September 1995
- Governing body: Servicio Nacional de Áreas Protegidas (SERNAP)

Kaa-Iya del Gran Chaco National Park and Integrated Management Natural Area (Parque Nacional y Area Natural de Manejo Integrado Kaa-Iya del Gran Chaco) is the biggest national park in Bolivia and one of the largest in South America. It is a protected area in the region of the Gran Chaco and has a larger surface area than Belgium. It is situated in the south of Santa Cruz Department on the border with Paraguay in the Cordillera Province (Charagua Municipality) and Chiquitos Province (Pailón and San José de Chiquitos municipalities).

== Etymology ==
Kaa-Iya is a term from Guarani mythology which means "mountain owners", or a place where riches are found, in the sense of abundance of natural resources and the relationship between man and nature.

== Geography ==
- Area: 3,441,115 hectares (34,411.15 km^{2})
- Altitude: between 100 and 839 meters above sea level.
- Rainfall: 1,400 to 400 mm annually.
- Hydrology: The principal river is the Parapetí, among many others.
- Coordinates: Latitude 17º42’30’’ - 20º02’30" S, Longitude 60º03’30’’ – 62º31’30’’ W

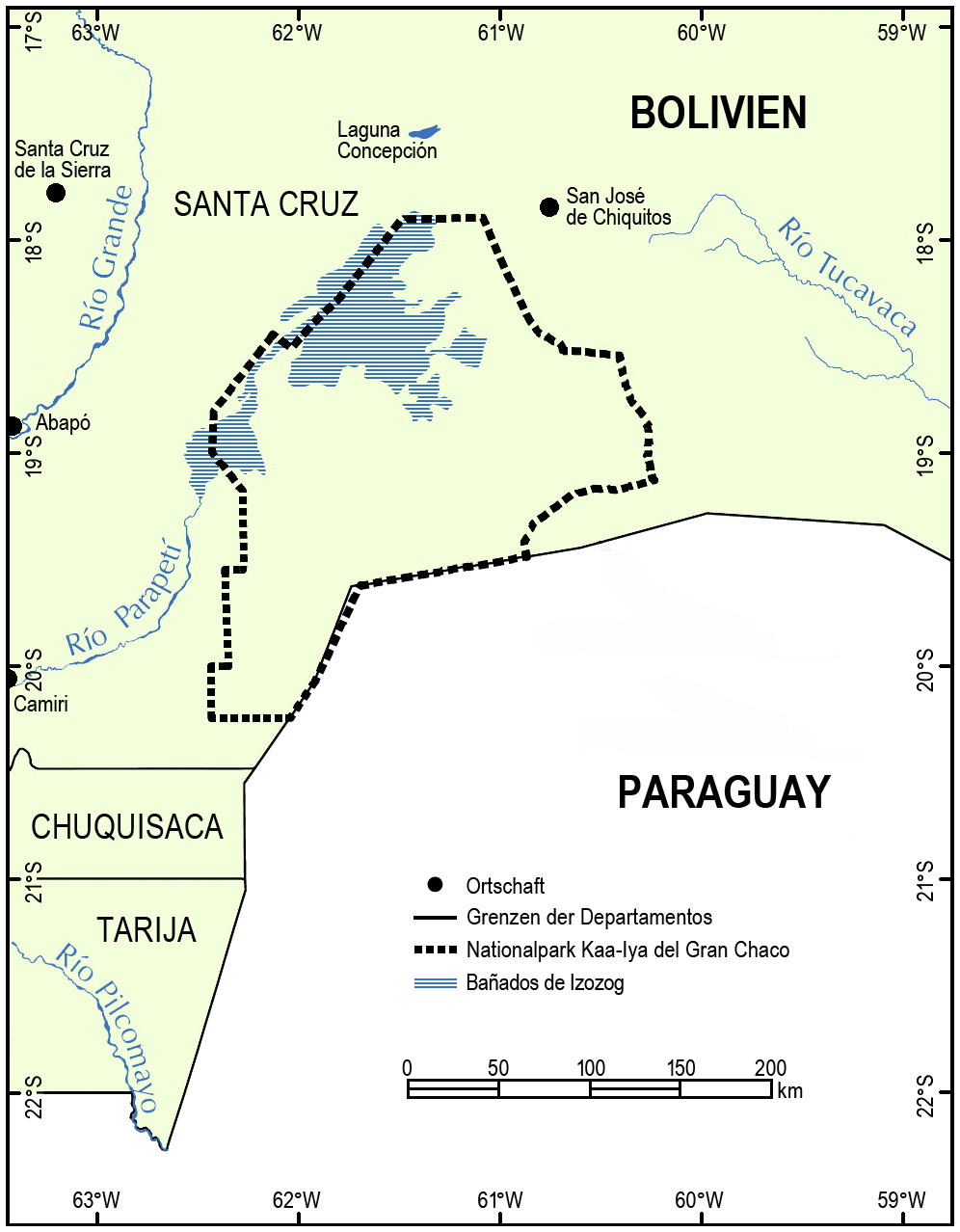
Boundaries of the park in southeastern Bolivia.

== Characteristics of the area ==
It is principally known for containing the largest tropical wooded area in the world. It also contains an incredible range of animal species, most notably the last remaining large felidae and more than 100 other distinct species of mammal.

Kaa-Iya del Gran Chaco is linked with Otuquis National Park and newly created Ñembi Guasu conservation area, covering about 60,000 km^{2} of Gran-Chaco forest.

== Flora ==
880 species of vascular plants and 28 species of spore plants (plants without flowers) have been registered in the National Park, as well as an estimated 1500 species of higher plants. Some examples which stand out are the red quebracho (Schinopsis lorentzii), black soto (Schinopsis cornuta), black guayacán (Izozogia nelly), cuchi (Myracrodruon urundeuva), purple guayacán (Bulnesia sarmientoi), soto de arenales (Schinopsis corneta), and cupesí (Prosopis chilensis).

Other important species are the floss silk tree (Chorisia speciosa), Iberá-Bira (Caesalpinia paraguariensis), mistol (Ziziphus mistol), other species such as Bougainvillea praecox, Acacia feddeana, Aspidosperma pyrifolium, wax palm (Copernicia alba) and palma saó (Trithrinax schizophylla).

== Fauna ==
The fauna present in the area is representative of the Chaqueña plains region, with 350 registered species, 89 species of snakes, 301 species of birds, 65 species of small mammals and 59 species of large mammals. Foremost among these are the Chacoan peccary, known locally as tagua or quilimero pig, a common species in Chaco, armadillos (Tolypeutes matacus and Chlamyphorus retusus), common in the region, the Chacoan mara and Conover's tuco-tuco. The jaguar, puma, ocelot and maned wolf can also be found.

The presence of guanacos has been confirmed in the sand-dunes in the south-east of the Natural Area. The white-lipped peccary, armadillo, giant armadillo, silvery marmoset, black howler monkey, pampas deer, bare-faced curassow, harpy eagle and black-and-white hawk-eagle can also be found here.

Kaa Iya National Park is internationally famous for its big cat population, especially the jaguar. It is considered as one of the best places in the world for jaguar viewing opportunities. A camera trap study by WCS estimated that there are over 1000 jaguars living within the park which makes it one of the most important areas for the survival of these big cats. Tapirs, pumas, ocelots and more are seen frequently inside the park.

== Local population ==
The pattern of human occupation in the area is made up of the Guaranís and Chiquitanos villages as well as farmers. Human presence is only in the outlying areas although it is moving inwards in respect to the use of the area's resources. There is a greater concentration of people towards the west (Isozo), Chiquitano settlements in the north and some scattered communities in other areas. In any case, it can be confirmed that the interior of the area is free of human occupation.

The greatest concentration of people is found towards the west (Bañados de Izoso), in the area's power base, where there are more than twenty Guaraní communities, including Guarirenda, Rincón, Huirapendi, Guirayasa, Coropo, Cacharí, Aguraigua, Guirapendio, Isiporenda, and Yapiroa. The largest Chiquitana community is San Pablo, located in the north.

There are groups of mostly Izoceños and Ayoreode origin, including uncontacted groups of Ayoreo nomads.

The ruins of San Ignacio de Zamucos, a Jesuit mission that was active from 1724 to 1745, are located in the southeastern end of the Kaa-Iya del Gran Chaco National Park.

== Administration ==
The development of the national park is being carried out under shared administration, under an agreement with the Upper and Lower Izozog Authority (Capitanía del Alto y Bajo Izozog), an indigenous Izoceño-Guaraní organisation, signed on 24 November 1995.

The development committee is composed of representatives from the municipalities of Charagua, Pailón, San José de Chuiquitos, and the sub-mayoralty of Isoso, as well as the founding organisations of TURUBO, CABI, CICHIPA (Indigenous Office for Chiquitano Communities of Pailón), Santa Teresita (Ayorea Community), CIMCI, and representatives of the government, SERNAP and the Departmental Prefecture.

== Relevant aspects ==
The park makes up the only area set aside to protect the extensive remaining areas of the South American Chaco, including most of the ecosystems belonging to the region.

This park, despite its low prominence and the apparent monotony of its countryside, is of great interest due to the enormous richness of its wildlife for the development of eco- and adventure-tourism.

The presence of representatives of the indigenous Izoceño, Chiquitano and Ayorea populations increases the importance of the area; among other cultural expressions, they produced very stylised craftwork.

There are historic sites in the power base of the region, e.g. the Missions of San José de Chiquitos and Santa Cruz la Vieja.

The population mostly consists of the Izoceño, Chiquitano and Ayoreode ethnicities, including a group of Ayoreode nomads. There are other populations recently migrated from other regions of Santa Cruz (ranch owners, farm workers, rural manual workers) who mostly work in cattle ranching.

== Potential ==
Given its double categorisation as National Park and Integrated Management Natural Area, the Area presents enormous possibilities for developing wildlife management programs of regional applicability.

The region undoubtedly constitutes an important natural reservoir of genetic diversity, both animal and human (indigenous Guaraní cultures). Furthermore, due to its natural and cultural value, tourist operations could be developed in the Area.

The biological diversity of the Protected Area is due to variability in climate and soil conditions, as well as the lack of availability of water, which influence the unusual flora and fauna of the region.

== Threats ==
The most serious threats to the park come principally from hydrocarbon-related activities; seismic prospecting in the Bañados, drilling for petroleum in Ustarez and the Bolivia-Brazil gas pipelines, followed by the expansion of agricultural and cattle-ranching landuse; illegal commercial hunting and the diversion of the river Parapeto for agricultural purposes.

== Power base ==
The area's most important settlements are Camiri, Charagua, Boyuibe and Cabezas in Cordillera Province, and San José in Chiquitos Province.

== Accessibility ==
Access to the area is difficult. In the humid season, the Area's roads are unusable. Except for the Santa Cruz-Bajo Izoso-Camiri road which borders the Area and partially enters the communities of Bajo Izoso, there are no other stable roads. In many zones entrance is via cattle paths. From San José de Chiquitos there is a bridlepath which joins Fortín Ravelo and Suárez Arana, forming the most stable path in the extreme east of the Area.
