= S. heterophylla =

S. heterophylla may refer to:

- Schinopsis heterophylla, a South American tree species
- Stylomecon heterophylla, the wind poppy, a flowering plant species native to California and north western Mexico
