= Sombra de touro =

Sombra de touro (Portuguese for "shadow of the bull or bull's shadow") may refer to several tree species:

- Acanthosyris spinescens
- Jodina rhombifolia
- Vitex megapotamica
