= Parauncinula polyspora =

Scientific classification
- Kingdom: Fungi
- Division: Ascomycota
- Class: Leotiomycetes
- Order: Helotiales
- Family: Erysiphaceae
- Genus: Parauncinula
- Species: P. polyspora

Binomial name
- Parauncinula polyspora Meeboon & S. Takam. 2017

Species of fungus

Parauncinula polyspora is a species of powdery mildew in the family Erysiphaceae. It is found on plants in the genus Quercus in Asia. It is only known from Japan.

== Description ==
The fungus forms effuse, evanescent mycelium on the leaves of its host. Parauncinula polyspora, like most Erysiphaceae, is highly host-specific and infects only Quercus. Parauncinula septata is also found on the same hosts but generally has fewer spores per ascus. Parauncinula uncinata is found only on Quercus variabilis and has appendages with uncinate tips and septa not reaching the upper part of the appendages.

== Taxonomy ==
The fungus was formally described in 2017 by Meeboon and Takamatsu based on slight morphological differences but very different ITS sequences to Parauncinula septata.
