= Parauncinula septata =

Scientific classification
- Kingdom: Fungi
- Division: Ascomycota
- Class: Leotiomycetes
- Order: Helotiales
- Family: Erysiphaceae
- Genus: Parauncinula
- Species: P. septata

Binomial name
- Parauncinula septata (E.S. Salmon) S. Takam. & U. Braun, 2005

Synonyms
- Uncinula septata E.S. Salmon, 1900

Species of fungus

Parauncinula septata is a species of powdery mildew in the family Erysiphaceae. It is found on plants in the genus Quercus in Asia. It is known from China and Japan.

== Description ==
The fungus forms effuse, evanescent mycelium on the leaves of its host. Parauncinula septata, like most Erysiphaceae, is highly host-specific and infects only Quercus. Parauncinula polyspora is also found on the same hosts but generally has more spores per ascus. Parauncinula uncinata is found only on Quercus variabilis and has appendages with uncinate tips and septa not reaching the upper part of the appendages.

== Taxonomy ==
The fungus was formally described in 1900 by E.S. Salmon with the basionym Uncinula septata. The species was transferred to the current genus Parauncinula in 2005 by Takamatsu and Braun.
