= Unitan =

Unitan may refer to:

- Unitán, an Argentine company producing quebracho tannins
- the mascot of the 1985 Summer Universiade
