= Sociedades anónimas inscritas de capital abierto =

Sociedades anónimas inscritas de capital abierto (S.A.I.C.A.) is a type of company in Argentina.

Unitán, a company producing Quebracho tannins, is an example of the type of companies.

== See also ==
- List of business entities
- S.A. (corporation)
