= Coleophora haywardi =

Scientific classification
- Kingdom: Animalia
- Phylum: Arthropoda
- Class: Insecta
- Order: Lepidoptera
- Family: Coleophoridae
- Genus: Coleophora
- Species: C. haywardi

Binomial name
- Coleophora haywardi Pastrana, 1963

Species of moth

Coleophora haywardi is a moth of the family Coleophoridae. It is known from South America, including Argentina.

Schinopsis is the exclusive food plant of the moth larvae.
