= Parauncinula curvispora =

Scientific classification
- Kingdom: Fungi
- Division: Ascomycota
- Class: Leotiomycetes
- Order: Helotiales
- Family: Erysiphaceae
- Genus: Parauncinula
- Species: P. curvispora

Binomial name
- Parauncinula curvispora (Hara) S. Takam. & U. Braun, 2005

Synonyms
- Uncinula septata var. curvispora Hara, 1915; Uncinula curvispora (Hara) Hara, 1919; Erysiphe curvispora (Hara) U. Braun & S. Takam., 2000

Species of fungus

Parauncinula curvispora is a species of powdery mildew in the family Erysiphaceae. It is found on plants in the genus Fagus in Asia. It is endemic to Japan.

== Description ==
The fungus forms effuse, evanescent mycelium on the leaves of its host. Parauncinula curvispora, like most Erysiphaceae, is highly host-specific and infects only Fagus.

== Taxonomy ==
The fungus was formally described in 1915 by Hara with the basionym Uncinula septata var. curvispora. The same author raised the variety to a species four years later. The species was transferred to the current genus Parauncinula in 2005 by Takamatsu and Braun.
