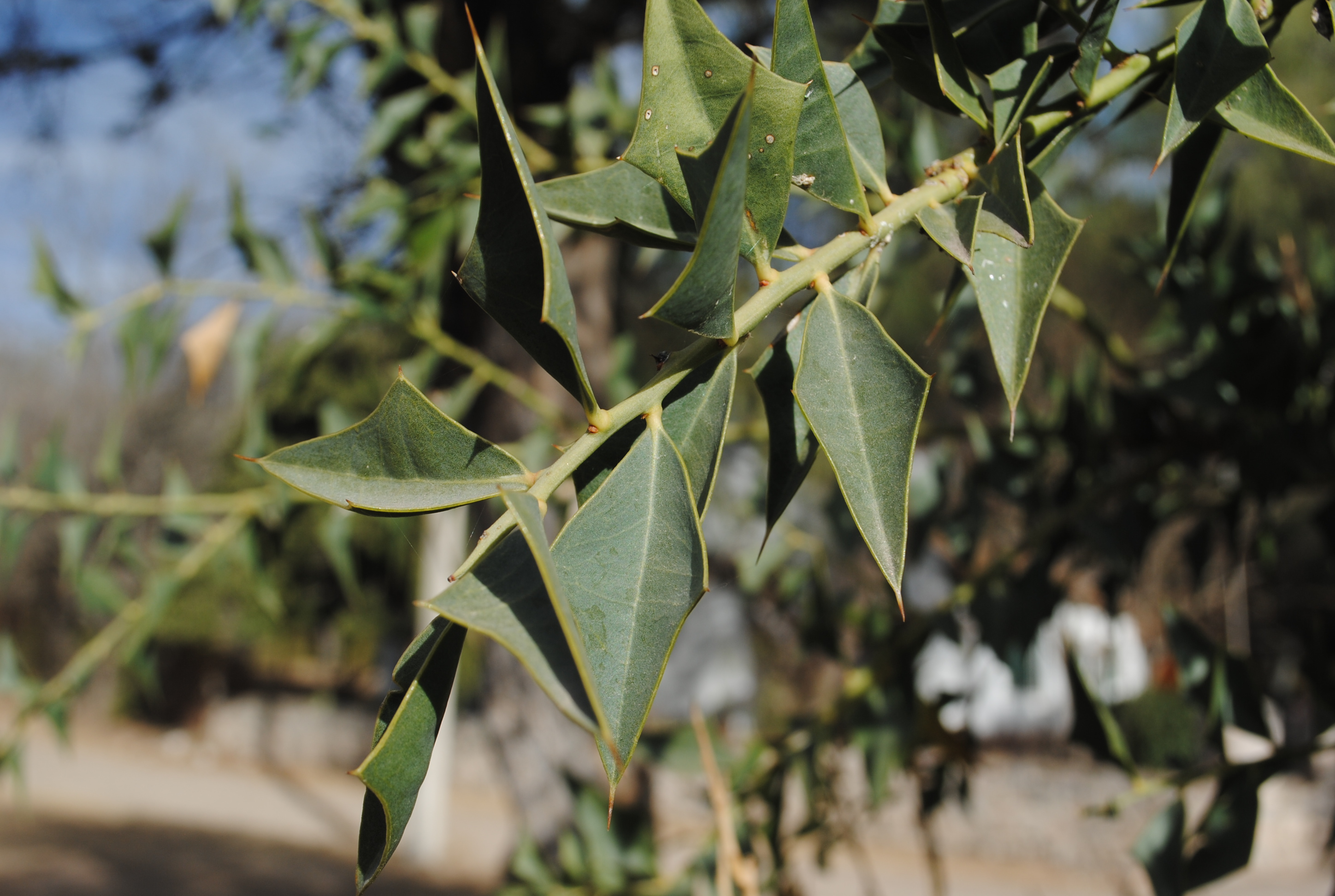

Scientific classification
- Kingdom: Plantae
- Clade: Tracheophytes
- Clade: Angiosperms
- Clade: Eudicots
- Order: Santalales
- Family: Santalaceae
- Genus: Jodina
- Species: J. rhombifolia

Binomial name
- Jodina rhombifolia (Hook. & Arn.) Reissek

= Jodina rhombifolia =

Species of flowering plant

Jodina rhombifolia (the quebracho flojo (the loose quebracho), quebracho flajo, sombra de toro or quebrachillo) is a tree species in the family Santalaceae.
