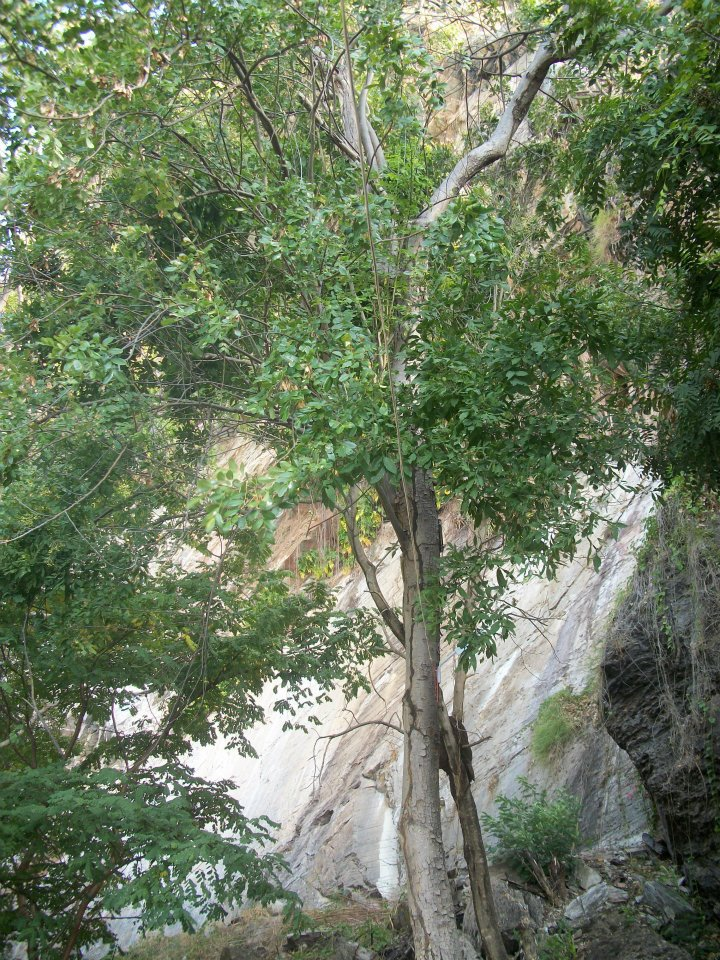

Scientific classification
- Kingdom: Plantae
- Clade: Tracheophytes
- Clade: Angiosperms
- Clade: Eudicots
- Clade: Rosids
- Order: Sapindales
- Family: Anacardiaceae
- Genus: Schinopsis
- Species: S. brasiliensis

Binomial name
- Schinopsis brasiliensis Engl.

= Schinopsis brasiliensis =

Species of tree

Schinopsis brasiliensis is a species of flowering plant in the cashew family known by the common names baraúna or braúna.

This species is native to Brazil, Bolivia, and Paraguay. It is a component of the Caatinga ecoregion in northwestern Brazil and the Chiquitano dry forests ecoregion of eastern Bolivia and adjacent portions of Brazil.

== Taxonomy ==
It was first named and described in 1876 by Adolf Engler.

== Description ==
Schinopsis brasiliensis can grow up to 12 metres (39 ft) tall with a trunk diameter of 60 centimeters.

== Uses ==
This tree has a hard, sturdy wood which is used in construction. Because of its harvesting for this purpose, the tree is considered an endangered species.

Two species of mite have been noted to live on this tree, Calacarus torulus and Shevtchenkella schinopsidis.
