= Silvateam =

Silvateam S.p.A.
- Company type: Family owned business
- Founded: 1854
- Headquarters: San Michele Mondovì (Cuneo) - Italy
- Revenue: 122 million euro (2012)
- Website: www.silvateam.com

Silvateam S.p.A. is a producer of tannins and specialty chemicals mainly for leather industry. It was formed in 1854, when Carlo Giuseppe Battaglia built the first plant in Frabosa Corsaglia (Cuneo, northern Italy) for the extraction of tannins from chestnut wood. The headquarters is located in San Michele Mondovì (Cuneo), with operations in Italy, Argentina, Peru and China. The group has approximately 800 employees with a turnover of 122 million euro.

== Activities ==
The company's activities were structured into three main lines of business: leather, food ingredients and animal nutrition.

The Leather business focuses on products for leather tanning and comprises vegetable extracts, synthetic tannins and fatliquors, while the Food Ingredients business supplies pectin, Tara gum for food and beverage industry. The animal nutrition division is dedicated to the production of natural extracts for monogastrics and ruminants.
