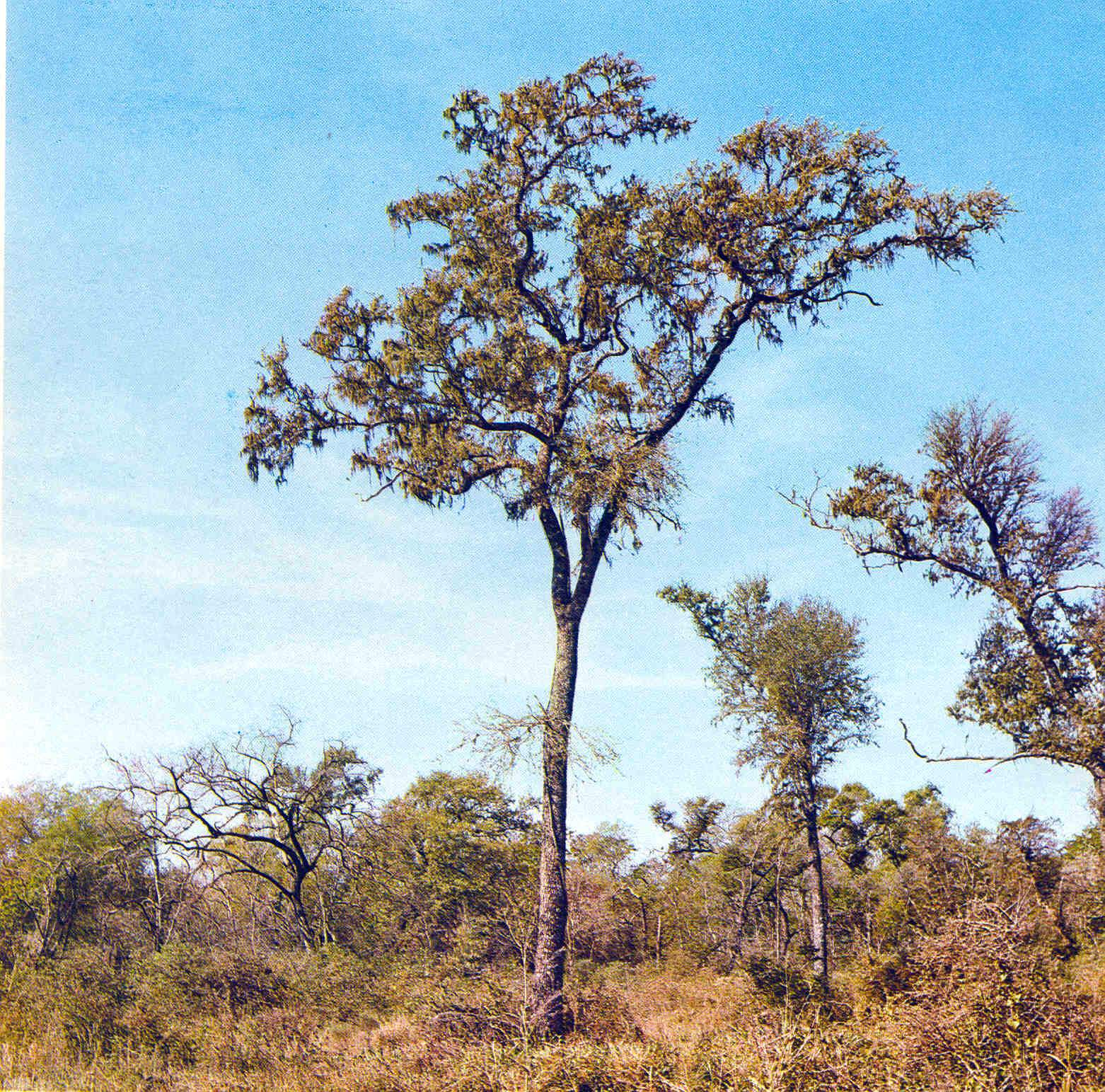
- Quebracho colorado chaqueño (Schinopsis balansae)

Scientific classification
- Kingdom: Plantae
- Clade: Embryophytes
- Clade: Tracheophytes
- Clade: Angiosperms
- Clade: Eudicots
- Clade: Rosids
- Order: Sapindales
- Family: Anacardiaceae
- Subfamily: Anacardioideae
- Genus: Schinopsis; Engl.

= Schinopsis =

Genus of trees

Schinopsis is a genus of South American trees in the family Anacardiaceae, also known by the common names quebracho, quebracho colorado and red quebracho. In Brazil it is known as baraúna or braúna.

== Description ==
The species within this genus inhabit different regions of the Gran Chaco ecoregion including parts of northern Argentina, Bolivia, and Paraguay. In Brazil it can be found as a component of the Caatinga in the northwestern region.

The name is in recognition of the hardness of the wood from the Spanish quiebra-hacha ("axe-breaker"). It also distinguishes the species from the "white quebracho" trees of the unrelated genus Aspidosperma.

Schinopsis is the exclusive food plant of the moth Coleophora haywardi.

== Species ==
- Schinopsis balansae (common name: quebracho colorado chaqueño)
- Schinopsis boqueronensis Mogni & Oakley
- Schinopsis brasiliensis Engl.
- Schinopsis cornuta Loes.
- Schinopsis haenkeana
- Schinopsis heterophylla Ragonese & J.A.Castigl.(common name: Quebracho colorado mestizo)
- Schinopsis lorentzii (Griseb.) Engl., synonym S. quebracho-colorado (common name: quebracho colorado santiagueño)
- Schinopsis marginata Engl.
- Schinopsis peruviana Engl.

== Uses ==
The timber is used in furniture and on railroads due to its durability.

== Parasites and pathogens ==
Schinopsis is the sole host of the ancestral powdery mildew species Caespitotheca forestalis, which is known from Schinopsis balansae, Schinopsis haenkeana, and Schinopsis lorentzii.
