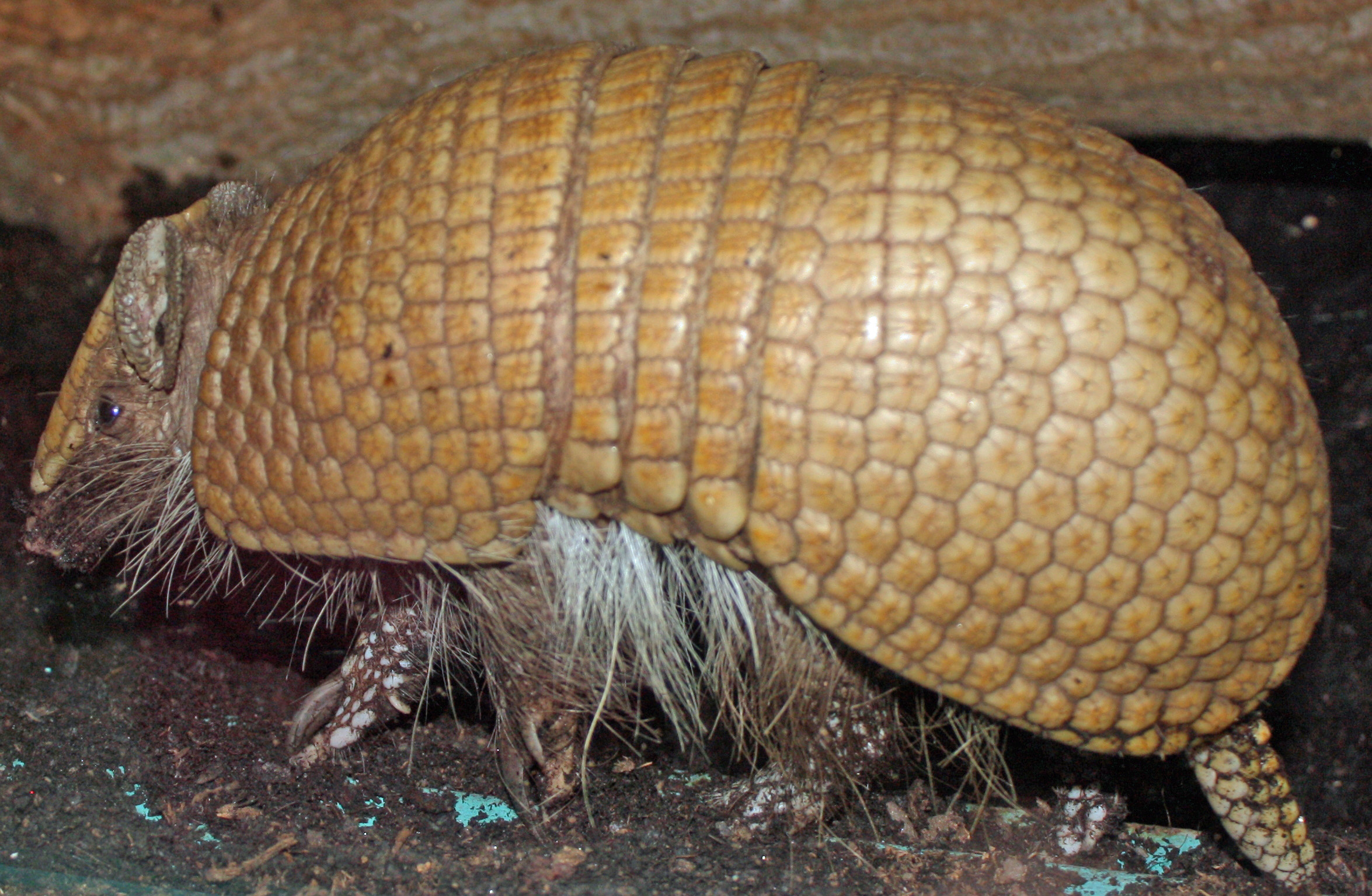
- Southern three-banded armadillo at the Louisville Zoo

Conservation status
- Near Threatened (IUCN 3.1)

Scientific classification
- Kingdom: Animalia
- Phylum: Chordata
- Class: Mammalia
- Order: Cingulata
- Family: Chlamyphoridae
- Subfamily: Tolypeutinae
- Genus: Tolypeutes
- Species: T. matacus

Binomial name
- Tolypeutes matacus (Desmarest, 1804)
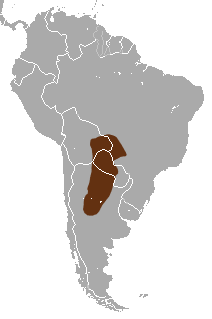
- Southern three-banded armadillo range

= Southern three-banded armadillo =

Type of Armadillo

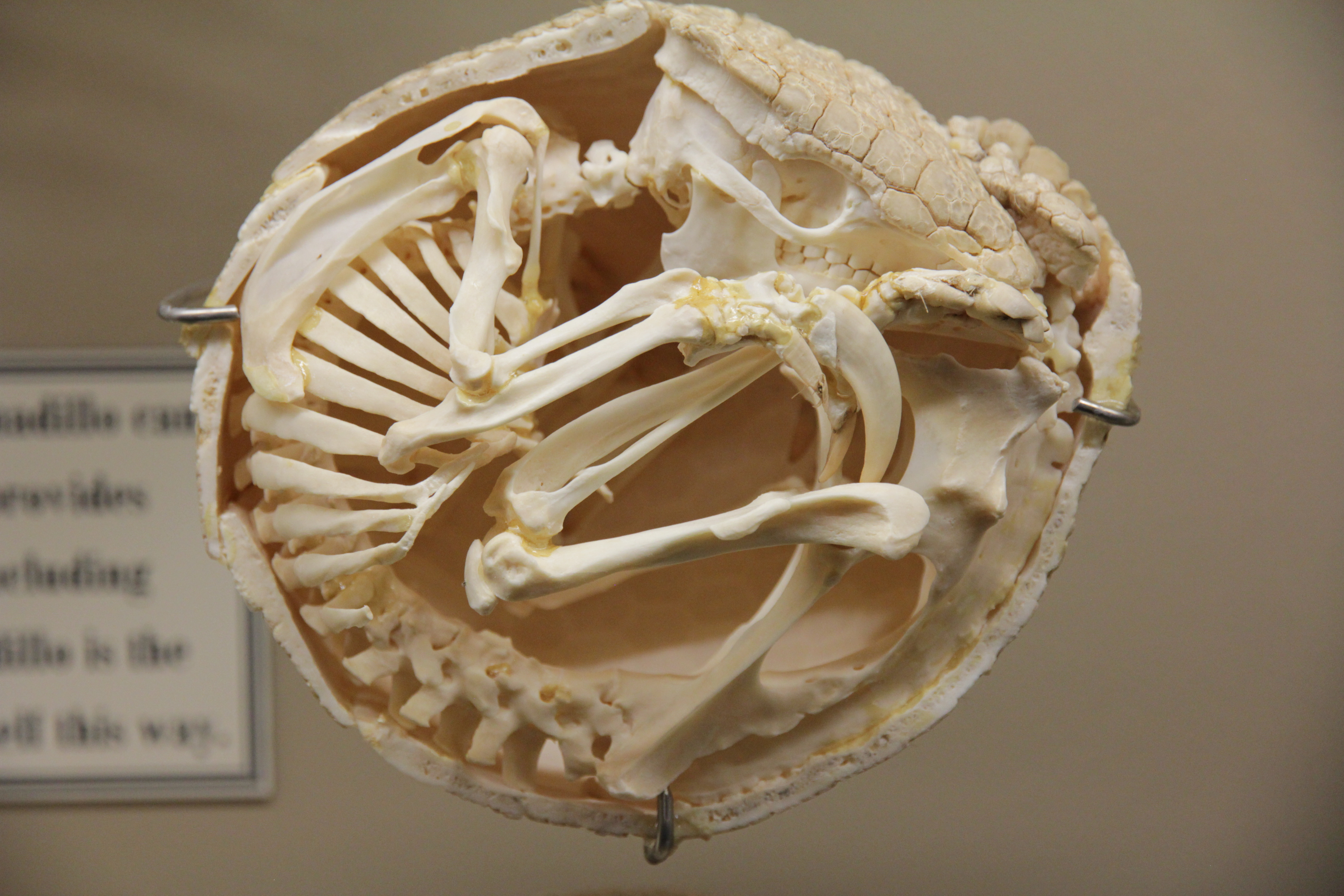
Three banded armadillo skeleton rolled in a ball (Museum of Osteology)

The southern three-banded armadillo (Tolypeutes matacus), also known as La Plata three-banded armadillo or Azara's domed armadillo, is an armadillo species from South America. It is found in parts of northern Argentina, southwestern Brazil, Paraguay and Bolivia, at elevations from sea level to 770 m (2,530 ft).

The southern three-banded armadillo and the other member of the genus Tolypeutes, the Brazilian three-banded armadillo, are the only species of armadillos capable of rolling into a complete ball to defend themselves. The three characteristic bands that cover the back of the animal allow it enough flexibility to fit its tail and head together, allowing it to protect its underbelly, limbs, eyes, nose and ears from predators. The shell covering its body is armored and the outer layer is made out of keratin, the same protein that builds human fingernails. They are typically a yellow or brownish color. They are among the smaller armadillos, with a head-and-body length of about 22 to 27 cm (8.7 to 10.6 in) and a weight between 1 and 1.6 kg (2.2 and 3.5 lb). Unlike most armadillos, they are not fossorial, but will use abandoned giant anteater burrows.

The three-banded armadillo has a long, sticky, straw-like pink tongue that allows it to gather up and eat many different species of insects, typically ants and termites. In captivity, armadillos also eat foods such as fruits and vegetables.

The species is threatened by habitat destruction from conversion of its native Dry Chaco to farmland, and from hunting for food and the pet trade.

== Gallery ==
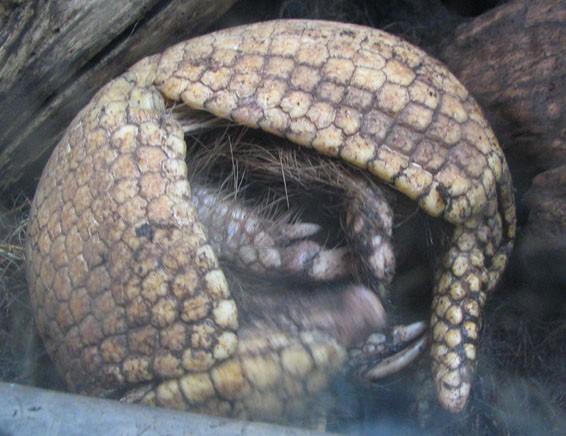
Individual in the process of curling up

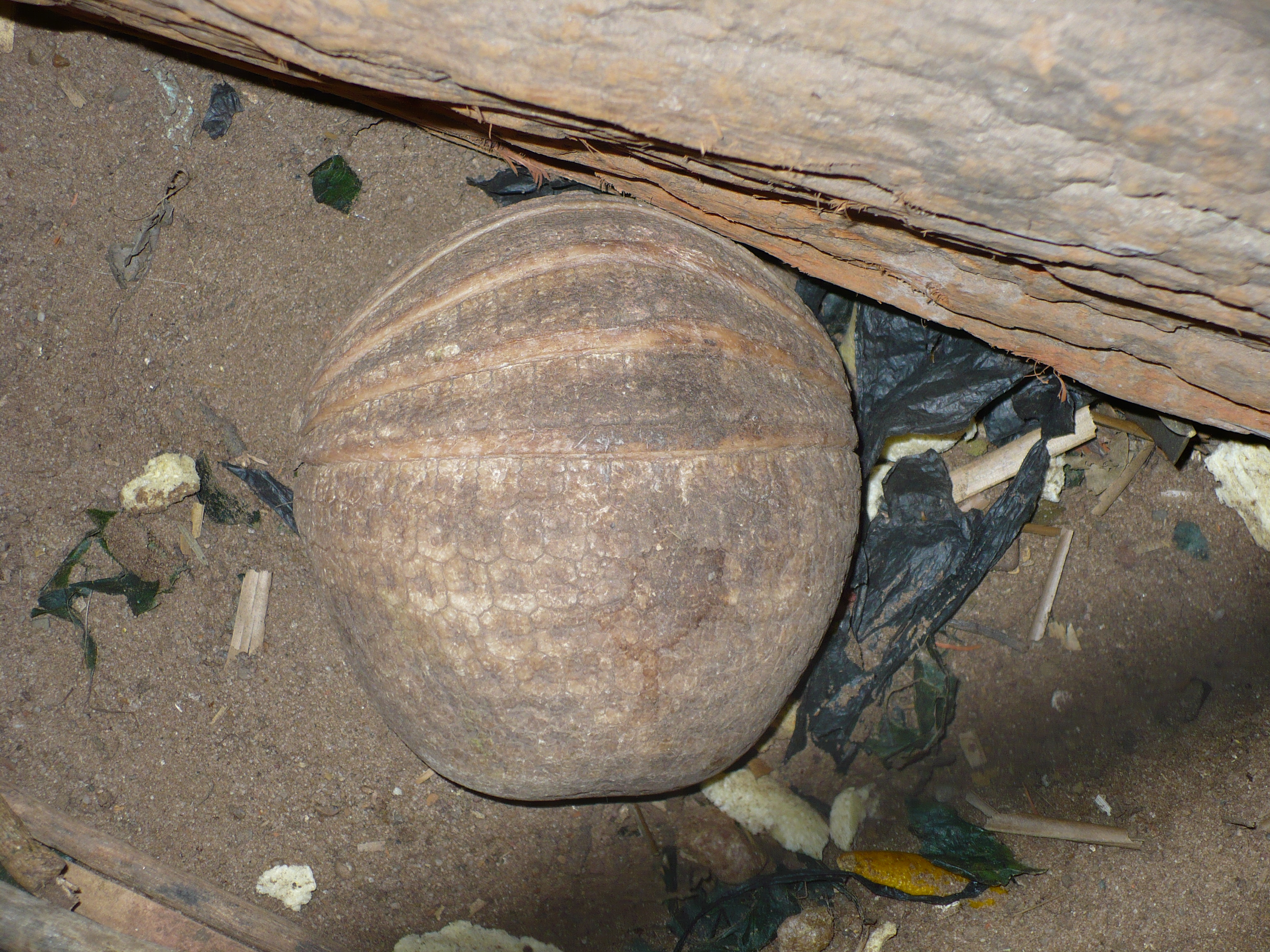
Individual rolled up into a defensive ball
