= Unitán =

Unitán S.A.I.C.A.
- Company type: S.A.I.C.A.
- Industry: Quebracho tannins
- Headquarters: Buenos Aires, Argentina
- Website: www.unitan.net

Unitán is an Argentine company producing quebracho tannins. Its production amounts to 40.000 tonnes of tannins sold to the tanning industry, the drilling industry, for the enological applications and as animal food.

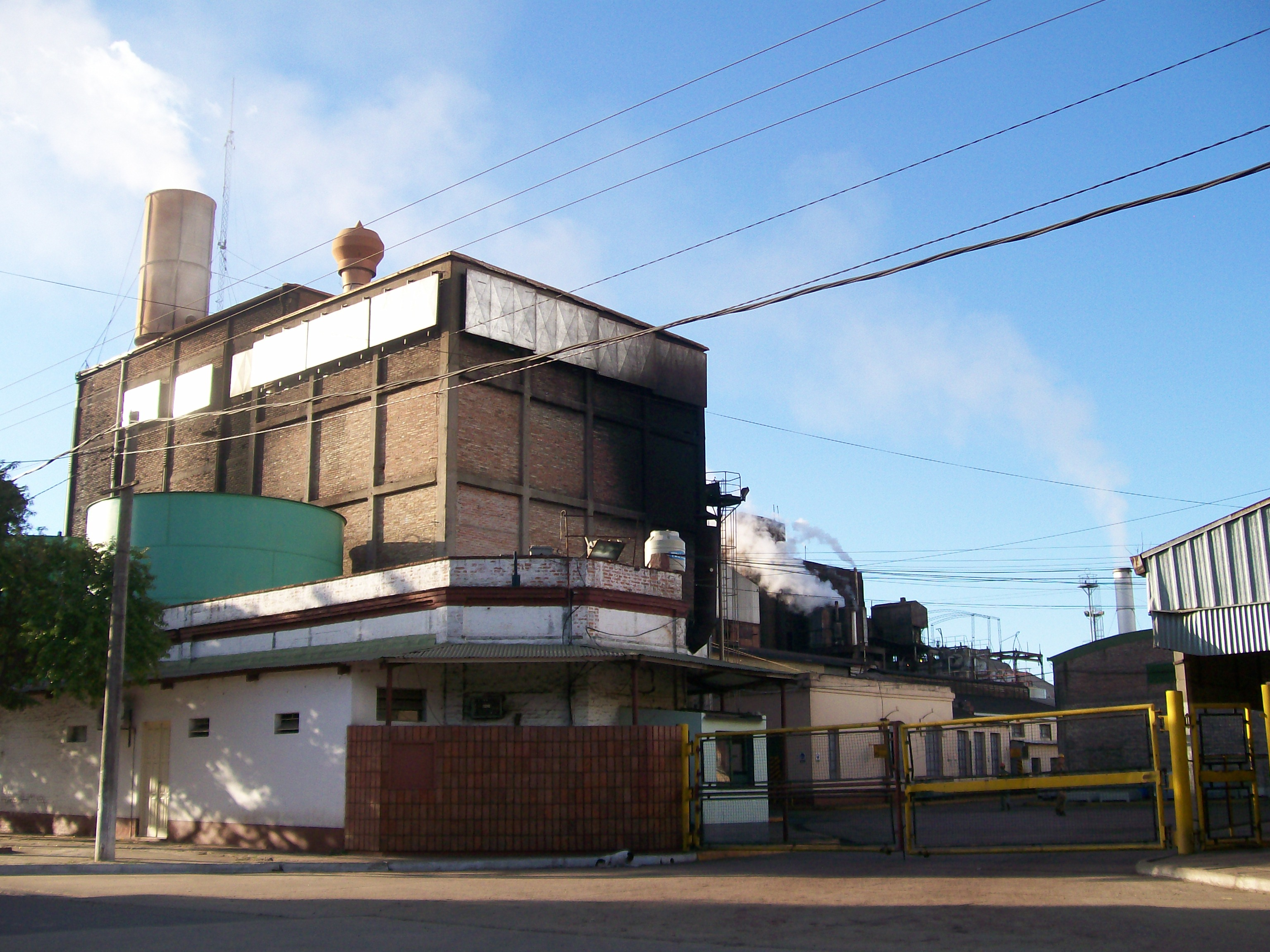
Tannin production plant in Puerto Tirol

Unitan possesses a production plant located in Puerto Tirol, Chaco Province
