= Chiquitano dry forests =

Ecoregion in Bolivia and Brazil

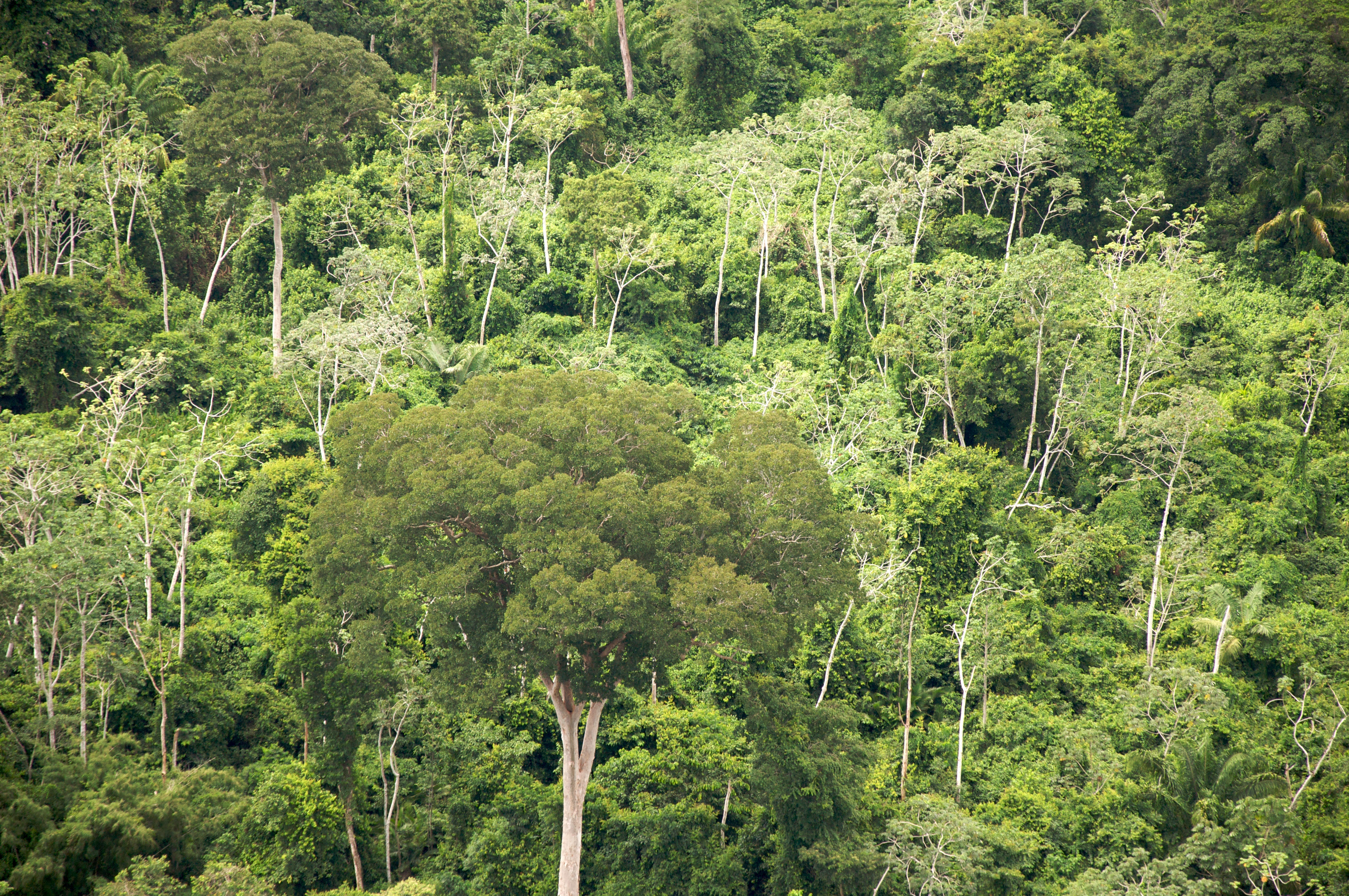

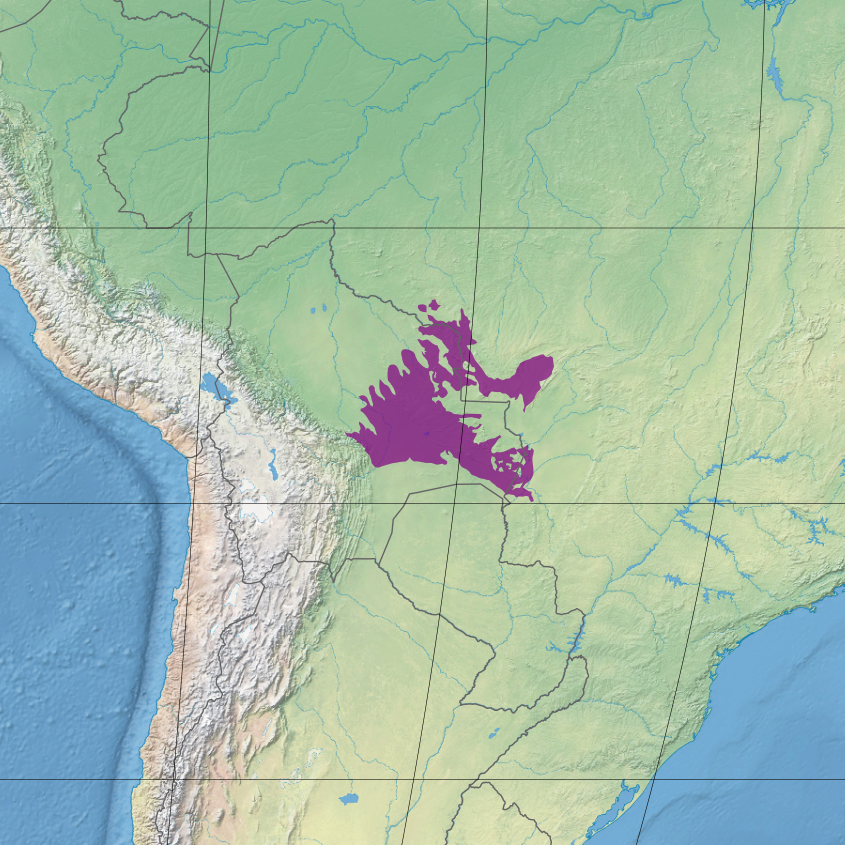
- Ecoregion territory (in purple)

Ecology
- Realm: Neotropical
- Biome: tropical and subtropical dry broadleaf forests – Amazon
- Borders: List: Cerrado; Dry Chaco; Madeira-Tapajós moist forests; Pantanal; Southwest Amazon moist forests

Geography
- Area: 229,766 km^{2} (88,713 mi^{2})
- Countries: Brazil; Bolivia
- Coordinates: 15°S 62°W

Conservation
- Protected: 55,861 km² (24%)

The Chiquitano dry forests is a tropical dry broadleaf forest ecoregion in Bolivia and Brazil. The ecoregion is named for the Chiquitano people who live in the region.

== Setting ==
The Chiquitano dry forests cover an area of 230,600 square kilometers (89,000 sq mi). The ecoregion lies east of the Andes in the lowlands of eastern Bolivia and the Brazilian states of Mato Grosso and Rondônia.

The World Wildlife Fund includes the Chiquitano dry forests in the Amazon biome. The ecoregion adjoins the Dry Chaco ecoregion to the south and the Pantanal ecoregion to the southeast. To the northeast it blends into the Cerrado ecoregion. To the northwest it adjoins the Madeira–Tapajós moist forests and Southwest Amazon moist forests ecoregions.

== Climate ==
The climate of the Chiquitano dry forests is tropical, with a strong dry season during the southern hemisphere winter. Average precipitation ranges between 1,000mm in the south and 2,000mm in the northwest, varying with orography.

== Flora ==
There are several common plant communities, or associations, which vary in structure and characteristic species. The forests of the region are adapted to the strong seasonal variation in rainfall, including wet-season flooding and dry-season fires. Many trees are deciduous, losing their leaves during the winter dry season, Deciduousness is more common in the semi-arid south.

The soto/curupaú association includes the trees soto (Schinopsis brasiliensis), curupaú (Anadenanthera macrocarpa), momoqui (Caesalpinia pluviosa), morado (Machaerium scleroxylon), roble (Amburana cearensis), and cedro (Cedrela fissilis). This association is found on well-drained soils. Trees form a canopy averaging 20 meters in height with emergent trees up to 30 meters. The canopy is 80% closed, and there is an understory of shrubs and herbs. Emergent soto trees are some of the largest in the forest, reaching up to 35 meters in height and living up to 500 years.

In the cuchi/curupaú association, either curupaú (Anadenanthera macrocarpa) or cuchi (Astronium urundeuva) predominates. It grows on well-drained but nutrient-poor soils, including rocky mountain slopes and sandy lowland soils. The canopy varies from 10 to 15 meters in height and is 65% closed, with emergent trees up to 25 meters high.

The cuta/ajo-ajo association is predominantly cuta (Phyllostylon rhamnoides) and ajo-ajo (Gallesia integrifolia). This association is found on seasonally-flooded soils near streams.

The tajibo/tusequi association is of Tajibo (Tabebuia heptaphylla) and tusequi (Machaerium hirtum). It forms patches of forest on low rises (half a meter to a meter) surrounded by open savanna.

The ecoregion also has areas of grassy savanna similar to the Cerrado savannas further east.

== Fauna ==
The ecoregion has 42 species of mammals, including marsh deer (Blastocerus dichotomus), white-lipped peccary (Tayassu pecari), giant armadillo (Priodontes maximus), jaguar (Panthera onca), maned wolf (Chrysocyon brachyurus), giant otter (Pteronura brasiliensis), and the rodent Goodfellow's tuco-tuco (Ctenomys goodfellowi).

Native birds include the black-and-tawny seedeater (Sporophila nigrorufa). Native reptiles include the broad-snouted caiman (Caiman latirostris).

== Conservation and protected areas ==
During the period from 2004 to 2011 the ecoregion experienced an annual rate of habitat loss of 0.62%.

In response to indigenous demands for control over their home territories, the Bolivian government issued a decree in 1990 designating indigenous territories in the lowlands, and acknowledging the rights of indigenous peoples to collectively govern those territories. A 1993 agrarian reform law acknowledged indigenous communities' collective land ownership and formalized Native Community Lands (called Tierras Comunitarias de Origen, or TCOs) as the vehicle for ownership, and the 1995 constitutional reform further guaranteed the rights of indigenous peoples to Native Community Lands. Portions of the dry forests are within TCOs. A 1996 reform of Bolivia's forestry law required forest management plans and forest inventories, established harvest limits, and guaranteed the rights of indigenous communities to manage timber harvesting on forest lands within TCOs, and to engage in customary forms of forest product harvesting without central government approval.

From August to November 2019, fires burned 1.4 million hectares of the dry forests, an estimated 12% of the Chiquitano forest area before the fires. Earlier in 2019 the Bolivian government issued a decree supporting clearance of forest lands in the Chiquitano and Amazon regions for cattle and soya production. Civil society organizations concluded the fires were mostly deliberately set by people seeking to clear land, and linked the increase in fires to the change in government policy. Those organizations and indigenous leaders petitioned the government to repeal the pro-clearance policies, better protect the forests, and uphold indigenous land rights.

A 2017 assessment found that 55,861 km², or 24%, of the ecoregion is in protected areas. Protected areas include Noel Kempff Mercado National Park and Ríos Blanco y Negro Wildlife Reserve in Bolivia.

== Sources ==
- "Intro: Amazon Ecoregions and Ecology", Global Forest Atlas, Yale University
- WildFinder, WWF: World Wildlife Fund
