= Gran Chaco =

Region of south-central Southern America

Gran Chaco Dry Chaco
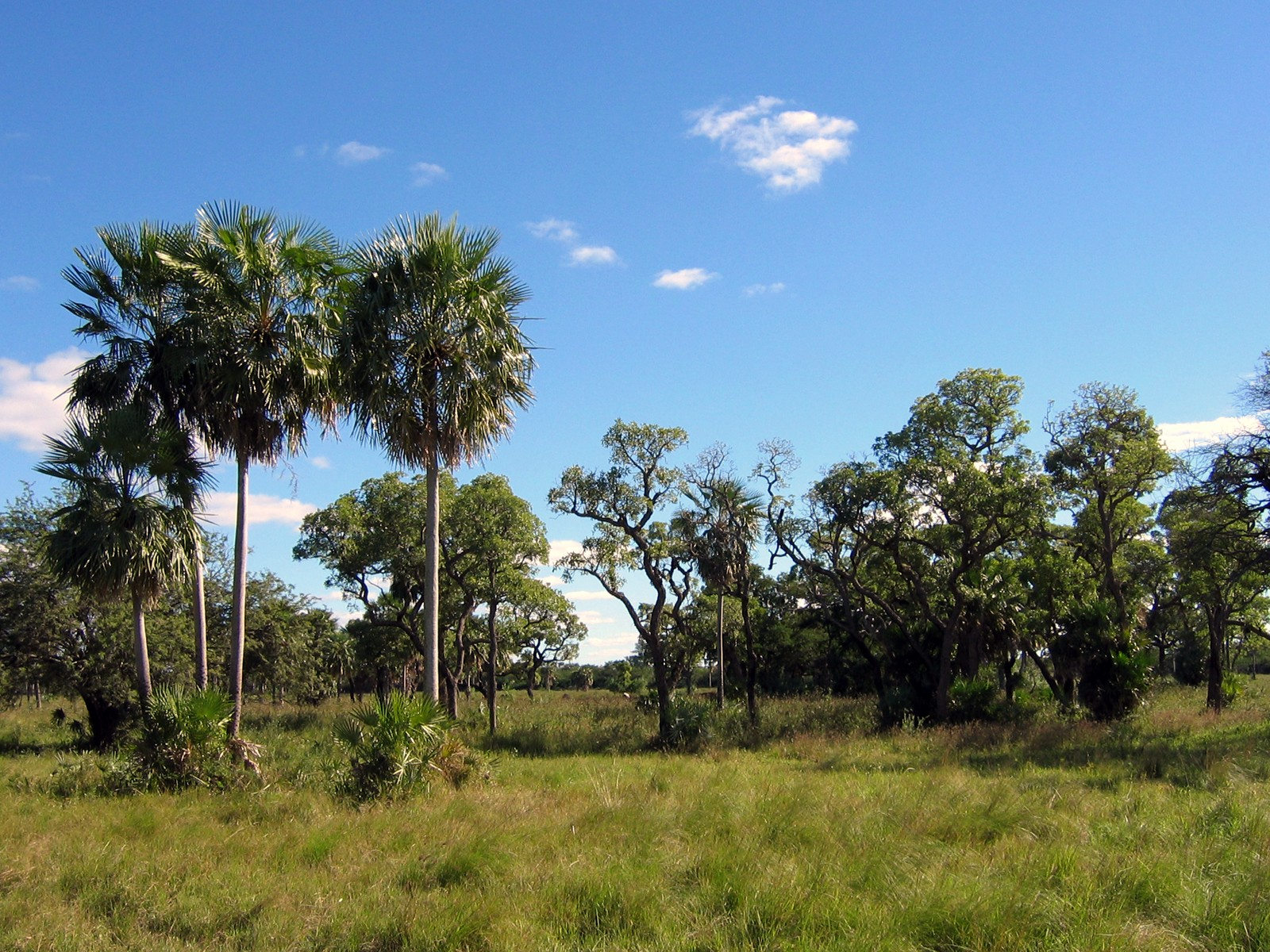
- Landscape in the Gran Chaco, Chaco Boreal, Paraguay

- Ecoregion territory (in purple)

Ecology
- Realm: Neotropical
- Biome: Tropical and subtropical dry broadleaf forests
- Borders: List: Argentine Espinal; Argentine Monte; Bolivian Yungas; Chiquitano dry forests; High Monte; Humid Chaco; Pantanal; Southern Andean Yungas

Geography
- Area: 786,791 km^{2} (303,782 mi^{2})
- Countries: Paraguay; Bolivia; Argentina; Brazil

Conservation
- Protected: 176,715 km^{2} (22%)

The Gran Chaco (also called Chaco or Chaco Plain) is a vast semiarid lowland region in central South America, spanning over one million square kilometres (390,000 sq mi) across eastern Bolivia, western Paraguay, northern Argentina, and parts of Brazil. It forms part of the Río de la Plata basin.

The Gran Chaco features a mix of tropical and subtropical dry broadleaf forests, thorn scrub, savannas, wetlands, and palm groves, making it the continent's second-largest forested ecoregion and a region of high ecological diversity.

The Gran Chaco is home to more than 3,400 plant species, around 500 bird species, 150 mammals, and more than 200 reptiles and amphibians, including jaguars, giant armadillos, peccaries, and maned wolves. Its forests and soils also store carbon and regulate water cycles, playing a significant role in climate moderation.

The region has been sparsely inhabited for centuries by Indigenous peoples, including the Wichí, Qom, Pilagá, Guaraní, and Ayoreo, among others. Today, it supports approximately 4 million people, many of whom maintain traditional livelihoods closely tied to the land.

In recent decades, the Gran Chaco has experienced extensive environmental degradation. Expanding cattle ranching, soybean farming, illegal logging, and fire-driven deforestation have led to the large-scale conversion of native forests. Argentina alone lost about seven million hectares of forest between 1998 and 2023, much of it in the Chaco. As of 2024, deforestation has continued to intensify.

Conservation efforts include the establishment of protected areas such as Kaa-Iya National Park in Bolivia, sustainable land-use initiatives, Indigenous-led stewardship programs, and local alliances for climate resilience. However, governance challenges, weak enforcement, and legal gaps continue to limit progress.

== Toponymy ==
The name Chaco comes from the Quechua word chaqu meaning "hunting land", an indigenous language from the Andes and highlands of South America, and comes probably from the rich variety of animal life present throughout the entire region.

== Geography ==
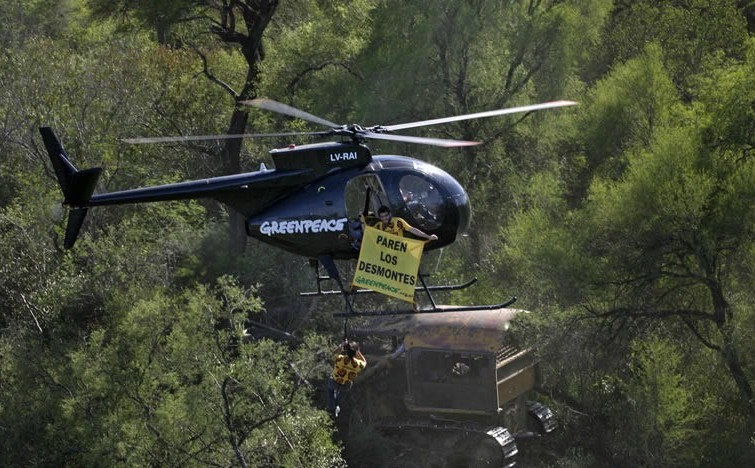
A bulldozer clearing native forest in the Chaco Boreal and environmentalists campaigning against it

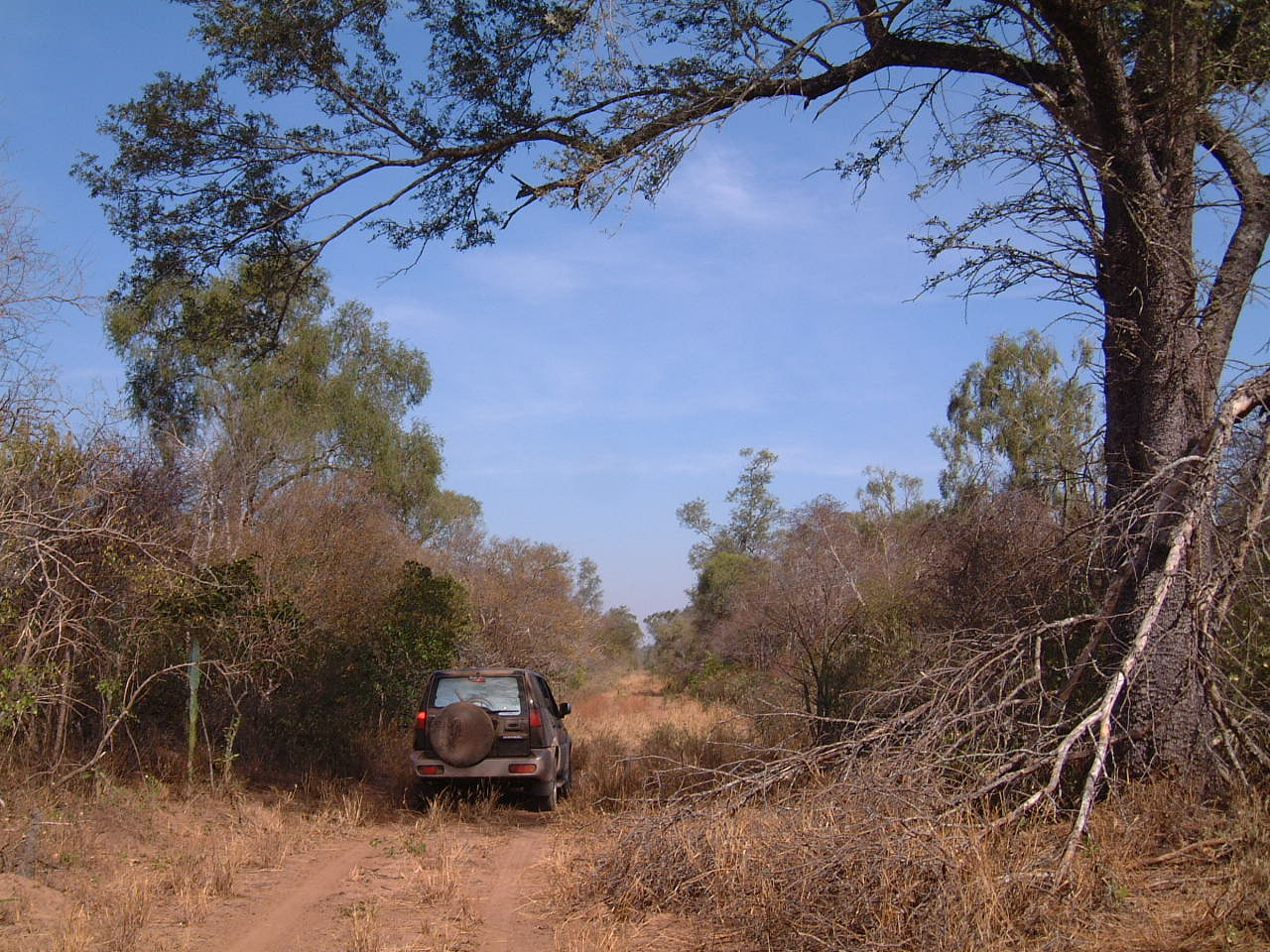
Alto Chaco, virgin forest in dry season

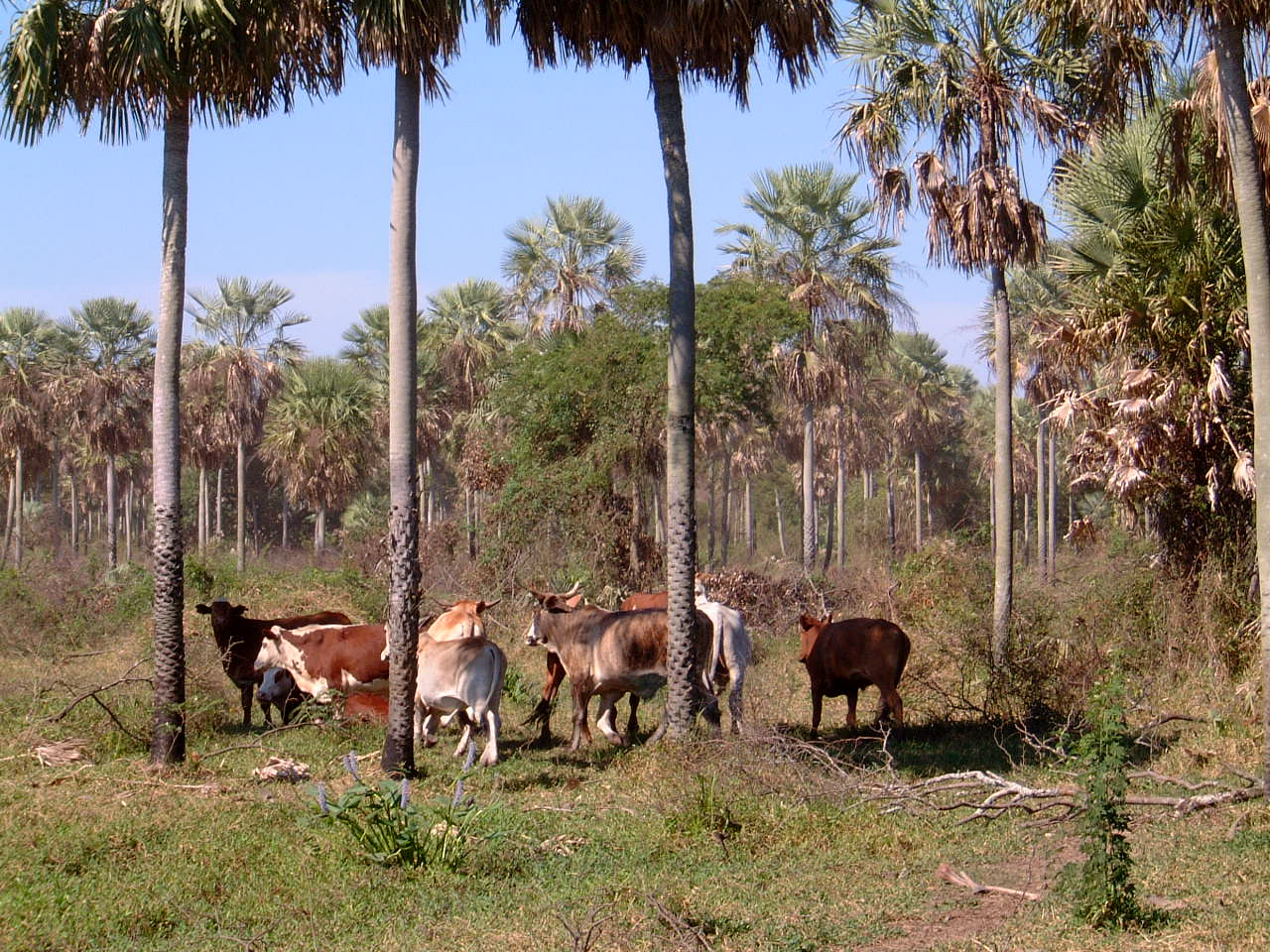
Bajo Chaco, extensive cattle ranching

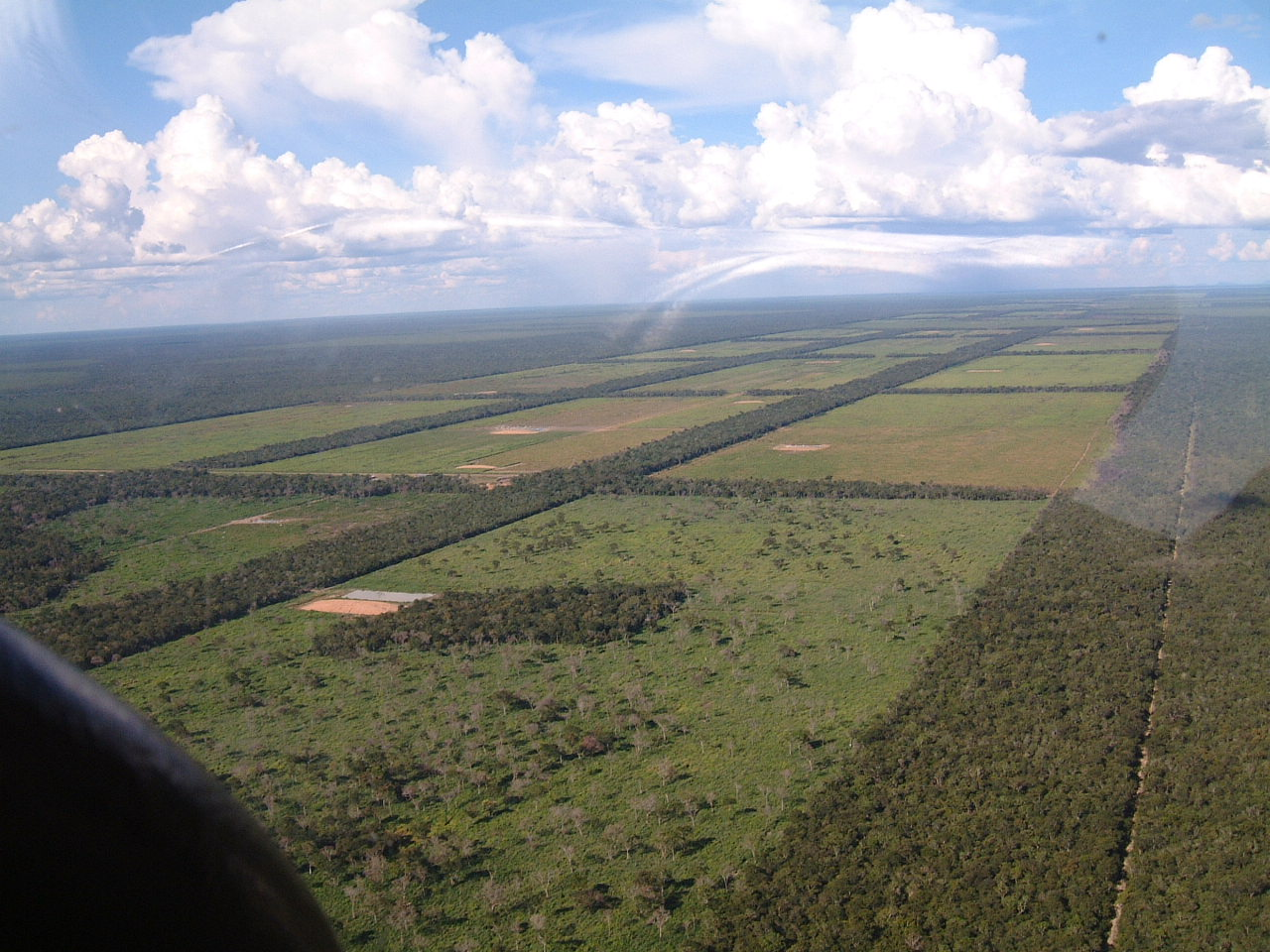
Deforestation for cattle farming in the Paraguayan part of the Chaco

The Gran Chaco is about 1,066,000 km^{2} in size, though estimates differ. The Gran Chaco ecoregion comprises the second largest forest in South America. It is located west of the Paraguay River and east of the Andes, and is mostly an alluvial sedimentary plain shared among Paraguay, Bolivia, and Argentina. It stretches from about 17 to 33°S latitude and between 65 and 60°W longitude, though estimates differ.

Historically, the Chaco has been divided in three main parts: the Chaco Austral or Southern Chaco, south of the Bermejo River and inside Argentinian territory, blending into the Pampa region in its southernmost end; the Chaco Central or Central Chaco between the Bermejo and the Pilcomayo River to the north, also now in Argentinian territory; and the Chaco Boreal or Northern Chaco, north of the Pilcomayo up to the Brazilian Pantanal, inside Paraguayan territory and sharing some area with Bolivia.

Locals sometimes divide it today by the political borders, giving rise to the terms Argentinian Chaco, Paraguayan Chaco, and Bolivian Chaco. (Inside Paraguay, people sometimes use the expression Central Chaco for the area roughly in the middle of the Chaco Boreal, where Mennonite colonies are established.)

The Chaco Boreal may be divided in two: closer to the mountains in the west, the Alto Chaco (Upper Chaco), sometimes known as Chaco Seco (or Dry Chaco), is very dry and sparsely vegetated. To the east, less arid conditions combined with favorable soil characteristics permit a seasonally dry higher-growth thorn tree forest, and further east still higher rainfall combined with improperly drained lowland soils result in a somewhat swampy plain called the Bajo Chaco (Lower Chaco), sometimes known as Chaco Húmedo (Humid Chaco). It has a more open savanna vegetation consisting of palm trees, quebracho trees, and tropical high-grass areas, with a wealth of insects. The landscape is mostly flat and slopes at a 0.004-degree gradient to the east. This area is also one of the distinct physiographic provinces of the Parana-Paraguay Plain division.

The areas more hospitable to development are along the Paraguay, Bermejo, and Pilcomayo Rivers. It is a great source of timber and tannin, which is derived from the native quebracho tree. Special tannin factories have been constructed there. The wood of the palo santo from the Central Chaco is the source of oil of guaiac (a fragrance for soap). Paraguay also cultivates mate in the lower part of the Chaco.

Large tracts of the central and northern Chaco have high soil fertility, sandy alluvial soils with elevated levels of phosphorus, and a topography that is favorable for agricultural development. Other aspects are challenging for farming: a semiarid to semihumid climate (600–1300 mm annual rainfall) with a six-month dry season and sufficient fresh groundwater restricted to roughly one-third of the region, two-thirds being without groundwater or with groundwater of high salinity. Soils are generally erosion-prone once the forest has been cleared. In the central and northern Paraguay Chaco, occasional dust storms have caused major topsoil loss.

== History ==
The Chaco was occupied by nomadic peoples, notably the various groups making up the Guaycuru, who resisted Spanish control of the Chaco, often with success, from the 16th until the early 20th centuries.

Prior to national independence of the nations that compose the Chaco, the entire area was a separate colonial region named by the Spaniards as Chiquitos.

The Gran Chaco had been a disputed territory since 1810. Officially, it was supposed to be part of Argentina, Bolivia, and Paraguay, although a bigger land portion west of the Paraguay River had belonged to Paraguay since its independence. Argentina claimed territories north of the Bermejo River until Paraguay's defeat in the War of the Triple Alliance in 1870 established its current border with Argentina.

Over the next few decades, Bolivia began to push the natives out and settle in the Gran Chaco, while Paraguay ignored it. Bolivia sought the Paraguay River for shipping oil out into the sea (it had become a land-locked country after the loss of its Pacific coast in the War of the Pacific), and Paraguay claimed ownership of the land. This became the backdrop to the Gran Chaco War (1932–1935) between Paraguay and Bolivia over supposed oil in the Chaco Boreal (the aforementioned region north of the Pilcomayo River and to the west of the Paraguay River). Eventually, Argentine Foreign Minister Carlos Saavedra Lamas mediated a ceasefire and subsequent treaty signed in 1938, which gave Paraguay three-quarters of the Chaco Boreal and gave Bolivia a corridor to the Paraguay River with the ability to use the Puerto Casado and the right to construct their own port. No oil was found in the region until 2012 when Paraguayan President Federico Franco announced the discovery of oil in the area of the Pirity river.

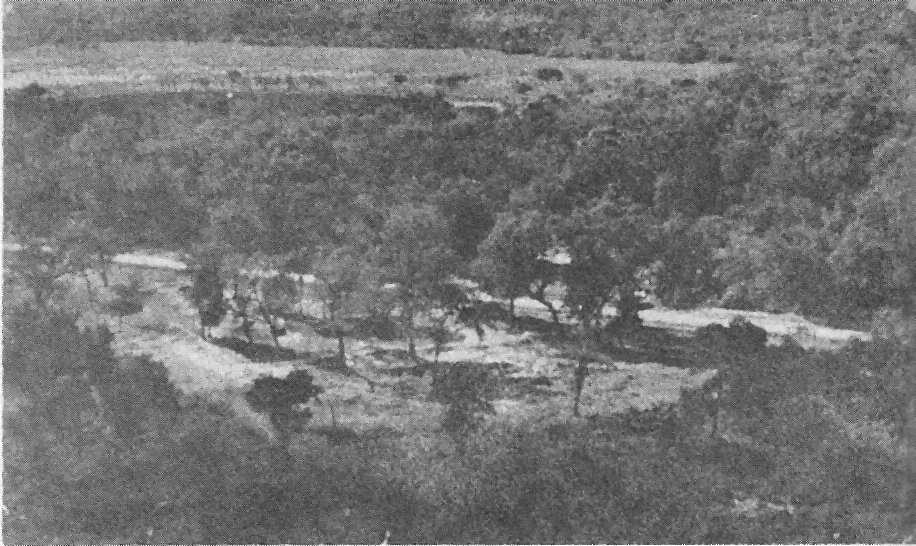
Road construction in the deep Gran Chaco during the 1960s

Mennonites immigrated into the Paraguayan part of the region from Canada in the 1920s; more came from the USSR in the 1930s and immediately following World War II. These immigrants created some of the largest and most prosperous municipalities in the deep Gran Chaco.

The region is home to over 9 million people, divided about evenly among Argentina, Bolivia, and Brazil, and including around 100,000 in Paraguay. The area remains relatively underdeveloped. In the 1960s, the Paraguayan authorities constructed the Trans-Chaco Highway and the Argentine National Highway Directorate, National Routes 16 and 81, in an effort to encourage access and development. All three highways extend about 700 km (430 mi) from east to west and are now completely paved, as is a network of nine Brazilian highways in Mato Grosso do Sul state.

== Flora ==
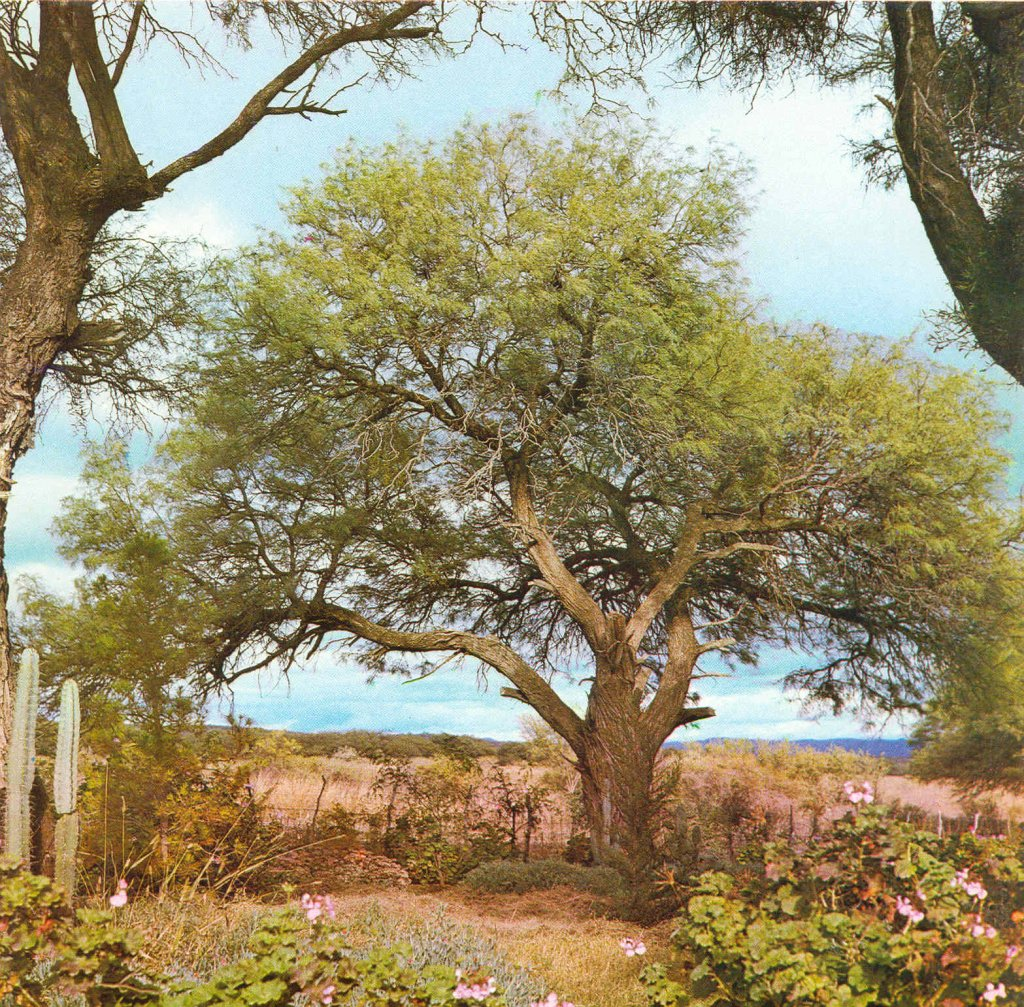
An Algarrobo, white carob tree, in the Gran Chaco area of Argentina. This prized shade tree is common to the area.

The Gran Chaco has some of the highest temperatures on the continent.

It has high biodiversity, containing around 3,400 plant species, 500 birds, 150 mammals, and 220 reptiles and amphibians.

The floral characteristics of the Gran Chaco are varied given the large geographical span of the region. The dominant vegetative structure is xerophytic deciduous forests with multiple layers, including a canopy (trees), subcanopy, shrub layer, and herbaceous layer. Ecosystems include riverine forests, wetlands, savannas, and cactus stands, as well.

At higher elevations of the eastern zone of the Humid Chaco, mature forests transition from the wet forests of southern Brazil. These woodlands are dominated by canopy trees such as Handroanthus impetiginosus and characterized by frequent lianas and epiphytes. This declines to seasonally flooded forests, at lower elevations, that are dominated by Schinopsis spp., a common plains tree genus often harvested for its tannin content and dense wood. The understory comprises bromeliad and cactus species, as well as hardy shrubs such as Schinus fasciculata. These lower areas lack lianas, but have abundant epiphytic species such as Tillandsia. The river systems that flow through the area, such as the Rio Paraguay and Rio Parana, allow for seasonally flooded semievergreen gallery forests that hold riparian species such as Tessaria integrifolia and Salix humboldtiana. Other seasonally flooded ecosystems of this area include palm-dominated (Copernicia alba) savannas with a bunch grass-dominated herbaceous layer.

To the west, in the Semiarid/Arid Chaco, medium-sized forests consists of white quebracho (Aspidosperma quebracho-blanco) and red quebracho (Schinopsis lorentzii) with a slightly shorter subcanopy made up of several species from the family Fabaceae, as well as several arboreal cacti species that distinguish this area of the Chaco. There is a scrub-like shrub and herbaceous understory. On sandy soils, the thick woodlands turn into savannas where the aforementioned species prevail, as well as species such as Jacaranda mimosifolia. The giant Stetsonia coryne, found throughout the western Semiarid/Arid region becomes very conspicuous in these sandy savannas. Various upland systems of plant associations occur throughout the Gran Chaco. The Highlands of the Argentinian Chaco are made up of, on the dry, sunny side (up to 1800m), Schinopsis haenkeana woodlands. The cooler side of the uplands hosts Zanthoxylum coco (locally referred to as Fagara coco) and Schinus molleoides (locally referred to as Lithrea molleoides) as the predominant species. Other notable species include Bougainvillea stipitata, and several species from the Fabaceae. The Paraguayan uplands have other woodland slope ecosystems, notably, those dominated by Anadenanthera colubrina on moist slopes. Both of these upland systems, as well as numerous other Gran Chaco areas, are rich with endemism.

== Fauna ==
Faunal diversity in the Gran Chaco is also high. The Gran Chaco has around 3,400 plant, 500 bird, 150 mammal, and 220 reptile and amphibian species. Animals typically associated with tropical and subtropical forests are often found throughout the eastern Humid Chaco, including jaguars, howler monkeys, peccaries, deer, and tapirs. Edentate species, including anteaters and armadillos, are readily seen as well. Being home to at least 10 species, the Argentinian Chaco is the location of the peak diversity for the armadillo, including species such as the nine-banded armadillo (Dasypus novemcinctus), whose range extends north to the southern US, and the southern three-banded armadillo (Tolypeutes matacus). The pink fairy armadillo (Chlamyphrous truncatus), is found nowhere else in the world. The giant armadillo (Priodontes maximus), while not found in the eastern Humid Chaco, can be seen in the drier Arid Chaco of the west. Some other notable endemics of the region include the San Luis tuco-tuco (Ctenomys pontifex). This small rodent is only found in the Argentinian Chaco. All of 60 species of Ctenomys are endemic to South America. The Chacoan peccary (Catagonus wagneri), locally known as tauga, is the largest of the three peccary species found in the area. This species was thought to be extinct by scientists until 1975, when it was recorded by Ralph Wetzel.

Due to the climate of the Gran Chaco, herpetofauna are restricted to moist refugia in various places throughout the chaco. Rotting logs, debris piles, old housing settlement, wells, and seasonal farm ponds are examples of such refugia. The black-legged seriema (Chunga burmeisteri), blue-crowned parakeet (Aratinga acuticadauta), Picui ground dove (Columbina picui), guira cuckoo (Guira guira), little thornbird (Phacellodomus sibilatrix), and many-colored Chaco finch (Saltaitricula multicolor) are notable of the 409 bird species that are resident or breed in the Gran Chaco; 252 of these Chaco species are endemic to South America.

== Conservation ==
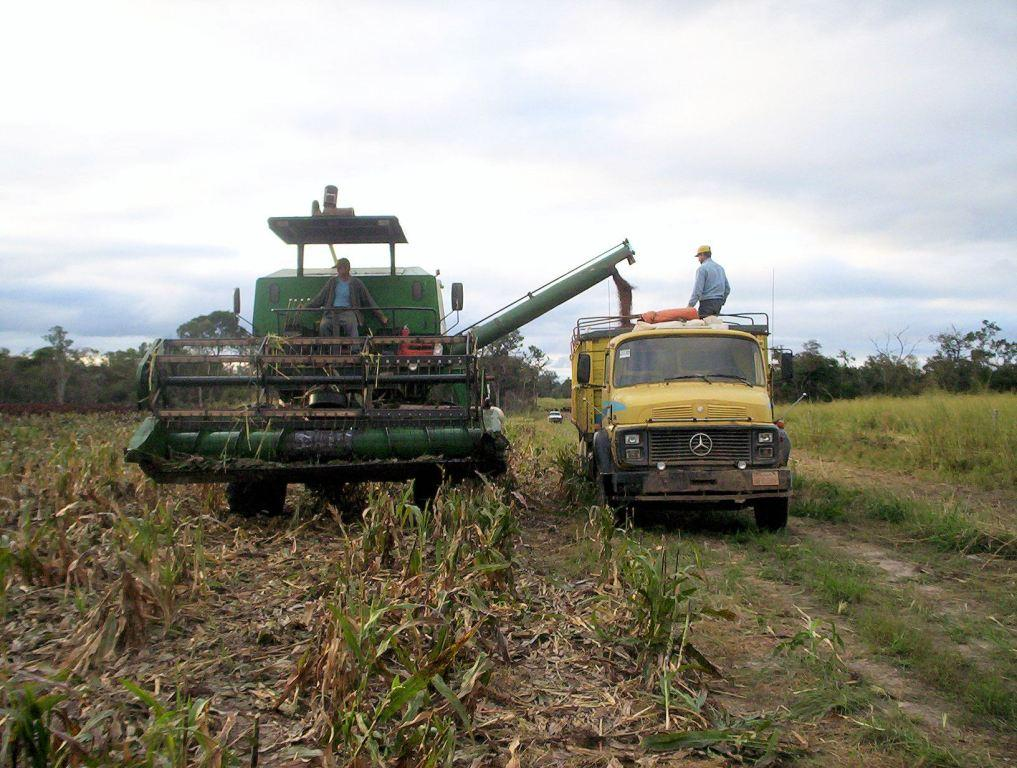
Sorghum harvest 2008, Linea 14, Agua Dulce Region, Alto Paraguay

The Gran Chaco is one of South America's last agricultural frontiers. Very sparsely populated and lacking sufficient all-weather roads and basic infrastructure (the Argentinian part is more developed than the Paraguayan or Bolivian part), it has long been too remote for crop planting. The central Chaco's Mennonite colonies are a notable exception. Between 2000 and 2019, it was estimated that the Dry Chaco forest cover decreased by 20.2%, including territory in Argentina, Bolivia, and Paraguay, with the latter showing the most dramatic land cover change.

Grasslands of the Gran Chaco have experienced intense woody encroachment, with detrimental impact on livestock economies, especially in the Formosa Province. Livestock pressure and the lack of wildfires have been main causes.

The region's suitability to grow fuel crops has the potential to exert significant pressure on the ecoregion. Suitability for the cultivation of Jatropha has been proven. Sweet sorghum as an ethanol plant may prove viable, too, since sorghum is a traditional local crop for domestic and feedstock use. The feasibility of switchgrass is currently being studied by Argentina's Instituto Nacional de Tecnología Agropecuaria, as is the Karanda'y palm tree in the Paraguayan Chaco. This is coupled with a challenge of low land valuations.

While advancements in agriculture can bring some improvements in infrastructure and employment for the region, loss of habitat and virgin forest is substantial and will likely increase poverty. Paraguay, after having lost more than 90% of its Atlantic rainforest between 1975 and 2005, is now losing its xerophytic forest (dry forests) in the Chaco at an annual rate of 220,000 hectares (540,000 acres) (2008). In mid-2009, a projected law, initiated by the Liberal Party, that would have outlawed deforestation in the Paraguayan Chaco altogether, "Deforestacion Zero en el Chaco", did not get a majority in the parliament.

The Gran Chaco has experienced the highest rate of deforestation in the world. Deforestation in the Argentinian part of the Chaco amounted to an average of 100,000 hectares (250,000 acres) per year between 2001 and 2007. According to Fundación Avina, a local NGO, on average, 1,130 ha (2,800 acres) are cleared per day. The soy plantations not only eliminate the forest, but also other types of agriculture. Indigenous communities are losing their land to agribusinesses. Since 2007, a law is supposed to regulate and control the cutting of timber in the Gran Chaco, but illegal logging continues.

Among the aggressive investors in the Paraguayan Gran Chaco are U.S.-based agribusinesses Cargill Inc., Bunge Ltd., and Archer Daniels Midland Co.

== Protected areas ==
A 2017 assessment found that 176,715 km^{2}, or 22%, of the ecoregion is in protected areas.

In September 1995, the Kaa-Iya del Gran Chaco National Park and Integrated Management Natural Area was established in an area of the Chaco in Bolivia. It is administered and was established solely by the indigenous peoples, including the Izoceño Guaraní, the Ayoreode, and the Chiquitano.

Other protected areas include Defensores del Chaco National Park and Tinfunqué National Park in Paraguay, and Copo National Park and El Impenetrable National Park in Argentina.

== Administrative divisions in the Gran Chaco ==
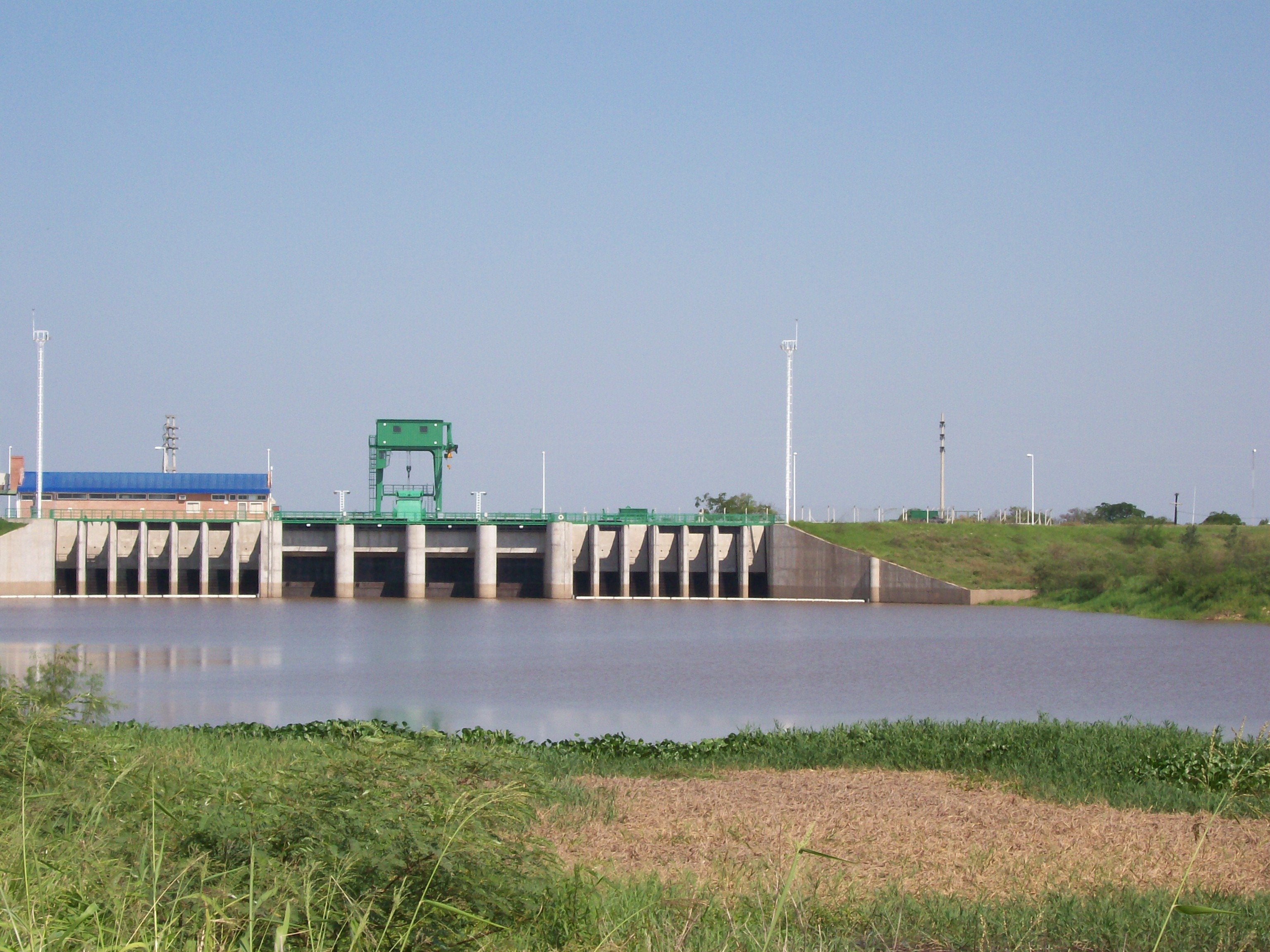
Dam on the Río Negro, near Resistencia, Chaco (Argentina); the torrential rains that follow the region's long dry season make flood-control works critical.

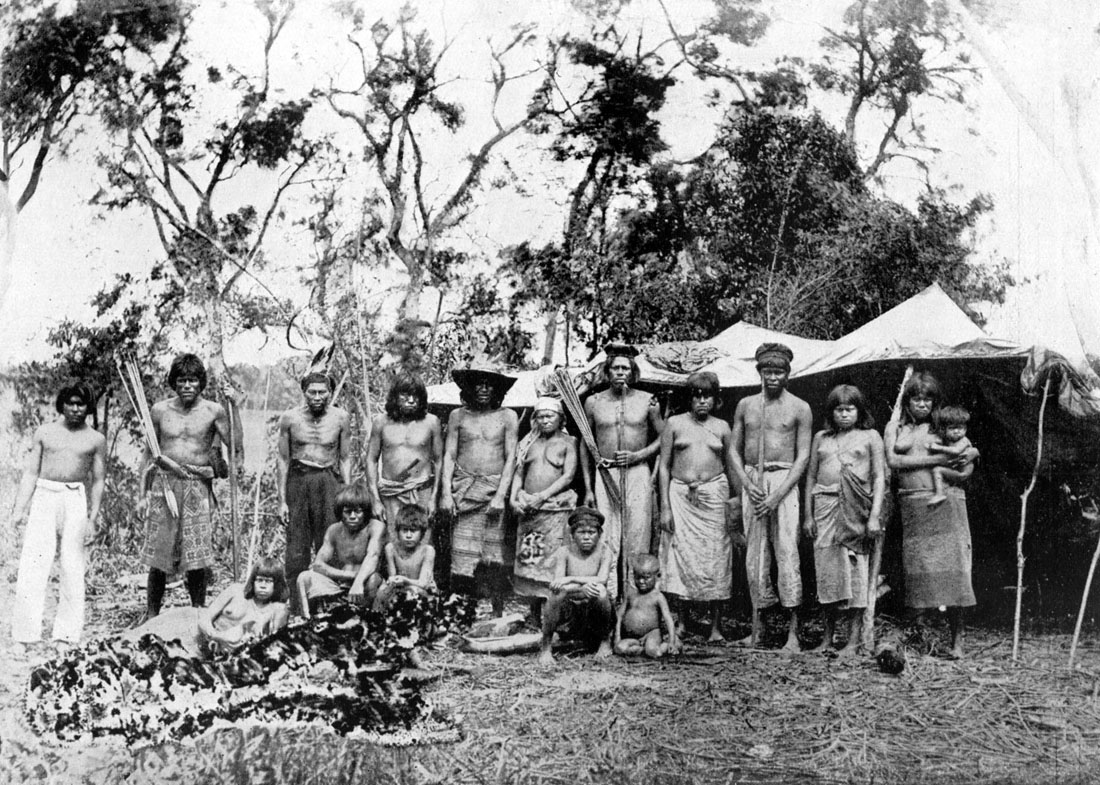
Toba family, Formosa Province, Argentina, 1892

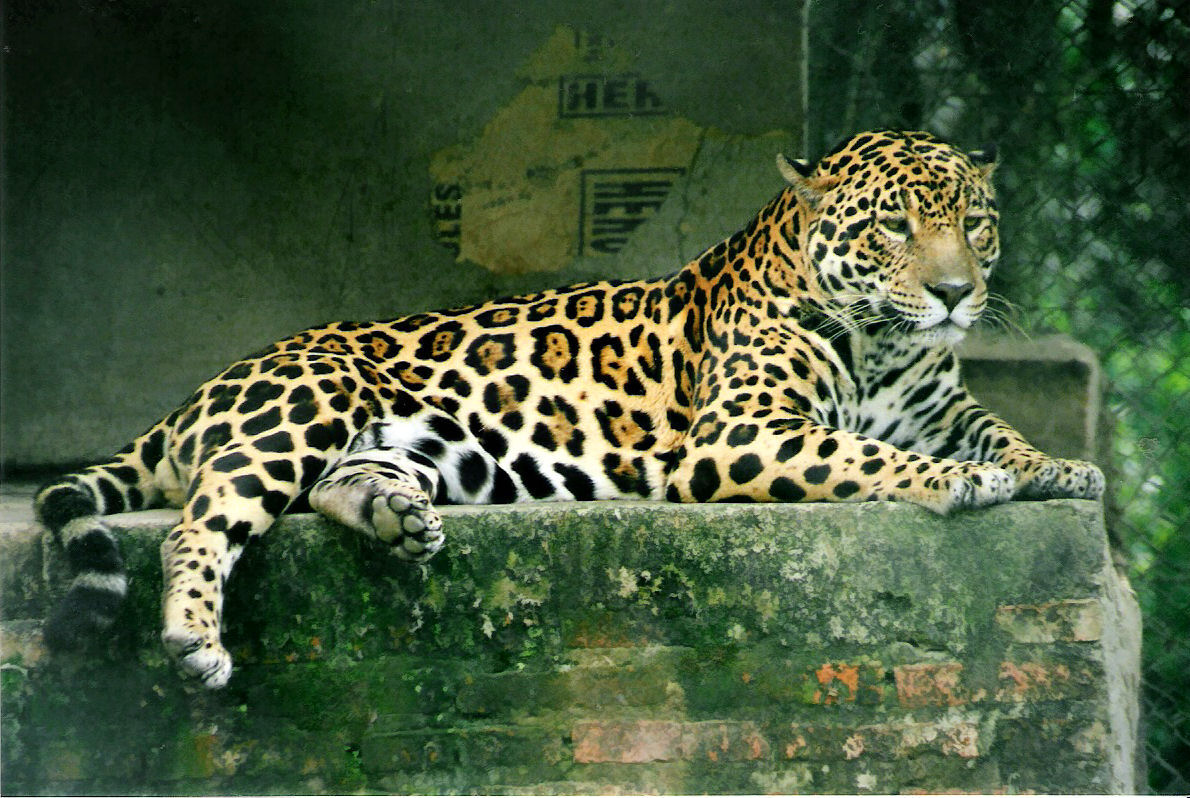
A jaguar at rest in the Formosa Province Wildlife Rehabilitation Center

The following Argentine provinces, Bolivian and Paraguayan departments, and Brazilian states lie in the Gran Chaco area, either entirely or in part.

Region	Nation
Chaco Province	Argentina
Córdoba Province	Argentina
Formosa Province	Argentina
Salta Province	Argentina
Santa Fe Province	Argentina
Santiago del Estero Province	Argentina
Tucumán Province	Argentina
Beni Department	Bolivia
Chuquisaca Department	Bolivia
Santa Cruz Department	Bolivia
Cochabamba Department	Bolivia
Tarija Department	Bolivia
Alto Paraguay Department	Paraguay
Boquerón Department	Paraguay
Presidente Hayes Department	Paraguay
State of Mato Grosso do Sul	Brazil

== Indigenous peoples ==
- Abipón, Argentina, historic group
- Angaite (Angate), northwestern Paraguay
- Ayoreo (Morotoco, Moro, Zamuco), Bolivia and Paraguay
- Chamacoco (Zamuko), Paraguay
- Chané, Argentina and Bolivia
- Chiquitano (Chiquito, Tarapecosi), eastern Bolivia
- Chorote (Choroti), Iyojwa'ja Chorote, Manjuy), Argentina, Bolivia, and Paraguay
- Guana (Kaskihá), Paraguay
- Guaraní, Argentina, Bolivia, Brazil, and Paraguay
  - Bolivian Guarani
    - Eastern Guarani (Chiriguano), Bolivia
    - Guarayo (East Bolivian Guarani)
  - Chiripá (Tsiripá, Ava), Bolivia
  - Pai Tavytera (Pai, Montese, Ava), Bolivia
  - Tapieté (Guaraní Ñandéva, Yanaigua), eastern Bolivia
  - Yuqui (Bia), Bolivia
- Guaycuru peoples, Argentina, Bolivia, Brazil, and Paraguay
  - Mbayá (Caduveo), historic
    - Kadiweu, Brazil
  - Mocoví (Mocobí), Argentina
  - Payaguá
  - Pilagá (Pilage Toba)
  - Toba (Qom, Frentones), Argentina, Bolivia, and Paraguay
- Kaiwá, Argentina and Brazil
- Lengua people (Enxet), Paraguay
  - North Lengua (Eenthlit, Enlhet, Maskoy), Paraguay
  - South Lengua, Paraguay
- Lulé (Pelé, Tonocoté), Argentina
- Maká (Towolhi), Paraguay
- Nivaclé (Ashlushlay, Chulupí, Chulupe, Guentusé), Argentina, and Paraguay
- Sanapaná (Quiativis), Paraguay
- Vilela, Argentina
- Wichí (Mataco), Argentina and Bolivia

Many of these peoples speak or used to speak Mataco–Guaicuru languages.

== See also ==
- Campo del Cielo
- Kaa-Iya del Gran Chaco National Park and Integrated Management Natural Area
- Tributaries of the Río de la Plata
