= Schinopsis heterophylla =

Scientific classification
- Kingdom: Plantae
- Clade: Tracheophytes
- Clade: Angiosperms
- Clade: Eudicots
- Clade: Rosids
- Order: Sapindales
- Family: Anacardiaceae
- Genus: Schinopsis
- Species: S. heterophylla

Binomial name
- Schinopsis heterophylla Ragonese & J.Castillo ex DC. (as Schinopsis aff. heterophylla)

Species of tree

Schinopsis heterophylla, the quebracho colorado mestizo, is a South American tree species in the genus Schinopsis. It is native to the Gran Chaco region of Paraguay and northeastern Argentina.
