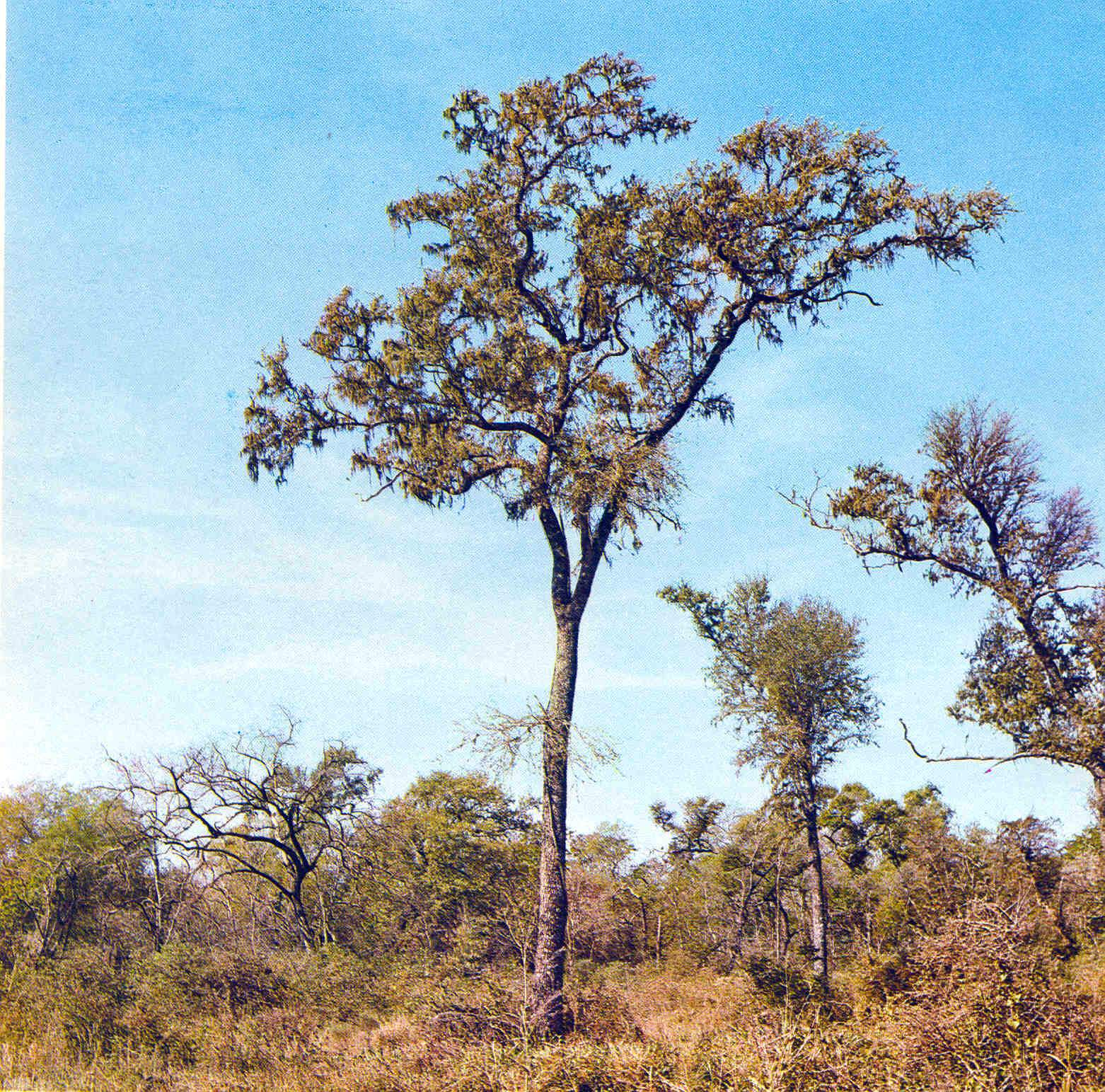
- Source: Libro del Árbol, Tome II, Celulosa Argentina S. A., Buenos Aires, Argentina. Credit: Mr. Jorge Vallmitjana

Conservation status
- Least Concern (IUCN 2.3)

Scientific classification
- Kingdom: Plantae
- Clade: Tracheophytes
- Clade: Angiosperms
- Clade: Eudicots
- Clade: Rosids
- Order: Sapindales
- Family: Anacardiaceae
- Genus: Schinopsis
- Species: S. balansae

Binomial name
- Schinopsis balansae Engl.

Synonyms
- Quebrachia morongii Britton; Schinopsis balansae var. pendula Tortorelli

= Schinopsis balansae =

Species of tree

Schinopsis balansae is a hardwood tree known as willow-leaf red quebracho which forms forests in the subtropical Humid Chaco ecoregion of north-eastern Argentina, and Paraguay. It is also found in the wild Pantanal vegetation in Brazil. Some of its vernacular names are quebracho colorado chaqueño and quebracho santafesino. Other species, like Schinopsis lorentzii, bear the general name quebracho and have similar properties and uses. S. balansae shares its habitat with a species of the same genus, S. heterophylla, and the two are often confused.

This tree can reach 24 metres in height and more than one metre in diameter. Its trunk is straight, with a brownish-gray bark. Its wood is extremely heavy (relative density = 1.2). Its main use is the extraction of quebracho extract, which is 63% pure tannin.

The tree was declared Argentina's "National Forest Tree" in 1956.

== Chemistry ==
Leuco-fisetinidin, a flavan-3,4-diol (leucoanthocyanidin) and a monomer of the condensed tannins called profisetinidins, can be extracted from the heartwoods of S. balansae.
