= Parauncinula =

Scientific classification
- Kingdom: Fungi
- Division: Ascomycota
- Class: Leotiomycetes
- Order: Helotiales
- Family: Erysiphaceae
- Genus: Parauncinula; S. Takam. & U. Braun, 2005

Type species
- Parauncinula septata (E.S. Salmon) S. Takam. & U. Braun, 2005

Genus of fungi

Parauncinula is a genus of fungi in the family Erysiphaceae. It is the earliest-diverging genus of powdery mildews and contains only four species, which were formerly classified in Uncinula. All of these species are endemic to East Asia and infect trees of the Fagaceae.

== Taxonomy ==
Parauncinula species were formerly assigned to Uncinula (Erysiphe), but due to the isolated position of these species at the base of the Erysiphaceae cluster they were placed in a separate genus by Takamatsu et al. (2005).

== Species ==
- Parauncinula curvispora (Hara) S. Takam. & U. Braun
- Parauncinula polyspora Meeboon & S. Takam.
- Parauncinula septata (E.S. Salmon) S. Takam. & U. Braun
- Parauncinula uncinata Meeboon & S. Takam.
