= Parauncinula uncinata =

Scientific classification
- Kingdom: Fungi
- Division: Ascomycota
- Class: Leotiomycetes
- Order: Helotiales
- Family: Erysiphaceae
- Genus: Parauncinula
- Species: P. uncinata

Binomial name
- Parauncinula uncinata Meeboon & S. Takam. 2017

Species of fungus

Parauncinula uncinata is a species of powdery mildew in the family Erysiphaceae. It is found on plants in the genus Quercus in Asia. It is known only from Japan.

== Description ==
The fungus forms effuse, evanescent mycelium on the leaves of its host. Parauncinula uncinata, like most Erysiphaceae, is highly host-specific and infects only Quercus variablilis.

== Taxonomy ==
The fungus was formally described in 2017 by Meeboon and Takamatsu. The specific epithet derives from the uncinate appendage tips.
