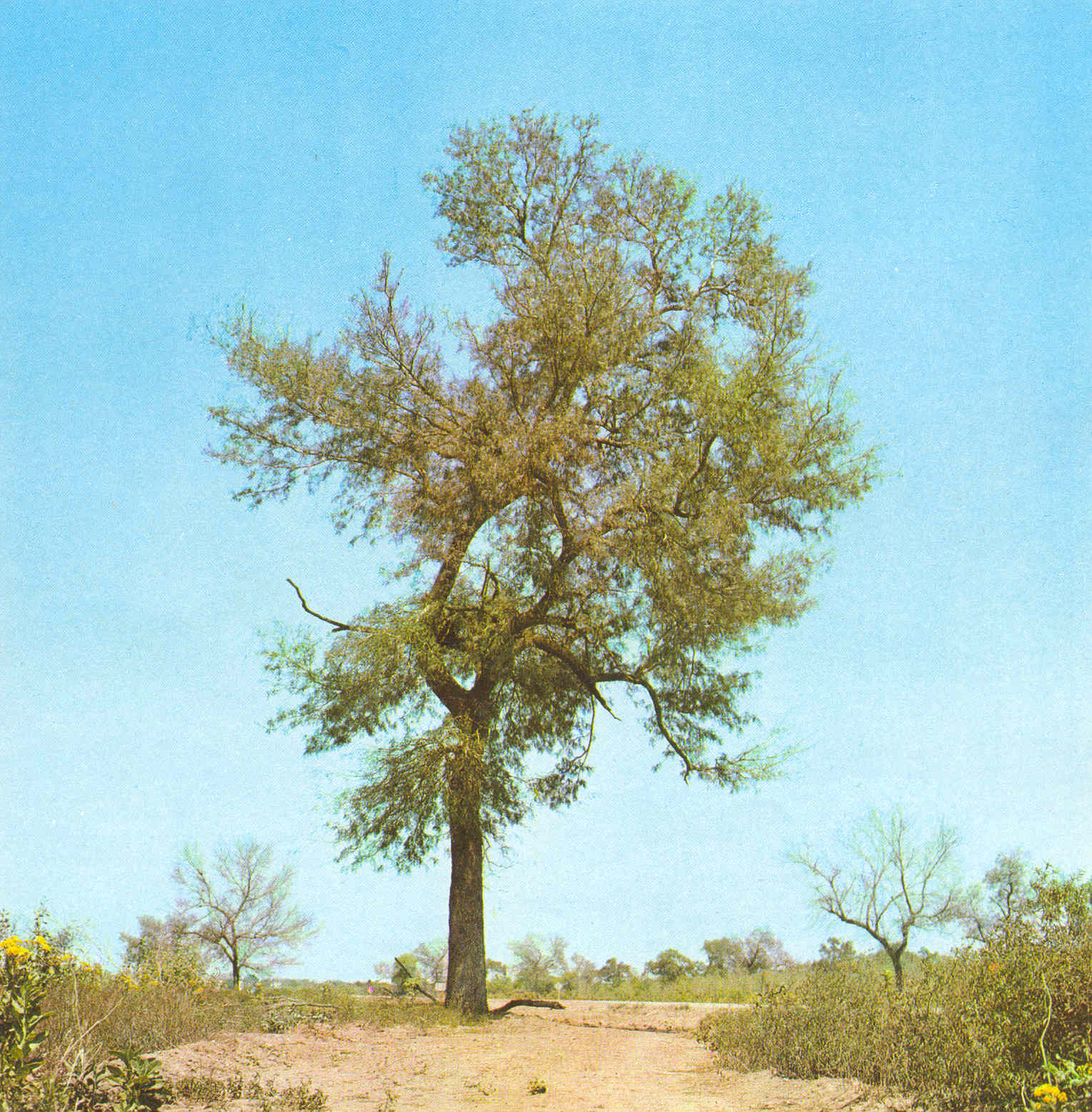

Scientific classification
- Kingdom: Plantae
- Clade: Tracheophytes
- Clade: Angiosperms
- Clade: Eudicots
- Clade: Rosids
- Order: Sapindales
- Family: Anacardiaceae
- Genus: Schinopsis
- Species: S. lorentzii

Binomial name
- Schinopsis lorentzii (Griseb.) Engl.

Synonyms
- Loxopterygium lorentzii Griseb.; Quebrachia lorentzii (Griseb.) Griseb.; Schinopsis haenkeana Engl.; Schinopsis lorentzii var. marginata (Engl.) Cabrera; Schinopsis marginata Engl.; Schinopsis quebracho-colorado (Schltdl.) F.A.Barkley & T.Mey.; Aspidosperma quebracho-colorado Schltdl.

= Schinopsis lorentzii =

Species of tree

Schinopsis lorentzii is a species of flowering plant in the family Anacardiaceae.

It is a hardwood tree known as red quebracho, native of the Paraguayan subtropical area, which forms forests in Gran Chaco region of Argentina, in Paraguay, and Bolivia. Some of its common names are coronillo, quebracho Cornillo (Brazil), quebracho chaqueño, quebracho colorado santiagueño, quebracho macho, and quebracho bolí. The qualification colorado ("red") differentiates it from other species of common quebracho tree, the Aspidosperma quebracho-blanco (quebracho blanco, "white quebracho", family Apocynaceae). The indication santiagueño (from Santiago del Estero) is made to distinguish it from quebracho colorado chaqueño, a closely related species (Schinopsis balansae).

It is considered a symbol of the Gran Chaco region. This tree is commercially very important due to its extremely hard and durable wood, and because of its tannin. The tanning industry has been exploiting quebracho forests for more than 100 years. This massive exploitation has led to the loss of 85% of the original Quebracho forests on in Argentina.
