= Schinopsis haenkeana =

Conservation status
- Vulnerable (IUCN 2.3)

Scientific classification
- Kingdom: Plantae
- Clade: Tracheophytes
- Clade: Angiosperms
- Clade: Eudicots
- Clade: Rosids
- Order: Sapindales
- Family: Anacardiaceae
- Genus: Schinopsis
- Species: S. haenkeana

Binomial name
- Schinopsis haenkeana Engl.

Species of tree

Schinopsis haenkeana is a species of plant in the family Anacardiaceae. It is found in Argentina and Bolivia. Its vernacular names include quebracho blanco, horco quebracho.
