= List of ecoregions in Argentina =

Ecoregions in Argentina

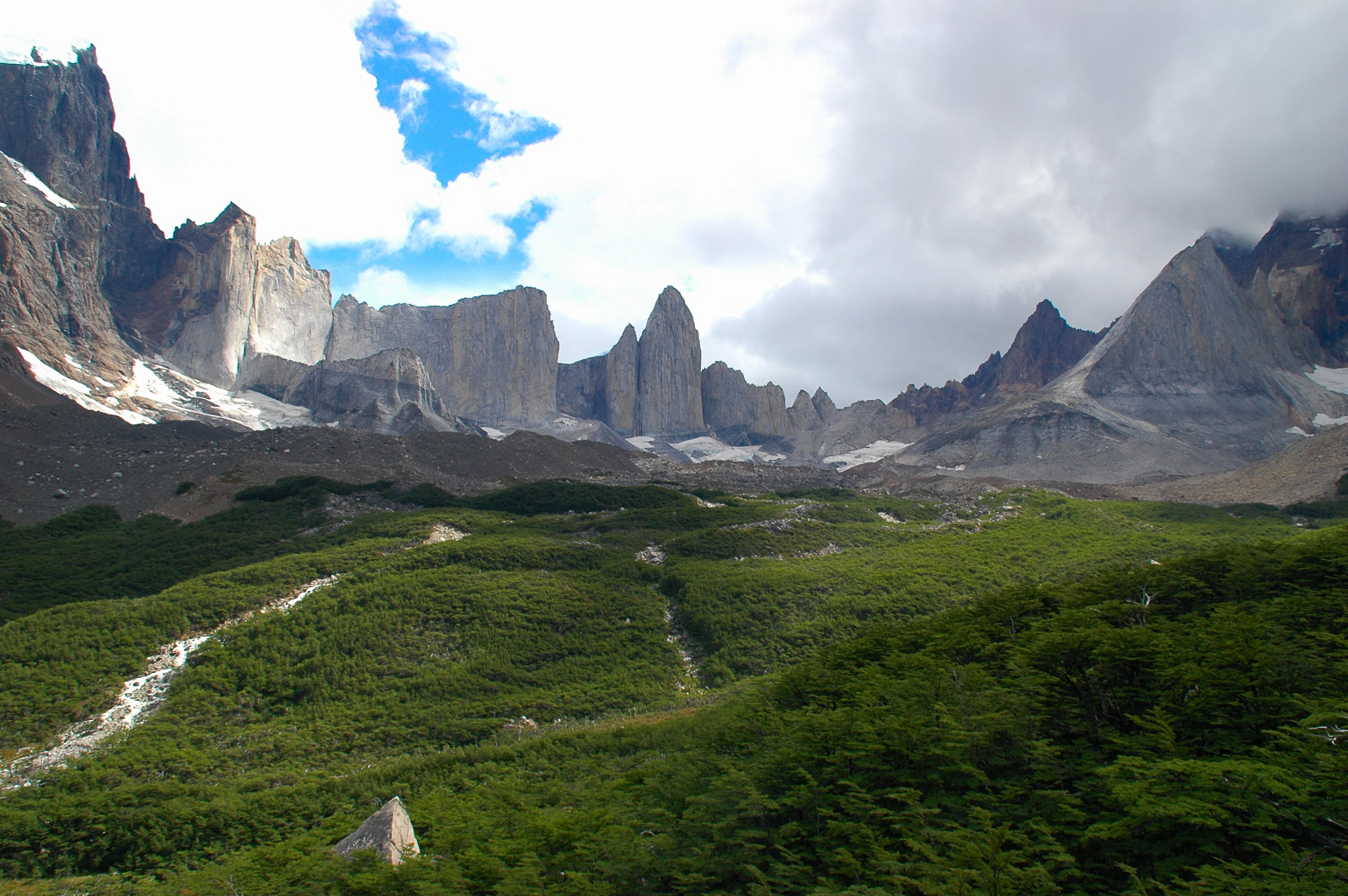
View of a Magellanic lenga forest close to the tree line in Torres del Paine National Park, Chile

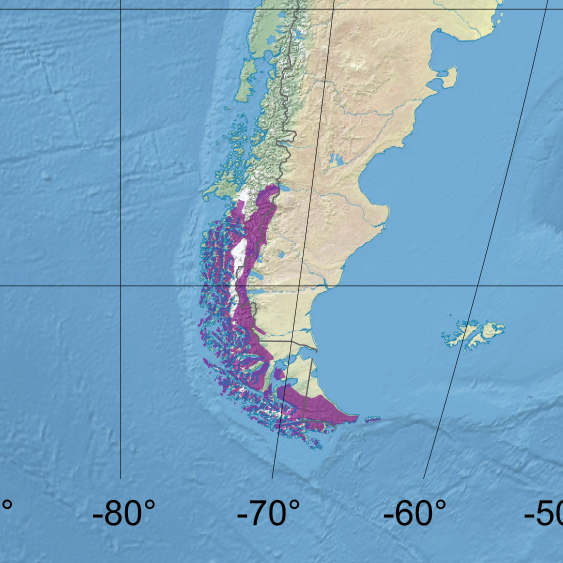
Magellanic subpolar forests

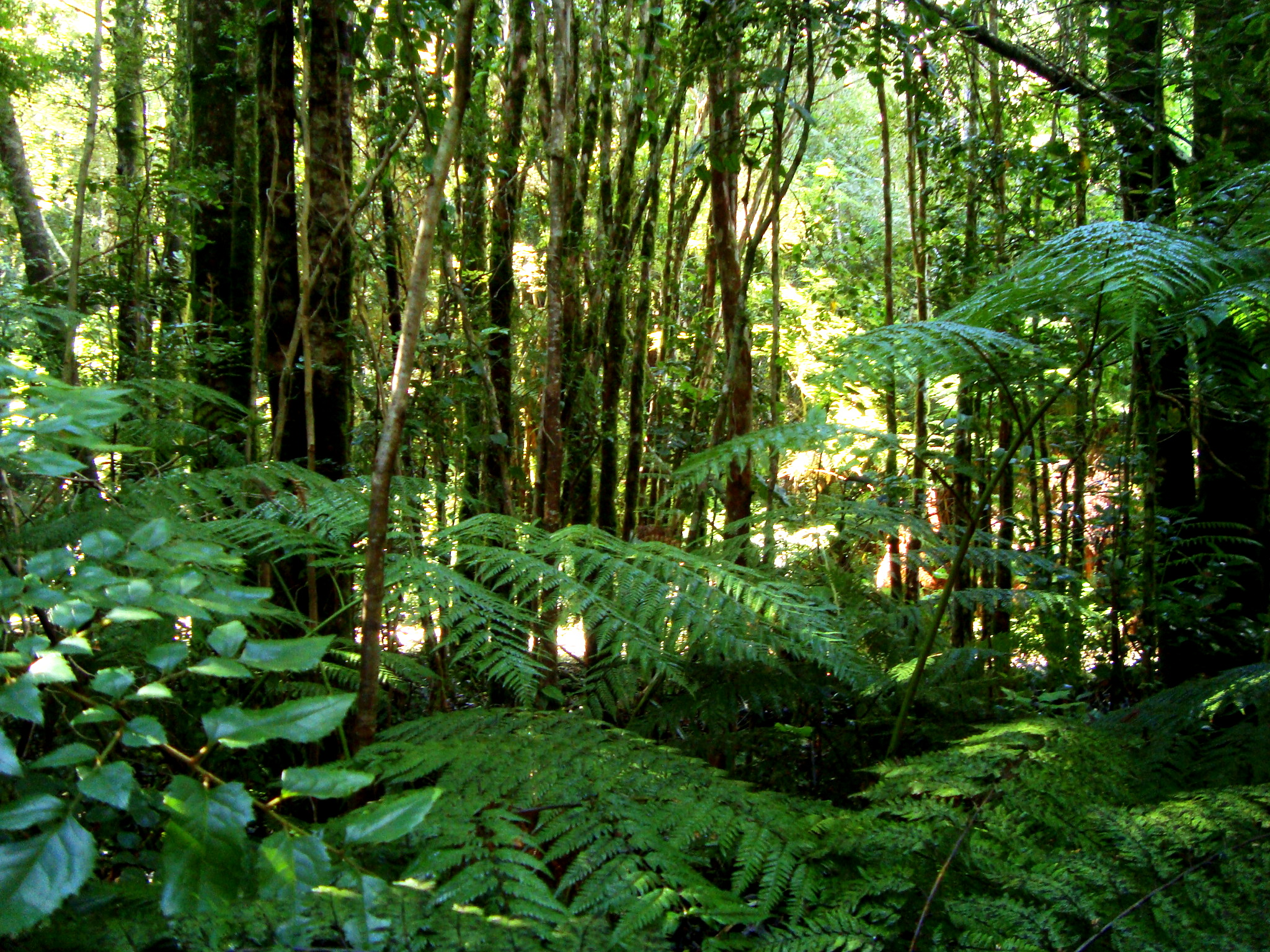
Trees and understory at Oncol Park

Valdivian temperate forests

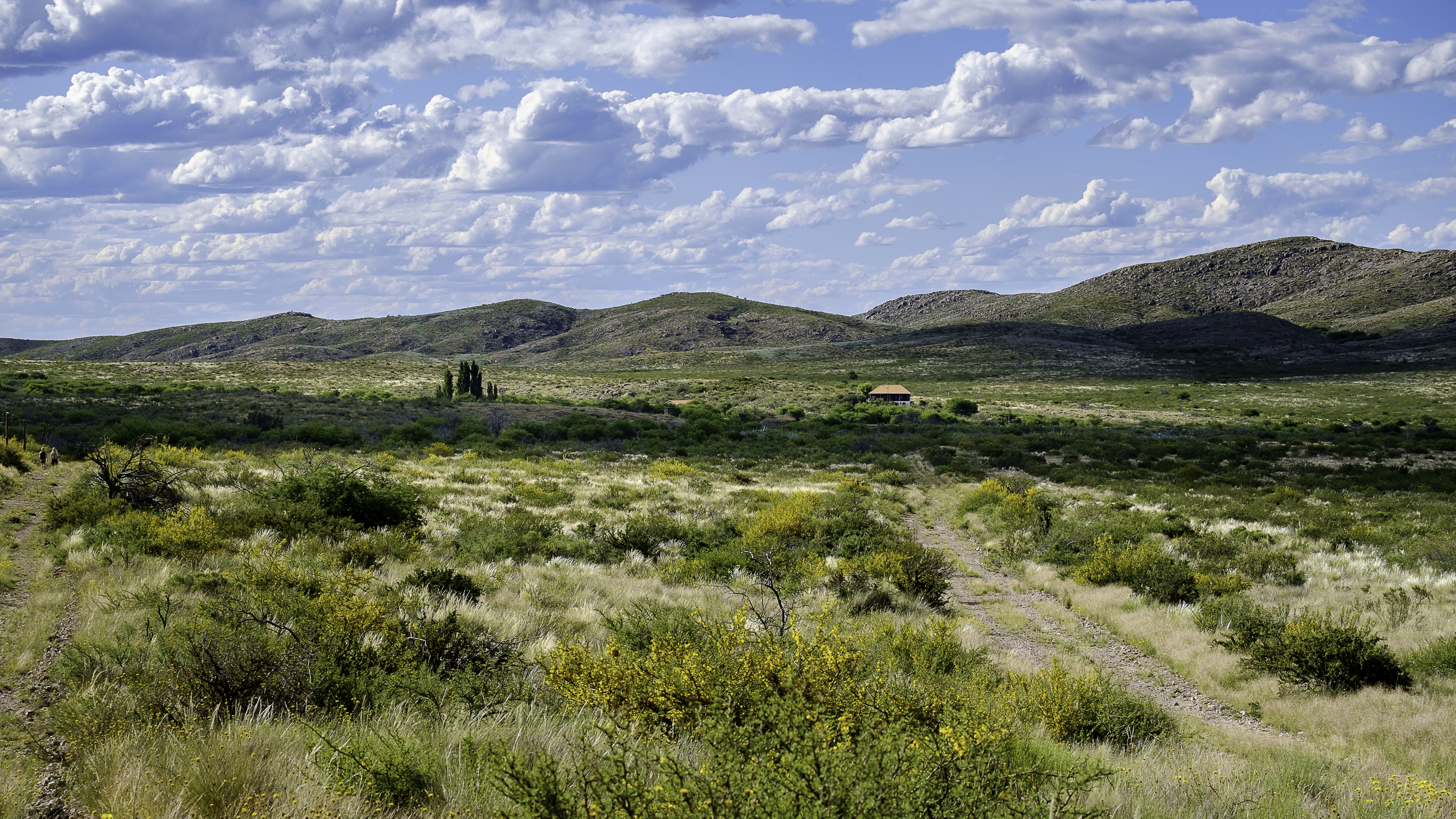
Lihué Calel National Park

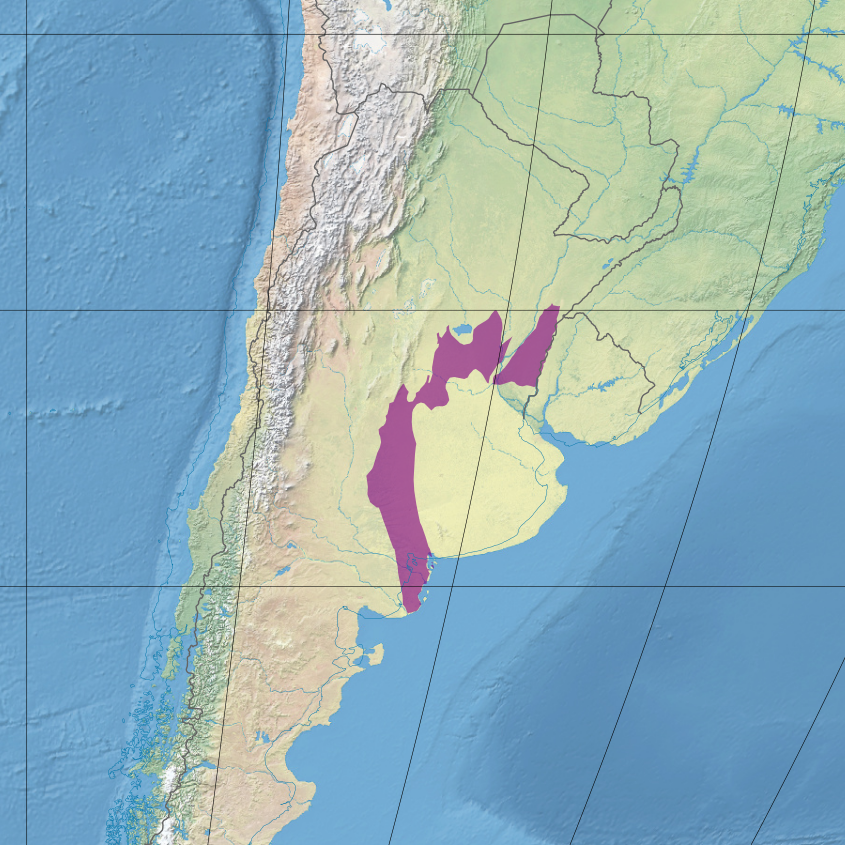
Argentine Espinal

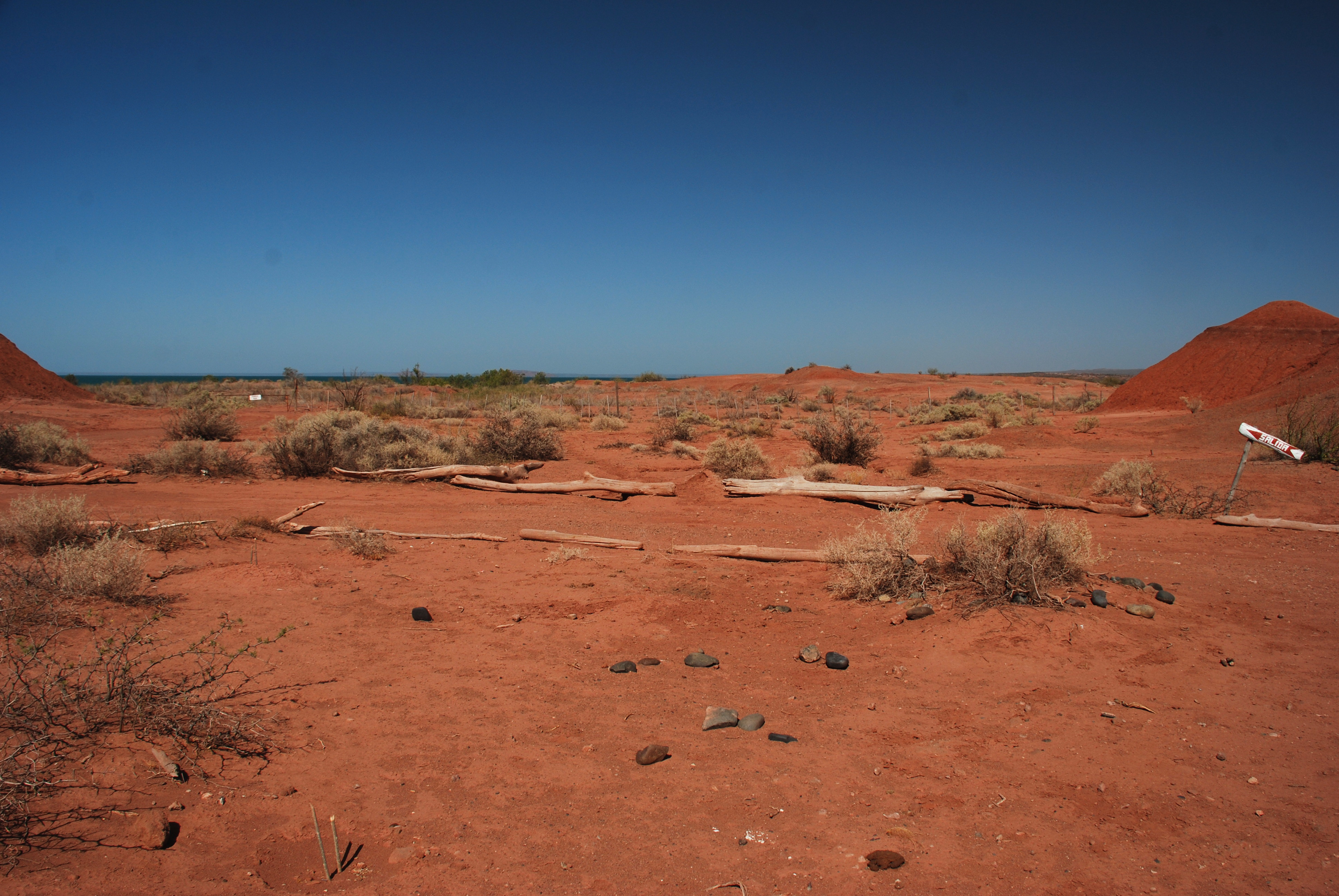
Desert near Barreales lake, Neuquén Province

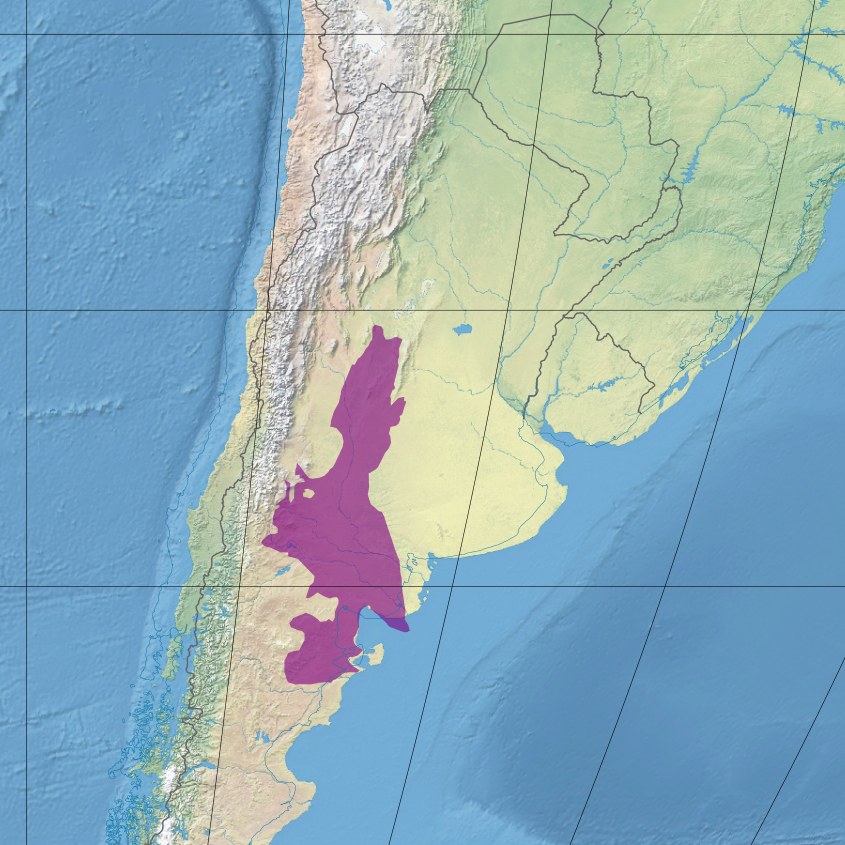
Argentine Monte

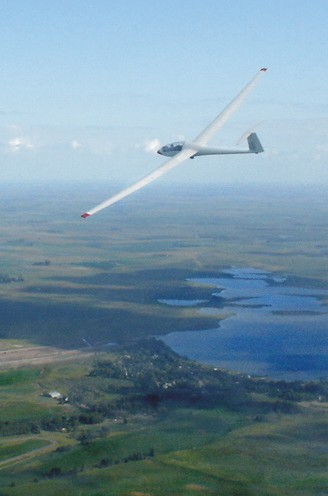
Sailplaning over the pampas

Humid Pampas

The following is a list of ecoregions in Argentina defined by the World Wide Fund for Nature (WWF).

Temperate broadleaf and mixed forests

- Magellanic subpolar forests
- Valdivian temperate forests

Temperate grasslands, savannas, and shrublands

- Argentine Espinal
- Argentine Monte
- Humid Pampas
- Patagonian grasslands
- Patagonian steppe
- Semi-arid Pampas

Tropical and subtropical dry broadleaf forests

- Dry Chaco

Montane grasslands and shrublands

- Central Andean dry puna
- Central Andean puna
- High Monte
- Southern Andean steppe

Tropical and subtropical grasslands, savannas, and shrublands

- Arid Chaco
- Córdoba montane savanna
- Humid Chaco

Tropical and subtropical moist broadleaf forests

- Alto Paraná Atlantic forests
- Araucaria moist forests
- Southern Andean Yungas

Flooded grasslands and savannas

- Paraná flooded savanna
- Southern Cone Mesopotamian savanna
