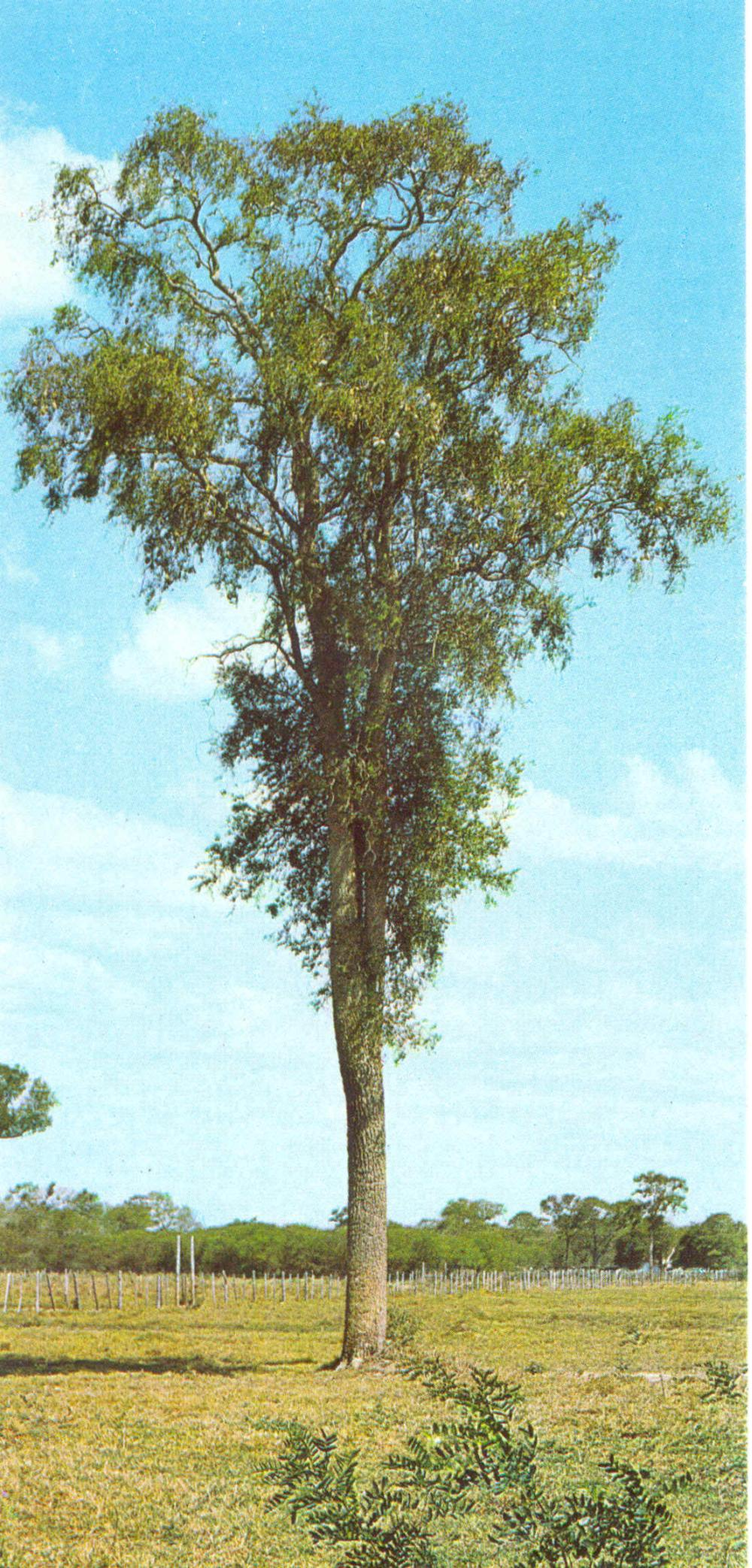

Conservation status
- Least Concern (IUCN 3.1)

Scientific classification
- Kingdom: Plantae
- Clade: Tracheophytes
- Clade: Angiosperms
- Clade: Eudicots
- Clade: Asterids
- Order: Gentianales
- Family: Apocynaceae
- Genus: Aspidosperma
- Species: A. quebracho-blanco

Binomial name
- Aspidosperma quebracho-blanco Schltr.

Synonyms
- Macaglia quebracho-blanco (Schltdl.) A.Lyons; Aspidosperma quebracho Griseb; Macaglia quebracho (Griseb.) Kuntze; Aspidosperma crotalorum Speg.

= Aspidosperma quebracho-blanco =

Species of tree

Aspidosperma quebracho-blanco, commonly known as Quebracho blanco, kebrako, or white quebracho, is a South American tree species, native to Brazil, northern Argentina, Bolivia, Paraguay, and Uruguay. It must not be confused with other species also known as quebracho, but belonging to the genus Schinopsis.

== Description ==
Aspidosperma quebracho-blanco is an evergreen tree. It reaches 20 to 30 meters in height in the Humid Chaco, and 8 to 12 meters in the Dry Chaco. The foliage is sclerophyllous.

== Habitat and range ==
Aspidosperma quebracho-blanco is generally found in dry deciduous forests, where it grows on clay soils. It is most common in the Gran Chaco, Humid Chaco, Argentine Espinal, and Bolivian montane dry forests ecoregions of Paraguay, Argentina, Bolivia, and Brazil. Its range extends to adjacent ecoregions, including the Uruguayan savanna, Paraná flooded savanna, Southern Cone Mesopotamian savanna, Southern Andean Yungas, Cerrado, Pantanal, Central Andean puna, Chiquitano dry forests, and Beni savanna.

== Timber ==
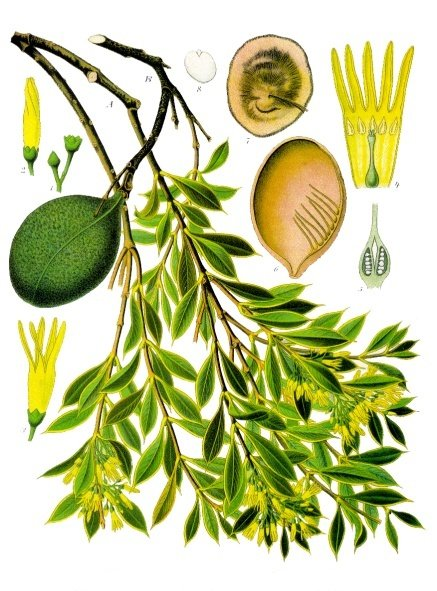
Aspidosperma quebracho-blanco

Quebracho blanco wood is uniformly yellow-ochre, without differences between hardwood and sapwood. It is quite heavy (relative density = 0.885 g/cm^{3}) and hard, and responds well to bending and shock. Upon drying it tends to collapse, producing deformations and cracks, so the drying process is slow; the wood must be treated with fungicides. It is easy to work and has many uses in carpentry (carts, wheels, floors, shoes, tool handles, furniture); it is also good for chess pieces, skis, etc. Preserved with creosote it can be used outdoors. In some places it is widely used as charcoal, since it does not produce sparks or large amounts of ash, and it burns strong and slowly.

== Other chemicals ==
Quebrachitol is a cyclitol, a cyclic polyol found in the bark of A. quebracho. Quebrachine is a chemical synonym for yohimbine since it was first isolated from the bark of A. quebracho-blanco.

== Cultivars ==
- 'Pendula' - with weeping branches.
