= Paraná flooded savanna =

South American ecoregion

Paraná flooded savanna (NT0908)
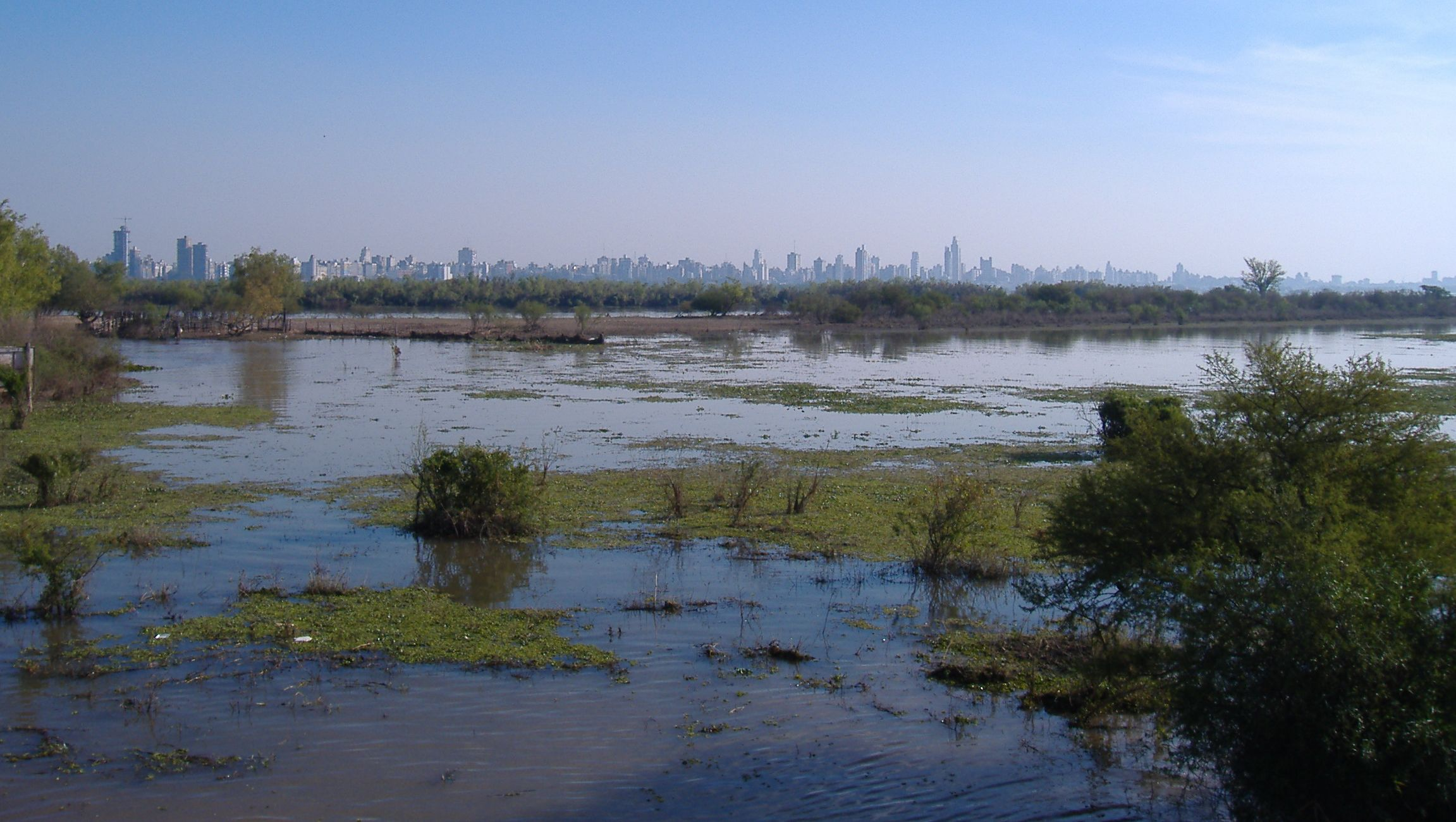
- Paraná River Delta at Rosario, Santa Fe, Argentina

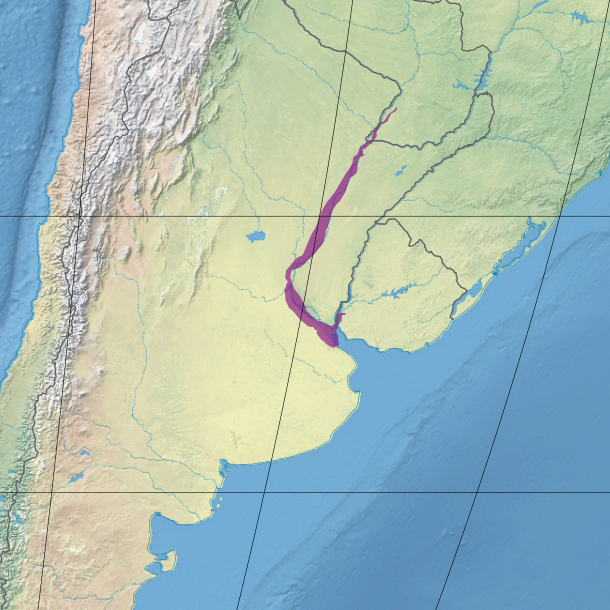
- Ecoregion territory (in purple)

Ecology
- Realm: Neotropical
- Biome: flooded grasslands and savannas
- Borders: Argentine Espinal; Humid Chaco, Humid Pampas

Geography
- Area: 38,850 km^{2} (15,000 sq mi)
- Countries: Argentina; Paraguay
- Coordinates: 29.456°S 59.618°W
- Climate type: Cfa: warm temperate, fully humid, hot summer

Conservation
- Conservation status: Critical/endangered

The Paraná flooded savanna (NT0908) is an ecoregion that borders the southern Paraná River in Argentina. It has largely been converted to agriculture or occupied by urban development, but scattered patches of the original habitat remain along the river.

== Location ==
The Paraná flooded savanna ecoregion has an area of 3,885,000 hectares (9,600,000 acres). It extends along the Paraná River valley from Resistencia, Chaco, south to Buenos Aires. It includes the middle and lower Paraná floodplains, and those of the Paraguay River, a major tributary of the Paraná. In the south it includes the Paraná delta and the basin of the Río de la Plata. The ecoregion consists of a strip of land that runs through the Humid Chaco ecoregion in the north. Further south it runs through the Espinal ecoregion and then the Humid Pampas ecoregion before reaching the Río de la Plata estuary.

== Physical ==
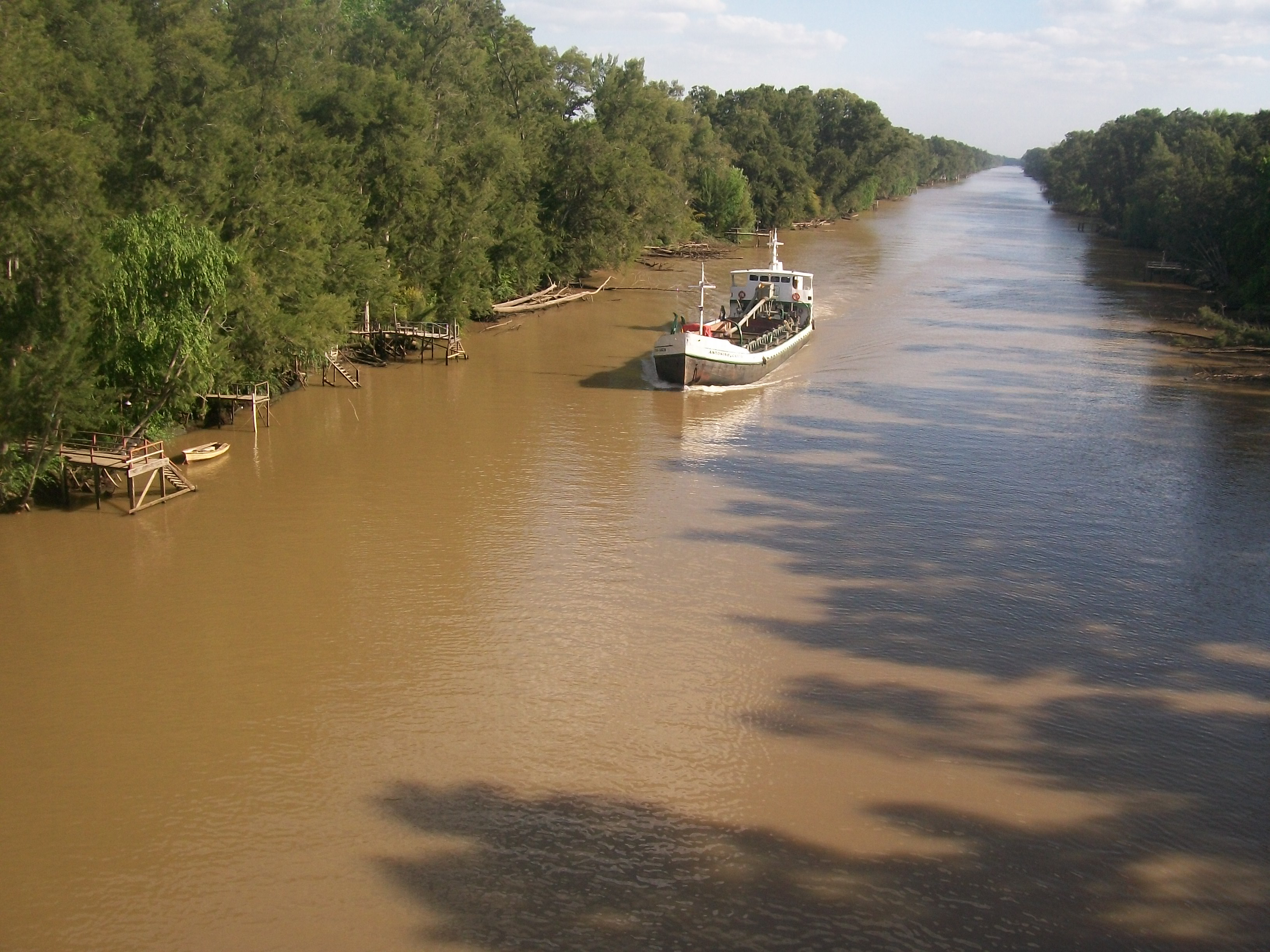
The Arias Canal in the Paraná Delta, north of Buenos Aires.

The region contains wide coastal lowlands, and low islands subject to flooding between the channels of the rivers. The large bodies of water give high humidity and temper the daily and seasonal temperature extremes. The Köppen climate classification is "Cfa": warm temperate, fully humid, hot summer. At a sample location at coordinates 31.25°S 59.75°W average annual temperature is 19 °C (66 °F). It is coolest in July with a mean temperature of 12.4 °C (54.3 °F) and warmest in January with a mean temperature of 25.4 °C (77.7 °F). Total rainfall averages about 1,100 millimetres (43 in). Monthly rainfall ranges from 30.1 millimetres (1.19 in) in July to 137.4 millimetres (5.41 in) in March.

== Ecology ==
The Paraná flooded savanna is in the Neotropical realm and in the flooded grasslands and savannas biome. At one time it was one of the largest areas of wetland and riverine habitat in South America.

=== Flora ===
Vegetation is characteristic of the Argentina's northeastern humid subtropical regions. It includes narrow strips of forest and shrub on land emerging from the water, scrub and pasture on islands, hydrophilic and aquatic flora on the river banks and in the channels, and lagoons within the islands. Tree species include Salíx humboldtiana, Tessaria integrifolia and Erythrina crista-galli. Water plants include species of the Eichhornia and Paederia genera, Victoria cruziana, Cyperus giganteus, Typha latifolia, Typha domingensis and Pontederia lanceolata.

=== Fauna ===
This ecoregion has considerable biodiversity. Mammals include agile gracile opossum (Gracilinanus agilis), coypu (Myocastor coypus) and Argentine swamp rat (Scapteromys aquaticus). Reptiles include the leopard keelback (Helicops leopardinus) and common green racer (Philodryas aestiva) snakes, Hilaire’s toadhead turtle (Phrynops hilarii) and Argentine snake-necked turtle (Hydromedusa tectifera). The Venezuela snouted treefrog (Scinax x-signatus) is present. Rare, endemic or endangered species include polka-dot tree frog (Hypsiboas punctatus), marsh deer (Blastocerus dichotomus), neotropical otter (Lontra longicaudis) and capybara (Hydrochoerus hydrochaeris). Endangered amphibians include blunt-headed salamander (Ambystoma amblycephalum) and red-spotted Argentina frog (Argenteohyla siemersi).

Birds include biguá (Phalacrocórax olivaceus), rufescent tiger heron (Tigrisoma lineatum), striped owl (Pseudoscops clamator), green kingfisher (Chloroceryle americana), great black hawk (Buteogallus urubitinga), roadside hawk (Rupornis magnirostris), dusky-legged guan (Penelope obscura), checkered woodpecker (Veniliornis mixtus), greater thornbird (Phacellodomus ruber), rufous-bellied thrush (Turdus rufiventris) and straight-billed reedhaunter (Limnoctites rectirostris). Endangered birds include yellow cardinal (Gubernatrix cristata), Chaco eagle (Buteogallus coronatus) and Eskimo curlew (Numenius borealis).

There are more than 300 species of fish, mostly Characiformes and catfish. Species of fish that attract tourists for sports fishing include spotted sorubim (Pseudoplatystoma corruscans), barred sorubim (Pseudoplatystoma fasciatum), paulicea Amazon catfish (Paulicea lutkeni), dorado (Salminus brasiliensis) and pirapitá (Brycon orbiginianus). Other economically valuable species include the streaked prochilod (Prochilodus lineatus) fish; pearly clams for ornaments; and the coypu, neotropical otter, capybara, caiman species and gold tegu (Tupinambis teguixi) for their skins and hides, and to a lesser extent their meat.

== Status ==
The World Wildlife Fund gives the ecoregion the status of "Critical/Endangered". The Paraná flooded savanna is now heavily populated and has mostly been converted to farmland or urban areas. There are scattered areas of the original habitat along the edge of the river in inaccessible area. Protected areas include the Cayastá Provincial Reserve, Del Medio-Los Caballos Provincial Reserve, Colonia Benitez Strict Natural Reserve and Vire-Pitá Provincial Reserve. The main threat comes from dams and levees. Urban growth, pollution and illegal commercial hunting for skins are also concerns.

== Sources ==
- Dellafiore, Claudia, Southern South America: Eastern Argentina (NT0908), WWF: World Wildlife Fund
- "Paraná flooded savanna", Global Species, Myers Enterprise II
- WildFinder, WWF: World Wildlife Fund
