= Chaco National Park =

National park of Argentina

- IUCN category II (national park)
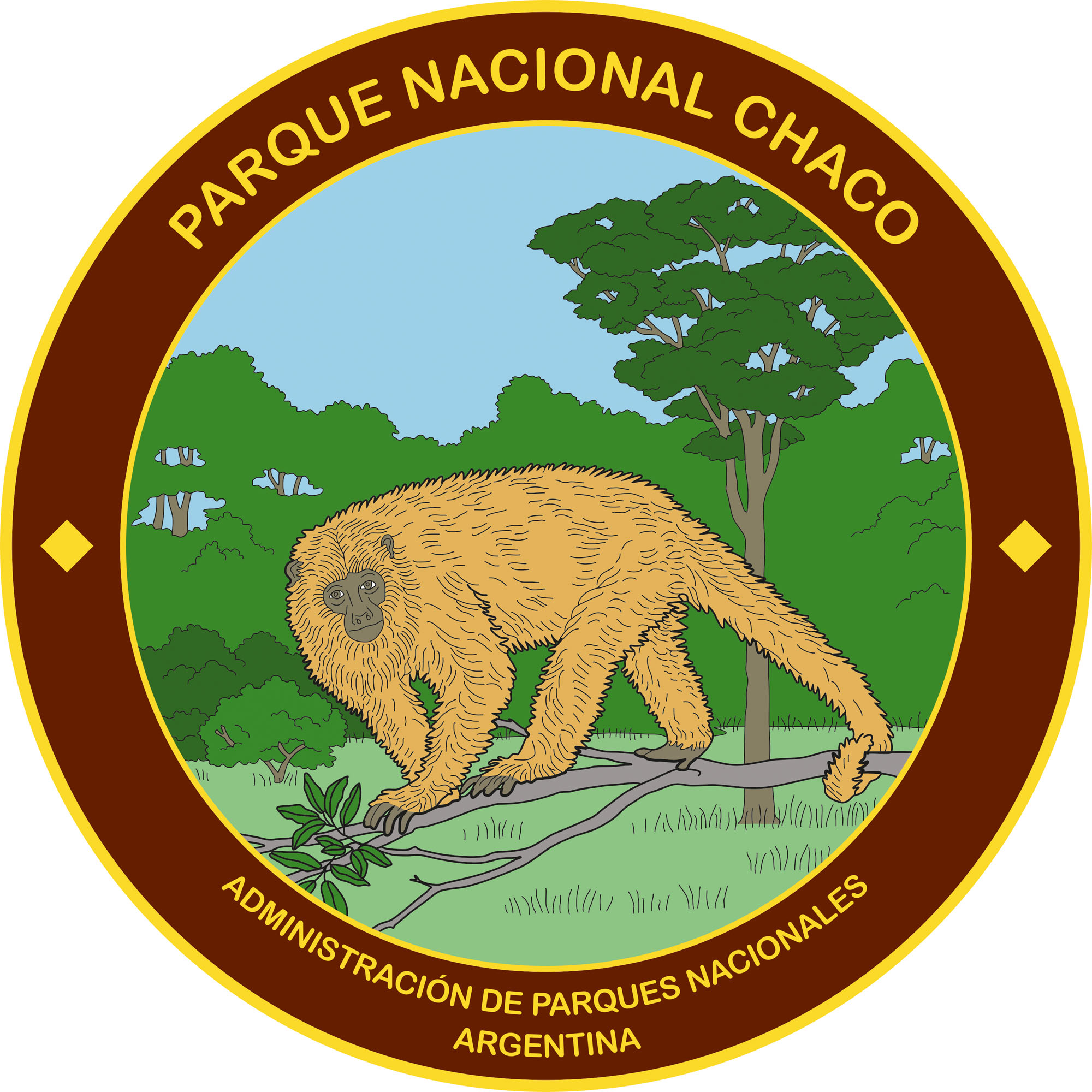
- Emblem of the Chaco National Park

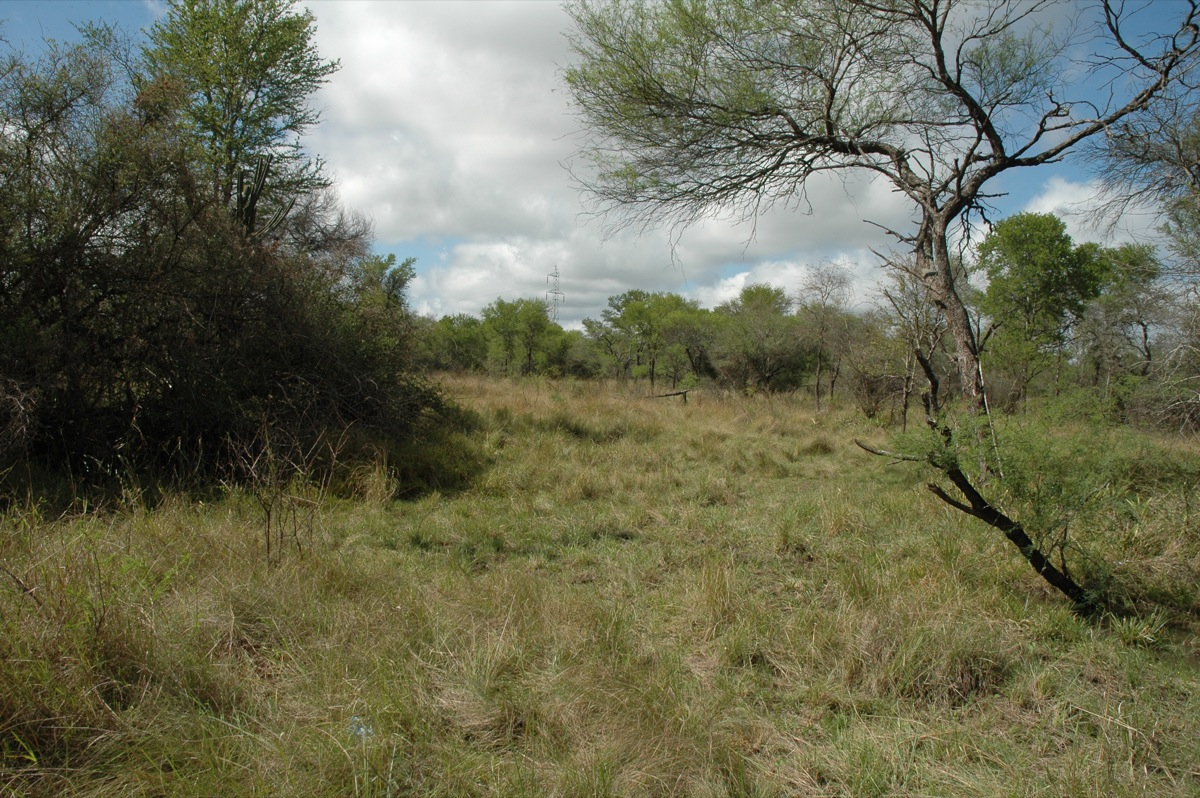
- The Humid Chaco in the park

- Location within Argentina
- Location: Chaco Province, Argentina
- Coordinates: 26°50′S 59°40′W
- Area: 150 km^{2} (58 sq mi)
- Established: 1954
- Governing body: Administración de Parques Nacionales

The Chaco National Park (Spanish: Parque Nacional Chaco) is a national park of Argentina, located in the province of Chaco. It has an area of 150 km^{2}. It was created in 1954 in order to protect a sample of the Eastern Chaco, composed mainly of warm lowlands, with an annual summer rainfall between 750 and 1,300 mm.

This park is a protected area for the quebracho trees. Forests of quebracho colorado chaqueño (Schinopsis balansae) were once located in the north of Santa Fe and the western half of Chaco, and had entered the northeast region of the province of Corrientes. Its strong wood and its abundant tannin caused it to be over-exploited for a century.

The area harbors several environments: scrubland, savanna, swamps, and small lakes. The scrubland is the habitat of the red quebracho (Schinopsis lorentzii), white quebracho (Aspidosperma quebracho-blanco), algarrobo (Prosopis alba), and lapacho (Tabebuia spp.), all of which are commercially valuable species. The fauna includes large predators such as cougars. In the lakes one finds yacare caimans and capybaras. Elsewhere there are armadillos, South American tapirs and plains viscachas, as well as birds (more than 340 species). The fauna also includes the black howler monkey (Alouatta caraya).

Indigenous communities of the Mocoví and Toba peoples are found in the protected area.

== Gallery ==
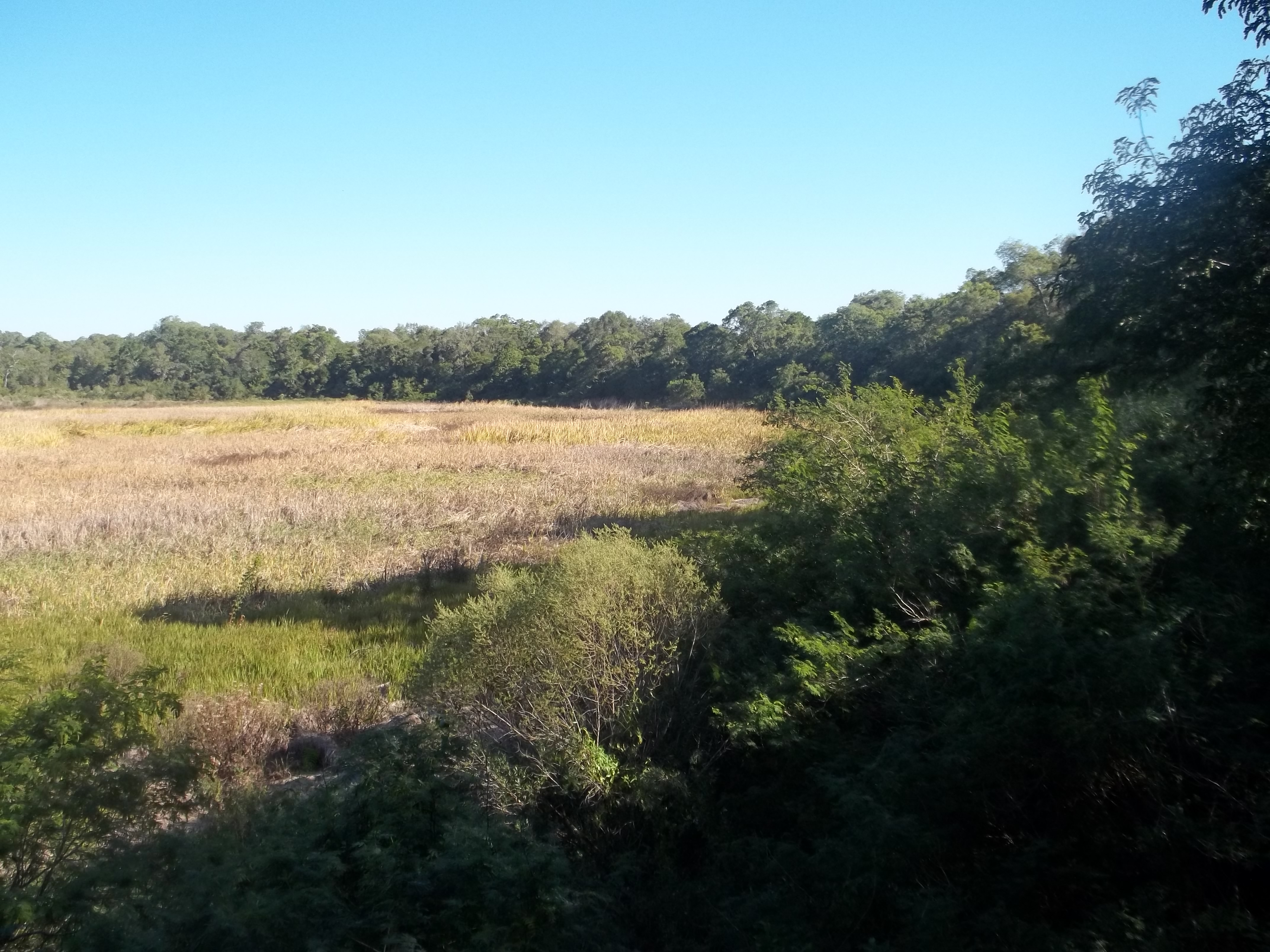
Carpincho Lagoon and the jungle that surrounds it

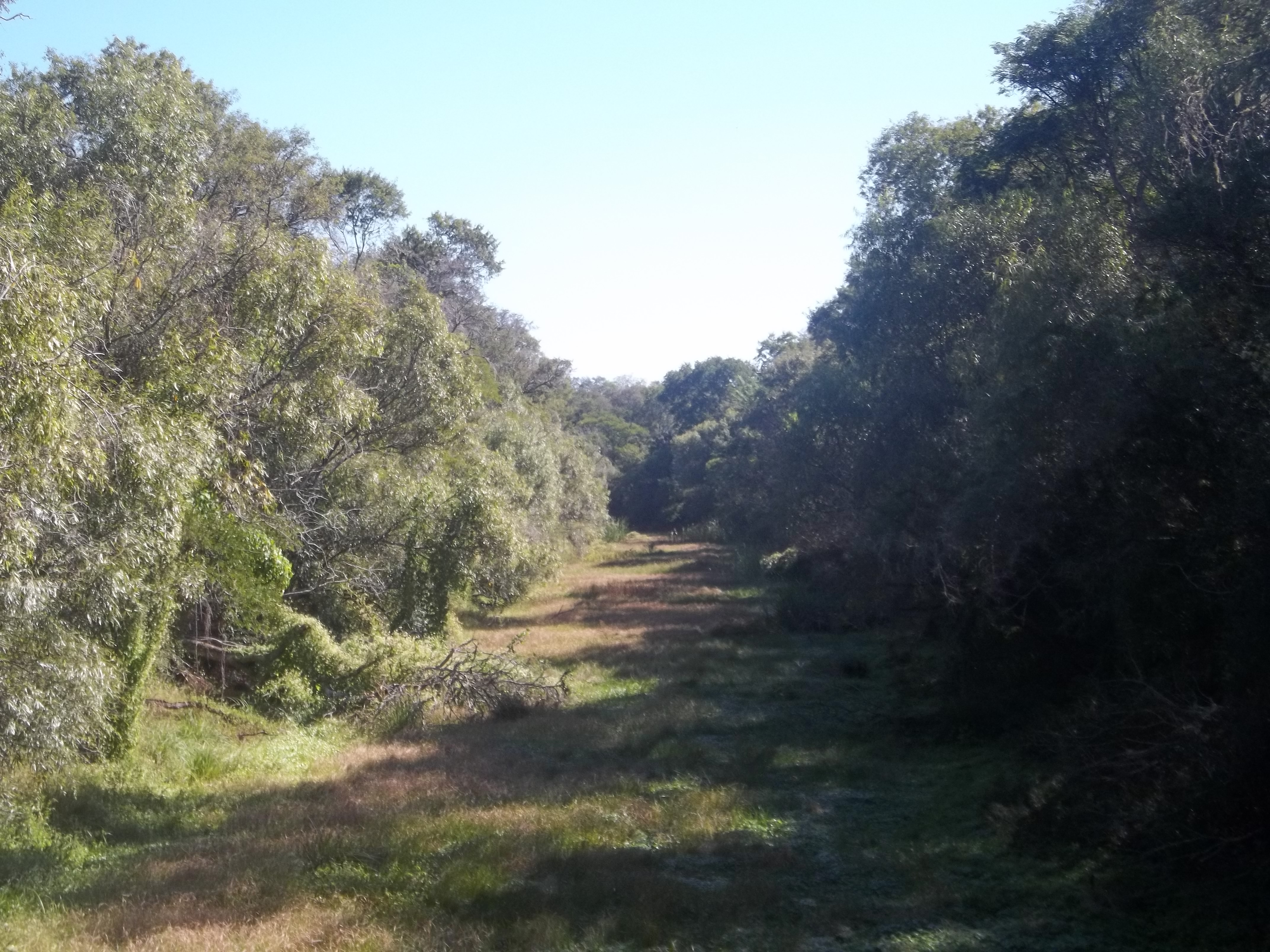
View of the Black River

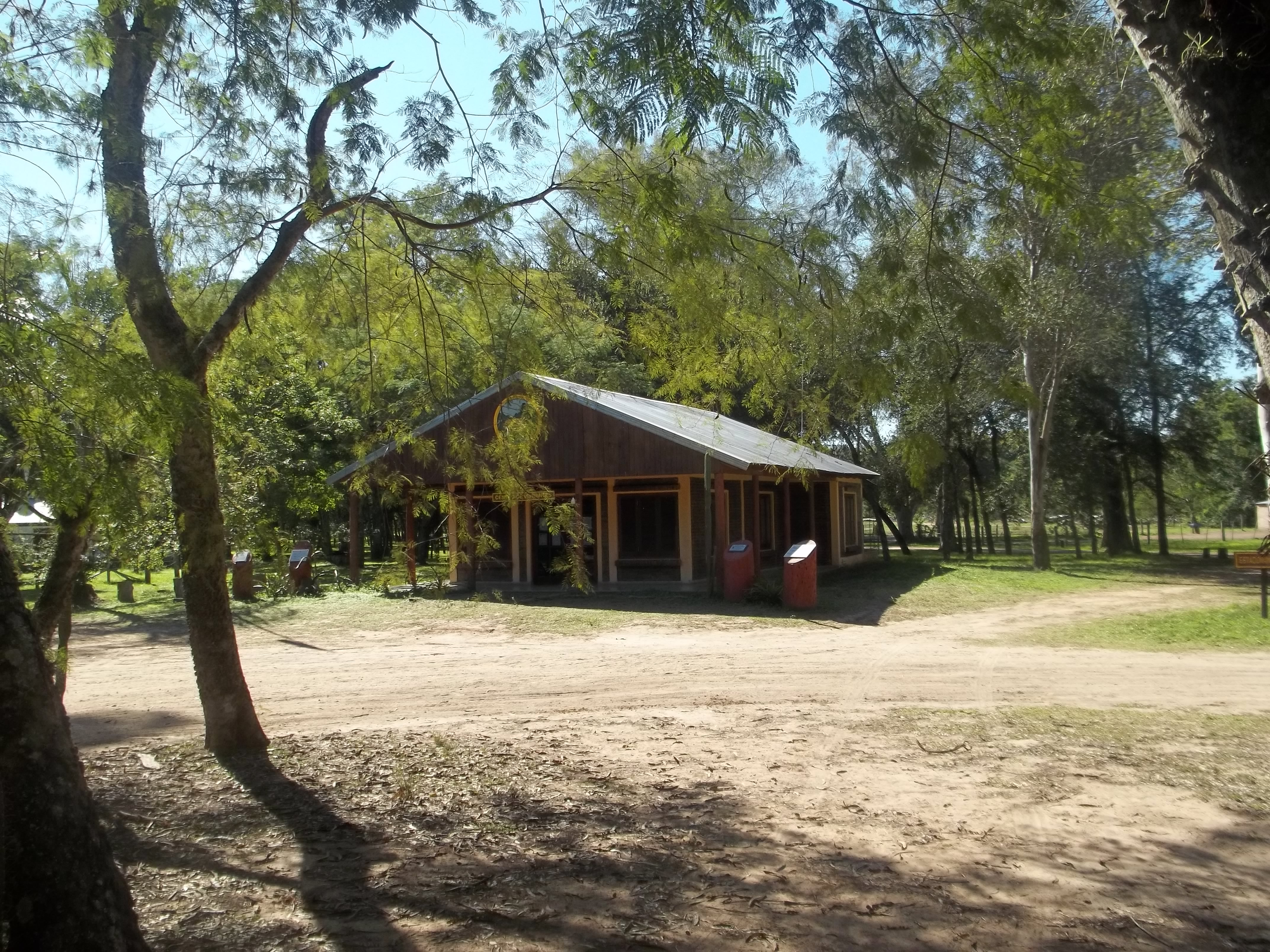
National Park visitor center in the camping area.

== See also ==
- Campo del Cielo
