= Uruguayan savanna =

Terrestrial ecoregion in South America

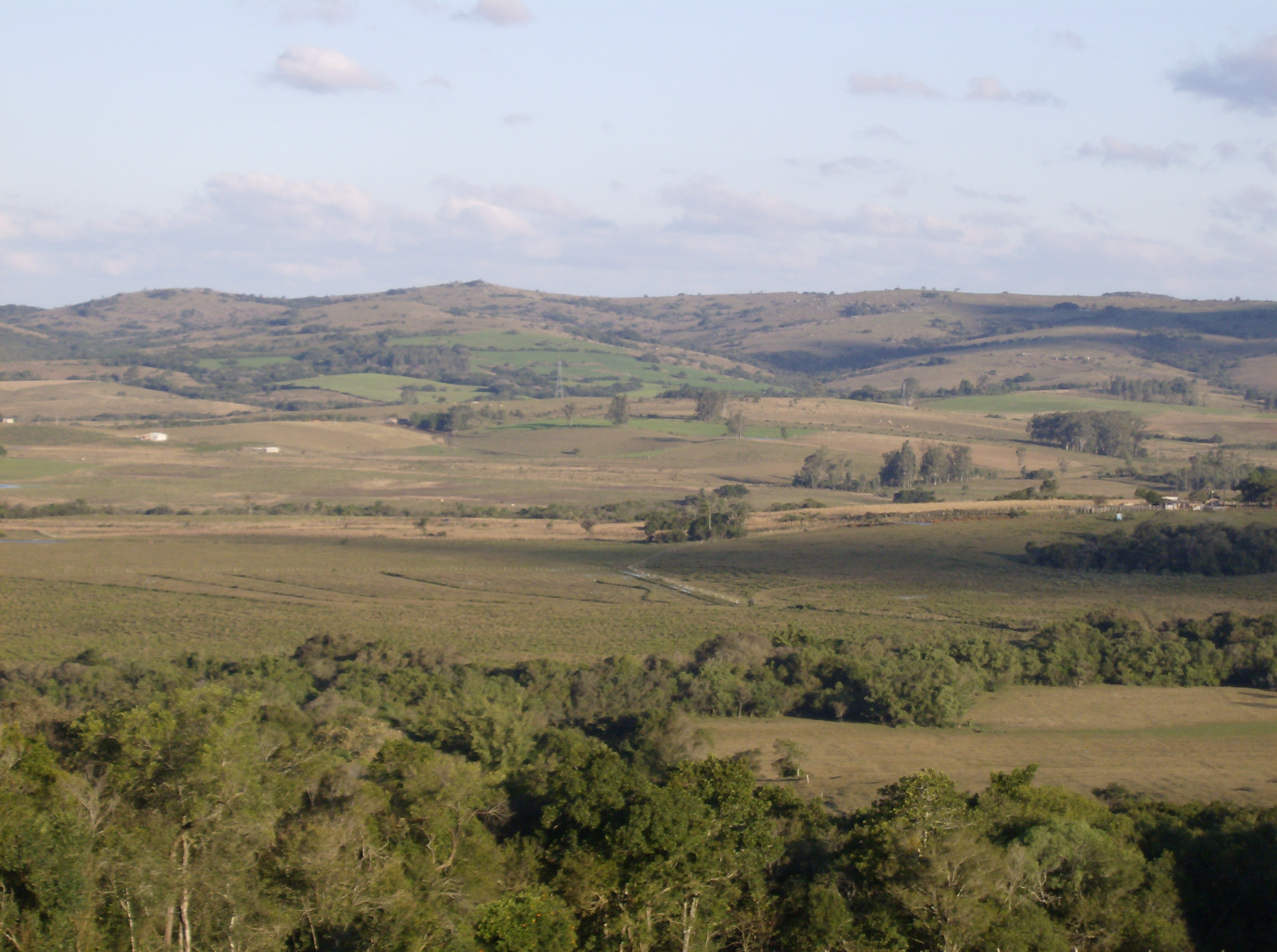
- Coxilhas (hills covered by grasslands) in Morro Redondo, Rio Grande do Sul state, Brazil.

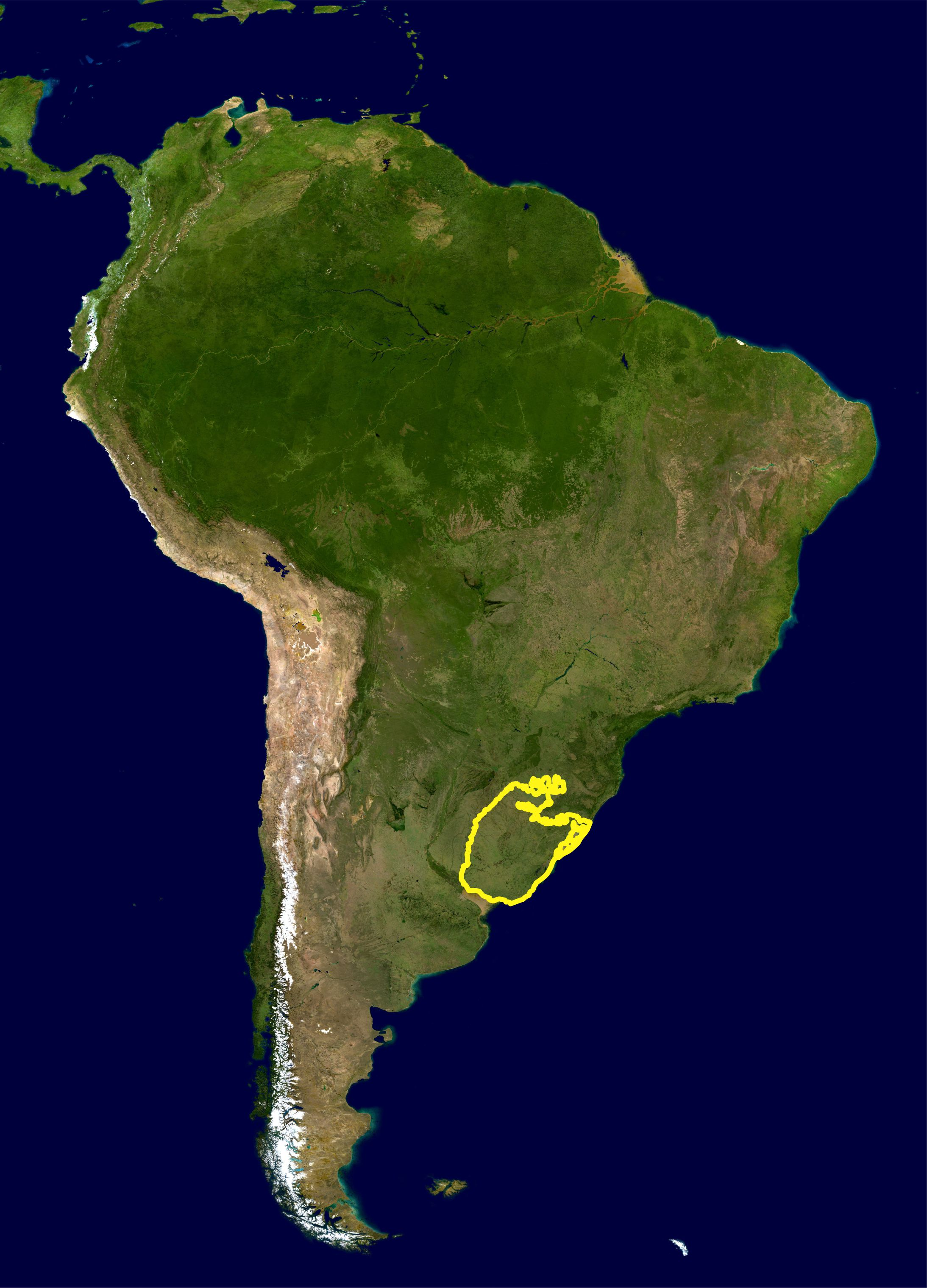
- Ecoregion territory (yellow boundaries)

Ecology
- Realm: Neotropical
- Biome: tropical and subtropical grasslands, savannas, and shrublands
- Borders: List: Alto Paraná Atlantic forests; Araucaria moist forests; Argentine Espinal; Humid Pampas; Southern Cone Mesopotamian savanna

Geography
- Area: 353,573 km^{2} (136,515 sq mi)
- Countries: Uruguay; Brazil; Argentina

Conservation
- Conservation status: Critical/endangered
- Protected: 3.43%

The Uruguayan savanna, also known as the Brazilian-Uruguayan savanna, is a subtropical grassland and savanna ecoregion which includes all of Uruguay and southernmost Brazil, along with portions of Argentina along the Uruguay River. In Brazil, this ecoregion is known as Pampas.

== Geography ==
The Uruguayan savanna covers an area of 353,573 km^{2}, covering the entirety of Uruguay and much of Brazil's Rio Grande do Sul state. It is bounded on the east by the South Atlantic Ocean and on the south by the Río de la Plata estuary. The Uruguay River forms the western boundary. To the north it transitions to the Alto Paraná Atlantic forests and Araucaria moist forests of southern Brazil.

The topography is generally low, extending from sea level up to 500 meters elevation. There are coastal lagoons along the Atlantic shore including Lagoa dos Patos in Brazil, which rise to rolling hills in the eastern part of the ecoregion. The western portion of the ecoregion is drained by tributaries of the Uruguay River, including the Ibicuí, Negro, Tacuarembó, Yí, and Queguay.

Cities in the ecoregion include Montevideo, Uruguay's capital and largest city, and Porto Alegre in Brazil.

== Climate ==
Average annual rainfall ranges from 1000 mm in the south to 1300 mm in the north. Temperature averages 16 °C annually in the south and 19 °C in the north.

== Flora ==
The ecoregion consists mostly of medium-tall grasslands, with areas of palm savanna, gallery forests along rivers, and enclaves of submontane forest.

== Fauna ==
Grazing mammals include the Pampas Deer (Ozotoceros bezoarticus), the Gray Brocket or Guazuvirá Deer (Mazama gouazoubira), and the capybara (Hydrochoerus hydrochaeris), the world's largest living rodent.

The ecoregion is home to 80 species of birds. These include the greater rhea (Rhea americana), ochre-breasted pipit (Anthus nattereri), yellow cardinal (Gubernatrix cristata), saffron-cowled blackbird (Xanthopsar flavus) and pampas meadowlark (Sturnella militaris).

== Protected areas ==
3.43% of the ecoregion is in protected areas. These include El Palmar National Park in Argentina, and San Miguel National Park, Esteros de Farrapos e Islas del Rio Uruguay National Park, Cabo Polonio National Park, Potrero de San Lorenzo National Reserve, and Quebrada de los Cuervos y Sierras del Yerbal Protected Landscape in Uruguay.

https://www.gub.uy/ministerio-ambiente/nuestras-areas-protegidas
