= Humid Chaco =

Terrestrial ecoregion in South America

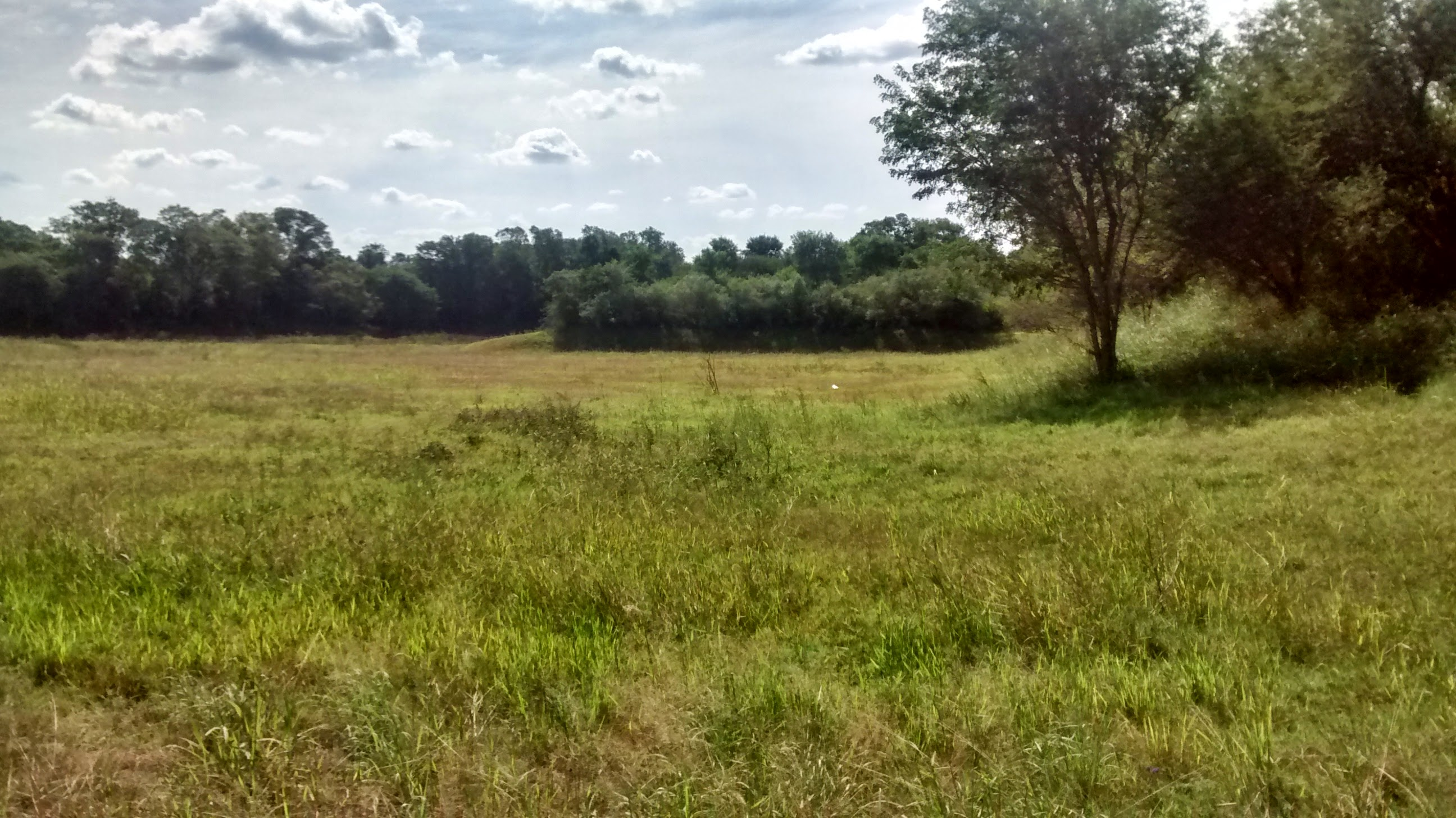
- Near Resistencia, Chaco, Northeastern Argentina

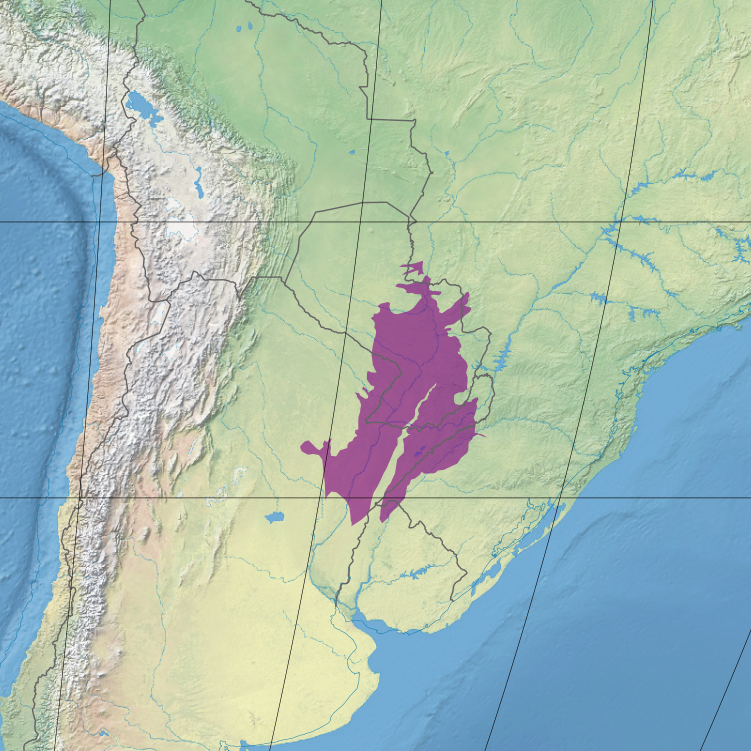

Ecology
- Realm: Neotropical
- Biome: tropical and subtropical grasslands, savannas, and shrublands
- Borders: List: Argentine Espinal; Alto Paraná Atlantic forests; Cerrado; Dry Chaco; Pantanal; Paraná flooded savanna; Southern Cone Mesopotamian savanna

Geography
- Area: 291,596 km^{2} (112,586 mi^{2})
- Countries: Paraguay; Argentina, Brazil; Uruguay

Conservation
- Protected: 35,949 km² (12%)

The Humid Chaco (Spanish: Chaco Húmedo or Chaco Oriental) is a tropical grasslands, savannas, and shrublands ecoregion in South America. It lies in the basin of the Paraná River, covering portions of central Paraguay and northern Argentina, and with a small portion of southwestern Brazil and northwestern Uruguay. The natural vegetation is a mosaic of grasslands, palm savanna, and forest.

== Geography ==
The Humid Chaco lies in the lowlands of the Paraná river and its tributaries, including the Paraguay River. It is bounded on the west by the Dry Chaco, a semi-arid region of dry forests and savannas. The Alto Paraná Atlantic forests lie to the east, and the Cerrado grasslands to the northeast. It borders on some large flooded grasslands and savannas, including the Paraná flooded savanna along the lower Paraná and Paraguay rivers, the Pantanal to the north, and the Southern Cone Mesopotamian savanna to the southeast between the Paraná and Uruguay rivers.

The topography is generally flat or gently rising, and the soils are mostly fine alluvium deposited by the area's rivers.

Asunción, Paraguay's capital, lies in the ecoregion.

== Climate ==
The climate is tropical, becoming subtropical towards the south. Average annual rainfall generally decreases towards the west, and ranges from 1,300 mm in the wetter eastern portions to 750 mm in the west near the transition to the Dry Chaco. Rainfall is highest in the summer months (January to April) and lowest in the winter months (June to August).

== Flora ==
The flora is a mosaic of grassland, savanna, forests, and bogs. Grasslands and savannas are generally found on higher ground, and forests along streams and in river floodplains. Bogs form seasonally or year-round over impermeable soil layers.

Grasslands are characterized by tall, coarse grass. Palm savannas are common, including the palm Copernicia alba.

The most common trees in the forests are quebracho colorado (Schinopsis balansae) and quebracho blanco (Aspidosperma quebracho-blanco), together with guayacán (Caesalpinia paraguariensis), espina corona (Gleditsia amorphoides), urunday (Myracrodruon balansae), viraró (Ruprechtia laxiflora), palo piedra (Diplokeleba floribunda), guayaibí (Patagonula americana), zapallo caspini (Pisonia zapallo), lapacho negro (Tabebuia ipe), palo borracho del flor rosada (Chorisia speciosa), and itin (Prosopis kuntzei).

== Fauna ==
Native mammals include puma (Puma concolor), jaguar (Panthera onca), maned wolf (Chrysocyon brachyurus), red brocket (Mazama americana), gray brocket (Mazama gouazoubira), marsh deer (Blastocerus dichotomus), pampas deer (Ozotoceros bezoarticus), White-lipped peccary (Tayassu pecari), collared peccary (Tayassu tajacu), giant anteater (Mymercophaga tridactyla), capybara (Hydrochaerys hydrochaeris), black howler monkey (Alouatta caraya), and Azara’s night monkey (Aotus azarae).

Birds species include the greater rhea or ñandú (Rhea americana), undulated tinamou (Crypturellus undulatus), savanna hawk (Buteogallus meridionalis), and pale-crested woodpecker (Celeus lugubris).

== Protected areas ==
A 2017 assessment found that 35,949 km², or 12% of the ecoregion, lies in protected areas.

Protected areas include Chaco National Park, Río Pilcomayo National Park, and Mburucuyá National Park in Argentina, and Ypoá National Park in Paraguay. The Iberá Wetlands, located in the southeast of the ecoregion adjacent to the Southern Cone Mesopotamian savanna, are protected by Argentina's Iberá Provincial Reserve and Iberá National Park.
