= Alto Paraná Atlantic forests =

Ecoregion in South America

Coordinates: 23.12°S 55.35°W

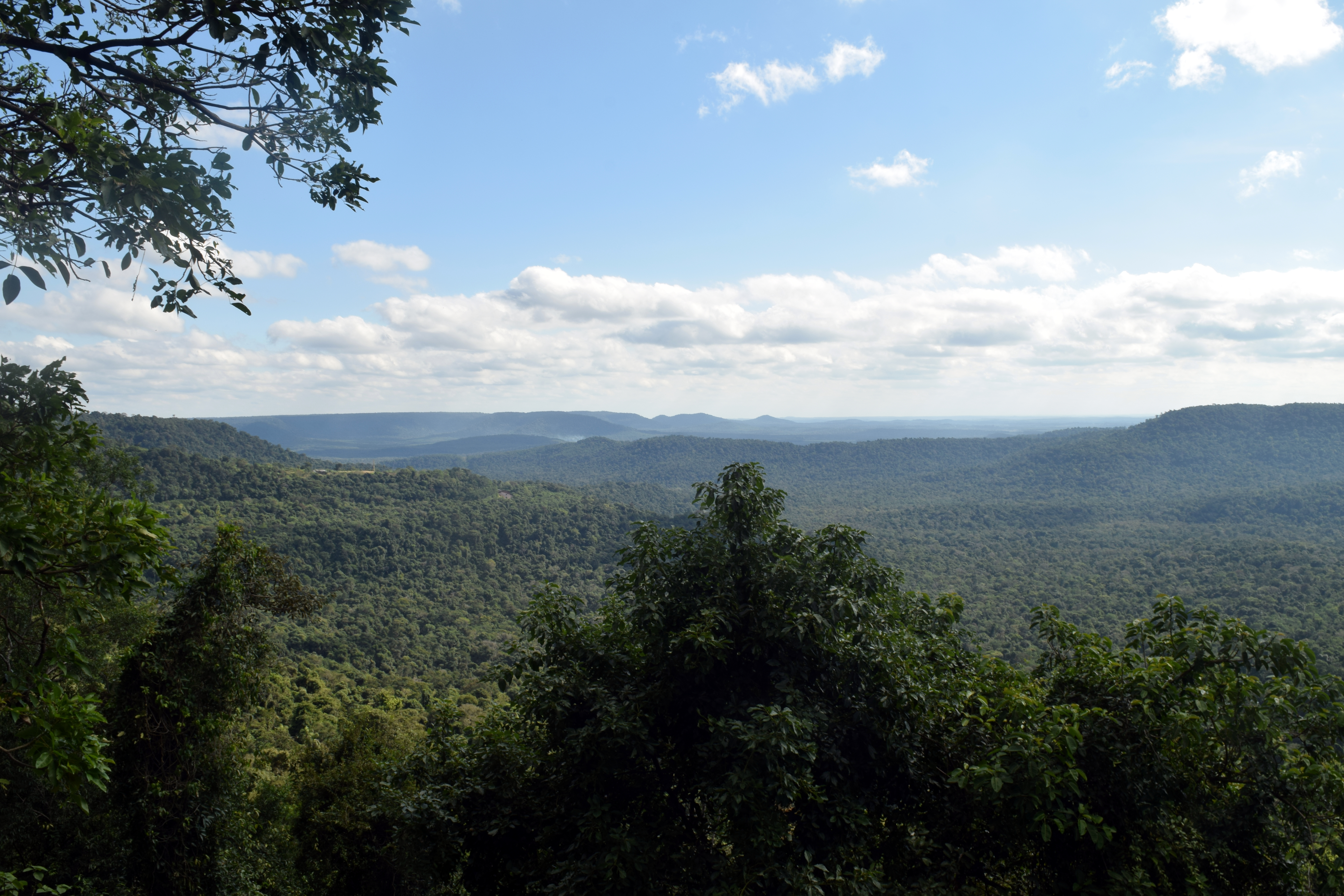
- View of the Salto Encantado Provincial Park from Provincial Route 7 in Argentina

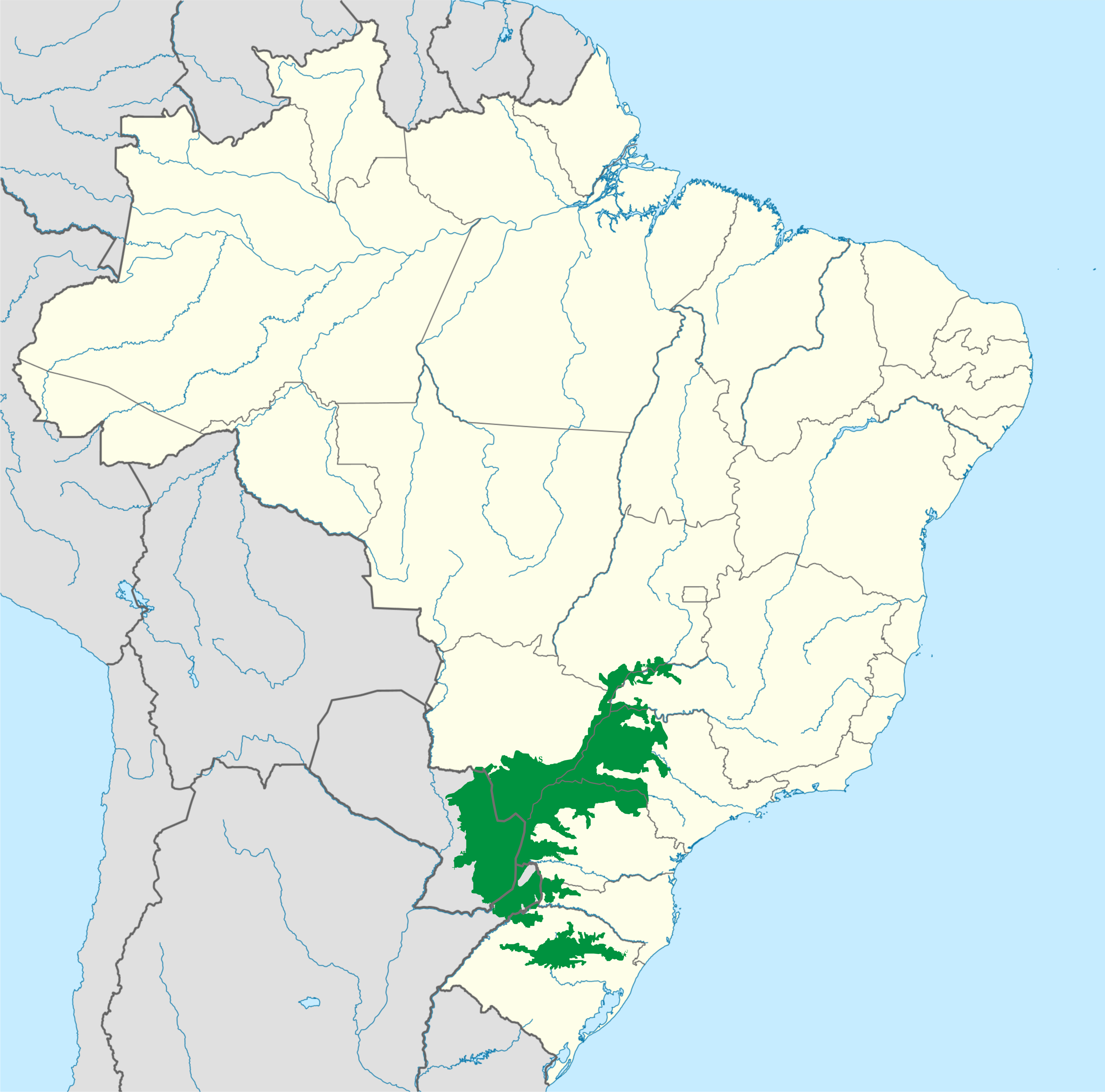
- Map of the Alto Paraná Atlantic forests

Ecology
- Realm: Neotropical
- Biome: Tropical and subtropical moist broadleaf forests
- Borders: List: Araucaria moist forests; Bahia interior forests; Campos Rupestres montane savanna; Cerrado; Humid Chaco; Serra do Mar coastal forests; Southern Cone Mesopotamian savanna; Uruguayan savanna
- Bird species: 586
- Mammal species: 213

Geography
- Area: 471,204 km^{2} (181,933 sq mi)
- Countries: Brazil; Argentina; Paraguay
- States: São Paulo; Mato Grosso do Sul; Paraná; Santa Catarina; Minas Gerais; Goiás; Rio Grande do Sul; Misiones Province

Conservation
- Habitat loss: 94.0%
- Protected: 5.95%

The Alto Paraná Atlantic forests, also known as the Paraná-Paraíba interior forests, is an ecoregion of the tropical moist forests biome, and the South American Atlantic Forest biome. It is located in southern Brazil, northeastern Argentina, and eastern Paraguay.

== Geography ==
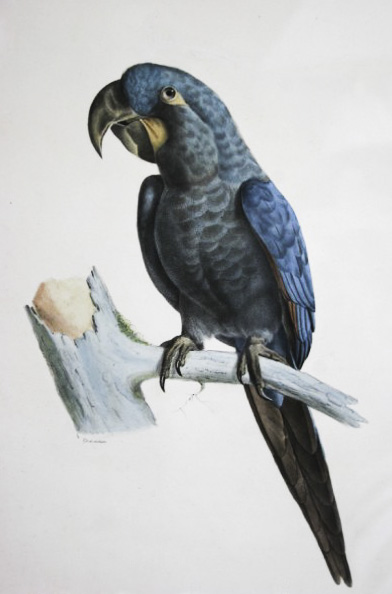
Glaucous macaw, an extinct endemic species formerly of this ecoregion.

The Alto Paraná Atlantic forests are an interior extension of the coastal forests, extending across the southern portion of the Brazilian Highlands. The ecoregion extends from the mouth of the Paraíba do Sul River eastward along the Paraíba valley lying behind the coastal Serra do Mar, and further eastward and northward along the basin of the Paraná River and its tributaries, forming a complex mosaic with the surrounding ecoregions.

States, provinces, and departments

The ecoregion covers portions of the Brazilian states of Minas Gerais, São Paulo, Goiás, Mato Grosso do Sul, Paraná, Santa Catarina, and Rio Grande do Sul, the Argentine province of Misiones, and the Paraguayan departments of Alto Paraná, Amambay, Caaguazú, Caazapá, Canindeyú, Concepción, Guairá, and Itapúa.

Adjacent ecoregions

The Cerrado lie to the north and east (in São Paulo), entwining with the Paraná-Paraíba forests in a complex mosaic. The Serra do Mar coastal forests lie to the south, on the Atlantic side of the Serra do Mar range. The Alto Paraná Atlantic forests wrap around the north, east, and south of the Araucaria moist forests, which cover a higher-elevation portion of the plateau in Paraná, Santa Catarina, and northern Rio Grande do Sul states. The Uruguayan savanna lies to the south, and to the west lie the Southern Cone Mesopotamian savanna and the Humid Chaco in Argentina and Paraguay, respectively.

== Climate ==
The climate of the ecoregion is subtropical, with 1,200 to 1,600 millimetres (47 to 63 in) of rainfall per year. The winter dry season extends from April to September.

== Flora ==
The main vegetation type is semi-deciduous forests, akin to the other interior forest ecoregions of the Atlantic forests. Approximately 40% of the trees lose their leaves during the winter dry season.

== Protected areas ==
5.95% of the ecoregion is in protected areas. Protected areas include Iguazú, Caazapa, Cerro Cora, Itatiaia, Ybycui, Ñacunday, San Rafael, and Saltos del Guairá national parks, and Caetetus Ecological Station, Paulo de Faria Ecological Station, Ybera Scientific Reserve, Alto Iguazu Wilderness Nature Reserve, Urugua-í Wildlife Reserve, and Marília Ecological Station.

== See also ==
- List of plants of Atlantic Forest vegetation of Brazil
- Ecoregions of the Atlantic Forest biome
