= Southern Cone Mesopotamian savanna =

Ecoregion in Argentina and Paraguay

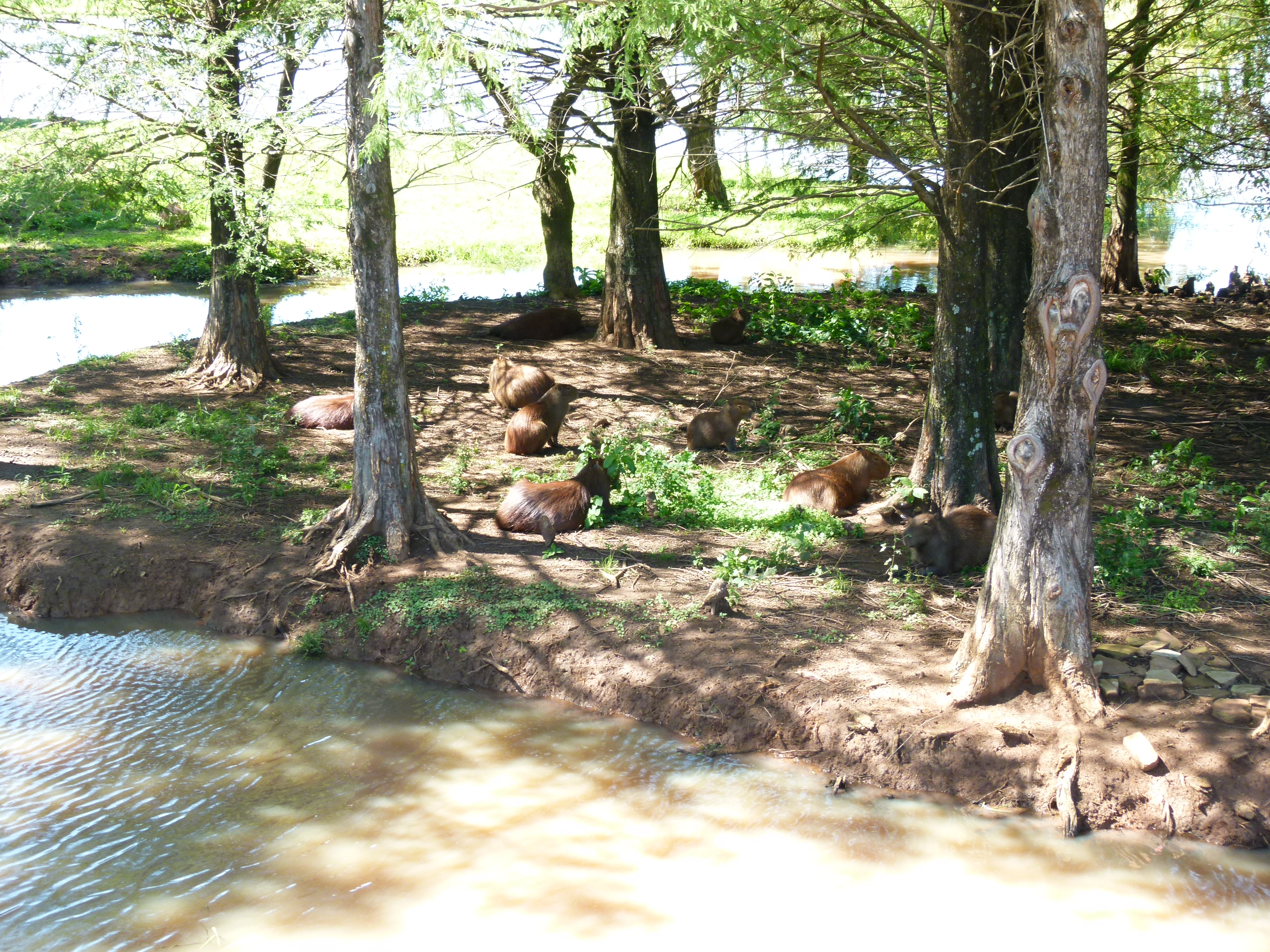
- Capybara near Gobernador Virasoro, Corrientes Province, Argentina

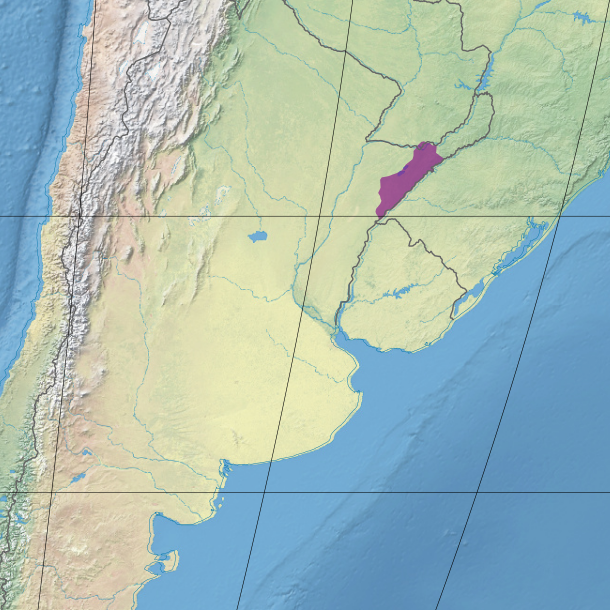
- Ecoregion territory (in purple)

Ecology
- Realm: Neotropical
- Biome: flooded grasslands and savannas
- Borders: Alto Paraná Atlantic forests; Argentine Espinal; Humid Chaco, Uruguayan savanna

Geography
- Area: 26,866 km^{2} (10,373 sq mi)
- Countries: Argentina and Paraguay
- States: Corrientes; Misiones

Conservation
- Protected: 173 km² (1%)

The Southern Cone Mesopotamian savanna, also known as the Argentine Mesopotamian grasslands, is a flooded grassland ecoregion of Argentina and southern Paraguay.

== Setting ==
The ecoregion covers an area of 77,600 square kilometres (30,000 sq mi), lying west of the Uruguay River in Argentina's Corrientes Province, extending north into the adjacent portion of Misiones Province.

== Flora ==
The ecoregion is covered by a mosaic of seasonally wet habitats, including grasslands, marshes, woodland, and gallery forests.

== Fauna ==
The Mesopotamian savanna is an endemic bird area, with three endemic species, two of which are threatened.
