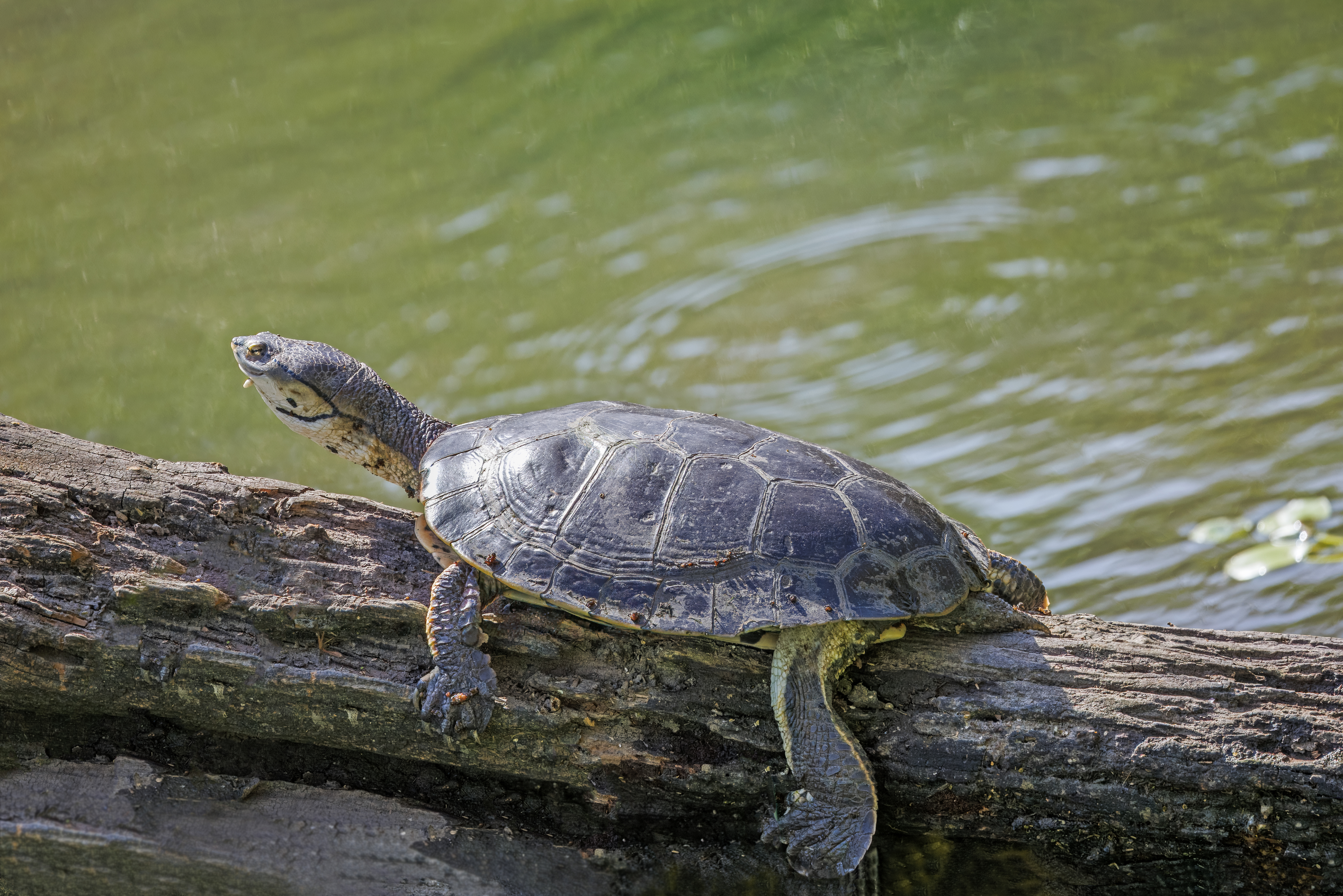
- In Buenos Aires, Argentina

Scientific classification
- Kingdom: Animalia
- Phylum: Chordata
- Class: Reptilia
- Order: Testudines
- Suborder: Pleurodira
- Family: Chelidae
- Genus: Phrynops
- Species: P. hilarii

Binomial name
- Phrynops hilarii (A.M.C. Duméril & Bibron, 1835)

Synonyms
- List: Platemys hilarii A.M.C. Duméril & Bibron, 1835; Hydraspis hilairii [sic] Gray, 1844 (ex errore); Hydraspis hilarii — Gray, 1856; Spatulemys lasalae Gray, 1872; Hydraspis hilari [sic] Koslowsky, 1898 (ex errore); Hydraspis geoffroyanus hilarii — Siebenrock, 1905; Phrynops hilarii — Stejneger, 1909; Phrynops geoffroana hilarii — L. Müller, 1939; Phrynops geoffroanus hilarii — Wermuth & Mertens, 1961; Hydraspis hilairi [sic] Pritchard, 1967 (ex errore); Phrynops hilari — Goode, 1967

= Phrynops hilarii =

Species of turtle

Phrynops hilarii, also commonly known as Hilaire’s side-necked turtle and Hilaire's toadhead turtle, is a species of freshwater turtle in the family Chelidae. The species is endemic to South America.

== Etymology ==
The specific name, hilarii, is in honor of French zoologist Isidore Geoffroy Saint-Hilaire.

== Geographic range ==
Phrynops hilarii is found in southern Brazil (Santa Catarina and Rio Grande do Sul), southward and westward into Uruguay and Argentina, and possibly also in Paraguay and Bolivia.

== Habitat ==
Phrynops hilarii inhabits streams, lakes, and swamps with abundant aquatic vegetation and soft bottoms.

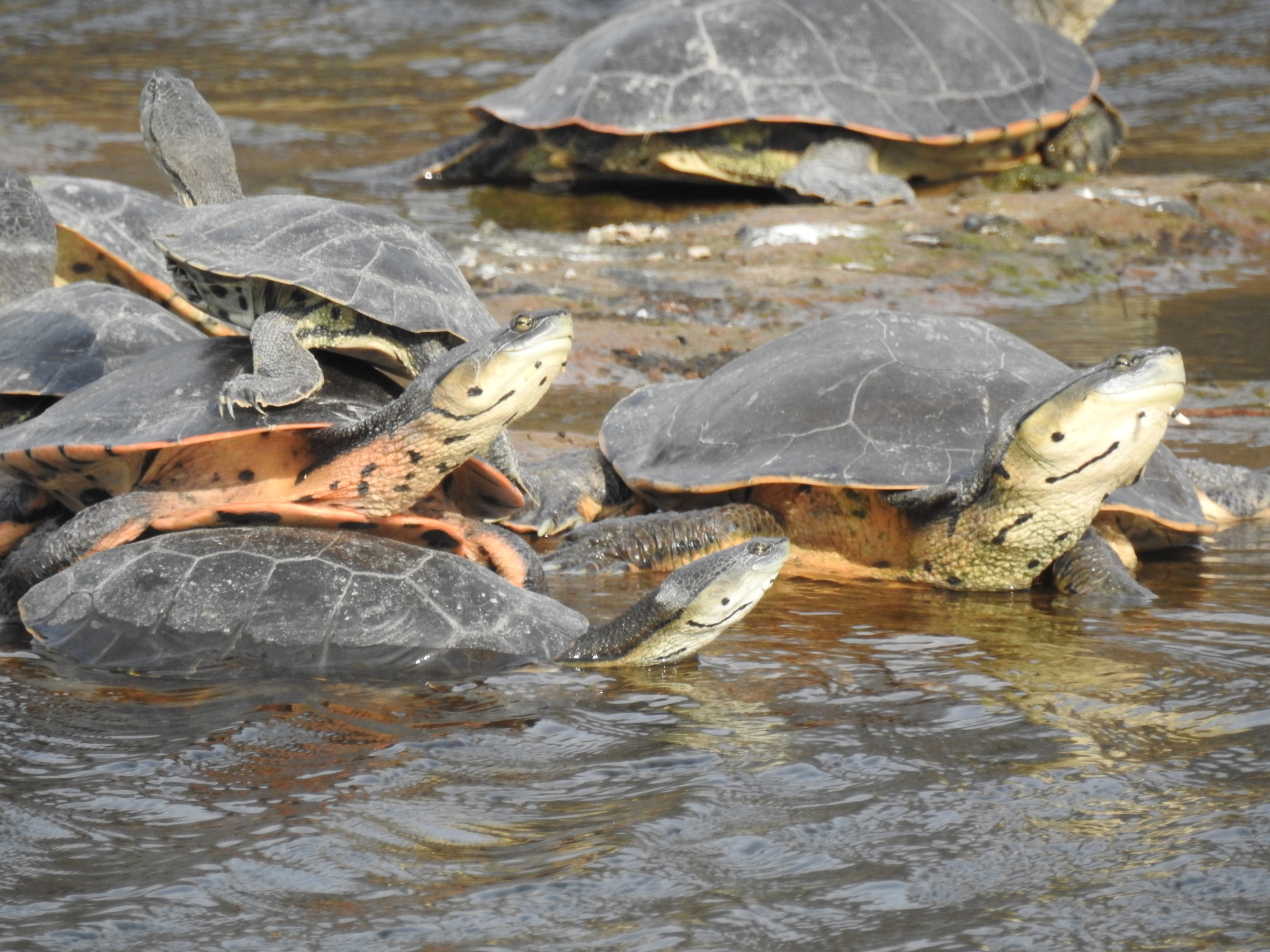
In Argentina

== Description ==
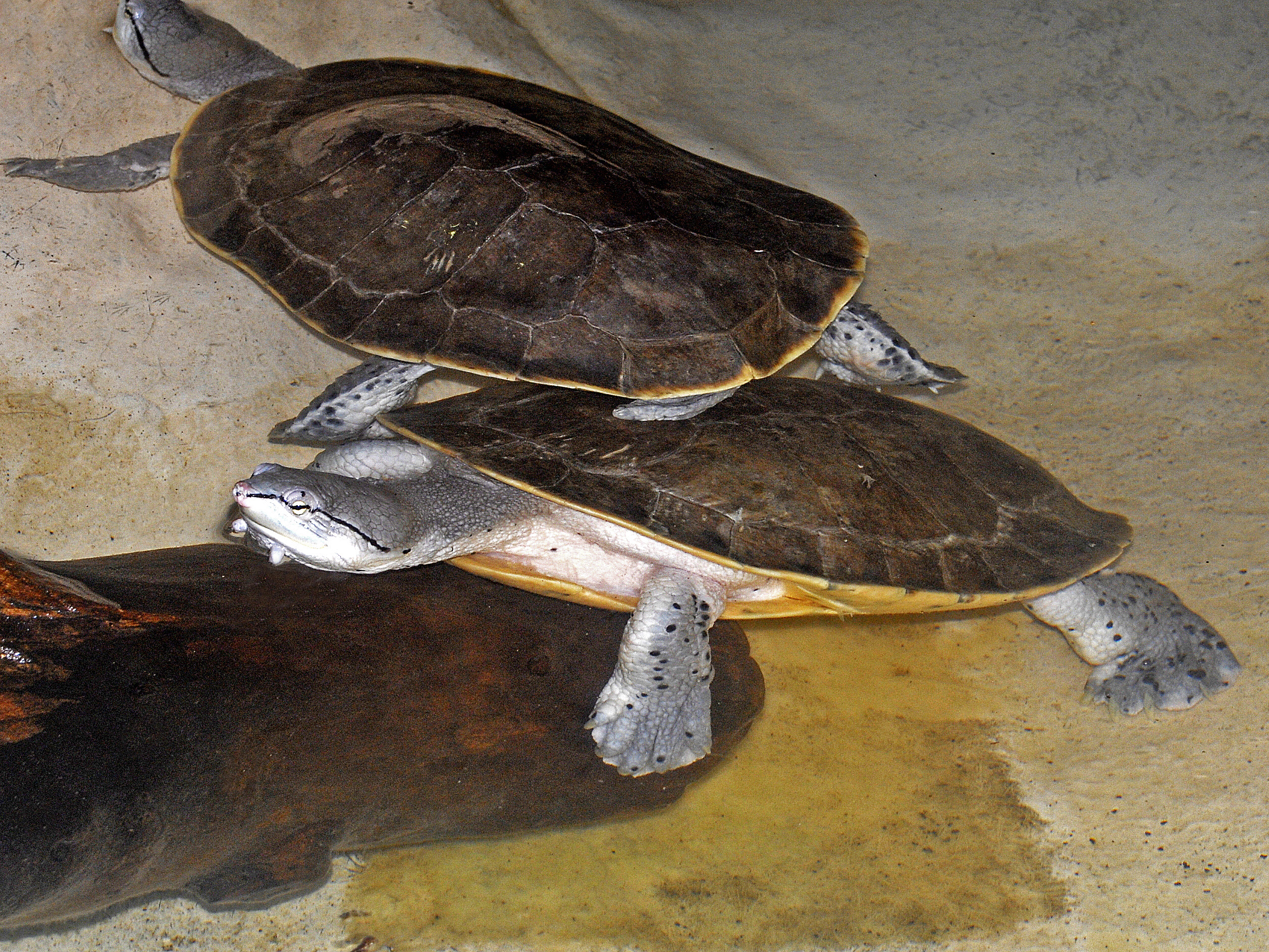
Phrynops hilarii

Phrynops hilarii has an oval, flattened carapace, with a maximum straight-line length of approximately 40 cm (16 in), weighing approximately 5 kg (11 lb). The carapace is usually dark brown, olive, or gray, with a yellow border. The head is large and flat, gray to olive above, with a pointed snout and two bicolored chin barbels. There is a black band on each side of the head, which comes out of the muzzle and passes over the eyes, going up to the neck.

== Biology ==
Phrynops hilarii swimming in captivity.

An omnivorous species, P. hilarii mainly feeds on arthropods, with a preference for copepods, ostracods, and hemipterans. It feeds also on fishes, reptiles, birds, small mammals, and carrion. It is oviparous. This turtle can live for up to 37 years.

Females lay eggs twice a year, one clutch between February and May and the other between September and December. They lay from 9 to 14 eggs, with a maximum of 32 eggs and an incubation period of approximately 150 days.
