= Araucaria moist forests =

Ecoregion in Brazil and Argentina

Coordinates: 26.36°S 51.35°W

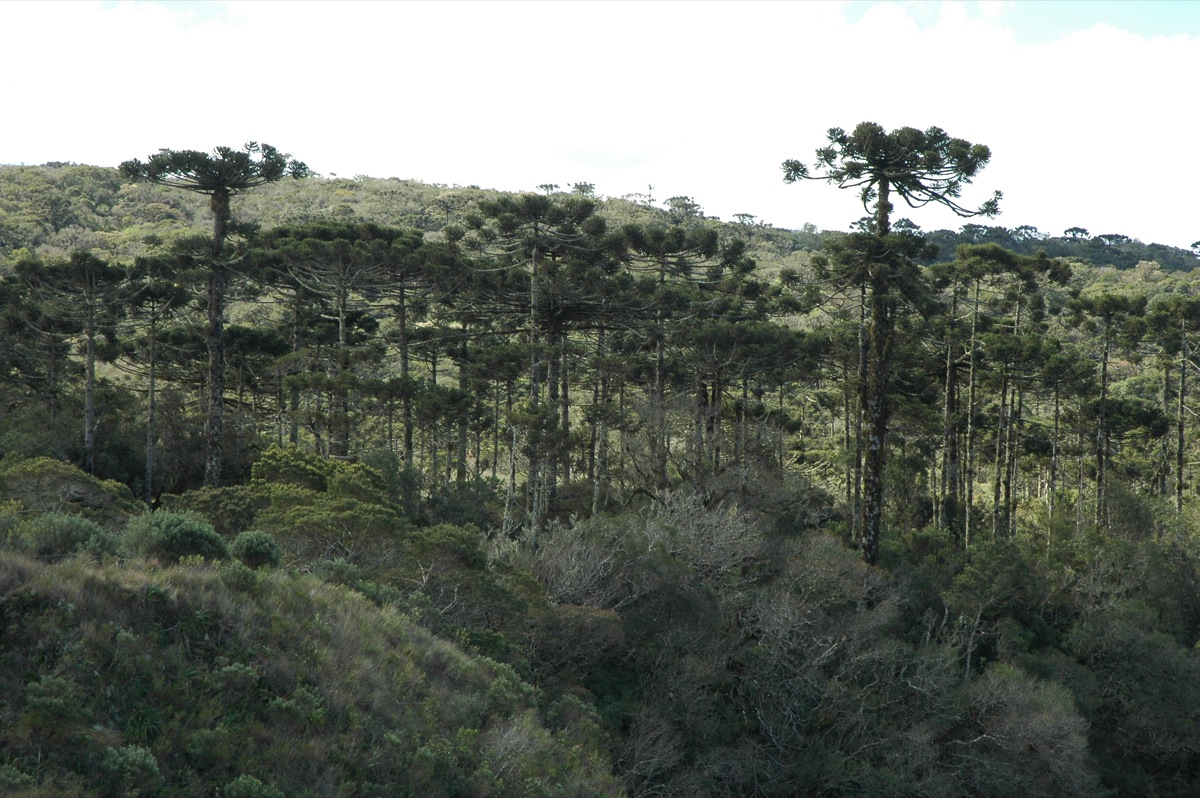
- Araucaria moist forest in Aparados da Serra National Park, Brazil.

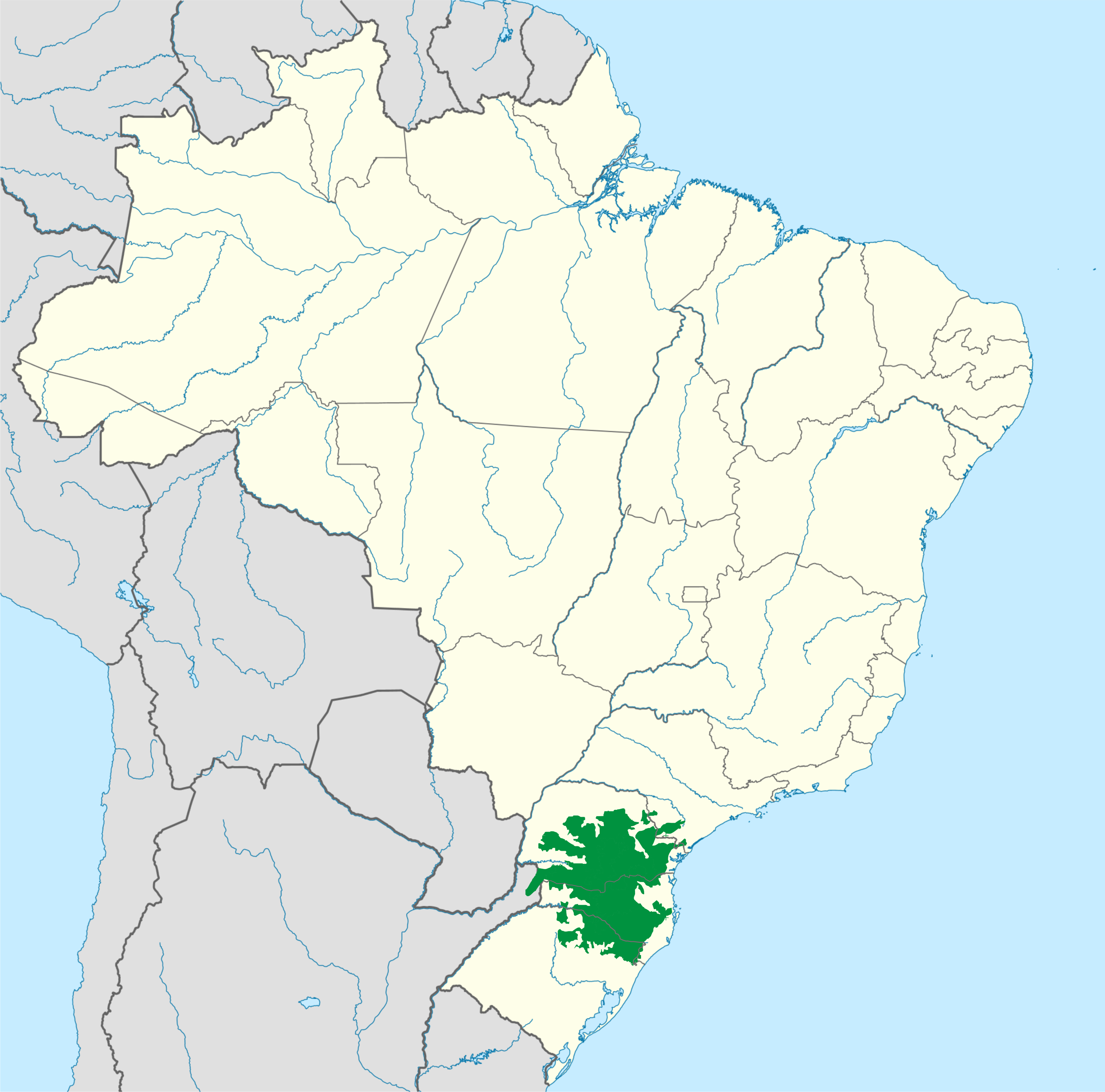
- Araucaria moist forests ecoregion as defined by WWF.

Ecology
- Realm: Neotropical
- Biome: Tropical and subtropical moist broadleaf forests
- Borders: Alto Paraná Atlantic forests; Cerrado; Serra do Mar coastal forests; Uruguayan savanna
- Bird species: 440
- Mammal species: 141

Geography
- Area: 216,100 km^{2} (83,400 mi^{2})
- Countries: Brazil; Argentina
- States: São Paulo; Paraná; Santa Catarina; Rio Grande do Sul; Misiones Province

Conservation
- Habitat loss: 87.0%
- Protected: 4.757%

The Araucaria moist forests, officially classified as mixed ombrophilous forest (Portuguese: "Floresta Ombrófila Mista") in Brazil, are a montane subtropical moist forest ecoregion. The forest ecosystem is located in southern and in few areas of southeastern Brazil and parts of northeastern Argentina. The ecoregion is a southern portion of the Atlantic Forest. The ecoregion also includes select areas of open field called "campos de cima da serra" or "coxilhas" (highland fields).

== Setting ==
The moist forests cover an area of 216,100 square kilometres (83,400 mi^{2}), encompassing a region of mountains and plateaus in the Brazilian states of São Paulo, Paraná, Santa Catarina, and Rio Grande do Sul, and extending into Misiones Province of Argentina.

The ecoregion lies above 500 metres (1,600 ft), rising to 1,600 metres (5,200 ft) elevation on the high slopes of the Serra Geral.

The ecoregion is bounded by the Alto Paraná Atlantic forests to the north, west, and south, the Cerrado savannas and shrublands to the northeast, The Serra do Mar coastal forests to the east, and the Uruguayan savanna to the southwest.

=== Climate ===
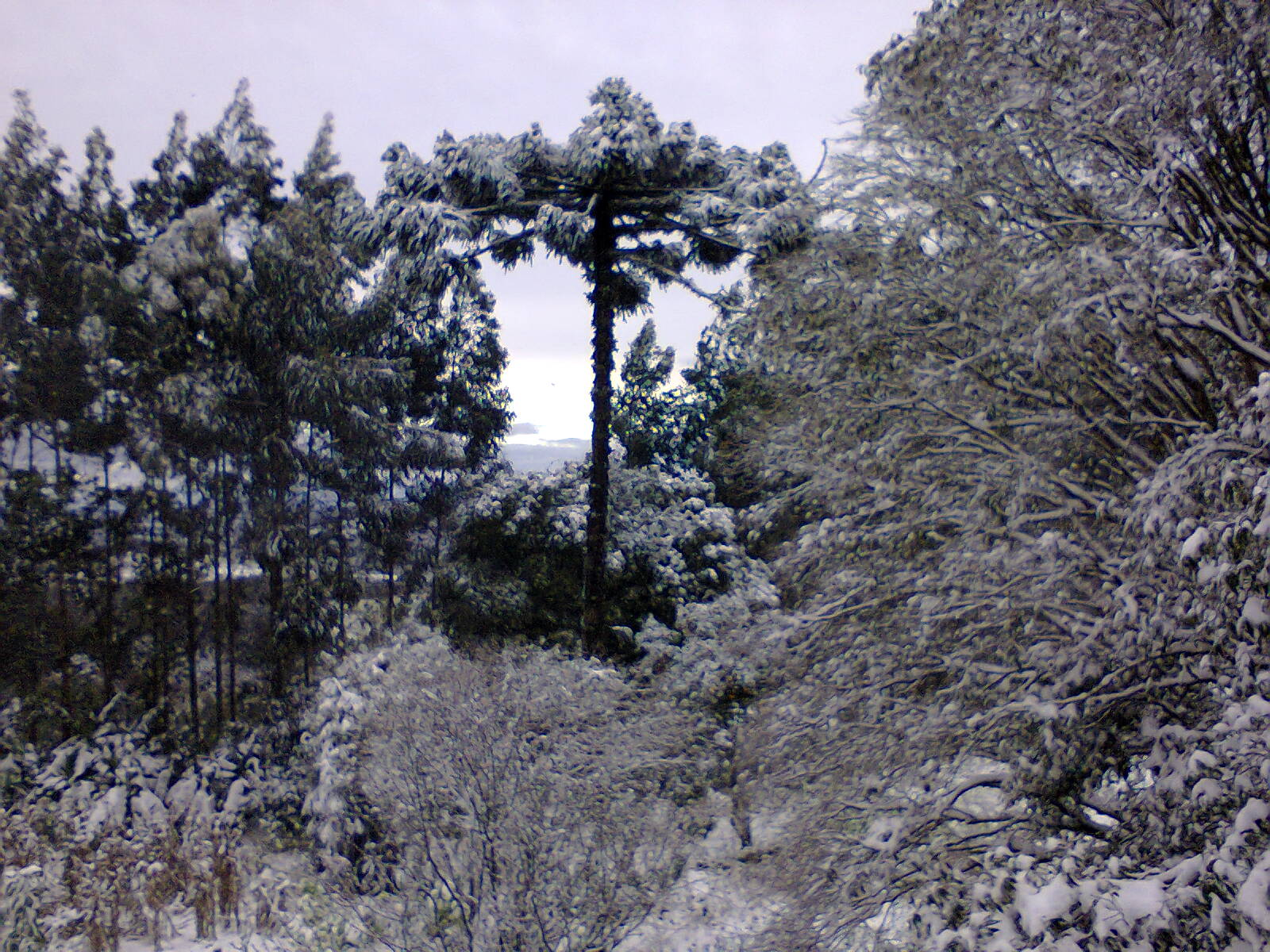
Snow on Araucaria trees in Itaiópolis, Brazil, winter 2013

The Araucaria moist forests have an oceanic temperate climate (Cfb), with frequent frosts during the winter months and considerable snowfalls (generally light) in the highest areas. Annual precipitation is high, ranging from 1,300 to 3,000 millimetres (51 to 118 in), without a dry season.

== Flora ==
The ecoregion mostly consists of evergreen subtropical moist forests, with a canopy made up of the broadleaved trees Ocotea pretiosa, O. catharinense, and O. porosa (Lauraceae), Campomanesia xanthocarpa (Myrtaceae), and Mimosa scabrella and Parapiptadenia rigida (both Leguminosae). The conifer Brazilian araucaria (Araucaria angustifolia) forms an emergent layer, growing up to 45 metres (148 ft) in height. The forests are significant from an evolutionary perspective, as a relict of mixed coniferous and broadleaved forests that were once much more widespread, and are home to many taxa characteristic of the Antarctic flora.

== Fauna ==
The ecoregion is home to several threatened species endemic to the Atlantic forests, including the brown howler monkey (Alouatta guariba) and the red-spectacled parrot (Amazona pretrei). The Araucaria moist forests is recognized as an important endemic bird area.

== Conservation and threats ==
The Araucaria moist forests are within the Atlantic Forest Biome (Mata Atlântica), which is recognized as a biodiversity hotspot by Conservation International, and as a Global 200 ecoregion by the World Wildlife Fund.

4.757% of the ecoregion is in protected areas. Protected areas include Aparados da Serra National Park, Araucárias National Park, Campos Gerais National Park, Guaricana National Park, Iguaçu National Park, São Joaquim National Park, Serra Geral National Park, and Serra do Itajaí National Park.
