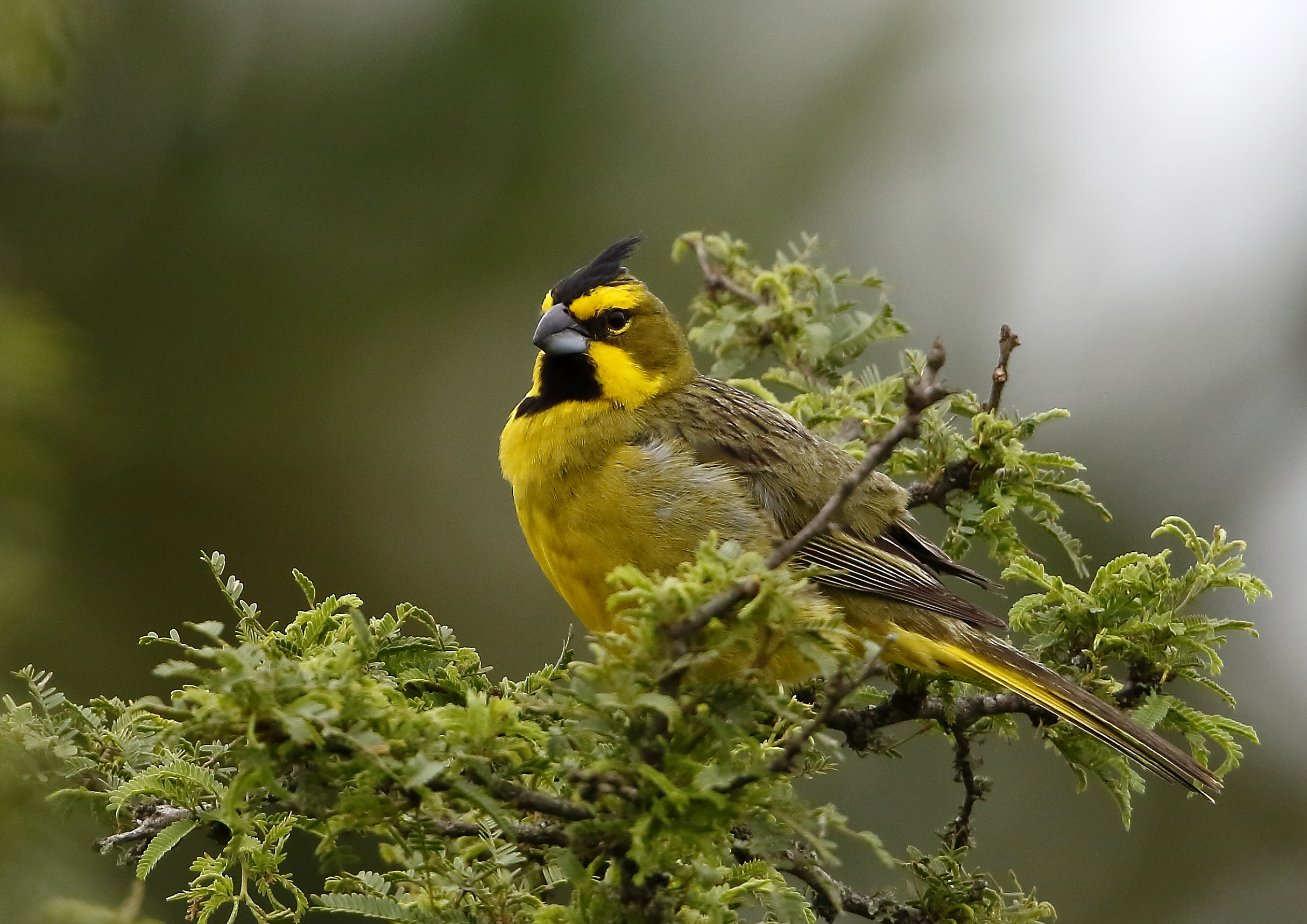

Conservation status
- Endangered (IUCN 3.1)
- CITES Appendix II

Scientific classification
- Kingdom: Animalia
- Phylum: Chordata
- Class: Aves
- Order: Passeriformes
- Family: Thraupidae
- Genus: Gubernatrix; Lesson, 1837
- Species: G. cristata

Binomial name
- Gubernatrix cristata (Vieillot, 1817)

= Yellow cardinal =

Species of bird

The yellow cardinal (Gubernatrix cristata) is a species of South American bird in the tanager family Thraupidae. It is the only member of its genus, Gubernatrix.

== Taxonomy ==
The yellow cardinal was formally described in 1817 by the French ornithologist Louis Pierre Vieillot under the binomial name Coccothraustes cristata. The specific epithet is from the Latin cristatus meaning "crested" or "plumed". The species was moved to its own genus Gubernatrix by the French naturalist René Lesson in 1837. The genus name is the Latin word for "governess".

Although traditionally included in the family Emberizidae, a study published in 2011 found that the species was more closely related to the tanager family Thraupidae. A comprehensive study of the tanagers published in 2014 found strong support for a sister relationship between the yellow cardinal and the diuca finch. The two species are known to hybridize. The yellow cardinal is monotypic and no subspecies are recognised.

== Distribution and habitat ==
It is found in Argentina, Brazil, Paraguay, and Uruguay. Its natural habitats are dry savanna, temperate shrubland, subtropical or tropical moist shrubland, and temperate grassland. It is threatened by habitat loss and from pet trade trappers for sale as exotic pets. Males are trapped at a higher rate than females, and the yellow cardinal is considered endangered due to the constant entrapment. Countering woody plant encroachment can contribute to habitat restoration.

There was a study conducted that looked at the vocalization of the yellow cardinal in its habitat. It was found that there was some variation with the diuca finch.

== Status ==
The current global population of Gubernatrix cristata is between 1000 and 2000. Studies have shown that there are some genetic differences between different populations. Another study has shown that the yellow cardinal presents plasticity in song production, with small differences in song among four different populations.
