= Flooded grasslands and savannas =

Terrestrial biome

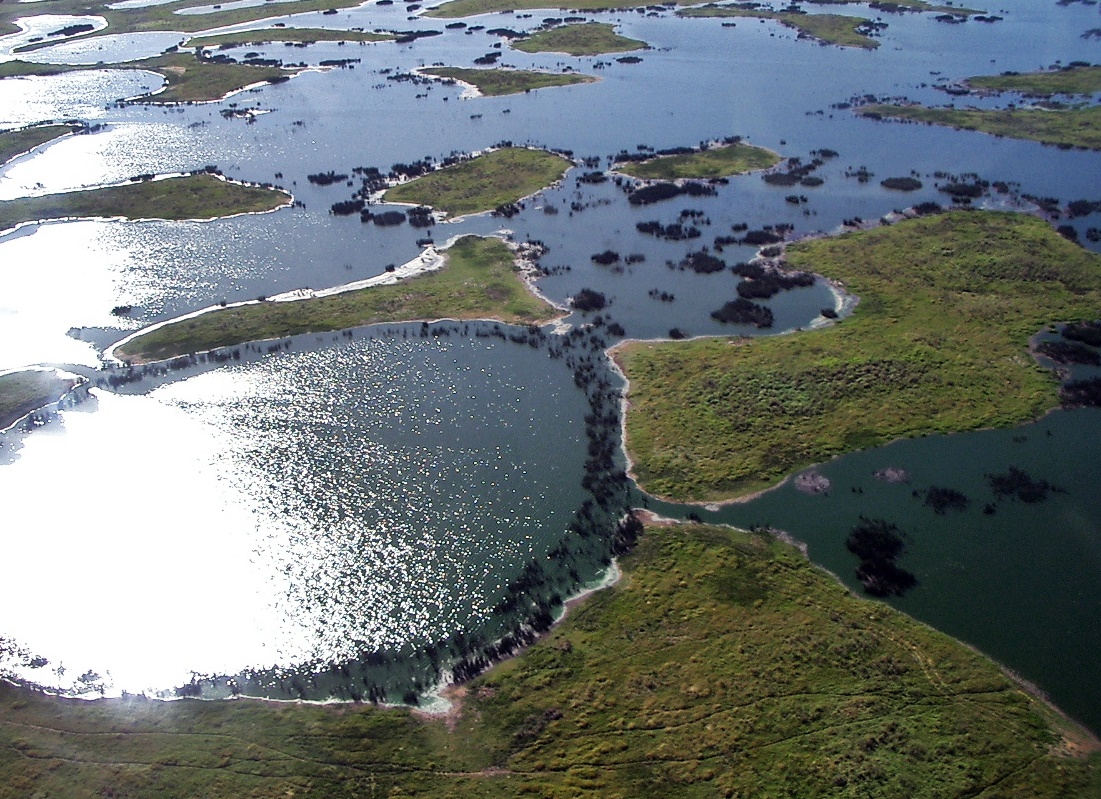
The Pantanal, in central South America

Extent of flooded grasslands and savannas

Flooded grasslands and savannas is a terrestrial biome of the World Wide Fund for Nature (WWF) biogeographical system, consisting of large expanses or complexes of flooded grasslands. These areas support numerous plants and animals adapted to the unique hydrologic regimes and soil conditions. Large congregations of migratory and resident waterbirds may be found in these regions. The relative importance of these habitat types for these birds as well as more migratory animals typically varies, as the availability of water and productivity annually and seasonally shifts among complexes of smaller and larger wetlands throughout a region.

This habitat type is found in Asia, Africa, North America and South America. Some globally outstanding flooded savannas and grasslands occur in the Everglades, Pantanal, Lake Chad flooded savanna, Zambezian flooded grasslands, and the Sudd. The Everglades, with an area of 7,800 sq mi (20,000 km^{2}), are the world's largest rain-fed flooded grassland on a limestone substrate, and feature some 11,000 species of seed-bearing plants, 25 varieties of orchids, 300 bird species, and 150 fish species. The Pantanal, with an area of 187,818 km^{2} (72,517 sq mi), is the largest flooded grassland on Earth, supporting over 260 species of fish, 700 birds, 90 mammals, 160 reptiles, 45 amphibians, 1,000 butterflies, and 1,600 species of plants. The flooded savannas and grasslands are generally the largest complexes in each region.

== See also ==
- Coniferous swamp
- Dambo
- Fen
- Flood-meadow
- Freshwater swamp forest
- Mangroves
- Marsh
- Marsh gas
- Muck (soil)
- Peat
- Peat swamp forest
- Salt marsh
- Shrub swamp
- Water-meadow
- Wet meadow
