= Tigerwood =

Tigerwood is a common name for lumber produced from several species of tropical trees:

- Lovoa trichilioides, a tree species found in Africa
- Gonçalo alves, several species found in Brazil:
  - Astronium fraxinifolium
  - Astronium graveolens
  - Astronium lecointei
- Erythrina standleyana and Erythrina rubrinervia, from northwest South America and Central America
- Microberlinia bisulcata, a tree in Cameroon

== See also ==
- Tiger Woods (born 1975), American professional golfer
