= Zebrawood =

Striped wood of various tree species from Central America or Central Africa

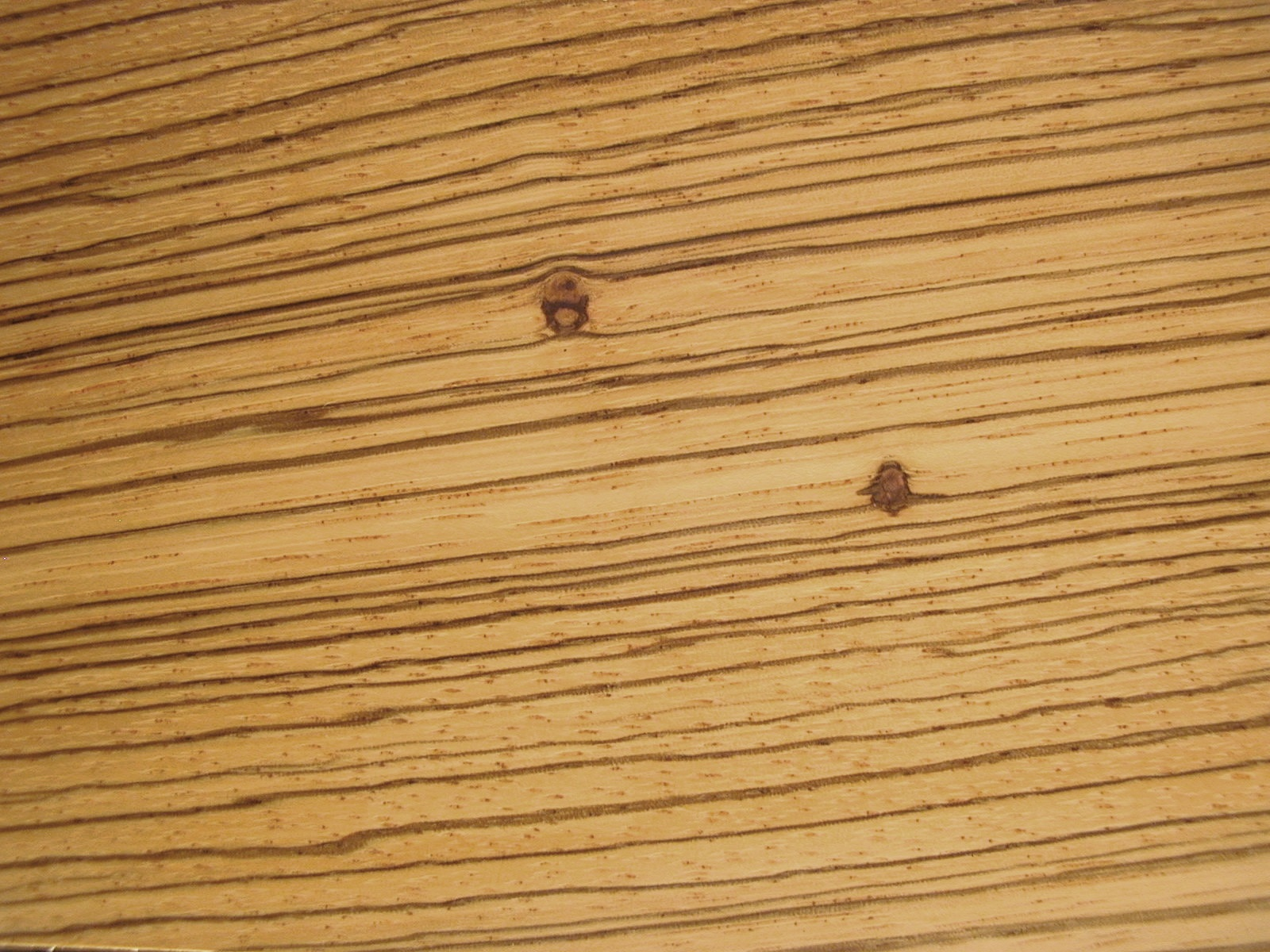
Zebrawood

The name zebrawood is used to describe several tree species and the wood derived from them. Zebrawood is characterized by a striped figure that is reminiscent of a zebra. The name originally applied to the wood of Astronium graveolens, a large tree native to Central America. In the 20th century, the most important source of zebrawood was Microberlinia brazzavillensis, also called zebrano, a tree native to Central Africa. Other sources include Brazilian Astronium fraxinifolium, African Brachystegia spiciformis, Pacific Guettarda speciosa, and Asian Pistacia integerrima.

== History ==
Zebrawood was first recorded in the British Customs returns for 1773, when 180 pieces of zebrawood were imported from the Mosquito Coast, a British colony (now the Republic of Honduras and Nicaragua). In his History of Jamaica (1774), Edward Long relates, "The species of zebra wood at present in esteem among the cabinet-makers is brought to Jamaica from the Mosquito shore; it is of a most lovely tint, and richly veined..." The Mosquito Coast thereafter exported zebrawood regularly until the Convention of London (1786) and the consequent expulsion of British settlers from this part of the Viceroyalty of New Spain.

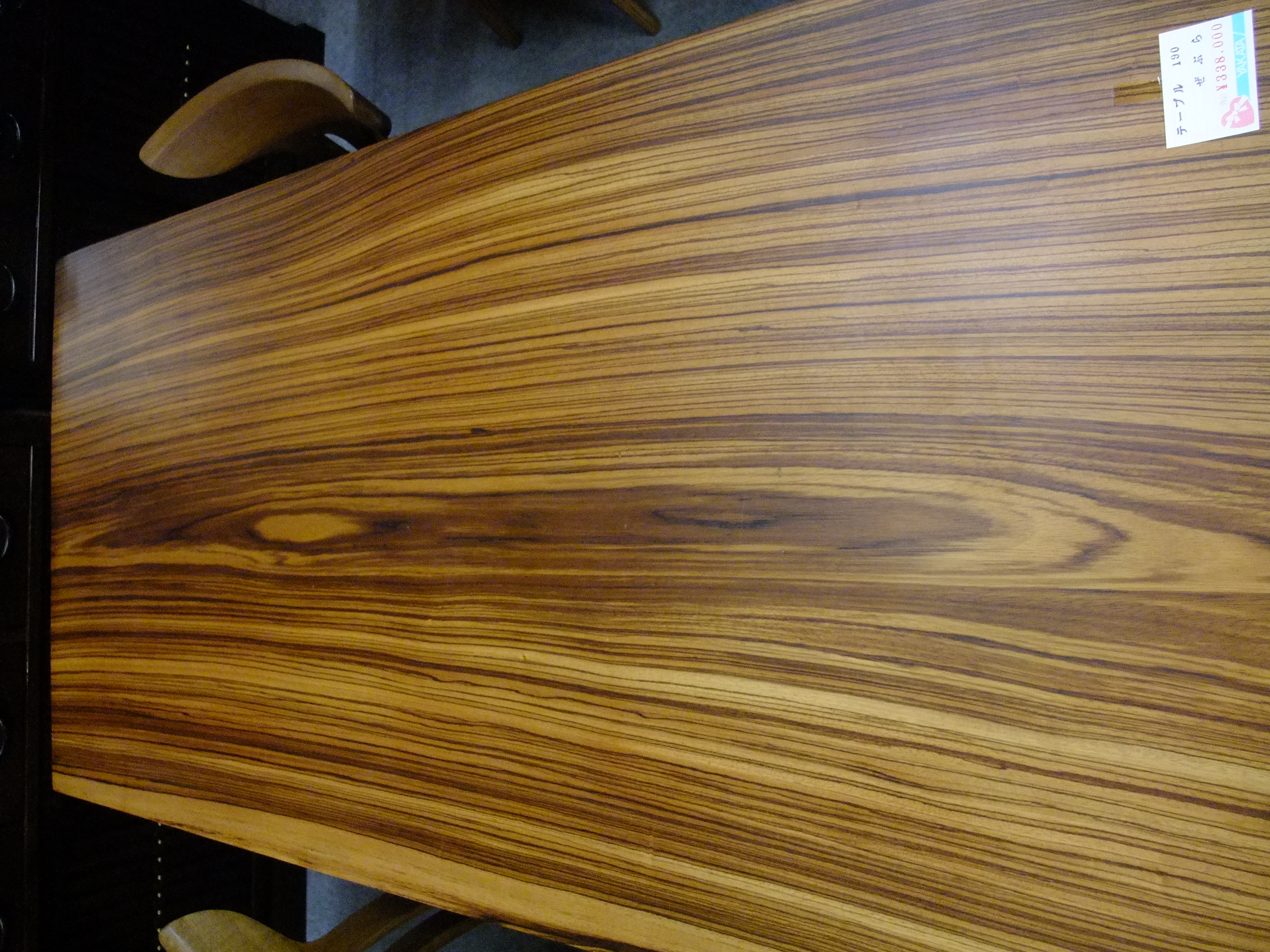
Zebrawood table

An alternative name which occurs in 18th century British sources is palmaletto or palmalatta, from palo mulatto, which was the local name for the wood. At the beginning of the 19th century, another source of zebrawood was found in Brazil. This species, Astronium fraxinifolium, is native to northern South America, especially north-eastern Brazil. It is now traded as gonçalo alves, a Portuguese name used in Brazil. On the European and American markets, however, it was still called zebrawood, and commonly used in British furniture-making between about 1810 and 1860.

For most of the 19th century, the botanical identity of zebrawood was unknown. For many years, it was thought to be the product of Omphalobium lambertii DC., later reclassified as Connarus guianensis Lamb ex DC., and finally as Connarus lambertii (DC.) Britton. Despite similarities between the timbers of Connarus and Astronium, the former has yet to be identified on surviving furniture. "Published statements that certain species [of Connarus] supply furniture woods are undoubtedly incorrect."

In the 20th century, the name zebrawood, as applied to Astronium species, went out of use. The word now usually refers to wood of the very different African tree Microberlinia brazzavillensis, but may be applied to other woods, mostly belonging to the same family Fabaceae, but not exclusively so, for example: Brachystegia spiciformis, gonçalo alves.

== Zebrawood proper ==
The wood of Microberlinia (also known as Zebrano) is imported from central Africa, (Gabon, Cameroon, and Congo). The heartwood is a pale golden yellow, distinct from the very pale color of the sapwood and features narrow streaks of dark brown to black. Zebrawood can also be a pale brown with regular or irregular marks of dark brown in varying widths. It is almost always quartersawn to get the exciting alternating color pattern.

It is a heavy hardwood with a somewhat coarse texture, often with an interlocked or wavy grain. The interlocked grain of this wood, like that of many tropical woods, can make it difficult to work. It is also a decorative exotic wood, used in a limited way for veneer, wall paneling, custom furniture, furniture trim, inlay bandings, marquetry, specialty items and turnery. It is also sometimes seen as stocks of shotguns and rifles or in exotic guitars. In the past, it was used in Cadillac and Mercedes-Benz automobiles. Because of its hardness, it can also be used for skis and tool handles.
