= Capão da Imbuia Wood =

Bosque do Capão da Imbuia
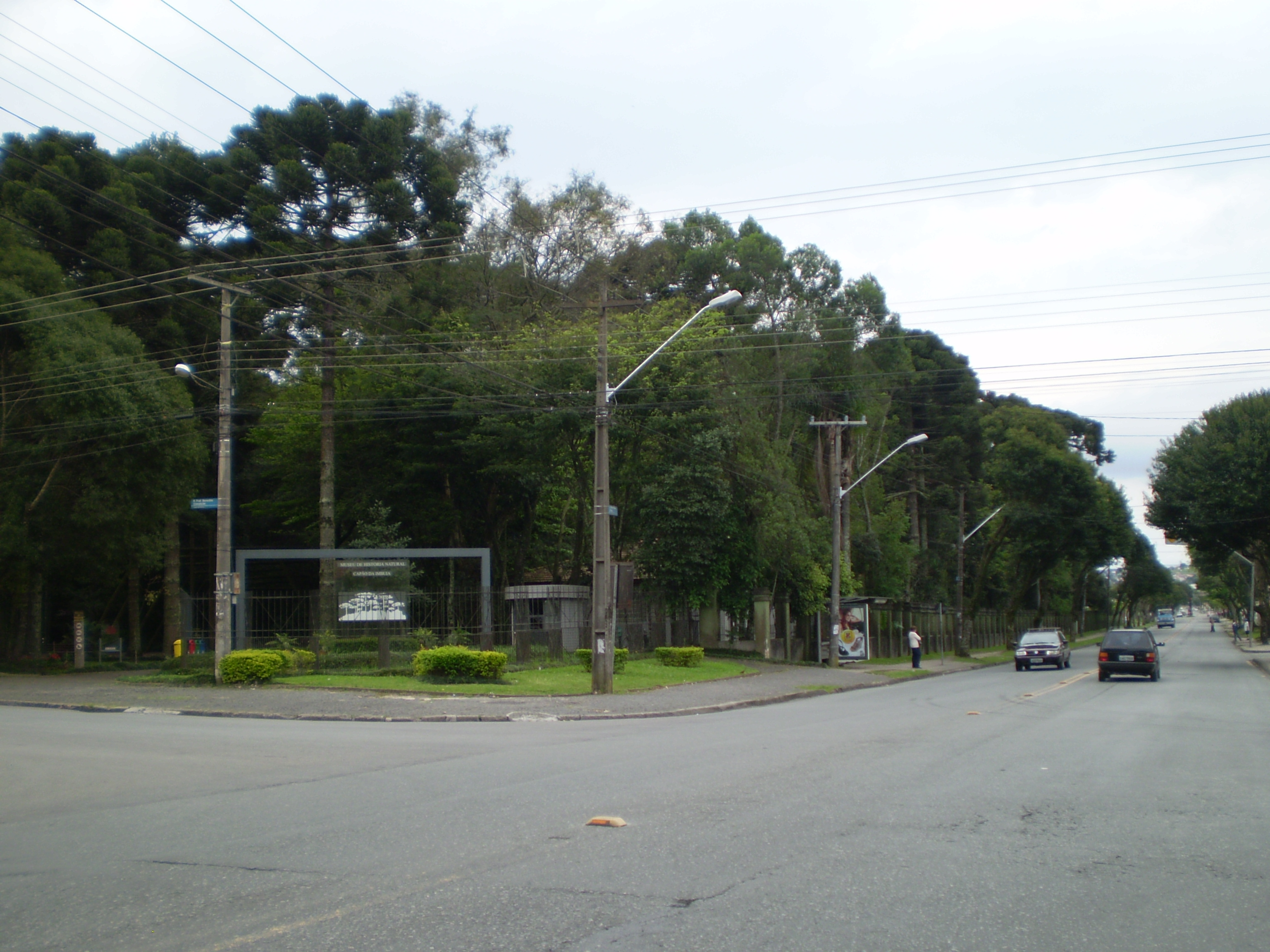
- The entrance to the woods
- Interactive map of Bosque do Capão da Imbuia
- Location: Curitiba, Brazil
- Coordinates: 25°26′09″S 49°13′10″W
- Area: 42.417 m^{2} (456.57 sq ft)
- Operator: Curitiba City Hall

The Capão da Imbuia Woods (Brazilian Portuguese: Bosque do Capão da Imbuia) is a public area of the city of Curitiba, the capital of the state of Paraná, in Brazil.

With a large expanse of native forest (39,000 m²), the woods have several features, such as a path in the woods known as "Path of the Araucaria", a metal catwalk that loops around the woods, and the "Museum of Natural History", with stuffed animals, skeletons, pictures and many more exhibits that show the typical fauna and flora of Brazil. The woods also house a closed biological research site.

The place is also known for its large population of native agoutis, which live freely on the woods. The woods serve as breeding grounds for them, and from times to time the mayor hall reintroduces the species in other woods and parks around the city.

The woods are home to the oldest tree in the city, an Ocotea porosa almost a thousand years old.

== Bibliography ==
- SGANZERLA, Eduardo, RODRIGUES, Júlio C.. Curitiba. Curitiba: (publication) P.M.C., 1996. 310 p.
