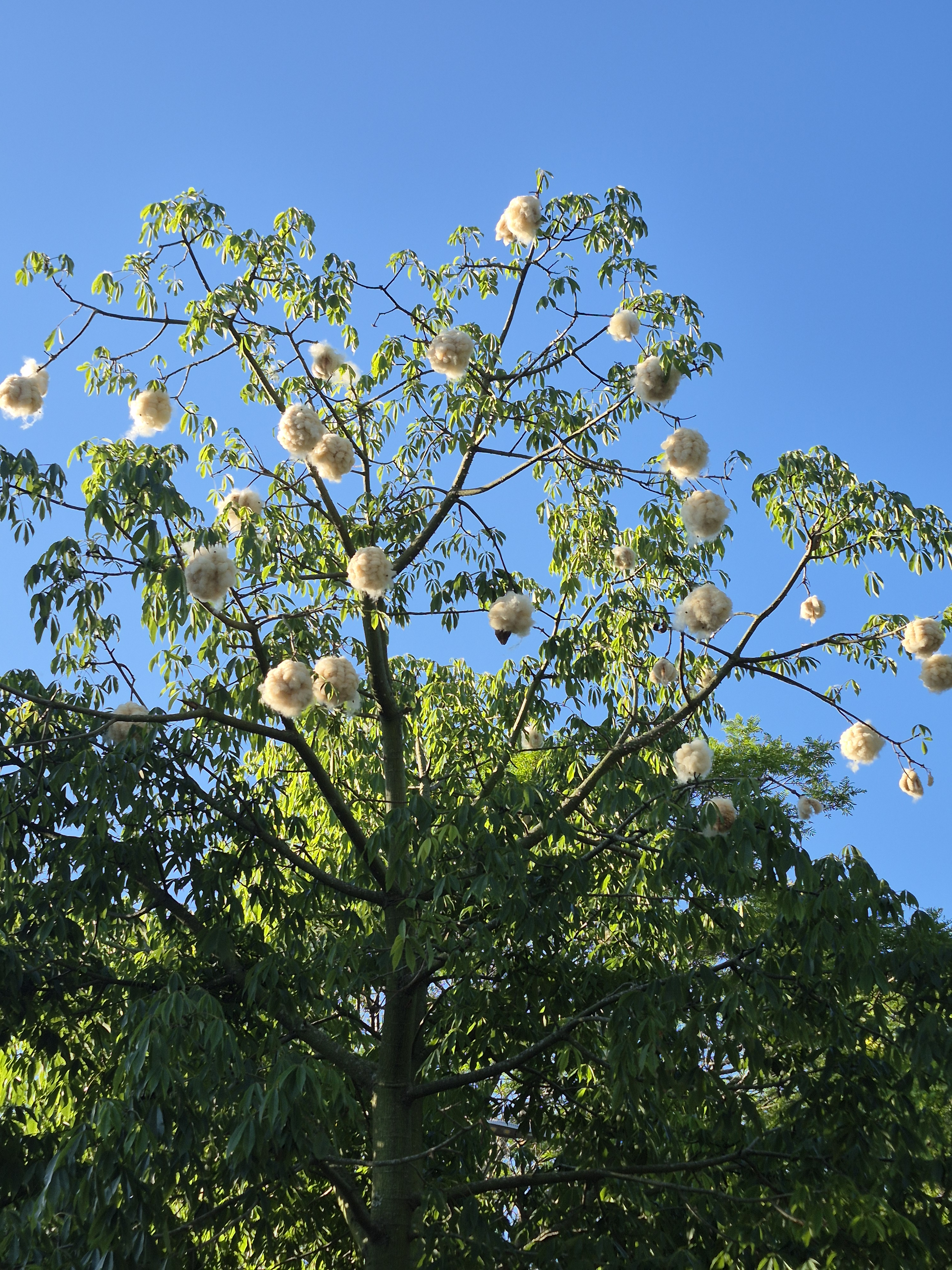

Scientific classification
- Kingdom: Plantae
- Clade: Tracheophytes
- Clade: Angiosperms
- Clade: Eudicots
- Clade: Rosids
- Order: Malvales
- Family: Malvaceae
- Genus: Ceiba
- Species: C. speciosa

Binomial name
- Ceiba speciosa (A.St.-Hil., A.Juss. & Cambess.) Ravenna

Synonyms
- Chorisia speciosa A.St.-Hil., A.Juss. & Cambess.; Bombax aculeatum Vell.; Chorisia speciosa var. minor Chodat; Chorisia speciosa var. paraguariensis Hassl.

= Ceiba speciosa =

Species of tree

Ceiba speciosa, the floss silk tree (formerly Chorisia speciosa), is a species of deciduous tree that is native to the tropical and subtropical forests of South America. It has several local common names, such as palo borracho (in Spanish literally "drunken stick"), or árbol del puente, samu'ũ (in Guarani), or paineira (in Brazilian Portuguese). In Bolivia, it is called toborochi, meaning "tree of refuge" or "sheltering tree". In the USA it often is called the silk floss tree. It belongs to the same subfamily as the baobab; the species Bombax ceiba; and other kapok trees. Another tree of the same genus, Ceiba chodatii, is often referred to by the same common names.

== Description ==
The natural range of the floss silk tree is in the northeast of Argentina, east of Bolivia, Paraguay, Uruguay, and southern Brazil. It is resistant to drought and moderate cold. It grows fast in spurts when water is abundant, and sometimes reaches more than 25 metres (82 ft) in height. Its trunk is bottle-shaped, generally bulging in its lower third, measuring up to 2 metres (7 ft) in girth. The trunk is studded with large, sharp, conical prickles that deter wild animals from climbing the trees. In younger trees, the trunk is green due to its high chlorophyll content, which makes it capable of performing photosynthesis when leaves are absent; with age it turns to gray.

=== Leaves, stems, and flowers ===
The branches tend to be horizontal and also are covered with prickles. The leaves are composed of five to seven long leaflets. The flowers are creamy-whitish in the center and pink toward the tips of their five petals. They measure 10 to 15 centimetres (4 to 6 in) in diameter and their shape is superficially similar to hibiscus flowers. Their nectar is known to attract insect pollinators and hummingbirds. C. speciosa flowers are in bloom between February and May (in its native Southern Hemisphere), but it may bloom at other times of the year, even as late as November in Florida. The flowers of the related C. chodatii are similar in form and size, but their color goes from creamy white centers to yellow tips. As a deciduous tree, it is completely bare of leaves and flowers during the winter months, especially when growing outside of its native South American habitat.

=== Fruits ===
The fruits are lignous ovoid capsules, 20 centimetres (8 in) long, which contain bean-sized black seeds surrounded by a mass of fibrous, fluffy matter reminiscent of cotton or silk.

== Uses ==
The 'cotton' inside the capsules, although not so good quality as that of the kapok tree, has been used as stuffing (density = 0.27 g/cm^{3}). The wood can be used to make canoes, as wood pulp, and to make paper. The bark has been used to make ropes. From the seeds, it is possible to obtain vegetable oil (both edible and industrially useful).

The floss silk tree is cultivated mostly for ornamental purposes. Outside of private gardens around the world, it is often planted along urban streets in subtropical areas such as in Spain, South Africa, Australia, northern New Zealand, and the southern USA, although its prickled trunks and limbs require establishing safety buffer zones around the tree in order to protect people and domesticated animals.

Species of Ceiba play a significant role in the shamanic religions of indigenous people of the Caribbean and Amazonian regions, and some cultures use it in versions of the hallucinogenic drink Ayahuasca.

== Gallery ==
Trunk and canopy
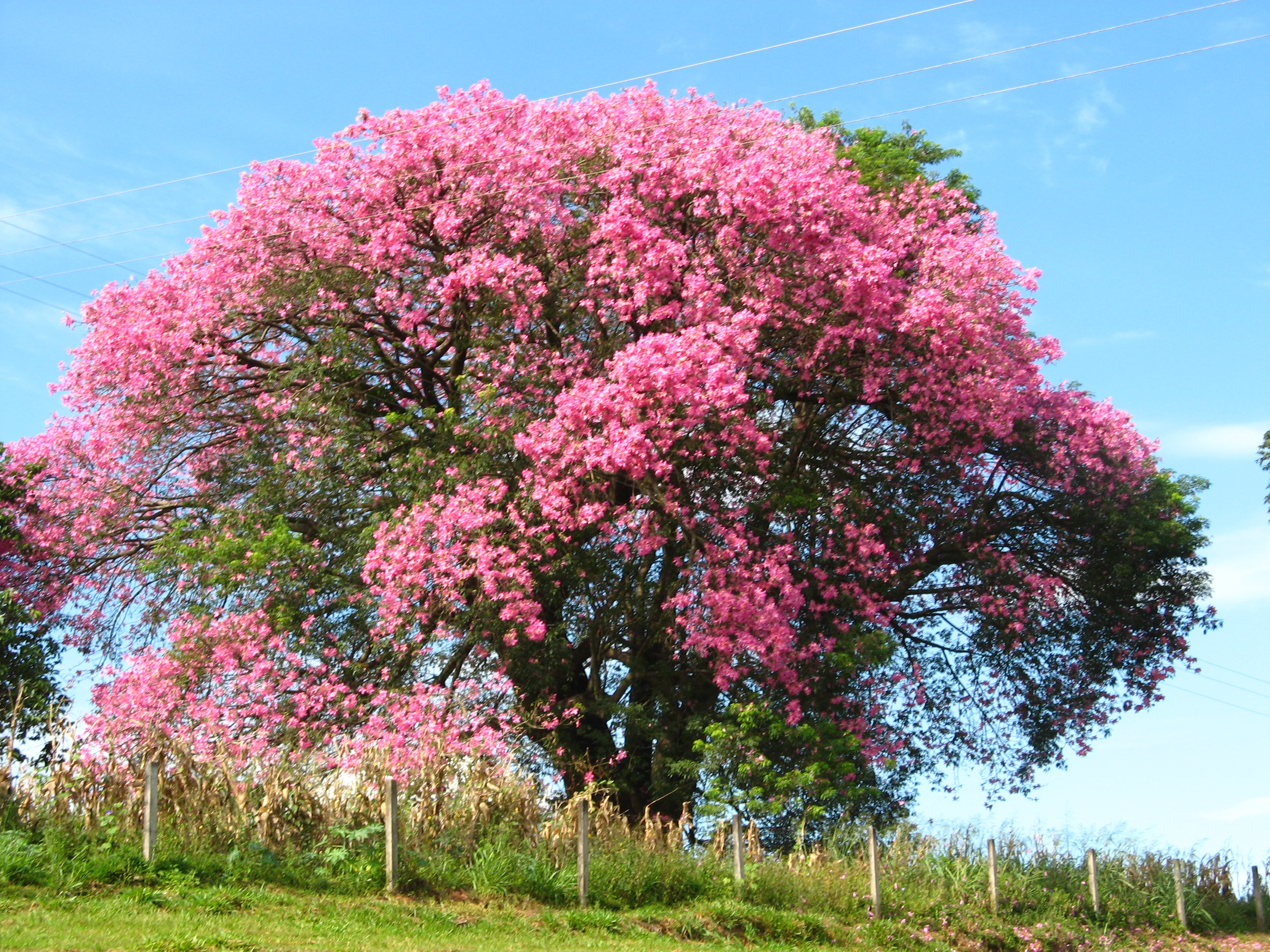

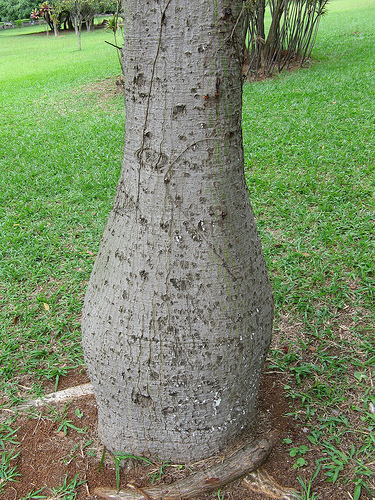
Swollen trunk

Trunk of an old tree

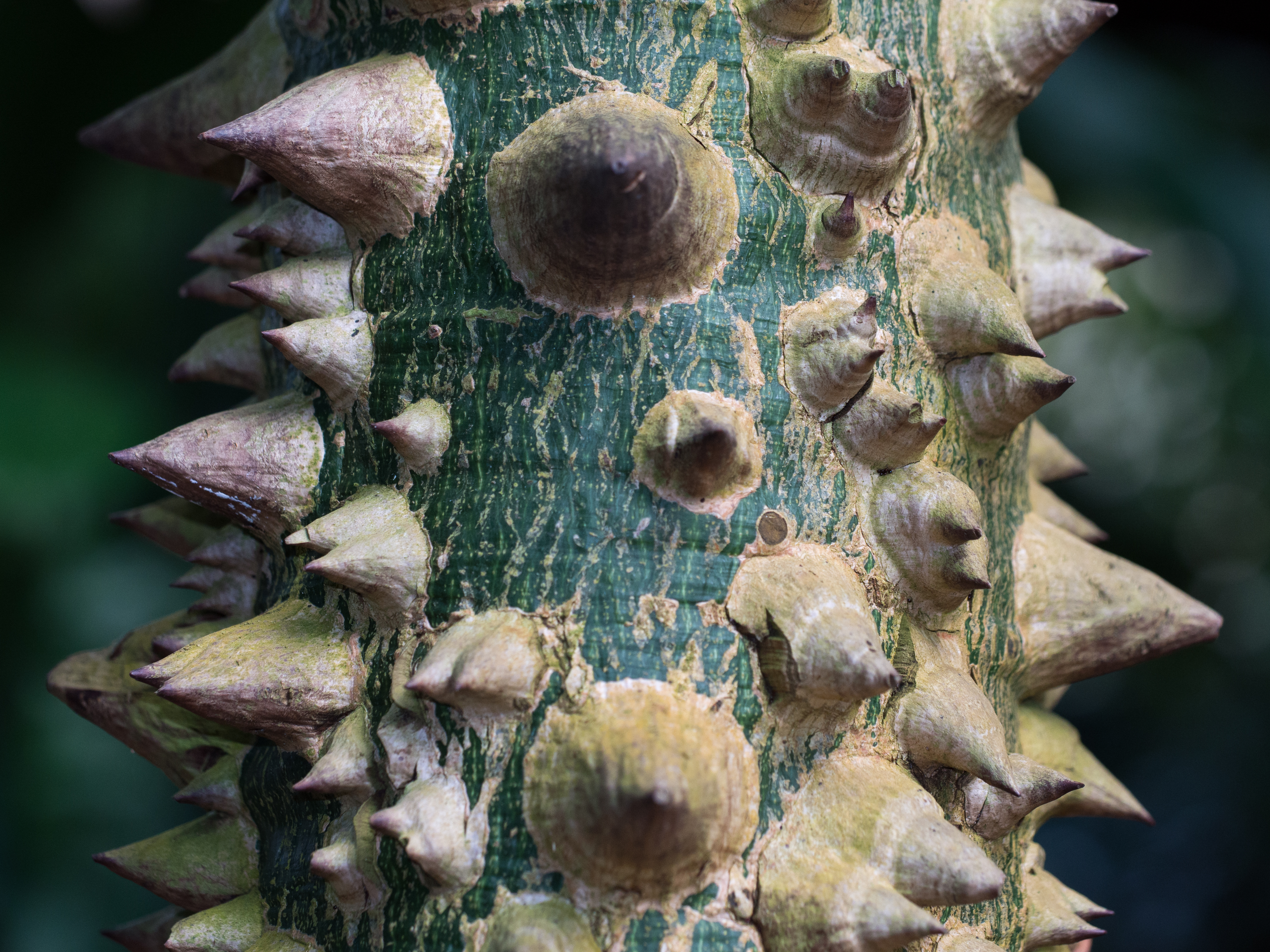
Large thorns on the trunk

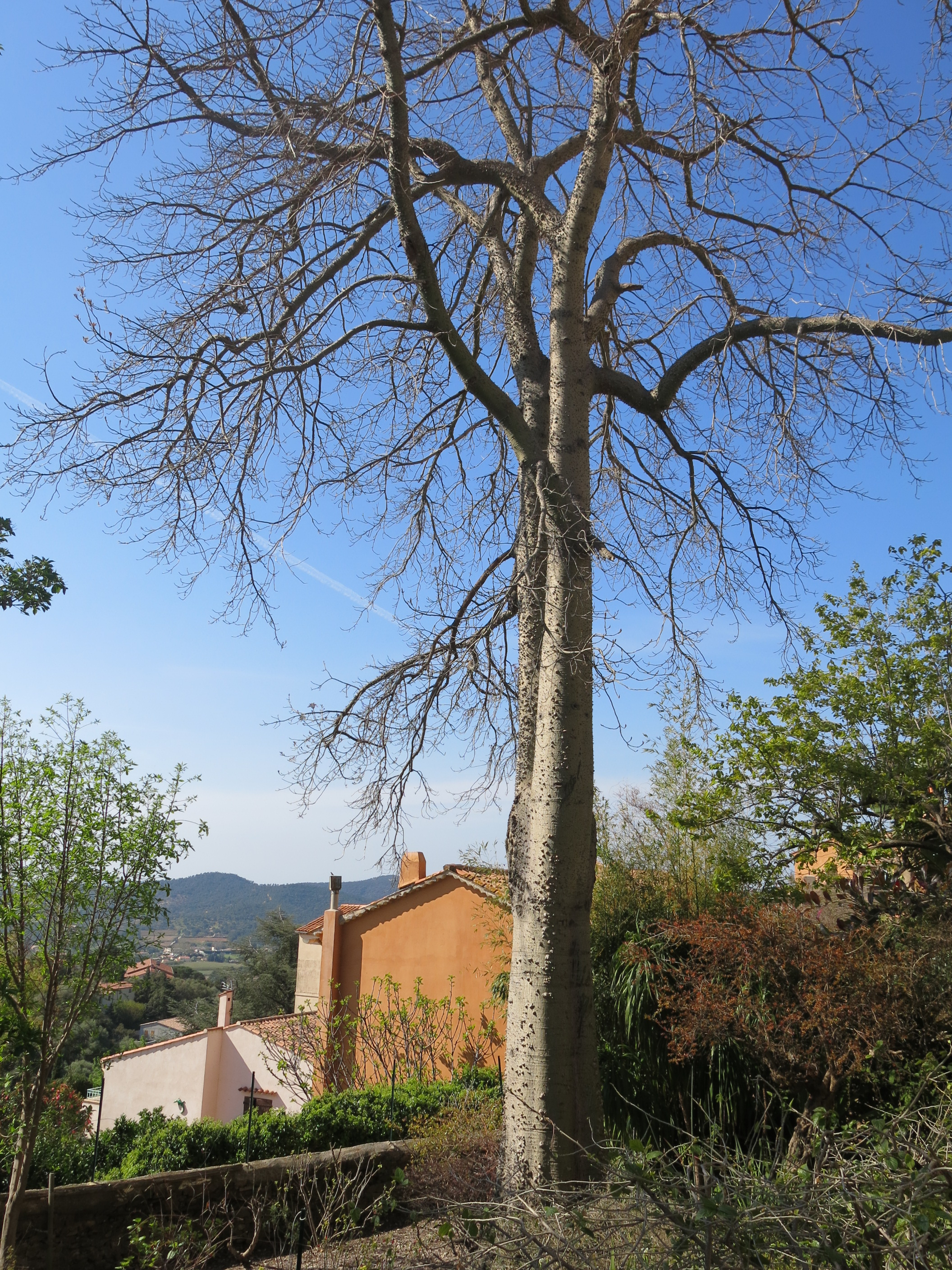
Leafless in winter

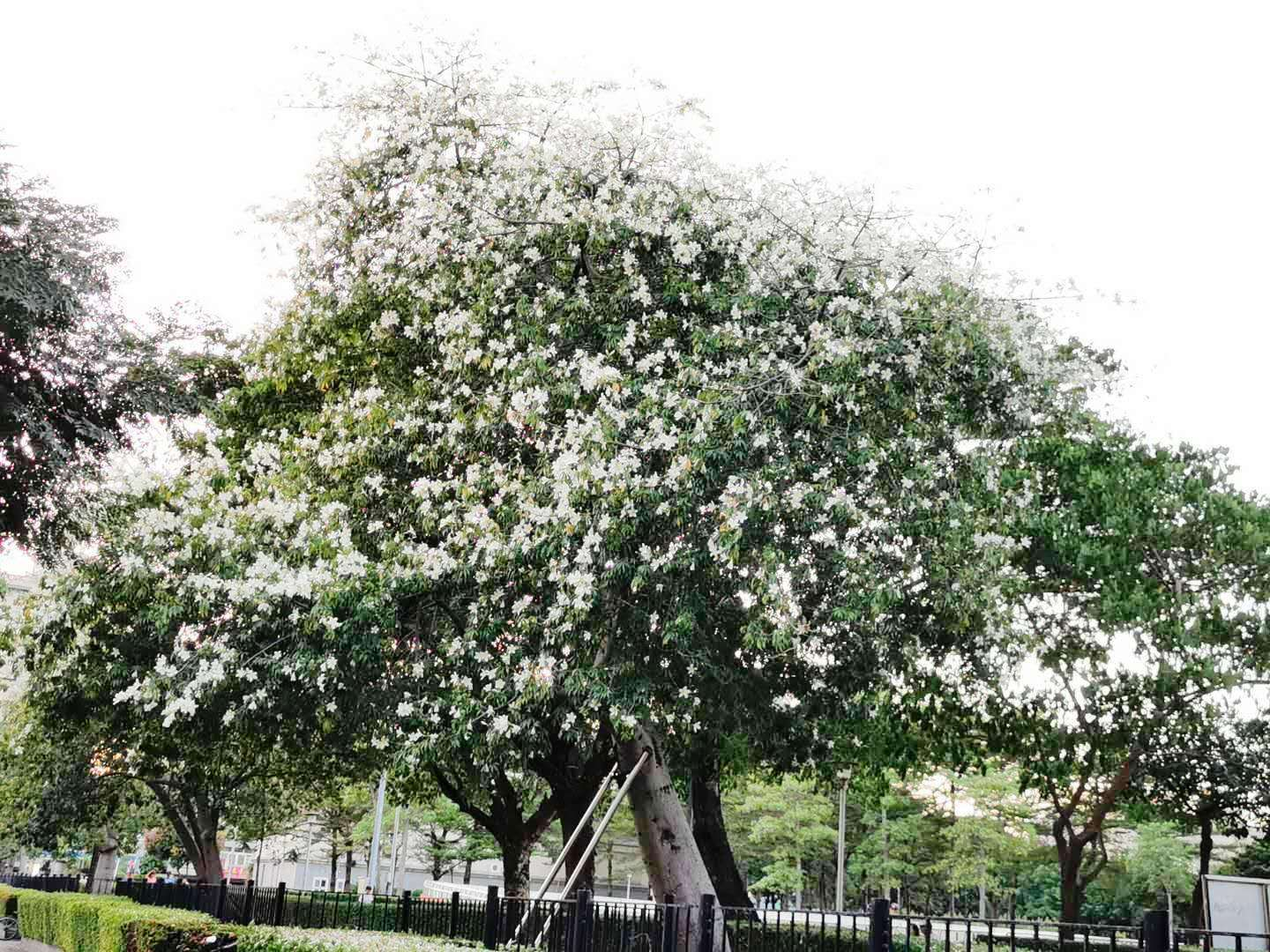
Flowers
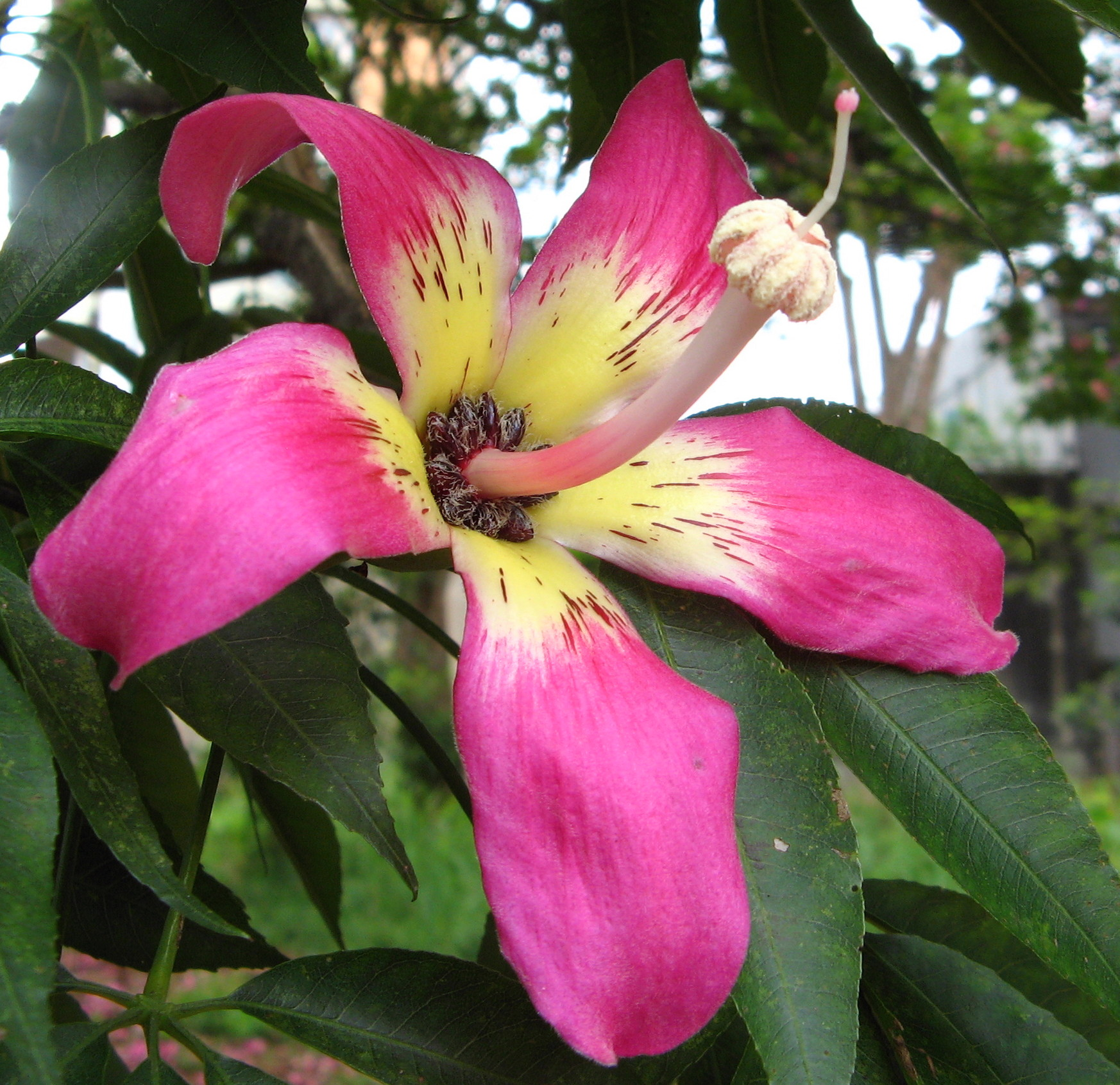

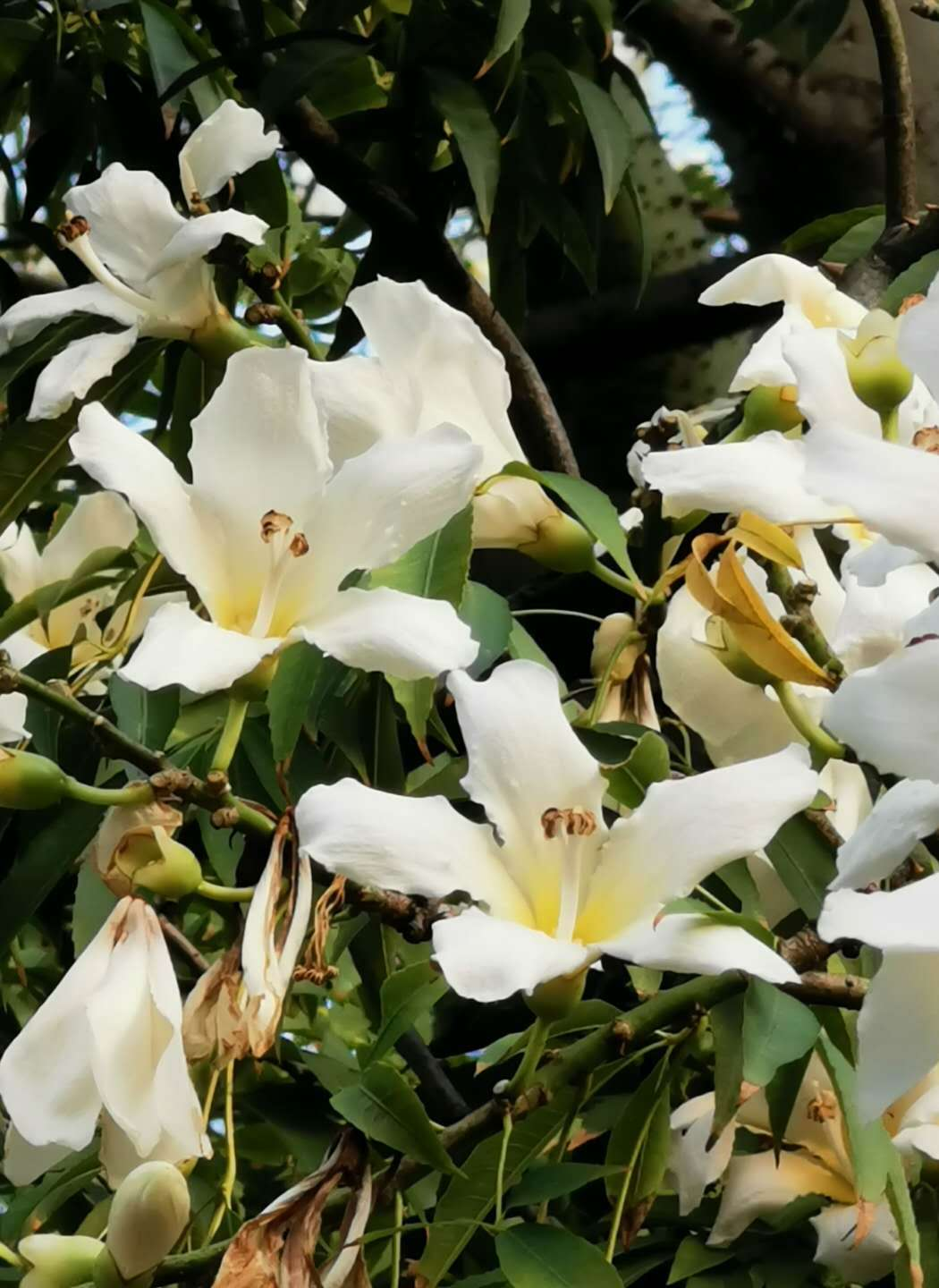

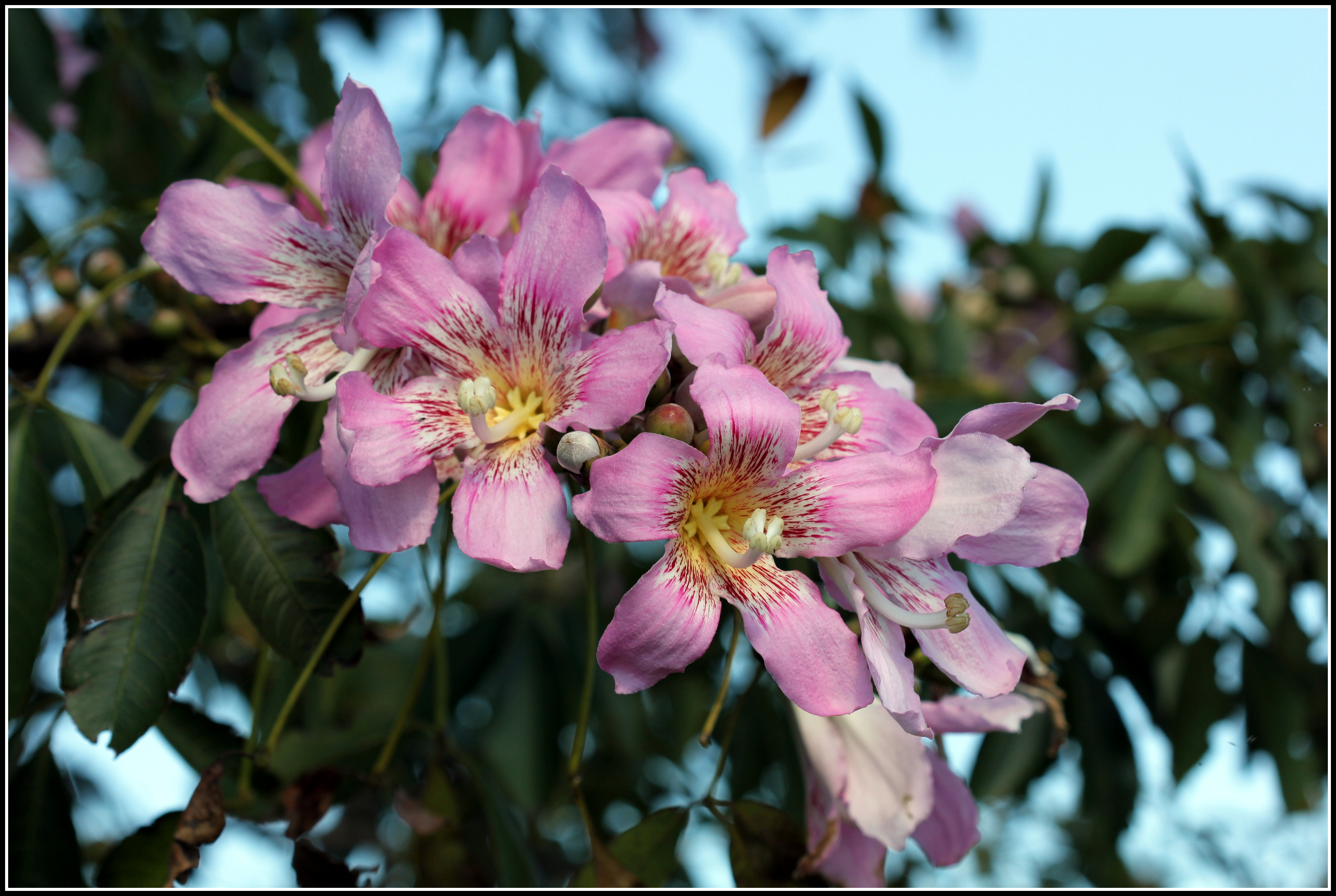

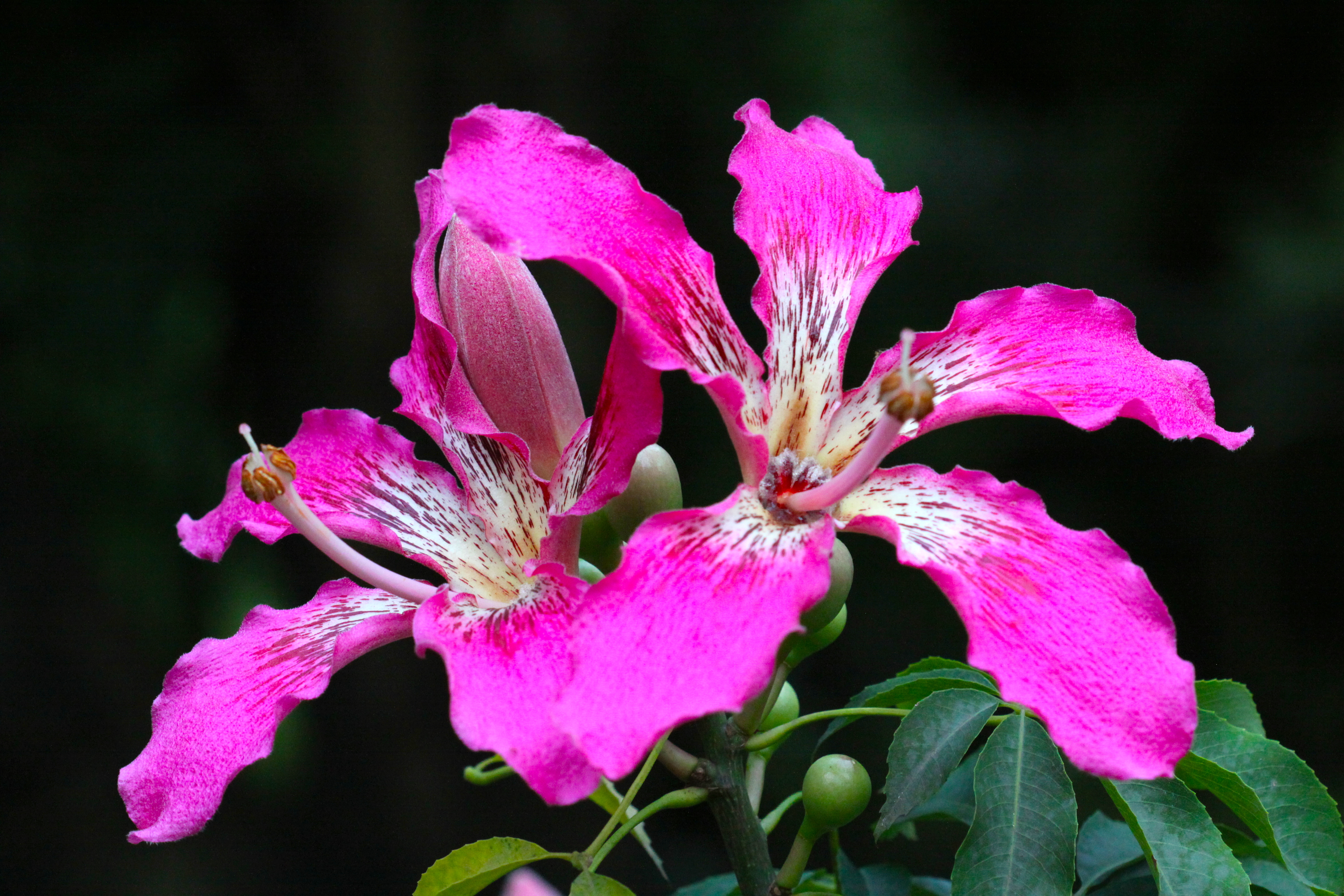

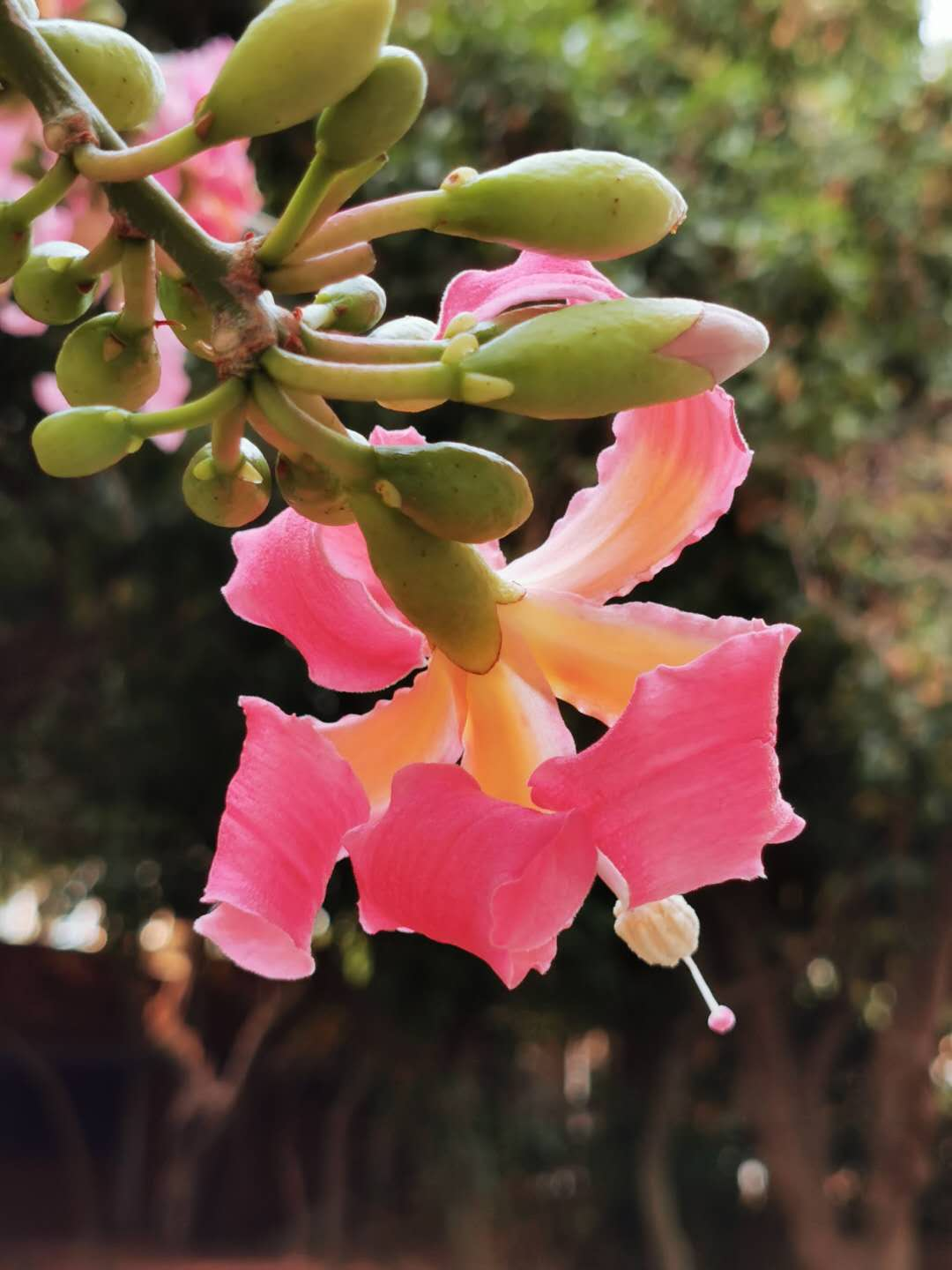
Fruit & seeds
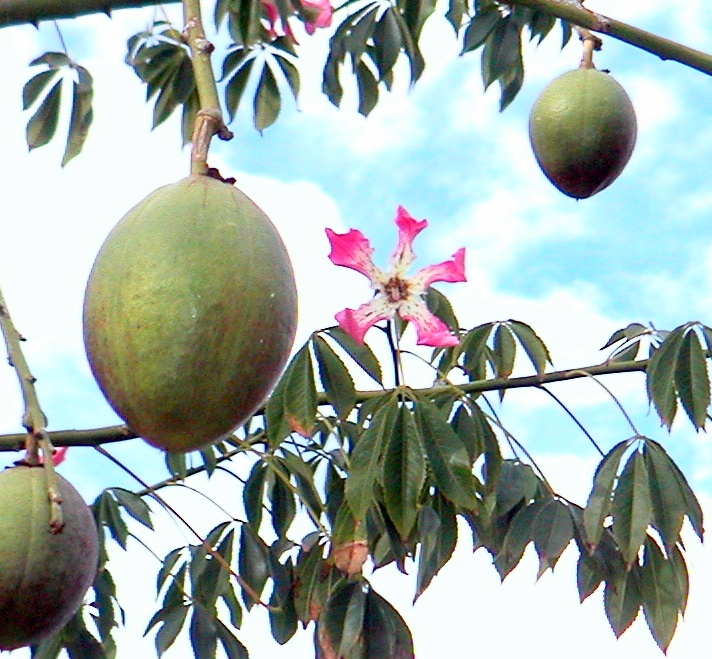

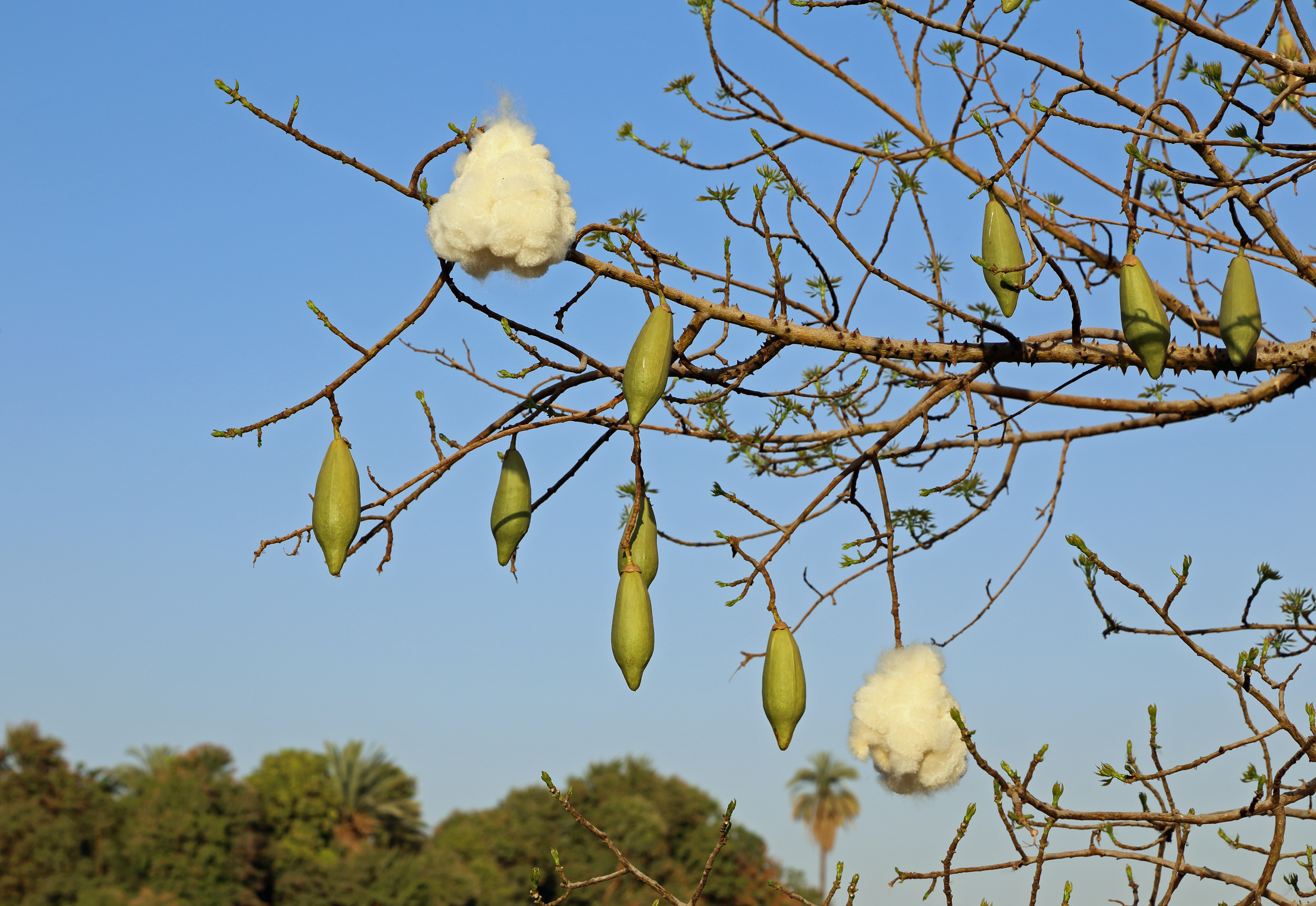

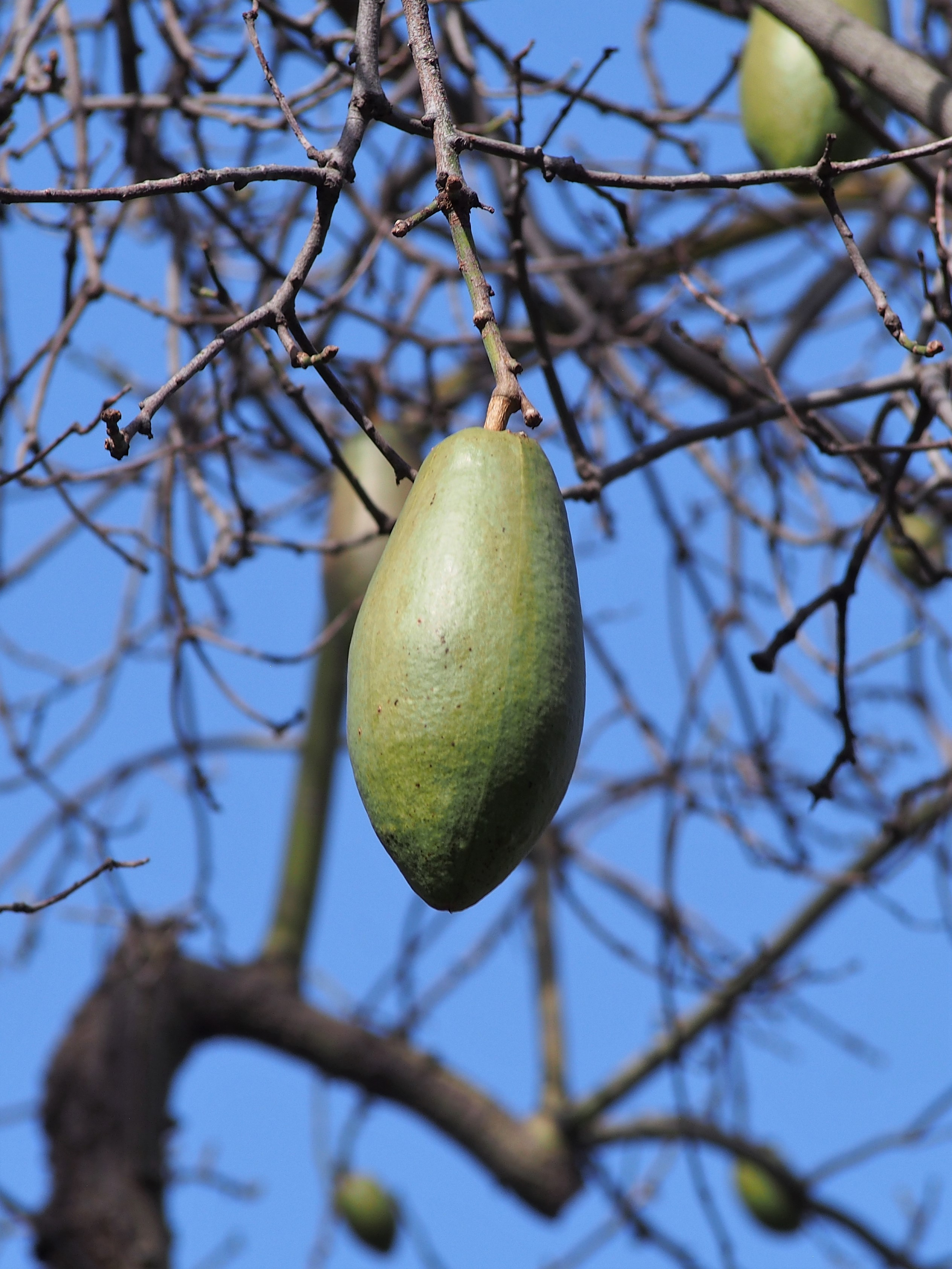

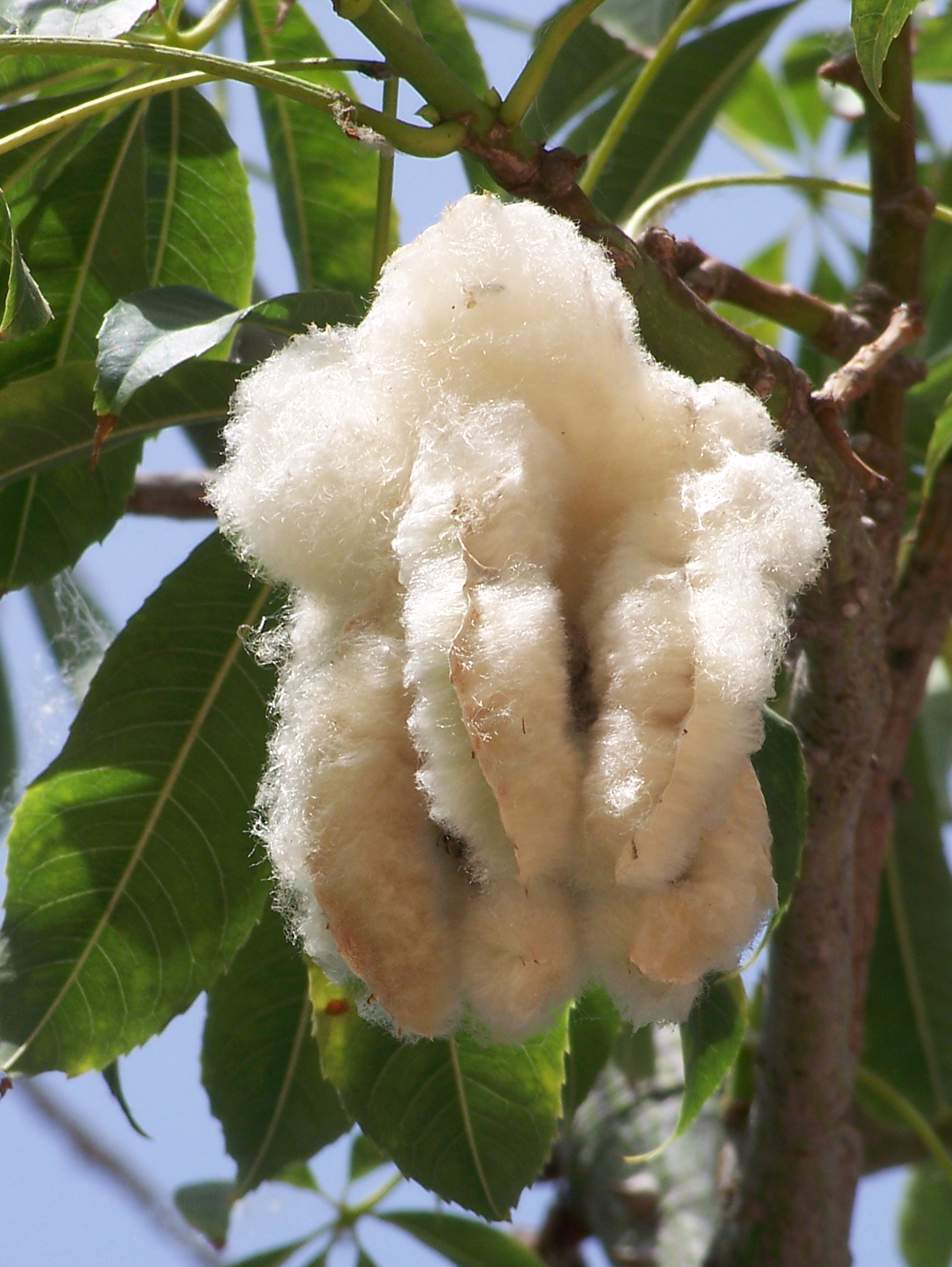

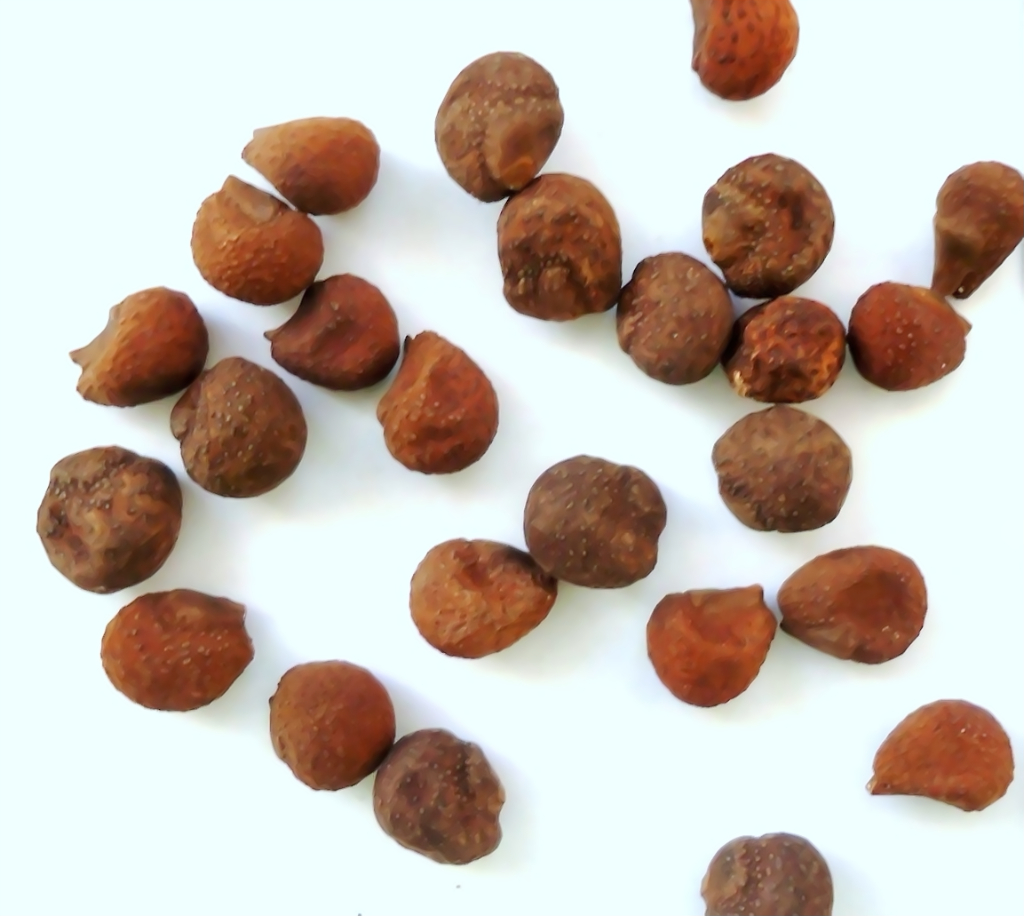
