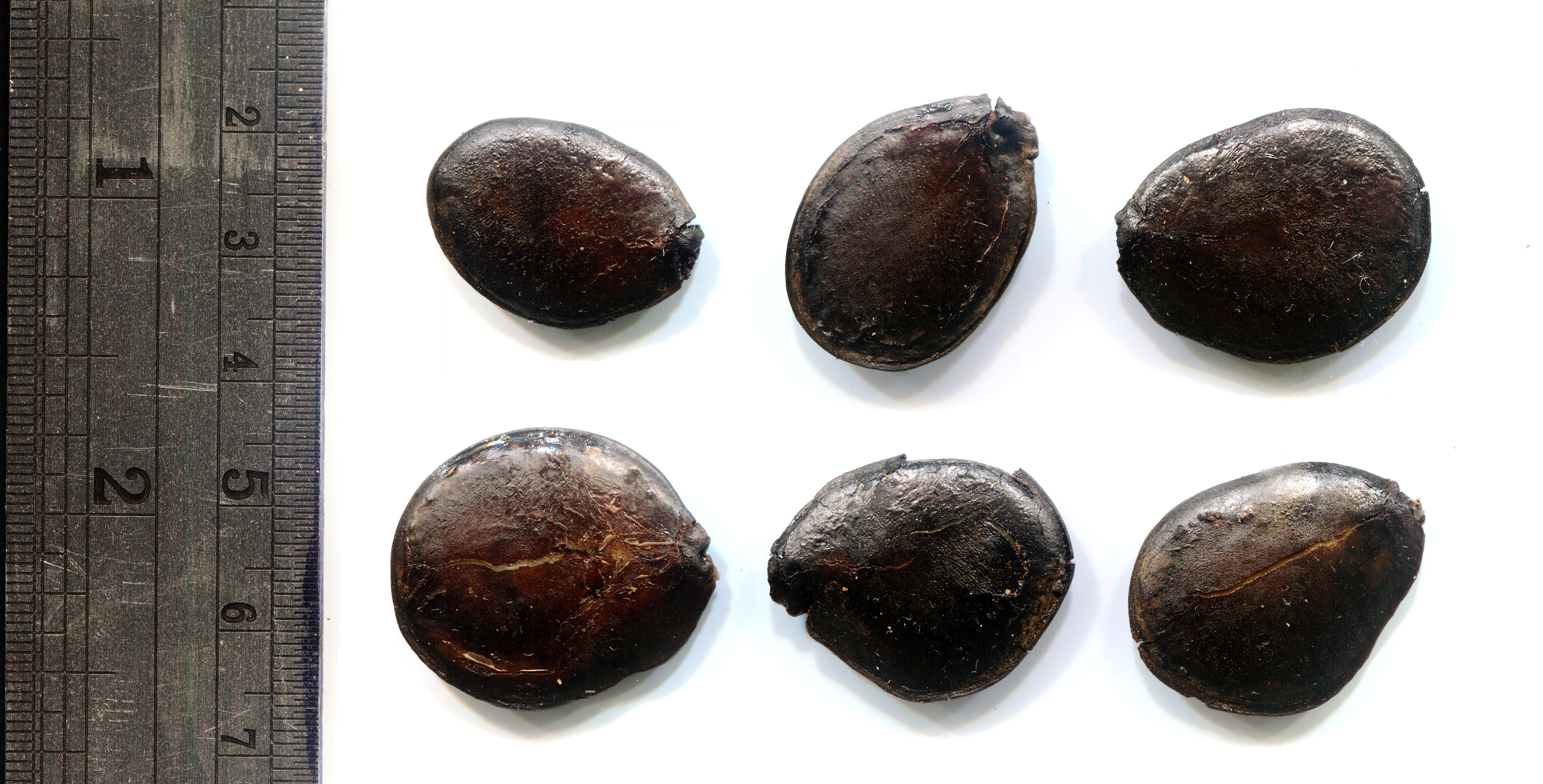
- Seeds of Microberlinia brazzavillensis

Conservation status
- Vulnerable (IUCN 2.3)

Scientific classification
- Kingdom: Plantae
- Clade: Tracheophytes
- Clade: Angiosperms
- Clade: Eudicots
- Clade: Rosids
- Order: Fabales
- Family: Fabaceae
- Genus: Microberlinia
- Species: M. brazzavillensis

Binomial name
- Microberlinia brazzavillensis A.Chev.

Synonyms
- Berlinia brazzavillensis (A.Chev.) Troupin

= Microberlinia brazzavillensis =

Species of legume

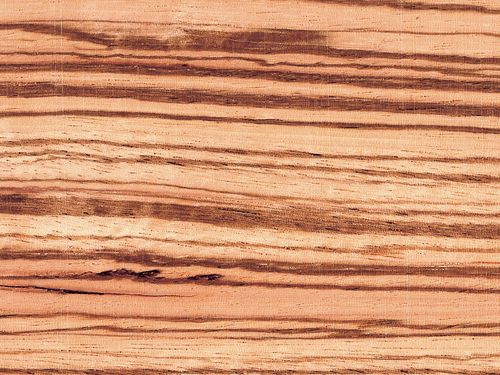
The texture of Microberlinia Brazzavillensis wood

Microberlinia brazzavillensis is a tree in the family Leguminosae, found in West Africa. It is also called zebrano, zingana, and allen ele, and is commonly sold in the US as zebrawood. The tree is tall and straight, growing up to 40 m in height with a diameter of up to 1 m. The flower has white petals and, as other legumes do, the tree produces pods.

Concern is expressed due to the tree's rarity in some areas of its native tropical habitat in Gabon and Cameroon, typically less than one tree per square kilometre. It is listed on The IUCN Red List of Threatened Species as vulnerable

The wood is pale yellow to almost white with dark streaks, and it takes a nice polish. The wood is valued by some for its striped figure and is used in furniture. The wood is very tough and durable, and it can be used for objects such as tool handles and sporting equipment. It is resistant to termites and wood-rotting fungi.
