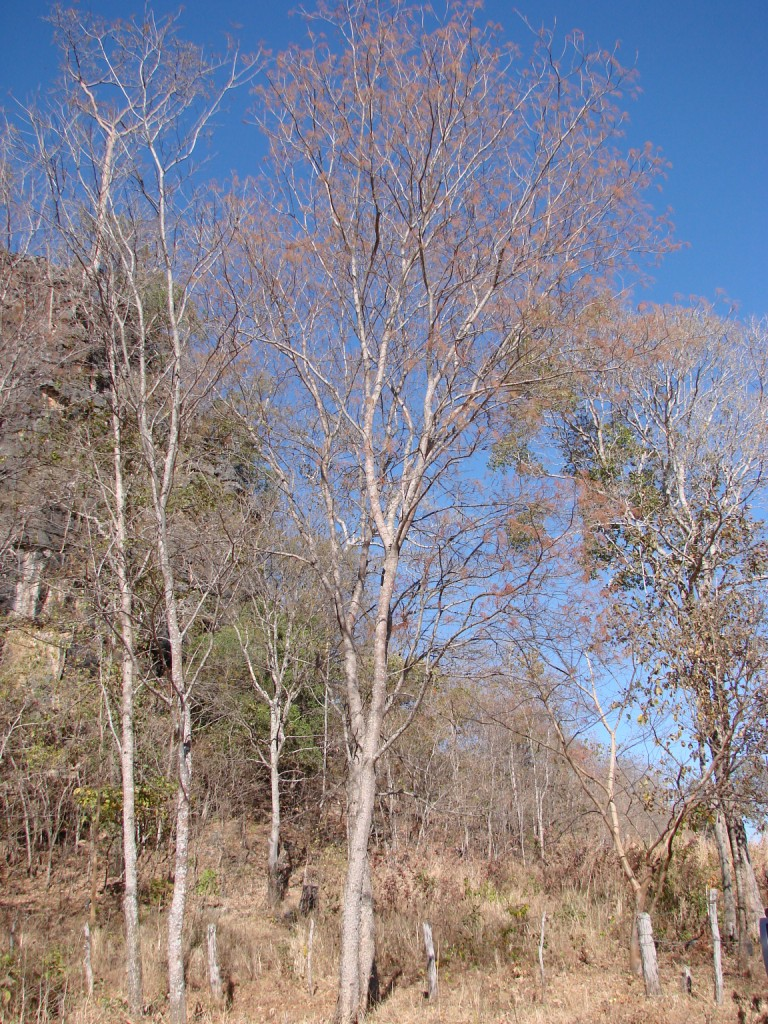
- Myracrodruon urundeuva

Scientific classification
- Kingdom: Plantae
- Clade: Tracheophytes
- Clade: Angiosperms
- Clade: Eudicots
- Clade: Rosids
- Order: Sapindales
- Family: Anacardiaceae
- Genus: Myracrodruon; Allemão & M.Allemão

Species
- See text.

= Myracrodruon =

Genus of plants

Myracrodruon is a genus of plants in the family Anacardiaceae. Species are native to South America (Argentina, Bolivia, Brazil and Paraguay).

== Taxonomy ==
The genus name first appeared in 1862 in a publication by Francisco Freire Allemão and Manoel Allemão. As of September 2021, the International Plant Names Index attributes authorship of the genus to both individuals, whereas other sources use only the first.

Myracrodruon may also treated as a synonym of Astronium.

=== Species ===
As of September 2021, Plants of the World Online accepted two species:

- Myracrodruon balansae (Engl.) Santin
- Myracrodruon urundeuva Allemão
