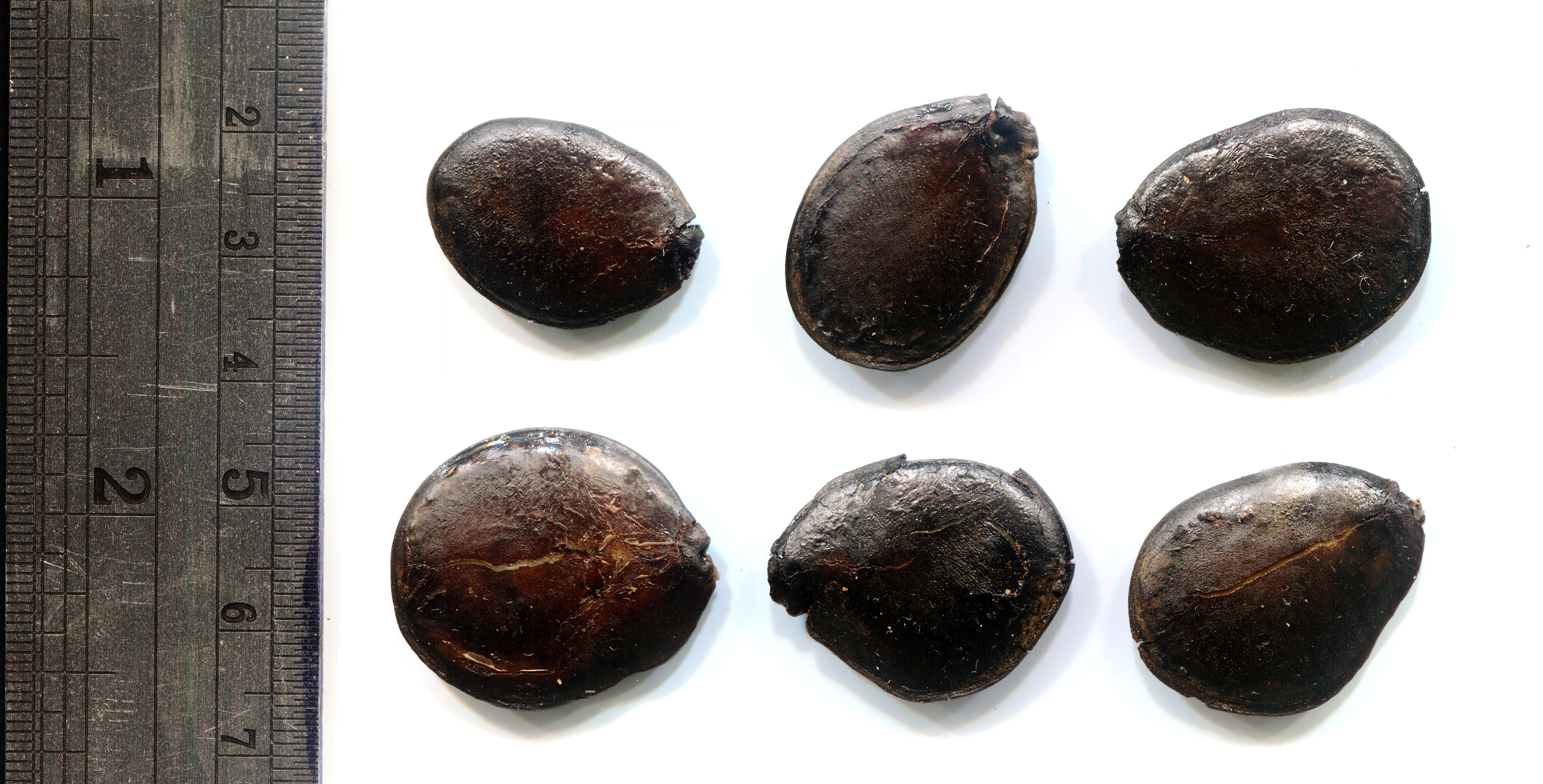
- Microberlinia

Scientific classification
- Kingdom: Plantae
- Clade: Tracheophytes
- Clade: Angiosperms
- Clade: Eudicots
- Clade: Rosids
- Order: Fabales
- Family: Fabaceae
- Subfamily: Detarioideae
- Tribe: Amherstieae
- Genus: Microberlinia; A.Chev. (1946)

Species
- Microberlinia bisulcata A.Chev.; Microberlinia brazzavillensis A.Chev.

= Microberlinia =

Genus of legumes

Microberlinia is a genus of plants in the family Fabaceae (legume family). It includes two species of tree native to Cameroon and Gabon in west-central tropical Africa. The common name is zingana or zebrawood.
