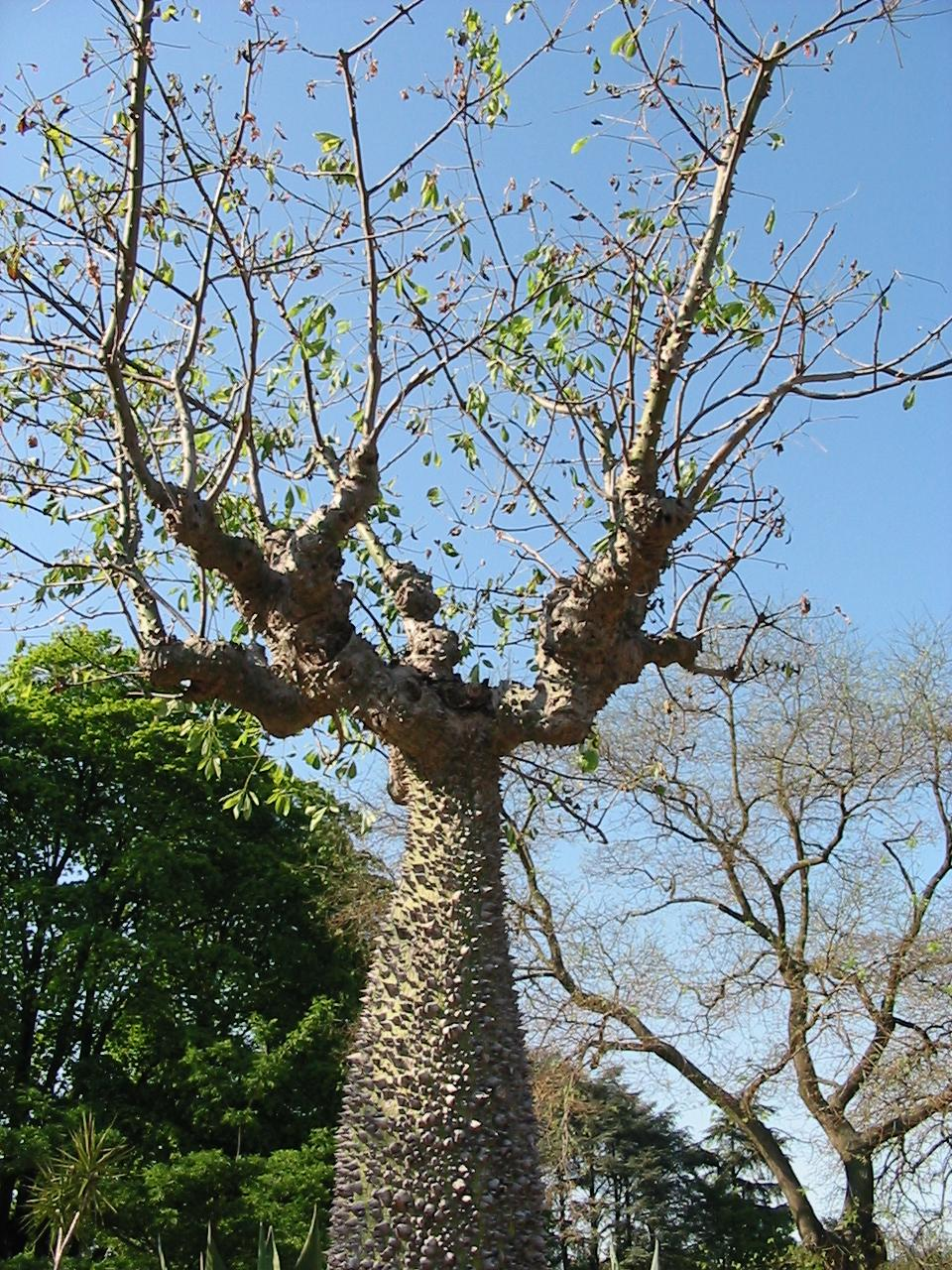

Scientific classification
- Kingdom: Plantae
- Clade: Tracheophytes
- Clade: Angiosperms
- Clade: Eudicots
- Clade: Rosids
- Order: Malvales
- Family: Malvaceae
- Genus: Ceiba
- Species: C. chodatii

Binomial name
- Ceiba chodatii (Hassl.) Ravenna

Synonyms
- Chorisia insignis var. chodatii (Hassl.) Hassl.

= Ceiba chodatii =

Floss silk tree

Species of tree

Ceiba chodatii, the floss silk tree, is a species of deciduous tree native to the tropical and subtropical forests of South America. It has a bottle-shaped swollen trunk in which water is stored for the dry season and is known locally as palo borracho.

== Description ==
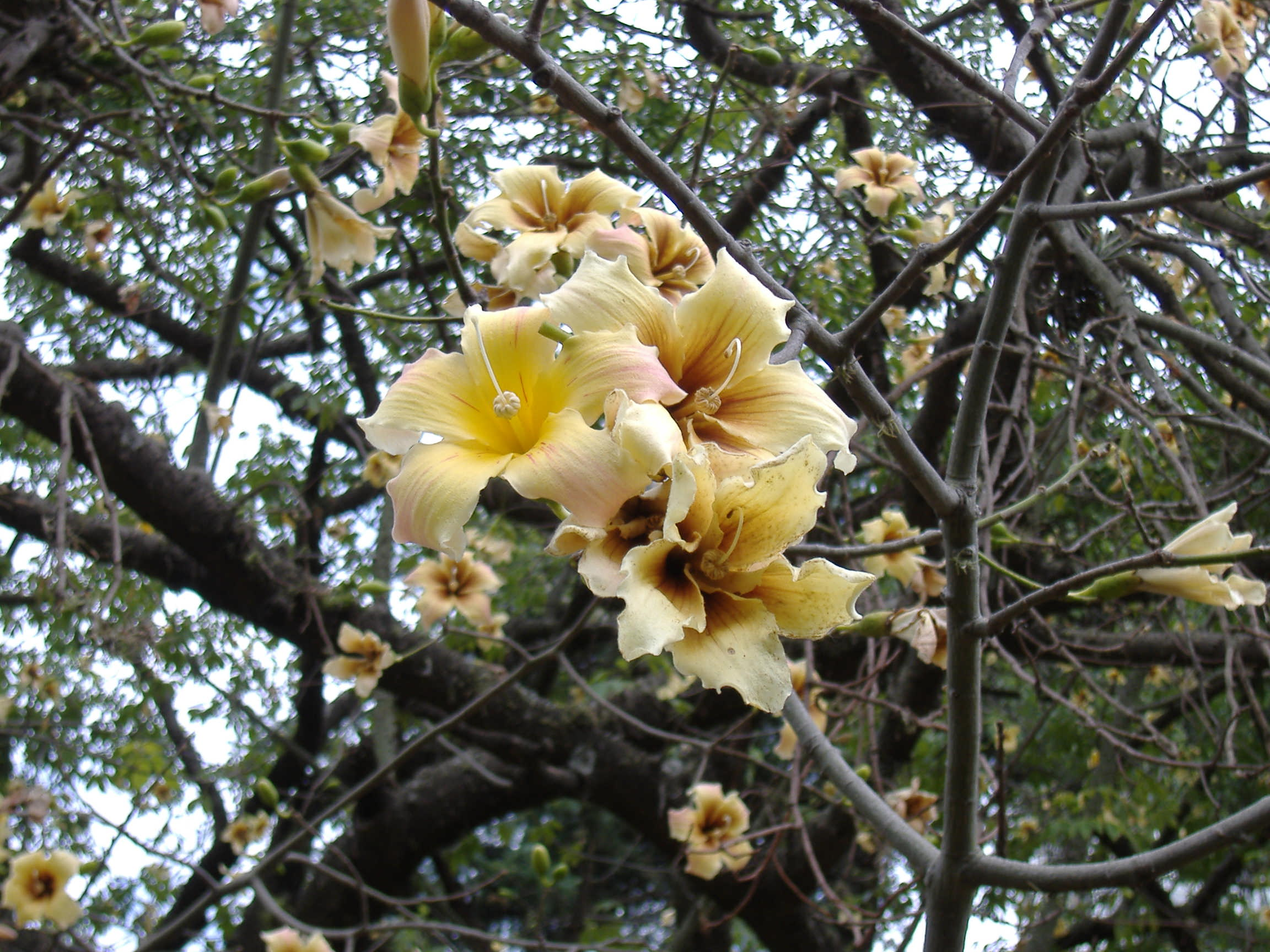
Flowers of Ceiba chodatii

Ceiba chodatii is a medium-sized deciduous tree with a tall, stout, bare trunk. It grows to about 12 metres (39 ft) tall, has a number of thick branches at the top of the swollen trunk and has a rounded crown. The bark is smooth with vertical ridges and horizontal wrinkles. It contains chlorophyll and is green when young and able to photosynthesize, but turns grey with age. It is covered with thick, woody conical spines. The alternate leaves are palmate with five lobes and serrated edges. The flowers are large, solitary and creamy white with a few purple flecks. They are up to 15 centimetres (5.9 in) long with yellow-green calyces and funnel-shaped corollas with five fleshy, hairy petals joined at the base. The fruit is a large, oblong green capsule. When ripe it splits open to reveal black seeds surrounded by a mass of white fibres resembling cotton.

== Distribution and habitat ==
Ceiba chodatii is native to the forests of Bolivia, the Chaco region of Paraguay and the Piedmont Mountains of western Argentina where it is found in seasonally dry woodlands. It flowers between February and May.

== Ecology ==
The flowers open at dusk and are probably pollinated by sphingid moths. Other members of the genus are pollinated by bats but this seems unlikely for Ceiba chodatii as the flowers produce little nectar. Hummingbirds also visit the flowers but do not touch the anthers or stigma. Self-pollination does not occur in this species because of a late-acting form of self-incompatibility.

The bottle-shaped trunk is swollen with water being retained by the tree for use in the dry season. The indigenous people of the Chaco make use of this water for their cattle and the timber is used to make canoes and articles for daily use. Fibres from the trunk are woven into ropes and extracts from the bark are used for tanning and as a dye.

The dry chaco where this tree is found has dense spiny woodlands consisting of low trees and an understorey of Aspidosperma, Astronium, Schinopsis, Ceiba, and Bulnesia. The ground is clad in thorny plants, some with microphylls and others with no leaves and cacti such as Cereus and Stetsonia. Some plants such as Jacaratia accumulate water in tubercles.
