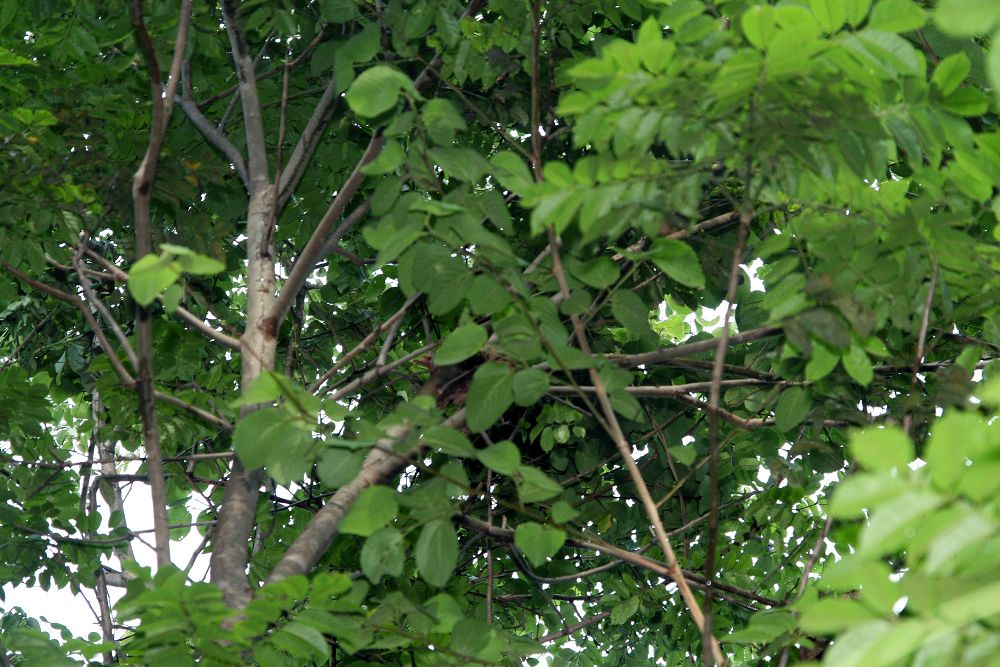
- Astronium graveolens

Scientific classification
- Kingdom: Plantae
- Clade: Tracheophytes
- Clade: Angiosperms
- Clade: Eudicots
- Clade: Rosids
- Order: Sapindales
- Family: Anacardiaceae
- Subfamily: Anacardioideae
- Genus: Astronium; Jacq.

Species
- See text.

= Astronium =

Genus of flowering plants

Astronium is a genus of flowering plants in the cashew family, Anacardiaceae. It is native to Central and South America.

Astronium is a genus of dioecious trees. Leaves are deciduous, alternate, and odd-pinnate.

== Species ==
As of September 2021, Plants of the World Online accepted the following species:

- Astronium concinnum Schott
- Astronium fraxinifolium Schott
- Astronium gardneri Mattick
- Astronium glaziovii Mattick
- Astronium graveolens Jacq. (syn. Astronium conzattii S.F.Blake)
- Astronium lecointei Ducke
- Astronium mirandae F.A.Barkley
- Astronium nelson-rosae Santin
- Astronium obliquum Griseb.
- Astronium pumilum J.D.Mitch. & Daly
- Astronium ulei Mattick

Species formerly placed in this genus that are now placed in Myracrodruon include:

- Astronium balansae Engl. → Myracrodruon balansae
- Astronium urundeuva → Myracrodruon urundeuva

== Fossil record ==
Fossils of an Astronium sp. have been described from the fossil flora of Kızılcahamam district in Turkey, which is of early Pliocene age.
