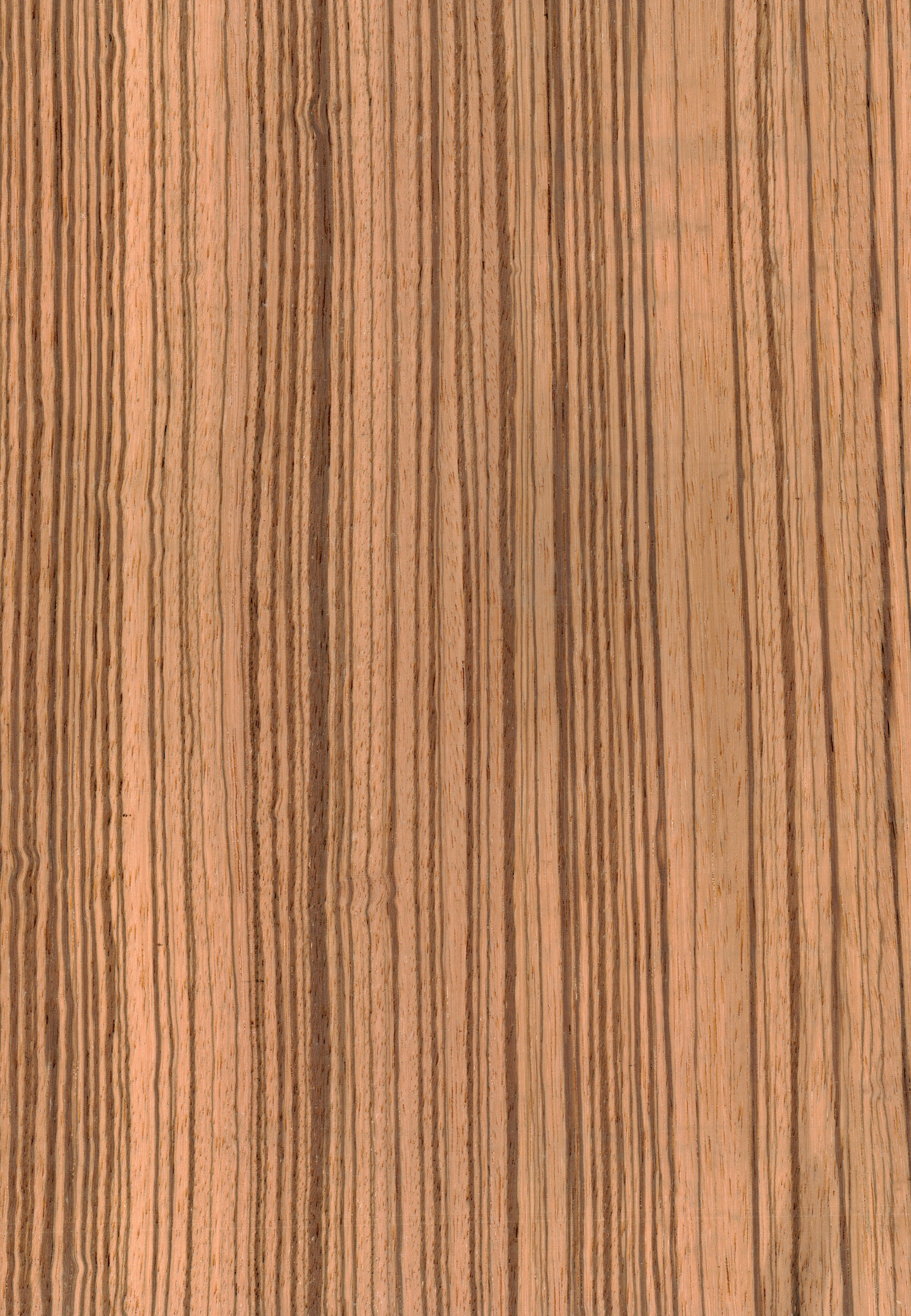
- Zebrano wood

Conservation status
- Critically Endangered (IUCN 2.3)

Scientific classification
- Kingdom: Plantae
- Clade: Tracheophytes
- Clade: Angiosperms
- Clade: Eudicots
- Clade: Rosids
- Order: Fabales
- Family: Fabaceae
- Genus: Microberlinia
- Species: M. bisulcata

Binomial name
- Microberlinia bisulcata A.Chev.

Synonyms
- Berlinia bisulcata (A.Chev.) Troupin

= Microberlinia bisulcata =

Species of legume

Microberlinia bisulcata is a lowland rainforest tree in the family Fabaceae, a species that is found only in Cameroon. It is threatened by habitat destruction and exploitation. Common names include African zebrawood, tigerwood, zebrano and zingana.

== Description ==
Microberlinia bisulcata is a tall forest tree, growing to a height of up to 40 m (130 ft) with massive buttress roots, and towering above the canopy. The lower half of the cylindrical trunk is devoid of branches. The leaves are small and the flowers are pea-like. The roots have an ectomycorrhizal association with fungi in the soil.

== Distribution and habitat ==
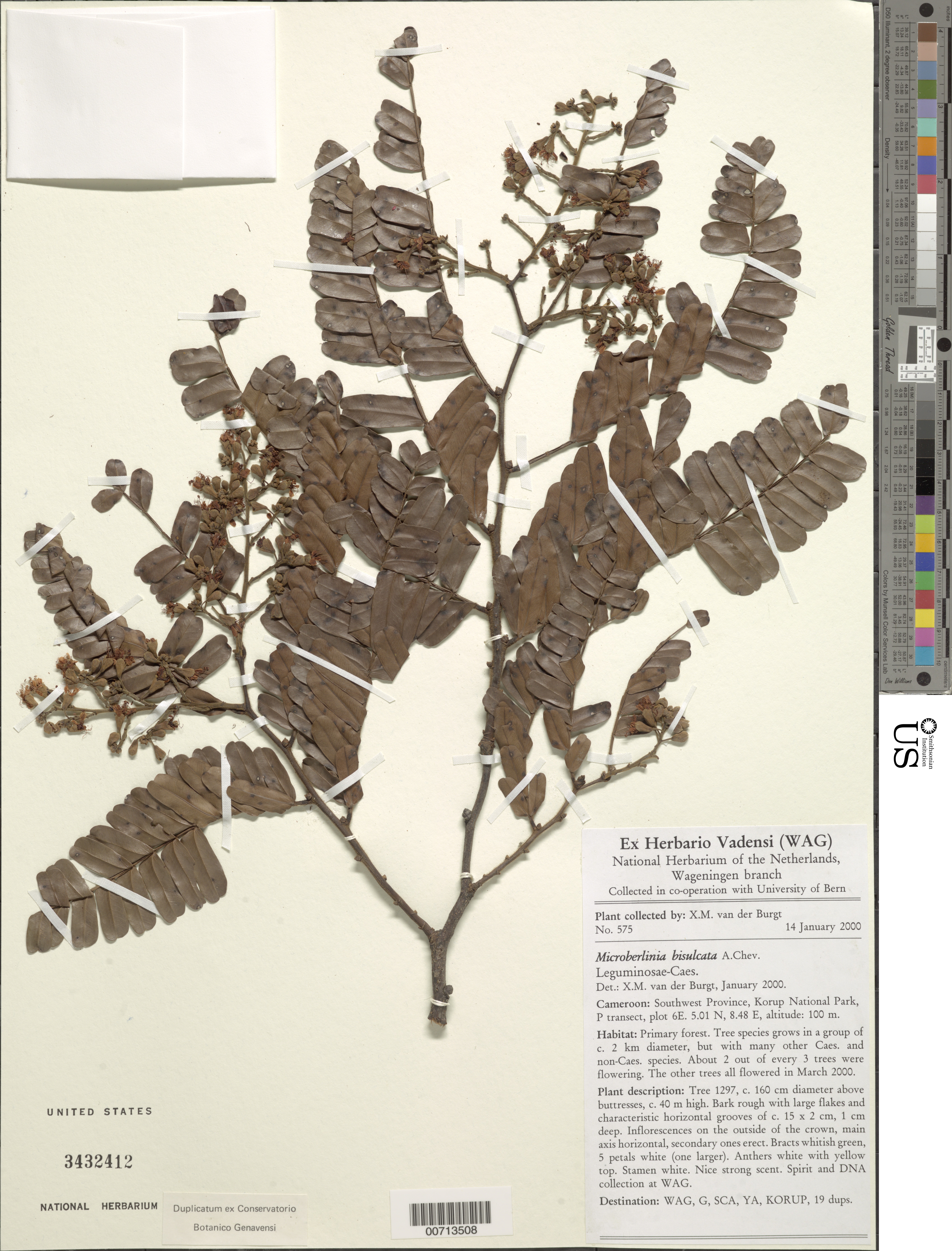
Dried Microberlinia bisulcata leaves from Korup National Park

Microberlinia bisulcata is endemic to southwestern Cameroon. It is present in Korup National Park, Loum Forest Reserve and on the northern and western foothills of Mount Cameroon. Records from elsewhere are unreliable. It occurs in lowland rainforest, typically in flat sandy areas.

== Uses ==
This tree is harvested for its valuable timber. The sapwood is 6 to 10 cm (2 to 4 in) thick and clearly demarcated from the heartwood, which is pale yellow to light tan with dark streaks. The wood texture is coarse and the grain interlocking. The wood is moderately durable and is used for turnery, furniture-making and cabinet-making; it can be used to make objects such as tool handles, panelling and veneers. It is resistant to tunneling insects and moderately resistant to termites and wood-rotting fungi.

== Status ==
Microberlinia bisulcata is selectively felled for its timber and is threatened by habitat loss, with the forest being cleared to make way for agricultural land, palm oil plantations and oil extraction. It has been extirpated from part of its range in the foothills of Mount Cameroon, and is threatened by illegal logging in the forest reserve, but should be secure in Korup National Park. Altogether, the International Union for Conservation of Nature considers the tree to be Critically Endangered. Conservation efforts include collecting seeds, establishing tree nurseries and planting saplings in selected locations.
