= Astronium lecointei =

Conservation status
- Least Concern (IUCN 3.1)

Scientific classification
- Kingdom: Plantae
- Clade: Tracheophytes
- Clade: Angiosperms
- Clade: Eudicots
- Clade: Rosids
- Order: Sapindales
- Family: Anacardiaceae
- Genus: Astronium
- Species: A. lecointei

Binomial name
- Astronium lecointei Ducke

Synonyms
- Astronium lecointei var. tomentosum (Mattick) F.A.Barkley; Astronium lecointei f. tomentosum Mattick

Species of tree

Astronium lecointei (Portuguese common name muiracatiara) is a hardwood timber tree native to Brazil. It is grouped with two other species of Astronium under the Portuguese name gonçalo alves, also known as tigerwood.
