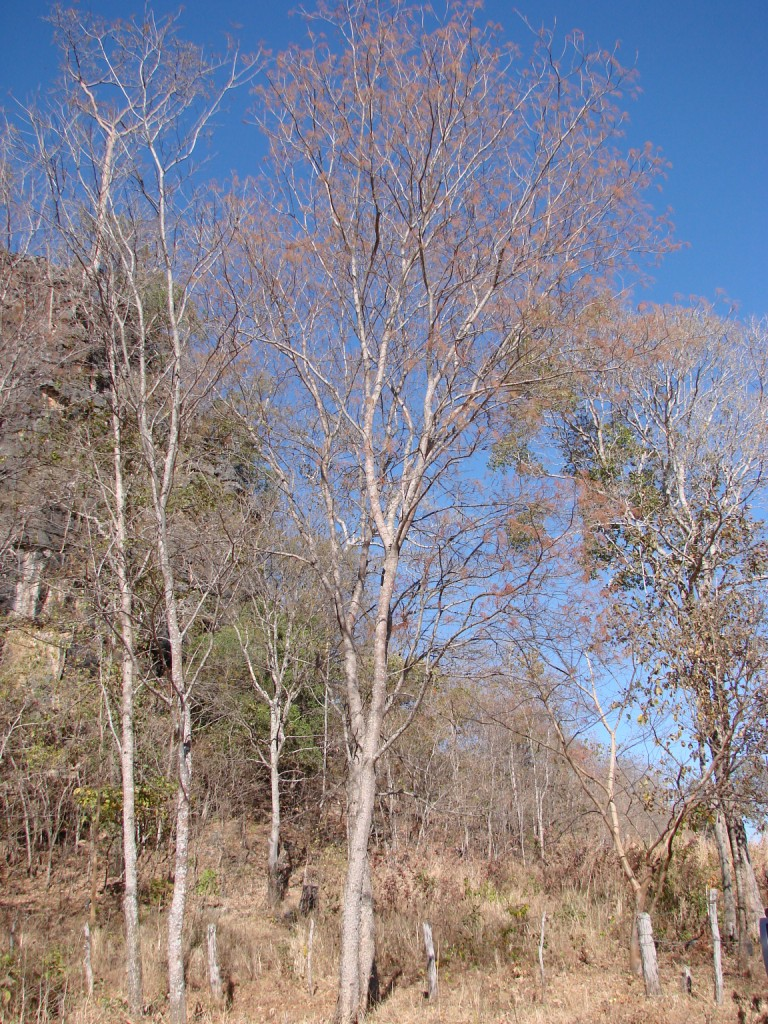

Scientific classification
- Kingdom: Plantae
- Clade: Tracheophytes
- Clade: Angiosperms
- Clade: Eudicots
- Clade: Rosids
- Order: Sapindales
- Family: Anacardiaceae
- Genus: Myracrodruon
- Species: M. urundeuva

Binomial name
- Myracrodruon urundeuva M.Allemão

= Myracrodruon urundeuva =

Species of tree

Myracrodruon urundeuva (Portuguese common names: aroeira-do-sertão, aroeira preta, urundeúva, urindeúva, arindeúva) is a timber tree, which is often used for beekeeping. This plant is native to Argentina, Brazil, Bolivia and Paraguay, and it is typical of Caatinga, Cerrado, and Pantanal vegetation in Brazil.

== Control ==
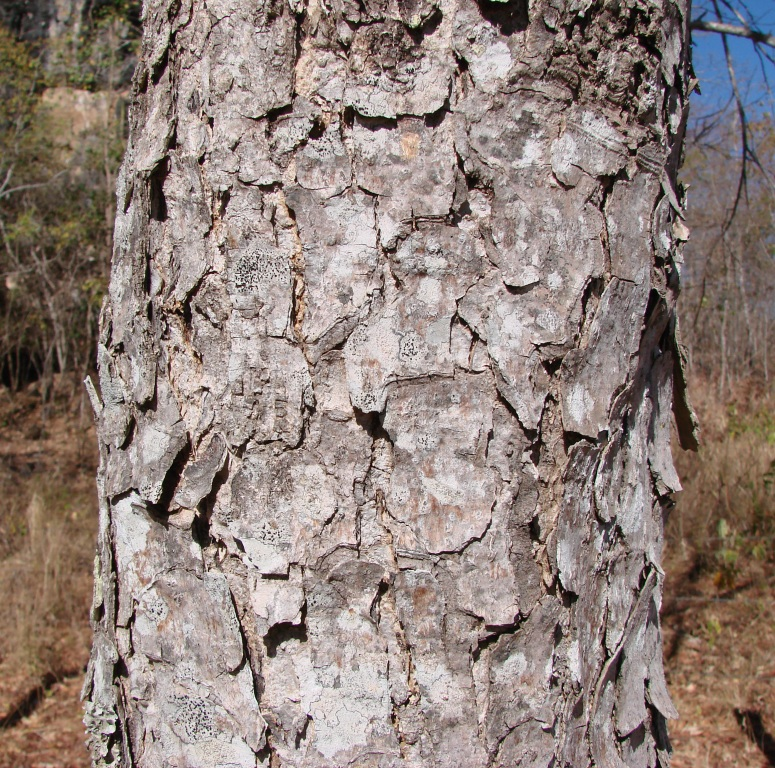
Trunk of M. urundeuva

It is reported that the plant is very susceptible to particular herbicides such as glyphosate, suggesting a restricted and proper weed management for the species.

== References and notes ==
- Pott, A.; Pott, V.J. (1994). Plantas do Pantanal. (Plants of Pantanal) (in Portuguese). EMBRAPA. ISBN 85-85007-36-2
