= Australian wormy chestnut =

Hardwood from Eucalyptus trees

Australian wormy chestnut or firestreak is a common name for lumber of Eucalyptus obliqua, Eucalyptus sieberi and Eucalyptus fastigata grown in Victoria, southern New South Wales, and Tasmania in Australia. It is a hardwood species commonly used in flooring applications.
