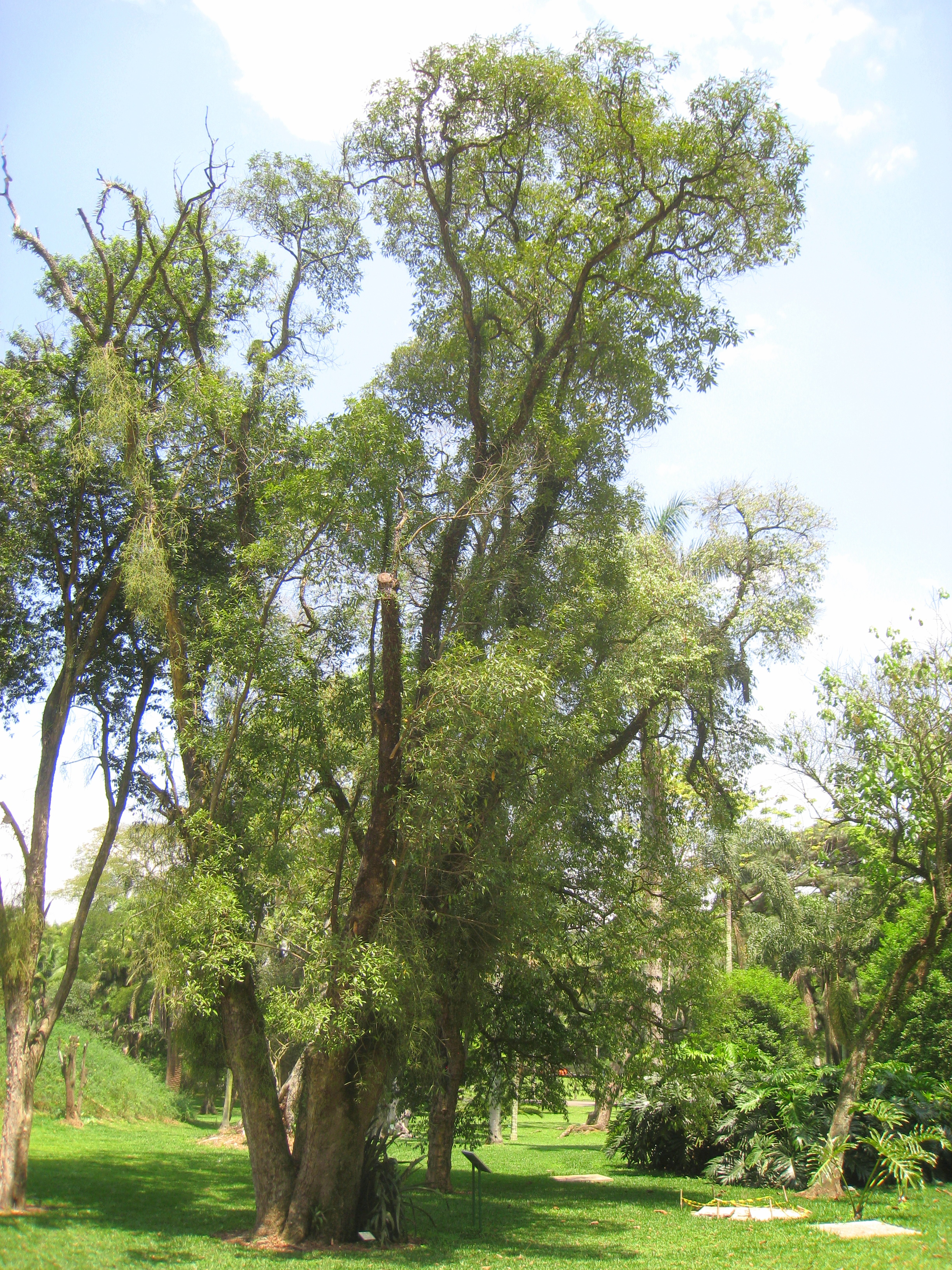

Conservation status
- Vulnerable (IUCN 2.3)

Scientific classification
- Kingdom: Plantae
- Clade: Tracheophytes
- Clade: Angiosperms
- Clade: Magnoliids
- Order: Laurales
- Family: Lauraceae
- Genus: Ocotea
- Species: O. porosa

Binomial name
- Ocotea porosa (Nees & Martius) Barroso

Synonyms
- Cinnamomum porosum (Nees & Mart.) Kosterm.; Nectandra dubia Hassl.; Nectandra speciosa Chanc.; Oreodaphne porosa Nees & Mart.; Phoebe porosa (Nees & Mart.) Mez

= Ocotea porosa =

Species of tree

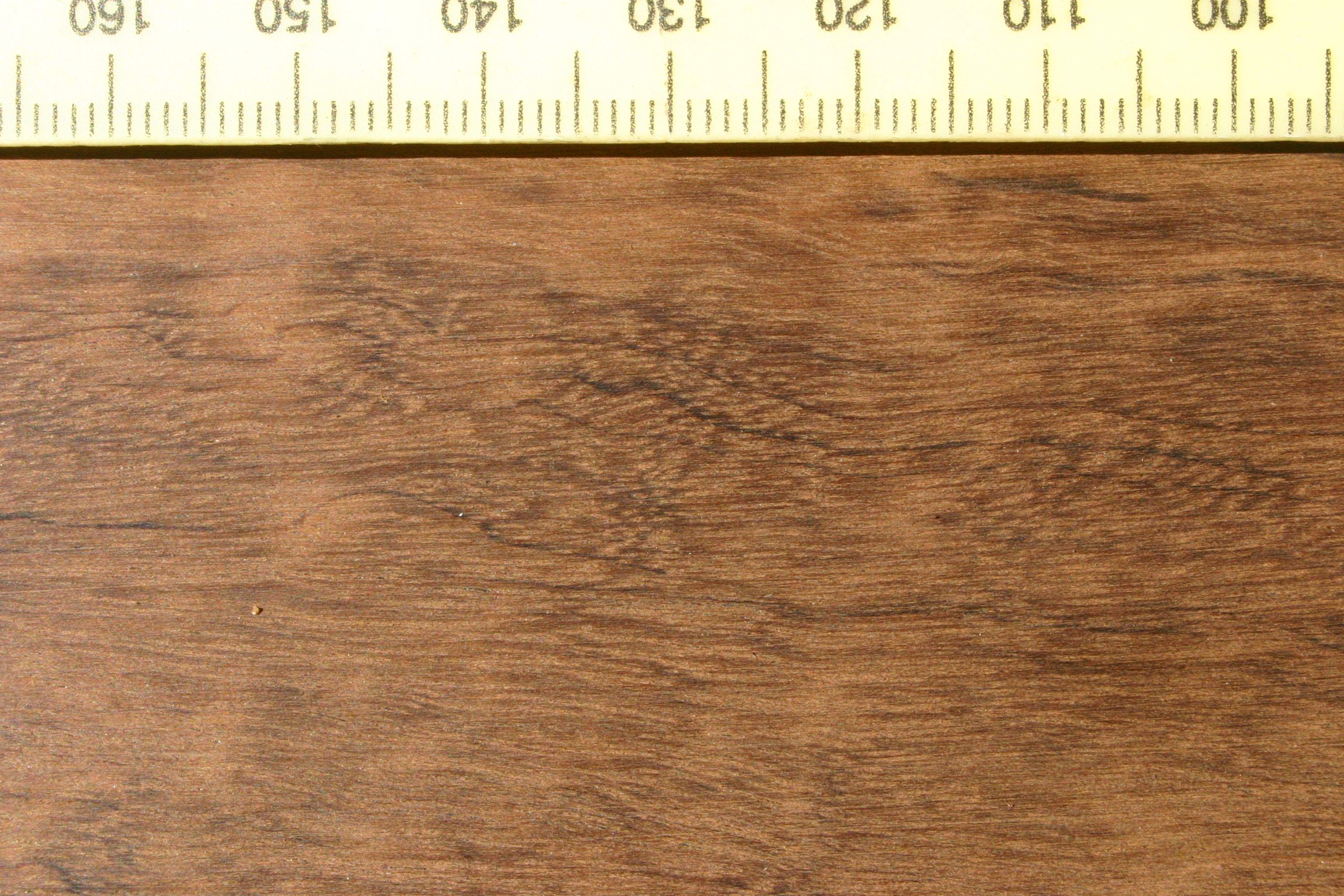

Ocotea porosa, commonly called imbuia or Brazilian walnut, is a species of plant in the Lauraceae family. Its wood is very hard, and it is a major commercial timber species in Brazil.

== Taxonomy and naming ==
It is often placed in the related genus, Phoebe. It is commonly called imbuia, and is also known as Brazilian walnut, because its wood resembles that of some walnuts (to which it is not related).

Portuguese common names (with variant spellings) include embuia, embúia, embuya, imbuia, imbúia, imbuya, canela-imbuia.

== Habitat ==
The tree grows naturally in the subtropical montane Araucaria forests of southern Brazil, mostly in the states of Paraná and Santa Catarina (where it is the official state tree since 1973), and in smaller numbers in São Paulo and Rio Grande do Sul. The species may also occur in adjacent Argentina and/or Paraguay.

In its native habitat it is a threatened species.

== Description ==
The trees typically reach 40 m (130 ft) in height and 1.8 m (5 ft 11 in) in trunk diameter.

The wood is very hard, measuring 3,684 lbf (16,390 N) on the Janka scale. The wood is also fragrant with hints of nutmeg and cinnamon (also a member of the Lauraceae).

== Uses ==
The tree is a major commercial timber species in Brazil, used for high-end furniture, mostly as decorative veneers, and as flooring.
