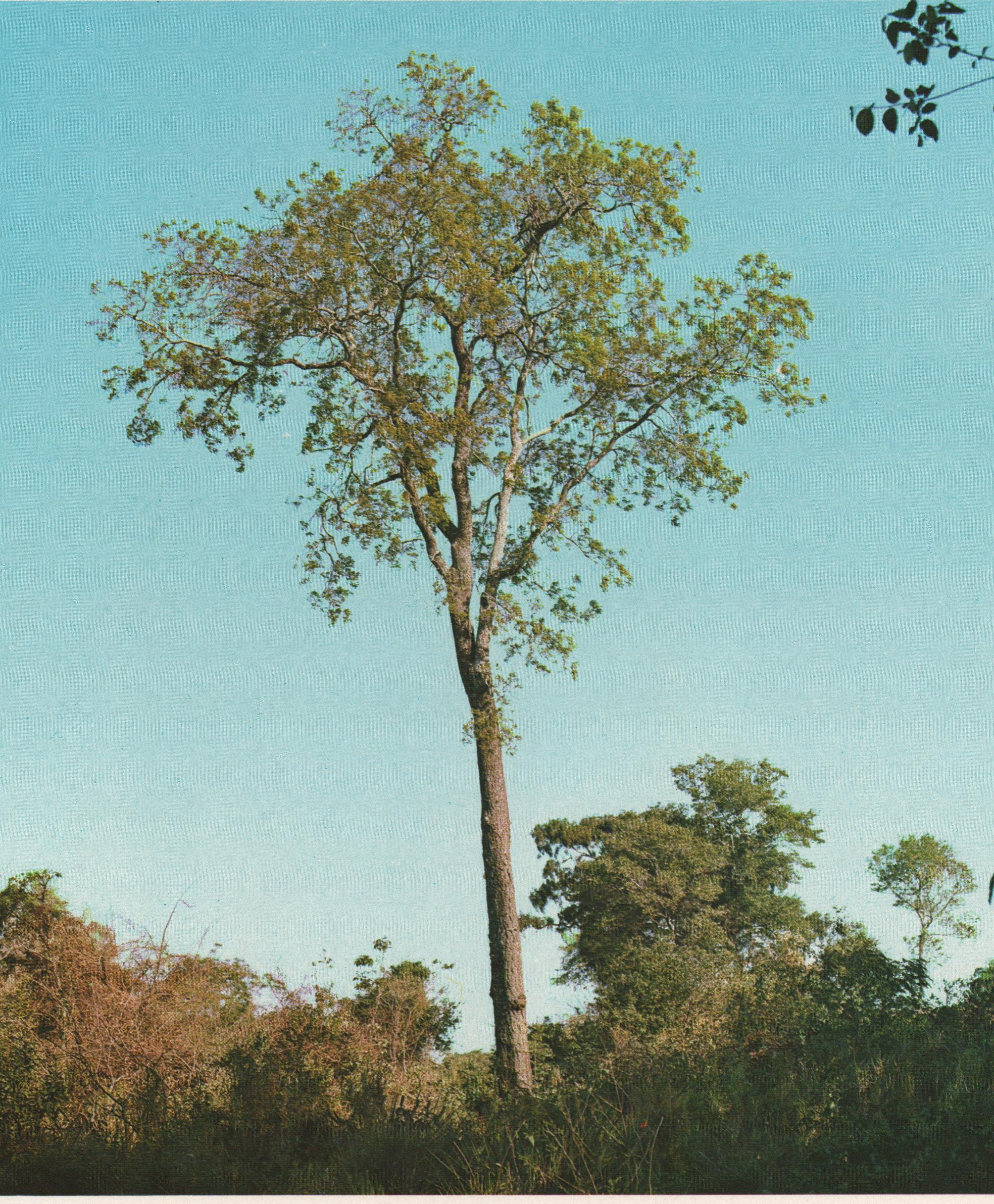

Scientific classification
- Kingdom: Plantae
- Clade: Tracheophytes
- Clade: Angiosperms
- Clade: Eudicots
- Clade: Rosids
- Order: Sapindales
- Family: Anacardiaceae
- Genus: Myracrodruon
- Species: M. balansae

Binomial name
- Myracrodruon balansae (Engl.) Santin

Synonyms
- Astronium balansae Engl.

= Myracrodruon balansae =

Species of tree

Myracrodruon balansae is a species of flowering tree in the cashew family, Anacardiaceae, that is native to Argentina, Brazil and Paraguay.
