= Gonçalo alves =

Tropical hardwood

Gonçalo alves is the name given to several species of Astronium, a tropical hardwood. It is sometimes referred to as tigerwood—a name that underscores the wood's often dramatic, contrasting color scheme, that some compare to rosewood.

== Appearance ==
While the sapwood is very light in color, the heartwood is a sombre brown, with dark streaks that give it a unique look. The wood's color deepens with exposure and age. The wood has a natural lustre in all ages and patterns.

== Species ==
Two species are usually listed as sources for gonçalo alves: Astronium fraxinifolium and Astronium graveolens, although other species in the genus, including Astronium lecointei, may yield similar wood; the amount of striping that is present may vary. All trees grow in neotropical forests; Brazil is a major exporter of these woods, and is the origin of its Portuguese name.
