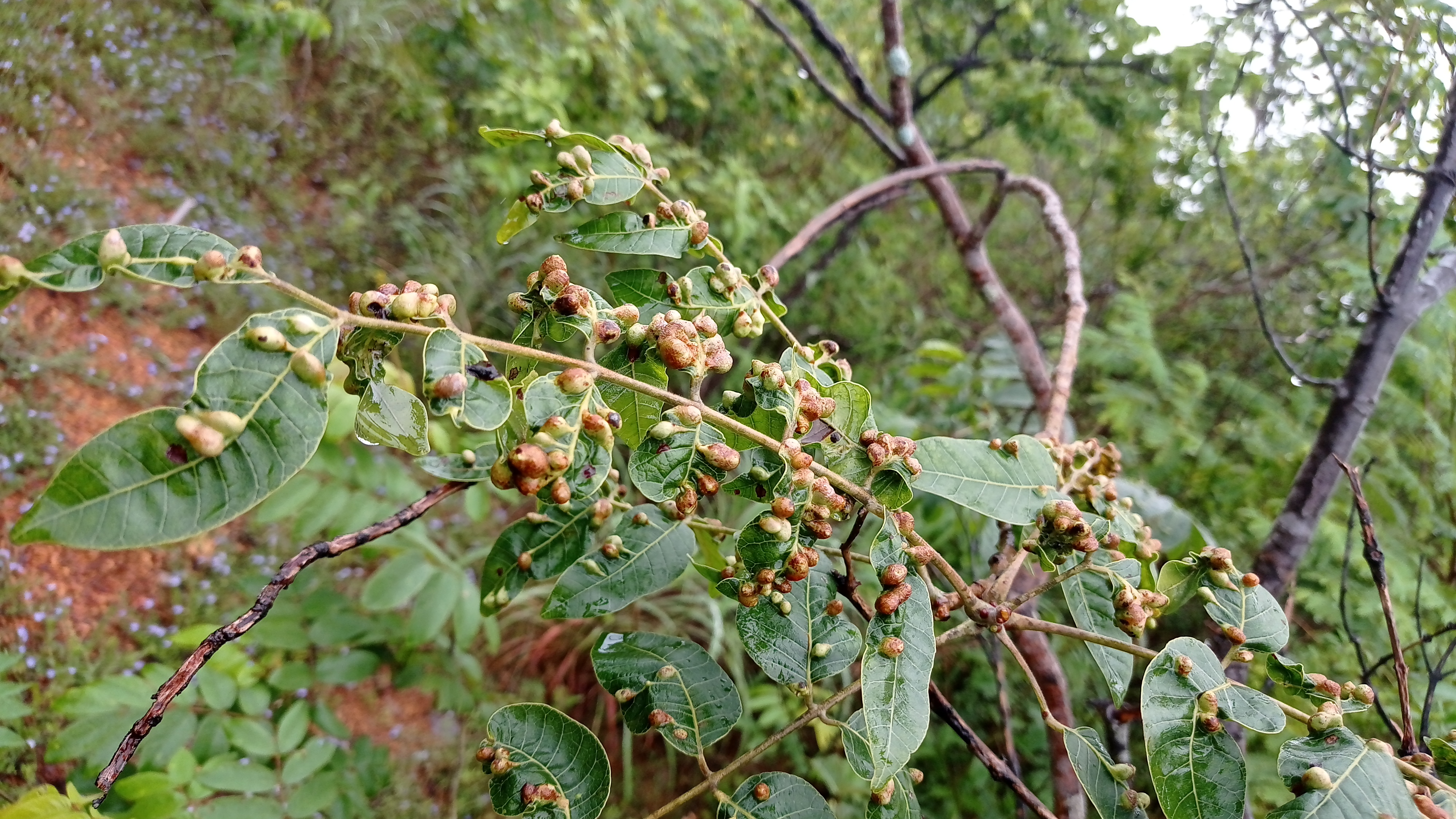

Conservation status
- Least Concern (IUCN 3.1)

Scientific classification
- Kingdom: Plantae
- Clade: Tracheophytes
- Clade: Angiosperms
- Clade: Eudicots
- Clade: Rosids
- Order: Sapindales
- Family: Anacardiaceae
- Genus: Astronium
- Species: A. fraxinifolium

Binomial name
- Astronium fraxinifolium Schott

= Astronium fraxinifolium =

Species of tree

Astronium fraxinifolium is a hardwood timber tree, which is native to Amazon rainforest, Atlantic Forest, Caatinga, and Cerrado vegetation in Brazil. Common names include kingwood, locustwood, tigerwood, and zebrawood. This plant is cited in Flora Brasiliensis by Carl Friedrich Philipp von Martius. It is grouped with two other species of Astronium under the Portuguese name gonçalo alves, also known as tigerwood.
