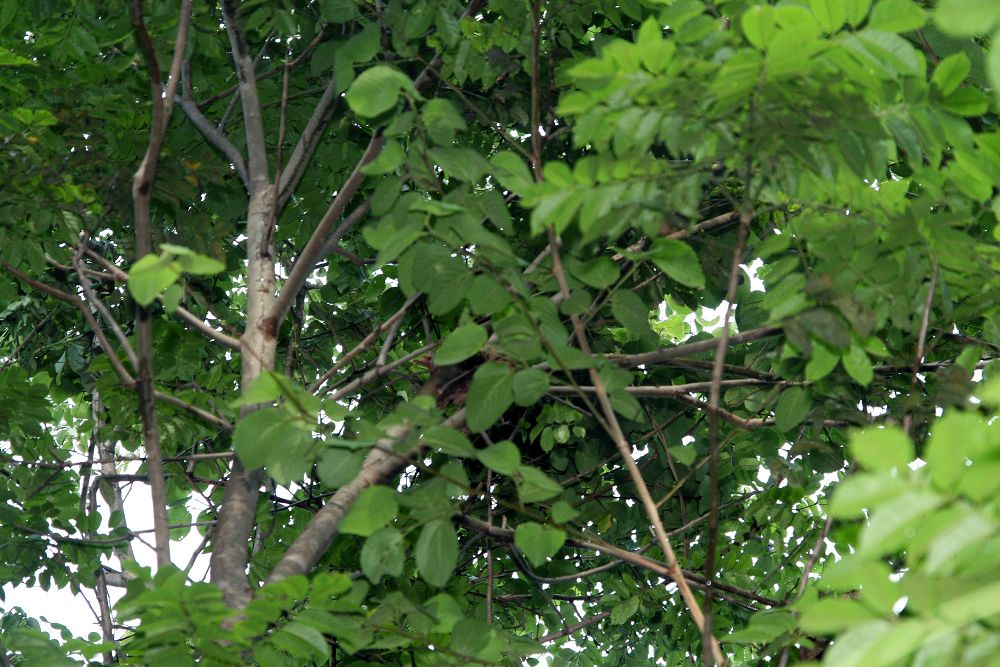

Conservation status
- Least Concern (IUCN 3.1)

Scientific classification
- Kingdom: Plantae
- Clade: Tracheophytes
- Clade: Angiosperms
- Clade: Eudicots
- Clade: Rosids
- Order: Sapindales
- Family: Anacardiaceae
- Genus: Astronium
- Species: A. graveolens

Binomial name
- Astronium graveolens Jacq.

Synonyms
- Astronium conzattii S.F.Blake; Astronium gracile Engl.; Astronium planchonianum Engl.; Astronium zongolicum Reko nom. illeg.

= Astronium graveolens =

Species of tree

Astronium graveolens is a species of hardwood tree in the cashew family, Anacardiaceae, that is native to Mexico, Central America, and South America as far south as Bolivia. Common names include glassywood, tigerwood, ronrón (Spanish), aroeira (Portuguese), and gonçalo alves (Portuguese), where it is grouped with two other species of Astronium.

This plant is cited in Flora Brasiliensis by Carl Friedrich Philipp von Martius.

== Description ==
Astronium graveolens grows to a height of 35 metres (100 ft). The trunk can have a diameter of up to 1 metre (39 in) and is straight and cylindrical. At the base it has buttresses which may be about 2 metres (7 ft) tall. The crown is rounded with irregular branches. The bark is grey, shiny and smooth, with paler patches where pieces have peeled off. The leaves are alternate and pinnate, with five to seven oblong or obovate leaflets with pointed tips. The tree flowers during the dry season. The flowers are hermaphrodite, small, yellowish-green in axillary or terminal panicles. The fruit is a drupe-like nut, blue ripening to black, with semi bitter flesh and a single seed. This plant is also called "gateado", according to Webster's Third New International Dictionary

== Timber ==
When fresh, the heartwood of Astronium graveolens is reddish-brown or orange-brown with variable width stripes of medium to dark brown. The timber becomes darker after exposure to the air and the stripes become nearly black. The sapwood is up to 10 centimetres (4 in) thick and is whitish or dull grey. The timber is fine-grained, dense and durable, and resistant to rot. It is used for heavy duty construction work, joinery, veneers and furniture. Speciality uses include turnery, carving, knife handles, brush backs, bows for archery and billiard cues.
