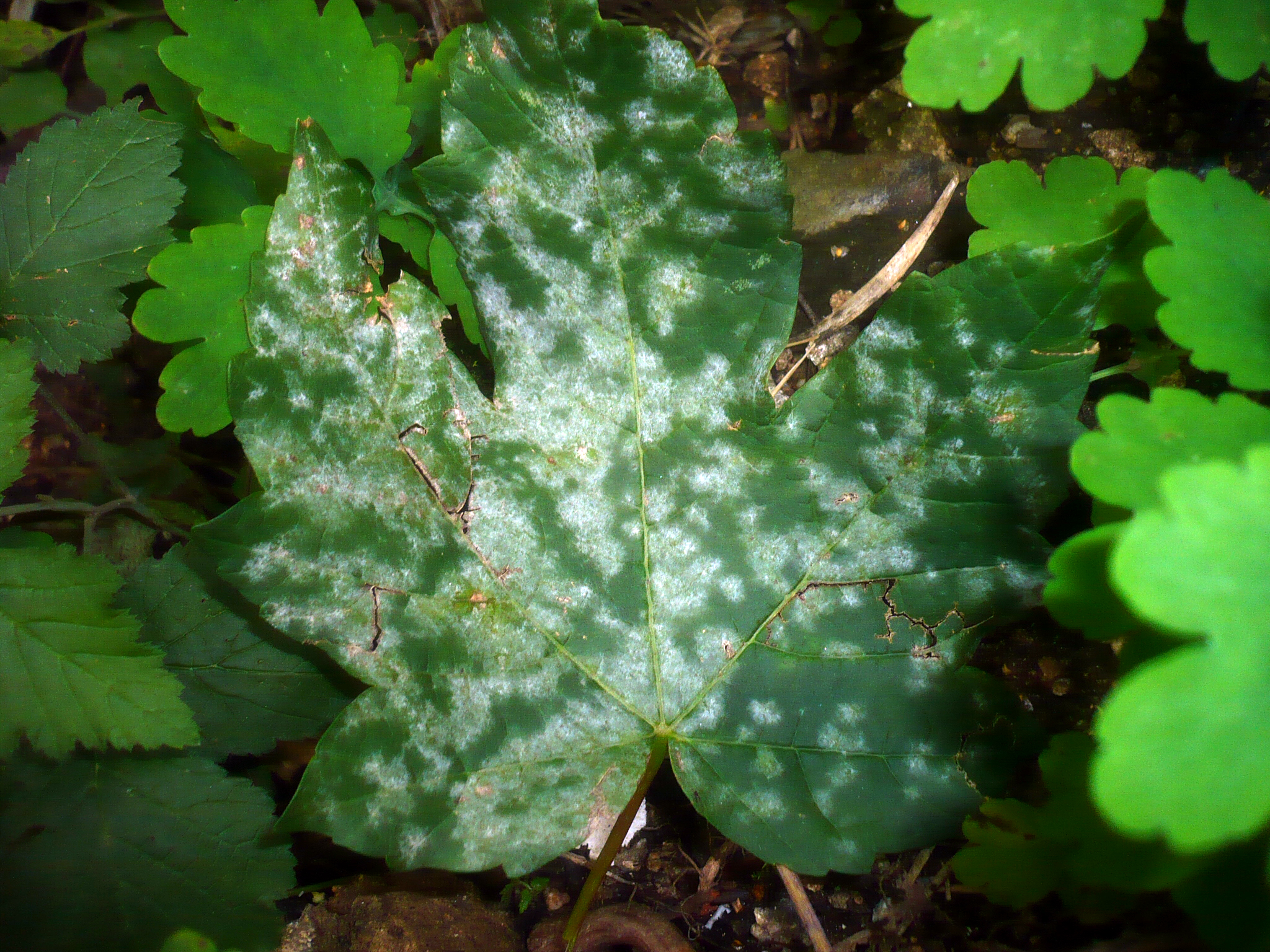
- Sawadaea bicornis on Acer pseudoplatanus

Scientific classification
- Kingdom: Fungi
- Division: Ascomycota
- Class: Leotiomycetes
- Order: Helotiales
- Family: Erysiphaceae
- Genus: Sawadaea
- Species: S. bicornis

Binomial name
- Sawadaea bicornis (Wallr.) Homma, 1937

Synonyms
- Erysiphe bicornis Link, 1824; Uncinula bicornis (Link) Lév., 1851; Alphitomorpha bicornis Wallr., 1819; Erysiphe aceris DC., 1806; Oidium aceris Rabenh., 1854; Alphitomorpha acerum Wallr., 1819; Oidium dodonaeae Reichert & Volcani, 1946

= Sawadaea bicornis =

Species of fungus

Sawadaea bicornis is a species of powdery mildew in the family Erysiphaceae. It is found across the world, where it affects maples (genus Acer).

== Description ==
The fungus forms thin, white irregular patches on the leaves of its host. Sawadaea bicornis affects many species in the genus Acer, including Acer macrophyllum, A. campestre, A. pseudoplatanus, A. negundo, A. grandidentatum, A. tataricum, A. circinatum, A. saccharinum, and A. platanoides. Some of these species can also be affected by Sawadaea tulasnei so care should be taken to distinguish the two.

== Taxonomy ==
The fungus has two different formae. S. bicornis f. bicornis affects Acer campestre and A. planatoides. S. bicornis f. polyphaga is a more virulent form that has evolved to infect a much larger range of host species and is introduced across the world.
