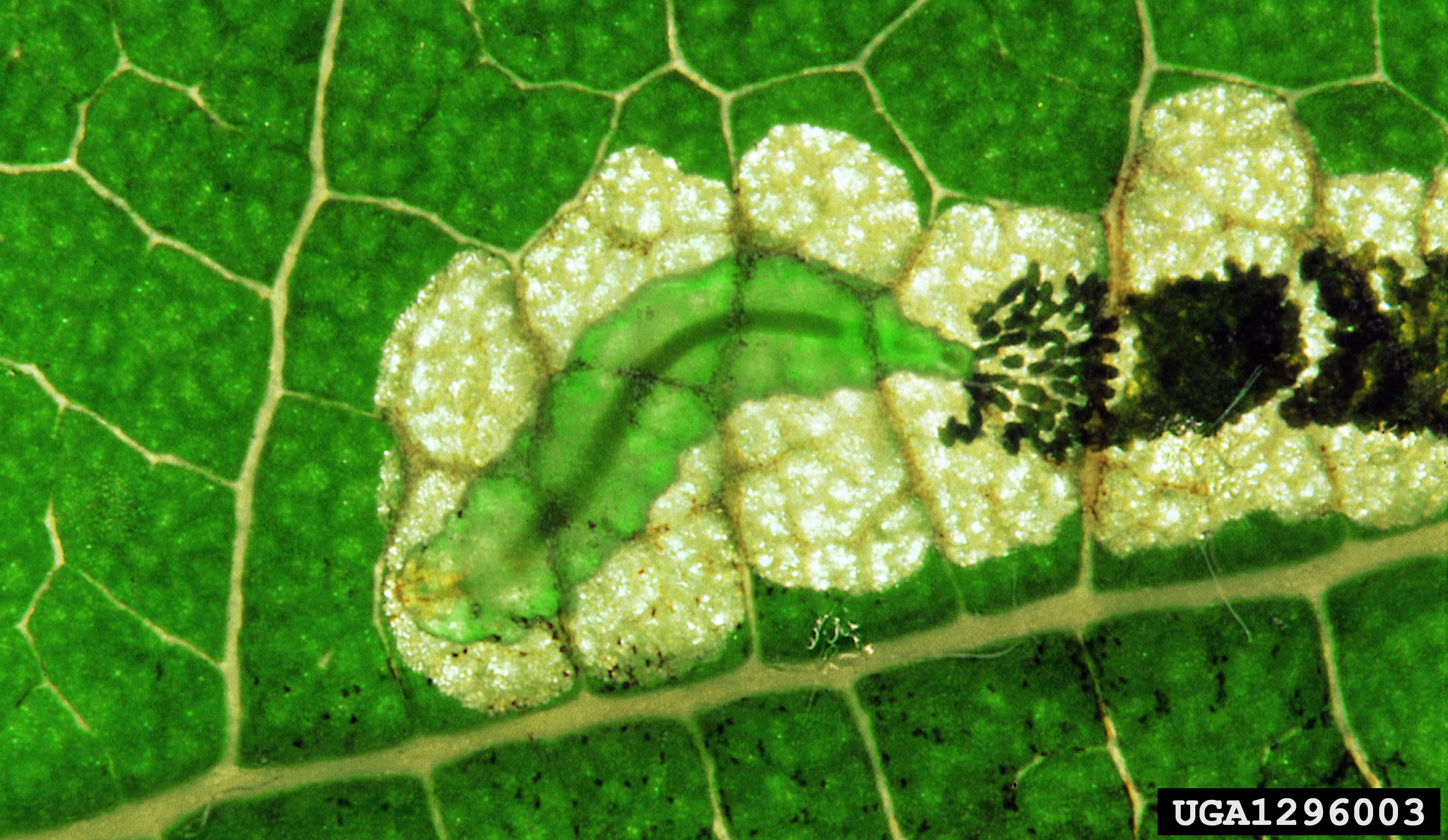
- Mine

Scientific classification
- Kingdom: Animalia
- Phylum: Arthropoda
- Class: Insecta
- Order: Lepidoptera
- Family: Nepticulidae
- Genus: Stigmella
- Species: S. aceris

Binomial name
- Stigmella aceris (Frey, 1857)

Synonyms
- Nepticula aceris Frey, 1857; Nepticula penicillata Heinemann & Wocke, 1877; Nepticula szocsi Klimesch, 1956

= Stigmella aceris =

Species of moth

Stigmella aceris is a moth of the family Nepticulidae found in Europe. It was first described by Heinrich Frey in 1857.

The moth flies from May to June and again in August depending on the location and has a wingspan of 3.7–4.7 mm.

Larvae mine the leaves of its food plant making a narrow corridor usually filling the entire width of the corridor with frass. Eggs are laid on field maple (Acer campestre), Amur maple (A. ginnala), Norway maple (A. platanoides) and Tatarian maple (A. tataricum). There is some debate as to whether the moth mines the leaves of sycamore (A. pseudoplatanus) with Plant Parasites of Europe stating that it is never found on sycamore and UKmoths stating it is found on sycamore.
