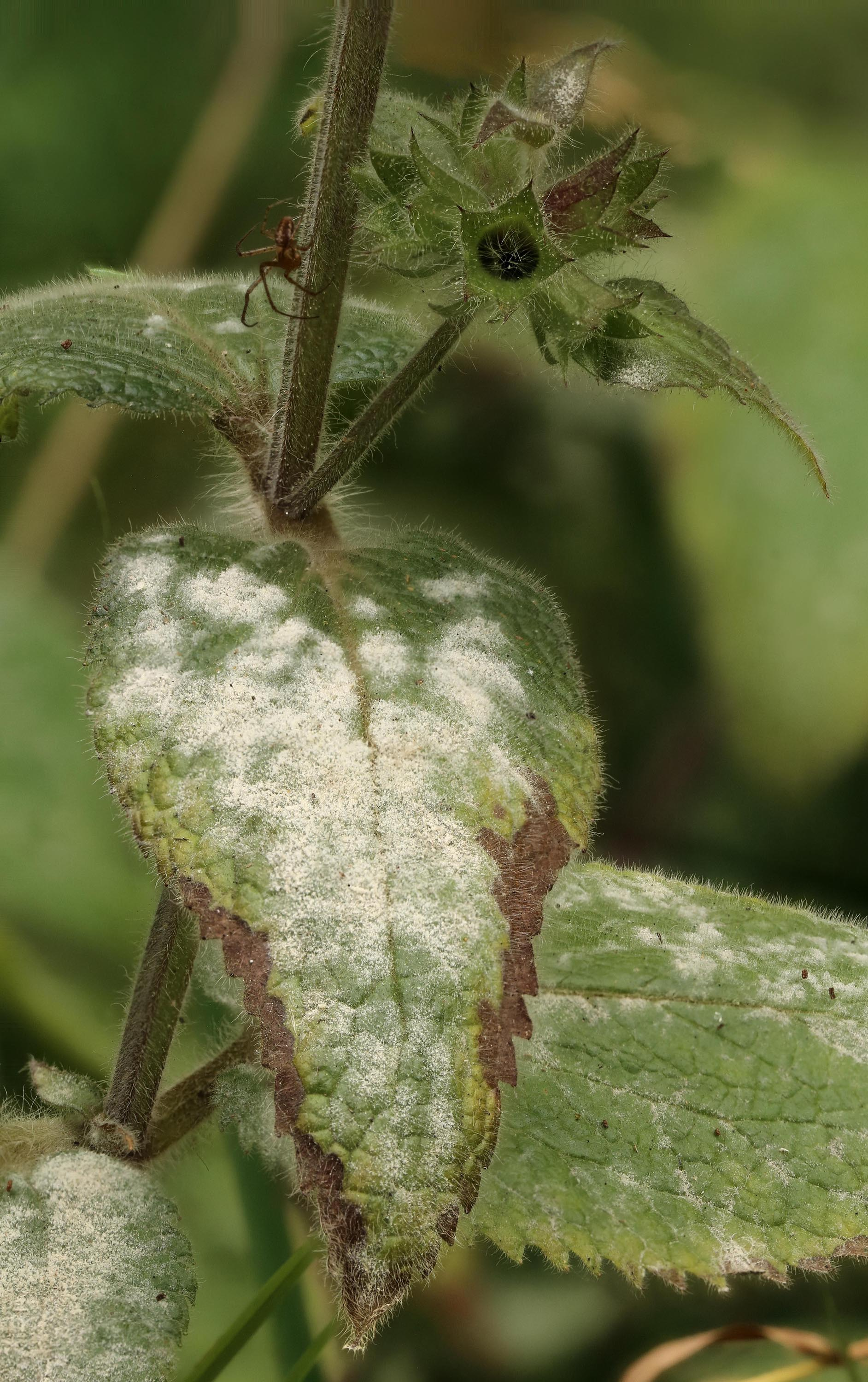

Scientific classification
- Kingdom: Fungi
- Division: Ascomycota
- Class: Leotiomycetes
- Order: Helotiales
- Family: Erysiphaceae
- Genus: Neoerysiphe
- Species: N. galeopsidis

Binomial name
- Neoerysiphe galeopsidis (DC.) U. Braun, 1999

Synonyms
- Erysiphe galeopsidis DC., 1815; Golovinomyces galeopsidis (DC.) V.P. Heluta, 1988; Oidium leonuri-sibirici Sawada, 1927; Oidium leucas-javanicae Sawada, 1927; Alphitomorpha ballotae Wallr., 1819; Oidium lamii Rabenh., 1853; Erysiphe labiatarum Jacz., 1957; Erysiphe lamprocarpa var. ballotes Link, 1824; Alphitomorpha labiatarum Wallr., 1819; Erysiphe labiatarum (Wallr.) Chevall., 1826; Erysiphe matheranensis T.S. Viswan., 1958; Erysiphe communis var. labiatarum (Wallr.) Link, 1824

= Neoerysiphe galeopsidis =

Species of fungus

Neoerysiphe galeopsidis is a species of powdery mildews in the family Erysiphaceae. It is found across Eurasia and North America, and has also been introduced to Australia, where it affects a large variety of different hosts in multiple plant families including the Acanthaceae and Lamiaceae. Unusually, it also occurs on Catalpa. Neoerysiphe galeopsidis sensu stricto occurs on multiple genera including Galeopsis and Lamium.

== Description ==
The fungus forms dense, white fuzzy patches on the leaves of its host. Neoerysiphe galeopsidis infects many genera, including commonly cultivated plants such as Acanthus, Catalpa and Stachys. Infections on some plants, such as lamb's-ear, can be less easy to spot.

== Taxonomy ==
The fungus was formally described in 1815 by De Candolle with the basionym Erysiphe galeopsidis. The species was transferred to the genus Neoerysiphe by Uwe Braun in 1999. Bradshaw et al. (2022) recovered three clear clades within Neoerysiphe galeopsidis, with moderate to high support: a "true" clade on Lamium, Galeopsis, etc.; a European Stachys-infecting clade; and an American Stachys-infecting clade.
