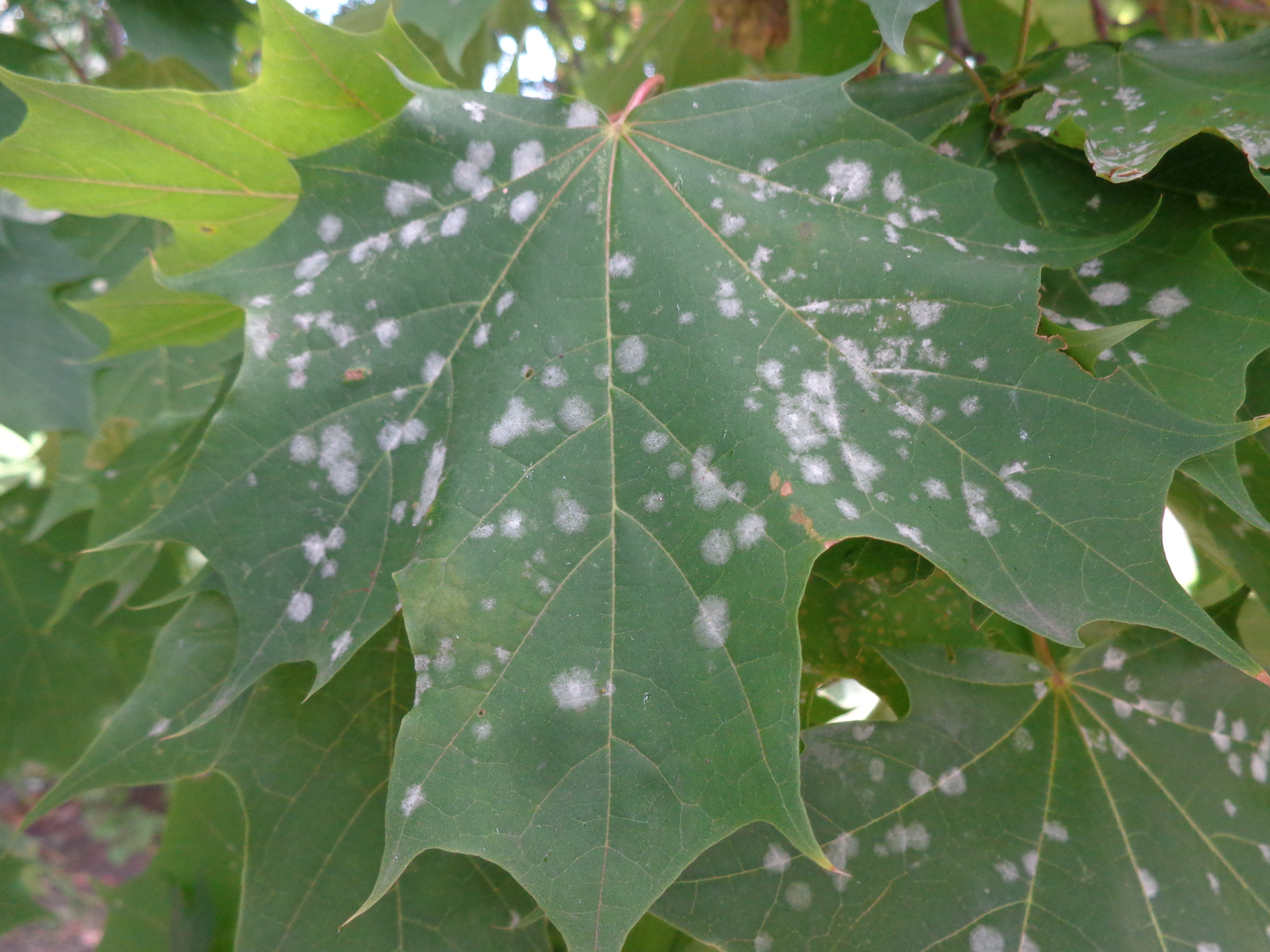

Scientific classification
- Kingdom: Fungi
- Division: Ascomycota
- Class: Leotiomycetes
- Order: Helotiales
- Family: Erysiphaceae
- Genus: Sawadaea
- Species: S. tulasnei

Binomial name
- Sawadaea tulasnei (Fuckel) Homma, 1937

Synonyms
- Uncinula tulasnei Fuckel, 1866; Uncinula aceris var. tulasnei (Fuckel) E.S. Salmon, 1900; Uncinula bicornis var. tulasnei (Fuckel) W.B. Cooke, 1952

= Sawadaea tulasnei =

Species of fungus

Sawadaea tulasnei is a species of powdery mildew in the family Erysiphaceae. It is found in Eurasia and North America, where it affects maples (genus Acer).

== Description ==
The fungus forms dense, white sharp-edged patches on the leaves of its host. Sawadaea tulasnei affects multiple species in the genus Acer, but some hosts include Acer platanoides, A. macrophyllum, and A. tataricum. Some of these species can also be affected by other Sawadaea species.

== Taxonomy ==
The species was first described by Fuckel in 1866 with the basionym Uncinula tulasnei. The species was transferred to the genus Sawadaea (named after the Japanese mycologist Sawada) by Homma in 1937.
