= Pleochaeta =

Scientific classification
- Kingdom: Fungi
- Division: Ascomycota
- Class: Leotiomycetes
- Order: Helotiales
- Family: Erysiphaceae
- Genus: Pleochaeta; Sacc. & Speg. (1881)

Type species
- Pleochaeta lynchii (Speg.) Speg. (1883)

Genus of fungi

Pleochaeta is a genus of fungi in the family Erysiphaceae.

== Species ==
- Pleochaeta indica
- Pleochaeta lynchii
- Pleochaeta mali
- Pleochaeta polychaeta
- Pleochaeta populicola
- Pleochaeta prosopidis
- Pleochaeta salicicola
- Pleochaeta shiraiana
