= Ferroglobulin =

Protein

Ferroglobulin is a protein in whey.

The presence of ferroglobulin in milk is perhaps the explanation for the ability of this product to treat powdery mildew in the garden. Milk is diluted with water (typically 1:10) and sprayed on susceptible plants at the first sign of infection, or as a preventative measure, with repeated weekly application often controlling or eliminating the disease. Ferroglobulin produces oxygen radicals when exposed to sunlight, and contact with these radicals is damaging to the fungus.
