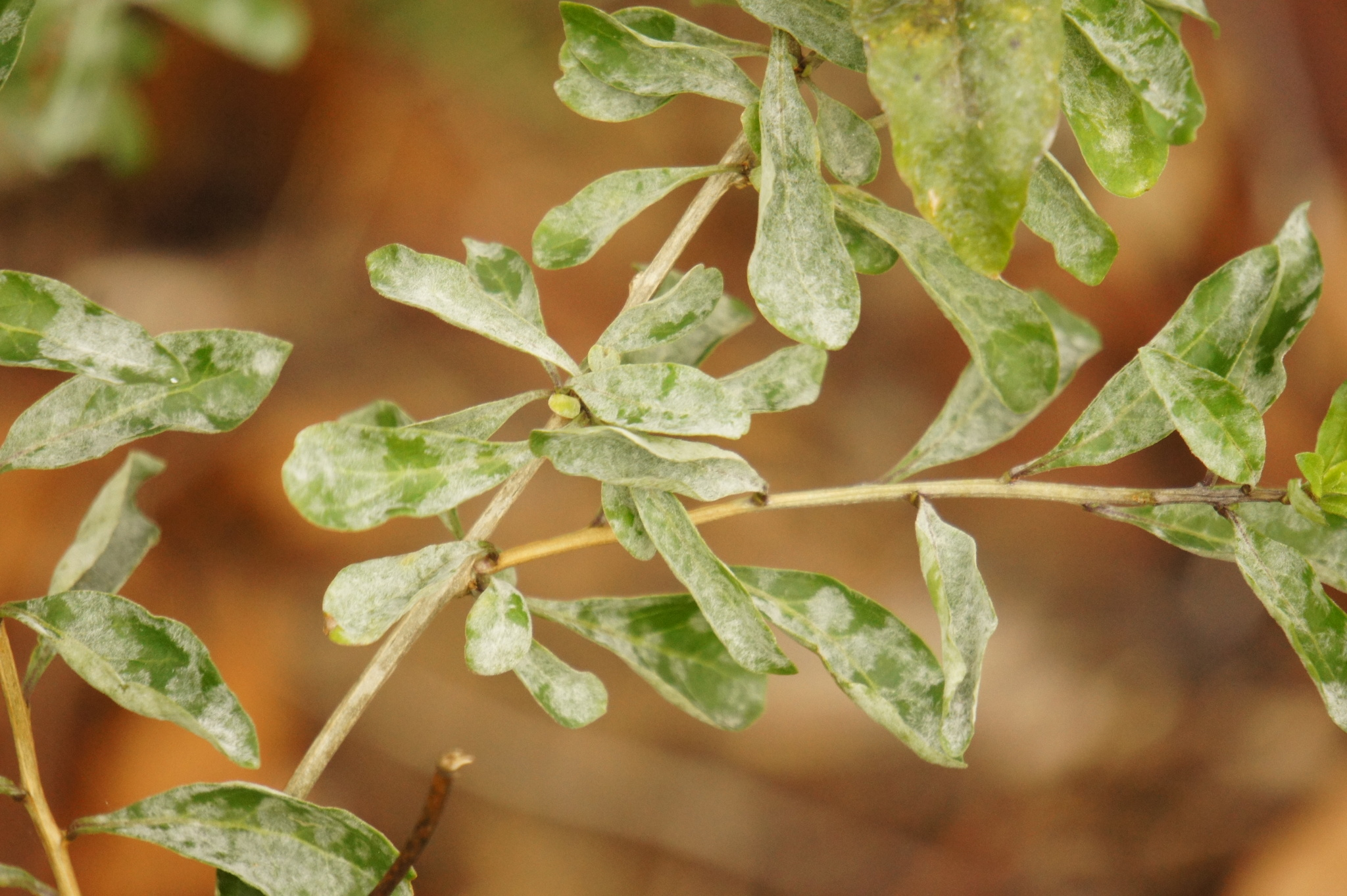
- Arthrocladiella mougeotii on Lycium depressum in the UK.

Scientific classification
- Kingdom: Fungi
- Division: Ascomycota
- Class: Leotiomycetes
- Order: Helotiales
- Family: Erysiphaceae
- Genus: Arthrocladiella; Vassilkov, 1960
- Species: A. mougeotii

Binomial name
- Arthrocladiella mougeotii (Lév.) Vassilkov, 1963

Synonyms
- Microsphaera mougeotii Lév., 1851; Calocladia mougeotii Lév., 1851; Erysiphe mougeotii (Lév.) de Bary, 1870; Podosphaera mougeotii (Lév.) Quél., 1875; Erysiphe lycii Lasch, 1846; Microsphaera lycii (Lasch) Sacc. & Roum., 1881; Arthrocladia lycii (Lasch) Golovin, 1956; Arthrocladiella lycii (Lasch) Vassilkov, 1960

= Arthrocladiella =

Monotypic genus of fungi

Arthrocladiella is a genus of fungi in the family Erysiphaceae. The monotypic genus contains the single species Arthrocladiella mougeotii, which forms powdery mildew on leaves of plants in the genus Lycium.

== Description ==
The fungus forms white irregular patches of mycelium on the leaves of its host. Like most powdery mildew species, Arthrocladiella mougeotii is highly host-specific and only infects a few species in the genus Lycium. This species is found across the world, in any habitats where its host species occur. The type specimen was collected in France on Lycium europaeum. This species has also been recorded from Lycium barbarum, cestroides, chinense, dasystemum, depressum, and ruthenicum. Phyllactinia chubutiana occurs on the same hosts in some parts of the world, and sometimes occurs together with Arthrocladiella mougeotii on the same plants.

== Taxonomy ==
The fungus was formally described in 1851 by Léveillé with the basionym Calocladia mougeotii. The species was transferred to the genus Erysiphe in 1870 but was for some time known under the name Erysiphe lycii, a nomen nudum from 1846. The monotypic genus Arthrocladia was introduced in 1956 for this species but published invalidly. The current combination of Arthrocladiella mougeotii was published in 1963 by Vassilkov.
