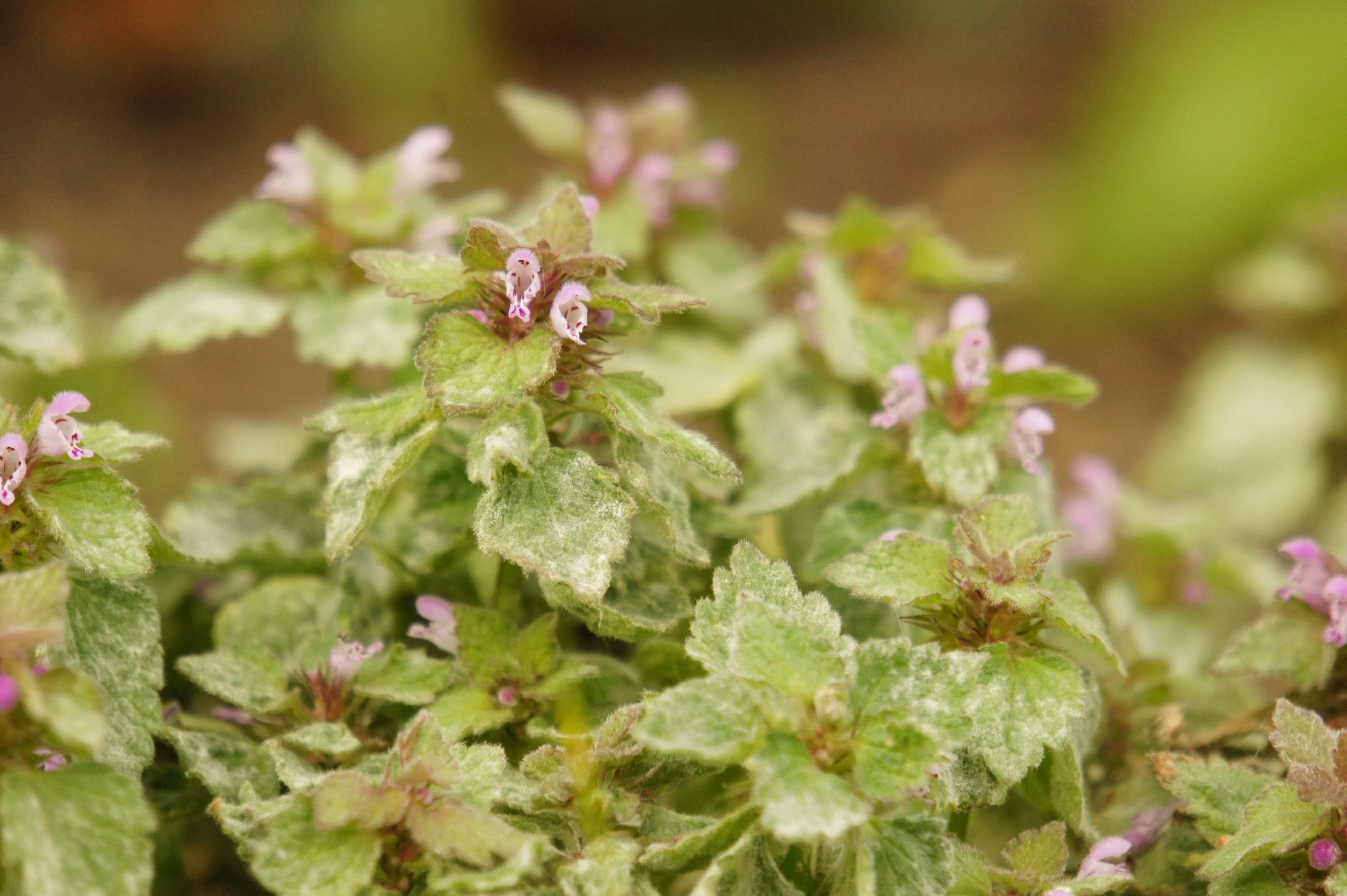
- Neoerysiphe galeopsidis on Lamium purpureum

Scientific classification
- Kingdom: Fungi
- Division: Ascomycota
- Class: Leotiomycetes
- Order: Helotiales
- Family: Erysiphaceae
- Genus: Neoerysiphe; U. Braun, 1999

Type species
- Neoerysiphe galeopsidis (DC.) U. Braun, 1999

= Neoerysiphe =

Genus of fungi

Neoerysiphe is a genus of plant pathogenic fungi in the family Erysiphaceae, the powdery mildews. Members of the genus can be found on all continents except Antarctica, and infect a range of different genera.

== Species ==
- Neoerysiphe galeopsidis (DC.) U. Braun, 1999
