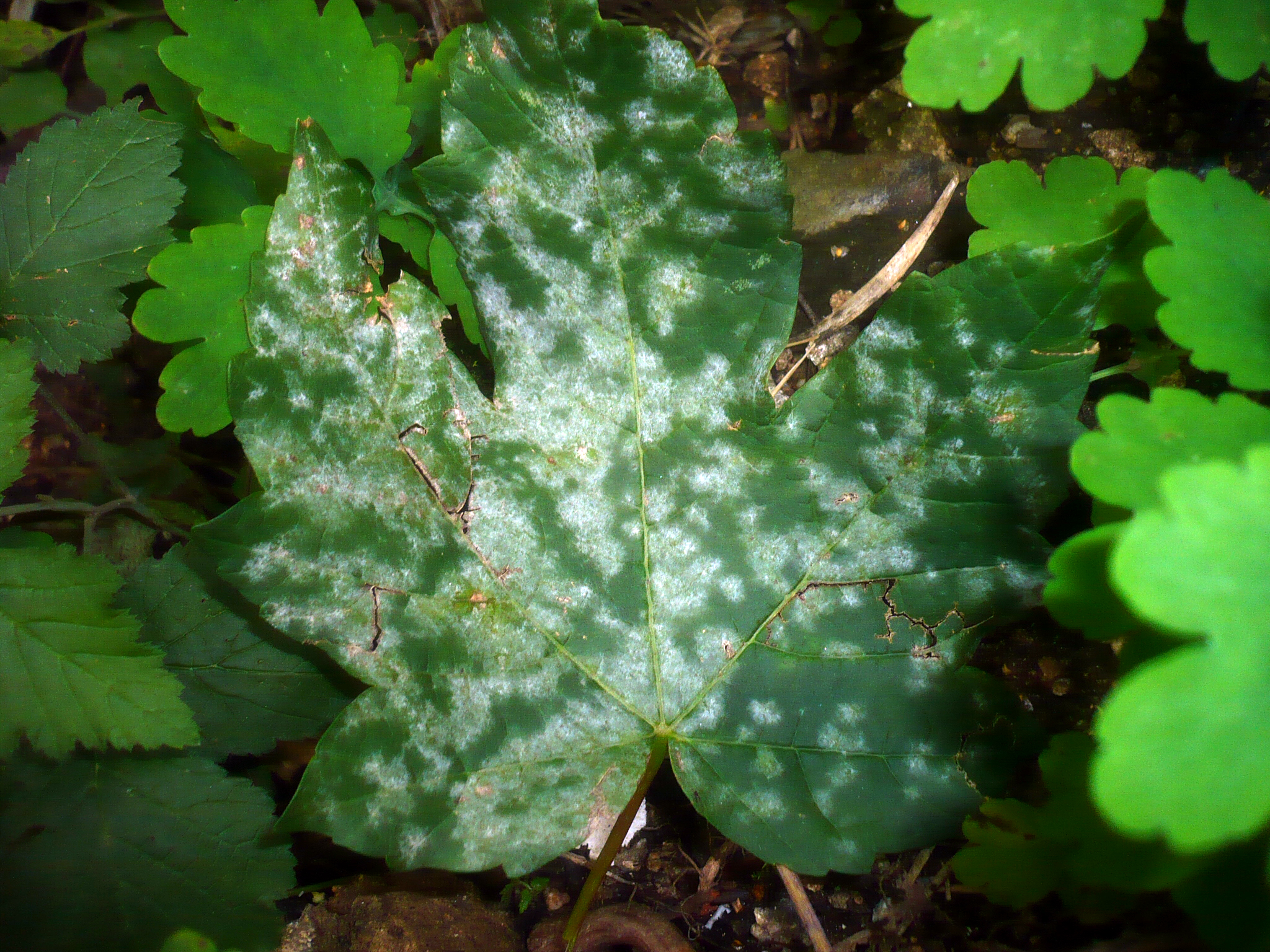
- Sawadaea bicornis growing on a species of maple.

Scientific classification
- Kingdom: Fungi
- Division: Ascomycota
- Class: Leotiomycetes
- Order: Helotiales
- Family: Erysiphaceae
- Genus: Sawadaea; Miyabe, 1914

Type species
- Sawadaea aceris (DC.) Miyabe, 1914

= Sawadaea =

Genus of fungi

Sawadaea is a genus of fungi in the family Erysiphaceae (powdery mildews). It contains twelve species.

== Description ==
The fungus forms white patches of mycelium on the leaves of its host. Some Sawadaea species have a 'spring' and 'autumn' phase. In spring, the mycelium appears on the upperside of leaves. In autumn, it can be found on the undersides.

== Taxonomy ==
The genus was initially circumscribed by Kingo Miyabe in 1914. The genus name of Sawadaea is in honour of Kaneyoshi (Kenkichi) Sawada (1888–1950), who was a Japanese botanist and mycologist. He worked at the College of Agriculture in the National Taiwan University.

== Species ==
As of Feng et al. (2025):

- Sawadaea acerina G.X. Guan & S.Y. Liu, 2025
- Sawadaea aceris-arguti S. Takam. & U. Braun, 2025
- Sawadaea aesculi R.Y. Zheng & G.Q. Chen, 1980
- Sawadaea bicornis (Wallr.) Homma, 1937
- Sawadaea bifida V.P. Heluta, 1990
- Sawadaea bomiensis R.Y. Zheng & G.Q. Chen, 1980
- Sawadaea koelreuteriae (I. Miyake) H.D. Shin & M.J. Park, 2011
- Sawadaea kovaliana V.P. Heluta, 1990
- Sawadaea nankinensis (F.L. Tai) S. Takam. & U. Braun, 2008
- Sawadaea negundinis Homma, 1937
- Sawadaea polyfida (C.T. Wei) R.Y. Zheng & G.Q. Chen, 1980
- Sawadaea taii G.X. Guan & S.Y. Liu, 2025
- Sawadaea tulasnei (Fuckel) Homma, 1937
