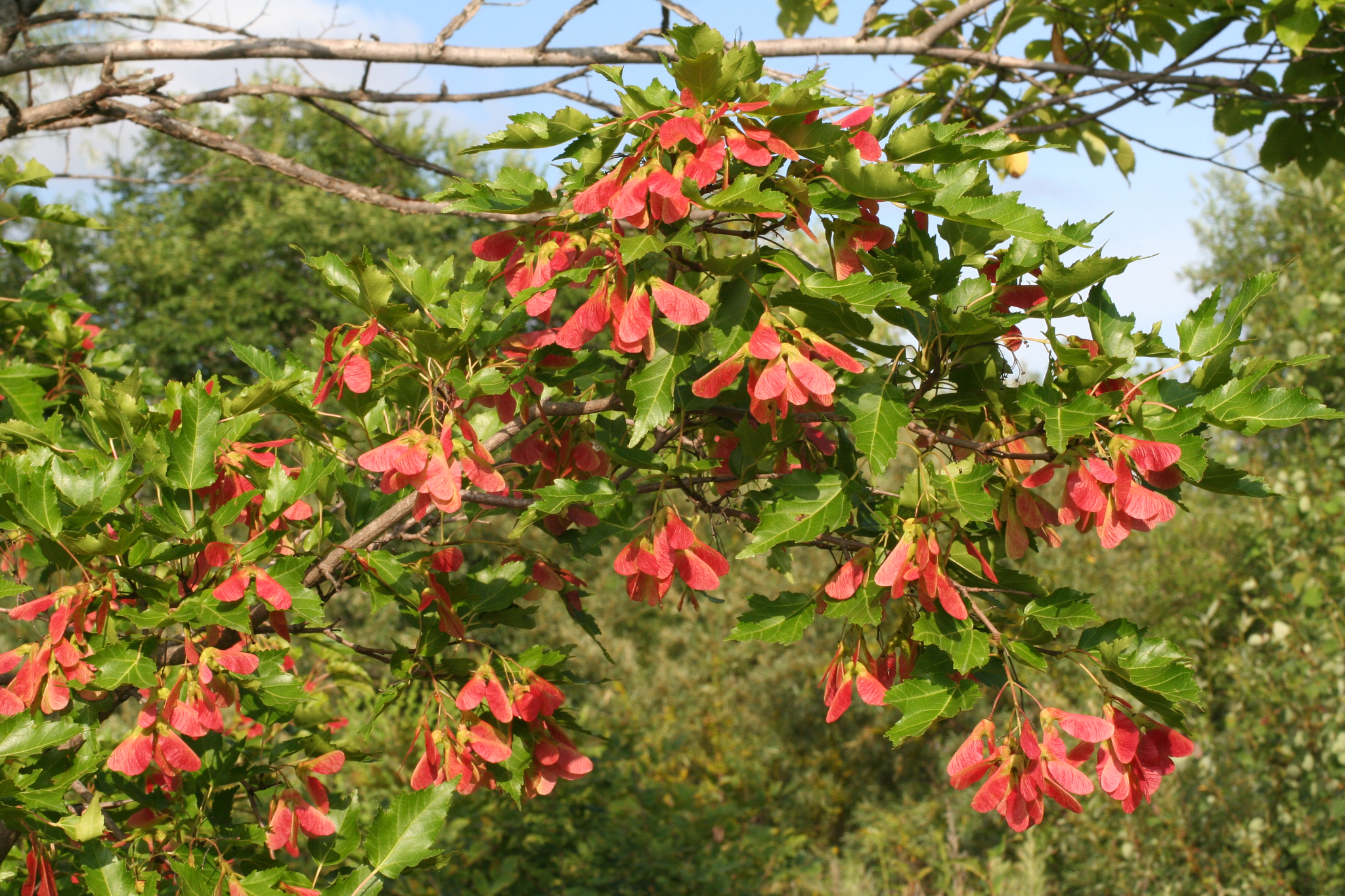
- Amur maple in fruit, beside the Amur River in Khabarovsk Krai, Russia

Scientific classification
- Kingdom: Plantae
- Clade: Embryophytes
- Clade: Tracheophytes
- Clade: Angiosperms
- Clade: Eudicots
- Clade: Rosids
- Order: Sapindales
- Family: Sapindaceae
- Genus: Acer
- Section: Acer sect. Ginnala
- Species: A. tataricum
- Subspecies: A. t. subsp. ginnala

Trinomial name
- Acer tataricum subsp. ginnala (Maxim.) Wesm. (1890)
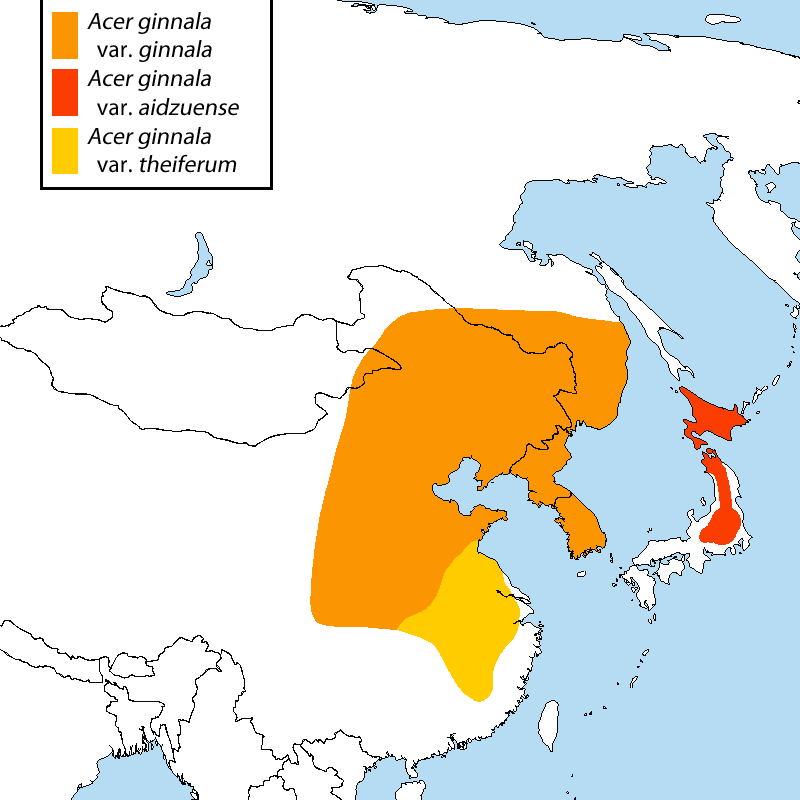

Synonyms
- Acer ginnala Maxim. (1856); Acer acinatum Voss (1894); Acer tataricum var. laciniatum Regel (1857)

= Acer tataricum subsp. ginnala =

Species of plant

Acer tataricum subsp. ginnala, the Amur maple, often treated as a distinct species Acer ginnala, is a plant species with woody stems native to northeastern Asia from easternmost Mongolia east to Korea and Japan, and north to the Russian Far East in the Amur River valley. It is a small maple with deciduous leaves that is sometimes grown as a garden subject, in parks, or as a street tree.

== Description ==
It is a deciduous spreading shrub or small tree growing to 3–10 m (9.8–32.8 ft) tall, with a short trunk up to 20–40 cm (8–16 in) diameter and slender branches. The bark is thin, dull grey-brown, and smooth at first but becoming shallowly fissured on old plants. The leaves are opposite and simple, 4–10 cm (1 1/2–4 in) long and 3–6 cm (1 1/4–2 1/4 in) wide, deeply palmately lobed with three or five lobes, of which two small basal lobes (sometimes absent) and three larger apical lobes; the lobes are coarsely and irregularly toothed, and the upper leaf surface glossy. The leaves turn brilliant orange to red in autumn, and are on slender, often pink-tinged, petioles 3–5 cm (1 1/4–2 in) long. The flowers are yellow-green, 5–8 mm (0.20–0.31 in) diameter, produced in spreading panicles in spring as the leaves open. The fruit is a paired reddish samara, 8–10 mm (0.31–0.39 in) long with a 1.5–2 cm (5/8–3/4 in) wing, maturing in late summer to early autumn.

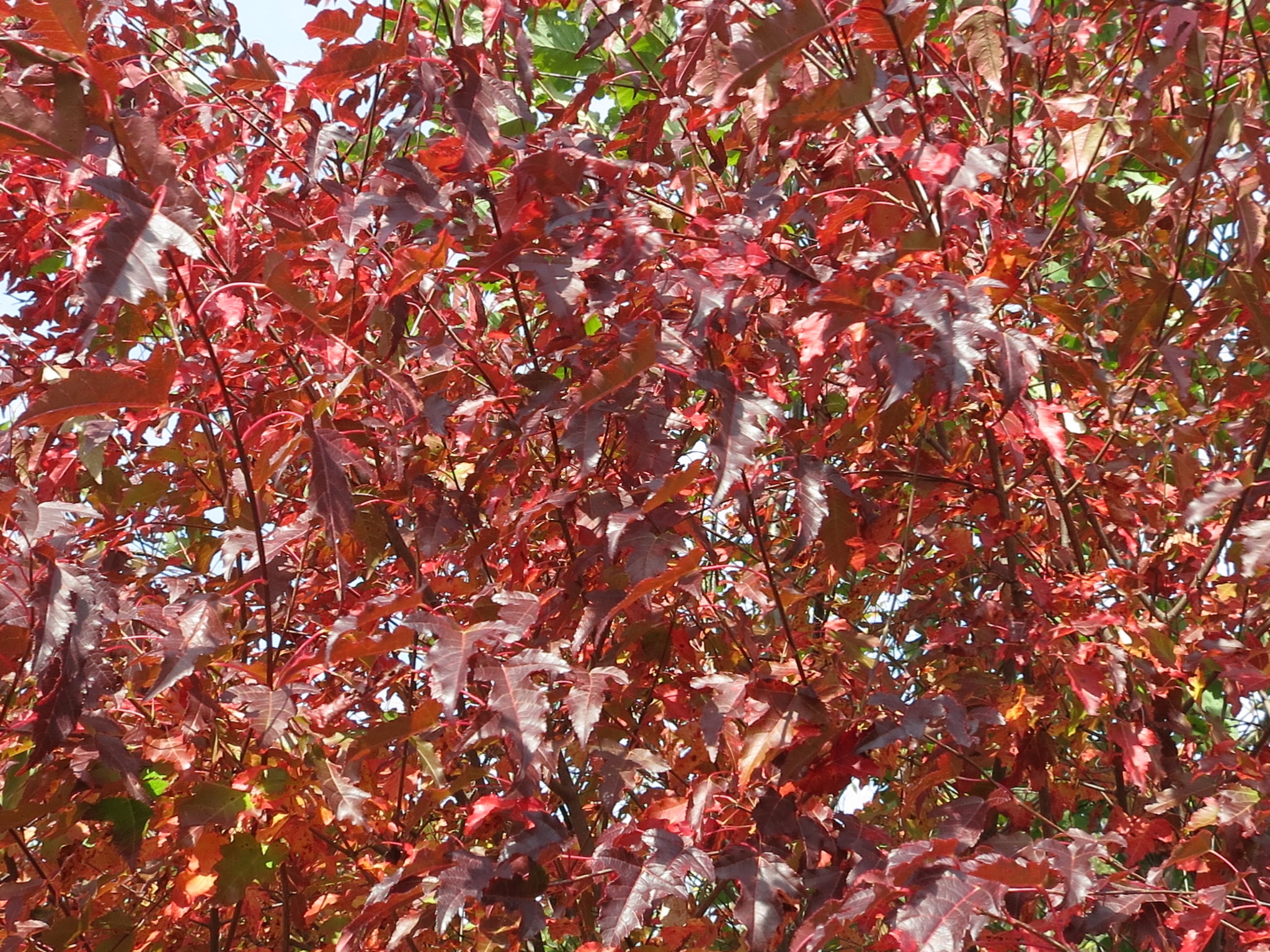
Autumn leaf colour; Primor'ye, Russia

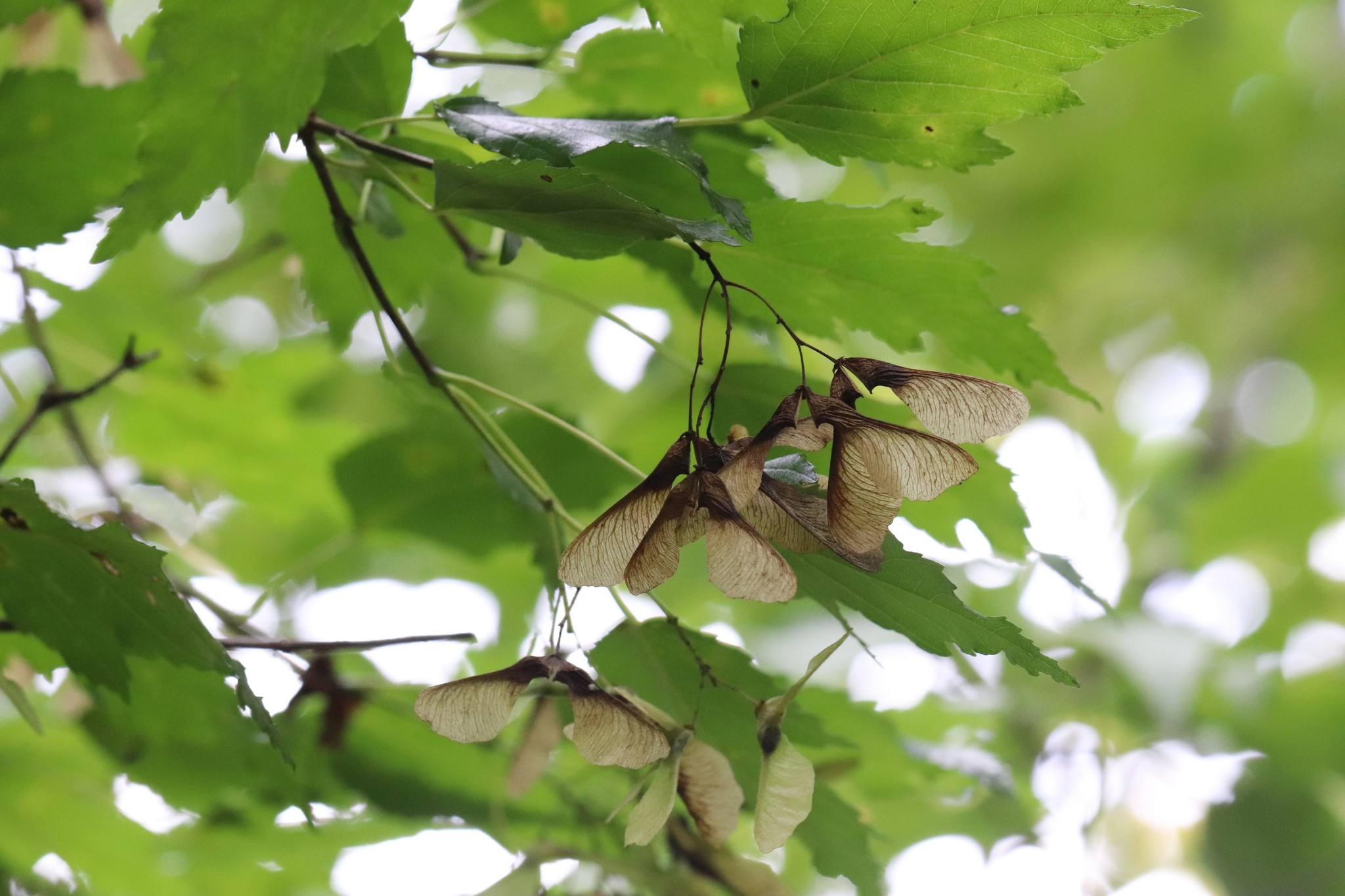
Fruit; Primor'ye, Russia

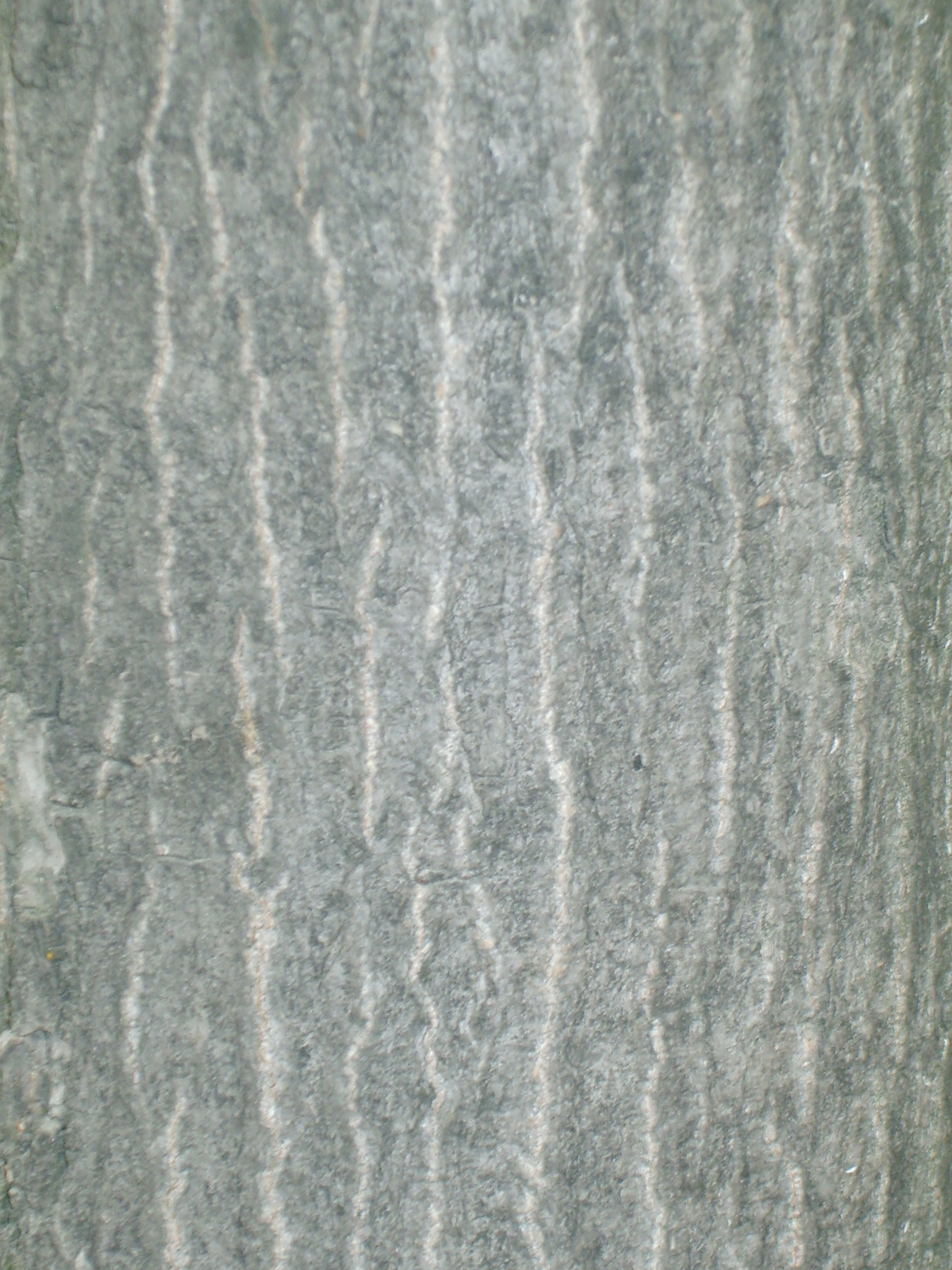
Trunk; Incheon, Korea

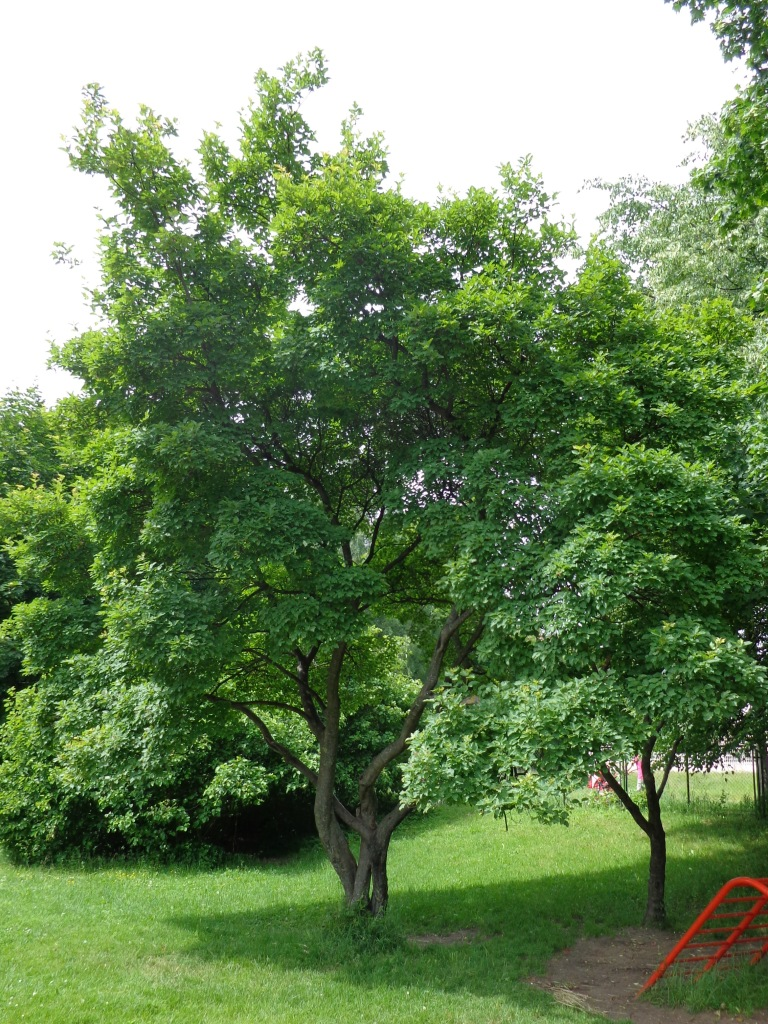
Mature tree; cultivated, Rīga, Latvia

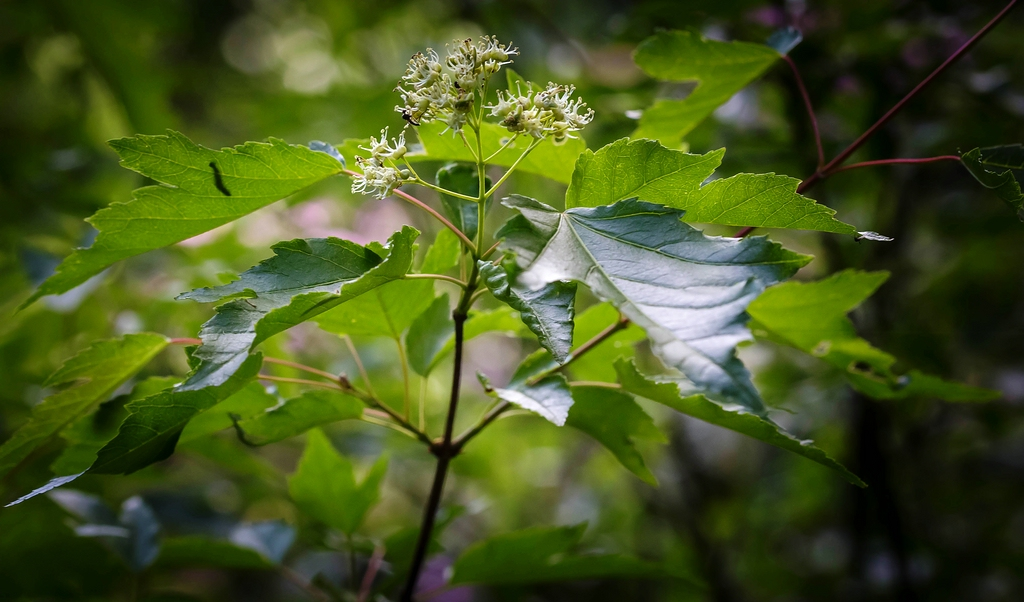
Flowers; cultivated, Tharandt, Germany

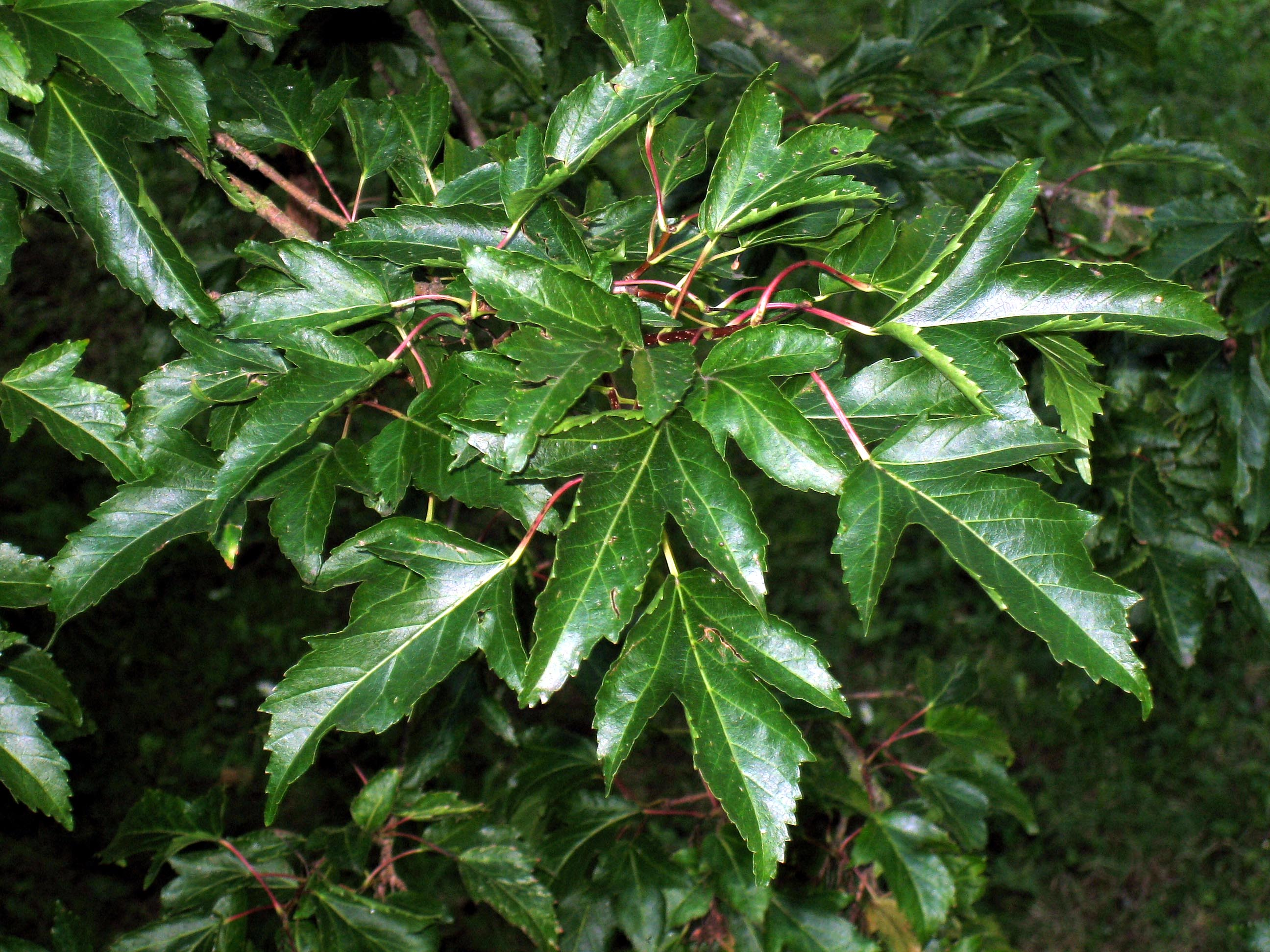
Leaves in summer; cultivated, England

== Taxonomy ==
Amur maple is treated either as a subspecies of Acer tataricum (Tatar maple), or as a distinct species in its own right, Acer ginnala. The glossy, deeply lobed leaves of subsp. ginnala distinguish it from subsp. tataricum, which has matt, unlobed or only shallowly lobed leaves; it is separated from subsp. tataricum by a roughly 3,000 km range gap across central Asia.

== Cultivation and uses ==
Amur maple is grown as an ornamental tree in northern regions of Europe and North America. It is the most cold-tolerant maple, hardy to zone 2. It is naturalised in parts of North America. Planted on exceptional sites facing south west with consistent moisture and light loamy soils, this tree can grow 1 m (3 ft 3 in) per year making it a fast grower. It is often planted as a shrub along borders.

In the UK it has gained the Royal Horticultural Society's Award of Garden Merit.

It is also valued in Japan and elsewhere as a species suitable for bonsai.

It is a nonnative invasive species in parts of northern North America.

== Cultivars ==
Due to its vigour and fall colours of yellows and bright reds, the size being a small tree of 6 metres (20 feet) wide by 6 m tall on average, it suits many for smaller landscapes and for planting under power lines. Cultivars have emerged for those wanting these attributes.

- Flame (Fiery red autumn foliage, very strong vigour)
- Uppsala E (very strong aroma)
