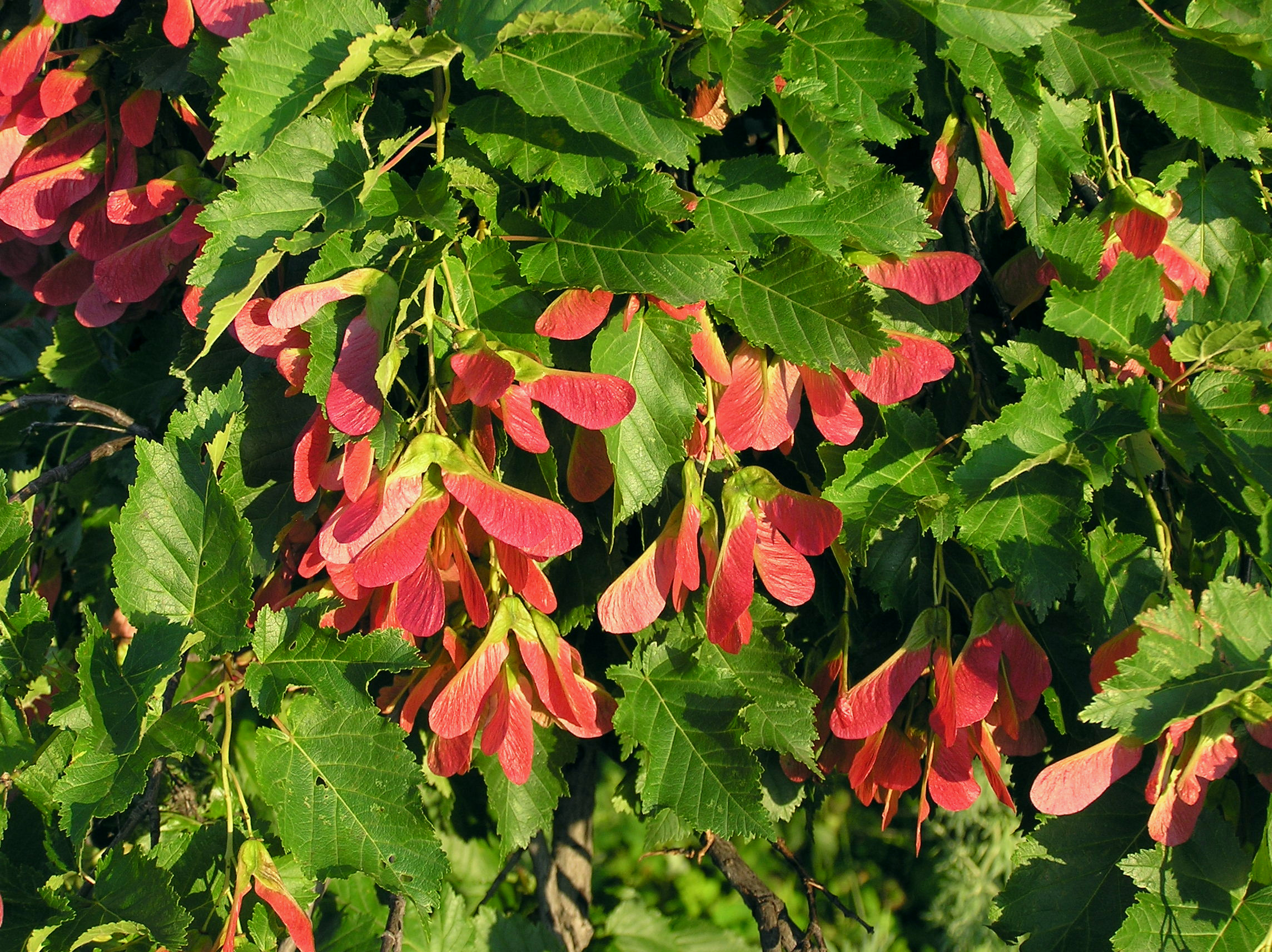
- Foliage and fruit, Saratov, Russia

Conservation status
- Least Concern (IUCN 3.1)

Scientific classification
- Kingdom: Plantae
- Clade: Tracheophytes
- Clade: Angiosperms
- Clade: Eudicots
- Clade: Rosids
- Order: Sapindales
- Family: Sapindaceae
- Genus: Acer
- Section: Acer sect. Ginnala
- Species: A. tataricum

Binomial name
- Acer tataricum L. 1753
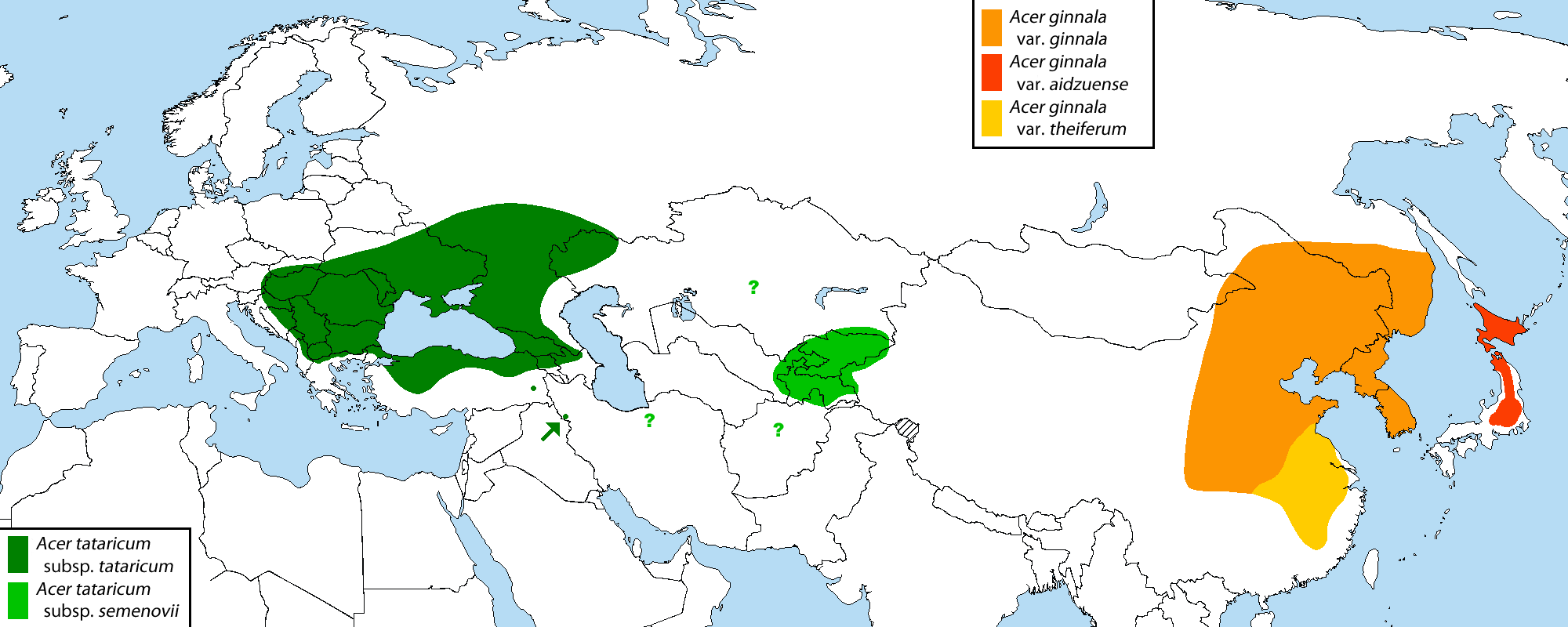
- Acer tataricum sensu lato distribution; sensu stricto in green

Synonyms
- List: Acer cordifolium Moench; Euacer tataricum (L.) Opiz; Acer aidzuense (Franch.) Nakai; Acer subintegrum Pojark.; Acer ginnala Maxim.; Acer theiferum W.P.Fang; Acer semenovii Regel & Herder

= Acer tataricum =

Species of tree

Acer tataricum, the Tatar maple or Tatarian maple, is a species of maple widespread across central and southeastern Europe and temperate Asia, from Austria and Turkey, and in some circumscriptions, with a disjunct population in eastern Asia in northern and central China, Japan and the Russian Far East. The species is named after the Tatar peoples of southern Russia; the tree's name is similarly commonly also misspelled "Tartar" or "Tartarian" in English.

== Description ==
Acer tataricum is a deciduous spreading shrub or small tree growing to 4–12 metres (13–39 ft) tall, with a short trunk up to 20–50 centimetres (7.9–19.7 in) diameter and slender branches. The bark is thin, pale brown, and smooth at first but becoming shallowly fissured on old plants. The leaves are opposite and simple, broadly ovate, 4.5–10 centimetres (1.8–3.9 in) long and 3–7 centimetres (1.2–2.8 in) broad, unlobed or with three or five shallow lobes, and matt green above; the leaf margin is coarsely and irregularly toothed; the leaf petiole is slender, often pink-tinged, 2–5 centimetres (0.79–1.97 in) long. The flowers are whitish-green, 5–8 millimetres (0.20–0.31 in) diameter, produced in spreading panicles in spring as the leaves open. The fruit is a paired reddish samara, 10–12 millimetres (0.39–0.47 in) long with a 2–3 centimetres (0.79–1.18 in) wing, maturing in late summer to early autumn.

== Taxonomy ==
Subspecies accepted by the Plant List maintained by Kew Gardens in London:

- Acer tataricum subsp. aidzuense (Franch.) P.C.DeJong . Japan. Included in Amur maple when that is treated as a separate species.
- Acer tataricum subsp. ginnala (Maxim.) Wesm. (Amur maple, syn. Acer ginnala). Korea, easternmost Mongolia, eastern Russia, northeastern China
- Acer tataricum subsp. semenovii (Regel & Herder) A.E.Murray - Central Asia in Afghanistan, southern Kazakhstan, Kyrgyzstan, Tajikistan, Turkmenistan, westernmost Tibet
- Acer tataricum subsp. tataricum - Caucasus, Turkey, Austria, Bulgaria, Hungary, Romania, Serbia, Ukraine, Iran
- Acer tataricum subsp. theiferum (W.P.Fang) Y.S.Chen & P.C.de Jong - eastern China. Included in Amur maple when that is treated as a separate species.

Some botanists treat Acer tataricum subsp. ginnala as a separate species Acer ginnala. The two differ conspicuously in the glossy, deeply lobed leaves of A. ginnala, compared to the matt, unlobed or only shallowly lobed leaves of A. tataricum, and are separated by a roughly 3,000 km range gap.

== Gallery ==
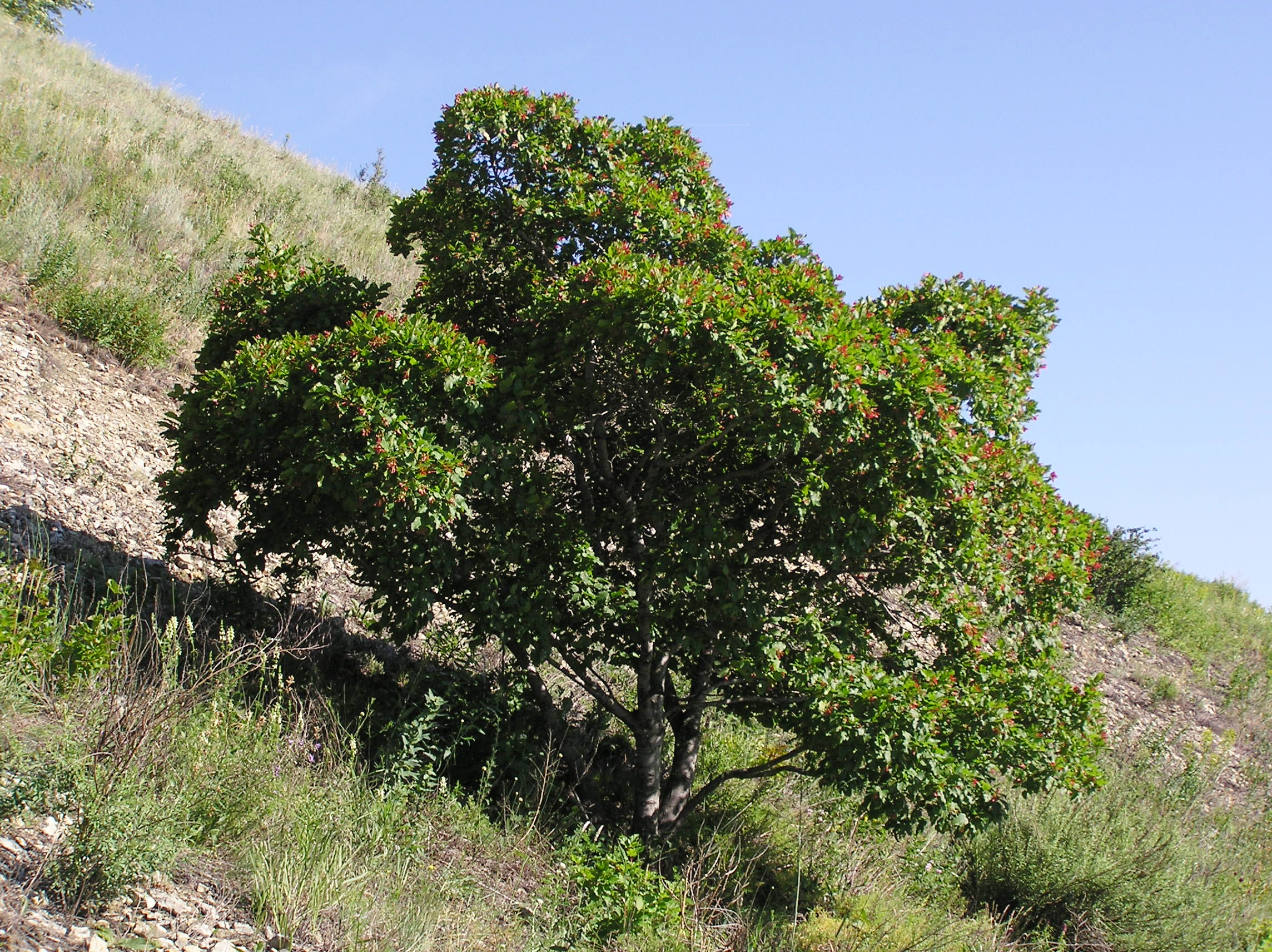
Plant in summer; Saratov, Russia

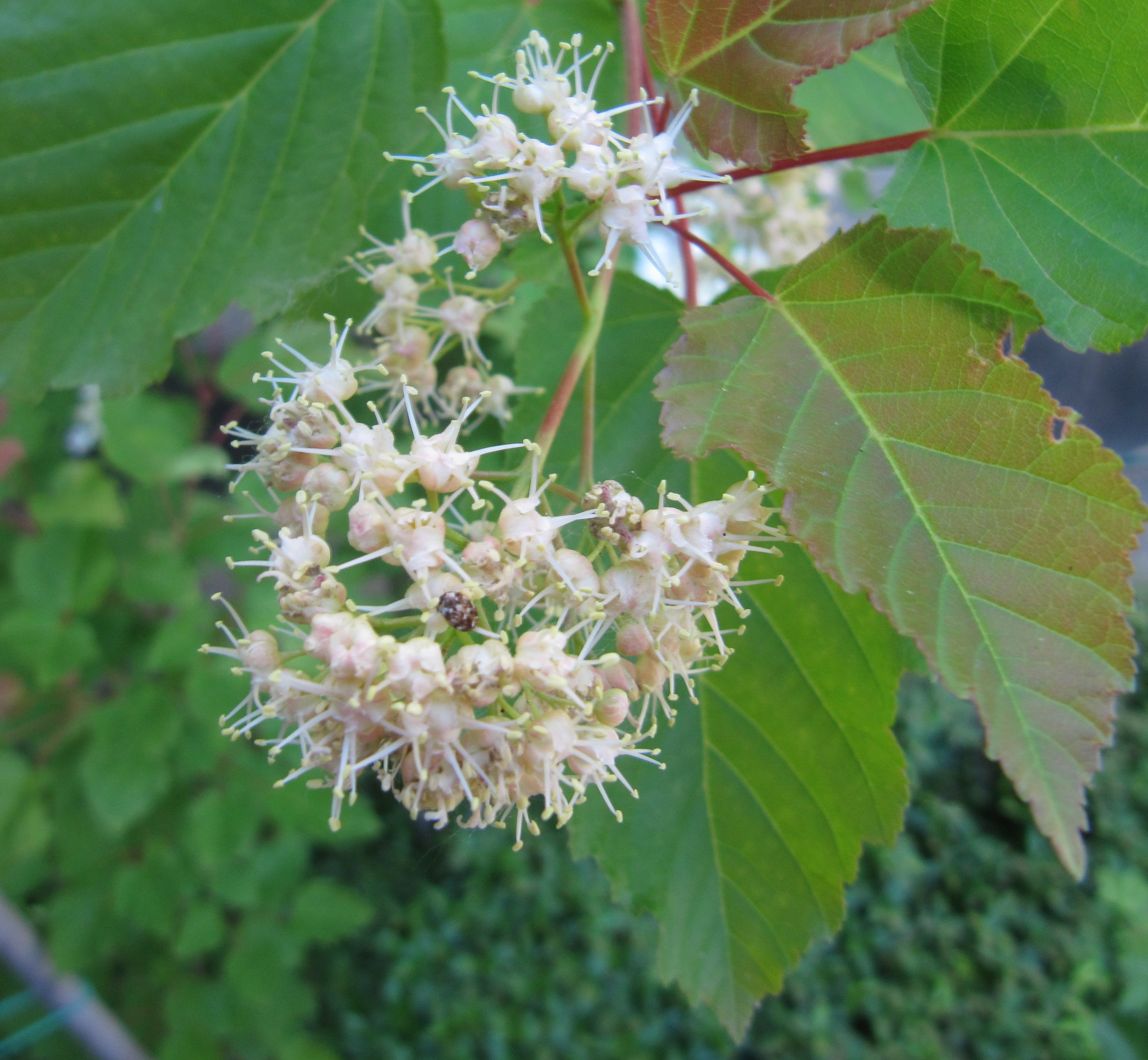
Flowers; Saratov, Russia

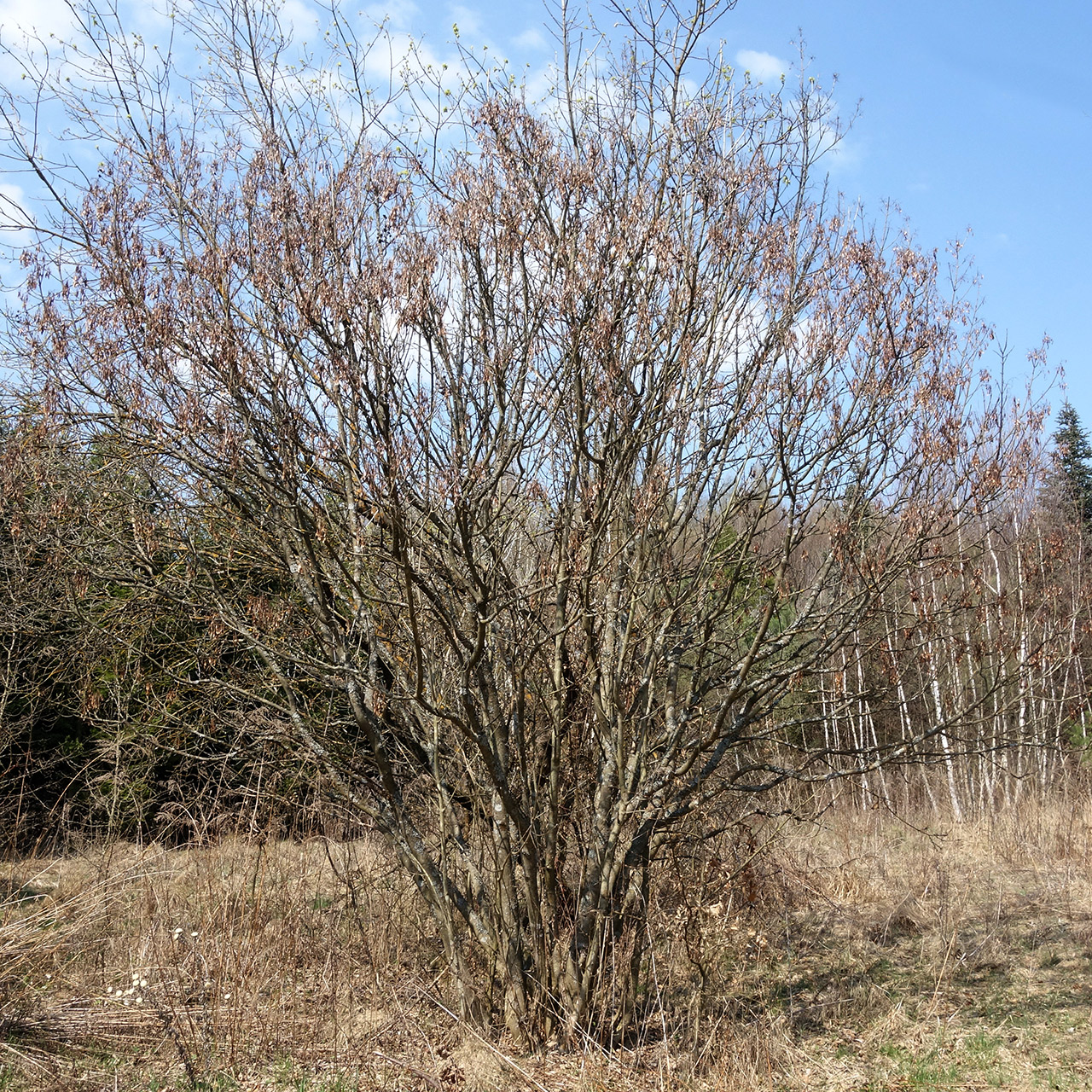
Plant in winter; Slovakia

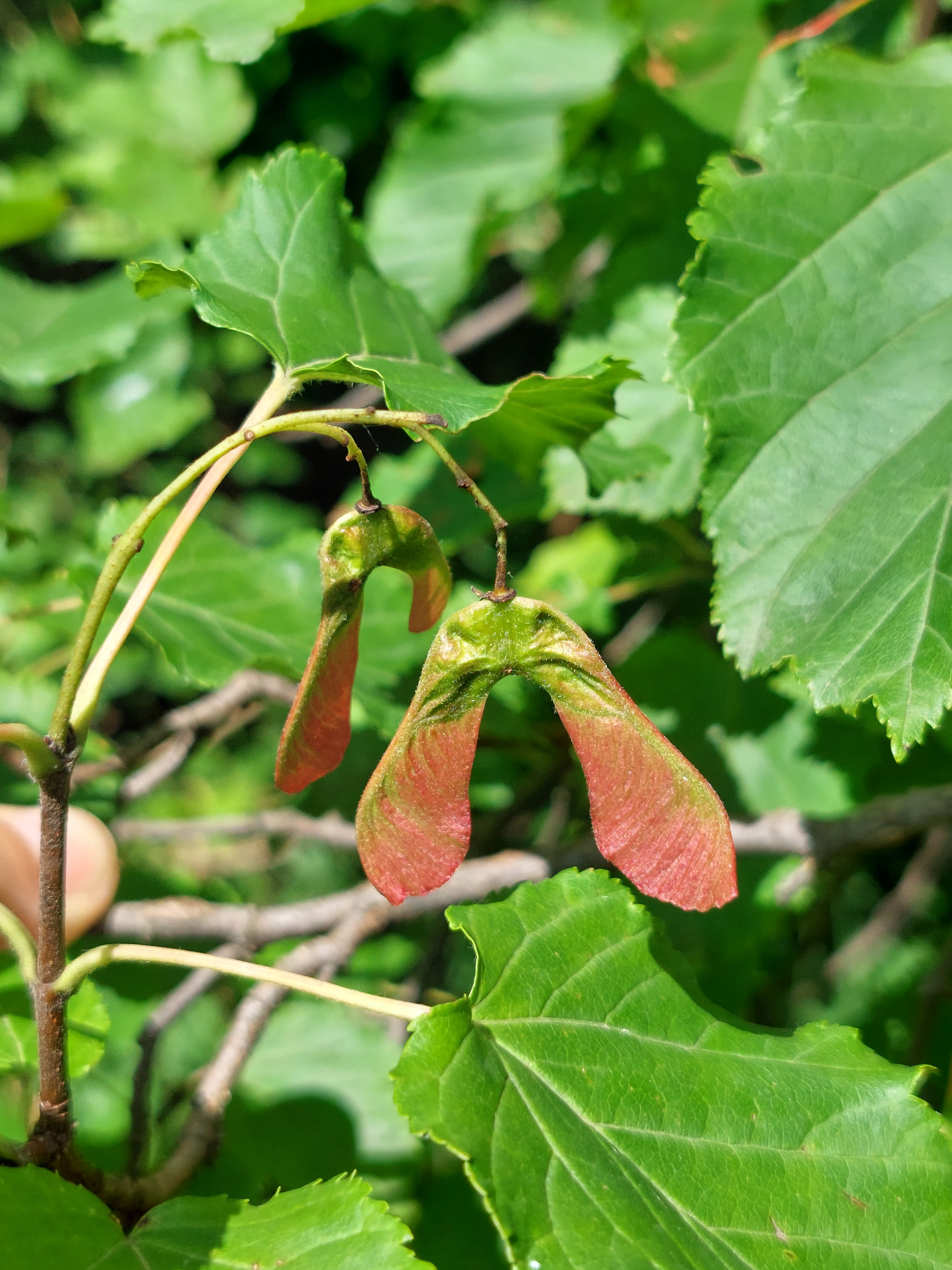
Foliage and fruit; Serbia

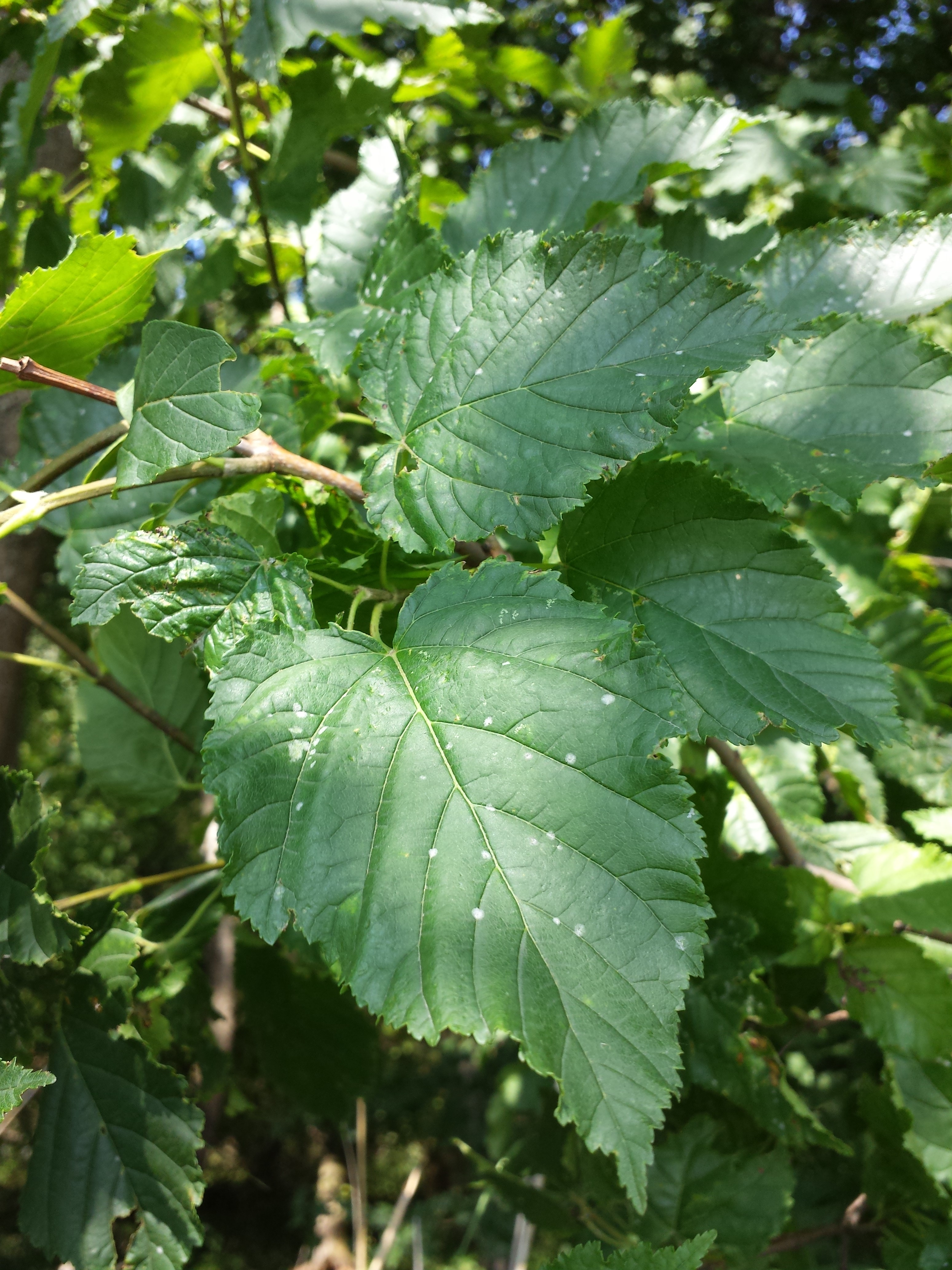
Leaves; Neusiedl am See, Austria

== Cultivation and uses ==
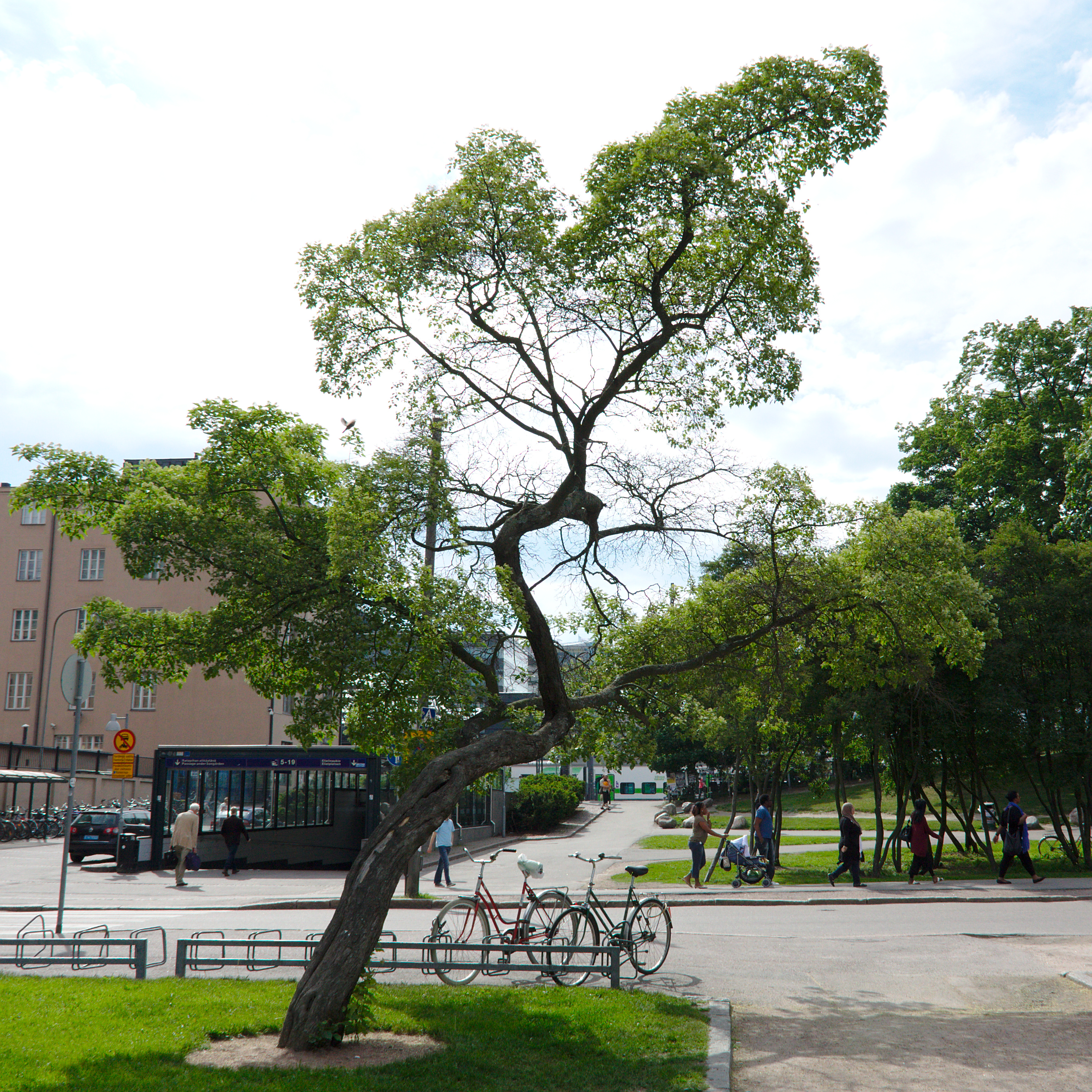
Tatar maple cultivated near the central railway station in Helsinki, Finland.

Tatar maple is occasionally grown as an ornamental plant in gardens throughout Europe and also in North America. In Russia, it is valued in farmland shelterbelts. It is locally naturalised and sometimes invasive in eastern North America.
