= List of plants of Cerrado vegetation of Brazil =

Plants found in the Cerrado biome in Brazil

This is a list of plants found in the wild in cerrado vegetation of Brazil.

== Acanthaceae ==
- Anisacanthus trilobus Lindau
- Dianthera angustifolia (Nees) Benth. & Hook.f. ex B.D.Jacks.
- Dicliptera mucronifolia Nees
- Dicliptera sericea Nees
- Geissomeria ciliata Rizzini
- Geissomeria dawsonii Leonard
- Geissomeria longiflora Salzm. ex Nees (= Geissomeria macrophylla Nees)
- Geissomeria schottiana Nees
- Hygrophila costata Sinning
- Justicia burchellii Hiern
- Justicia chrysotrichoma Pohl ex (Ness)
- Justicia genistiformis Nees
- Justicia irwinii Wassh.
- Justicia lanstyakii Rizzini
- Justicia nodicaulis Pohl ex Nees
- Justicia phyllocalyx (Lindau) Wassh. & C.Ezcurra (= Sericographis macedoana Rizzini)
- Justicia pycnophylla Lindau
- Justicia riparia C.Kameyama (= Beloperone mollis Nees)
- Justicia sarothroides Lindau
- Justicia serrana C.Kameyama
- Justicia tocantina Nees var. longispicus Rizzini (= Chaetothylax tocantinus, Justicia tocantinus)
- Justicia warmingii Hiern
- Lepidagathis alopecuroidea R.Br. ex Griseb.
- Lepidagathis cyanea (Leonard) Kameyama
- Lepidagathis floribunda (Pohl) Kameyama
- Lepidagathis laxifolia (Nees) Kameyama
- Lepidagathis montana (Mart. ex Nees) Kameyama
- Lepidagathis sessilifolia (Pohl) Kameyama ex Wassh. & J.R.I.Wood
- Lophostachys falcata Nees
- Mendoncia puberula Nees
- Mendoncia velloziana Nees
- Mendoncia mollis Lindau
- Poikilacanthus oncodes Lindau
- Ruellia acutangula Nees ex Mart.
- Ruellia angustifolia Sessé et Moc.
- Ruellia angustior (Nees) Lindau
- Ruellia asperula Benth. et Hook.f.
- Ruellia bahiensis (Nees) Morong
- Ruellia brevicaulis Baker
- Ruellia brevifolia (Pohl) C. Ezcurra
- Ruellia capitata D.Don
- Ruellia (Scorodoxylum) costata (Nees) Hiern var. latifolium Nees
- Ruellia (Scorodoxylum) costata (Nees) Hiern var. salicifolium Nees
- Ruellia densa Hiern
- Ruellia dissitifolia Hiern.
- Ruellia elegans Poir.
- Ruellia eriocalyx Glaz.
- Ruellia eurycodon Lindau
- Ruellia flava Roxb.
- Ruellia geminiflora Kunth
- Ruellia hapalotricha Lindau
- Ruellia helianthema (Nees) Profice
- Ruellia humilis Pohl ex Nees
- Ruellia hypericoides Lindau
- Ruellia incomta Lindau
- Ruellia jussieuoides Schltdl. & Cham.
- Ruellia macrantha Mart. ex Nees
- Ruellia menthoides Hiern
- Ruellia multifolia (Nees) Lindau
- Ruellia neesiana Lindau
- Ruellia (Dipteracanthus) nitens (Nees) Wassh.
- Ruellia (Dipteracanthus) pohlii Nees
- Ruellia rasa Hiern
- Ruellia rufipila Rizzini
- Ruellia stenandrium Pohl ex Nees
- Ruellia trachyphylla Lindau
- Ruellia verbasciformis Nees
- Ruellia villosa Lindau
- Staurogyne elegans Kuntze
- Staurogyne hirsuta Kuntze
- Staurogyne minarum Kuntze
- Stenandrium hirsutum Nees
- Stenandrium pohlii Nees

== Alismataceae ==
- Echinodorus bolivianus (Rusby) Holm-Niels.
- Echinodorus grandiflorus (Cham. et Schltdl.) Micheli ssp. grandiflorus (=Echinodorus pubescens Seub. ex Warm.)
- Echinodorus grandiflorus (Cham. & Schltdl.) Micheli ssp. aureus (Fasset.) Haynes et Holm-Niels.
- Echinodorus grisebachii Small
- Echinodorus guyanensis Griseb. (=Sagittaria guyanensis Kunth)
- Echinodorus longipetalus Micheli
- Echinodorus macrophyllus (Kunth.) Micheli ssp. scaber (Rataj.) Hayne et Holm-Niels.
- Echinodorus martii Micheli
- Echinodorus paniculatus Micheli
- Echinodorus alatus (Mart.) Griseb. ssp. alatus
- Echinodorus alatus (Mart.) Griseb. ssp. andrieuxii (Hook. & Arn.) Hayne & Holm-Niels.
- Echinodorus tenellus Buchen. (=Alisma tenellum Mart.)
- Echinodorus tunicatus Small
- Ottelia brasiliensis Walp.
- Sagittaria guayanensis Kunth. ssp. guayanensis
- Sagittaria lagoensis Seub. et Warm.
- Sagittaria planitiana G.Agostini
- Sagittaria rhombifolia Cham.

== Alstroemeriaceae (Liliaceae) ==
- Alstroemeria brasiliensis Spreng.
- Alstroemeria burchelii Baker
- Alstroemeria caryophyllacea Jacq.
- Alstroemeria cunea Vell.
- Alstroemeria foliosa Mart.
- Alstroemeria gardneri Baker
- Alstroemeria plantaginea Mart.
- Alstroemeria psittacina Lehm.
- Alstroemeria pulchella L.f.
- Alstroemeria scarlatina Ravenna
- Alstroemeria stenocephala Schenk
- Alstroemeria viridiflora Warm.
- Alstroemeria zamioides Baker

== Amaranthaceae ==
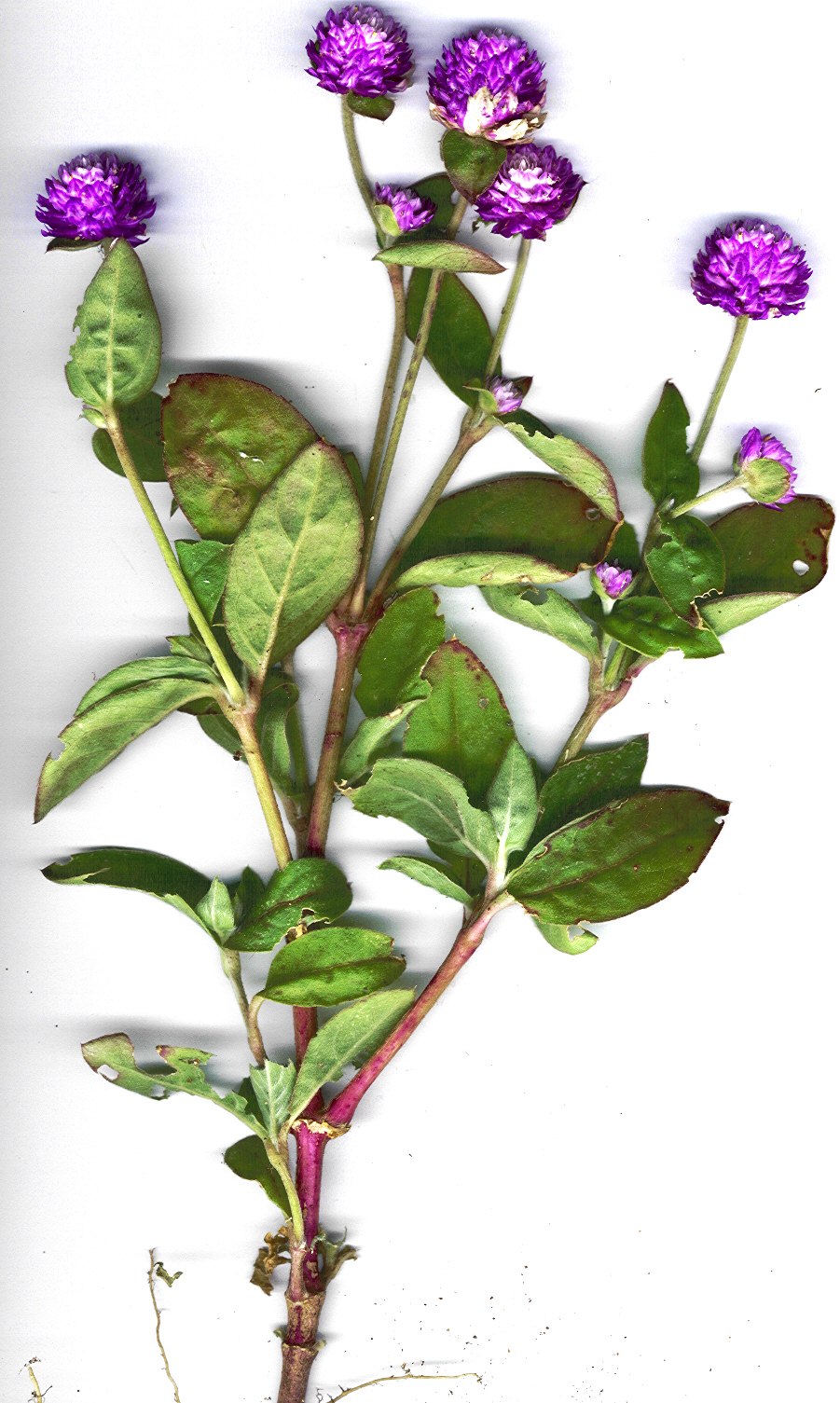
Gomphrena globosa, from Hawaiian Ecosystems at Risk project

- Alternanthera brasiliana (L.) Kuntze
- Alternanthera brasiliana (L.) O.Kuntze var. moquinii (Webb. ex Moq.) Uline
- Alternanthera brasiliana (L.) O.Kuntze var. villosa (Moq.) O.Kuntze
- Alternanthera martii (Moq.) R.E.Fries
- Alternanthera tenella Collad.
- Amaranthus flavus L.
- Amaranthus paniculatus Walf. (=Amaranthus caudatus L.)
- Chamissoa acuminata Mart.
- Chamissoa altissima Kunth
- Chamissoa maximiliani Mart. ex Moq.
- Froelichiella grisea (Lopr.) R.E.Fr.
- Gomphrena agrestis Mart.
- Gomphrena aphylla Pohl ex Moq. (=Gomphrena equisetiformis R.E.Fr.)
- Gomphrena celosioides Mart.
- Gomphrena claussenii Moq.
- Gomphrena decipiens Seub.
- Gomphrena desertorum Mart.
- Gomphrena glabrata Moq. (=Pfaffia glabrata Mart.)
- Gomphrena globosa L.
- Gomphrena graminea Moq.
- Gomphrena hermogenesii J.C. de Siqueira
- Gomphrena lanigera Pohl ex Moq. (=Gomphrena scapigera Mart. var. lanigera (Pohl ex Moq.) Stuchlik)
- Gomphrena macrorhisa Mart.
- Gomphrena matogrossensis Suesseng.
- Gomphrena moquini Seub.
- Gomphrena officinalis Mart. (=G. arborescens L.f., or G. macrocephala A.St.-Hil.)
- Gomphrena pohlii Moq.
- Gomphrena prostrata Mart.
- Gomphrena rudis Moq.
- Gomphrena scapigera Mart.
- Gomphrena vaga Mart.
- Gomphrena velutina Moq.
- Gomphrena virgata Mart.
- Pfaffia cinera (Moq.) O.Kuntze
- Pfaffia denutata (Moq.) O.Kuntze
- Pfaffia glomerata (Spreng.) Pedersen
- Pfaffia gnaphaloides (L. f.) Mart.
- Pfaffia helichrysoides (Moq.) O.Kuntze
- Pfaffia jubata Mart. (=Gomphrena jubata Moq.)
- Pfaffia paniculata (Mart.) Kuntze
- Pfaffia sericantha (Mart.) T.M.Pedersen
- Pfaffia sericea (Spreng.) Mart.
- Pfaffia townsendii Pedersen
- Pfaffia tuberosa (Spreng.) Hick.
- Pfaffia velutina Mart.
- Xerosiphon aphyllus (Pohl ex Moq.) Pedersen

== Amaryllidaceae (Liliaceae) ==
- Amaryllis heringerii Ravenna
- Crinum virgineum Mart.
- Griffinia liboriana Lem.
- Hippeastrum aulicum (Ker Gawl.) Herb.
- Hippeastrum calyptratum Herb. (=Amaryllis unguiculata Mart.)
- Hippeastrum gayanum Kuntze
- Hippeastrum goianum Ravenna (=Amaryllis goiana Ravenna)
- Hippeastrum psittacinum Herb. (=Amaryllis psittacina Ker Gawl.)
- Hippeastrum puniceum (Lam.) Kuntze
- Hippeastrum solandriferum Herb.
- Zephyranthes franciscana Herb. ex Baker, Zephyranthes robusta Herb.

== Anacardiaceae ==
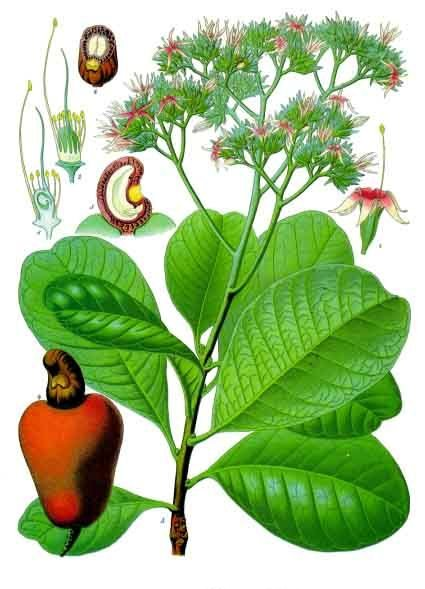
Anacardium occidentale, from Koehler's Medicinal-Plants (1887)

- Anacardium corymbosum B. Rod.
- Anacardium humile A.St.-Hil.
- Anacardium nanum A.St.-Hil.
- Anacardium occidentale L. (=Anacardium curatellifolium A.St.-Hil.)
- Anacardium othonianum Rizzini
- Astronium fraxinifolium Schott
- Astronium gracile Engl.
- Astronium graveolens Jacq.
- Astronium nelson-rosae Santin
- Astronium ulei Mattick
- Lithraea molleoides (Vell.) Engl.
- Myracrodruon urundeuva M.Allemão (=Astronium urundeuva Engl.)
- Schinus terebinthifolius Raddi
- Schinus terebinthifolius Raddi var. pohlianus Engl.
- Spondias mombin L.
- Spondias purpurea L.
- Tapirira guianensis Aubl.
- Tapirira marchandii Engl.
- Tapirira obtusa (Benth.) J.D.Mitchell

== Annonaceae ==
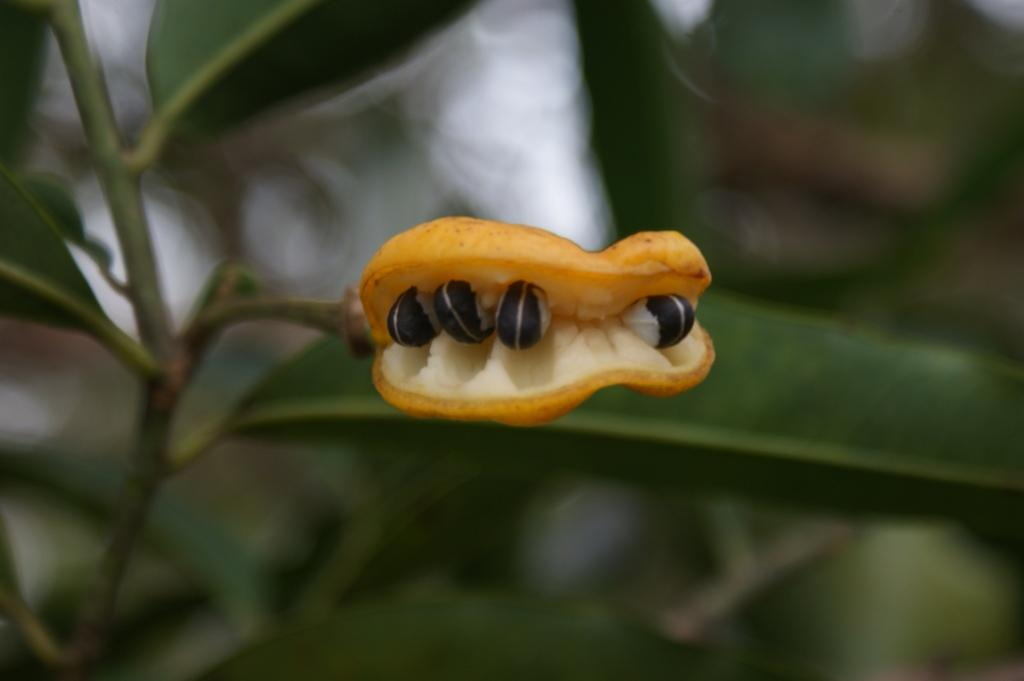
Fruit of Cardiopetalum calophyllum

- Annona cacans Warm.
- Annona campestris R.E.Fr.
- Annona coriacea Mart.
- Annona cornifolia A.St.-Hil.
- Annona crassiflora Mart.
- Annona crotonifolia Mart.
- Annona dioica A.St.-Hil.
- Annona dolabripetala Raddi
- Annona emarginata (Schltdl.) H.Rainer
- Annona malmeana R.E.Fr.
- Annona montana Macfad.
- Annona monticola Mart.
- Annona mucosa Jacq.
- Annona muricata L.
- Annona neosericea H.Rainer
- Annona pygmaea W.Bartram
- Annona reticulata L.
- Annona sylvatica A.St.-Hil.
- Annona tomentosa R.E.Fr.
- Bocageopsis mattogrosensis R.E.Fr.
- Cardiopetalum calophyllum Schltdl.
- Duguetia echinophora R.E.Fr.
- Duguetia furfuracea (A.St.-Hil.) Benth. & Hook.
- Duguetia lanceolata A.St.-Hil.
- Duguetia marcgraviana Mart.
- Ephedranthus parviflorus S.Moore
- Guatteria ferruginea A.St.-Hil.
- Guatteria nigrescens Mart.
- Guatteria parvifolia R.E.Fr.
- Guatteria pohliana Schltdl. ex Mart.
- Guatteria rupestris Mello-Silva et Pirani
- Guatteria sellowiana Schltdl.
- Guatteria silvatica R.E.Fr.
- Guatteria villosissima A.St.-Hil.
- Oxandra reticulata Maas
- Unonopsis guatterioides (DC.) R.E.Fr.
- Unonopsis lindmanii R.E.Fr.
- Uvaria macrocarpa Warm.
- Xylopia aromatica (Lam.) Mart.
- Xylopia brasiliensis Spreng.
- Xylopia emarginata Mart.
- Xylopia frutescens Aubl.
- Xylopia grandiflora A.St.-Hil.
- Xylopia sericea A.St.-Hil.

== Apocynaceae ==
- Allamanda angustifolia Pohl
- Allamanda puberula var. glabrata Müll.Arg.
- Aspidosperma cylindrocarpon Müll.Arg.
- Aspidosperma dasycarpon A.DC.
- Aspidosperma macrocarpon Mart.
- Aspidosperma parvifolium A.DC.
- Aspidosperma subincanum Mart.
- Aspidosperma tomentosum Mart.
- Hancornia speciosa Gomes
- Himatanthus obovatus (Müll.Arg.) Woodson

== Aquifoliaceae ==
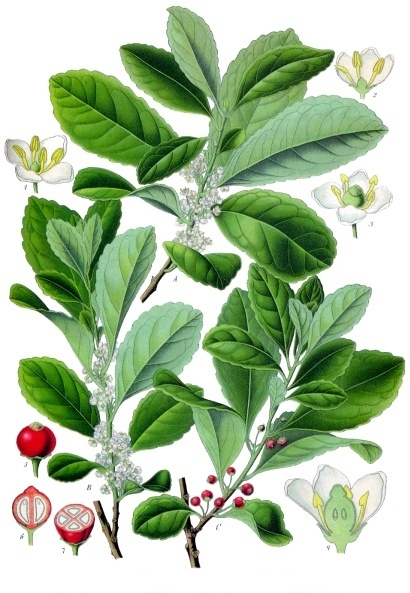
Ilex paraguariensis, from Koehler's Medicinal-Plants (1887)

- Ilex brasiliensis (Spreng.) Loes.
- Ilex cerasifolia Reissek
- Ilex conocarpa Reissek
- Ilex paraguariensis A.St.-Hil.

== Araliaceae ==
- Didymopanax macrocarpum (Cham. et Schltdl.) Seem.
- Didymopanax morototoni (Aubl.) Decne.
- Didymopanax vinosum Marchal

== Arecaceae ==
- Acrocomia aculeata (Jacq.) Lodd. ex Mart.
- Attalea geraensis Barb. Rodr.
- Butia leiospatha (Barb. Rodr.) Becc.
- Butia paraguayensis (Barb. Rodr.) L.H.Bailey
- Mauritia flexuosa L.f.
- Mauritia vinifera Mart.

== Asteraceae ==
- Achyrocline satureioides (Lam.) DC.
- Adenosthema viscosum Forst.
- Aspilia latissima Malme
- Baccharis dracunculifolia DC.
- Baccharis trimera DC.
- Bidens gardneri Baker
- Eremanthus goyazensis Sch. Bip.
- Eremanthus mattogrossensis Kuntze
- Eremanthus sphaerocephalus (DC.) Baker
- Piptocarpha rotundifolia (Less.) Baker
- Vanillosmopsis erythropappa (DC.) Sch. Bip.
- Vanillosmopsis polycephala (DC.) Sch. Bip.
- Vernonia brasiliana (L.) Druce
- Vernonia ferruginea Less
- Vernonia florida Gardner
- Vernonia polyanthes (Spreng.) Less
- Vernonia rubriramea Mart. ex DC.
- Vernonia ruficoma Schltdl.

== Balanophoraceae ==
- Helosis Helosis brasiliensis Schott et Endl.
- Langsdorffia hypogea Mart.

== Begoniaceae ==
- Begonia cucullata Ruiz ex A.DC.
- Begonia fischeri Otto et A.Dietr.
- Begonia leptophylla Taub.
- Begonia lobata Schott

== Bignoniaceae ==
- Anemopaegma arvense (Vell.) Stellf. ex Souza
- Anemopaegma chamberlaynii var. tenerius Lam.
- Anemopaegma glaucum Mart. ex DC.
- Anphilophium aff. paniculatum (L.) Kunth
- Arrabidaea brachypoda (DC.) Bureau et K. Schum.
- Arrabidaea florida DC.
- Arrabidaea pulchra Bureau
- Cybistax antisyphillitica Mart.
- Handroanthus albus
- Jacaranda brasiliana Pers.
- Jacaranda caroba (Vell.) DC.
- Jacaranda decurrens Cham.
- Jacaranda rufa Silva Manso
- Tabebuia aurea Benth. et Hook.f. ex S.Moore
- Tabebuia avellanedae Lorentz ex Griseb.
- Tabebuia caraiba (Mart.) Bureau
- Tabebuia ochracea (Cham.) Standl.
- Tabebuia roseo-alba (Ridl.) Sandw.
- Tabebuia serratifolia (Vahl) Nichols.
- Zeyhera digitalis (Vell.) Hoehne
- Zeyhera montana Mart.
- Zeyhera tuberculosa (Vell.) Bureau

== Bixaceae ==
- Cochlospermum regium (Mart.) Pilg.

== Bombacaceae ==
- Bombax campestre (Mart. et Zucc.) K. Schum.
- Bombax gracilipes K. Schum.
- Bombax pubescens Mart. et Zucc.
- Eriotheca gracilipes (K. Schum.) A. Robyns
- Eriotheca pubescens (Mart. et Zucc.) A. Robyns
- Pseudobombax grandiflorum (Cav.) A. Robyns
- Pseudobombax longiflorum (Mart. et Zucc.) A. Robyns

== Boraginaceae ==
- Cordia sellowiana Cham.
- Cordia trichotoma (Vell.) Arráb. ex Steud.

== Bromeliaceae ==
- Aechmea distichantha Lem.
- Ananas ananassoides (Baker) L.B.Smith
- Bromelia balansae Mez

== Burseraceae ==
- Protium almecega March.
- Protium heptaphyllum (Aubl.) March.
- Protium widgrenii Engl.

== Caesalpinioideae ==
- Acosmium dasycarpum (Vogel) Yak.
- Acosmium subelegans (Molembr.) Yak.
- Apuleia leiocarpa (Vogel) Macbr.
- Bauhinia bongardi Steud.
- Bauhinia forficata Link
- Bauhinia holophylla Steud.
- Bauhinia rufa Steud.
- Chamaecrista campestris (Benth.) Irwin et Barneby
- Chamaecrista cathartica (Mart.) Irwin et Barneby
- Chamaecrista desvauxii (Collad.) Killip. var. glauca (Harsl) Irwin et Barneby
- Chamaecrista desvauxii (Collad.) Killip. var. langsdorffii (Kunth ex Vogel) Irwin et Barneby
- Chamaecrista desvauxii (Collad.) Killip. var. mollissima (Benth) Irwin et Barneby
- Chamaecrista flexuosa (L.) Greene
- Chamaecrista setosa (Vogel) Irwin et Barneby
- Copaifera elliptica Mart.
- Copaifera langsdorffii Desf.
- Copaifera oblongifolia Mart.
- Copaifera officinalis Vell.
- Dimorphandra exaltata Schott
- Dimorphandra mollis Benth.
- Diptychandra aurantiaca (Mart.) Tul.
- Diptychandra glabra Benth.
- Hymenaea stigonocarpa Mart.
- Tachigali aurea Tul.
- Tachigali vulgaris L.F.Gomes da Silva & H.C.Lima (syn. Sclerolobium paniculatum)
- Senna bicapsularis L.
- Senna macranthera (Colladon) lrwin et Barneby
- Senna rugosa (G.Don) Irwin et Barneby
- Senna sylvestris (Vell.) Irwin et Barneby var. bifaria Irwin & Barneby

== Caryocaraceae ==
- Caryocar brasiliense Cambess.

== Celastraceae ==
- Austroplenckia populnea (Reissek ex Mart.) Lundell

== Clethraceae ==
- Clethra brasiliensis Cham. et Schltdl.
- Clethra scabra Pers.

== Clusiaceae ==
- Kielmeyera coriacea Mart. & Zucc.

== Combretaceae ==
- Terminalia argentea Mart. et Zucc.
- Terminalia brasiliensis (Chambess.) Eichler
- Terminalia fagifolia Mart. et Zucc.

== Connaraceae ==
- Connarus cf. regnelli Schel
- Connarus suberosus Planch.

== Dilleniaceae ==
- Curatella americana L.

== Ebenaceae ==
- Diospyros hispida DC.
- Diospyros sericea DC.

== Erythroxylaceae ==
- Erythroxylum ambiguum A.St.-Hil.
- Erythroxylum campestre A.St.-Hil.
- Erythroxylum cuneifolium (Mart.) O.E.Schulz
- Erythroxylum deciduum A.St.-Hil.
- Erythroxylum pelleterianum A.St.-Hil.
- Erythroxylum suberosum A.St.-Hil.
- Erythroxylum tortuosum Mart.

== Euphorbiaceae ==
- Actinostemon conceptionis (Chodat & Hassler) Pax.
- Alchornea triplinervia (Spreng.) Müll.Arg.
- Croton floribunduns Spreng.
- Croton lobatus L.
- Manihot caerulescens Pohl
- Manihot tripartita Müll.Arg.
- Pera glabrata (Schott) Baillon
- Pera obovata Baillon

== Faboideae ==
- Aeschynomene selloi Vogel
- Amburana claudii (Fr.All.) A.C.Smith
- Andira cf. anthelmia (Vell.) Macbr.
- Andira laurifolia Benth.
- Andira humilis Mart. ex Benth.
- Andira inermis (W.Wright) DC.
- Acosmium subelegans (Mohlenbr.) Yakovlev
- Arachis pintoi Krapov. & W.C.Gregory
- Bowdichia virgilioides Kunth
- Camptosema ellipticum (Desv.) Burkart
- Centrosema pubescens Benth.
- Dalbergia miscolobium Benth.
- Dalbergia violaceae (Vogel) Malme
- Dipteryx alata Vogel
- Erythrina mulungu Mart.
- Machaerium aculeatum Raddi
- Machaerium acutifolium Vogel
- Machaerium brasiliense Vogel
- Machaerium nyctitans (Vell.) Benth.
- Machaerium opacum Vogel
- Machaerium scleroxylon Tull.
- Machaerium villosum Vogel
- Ormosia arborea (Vell.) Harms.
- Platypodium elegans Vogel
- Pterodon polygaeflorus Benth.
- Pterodon pubescens Benth.

== Flacourtiaceae ==
- Casearia arborea (Rich.) Urb.
- Casearia decandra Jacq.
- Casearia grandiflora A.St.-Hil.
- Casearia lasiophylla Eichler
- Casearia obliqua Spreng.
- Casearia silvestris Schwartz

== Guttiferae ==
- Calophyllum brasiliense Cambess.
- Kielmeyera coriacea (Spreng.) Mart.
- Kielmeyera rubriflora Cambess.
- Kielmeyera variabilis (Spreng.) Mart.

== Hippocrateaceae ==
- Salacia campestris Walp.
- Salacia crassiflora (Mart.) Peyr.
- Salacia micrantha (Mart.) Peyr.

== Icacinaceae ==
- Emmotum nitens (Benth.) Miers

== Labiatae ==
- Hyptis cana Pohl ex Benth.
- Hyptis crinita Benth.

== Lauraceae ==
- Aiouea trinervea Meisn.
- Nectandra cuspidata Ness et Mart. ex Nees
- Nectandra lanceolata Nees
- Ocotea acutifolia (Nees) Mez
- Ocotea corymbosa Mez
- Ocotea minarum Mart. ex Nees
- Ocotea pulchella Mart.
- Ocotea velutina Mart.
- Persea willdenovii Kosterm.

== Lecythidaceae ==
- Cariniana estrellensis (Raddi) Kuntze

== Loganiaceae ==
- Antonia ovata Pohl
- Strychnos brasiliensis (Spreng.) Mart.
- Strychnos pseudoquina A.St.-Hil.

== Lythraceae ==
- Lafoensia pacari A.St.-Hil.
- Lafoensia replicata Pohl

== Malpighiaceae ==
- Banisteriopsis adenopoda (A.Juss.) B.Gates
- Banisteriopsis campestris (A.Juss.) Settle
- Banisteriopsis pubipetala (A.Juss.) Cuatrec.
- Byrsonima basiloba A.Juss.
- Byrsonima coccolobifolia (Spreng.) Kunth
- Byrsonima coriacea (L.) Kunth
- Byrsonima crassa Nied.
- Byrsonima crassifolia (L.) Kunth
- Byrsonima cydonaefolia A.Juss.
- Byrsonima intermedia A.Juss.
- Byrsonima subterranea Brade et Markgr.
- Byrsonima verbascifolia (L.) Rich. ex A.Juss.

== Melastomataceae ==
- Acisanthera alsinaefolia (DC.) Triana
- Miconia albicans (Sw.) Triana
- Miconia candolleana Triana
- Miconia chamissois Naud.
- Miconia cinerascens Miq.
- Miconia fallax DC.
- Miconia langsdorffii Cogn.
- Miconia ligustroides (DC.) Naud.
- Miconia macothyrsa Benth.
- Miconia minutiflora DC.
- Miconia paulensis Naud.
- Miconia pepericarpa DC.
- Miconia pohliana Cogn.
- Miconia rubiginosa (Bonpl.) DC.
- Miconia sellowiana Naud.
- Miconia stenostachya DC.
- Miconia theezans (Bom.) Cogn.

== Meliaceae ==
- Cedrela fissilis Vell.
- Cedrela odorata L.
- Cabralea cangerana Sald.
- Cabralea polytricha Juss.
- Tapirira guianensis Aubl.
- Tapirira marchandii Engl.

== Mimosaceae ==
- Acacia paniculata Willd.
- Acacia plumosa Lowe.
- Acacia polyphylla DC.
- Anadenanthera falcata (Benth.) Speg.
- Anadenanthera macrocarpa (Benth.) Brenan
- Calliandra macrocephala Benth.
- Enterolobium gummiferum (Mart.) Macbride
- Mimosa acerba Benth.
- Mimosa chaetosphera Barn.
- Mimosa debilis Humb. et Bonpl.
- Mimosa laticifera Rizzini et N.F.Mattos
- Mimosa leptocaulis Benth.
- Platymenia reticulata Benth.
- Stryphnodendron adstringens (Mart.) Coville
- Stryphnodendron obovatum Benth.
- Stryphnodendron polyphyllum Benth.

== Moraceae ==
- Brosimum gaudichaudii Trecul
- Cecropia pachystachia Trecul

== Myrsinaceae ==
- Cybianthus detergens Mart.
- Myrsine ferruginea (Sw.) R. Br. ex Roem & Schult.
- Myrsine umbellata Mart.
- Rapanea ferruginea (Ruiz et Pav.) Mez
- Rapanea guianensis (Aubl.) Kuntze
- Rapanea lancifolia (Mart.) Mez
- Rapanea oblonga Pohl
- Rapanea umbellata (Mart.) Mez

== Myrtaceae ==
- Calyptranthes clusiaefolia O.Berg
- Calyptranthes lucida Mart. ex DC.
- Campomanesia adamantium Blume
- Campomanesia pubescens (DC.) O.Berg
- Campomanesia velutina (Cambess.) O.Berg
- Eugenia aurata O.Berg
- Eugenia bimarginata DC.
- Eugenia blastantha (O.Berg) D.Legrand
- Eugenia cerasiflora Miq.
- Eugenia dysenterica DC.
- Eugenia hiemalis Cambess.
- Eugenia klotzschiana O.Berg
- Eugenia kunthiana DC.
- Eugenia livida O.Berg
- Eugenia pitanga (O.Berg ex Mart.) Kiaersk.
- Eugenia pluriflora Mart.
- Eugenia punicifolia (Kunth) DC.
- Eugenia racemulosa O.Berg
- Eugenia uruguayensis Cambess.
- Myrcia albo-tomentosa DC.
- Myrcia bella Cambess.
- Myrcia castrensis (O.Berg) D.Legrand
- Myrcia fallax DC.
- Myrcia formosiana DC.
- Myrcia guayavaefolia O.Berg
- Myrcia laruotheana Cambess.
- Myrcia lasiantha DC.
- Myrcia lingua O.Berg. Mattos et D.Legrand
- Myrcia multiflora (Lam.) DC.
- Myrcia pallens DC.
- Myrcia pruniflora DC.
- Myrcia rostrata DC.
- Myrcia sphaerocarpa DC.
- Myrcia tomentosa DC.
- Myrcia uberavensis O.Berg
- Myrcia venulosa DC.
- Myrciaria ciliolata O.Berg
- Myrciaria delicatula O.Berg
- Psidium australe Cambess.
- Psidium cinereum Mart.
- Psidium incanescens Mart.

== Myristicaceae ==
- Virola sebifera Aubl.

== Nyctaginaceae ==
- Neea theifera Oerst.
- Pisonia campestris Netto
- Pisonia tomentosa Casar.

== Orchidaceae ==
- Epidendrum secundum Jacq.

== Ochnaceae ==
- Ouratea castanaefolia Engl.
- Ouratea floribunda (A.St.-Hil.) Engl.
- Ouratea nana (A.St.-Hil.) Engl.
- Ouratea spectabilis (Mart.) Engl.

== Opiliaceae ==
- Agonandra brasiliensis Benth. et Hook.f.

== Passifloraceae ==
- Passiflora kermesina Link & Otto (=Passiflora raddiana DC.)

== Polygalaceae ==
- Bredemeyra floribunda Willd.

== Proteaceae ==
- Roupala brasiliensis Klotzsch
- Roupala gardneri Meisn.
- Roupala heterophylla Pohl
- Roupala lucens Meisn.
- Roupala montana Aubl.

== Rubiaceae ==
- Alibertia concolor (Cham.) K.Schum.
- Alibertia edulis (L.C. Rich.) A.C. Rich.
- Alibertia macrophylla K.Schum.
- Alibertia sessilis (Cham.) K.Schum.
- Amaioua guianensis Aubl.
- Borreria latifolia (Aubl.) K.Schum. var. latifolia f. fockeana (Miq.) Steyerm.
- Rustia formosa (Cham. et Schltdl.) Klotzsch
- Tocoyema formosa (Cham. et Schltdl.) K.Schum.

== Rutaceae ==
- Dictyoloma inanescens DC.
- Zanthoxylum hiemale A.St.-Hil.
- Zanthoxylum rhoifolium Lam.

== Sapindaceae ==
- Cupania zanthoxylloides Cam.
- Dilodendron bipinnatum Radlk.
- Magonia glabrata A.St.-Hil.
- Magonia pubescens A.St.-Hil.

== Sapotaceae ==
- Chrysophyllum marginatum (Hook. et Arn.) Radlk.
- Pouteria ramiflora Radlk.
- Pouteria torta Radlk.

== Solanaceae ==
- Cestrum lanceolatum Miers
- Cestrum sendtnerianum Mart. ex Sendtn.
- Solanum concinnum Schott ex Sendtn.
- Solanum granuloso-leprosum Dunal
- Solanum inaequale Vell.
- Solanum lycocarpum A.St.-Hil.
- Solanum paniculatum L.
- Solanum sisymbrifolium Lam.

== Styracaceae ==
- Styrax camporum Pohl
- Styrax ferrugineus Ness et Mart.
- Styrax martii Seub.
- Styrax pohlii A.DC.

== Symplocaceae ==
- Symplocos celastrinea Mart. ex Miq.
- Symplocos lanceolata (Mart.) A. DC.
- Symplocos nitens (Pohl) Benth.
- Symplocos platyphylla (Pohl) Benth.
- Symplocos pubescens Klotzsch ex Benth.
- Symplocos tenuifolia Brand.
- Symplocos uniflora Benth.

== Tiliaceae ==
- Apeiba tibourbou Aubl.
- Guazuma ulmifolia Lam.
- Luehea candicans Mart.
- Luehea divaricata Mart.
- Luehea grandiflora Mart.
- Luehea paniculata Mart.
- Luehea rufescens A.St.-Hil.
- Luehea uniflora A.St.-Hil.

== Verbenaceae ==
- Aegiphila lhotskiana Cham.
- Aegiphila sellowiana Cham.
- Aegiphila tomentosa Cham.

== Vochysiaceae ==
- Callisthene minor Mart.
- Qualea cordata Spreng.
- Qualea dichotoma (Mart.) Warm.
- Qualea glauca Warm.
- Qualea grandifloa Mart.
- Qualea multiflora Mart.
- Qualea parviflora Mart.
- Salvestia convallariodora A.St.-Hil.
- Vochysia cinnamomea Pohl
- Vochysia discolor Warm.
- Vochysia elliptica Spreng. Mart.
- Vochysia rufa Spreng. Mart.
- Vochysia thyrsoidea Pohl
- Vochysia tucanorum (Spreng.) Mart.

== See also ==
- List of plants of the Amazon rainforest of Brazil
- List of plants of Atlantic Forest vegetation of Brazil
- List of plants of Caatinga vegetation of Brazil
- List of plants of Pantanal vegetation of Brazil
- List of endangered flora of Brazil
