= List of Justicia species =

Justicia is a large, broadly distributed genus of flowering plants in the family Acanthaceae. As of February 2024, there are 917 accepted species in Kew's Plants of the World Online.

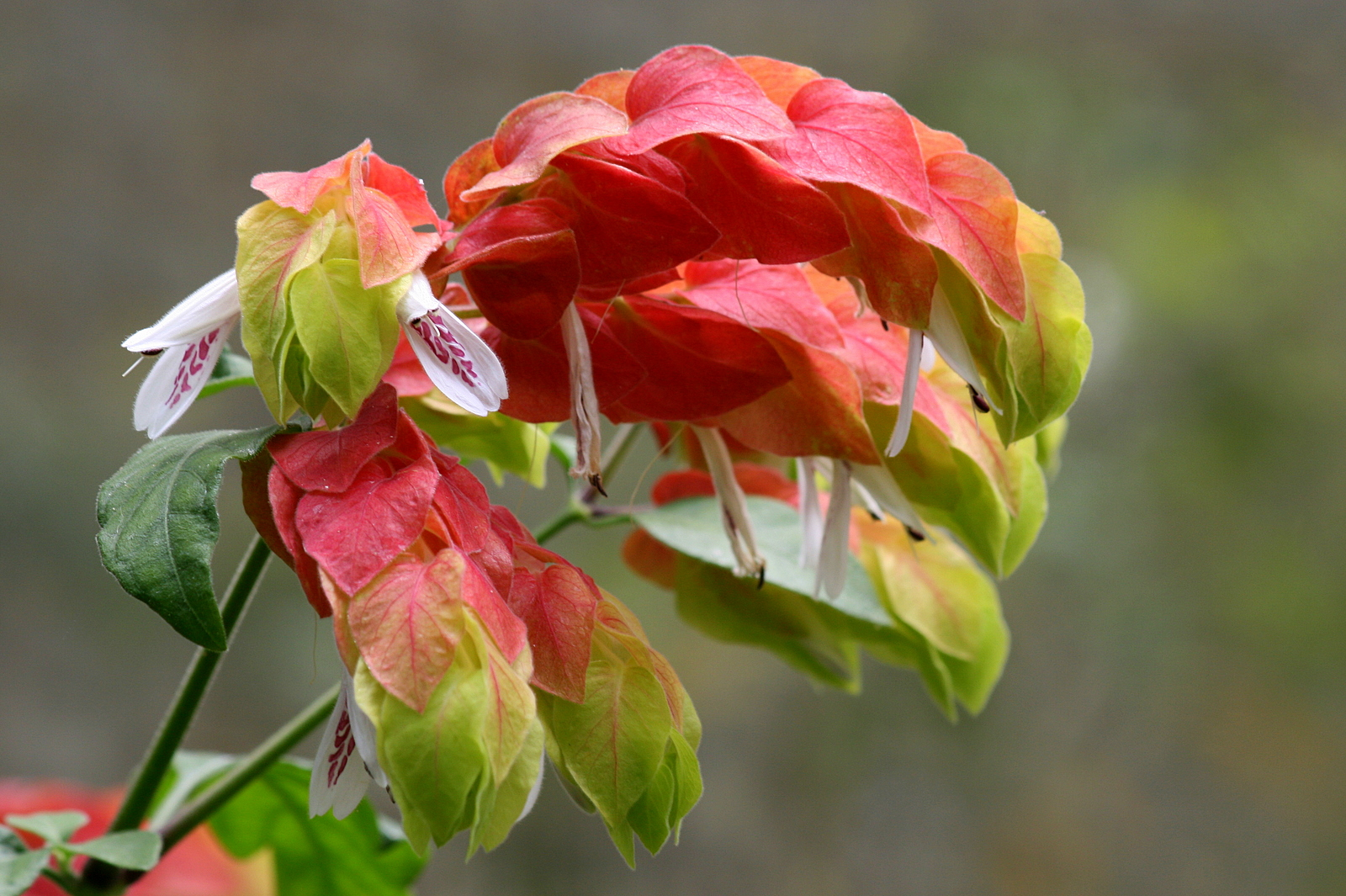
Justicia brandegeeana

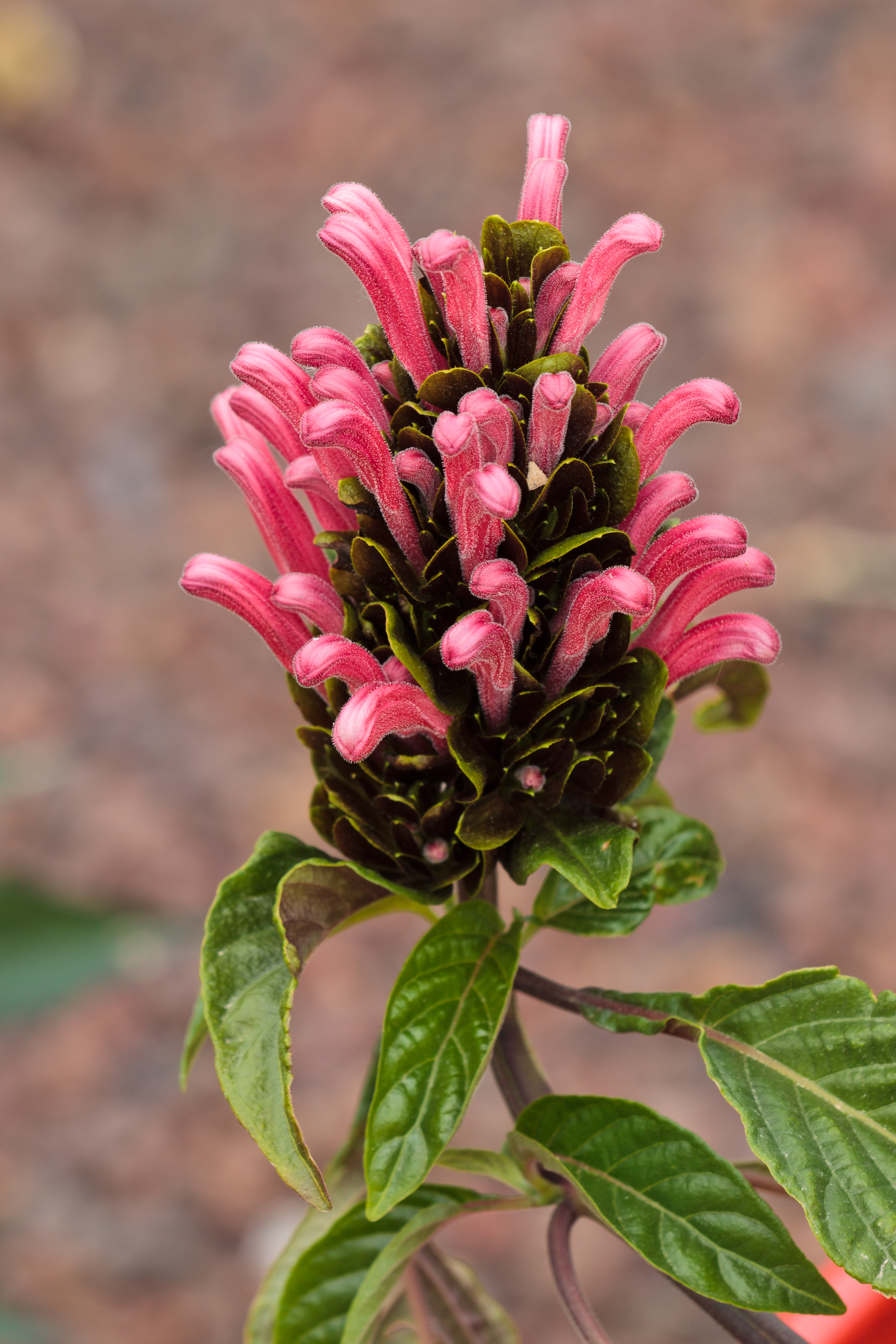
Justicia carnea

== A ==
- Justicia abeggii Urb. & Ekman
- Justicia abscondita Champl.
- Justicia aconitiflora (A.Meeuse) Cubey
- Justicia acuta (C.B.Clarke) Fourc.
- Justicia acutangula H.S.Lo & D.Fang
- Justicia acutifolia Hedrén
- Justicia addisoniensis (Elmer) C.M.Gao & Y.F.Deng
- Justicia adenothyrsa (Lindau) T.F.Daniel
- Justicia adhaerens Wassh. & J.R.I.Wood
- Justicia adhatoda L.
- Justicia adhatodoides (E.Mey. ex Nees) V.A.W.Graham
- Justicia aequalis Benoist
- Justicia aequilabris (Nees) Lindau
- Justicia aequiloculata Benoist
- Justicia aethes Leonard
- Justicia afromontana Hedrén
- Justicia agria Alain & Leonard
- Justicia alainii Stearn
- Justicia alanae T.F.Daniel
- Justicia albadenia (Rusby) Wassh. & J.R.I.Wood
- Justicia albobractea Leonard
- Justicia albovelata W.W.Sm.
- Justicia alboviridis Benoist
- Justicia alchorneeticola Champl.
- Justicia alexandri R.Atk.
- Justicia allenii (Leonard) Durkee
- Justicia almedae T.F.Daniel
- Justicia alopecuroidea T.F.Daniel
- Justicia alpina Lindau
- Justicia alsinoides Leonard
- Justicia alterniflora Vollesen
- Justicia alternifolia C.B.Clarke
- Justicia altior Kiel & Hammel
- Justicia amanda Hedrén
- Justicia amazonica (Nees) Lindau
- Justicia amblyosepala D.Fang & H.S.Lo
- Justicia amherstia Bennet
- Justicia amphibola (Leonard) J.R.I.Wood
- Justicia amplifolia T.F.Daniel
- Justicia anabasa Leonard
- Justicia anagalloides (Nees) T.Anderson
- Justicia andrographioides C.B.Clarke
- Justicia anfractuosa C.B.Clarke
- Justicia angustata Warb.
- Justicia angustiflora D.N.Gibson
- Justicia anisophylla (Mildbr.) Brummitt
- Justicia anisotoides J.R.I.Wood
- Justicia ankaratrensis Benoist
- Justicia ankazobensis Benoist
- Justicia anselliana (Nees) T.Anderson
- Justicia antirrhina Nees & Mart.
- Justicia antsingensis Benoist
- Justicia aphelandroides (Mildbr.) Wassh.
- Justicia aquatica Benoist
- Justicia arborescens Durkee & McDade
- Justicia arbuscula Benoist
- Justicia archeri Leonard
- Justicia arcuata Wassh. & J.R.I.Wood
- Justicia areysiana Deflers
- Justicia argyrostachya T.Anderson
- Justicia aristeguietae Leonard
- Justicia asclepiadea (Nees) Wassh. & C.Ezcurra
- Justicia aspera (Nees) Y.Tong & Y.F.Deng
- Justicia asystasioides (Lindau) M.E.Steiner
- Justicia atacta Leonard
- Justicia atkinsonii T.Anderson
- Justicia attenuata A.L.A.Côrtes & Rapini
- Justicia attenuifolia Vollesen
- Justicia aurantiimutata Hammel & Gómez-Laur.
- Justicia aurea Schltdl.
- Justicia austroguangxiensis H.S.Lo & D.Fang
- Justicia austrosinensis H.S.Lo & D.Fang
- Justicia axillaris (Nees) Lindau
- Justicia axiologa (Leonard) J.R.I.Wood
- Justicia aymardii Wassh.

== B ==
- Justicia baenitzii (H.J.P.Winkl.) C.Ezcurra
- Justicia bagshawei S.Moore
- Justicia baillonii Scott Elliot
- Justicia bakeri Scott Elliot
- Justicia balansae Lindau
- Justicia balslevii Wassh.
- Justicia baravensis C.B.Clarke
- Justicia bartlettii (Leonard) D.N.Gibson
- Justicia baumii S.Moore
- Justicia beckii Wassh. & J.R.I.Wood
- Justicia beddomei (C.B.Clarke) Bennet
- Justicia beloperonoides Lindau
- Justicia bequaertii De Wild.
- Justicia betonicoides C.B.Clarke
- Justicia bicalcarata Craib
- Justicia birae A.S.Reis, F.A.Silva, A.Gil & Kameyama
- Justicia bitarkarae Gómez-Laur.
- Justicia bizuneshiae Ensermu
- Justicia blackii Leonard
- Justicia blechoides (Lindau) Stearn
- Justicia boaleri Hedrén
- Justicia boerhaaviifolia (Nees) T.Anderson
- Justicia bojeriana (Nees) Baron
- Justicia bolavenensis Y.F.Deng
- Justicia boliviana Rusby
- Justicia boliviensis (Bremek.) V.A.W.Graham
- Justicia bolomboensis De Wild.
- Justicia bolusii C.B.Clarke
- Justicia borrerae (Hemsl.) T.F.Daniel
- Justicia bracteosa (Mildbr.) Leonard
- Justicia bradeana Profice
- Justicia brandbygei Wassh.
- Justicia brandegeeana Wassh. & L.B.Sm.
- Justicia brandisii T.Anderson
- Justicia brasiliana Roth
- Justicia breedlovei T.F.Daniel
- Justicia brenesii (Leonard) D.N.Gibson
- Justicia breteleri Wassh.
- Justicia brevicaulis S.Moore
- Justicia brevipedunculata Ensermu
- Justicia brevipila Hedrén
- Justicia breviracemosa Vollesen
- Justicia brevispica Benoist
- Justicia bridsoniana Vollesen
- Justicia bruneelii De Wild.
- Justicia buchholzii (Lindau) I.Darbysh.
- Justicia buchii Urb.
- Justicia bullata (Nees) Profice
- Justicia burchellii Hiern

== C ==
- Justicia cabrerae Leonard
- Justicia caerulea Forssk.
- Justicia californica (Benth.) D.N.Gibson
- Justicia calliantha Leonard
- Justicia callopsoidea Vollesen
- Justicia caloneura Kurz
- Justicia calyculata Deflers
- Justicia calzadillae J.R.I.Wood
- Justicia camerunensis (Heine) I.Darbysh.
- Justicia campanulata Benoist
- Justicia campechiana Standl.
- Justicia campenonii Benoist
- Justicia campii Wassh.
- Justicia campylostemon (Nees) T.Anderson
- Justicia canbyi Greenm.
- Justicia candida Benoist
- Justicia capensis Thunb.
- Justicia capitata (T.Anderson ex Hook.f.) L.H.Cramer
- Justicia caracasana Jacq.
- Justicia carajensis F.A.Silva, A.Gil & Kameyama
- Justicia cardiochlamys Lindau
- Justicia cardiophylla D.Fang & H.S.Lo
- Justicia carnea Lindl.
- Justicia carthaginensis Jacq.
- Justicia cataractae Leonard
- Justicia catenula Champl.
- Justicia catharinensis Lindau
- Justicia caudatifolia (H.S.Lo & D.Fang) Z.P.Hao, Y.F.Deng & T.F.Daniel
- Justicia cauliflora Durkee
- Justicia ceylanica T.Anderson
- Justicia chacoensis Wassh. & C.Ezcurra
- Justicia chaconii Gómez-Laur.
- Justicia chaetocephala (Mildbr.) Leonard
- Justicia chalaensis Vollesen
- Justicia chalmersii Lindau
- Justicia chamaedryoides (Nees) Wassh. ex A.L.A.Côrtes & P.L.R.Moraes
- Justicia chamaephyton D.N.Gibson
- Justicia chamaeranthemoides (Kuntze) T.F.Daniel
- Justicia chapadensis S.Moore
- Justicia chapana Wassh.
- Justicia chapareensis Wassh. & J.R.I.Wood
- Justicia chaponensis Leonard
- Justicia charadrophila Leonard
- Justicia chimalapensis T.F.Daniel
- Justicia chimboracensis Wassh.
- Justicia chiriquiensis Durkee
- Justicia chlamidocalyx A.L.A.Côrtes & Rapini
- Justicia chlamydocardioides (Mildbr.) R.Villanueva & J.R.I.Wood
- Justicia chloanantha Leonard
- Justicia chloroptera Baker
- Justicia chol T.F.Daniel
- Justicia chrysea Leonard
- Justicia chrysocoma Leonard
- Justicia chrysostephana (Hook.f.) T.F.Daniel
- Justicia chrysotrichoma (Nees) Benth. & Hook.f.
- Justicia chuquisacensis Wassh. & J.R.I.Wood
- Justicia circulibracteata Durkee & McDade
- Justicia ciriloi T.F.Daniel
- Justicia citrina (Wawra) Costa-Lima & E.C.O.Chagas
- Justicia claessensii De Wild.
- Justicia clarkii Wassh.
- Justicia clausseniana (Nees) Profice
- Justicia clinopodium A.Gray ex Greenm.
- Justicia clivalis Wassh.
- Justicia coahuilana T.F.Daniel
- Justicia cobensis Lundell
- Justicia cochinchinensis Benoist
- Justicia colorata (Nees) Wassh.
- Justicia columbiensis (Leonard) V.A.W.Graham
- Justicia concavibracteata Lindau
- Justicia conferta J.C.Manning & Goldblatt
- Justicia congestiflora Benoist
- Justicia congrua Lindau
- Justicia consanguinea (Lindau) Wassh. & C.Ezcurra
- Justicia cooleyi Monach. & Leonard
- Justicia coppenamensis Wassh.
- Justicia cordata T.Anderson
- Justicia cordifolia (Rizzini) Funez & Braz
- Justicia corumbensis (Lindau) Wassh. & C.Ezcurra
- Justicia costaricana Leonard
- Justicia coursii Benoist
- Justicia cowanii Leonard
- Justicia craibii W.W.Sm.
- Justicia crassiradix C.B.Clarke
- Justicia crebrinodis Benoist
- Justicia crenata (Leonard) Durkee
- Justicia croceochlamys Leonard
- Justicia cuatrecasasii Wassh.
- Justicia cubana Alain
- Justicia cufodontii (Fiori) Ensermu
- Justicia cuicatlana T.F.Daniel
- Justicia cuixmalensis T.F.Daniel & E.J.Lott
- Justicia culubritae Urb.
- Justicia cuneata Vahl
- Justicia cuneifolia Nees & Mart.
- Justicia cuspidulata (Nees) Wassh.
- Justicia cuzcoensis Lindau
- Justicia cydoniifolia (Nees) Griseb.
- Justicia cymosa (Griff.) Karthik., Moorthy & Karthig.
- Justicia cymulifera T.F.Daniel
- Justicia cynosuroides Benoist
- Justicia cyrtantheriformis (Rizzini) Profice
- Justicia cystolithosa Leonard

== D ==
- Justicia daidalea Leonard
- Justicia dalaensis Benoist
- Justicia dallarii Fiori
- Justicia damingensis (H.S.Lo) H.S.Lo
- Justicia dasycarpa Kurz
- Justicia deaurata Hammel & Gómez-Laur.
- Justicia decaryi Benoist
- Justicia decumbens Craib
- Justicia decurrens J.B.Imlay
- Justicia decurvata Hilsenb.
- Justicia decussata Roxb.
- Justicia dejecta Benoist
- Justicia delascioi Wassh.
- Justicia delicatula Scott Elliot
- Justicia dendropila T.F.Daniel
- Justicia densibracteata Durkee & McDade
- Justicia densiflora (Oerst.) V.A.W.Graham
- Justicia diacantha J.B.Imlay
- Justicia diclipteroides Lindau
- Justicia diminuta Benoist
- Justicia disjuncta Benoist
- Justicia dispar Merr.
- Justicia disparifolia Urb. & Ekman
- Justicia distichophylla F.A.Silva, A.Gil & Kameyama
- Justicia distincta J.B.Imlay
- Justicia divergens (Nees) A.S.Reis, A.Gil & Kameyama
- Justicia diversifolia Jenn.
- Justicia dives Benoist
- Justicia drummondii Vollesen
- Justicia dryadum Wassh. & J.R.I.Wood
- Justicia dubiosa Lindau
- Justicia dumetorum Morong
- Justicia dumosa Alain
- Justicia durangensis (Henrickson & Hilsenb.) T.F.Daniel
- Justicia dusenii (Lindau) Wassh. & L.B.Sm.

== E ==
- Justicia eburnea D.N.Gibson
- Justicia edgarcabrerae T.F.Daniel, Carnevali & Tapia
- Justicia effusa D.N.Gibson
- Justicia ekakusuma Pradeep & Sivar.
- Justicia elegantissima (Lindau) Wassh.
- Justicia elegantula S.Moore
- Justicia elliotii S.Moore
- Justicia enarthrocoma Leonard
- Justicia engleriana Lindau
- Justicia ensiflora (Standl.) D.N.Gibson
- Justicia ephemera Leonard
- Justicia equestris Benoist
- Justicia erythrantha Leonard
- Justicia espiritosantensis Aoyama & Indriunas
- Justicia euosmia Lindau
- Justicia excalcea Benoist
- Justicia exigua S.Moore
- Justicia exsul Benoist
- Justicia extensa T.Anderson

== F ==
- Justicia falconensis Wassh.
- Justicia faulknerae Vollesen
- Justicia ferruginea H.S.Lo & D.Fang
- Justicia filibracteolata Lindau
- Justicia fimbriata (Nees) V.A.W.Graham
- Justicia flaccida Kurz
- Justicia flagelliformis C.B.Clarke
- Justicia flava (Forssk.) Vahl
- Justicia flavescens Rueangs. & Chantar.
- Justicia flaviflora (Turrill) Wassh.
- Justicia floribunda (K.Koch) Wassh.
- Justicia flosculosa Profice
- Justicia fortunensis T.F.Daniel & Wassh.
- Justicia francoiseana Brummitt
- Justicia fuchsiifolia Leonard
- Justicia fuentesii J.R.I.Wood
- Justicia fulvicoma Schltdl. & Cham.
- Justicia fulvohirsuta (Rizzini) Profice
- Justicia funckii Lindau
- Justicia fusagasugana Leonard

== G ==
- Justicia galapagana Lindau ex B.L.Rob.
- Justicia galeata Hedrén
- Justicia gardineri Turrill
- Justicia gendarussa Burm.f.
- Justicia genistifolia Engl.
- Justicia genuflexa Nees & Mart.
- Justicia gesneriflora Rendle
- Justicia gibsoniae Bennet & Sum.Chandra
- Justicia gigantophylla (Lindau) H.J.Sm. & C.Moran
- Justicia gilbertii Vollesen
- Justicia gilliesii (Nees) Benth. & Hook.f. ex Griseb.
- Justicia gladiatotheca Champl.
- Justicia glauca Rottler
- Justicia glaziovii Lindau
- Justicia glischrantha Lindau
- Justicia glomerulata Benoist
- Justicia glutinosa (Bremek.) V.A.W.Graham
- Justicia goianiensis Profice
- Justicia gonzalezii (Greenm.) Henrickson & Hiriart
- Justicia gorongozana Vollesen
- Justicia goudotii V.A.W.Graham
- Justicia graciliflora (Standl.) D.N.Gibson
- Justicia grandifolia T.Anderson
- Justicia graphocaula J.B.Imlay
- Justicia graphophylla Leonard
- Justicia griffithii T.Anderson
- Justicia grisea C.B.Clarke
- Justicia grossa C.B.Clarke
- Justicia guerkeana Schinz
- Justicia guineensis (Heine) W.D.Hawth.
- Justicia gunnari Wassh.
- Justicia gutierrezii Leonard

== H ==
- Justicia hainanensis (C.Y.Wu & H.S.Lo) N.H.Xia & Y.F.Deng
- Justicia harleyi Wassh.
- Justicia harlingii (Wassh.) Wassh.
- Justicia hassleri (Lindau) V.A.W.Graham
- Justicia hatschbachii (Rizzini) Wassh. & L.B.Sm.
- Justicia haughtii (Leonard) J.R.I.Wood
- Justicia hedrenii J.-P.Lebrun & Stork
- Justicia helonoma Leonard
- Justicia henricksonii T.F.Daniel
- Justicia hepperi Heine
- Justicia herpetacanthoides Leonard
- Justicia heterocarpa T.Anderson
- Justicia heterophylla Schltdl.
- Justicia heterosepala Benoist
- Justicia heterotricha Mildbr.
- Justicia hians (Brandegee) Brandegee
- Justicia hilaris Scott Elliot
- Justicia hilsenbeckii T.F.Daniel
- Justicia hintoniorum G.L.Nesom
- Justicia hirsuta Span.
- Justicia hochreutineri J.F.Macbr.
- Justicia hodgei Leonard
- Justicia holgueri Wassh.
- Justicia homblei De Wild.
- Justicia homoea Leonard
- Justicia hookeriana T.Anderson
- Justicia huacanensis T.F.Daniel & V.W.Steinm.
- Justicia huambensis Hedrén
- Justicia huberi Wassh.
- Justicia huilensis (Leonard) J.R.I.Wood
- Justicia humblotii Benoist
- Justicia hunzikeri Ariza
- Justicia hygrobia Leonard
- Justicia hygrophiloides F.Muell.
- Justicia hylaea Leonard
- Justicia hylobia Leonard
- Justicia hylophila Lindau
- Justicia hyperdasya Leonard
- Justicia hyssopifolia L.

== I ==
- Justicia ianthina Wassh.
- Justicia idiogenes Leonard
- Justicia ilhensis (Moric. ex Nees) A.L.A.Côrtes
- Justicia iltisii Wassh.
- Justicia imlayae B.Hansen
- Justicia inaequifolia Brummitt
- Justicia inamoena Benoist
- Justicia infelix Leonard
- Justicia inficiens Vahl
- Justicia ingrata Benoist
- Justicia insolita Brandegee
- Justicia insularis T.Anderson
- Justicia internodialis B.Hansen
- Justicia involucrata (Nees) Leonard
- Justicia iochila Mildbr.
- Justicia irumuensis (Lindau) Bamps & Champl.
- Justicia irwinii Wassh.
- Justicia ischnorhachis Leonard
- Justicia israelvargasii Wassh. & J.R.I.Wood
- Justicia isthmensis T.F.Daniel
- Justicia itatiaiensis Profice
- Justicia ivohibensis Benoist
- Justicia ixodes Leonard
- Justicia ixtlania T.F.Daniel

== J ==
- Justicia jacobinioides Leonard
- Justicia jacuipensis A.L.A.Côrtes & Rapini
- Justicia jamaicensis (Britton) Stearn
- Justicia jamisonii Jongkind & Vollesen
- Justicia japurensis Profice
- Justicia jitotolana T.F.Daniel
- Justicia johannae Benoist
- Justicia jujuyensis C.Ezcurra

== K ==
- Justicia kampotiana Benoist
- Justicia kanal T.F.Daniel
- Justicia karsticola T.F.Daniel
- Justicia kempeana F.Muell.
- Justicia keriana Sweet
- Justicia kerrii J.B.Imlay
- Justicia kessleri Wassh. & J.R.I.Wood
- Justicia kiborianensis (Hedrén) Vollesen
- Justicia killipii Leonard
- Justicia kirkbridei Wassh.
- Justicia kirkiana T.Anderson
- Justicia kiwuensis Mildbr.
- Justicia kleinii Wassh. & L.B.Sm.
- Justicia kouytcheensis (H.Lév.) E.Hossain
- Justicia kucharii Hedrén
- Justicia kuestera V.A.W.Graham
- Justicia kulalensis Vollesen
- Justicia kunhardtii Leonard
- Justicia kuntzei Lindau
- Justicia kurzii C.B.Clarke
- Justicia kwangsiensis (H.S.Lo) H.S.Lo

== L ==
- Justicia ladanoides Lam.
- Justicia lamprophylla Leonard
- Justicia lanstyakii Rizzini
- Justicia laotica Benoist
- Justicia larsenii Rueangs. & Chantar.
- Justicia latiflora Hemsl.
- Justicia lavandulifolia (Nees) Pohl ex Nees
- Justicia laxa T.Anderson
- Justicia lazarus S.Moore
- Justicia leikipiensis S.Moore
- Justicia lenticellata Champl.
- Justicia leonardii Wassh.
- Justicia lepida (Nees) Wassh.
- Justicia leptochlamys Leonard
- Justicia leptophylla Leonard
- Justicia leptostachya Hemsl.
- Justicia leucerythra Leonard
- Justicia leucoesthes Benoist
- Justicia leucostachya (Bremek.) V.A.W.Graham
- Justicia leucothamna (Standl.) T.F.Daniel, Carnevali & Tapia
- Justicia leucoxiphus Vollesen, Cheek & Ghogue
- Justicia lianshanica (H.S.Lo) H.S.Lo
- Justicia lilloana Ariza
- Justicia lilloi (J.L.Lotti) C.Ezcurra
- Justicia linaria T.Anderson
- Justicia linearis B.L.Rob. & Greenm.
- Justicia linearispica C.B.Clarke
- Justicia lineolata Ruiz & Pav.
- Justicia linifolia (Lindau) V.A.W.Graham
- Justicia lithospermoides Lindau
- Justicia littoralis J.R.I.Wood
- Justicia lobata Benoist
- Justicia loheri C.B.Clarke
- Justicia longiacuminata Rusby
- Justicia longii Hilsenb.
- Justicia longipetiolata Y.Tong & Y.F.Deng
- Justicia longula Benoist
- Justicia lorata Ensermu
- Justicia loretensis Lindau
- Justicia lovoiensis Champl.
- Justicia loxensis Wassh.
- Justicia lucindae T.F.Daniel & V.W.Steinm.
- Justicia lugoi Wassh.
- Justicia lukei Vollesen
- Justicia lundellii Leonard
- Justicia luschnathii Lindau
- Justicia luzmariae T.F.Daniel, Carnevali & Tapia
- Justicia lythroides (Nees) V.A.W.Graham

== M ==
- Justicia macarenensis Leonard
- Justicia macrantha Benth.
- Justicia madagascariensis Lindau
- Justicia madrensis T.F.Daniel
- Justicia magdalenensis J.R.I.Wood
- Justicia maguirei Wassh.
- Justicia maingayi C.B.Clarke
- Justicia malacophylla Leonard
- Justicia mandonii (Lindau) Wassh. & C.Ezcurra
- Justicia manserichensis Wassh.
- Justicia mariae Hedrén
- Justicia marojejiensis Benoist
- Justicia martiana (Nees) Lindau
- Justicia martinsoniana R.A.Howard
- Justicia masiaca T.F.Daniel
- Justicia matammensis (Schweinf.) Oliv.
- Justicia matogrossensis Wassh.
- Justicia matudae T.F.Daniel
- Justicia maxima (Lindau) S.Moore
- Justicia maya T.F.Daniel
- Justicia mbalaensis Vollesen
- Justicia mcdadeana A.S.Reis, A.Gil & Kameyama
- Justicia mcdowellii Wassh.
- Justicia mckenleyi Proctor
- Justicia mediocris Benoist
- Justicia medranoi Henrickson & Hiriart
- Justicia megalantha Wassh. & J.R.I.Wood
- Justicia mendax (Lindau) Wassh.
- Justicia mendoncae Benoist
- Justicia mesetarum Wassh. & J.R.I.Wood
- Justicia metallica Lindau
- Justicia metallicorum S.Moore
- Justicia metallorum P.A.Duvign.
- Justicia mexiae T.F.Daniel
- Justicia meyeniana (Nees) Lindau
- Justicia micrantha Wall. ex C.B.Clarke
- Justicia microcarpa Ridl.
- Justicia microthyrsa Vollesen
- Justicia migeodii (S.Moore) V.A.W.Graham
- Justicia miguelii V.A.W.Graham
- Justicia minensis Profice
- Justicia minima A.Meeuse
- Justicia minutiflora Benoist
- Justicia minutifolia Chiov.
- Justicia mirabiloides Lam.
- Justicia mirandae T.F.Daniel
- Justicia mkungweensis Vollesen
- Justicia modesta (Bremek.) V.A.W.Graham
- Justicia mogandjoensis De Wild.
- Justicia mollugo C.B.Clarke
- Justicia monachinoi Wassh.
- Justicia monopleurantha (Lindau) Wassh.
- Justicia montealegrensis F.A.Silva & Kameyama
- Justicia monticola (Nees) Profice
- Justicia montis-salinarum A.Meeuse
- Justicia moretiana Burm.f.
- Justicia moritziana Wassh.
- Justicia morona-santiagoensis Wassh.
- Justicia mossambicensis Lindau
- Justicia multibracteata Benoist
- Justicia multicaulis Donn.Sm.
- Justicia multiglandulosa F.A.Silva & Kameyama
- Justicia myuros Benoist

== N ==
- Justicia namatophila Leonard
- Justicia nana (Nees) Lindau
- Justicia nanofrutex Champl.
- Justicia neesiana (Nees) Wall. ex T.Anderson
- Justicia nelsonii (Greenm.) T.F.Daniel
- Justicia nematocalix Lindau
- Justicia nemorosa Sw.
- Justicia neomontana Bennet & Sum.Chandra
- Justicia nervata (Lindau) Profice
- Justicia neurantha Collett & Hemsl.
- Justicia neurochlamys Leonard
- Justicia nevlingii Wassh. & T.F.Daniel
- Justicia niassensis Vollesen
- Justicia nicaraguensis Durkee
- Justicia nigerica S.Moore
- Justicia niokolo-kobae Berhaut
- Justicia nkandlaensis (Immelman) J.C.Manning & Goldblatt
- Justicia nodicaulis (Nees) Leonard
- Justicia novogaliciana T.F.Daniel
- Justicia novogranatensis Leonard
- Justicia nummulus Benoist
- Justicia nuriana Wassh.
- Justicia nuttii C.B.Clarke
- Justicia nyassana Lindau

== O ==
- Justicia oaxacana (Greenm.) T.F.Daniel
- Justicia obcordata Benoist
- Justicia oblongifolia (Lindau) M.E.Steiner
- Justicia obovata Wassh. & J.R.I.Wood
- Justicia obtusicapsula Hedrén
- Justicia ochroleuca Blume
- Justicia odora (Forssk.) Lam.
- Justicia oellgaardii Wassh.
- Justicia oldemanii Wassh.
- Justicia olmeca T.F.Daniel
- Justicia oncodes (Lindau) Wassh. & C.Ezcurra
- Justicia onilahensis Benoist
- Justicia oranensis N.De Marco & Ter.Ruiz
- Justicia orbicularis (Lindau) V.A.W.Graham
- Justicia orchioides L.f.
- Justicia oreadum S.Moore
- Justicia oreophila C.B.Clarke
- Justicia oreopola Leonard
- Justicia ornatopila Ensermu
- Justicia ornithopoda Benoist
- Justicia orosiensis Durkee
- Justicia otophora C.B.Clarke
- Justicia ovalis Ridl.
- Justicia oxypages Leonard

== P ==
- Justicia pacifica (Oerst.) Hemsl.
- Justicia palaciosii Wassh.
- Justicia pallida J.B.Imlay
- Justicia palmeri Rose
- Justicia pampolystachys Leonard
- Justicia panamense Durkee
- Justicia panarensis Wassh.
- Justicia panduriformis Benoist
- Justicia pannieri Leonard
- Justicia parabolica (Nees) Profice
- Justicia paracambi Braz
- Justicia parahyba P.L.R.Moraes
- Justicia parguazensis Wassh.
- Justicia parimensis Wassh.
- Justicia paruana Wassh.
- Justicia parvibracteata Leonard
- Justicia paspaloides Benoist
- Justicia pastazana Wassh.
- Justicia patentiflora Hemsl.
- Justicia pathanamthittiensis Remadevi & Binoj Kumar
- Justicia paucifolia T.F.Daniel
- Justicia paucinervis Benoist
- Justicia pectoralis Jacquin
- Justicia pedemontana Champl.
- Justicia pedestris Benoist
- Justicia pedicellata D.N.Gibson
- Justicia pedropalensis J.R.I.Wood
- Justicia pelianthia Leonard
- Justicia peninsularis Gómez-Laur. & Hammel
- Justicia peratanthoides Urb. & Ekman
- Justicia periplocifolia Jacq.
- Justicia perrieri Kottaim.
- Justicia petiolaris E.Mey.
- Justicia petraea Leonard
- Justicia petterssonii (Hedrén) Vollesen
- Justicia phaeocarpa (Nees) Costa-Lima & E.C.O.Chagas
- Justicia pharmacodes Leonard
- Justicia phillipsiae Rendle
- Justicia phlebodes Leonard & Gentry
- Justicia phlebophylla Leonard
- Justicia phlomoides Mildbr.
- Justicia phyllocalyx (Lindau) Wassh. & C.Ezcurra
- Justicia phyllostachys C.B.Clarke
- Justicia physogaster Lindau
- Justicia phytolaccoides Leonard
- Justicia piauhiensis (Nees) V.A.W.Graham
- Justicia pilosa (Nees) Lindau
- Justicia pilosella (Nees) Hilsenb.
- Justicia pilosocordata C.B.Clarke
- Justicia pilosula Benoist
- Justicia pilzii T.F.Daniel
- Justicia pinensis S.Moore
- Justicia pinguior C.B.Clarke
- Justicia pittieri Lindau
- Justicia platysepala (S.Moore) P.G.Mey.
- Justicia plebeia Benoist
- Justicia plowmanii Wassh.
- Justicia plumbaginifolia J.Jacq.
- Justicia pluriformis Wassh. & J.R.I.Wood
- Justicia poeppigiana (Nees) Lindau
- Justicia poggei Lindau
- Justicia pohliana Profice
- Justicia poilanei Benoist
- Justicia polita (Nees) Profice
- Justicia polyantha Benoist
- Justicia polygonoides Kunth
- Justicia polystachya Lam.
- Justicia porphyrocoma Leonard
- Justicia potamogeton Lindau
- Justicia potamophila Lindau
- Justicia potarensis (Bremek.) Wassh.
- Justicia pozuzoensis Wassh.
- Justicia prachuapensis Rueangs. & Chantar.
- Justicia preussii (Lindau) C.B.Clarke
- Justicia prevostiae Wassh.
- Justicia prietori Wassh.
- Justicia pringlei B.L.Rob.
- Justicia prominens Benoist
- Justicia protracta T.Anderson
- Justicia pseudoamazonica Lindau
- Justicia pseudohypoestes Benoist
- Justicia pseudorungia Lindau
- Justicia pseudospicata H.S.Lo & D.Fang
- Justicia pseudotenella Champl.
- Justicia puberula Immelman
- Justicia pubiflora C.B.Clarke
- Justicia pubigera (Nees) Wall. ex C.B.Clarke
- Justicia pulgarensis (Elmer) C.M.Gao & Y.F.Deng
- Justicia purpusii (Brandegee) D.N.Gibson
- Justicia pycnophylla Lindau
- Justicia pygmaea Lindau
- Justicia pynaertii De Wild.
- Justicia pyrrhostachya (Lindau) Wassh.

== Q ==
- Justicia quadrifaria (Nees) T.Anderson

== R ==
- Justicia racemulosa Wikstr.
- Justicia radicans Vahl
- Justicia ramulosa (Morong) C.Ezcurra
- Justicia rauhii Wassh.
- Justicia readii T.F.Daniel & Wassh.
- Justicia rectiflora (Lindau) V.A.W.Graham
- Justicia refractifolia (Kuntze) Leonard
- Justicia refulgens Leonard
- Justicia reginaldii Wassh.
- Justicia regis Hedrén
- Justicia regnellii Lindau
- Justicia reisensis Rusby
- Justicia reitzii Leonard
- Justicia remotifolia Ridl.
- Justicia rendlei C.B.Clarke
- Justicia reptabunda Benoist
- Justicia rhodantha Benoist
- Justicia rhodesiana S.Moore
- Justicia rhodoides Leonard
- Justicia rhodoptera Baker
- Justicia rhomboidea Wassh. & J.R.I.Wood
- Justicia richardii Benoist
- Justicia richardsiae Hedrén
- Justicia rictus Benoist
- Justicia riedeliana (Nees) V.A.W.Graham
- Justicia rigens Benoist
- Justicia rigida Balf.f.
- Justicia riojana Lindau
- Justicia riopalenquensis Wassh.
- Justicia riparia Kameyama
- Justicia robertii V.A.W.Graham
- Justicia robinsonii Ridl.
- Justicia rodgersii Vollesen
- Justicia rohrii Vahl
- Justicia roigii Britton ex Alain
- Justicia romba Benoist
- Justicia roseopunctata (Ridl.) Ridl. ex S.Moore
- Justicia rothschuhii (Lindau) Durkee
- Justicia rubicunda (Hochst.) Fourc.
- Justicia rubriflora Wassh. & J.R.I.Wood
- Justicia rubrobracteata Alcantara & G.Soares
- Justicia rubropicta Benoist
- Justicia rubroviolacea Benoist
- Justicia ruiziana Lindau
- Justicia rupestris Ridl.
- Justicia rusbyana Lindau
- Justicia rusbyi (Lindau) V.A.W.Graham
- Justicia ruwenzoriensis C.B.Clarke
- Justicia rzedowskii (Acosta) T.F.Daniel

== S ==
- Justicia sabulicola Benoist
- Justicia saksuwaniae Rueangs. & Chantar.
- Justicia salasiae T.F.Daniel & E.J.Lott
- Justicia salicifolia T.Anderson
- Justicia salma-margaritae Acosta
- Justicia salsoloides T.Anderson
- Justicia saltensis Ter.Ruiz & N.De Marco
- Justicia salvadorensis Standl.
- Justicia salviiflora Kunth
- Justicia salvioides Milne-Redh.
- Justicia sambiranensis Benoist
- Justicia sanchezioides Leonard
- Justicia sangilensis T.F.Daniel & Véliz
- Justicia santapaui Bennet
- Justicia santelisiana Acosta & T.F.Daniel
- Justicia sarapiquensis McDade
- Justicia sarmentosa (Nees) Lindau
- Justicia sarothroides Lindau
- Justicia saxatilis (Munday) J.C.Manning & Goldblatt
- Justicia scabrida S.Moore
- Justicia scandens Vahl
- Justicia scansilis (Rizzini) V.A.W.Graham
- Justicia scheidweileri V.A.W.Graham
- Justicia schenckiana Lindau
- Justicia schimperiana T.Anderson
- Justicia schneideri Leonard
- Justicia schoensis Lindau
- Justicia schomburgkiana (Nees) V.A.W.Graham
- Justicia schultesii Leonard
- Justicia sciera Leonard
- Justicia sciota Leonard
- Justicia scortechinii C.B.Clarke
- Justicia scutifera Champl.
- Justicia scytophylla Leonard
- Justicia sebastianopolitanae Profice
- Justicia seclusa Benoist
- Justicia segoviaensis P.Soumya & Sunojk.
- Justicia sejuncta Champl.
- Justicia sellowiana Profice
- Justicia senicula Benoist
- Justicia sericea Ruiz & Pav.
- Justicia sericiflora Benoist
- Justicia serotina (P.G.Mey.) J.C.Manning & Goldblatt
- Justicia serrana Kameyama
- Justicia seslerioides S.Moore
- Justicia sessilifolia (Lindau) Wassh.
- Justicia siccanea W.W.Sm.
- Justicia silvicola D.N.Gibson
- Justicia simonisia V.A.W.Graham
- Justicia simplex D.Don
- Justicia siraensis Wassh.
- Justicia sitiens Benoist
- Justicia sivadasanii Sunil, K.M.P.Kumar & Naveen Kum.
- Justicia skutchii Leonard
- Justicia soliana Standl.
- Justicia sonorae Wassh.
- Justicia soukupii (Standl. & F.A.Barkley) V.A.W.Graham
- Justicia sphaerosperma Vahl
- Justicia spicigera Schltdl.
- Justicia spinigera Urb. & Ekman
- Justicia spinosissima Alain
- Justicia sprucei V.A.W.Graham
- Justicia squarrosa Griseb.
- Justicia stachytarphetoides (Lindau) C.B.Clarke
- Justicia stearnii V.A.W.Graham
- Justicia steinbachiorum Wassh. & J.R.I.Wood
- Justicia stellata (B.L.Rob. & Greenm.) T.F.Daniel
- Justicia stenophylla Urb. & Britton
- Justicia sterea Leonard
- Justicia stereostachya Leonard
- Justicia steyermarkii Standl. & Leonard
- Justicia stipitata Wassh. & Arroyo
- Justicia straminea D.N.Gibson
- Justicia striata (Klotzsch) Bullock
- Justicia strigilis Benoist
- Justicia striolata Mildbr.
- Justicia suarezensis Benoist
- Justicia subalternans C.B.Clarke
- Justicia subcordatifolia Vollesen & I.Darbysh.
- Justicia subcoriacea Ridl.
- Justicia subcymosa C.B.Clarke
- Justicia subpaniculata Benoist
- Justicia sulitii Y.Tong & Y.F.Deng
- Justicia sulphuriflora Hedrén
- Justicia sumatrana (Miq.) Kurz
- Justicia suratensis J.B.Imlay
- Justicia symphyantha (Nees) Lindau
- Justicia syncollotheca Milne-Redh.

== T ==
- Justicia takhinensis R.Atk.
- Justicia tanalensis S.Moore
- Justicia tarapotensis Lindau
- Justicia teletheca T.F.Daniel
- Justicia telloensis Hedrén
- Justicia tenera (Turrill) D.N.Gibson
- Justicia tenuiflora Ruiz & Pav.
- Justicia tenuipes S.Moore
- Justicia tenuis Merr.
- Justicia tenuissima J.B.Imlay
- Justicia tenuistachys (Rusby) Wassh. & J.R.I.Wood
- Justicia thailandica Y.F.Deng & Y.Tong
- Justicia thiniophila Ensermu
- Justicia thomensis Lindau
- Justicia thunbergioides (Lindau) Leonard
- Justicia thymifolia (Nees) C.B.Clarke
- Justicia tianguensis T.F.Daniel
- Justicia tigrina Heine
- Justicia tinctoriella Bennet & Raizada
- Justicia tobagensis (Urb.) Wassh.
- Justicia tocantina (Nees) V.A.W.Graham
- Justicia tomentosula (Urb.) Stearn
- Justicia tonduzii Lindau
- Justicia toroensis S.Moore
- Justicia torresii T.F.Daniel
- Justicia totonaca T.F.Daniel
- Justicia tranquebariensis L.f.
- Justicia tremulifolia Lindau
- Justicia trianae (Leonard) J.R.I.Wood
- Justicia trichocarpa J.B.Imlay
- Justicia trichophylla Baker
- Justicia trichotoma (Kuntze) Leonard
- Justicia trifoliata Roem. & Schult.
- Justicia triloba (Lindau) E.C.O.Chagas & Costa-Lima
- Justicia tristis (Nees) T.Anderson
- Justicia trivialis Benoist
- Justicia tubulosa (Nees) T.Anderson
- Justicia tukuchensis V.A.W.Graham
- Justicia turipachensis T.F.Daniel
- Justicia tutukuensis Champl.
- Justicia tuxtlensis T.F.Daniel

== U ==
- Justicia uber C.B.Clarke
- Justicia udzungwaensis Vollesen
- Justicia ukagurensis Hedrén
- Justicia ulei Lindau
- Justicia umbricola Wassh. & J.R.I.Wood
- Justicia unguiculata Leonard
- Justicia unyorensis S.Moore
- Justicia upembensis Hedrén
- Justicia urophylla (Lindau) D.N.Gibson
- Justicia uvida Wassh.
- Justicia uxpanapensis T.F.Daniel

== V ==
- Justicia vagabunda Benoist
- Justicia vagans Collett & Hemsl.
- Justicia valerii Leonard
- Justicia valida Ridl.
- Justicia valvata T.F.Daniel
- Justicia varians (C.B.Clarke) Vollesen
- Justicia vasculosa (Nees) T.Anderson
- Justicia vasculosoides Rueangs. & Chantar.
- Justicia velizii T.F.Daniel
- Justicia venalis Benoist
- Justicia ventricosa Wall. ex Nees
- Justicia venulosa Ridl.
- Justicia veracruzana T.F.Daniel
- Justicia veraguensis T.F.Daniel & Wassh.
- Justicia vernalis Wassh. & J.R.I.Wood
- Justicia vicina Benoist
- Justicia vidalii C.B.Clarke
- Justicia violaceotincta Champl.
- Justicia virescens Ridl.
- Justicia virgata (Nees) T.Anderson
- Justicia viridescens (Leonard) T.F.Daniel
- Justicia viridifavescens Lindau
- Justicia vitzliputzlii Lindau
- Justicia vixspicata Lindau
- Justicia volkeri U.B.Deshmukh & Gnanasek.

== W ==
- Justicia wallnoeferi Wassh.
- Justicia wardii W.W.Sm.
- Justicia warmingii Hiern
- Justicia warnockii B.L.Turner
- Justicia wasshauseniana Profice
- Justicia wasshausenii Kottaim.
- Justicia weberbaueri (Lindau) Wassh.
- Justicia weihongjinii Y.F.Deng, Y.Tong & Y.S.Huang
- Justicia wendtii T.F.Daniel
- Justicia whytei S.Moore
- Justicia wilhelminensis Wassh.
- Justicia williamsii T.F.Daniel
- Justicia wrightii A.Gray
- Justicia wurdackii Leonard
- Justicia wynaadensis (Nees) T.Anderson

== X ==
- Justicia xantholeuca W.W.Sm.
- Justicia xanthostachya Leonard
- Justicia xerobatica W.W.Sm.
- Justicia xipotensis (Schult.) A.L.A.Côrtes & Rapini
- Justicia xylosteoides Griseb.

== Y ==
- Justicia yhuensis Lindau
- Justicia yungensis Wassh. & J.R.I.Wood
- Justicia yunnanensis W.W.Sm.
- Justicia yurimaguensis Lindau
- Justicia yuyoensis Wassh. & J.R.I.Wood

== Z ==
- Justicia zamorensis Wassh.
- Justicia zamudioi T.F.Daniel
- Justicia zapoteca T.F.Daniel
- Justicia zarucchii Wassh.
- Justicia zopilotensis Henrickson & Hiriart
