= Ruellia stenandrium =

Scientific classification
- Kingdom: Plantae
- Clade: Tracheophytes
- Clade: Angiosperms
- Clade: Eudicots
- Clade: Asterids
- Order: Lamiales
- Family: Acanthaceae
- Genus: Ruellia
- Species: R. stenandrium

Binomial name
- Ruellia stenandrium Pohl ex Nees

Species of flowering plant

Ruellia stenandrium is a plant native to the Cerrado vegetation of Brazil.
