= Colladon =

Colladon is a surname. Notable people with the surname include:

- Jean-Daniel Colladon (1802–1893), Swiss physicist
- Louis Théodore Frederic Colladon (1792–1862), Swiss physician and botanist
- Nicolas Colladon (c. 1530–1586), French Calvinist pastor
