= Ruellia densa =

Scientific classification
- Kingdom: Plantae
- Clade: Tracheophytes
- Clade: Angiosperms
- Clade: Eudicots
- Clade: Asterids
- Order: Lamiales
- Family: Acanthaceae
- Genus: Ruellia
- Species: R. densa

Binomial name
- Ruellia densa Hiern (1877)

Synonyms
- Siphonacanthus densus Nees (1847)

Species of flowering plant

Ruellia densa is a species of flowering plant in the family Acanthaceae. It is a native to the Cerrado region of central Brazil.

== See also ==
- List of plants of Cerrado vegetation of Brazil
