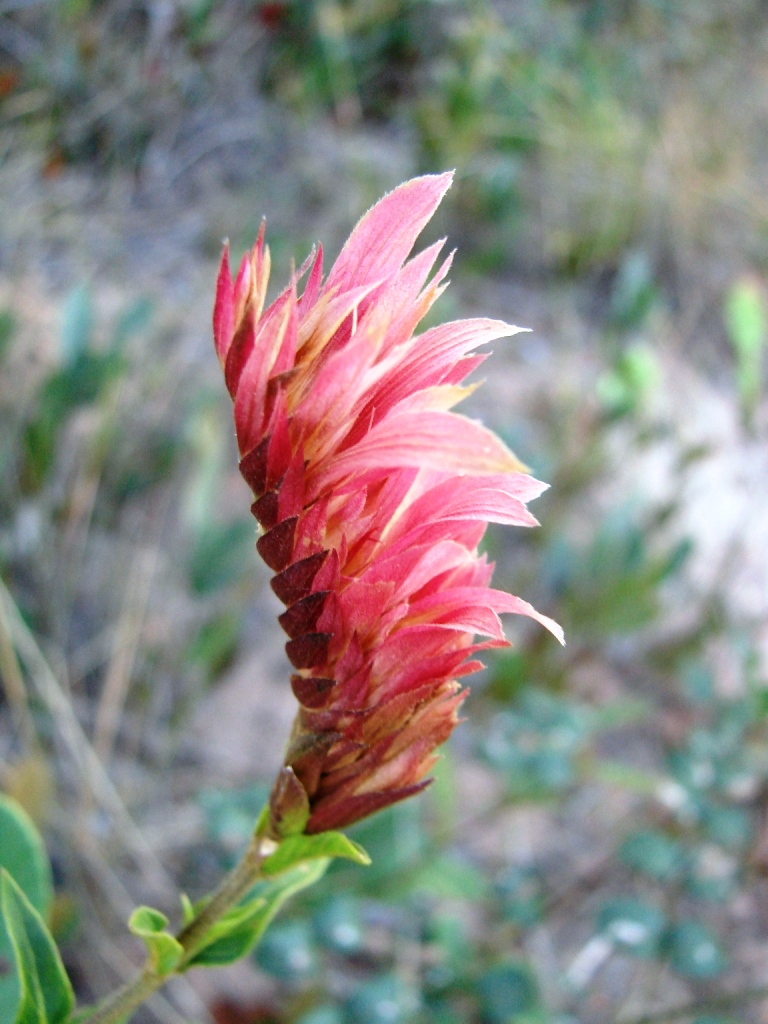

Scientific classification
- Kingdom: Plantae
- Clade: Embryophytes
- Clade: Tracheophytes
- Clade: Angiosperms
- Clade: Eudicots
- Clade: Asterids
- Order: Lamiales
- Family: Acanthaceae
- Genus: Lepidagathis
- Species: L. floribunda

Binomial name
- Lepidagathis floribunda (Pohl) Kameyama (1995)

Synonyms
- Lophostachys bradei Rizzini (1947); Lophostachys floribunda Pohl (1831); Lophostachys floribunda var. laxa Nees (1847)

= Lepidagathis floribunda =

Species of flowering plant

Lepidagathis floribunda is a flowering plant native to the Caatinga and Cerrado vegetation of Brazil and Bolivia. This plant is cited in Flora Brasiliensis by Carl Friedrich Philipp von Martius.
