= Ruellia brevicaulis =

Scientific classification
- Kingdom: Plantae
- Clade: Tracheophytes
- Clade: Angiosperms
- Clade: Eudicots
- Clade: Asterids
- Order: Lamiales
- Family: Acanthaceae
- Genus: Ruellia
- Species: R. brevicaulis

Binomial name
- Ruellia brevicaulis (Nees) Lindau (1895), nom. illeg.

Synonyms
- Dipteracanthus brevicaulis Nees (1847); Dipteracanthus dissitifolius var. humilior Nees (1847)

Species of flowering plant

Ruellia brevicaulis is a species of flowering plant native to Argentina, Brazil, and Paraguay. It is native to the Cerrado vegetation of Brazil.

Plants of the World Online considers the species unplaced, under the name Dipteracanthus brevicaulis.

== See also ==
- List of plants of Cerrado vegetation of Brazil
