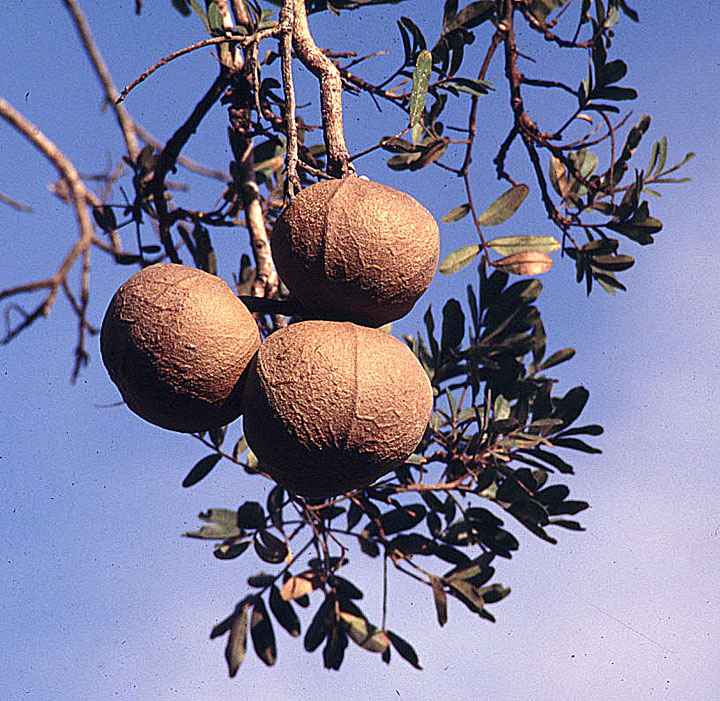
- Magonia pubescens

Scientific classification
- Kingdom: Plantae
- Clade: Tracheophytes
- Clade: Angiosperms
- Clade: Eudicots
- Clade: Rosids
- Order: Sapindales
- Family: Sapindaceae
- Genus: Magonia; A.St.-Hil.
- Species: M. pubescens

Binomial name
- Magonia pubescens A.St.-Hil.

Synonyms
- Magonia glabrata A.St.-Hil.; Phaeocarpus Mart.; Phaeocarpus agrestis Mart.; Phaeocarpus campestris Mart.; Phaeocarpus glabratus (A.St.-Hil.) Spreng.

= Magonia pubescens =

Genus of flowering plants

Magonia A.St.-Hil. is a plant genus in the family Sapindaceae, with a single currently accepted species, Magonia pubescens. It is a tree native to tropical South America, ranging from northern Brazil through Bolivia and Paraguay to northeastern Argentina.

Magonia Vell. is a synonym of Ruprechtia, a genus in the family Polygonaceae.
