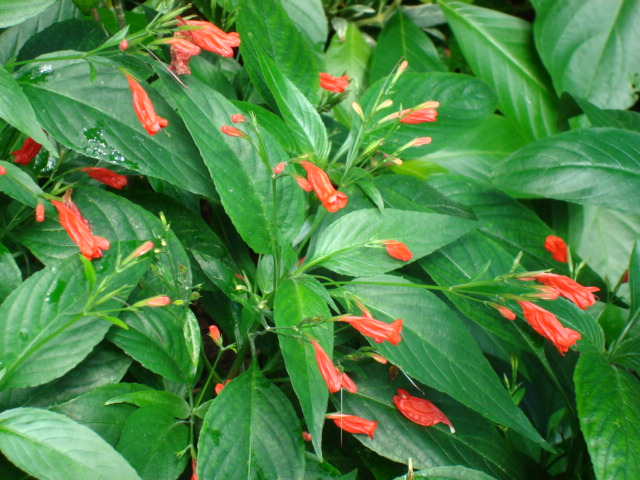

Scientific classification
- Kingdom: Plantae
- Clade: Tracheophytes
- Clade: Angiosperms
- Clade: Eudicots
- Clade: Asterids
- Order: Lamiales
- Family: Acanthaceae
- Genus: Ruellia
- Species: R. brevifolia

Binomial name
- Ruellia brevifolia (Pohl) C. Ezcurra

Synonyms
- Cyrtacanthus corymbosus Echinacanthus dichotomus Ruellia amoena Nees; Ruellia graecizans Backer; Ruellia longifolia Ruellia serratitheca Ruellia ventricosa Stephanophysum brevifolium Stephanophysum longifolium Stephanophysum macrandrum Stephanophysum ventricosum

= Ruellia brevifolia =

Species of plant

Ruellia brevifolia, the tropical wild petunia or red Christmas pride, is an ornamental plant in the family Acanthaceae. It is native to South America, from Colombia to southern Brazil and northern Argentina.
