= Giuseppe Raddi =

Italian botanist and curator

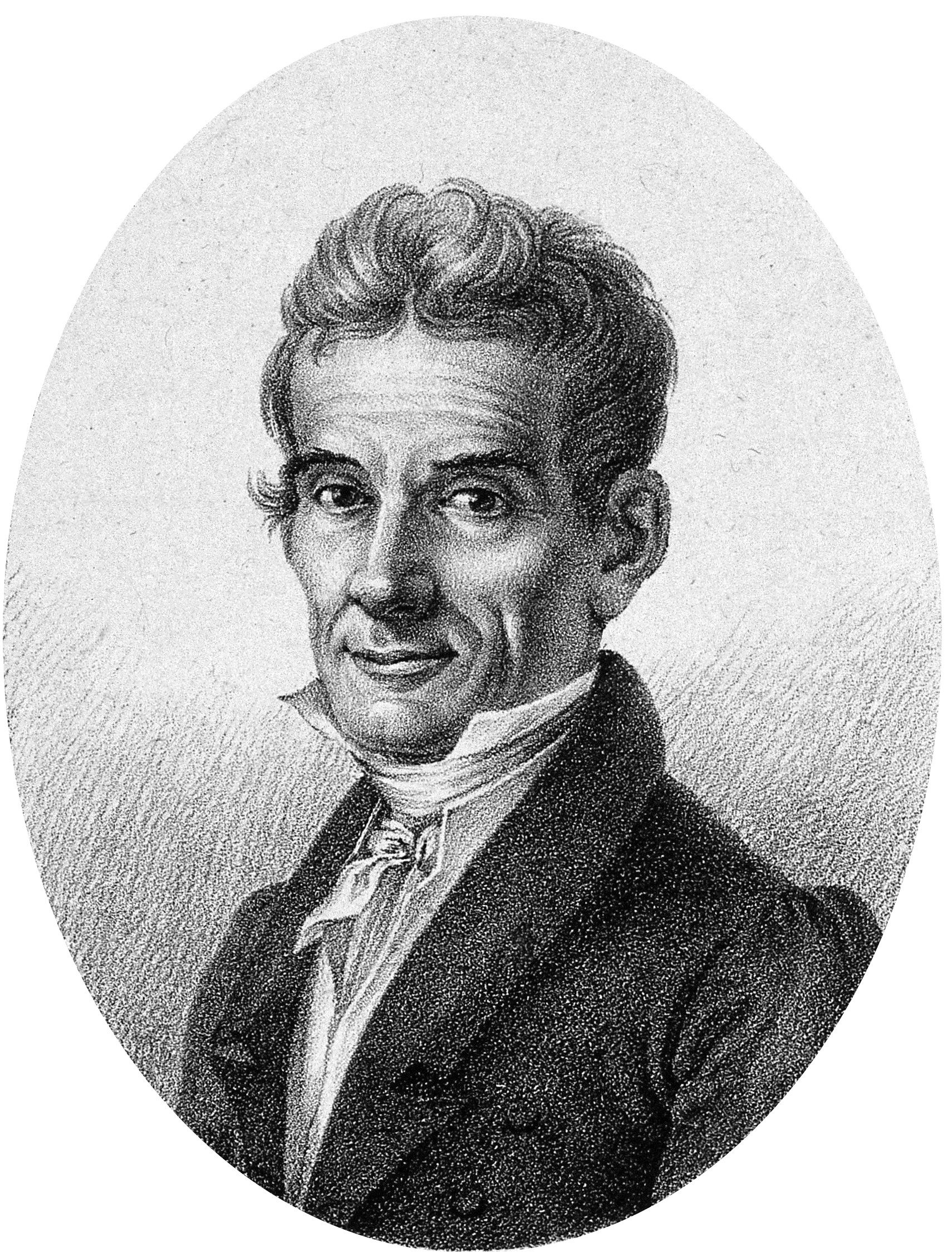
Giuseppe Raddi

Giuseppe Raddi (9 July 1770 in Florence, Grand Duchy of Tuscany – 6 September 1829 the island of Rhodes) was an Italian botanist and curator at the Museum of Natural History of Florence. He was among the first Europeans to explore and document the flora of South and Central America.

== Biography ==
Raddi was born in a poor family to Stefano and Orsola Pandolfini. He worked for a while in a spicery where he got interested in medicinal plants. In 1786 he met Ottaviano Targioni Tozzetti (1755–1826) who introduced him to Gaetano Savi (1769–1844). Raddi took an interest in the seedless plants and the fungi around Florence. He also learned Latin and other languages and began to read works on science and exploration. In 1785 he became an assistant to Attilio Zuccagni who took care of the Botanical Garden of Florence and later obtained employment in the Museum of Natural History of Florence. Raddi took a political position against Napoleon Bonaparte and faced opposition from Count Gerolamo de’ Bardi, a Napoleon supporter who succeeded the museum director Felice Fontana. Raddi remained without employment from 1809 to 1814 but his position was restored after the defeat of Napoleon and was supported by Ferdinand III, Grand Duke of Tuscany. He published a monograph Jungermanniografia Etrusca in 1817 and in the same year he joined on a mission to Brazil that followed on the heels of the marriage of the Archduchess Maria Leopoldina Habsburg-Lorraine with Dom Pedro de Bragança, Crown Prince of Brazil and Portugal. Raddi studied the flora and fauna of the basins of Orinoco and Amazon Rivers, and formed a collection of plants and animals. He published the first flora on the grasses of the Brazilian region in Agrostografia brasiliensis (1823). Raddi collaborated with other botanists including A.P. de Candolle, Franz Wilhelm Sieber, Joseph Antoir, and Carl Bernhard Trinius.

In 1824 Ferdinand III died and his son Leopold II of Tuscany became the Grand Duke and continued the tradition of supporting of scientific research. He appointed Raddi to join the French egyptologist Jean François Champollion along with the Italian egyptologist Ippolito Rossellini. They sailed from Toulon on 31 August 1828 to Alexandria and then on to Cairo and south along the Nile. In June 1829 he suffered from intestinal infection and returned to Cairo. His health got worse and he was forced to move to Alexandria to return to Italy. He died on the island of Rhodes on 6 September 1829 where he was buried in the church of Santa Maria della Vittoria. In 1914 there was an attempt to move his remains to Florence to be buried in the Church of Santa Croce but his body could not be found.

After his death, his wife Laura and five children were forced to sell his botanical collections to support themselves. The collections were purchased by several people leading to it now being spread out across Europe.

Although known mainly as a botanist, Raddi also collected specimens from many taxa and studied reptiles, and from 1820 to 1826 named several new species of reptiles endemic to Brazil.

== Writings ==
His works include Crittogame Brasiliane (2 vols., Florence, 1822) and Plantarum Brasiliensium nova genera et species novae vel minus cognitae in which he described 156 new species of ferns, etc. (1825).
