= Helge Ness =

Norwegian botanist (1861–1928)

Helge Ness (November 4, 1861 – December 30, 1928) was a Norwegian botanist. He was born in Rosendal, Norway.

In 1889, he became the first international student to graduate from Texas A&M University, and began to work at that university. Ness was the first botanist in the United States to produce hybrid oaks.

He became head of the Botanical Division of Texas Agricultural Experiment Station (now Texas AgriLife Research).

Ness was part of a group of botanists at the beginning of the 20th century who studied controlled pollination in trees and pioneered studies of tree hybridization.
