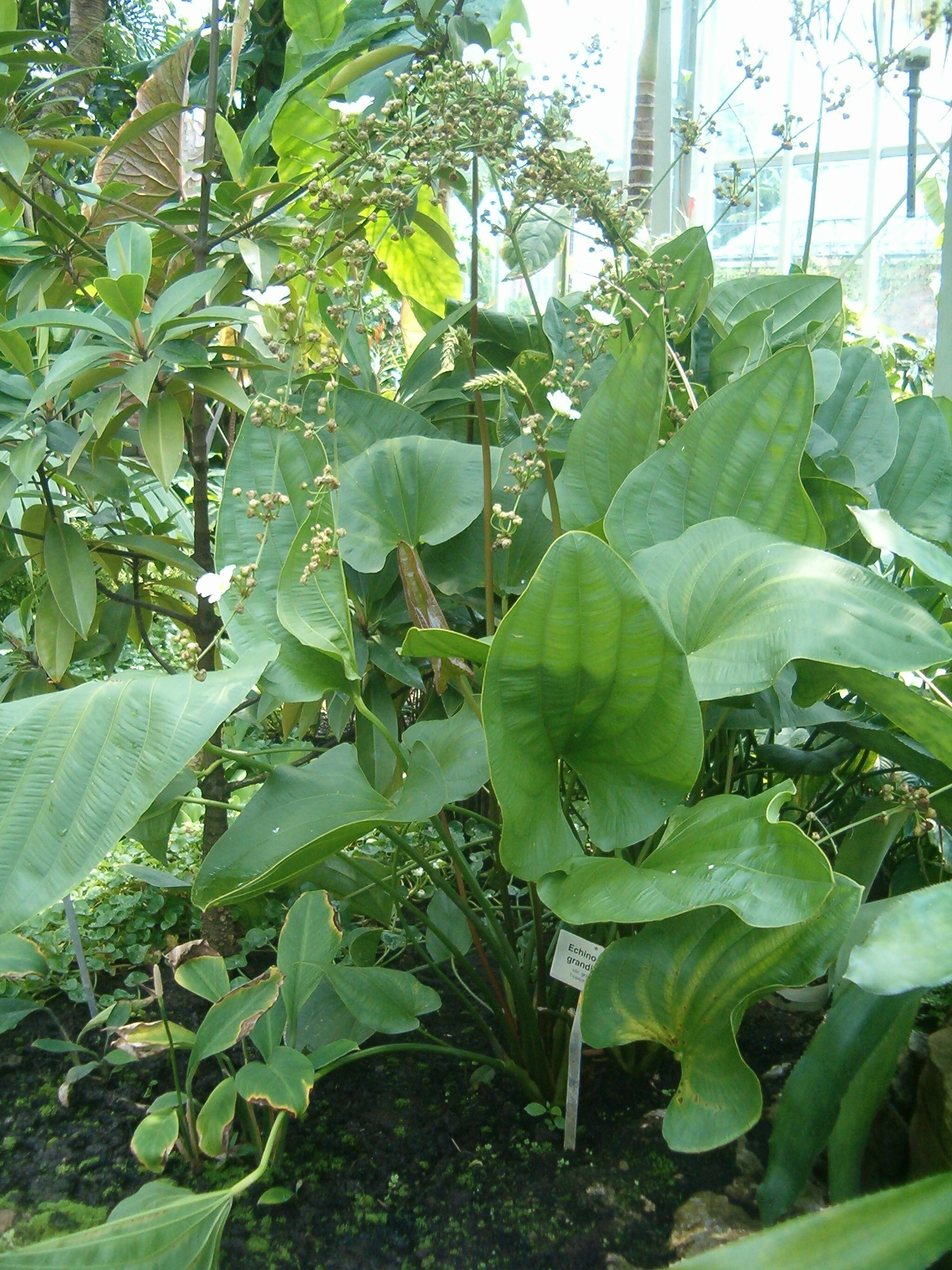

Scientific classification
- Kingdom: Plantae
- Clade: Tracheophytes
- Clade: Angiosperms
- Clade: Monocots
- Order: Alismatales
- Family: Alismataceae
- Genus: Echinodorus
- Species: E. grandiflorus

Binomial name
- Echinodorus grandiflorus (Cham. & Schltdl.) Micheli in A.L.P.de Candolle & A.C.P.de Candolle

Synonyms
- Alisma grandiflorum Cham. & Schltdl.; Echinodorus grandiflorus var. ovatus Micheli in A.L.P.de Candolle & A.C.P.de Candolle; Echinodorus grandiflorus var. bracteatus Rataj; Echinodorus argentinensis Rataj; Echinodorus pellucidus Rataj; Echinodorus floridanus R.R.Haynes & Burkhalter

= Echinodorus grandiflorus =

Species of aquatic plant

Echinodorus grandiflorus is a plant species in the Alismataceae. It is native to Brazil, Paraguay, Uruguay, Argentina, Venezuela and Florida.

== Description ==
Emerse leaves erect, long-petioled, 80–120 cm long. Blade ovate, at the tip shortly acuminate, at the base abrupt, or regularly oval, at the tip blunt or incised, 15 – 26 cm x 7 – 15 cm wide with 7 - 13 veins and distinct pellucid lines. Submersed leaves on short petioles, blades oval or ovate, on both ends acuminate or blunt. Stem erect, 90 – 150 cm long, sparse and inconspicuously warted, inflorescence paniculate, broadly branched in the lower whorl, having 5 - 12 whorls containing 6 - 12 flowers each. Bracts shorter or longer than the pedicels. Pedicels 1 - 2.5 cm long, sepals broadly ovate, ribbed, 4 – 6 mm long, petals white, corolla 3 – 4 cm in diameter. Stamens usually 24. Aggregate fruit globular, shortly echinate, achenes compressed, 3 mm long x 1 mm wide, having 3 - 5 ribs and 3 glands placed usually in one row, beak 0.4 - 0.5 mm long. Veins are often dark reddish-brown and the blade may have reddish-brown irregular spots.

== Cultivation ==
Needs a deep rich substrate and good light. Will withstand sub-tropical - tropical temperatures. A strong grower, too big for the average aquarium, the leaves soon growing out of the water. In the wild it grows in sticky mud along rivers. Rataj reports hybrids with E. grandiflorus and E. longiscapus which have mixed features. Supplement with iron and CO_{2} if possible. Seems to prefer soft to hard water.

Seems to bloom best in cooler water and in short-day conditions.

Apparently rarely found in the trade, the majority (if not all) specimens being offered being Echinodorus palaefolius.
