= Aphelandra longiflora =

Scientific classification
- Kingdom: Plantae
- Clade: Tracheophytes
- Clade: Angiosperms
- Clade: Eudicots
- Clade: Asterids
- Order: Lamiales
- Family: Acanthaceae
- Genus: Aphelandra
- Species: A. longiflora

Binomial name
- Aphelandra longiflora (Lindl.) Profice (2004)

Synonyms
- Synonymy: Geissomeria ciliata Rizzini (1952); Geissomeria cincinnata Nees (1847); Geissomeria cincinnata var. redacta Rizzini (1952); Geissomeria dawsonii Leonard (1959); Geissomeria dichroa Rizzini (1952); Geissomeria distans Nees (1847); Geissomeria longiflora Lindl. (1827); Geissomeria longiflora var. acuta Nees (1847); Geissomeria longiflora var. monostachya Nees (1847); Geissomeria longiflora var. obtusa Nees (1847); Geissomeria longiflora var. paniculata Nees (1847); Geissomeria perbracteosa Rizzini (1948); Geissomeria pubescens Nees (1847); Geissomeria pubescens var. velutina Nees (1847); Geissomeria tetragona Lindau (1897); Poecilocnemis cincinnata Mart. (1847); Poecilocnemis multiflora Mart. (1847); Ruellia spicata Vell. (1829), nom. illeg.; Stenandrium speciosum Nees ex Mart. (1841); Stephanophysum attenuatum Mart. (1837)

Species of flowering plant

Aphelandra longiflora is a species of flowering plant in the family Acanthaceae. It is native to Brazil, Bolivia, and Misiones Province of northeastern Argentina.
