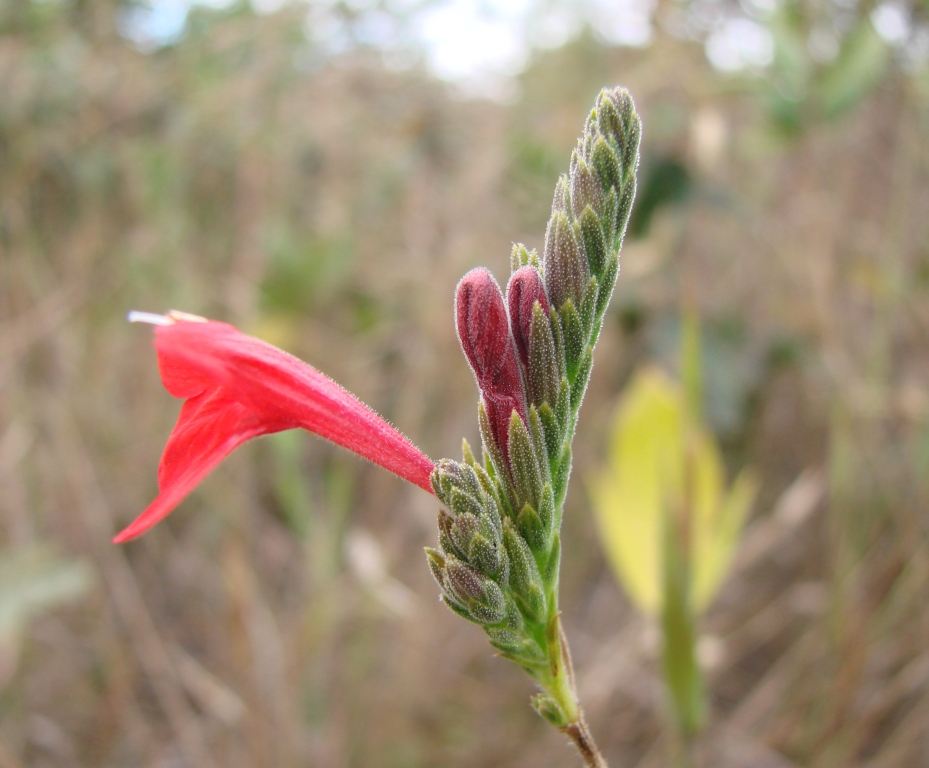

Scientific classification
- Kingdom: Plantae
- Clade: Tracheophytes
- Clade: Angiosperms
- Clade: Eudicots
- Clade: Asterids
- Order: Lamiales
- Family: Acanthaceae
- Genus: Justicia
- Species: J. lanstyakii

Binomial name
- Justicia lanstyakii Rizzini (1946)

= Justicia lanstyakii =

Species of flowering plant

Justicia lanstyakii is a plant native to the Cerrado vegetation of Brazil, first described by Carlos Toledo Rizzini in 1946.

== See also ==
- List of plants of Cerrado vegetation of Brazil
