= Justicia serrana =

Scientific classification
- Kingdom: Plantae
- Clade: Tracheophytes
- Clade: Angiosperms
- Clade: Eudicots
- Clade: Asterids
- Order: Lamiales
- Family: Acanthaceae
- Genus: Justicia
- Species: J. serrana

Binomial name
- Justicia serrana C.Kameyama

Synonyms
- Orthotactus montanus Nees (1847)

Species of flowering plant

Justicia serrana is a plant native to the Cerrado vegetation of Brazil.

== See also ==
- List of plants of Cerrado vegetation of Brazil
