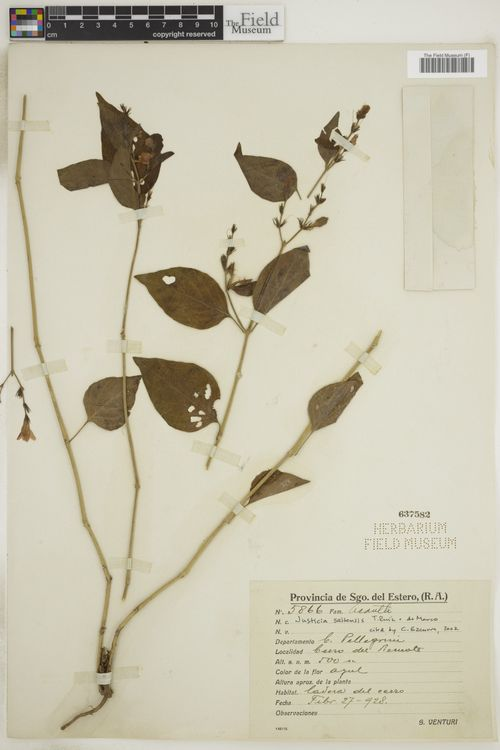

Scientific classification
- Kingdom: Plantae
- Clade: Tracheophytes
- Clade: Angiosperms
- Clade: Eudicots
- Clade: Asterids
- Order: Lamiales
- Family: Acanthaceae
- Genus: Justicia
- Species: J. saltensis

Binomial name
- Justicia saltensis Ter.Ruiz & N.De Marco

= Justicia saltensis =

Species of plant

Justicia saltensis is a plant species ranging from SW Bolivia to NW Argentina.
