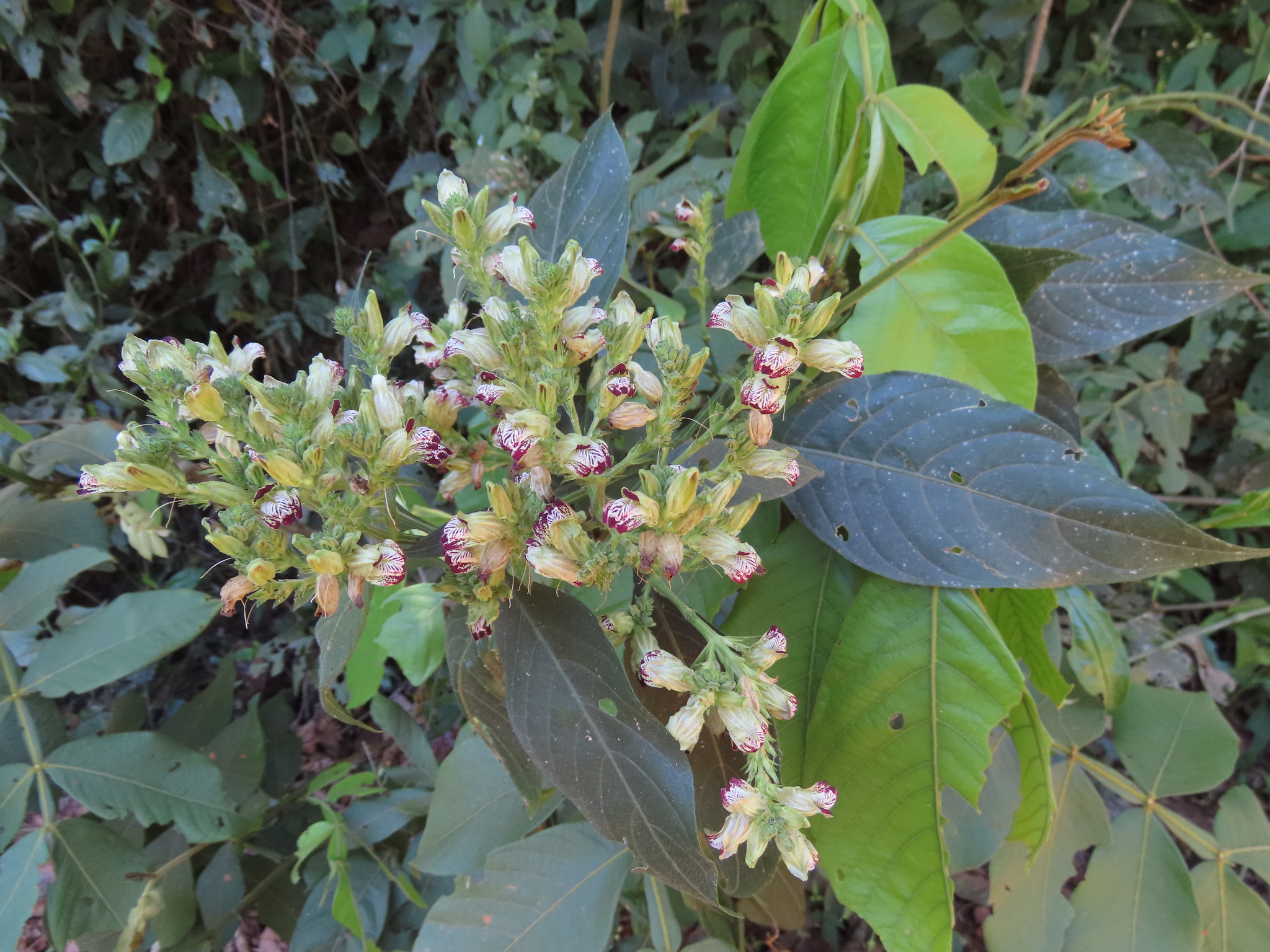

Scientific classification
- Kingdom: Plantae
- Clade: Embryophytes
- Clade: Tracheophytes
- Clade: Spermatophytes
- Clade: Angiosperms
- Clade: Eudicots
- Clade: Asterids
- Order: Lamiales
- Family: Acanthaceae
- Genus: Justicia
- Species: J. warmingii

Binomial name
- Justicia warmingii Hiern (1877)

Synonyms
- List: Ecbolium elegans (Nees) Kuntze (1891); Justicia elegans Pohl ex Nees (1847), pro syn.; Justicia glutinosa (Bremek.) V.A.W.Graham (1988); Justicia sarotheca V.A.W.Graham (1988); Sarotheca elegans Nees (1847); Sarotheca glutinosa Bremek. (1969)

= Justicia warmingii =

Species of flowering plant

Justicia warmingii is a species of flowering plant in the family Acanthaceae. It is native to Bolivia, the Cerrado ecoregion.of southeastern and west-central Brazil, Paraguay, northwestern Argentina, and Peru.

== See also ==
- List of plants of Cerrado vegetation of Brazil
