= Justicia riparia =

Scientific classification
- Kingdom: Plantae
- Clade: Tracheophytes
- Clade: Angiosperms
- Clade: Eudicots
- Clade: Asterids
- Order: Lamiales
- Family: Acanthaceae
- Genus: Justicia
- Species: J. riparia

Binomial name
- Justicia riparia Kameyama (1995)

Synonyms
- Beloperone mollis Nees (1847); Beloperone mollis var. amplior Nees (1847)

Species of flowering plant

Justicia riparia (syn. Beloperone mollis Nees) is a species of flowering plant. It is endemic to southeastern Brazil, where it is native to the Cerrado vegetation.

== See also ==
- List of plants of Cerrado vegetation of Brazil
