= Tyloglossa genistiformis =

Scientific classification
- Kingdom: Plantae
- (unranked): Angiosperms
- (unranked): Eudicots
- (unranked): Asterids
- Order: Lamiales
- Family: Acanthaceae
- Genus: Tyloglossa
- Species: T. genistiformis

Binomial name
- Tyloglossa genistiformis Nees

Species of flowering plant

Tyloglossa genistiformis is a species of flowering plant native to southeastern Brazil, where it grows in the Cerrado ecoregion.

Tyloglossa is now considered a synonym of Justicia, and Plants of the World Online lists this species as unplaced.
