= Froelichiella =

Scientific classification
- Kingdom: Plantae
- Clade: Tracheophytes
- Clade: Angiosperms
- Clade: Eudicots
- Order: Caryophyllales
- Family: Amaranthaceae
- Genus: Froelichiella; R.E.Fr. (1921)
- Species: F. grisea

Binomial name
- Froelichiella grisea (Lopr.) R.E.Fr. (1921)

Synonyms
- Gomphrena grisea Lopr. (1902)

Genus of flowering plants

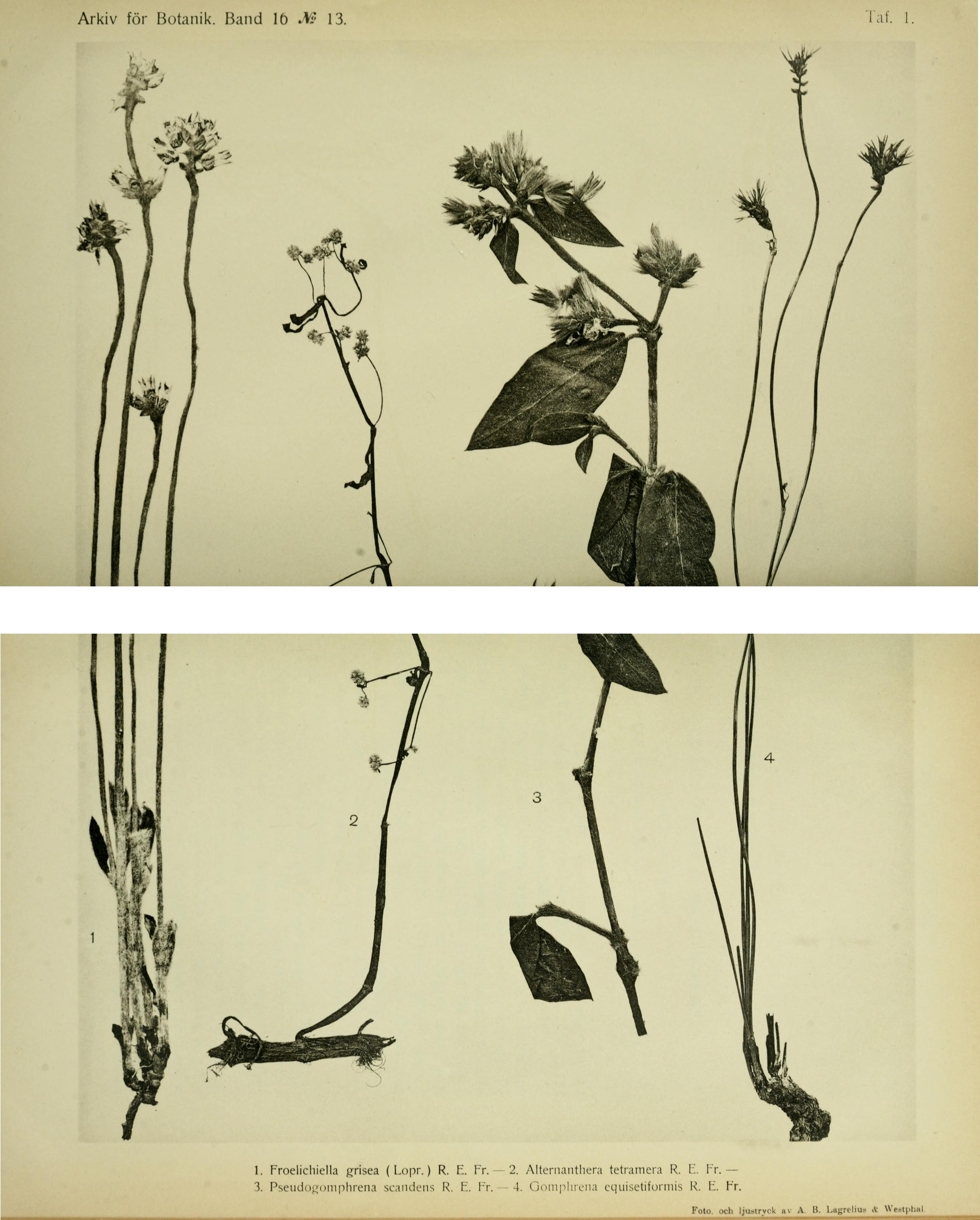
1. A Froelichiella grisea (Lopr.) R.E.Fr.

Froelichiella is a genus of Brazilian plants in the family Amaranthaceae. It is sometimes included in the genus Froelichia or family Chenopodiaceae.

There is one species in the genus, Froelichiella grisea, a subshrub endemic to Goiás state in west-central Brazil.
