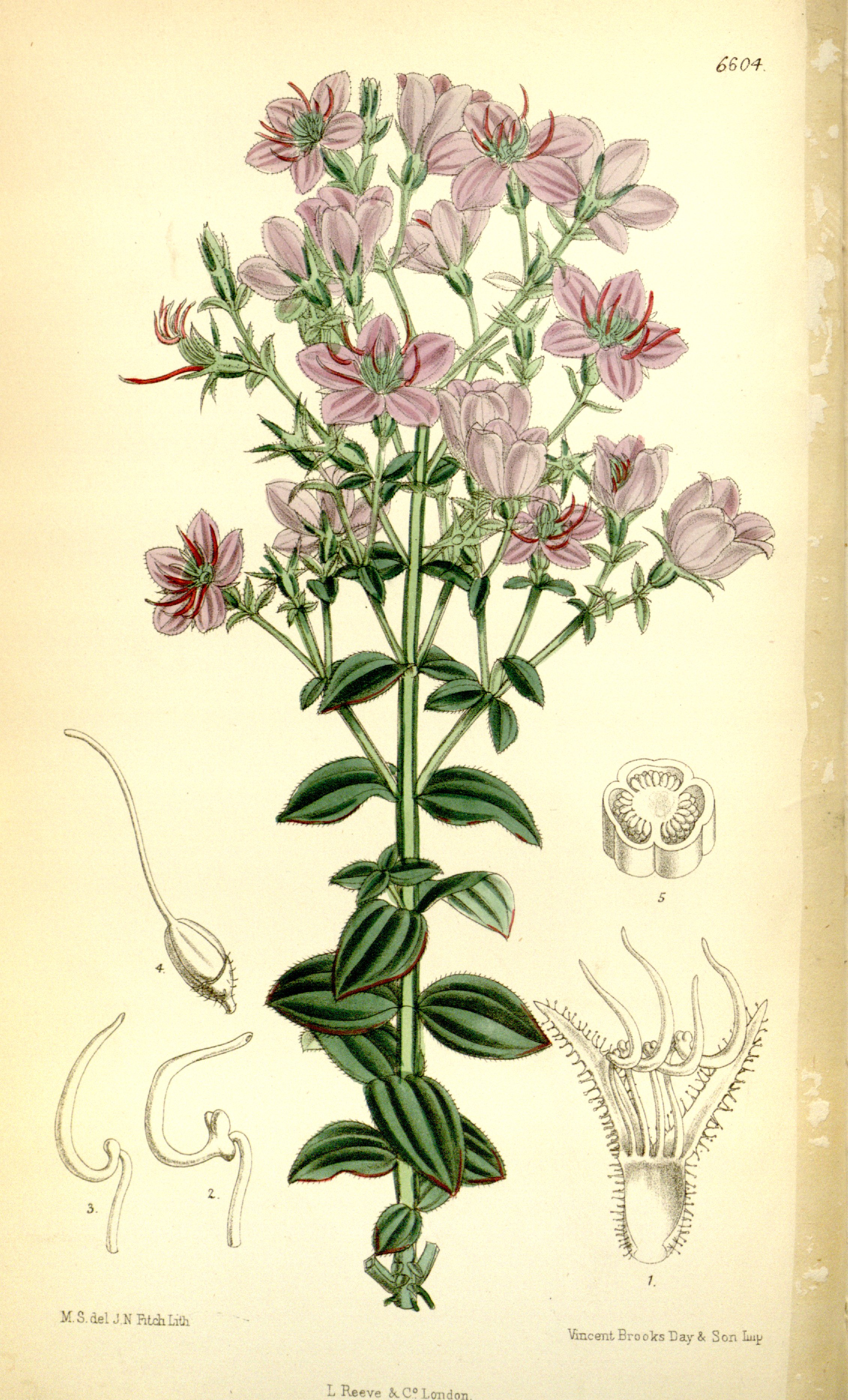
- Cambessedesia paraguayensis 108-6604.jpg

Scientific classification
- Kingdom: Plantae
- Clade: Tracheophytes
- Clade: Angiosperms
- Clade: Eudicots
- Clade: Rosids
- Order: Myrtales
- Family: Melastomataceae
- Subfamily: Melastomatoideae
- Tribe: Sonerileae
- Genus: Acisanthera; Patrick Browne 1756

= Acisanthera =

Genus of flowering plants

Acisanthera is a genus of flowering plants in the family Melastomataceae. It contains 11 species and is found in South America, Central America, and the Caribbean. It was described by Patrick Browne in 1756.

== Distribution ==
Many species in this genus are found in waterlogged savannas of the tropical regions of Central and South America.

== Species ==
As of 2020, Kew's Plants of the World Online accepts the following species:

- Acisanthera alata Cogn.
- Acisanthera alsinefolia (DC.) Triana
- Acisanthera ayangannae (Wurdack) M.J.Rocha & P.J.F.Guim.
- Acisanthera boliviensis Cogn. ex Kuntze
- Acisanthera glazioviana Cogn.
- Acisanthera hedyotoidea Triana
- Acisanthera paraguayensis Cogn.
- Acisanthera pulchella Cogn.
- Acisanthera quadrata Juss. ex Poir.
- Acisanthera uniflora (Vahl) Gleason
- Acisanthera variabilis Triana
