= Justicia burchellii =

Scientific classification
- Kingdom: Plantae
- Clade: Tracheophytes
- Clade: Angiosperms
- Clade: Eudicots
- Clade: Asterids
- Order: Lamiales
- Family: Acanthaceae
- Genus: Justicia
- Species: J. burchellii

Binomial name
- Justicia burchellii Hiern (1877)

Synonyms
- Chaetochlamys callichlamys Rizzini (1952)

Species of flowering plant

Justicia burchellii is a species of flowering plant in the family Acanthaceae. It is native to the Cerrado ecoregion of central Brazil.

== See also ==
- List of plants of Cerrado vegetation of Brazil
