= Augustin Saint-Hilaire =

French explorer and botanist (1779–1853)

Saint-Hilaire
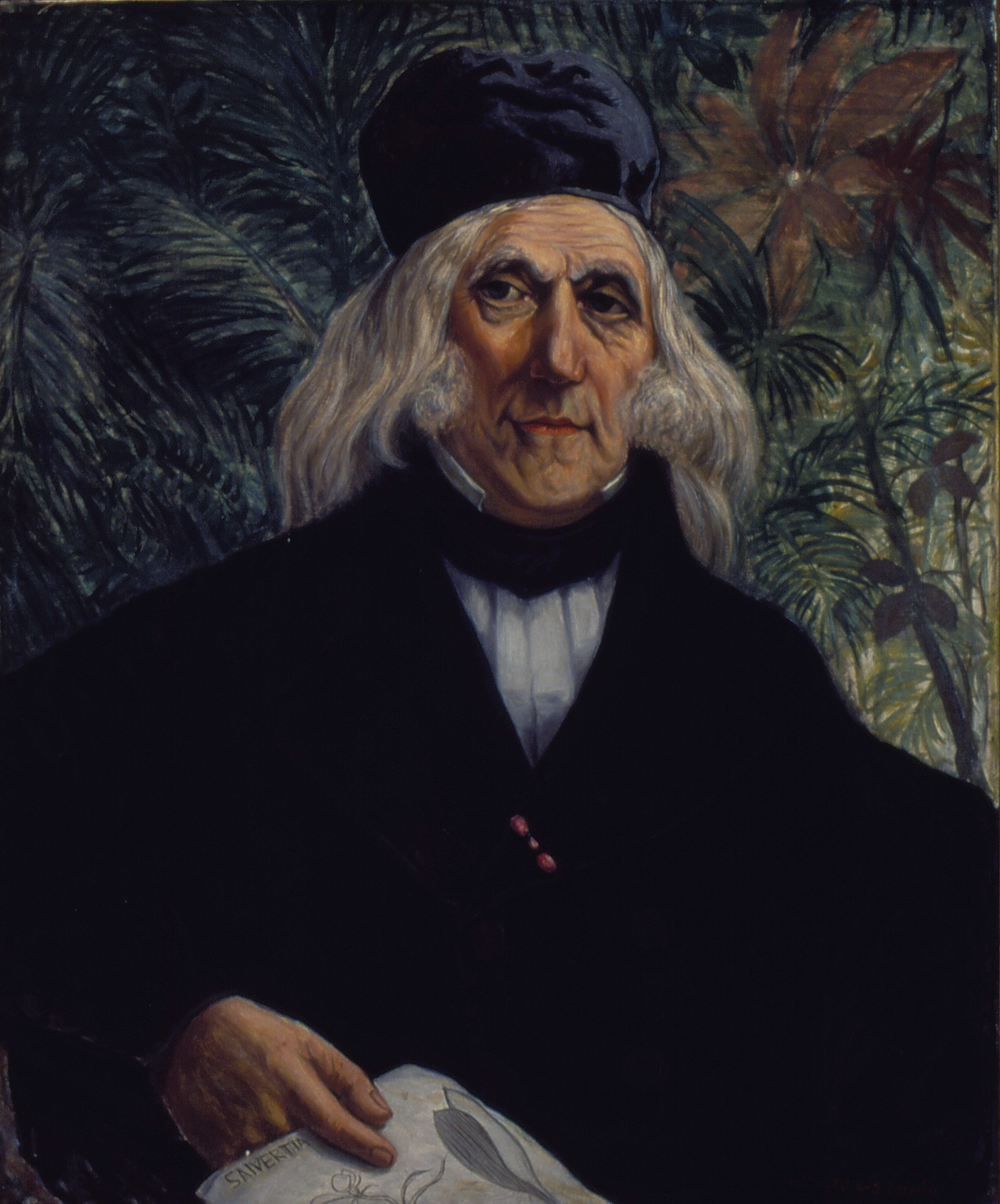
- Born: 4 October 1779; Orléans, Kingdom of France
- Died: 3 September 1853 (aged 73); Orléans, French Empire
- Scientific career
- Fields: Botany

Augustin François César Prouvençal de Saint-Hilaire (4 October 1779 – 3 September 1853) was a French botanist and traveller who was born and died in Orléans, France. A keen observer, he is credited with important discoveries in botany, notably the direction of the radicle in the embryo sac and the double point of attachment of certain ovules. He also described two families, the Paronychiae and the Tamariscinae, as well as many genera and species.

== Career ==
He began to publish memoirs on botanical subjects at an early age. Between 1816 and 1822, he traveled in South America, especially in south and central Brazil, and the results of his study of the rich flora of the regions through which he passed appeared in several books and numerous articles in scientific journals.

In his first voyage, from 1816 to 1822, he explored the Brazilian backlands, traveling ca. 9,000 km, from Southeast Brazil to Río de la Plata, including the former Cisplatina Province (Uruguay). He was able to gather 24,000 specimens of plants, with 6,000 species, 2,000 birds, 16,000 insects and 135 mammals, plus many reptiles, mollusks and fishes. Most of these species were described for the first time. In the next years he devoted himself to the study, classification, description and publication of this huge material, but he was considerably impaired by his ill health, due to diseases contracted during the tropical travels. In 1819 he was appointed correspondent of the Académie des Sciences. He was awarded the Légion d'honneur at the level of Chevalier, and the Portuguese Order of Christ.

== Works ==
The works by which he is best known are the Flora Brasiliae Meridionalis in three volumes (1825–1832), published in conjunction with Adrien-Henri de Jussieu and Jacques Cambessèdes, and illustrated by Pierre Jean François Turpin; Histoire des Plantes les plus Remarquables du Brésil et du Paraguay (1824), Plantes Usuelles des Brésiliens (1827–1828), also in conjunction with de Jussieu and Cambessèdes(1828); and Voyage Dans le District des Diamants et sur le littoral du Brésil, in two volumes (1833). His Leçons de Botanique, Comprénant Principalement la Morphologie Végetale (1840), was a comprehensive exposition of botanical morphology and of its application to systematic botany. He died at Orléans on 3 September 1853.

=== List of selected publications ===
- Saint-Hilaire, A.F.C.P (1824). "Indication abrégée des plantes de la flore du Brésil méridional, qui appartiennent au groupe des Droséracées, des Violacées, des Cistées et des Frankeniées". Annales des Sciences Naturelles (in Latin). 2: 248––255.
- Saint-Hilaire, Auguste (1824). "Tableau monographique des plantes de la flore du Brésil méridional appartenant au groupe (classe Br.) qui comprend qui comprend les Droséracées, les Violacées, les Cistinées et les Frankenicées: Violacées". Annales du museum national d'histoire naturelle (in French). 72: 445–498.

== See also ==
- List of plants of Caatinga vegetation of Brazil
- List of plants of Cerrado vegetation of Brazil
