= Justicia pycnophylla =

Scientific classification
- Kingdom: Plantae
- Clade: Tracheophytes
- Clade: Angiosperms
- Clade: Eudicots
- Clade: Asterids
- Order: Lamiales
- Family: Acanthaceae
- Genus: Justicia
- Species: J. pycnophylla

Binomial name
- Justicia pycnophylla Lindau (1898)

Species of flowering plant

Justicia pycnophylla is a species of flowering plant native to the Cerrado ecoregion of west-central Brazil.
