= Justicia phyllocalyx =

Scientific classification
- Kingdom: Plantae
- Clade: Embryophytes
- Clade: Tracheophytes
- Clade: Spermatophytes
- Clade: Angiosperms
- Clade: Eudicots
- Clade: Asterids
- Order: Lamiales
- Family: Acanthaceae
- Genus: Justicia
- Species: J. phyllocalyx

Binomial name
- Justicia phyllocalyx (Lindau) Wassh. & C.Ezcurra (1997)

Synonyms
- Jacobinia macedoana (Rizzini) Wassh., nom. inval.; Poikilacanthus phyllocalyx Lindau (1898); Sericographis macedoana Rizzini (1948)

Species of flowering plant

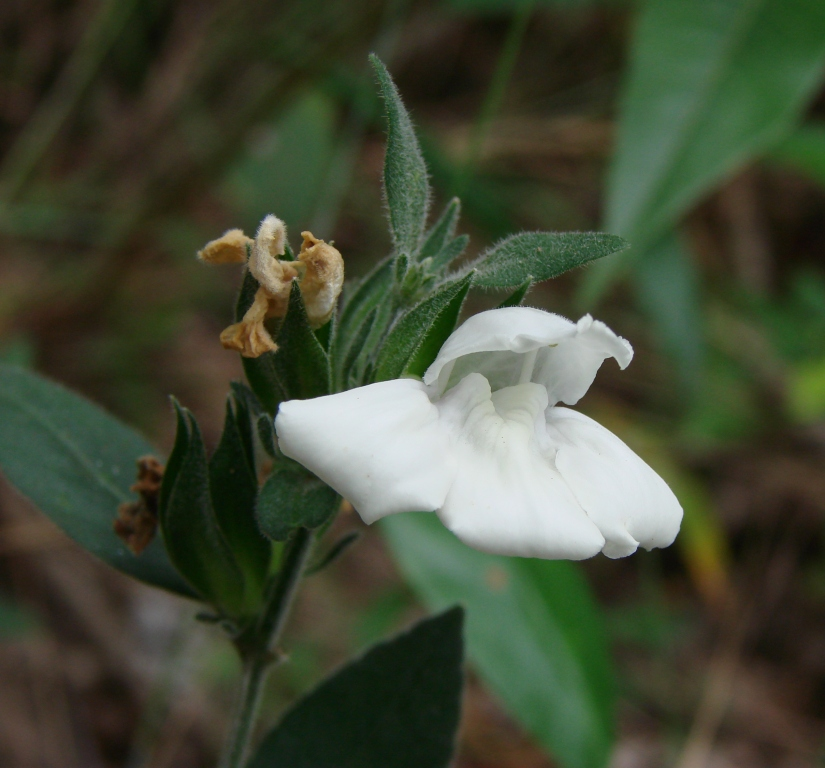
Justicia phyllocalyx flowering

Justicia phyllocalyx is a plant species native to central South America (Bolivia, west-central and southeastern Brazil, and Paraguay).
