= Louis Théodore Frederic Colladon =

Swiss botanist (1792–1862)

- Born: 25 August 1792; Geneva
- Died: 25 April 1862 (aged 69)
- Occupation: Swiss botanist

Louis Théodore Frederic Colladon (25 August 1792 – 25 April 1862) was a Swiss medical doctor and botanist known for his investigations of the plant genus Cassia. He was the son of pharmacist and amateur botanist Jean-Antoine Colladon (1755–1830).

He studied medicine at the University of Montpellier, where one of his instructors was botanist Augustin Pyramus de Candolle. After graduation, he started a medical practice in Paris. As a medical doctor, he distinguished himself in the treatment of cholera patients during the epidemic of 1832.

Among his written works was a monograph on Cassia titled "Histoire naturelle et médicale des casses, et particulièrement de la casse et des sénés employés en médecine" (1816) and a tale involving descent in a diving bell that was published in English as "Narrative of a descent in the diving-bell, &c. &c." (Edinburgh : Printed for A. Constable, 1821). In 1830 the plant genus Colladonia was named in his honor by Augustin Pyramus de Candolle.
