= Justicia chrysotrichoma =

Scientific classification
- Kingdom: Plantae
- Clade: Tracheophytes
- Clade: Angiosperms
- Clade: Eudicots
- Clade: Asterids
- Order: Lamiales
- Family: Acanthaceae
- Genus: Justicia
- Species: J. chrysotrichoma

Binomial name
- Justicia chrysotrichoma (Nees) Benth. (1876)

Synonyms
- Adhatoda chrysotrichoma (Nees) Nees (1847); Ecbolium chrysotrichomum (Nees) Kuntze (1891); Justicia chrysotrichoma var. albiflora Taub. (1896); Tyloglossa chrysotrichoma Nees (1847)

Species of flowering plant

Justicia chrysotrichoma is a species of flowering plant in the family Acanthaceae. It is native to the Cerrado ecoregion of central Brazil.
