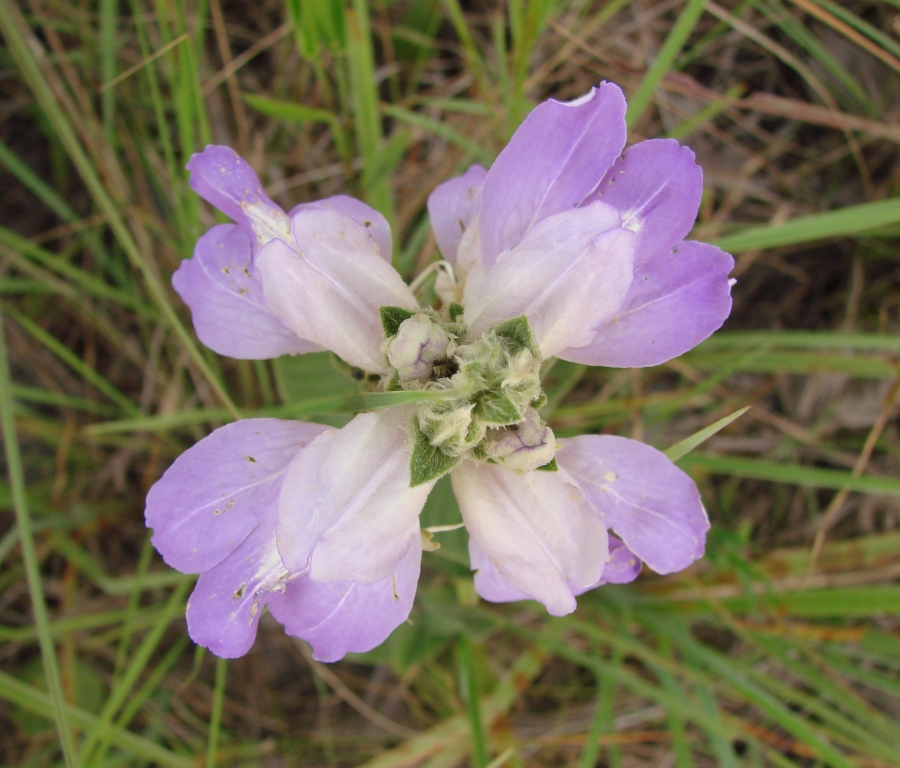

Scientific classification
- Kingdom: Plantae
- Clade: Tracheophytes
- Clade: Angiosperms
- Clade: Eudicots
- Clade: Asterids
- Order: Lamiales
- Family: Acanthaceae
- Genus: Justicia
- Species: J. irwinii

Binomial name
- Justicia irwinii Wassh. (1989)

= Justicia irwinii =

Species of flowering plant

Justicia irwinii is a species of plant in the family Acanthaceae.

== Distribution and habitat ==
J. irwinii is native to Brazil, where it occurs in the Federal District and the neighboring state of Goiás at elevations between 850–1,100 m (2,790–3,610 ft). It can be found in a diverse range of habitats where partial shade is present.

== Description ==
J. irwinii is a herb or subshrub growing to 75–100 cm (30–39 in) tall. The stems are quadrangular and hairy, with a dense covering of white trichomes. The leaves are ovate with a pointed tip, measuring 10–16.5 cm (3.9–6.5 in) long and 3.3–7.3 cm (1.3–2.9 in) wide. The upper surface of the leaf is dark green and moderately hairy. The undersides of the leaves are yellowish-green, hairy, with prominent veins. The lavender flowers, each measuring around 2.8 cm (1.1 in) long, are borne on spikes. The fruit is a small capsule that is green or purplish-green when fresh, turning brown as it dries.
