= Johann Baptist Emanuel Pohl =

Austrian botanist, entomologist, geologist, mineralogist and physician

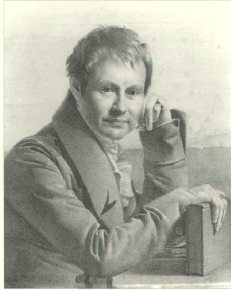
Johann Pohl (1782-1834)

Johann Baptist Emanuel Pohl (23 February 1782, Česká Kamenice (German: Böhmisch Kamnitz) – 22 May 1834, Vienna) was an Austrian botanist, entomologist, geologist, mineralogist, and medical doctor.

== Biography ==
Johann Emanuel Pohl grew up in Politz an der Elbe (Boletice nad Labem−(in Czech) of northwestern Bohemia, in the present day Děčín District of the northern Czech Republic.

He studied in Prague, and graduated as Doctor of Medicine in 1808.

While he taught botany at the university he became librarian and curator of the collections of the Princess Kinsky. After a stint teaching at the university he worked in military hospitals in Náchod and Prague.

In this period he published the Tentamen florae bohemicae of which only the first two volumes were published: Expositio generalis anatomica organi auditus per classes animalium and Systematischer Überblick der Reihenfolge der einfachen Fossilien.

He made his professional name in several branches of natural history.

=== Brazil ===
In 1817, he accompanied the Archduchess Leopoldine to Brazil on the occasion of her marriage to Dom Pedro I, and then was chosen by his government to participate in the Austrian Brazil Expedition in charge of mineralogy and geology.

After the return of Dr. Mikan to Europe, he was responsible for the botany collections as well. Pohl spent four years between 1817 and 1821 in Brazil, during which he explored mainly the provinces of Minas Gerais, Goias, Bahia; as well as the province of Rio de Janeiro as far as the District of Ilha Grande.

His voluminous collections, among them some 4000 specimens of plants, were housed with the rest of the expedition collections in the Brazil Museum of Vienna, which included also two live 'human specimens' − a pair of Botocudo tribespeople. The woman died soon after, and the man was eventually returned to his native homeland.

After his return to Europe, Pohl served as a curator at the Vienna Natural History Museum and the Brazil Museum of Vienna until his death.

== Bibliography ==
- Books by Johann Emanuel Pohl on WorldCat

== See also ==
- Pohl
