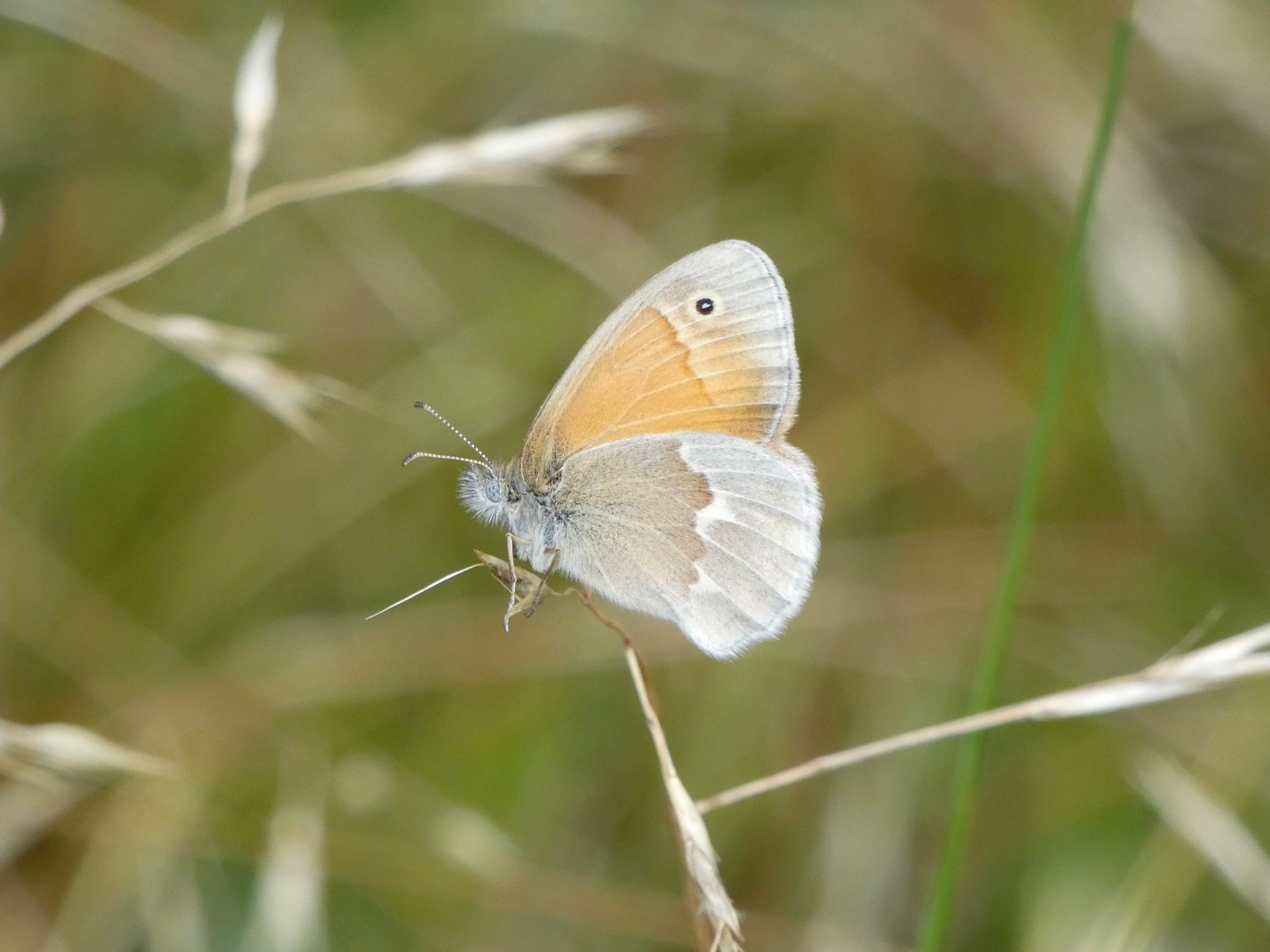

Scientific classification
- Kingdom: Animalia
- Phylum: Arthropoda
- Clade: Pancrustacea
- Class: Insecta
- Order: Lepidoptera
- Family: Nymphalidae
- Genus: Coenonympha
- Species: C. california

Binomial name
- Coenonympha california Westwood, 1851

= Coenonympha california =

Species of butterfly

Coenonympha california, also known as the California ringlet or common ringlet, is a species of butterfly native to North America. Although it has previously been considered a subspecies of Coenonympha tullia, genetic testing suggests it is a separate species.

== Morphology and appearance ==
Extreme phenotypic variation across several geographic ranges and subspecies populations characterizes Coenonympha california's wing shape. The wings' dorsal ground color varies, ranging from mild ochre, deep orange-ochre, yellow, and pale/white. An inconsistent presentation of submarginal eyespots, called ocelli, on the ventral hind wings closely correspond with this variation. Some butterflies can have many well-developed, dark ocelli within a single location, or they can have none at all. Additionally, the species exhibits localized intergradation, where characteristics like eyespot count and ground color create wide, continuous geographic clines instead of distinct morphological boundaries between nominal subspecies.

== Taxonomy ==
Coenonympha california contains the following subspecies:

- Coenonympha california mcisaaci
- Coenonympha california galactinus
- Coenonympha california benjamini
- Coenonympha california mackenziei
- Coenonympha california yontocket
- Coenonympha california eryngii
- Coenonympha california eunomia
- Coenonympha california columbiana
- Coenonympha california mono
- Coenonympha california elko
- Coenonympha california pseudobrenda
- Coenonympha california subfusca
- Coenonympha california furcae
- Coenonympha california nipisiquit
- Coenonympha california ampelos
- Coenonympha california ochracea
- Coenonympha california insulana
- Coenonympha california inornata
- Coenonympha california california

== Habitat and behavior ==
C. california is typically found in fields, upland pastures, open foothill woods, and temperature grasslands. Certain limited populations have evolved to flourish in specialized, ecologically constrained settings, moving away from generic grasslands. The stability and survival of target population depend heavily on habitat quality, which is determined by the availability of local resources and environmental elements like sheltering.

== Dietary adaptations ==
Meadow grasses such as Carex inops and thatch are the primary food source for the larvae of C. california, but highly confined subspecies have developed unique nutritional needs to endure harsh conditions. The physical characteristics of the host plants, such as dense tussock growth forms, can significantly improve larval survival in related Coenonympha populations by offering vital shelter during overwintering periods.

A study of adult feeding behavior in cattle-grazed grasslands of western Washington found adult C. california nectaring on eleven species of flowering plant with Daucus carota and Leucanthemum vulgare being the most commonly visited flowers. Less frequently visited plants included Achillea millefolium, Capsella bursa-pastoris, Crepis capillaris, Cytisus scoparius, Hypochaeris radicata, Lomatium triternatum, Ranunculus occidentalis, Solidago spp., and Trifolium repens.

== Life cycle and reproduction ==
The life cycle of Coenonympha california goes through significant variation depending on geographic location, altitude, and subspecies. In habitats at higher elevations, populations may be univoltine, producing just one brood annually, depending on local climate. Oppositely, populations in lower-elevation, warmer or southern locations are usually bivoltine, giving birth to two different broods per year. The second brood in bivoltine populations usually appears in the late summer after the first one flies in the spring.

In contrast to the buff-colored summer brood, the adult butterflies of the spring brood frequently exhibit darker and grayer colors. This phenotypic plasticity may help with thermoregulation during the colder spring temperatures.

== Parasites ==
Wolbachia bacteria, a reproductive parasite that causes cytoplasmic incompatibility and can quickly change the genetic makeup of populations across multiple broods, can also have a significant impact on reproduction and gene flow in these populations.

== Species status and genetics ==
The C. california was formerly considered a subspecies of the Holarctic Coenonympha tullia. However, North American populations are not the sister group of Eurasian C.tullia, according to molecular phylogenetic analysis. The recognition of C. california as a unique, distinct species peculiar to North America was made possible by studying their genetic diversity.

Due to the great levels of genetic variation in wing patterns, including dorsal ground color and ventral eyespot expression, the taxonomy of C. california is infamously complicated. Numerous subspecies within its range have previously been described as a result of this physical variety, including C. c. benjamini, C. c. eryngii, C. c. eunomia, and C. c. ampelos. Genetic research examining contact zones in areas like northern California have not discovered any meaningful genetic boundaries or reproductive isolation between many of these formal subspecies, despite these striking morphological distinctions. The genomic data clearly suggest widespread morphological intergradation and ongoing gene flow, rather than rigid divides.
