= Phytoecia erythrocnema =

Scientific classification
- Domain: Eukaryota
- Kingdom: Animalia
- Phylum: Arthropoda
- Class: Insecta
- Order: Coleoptera
- Suborder: Polyphaga
- Infraorder: Cucujiformia
- Family: Cerambycidae
- Genus: Phytoecia
- Species: P. erythrocnema

Binomial name
- Phytoecia erythrocnema Lucas, 1847

Synonyms
- Phytoecia cosettae Iablokoff, 1953

Species of beetle

Phytoecia erythrocnema is a species of beetle in the family Cerambycidae. It was described by Hippolyte Lucas in 1847. It is known from Portugal, France, Algeria, Spain, Morocco, and Tunisia It feeds on Daucus carota.
