= Monochlamydeae =

Unranked group of plants

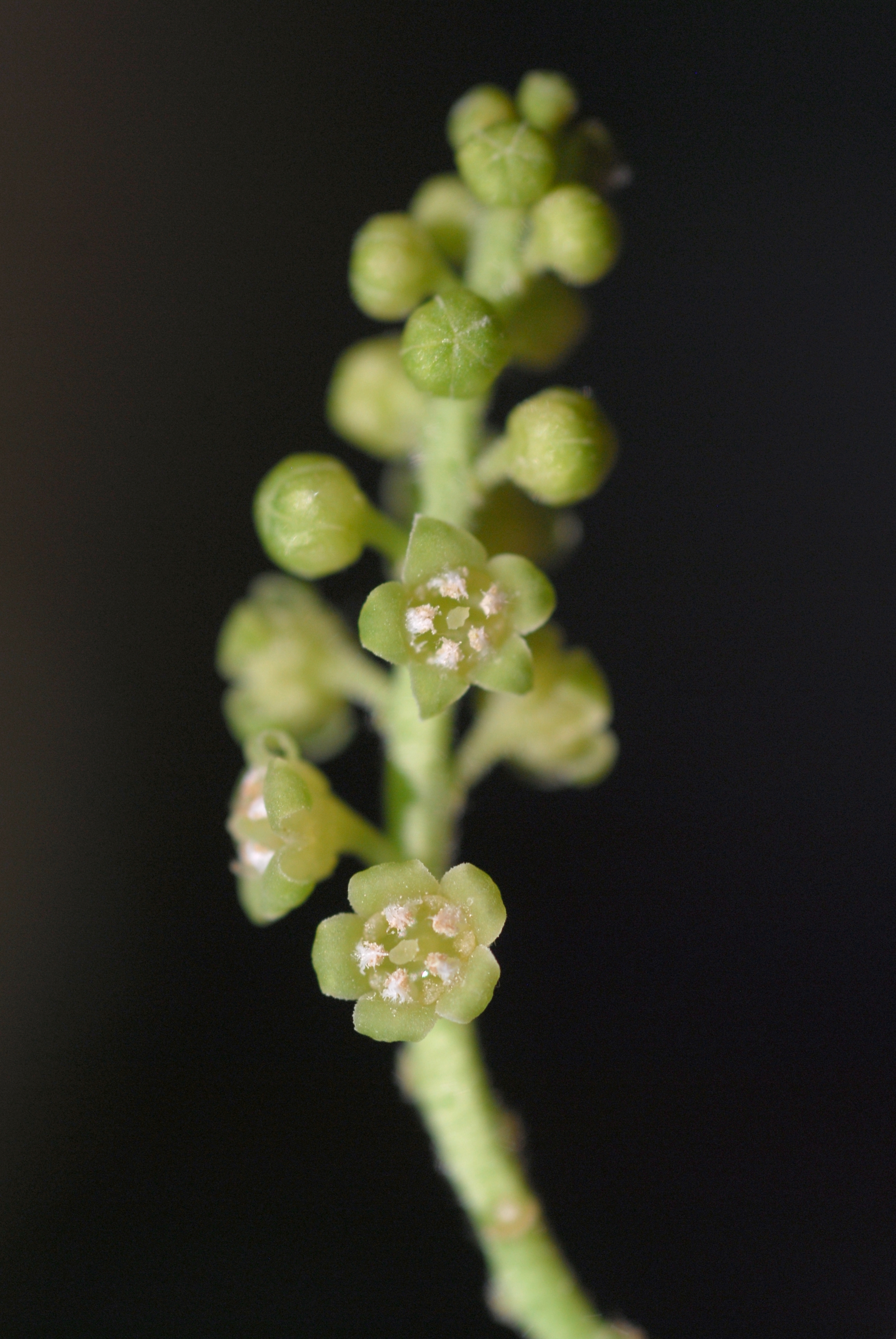
Pyrularia, in family Santalaceae, is one of the genera included in Monochlamydeae.

Monochlamydae is an artificial taxonomic group used in the identification of plants. It was largely abandoned by taxonomists in the 19th century, but has been often used since. Bentham and Hooker's classification, published in 1880, used this grouping, but stated that it was neither natural nor well defined, and that De Candolle's system was superior. Under Engler and Prantl's revision of 1931, the group Monochlamydeae was completely abandoned.

The group was one of three within the Dicotyledons, the others being Polypetalae and Gamopetalae. It included plants with flowers that had either a calyx or corolla, but not both.
