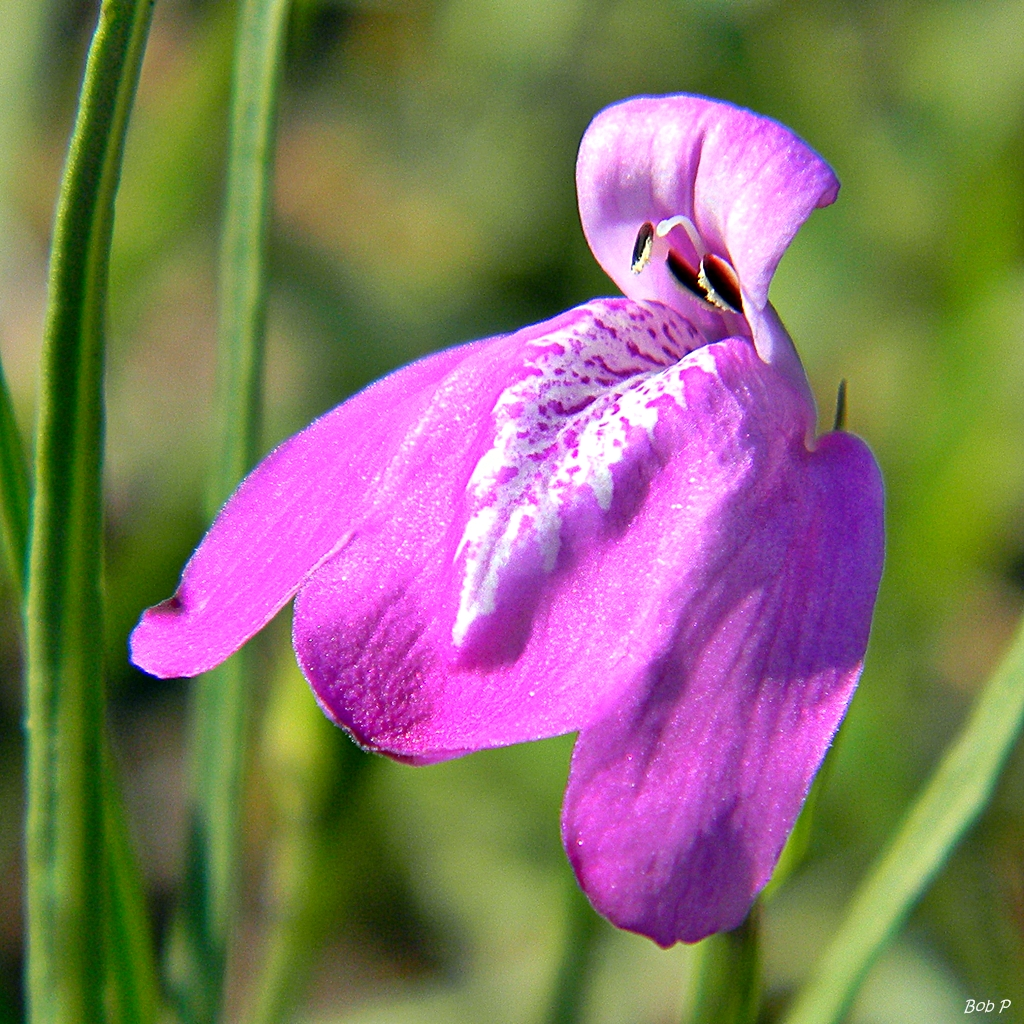
- At Sweetbay Natural Area in Palm Beach County, Florida

Scientific classification
- Kingdom: Plantae
- Clade: Tracheophytes
- Clade: Angiosperms
- Clade: Eudicots
- Clade: Asterids
- Order: Lamiales
- Family: Acanthaceae
- Genus: Dianthera
- Species: D. angusta

Binomial name
- Dianthera angusta (Chapm.) Small

Synonyms
- Dianthera ovata var. angusta Chapm.; Justicia angusta (Chapm.) Small; Justicia ovata var. angusta (Chapm.) R.W.Long

= Dianthera angusta =

Species of flowering plant

Dianthera angusta, the pineland waterwillow, is a flowering plant. It grows in parts of Florida and a few areas of Georgia in habitats near lakes and ponds as well as wet pineland and prairie areas. It is in the Acanthaceae family.

It has been placed in both the genus Justicia, and the genus Dianthera. In Georgia, this dicot perennial herb has been located growing in roadside ditches and with Hartwrightia in shallow sloughs and wet savannas.
