= Mordellistena algeriensis =

Scientific classification
- Kingdom: Animalia
- Phylum: Arthropoda
- Class: Insecta
- Order: Coleoptera
- Suborder: Polyphaga
- Infraorder: Cucujiformia
- Family: Mordellidae
- Genus: Mordellistena
- Species: M. algeriensis

Binomial name
- Mordellistena algeriensis Ermisch, 1966

Species of beetle

Mordellistena algeriensis is a species of beetle in the genus Mordellistena of the family Mordellidae. It was discovered in 1966. It can be found in Sardinia, Tunisia, and Algeria. The beetle can be found on Daucus carota inflorescences.
