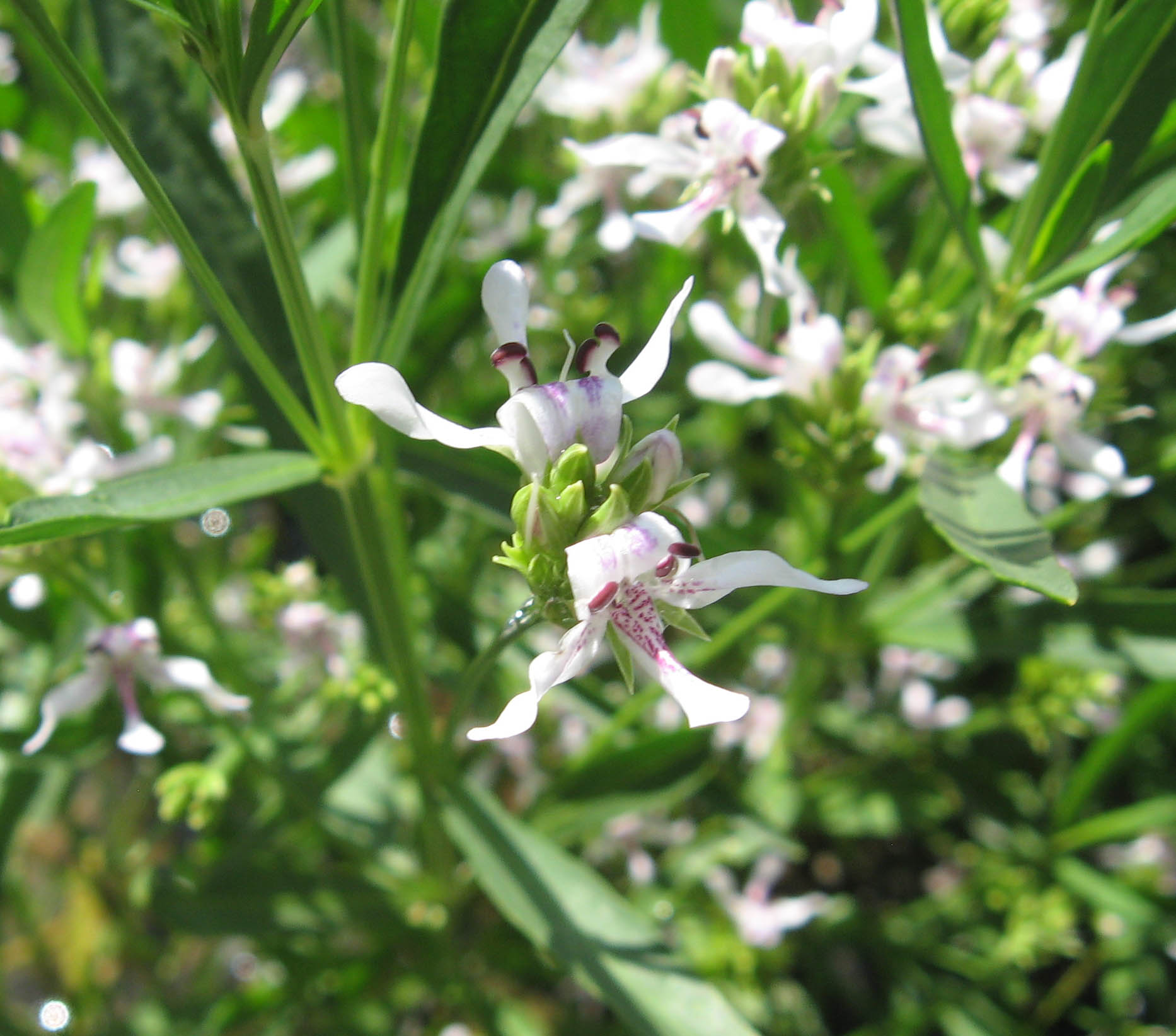

Conservation status
- Least Concern (IUCN 3.1)

- Secure (NatureServe)

Scientific classification
- Kingdom: Plantae
- Clade: Tracheophytes
- Clade: Angiosperms
- Clade: Eudicots
- Clade: Asterids
- Order: Lamiales
- Family: Acanthaceae
- Genus: Dianthera
- Species: D. americana

Binomial name
- Dianthera americana L. (1753)

Synonyms
- Dianthera americana var. subcoriacea (Fernald) Shinners (1957); Dianthera ensiformis Walter (1788); Dianthera formosa Raf. (1840); Dianthera heterophyla Raf. (1840); Dianthera linearifolia (Lam.) Raf. (1840); Dianthera longifolia Raf. (1840); Dianthera repanda Raf. (1840); Ecbolium americanum (L.) Kuntze (1891); Gendarussa pedunculosa C.Presl (1845); Justicia americana (L.) Vahl (1791); Justicia americana var. subcoriacea Fernald (1941); Justicia ensiformis (Walter) Forsyth f. (1794); Justicia linearifolia Lam. (1785); Justicia mortui-fluminis Fernald (1942); Justicia pedunculosa Michx. (1803), nom. superfl.; Justicia umbratilis Fernald (1941), nom. illeg.; Rhytiglossa ensiformis Alph.Wood (1861); Rhytiglossa pedunculosa Nees (1847), nom. superfl.

= Dianthera americana =

American water-willow

Species of aquatic plant

Dianthera americana, commonly known as the American water-willow, is an herbaceous, aquatic flowering plant in the family Acanthaceae. This perennial species is native to North America, and can typically be found in abundance throughout the eastern half of the continent along shorelines, in lakes or ponds, or in the shallow riffles of streams and rivers. The species has biological interest because of its unusual vegetative reproduction and historical association with mosquito breeding.

== Etymology ==
The American water-willow was formerly known as Justicia americana, named after Scottish botanist and horticulturalist James Justice. "Americana" reflects the plant's origin in the Americas.

The common name "water-willow" comes from the plant's leaves resembling those of willow trees, though the plant is not woody or related to the willows.

== Morphology and anatomy ==
=== Shoots and stems ===
D. americana grows partially submerged in still or flowing water, reaching anywhere from about 1.6 to 4 feet (48.7 to 121.92 cm) tall from a slender, creeping rhizome. These plants produce both stolons and erect stems, which allow them to form extensive colonies, with some exceeding 90 m² (or 1,000 ft²). The stems are green, straight, and angular to hexagonal in their cross-section. Their diameter can be around 2 cm (0.8 in) at their base in deep water and taper to less than 0.3 cm (0.1 in) towards the apex. Erect stems vary in size depending on the water depth that they reside in. These stems usually reach around 50 to 100 cm (1.6 to 3.3 ft) in height, but in deep water, they can grow closer to 1.5m (almost 5 ft). In established patches, around 10-22 stems occur every square foot. Stems growing in deep water often produce adventitious water roots on the lower 4-8 nodes, and leaves only grow about 1-5 nodes above that zone.

The stolons are anatomically similar to the erect stems, but produce roots at every node. They creep several feet across the substrate and remain green unless they are covered by sediment. Dense colonies can contain more than 173 miles of stolons per acre, and average stolon lengths of 52 inches by the later summer. Nodes on stolons can rapidly produce new shoots, and detached fragments can float for many days before rerooting along shorelines and producing more shoots.

=== Roots ===
D. americana has a fibrous root system of mostly adventitious roots. A single primary root forms at germination, then numerous adventitious roots develop soon afterwards from stolon nodes and the lower nodes of submerged erect stems. The roots are short, green when exposed to the sun, and lack root hairs. Cross-sections of the roots show a band of collenchyma containing chloroplasts beneath the epidermis, extensive parenchyma with large air spaces (about a quarter of parenchyma volume), and a small central cylinder with thin phloem, xylem with few vessels, and thin-walled parenchyma at its core.

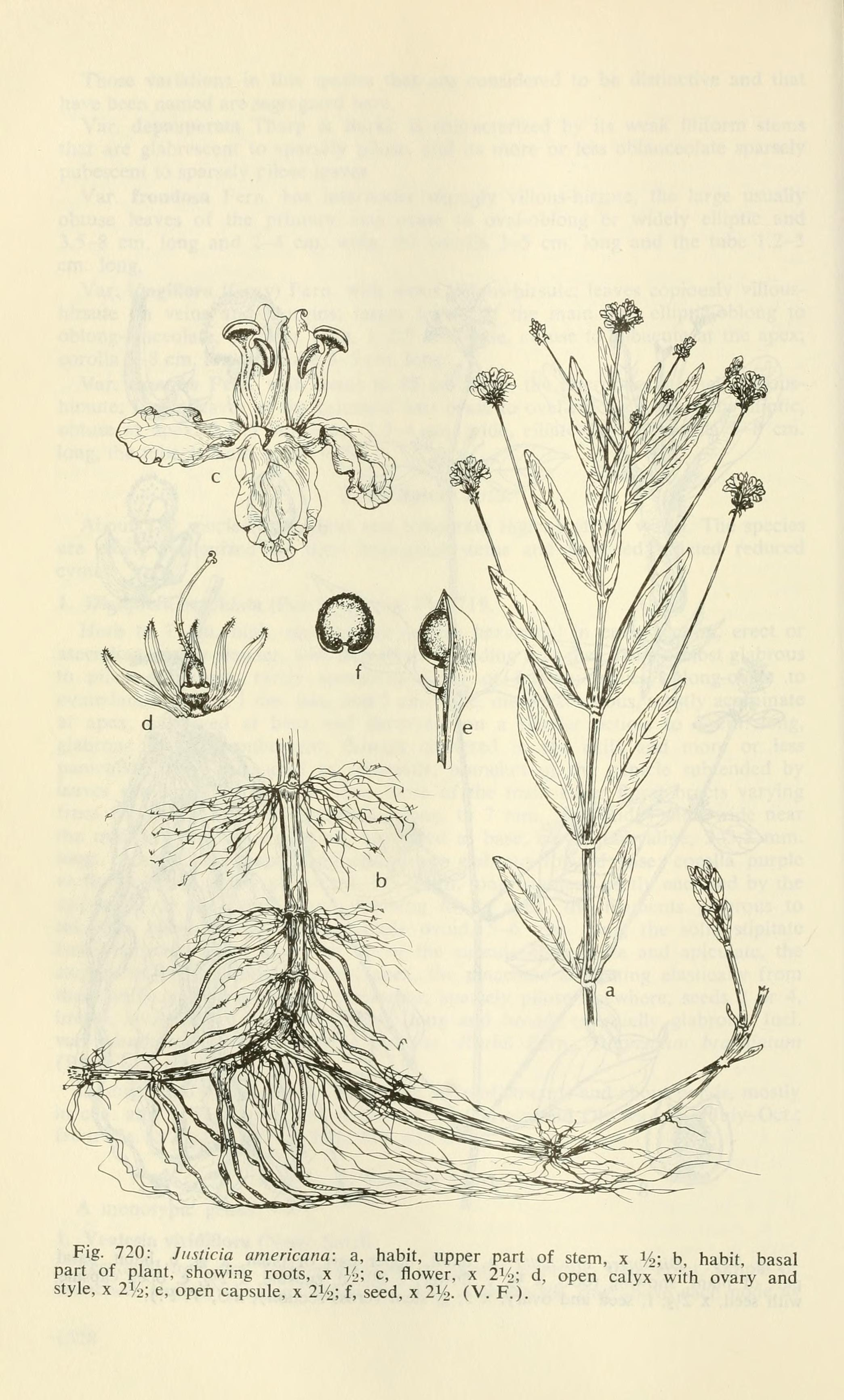
D. americana morphological features

=== Leaves ===
The leaves are simple, ranging 8 to 16 cm (3 to 6in) long and 8 to 25 (1/3 to 1in) wide. They are opposite, sessile, and produced on both stolons and erect stems, except in water deeper than about 60 cm (2 ft). They are lanceolate to linear, and are compared to the leaves of willows. The blades are entire or slightly crenulate, glabrous, and have a leathery or rubbery texture. They have two layers of palisade cells, six to ten layers of spongy chlorenchyma, and a lens-shaped vascular bundle that is embedded in the parenchyma at the midvein. Although D. americana is in aquatic conditions, the leaves lack the expected hydrophytic attributes.

=== Flowers and sexual reproduction ===
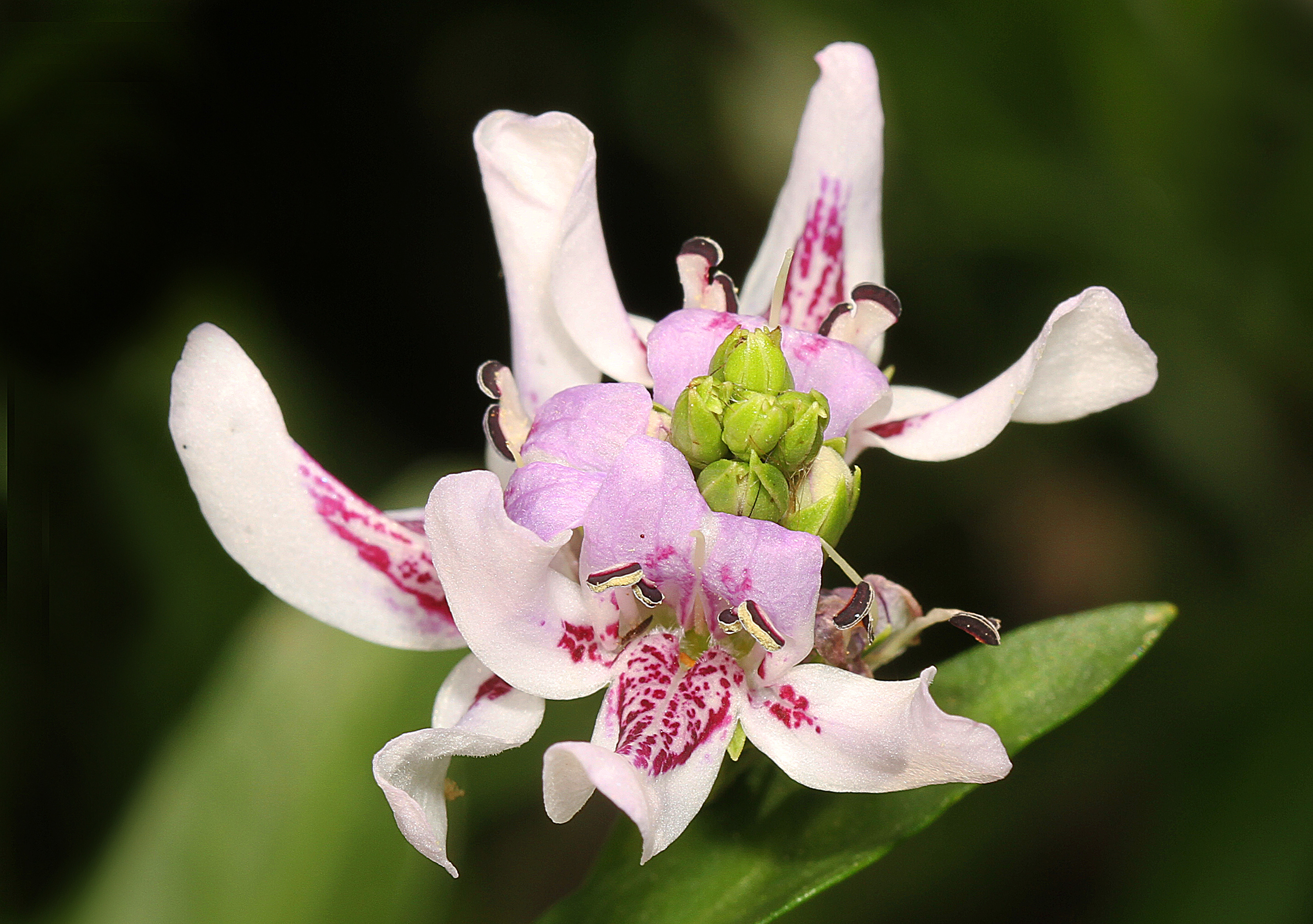
D. Americana flower

Blooming of flowers usually occurs between July and September, though flowering has been documented as early as May. Flowers are often in full bloom by the beginning of June and it is usually complete by the middle of July, except in deeper water, where it continues for longer. Individual flowers are white or pale lavender, are spotted or lightly speckled with purple, and have dark purple mottling near the base of the lower lip. The corolla is tubular and less than 1 inch wide. Only a few flowers open at the same time, but their display is considered showy and extends over a long blooming period. A distinctive feature of the flowers is that each anther is divided into two unequal sacs, giving the appearance of two anthers on each filament, which is reflected in the genus name Dianthera.

=== Fruits and seeds ===
The fruit of this plant is a small brown capsule that is two-carpelled and obovate. When the fruit is ripe, the capsule splits and forcibly ejects its four seeds 1 to 4 feet. The seeds float in the water briefly before washing ashore and germinating immediately. The seeds are heart-shaped, wafer-thin, and slightly biconvex. The seedlings have only one stele, but develop more bundles as the leaf gaps grow.

== Distribution and habitat ==
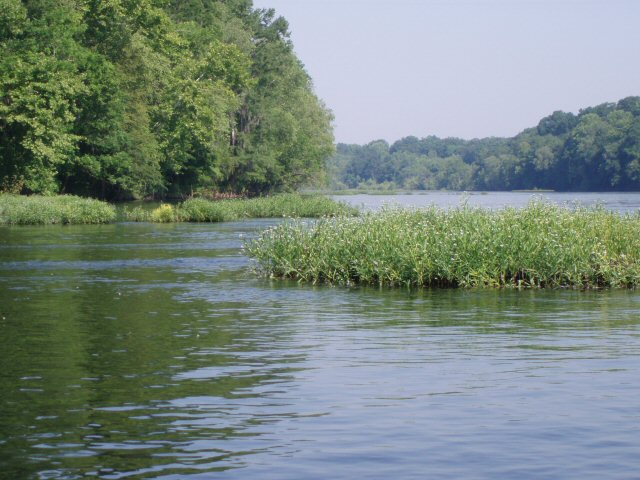
D. americana in typical habitat

D. americana is native to eastern North America. It ranges from Quebec and Ontario, down to Georgia and Texas, and west to Nebraska and northern Mexico (Coahuila and Chihuahua). It is widely found in the eastern US and is common in Tennessee Valley reservoirs.

Plants are typically found along shores, streambanks, and shallow riverbeds. They strongly favor flowing water, and are uncommonly seen in stagnant ponds. They can also grow in gravel, sand, mud, and occasionally on driftwood or logs. They cannot survive in areas with lots of erosion, but can tolerate some wave action.

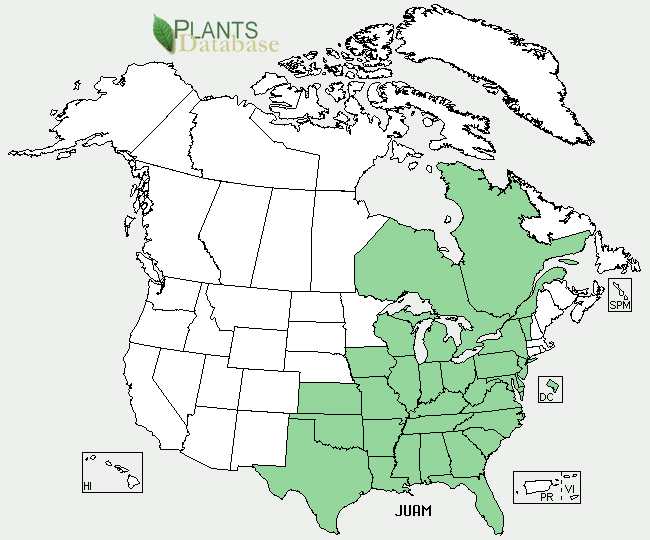
D. americana distribution

=== Conservation status in Canada ===
At the northern end of its range, Dianthera americana is a listed threatened species on Schedule 1 under the Canadian Species at Risk Act. Unseasonal and extreme anthropogenic water level fluctuations and competition from invasive species have contributed to its decline, particularly in the Rivière des Mille Îles, Quebec, and it is today represented by 13 populations in southern Ontario and southwest Quebec.

== Ecology ==
Pollinators of D. americana flowers include bees, butterflies, and skippers. Some bird species eat the seeds. Deer browse the foliage, and beavers and muskrats feed on the rhizomes. Its rhizomes and roots also provide important spawning sites for many fish species and habitat for invertebrates.

Field studies have shown that aboveground biomass of D. americana is greatly reduced by terrestrial herbivory and riparian shading, while its belowground biomass is more variable.

The creeping rhizome allows Dianthera americana to form large colonies on or near shorelines that have fluctuating water levels, a trait that has been used to support shoreline stabilization and habitat restoration efforts. Studies have shown that D. americana can be propagated from stem cuttings quite easily, and is able to produce new shoots and roots under a range of moisture conditions.

Dense plots of the American water-willow were once associated with mosquito breeding, which led to efforts to control the plant in the 1930s. This included manipulating water levels and using herbicides. Sodium arsenite-carbonate mixtures and sodium chlorate were thought to be the most effective at the time.

== Invasiveness and threats ==
D. americana can form extensive and fast-growing colonies that can become problematic. In some areas it is managed like a nuisance species since it can overtake shallow waters quickly.

Although it can spread quickly, the species faces some pressures. Fluctuating water levels from dams or climate changes can damage or uproot colonies. Competition from invasive plants, particularly the European Reed, also threatens the species. Severe shoreline erosion during storms, overgrazing by deer, trampling, pollution, and other recreational disturbances like boat traffic also pose threats.
