= Bentham & Hooker system =

System of plant classification

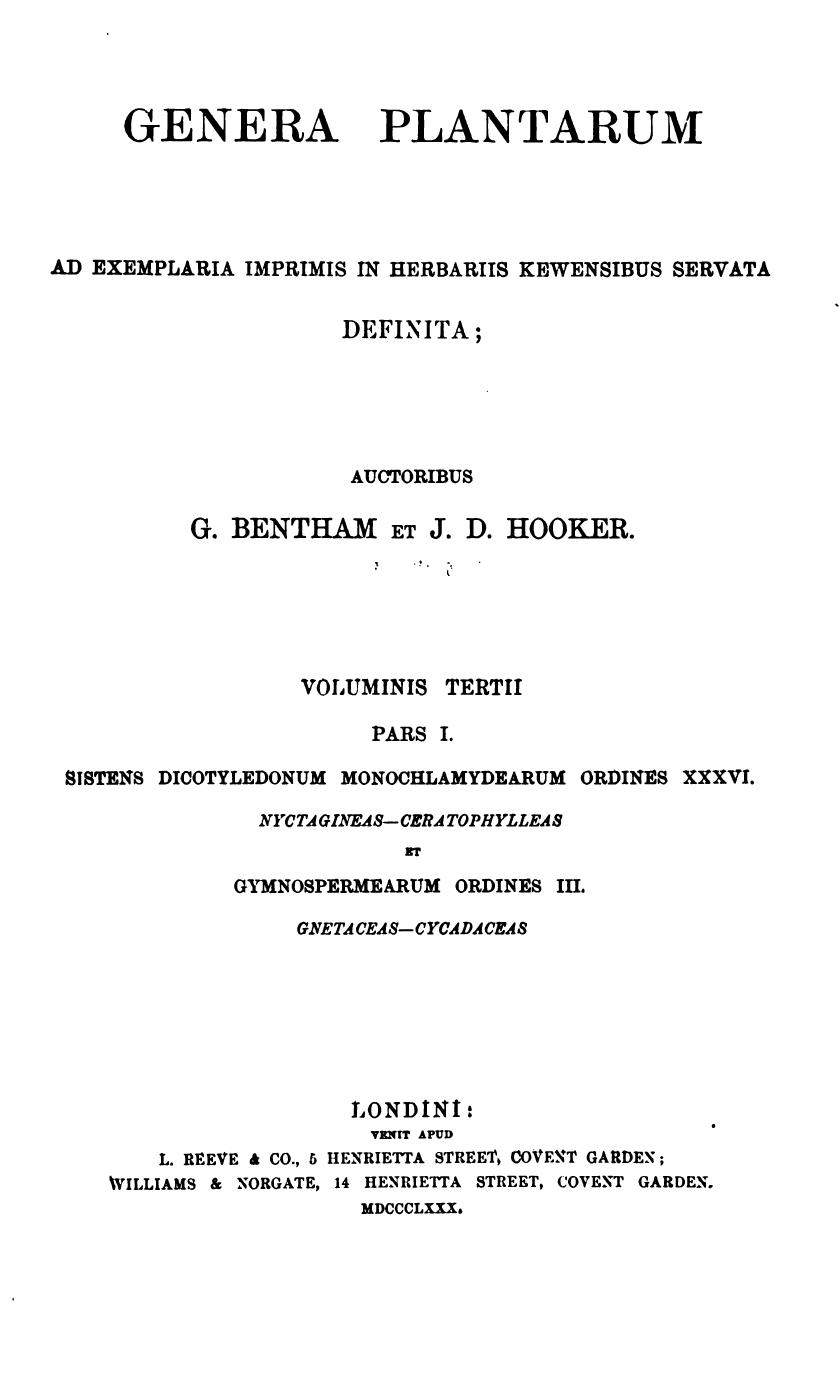
Frontispiece of 1862 edition of Genera plantarum

A taxonomic system for seed plants was published in Bentham and Hooker's Genera plantarum ad exemplaria imprimis in herbariis kewensibus servata definita in three volumes between 1862 and 1883.

George Bentham (1800–1884) and Joseph Dalton Hooker (1817–1911) were British botanists who were closely affiliated to the Royal Botanic Gardens, Kew, in England. Their system of botanical taxonomy was based on the principle of natural affinities and is considered as pre-Darwinian as it does not take evolution into account. The Genera plantarum classified an estimated 97,205 species into 202 families and 7,569 genera.

== Summary ==
The system recognises the following main groups:

- Class DICOTYLEDONES
  - DICOTYLEDONUM POLYPETALE vol I
    - Series 1. Thalamiflorae
      Series 2. Disciflorae
      Series 3. Calyciflorae
  - DICOTYLEDONES GAMOPETALÆ vol II
    - Series 1. Inferae
      Series 2. Heteromerae
      Series 3. Bicarpellatae
  - DICOTYLEDONES MONOCHLAMIDEÆ vol III
- Class GYMNOSPERMEÆ vol III (1)
- Class MONOCOTYLEDONES vol III (2)

== Families and orders in the Bentham & Hooker system ==
Note that this system was published well before there were internationally accepted rules for botanical nomenclature. It indicates a family by "ordo"; an order is indicated by "cohors" (in the first two volumes) or "series" (in the third volume); in the first two volumes “series” refers to a rank above that of order. Terminations for families are not what they are now. Neither of these phenomena is a problem from a nomenclatural perspective: the ICBN provides for this

=== Dicotyledonae ===
Dicotyledonae

- DICOTYLEDONUM POLYPETALARUM Vol I
  SERIES I THALAMIFLORÆ
  COHORS I. RANALES
  I. RANUNCULACEÆ
  II. DILLENIACEAE
  III. CALYCANTHACEÆ
  IV. MAGNOLIACEAE
  V. ANONACEAE [sic]
  VI. MENISPERMACEÆ
  VII. BERBERIDACEÆ
  VIII. NYMPHÆACEAE
  COHORS II. PARIETALES
  IX. SARRACENIACEAE
  X. PAPAVERACEAE
  XI. CRUCIFERAE
  XII. CAPPARIDEAE
  XIII. RESEDACEAE
  XIV. CISTINEAE
  XV. VIOLARIEAE p. 114 4 tribes
  XVI. CANELLACEAE
  XVII. BIXINEAE
  COHORS III. POLYGALINÆ
  XVIII. PITTOSPOREÆ
  XIX. TREMANDREAE
  XX. POLYGALAE
  XXa. VOCHYSIACEAE
  COHORS IV. CARYOPHYLLINÆ
  XXI. FRANKENIACEÆ
  XXII. CARYOPHYLLEÆ
  XXIII. PORTULACEÆ
  XXIV. TAMARISCINEÆ
  COHORS V. GUTTIFERALES
  XXV. ELATINEÆ
  XXVI. HYPERICINEÆ
  XXVII. GUTTIFERÆ
  XXVIII. TERNSTROEMIACEÆ
  XXIX. DIPTEROCARPEÆ
  XXX. CHLENACEÆ
  COHORS VI. MALVALES
  XXXI. MALVACEÆ
  XXXII. STERCULIACEÆ
  XXXIII. TILIACEÆ
  SERIES II. DISCIFLORÆ
  COHORS VII. GERANIALES
  XXXIV LINEÆ
  XXXV. HUMIRIACEÆ
  XXXVI. MALPIGHIACEÆ
  XXXVII. ZYGOPHYLLEÆ
  XXXVIII. GERANIACEÆ
  XXXIX. RUTACEÆ
  XL. SIMARUBEÆ [sic]
  XLI. OCHNACEÆ
  XLII. BURSERACEÆ
  XLIII. MELIACEÆ
  XLIV. CHAILLETIACEÆ
  COHORS VIII. OLACALES
  XLV. OLACINEÆ
  XLVI. ILICINEÆ
  COHORS IX. CELASTRALES
  XLVII. CELASTRINEÆ
  XLVIII. STACKHOUSIEÆ
  XLIX. RHAMNEÆ
  L. AMPELIDEÆ
  COHORS X. SAPINDALES
  LI. SAPINDACEÆ
  LII. SABIACEÆ
  LIII. ANACARDIACEÆ
  ORDINES V. POTIUS GENERA ANOMALA
  LIV. CORIARIEÆ
  LV. MORINGEÆ
  SERIES III. CALYCIFLORÆ
  COHORS XI. ROSALES
  LVI. CONNARACEÆ
  LVII. LEGUMINOSÆ
  LVIII. ROSACEÆ
  LIX. SAXIFRAGEÆ
  LX. CRASSULACEÆ
  LXI. DROSERACEÆ
  LXII. HAMAMELIDEÆ
  LXIII. BRUNIACEÆ
  LXIV. HALORAGEÆ
  COHORS XII. MYRTALES
  LXV. RHIZOPHOREÆ
  LXVI. COMBRETACEÆ
  LXVII. MYRTACEÆ
  LXVIII. MELASTOMACEÆ
  LXIX. LYTHRARIEÆ
  LXX. ONAGRARIEÆ
  COHORS XIII. PASSIFLORALES
  LXXI. SAMYDACEÆ
  LXXII. LOASEÆ
  LXXIII. TURNERACEÆ
  LXXIV. PASSIFLOREÆ
  LXXV. CUCURBITACEÆ
  LXXVI. BEGONIACEÆ
  LXXVII. DATISCEÆ
  COHORS XIV. FICOIDALES
  LXXVIII. CACTEÆ
  LXXIX. FICIOIDEÆ
  COHORS XV. UMBELLALES
  LXXX. UMBELLIFERÆ
  LXXXI. ARALIACEÆ
  LXXXII. CORNACEÆ
- DICOTYLEDONES GAMOPETALÆ vol II
  SERIES I. INFERÆ
  COHORS I. RUBIALES
  LXXXIII. CAPRIFOLIACEÆ
  LXXXIV. RUBIACEÆ
  COHORS II. ASTERALES
  LXXXV. VALERIANEÆ
  LXXXVI. DIPSACEÆ
  LXXXVII. CALCEREÆ
  LXXXVIII. COMPOSITÆ
  COHORS III. CAMPANALES
  LXXXIX. STYLIDIEÆ
  XC. GOODENOVIEÆ
  XCI. CAMPANULACEÆ
  SERIES II. HETEROMERÆ
  COHORS IV ERICALES
  XCII. VACCINIACEÆ
  XCIII. ERICACEÆ
  XCIV. MONOTROPEÆ
  XCV. EPACRIDEÆ
  XCVI. DIAPENSIACEÆ
  XCVII. LENNOACEÆ
  COHORS V. PRIMULALES
  XCVIII. PLUMBAGINEÆ
  XCIX. PRIMULACEÆ
  C. MYRSINEÆ
  COHORS VI. EBENALES
  CI. SAPOTACEÆ
  CII. EBENACEÆ
  CIII. STYRACEÆ
  SERIES III. BICARPELLATÆ
  COHORS VII. GENTIANALES
  CIV. OLEACEÆ
  CV. SALVADORACEÆ
  CVI. APOCYNACEÆ
  CVII. ASCLEPIADEÆ
  CVIII. LOGANIACEÆ
  CIX. GENTIANEÆ
  COHORS VIII. POLEMONIALES
  CX. POLEMONIACEÆ
  CXI. HYDROPHYLLACEÆ
  CXII. BORAGINEÆ
  CXIII. CONVOLVULACEÆ
  CXIV. SOLANACEÆ
  COHORS IX. PERSONALES
  CXV. SCROPHULARINEÆ
  CXVI. OROBRANCHACEÆ
  CXVII. LENTIBULARIEÆ
  CXVIII. COLUMELLIACEÆ
  CXIX. GESNERACEÆ [sic]
  CXX. BIGNONIACEÆ
  CXXI. PEDALINEÆ
  CXXII. ACANTHACEÆ
  COHORS X. LAMIALES
  CXXIII. MYOPORINEÆ
  CXXIV. SELAGINEÆ
  CXXV. VERBENACEÆ
  CXXVI. LABIATÆ
  incertae sedis
  CXXVII. PLANTAGINEÆ
- DICOTYLEDONES MONOCHLAMIDEÆ vol III
  Series I. Curvembryeæ
  CXXVIII. NYCTAGINEÆ
  CXXIX. ILLECEBRACEÆ
  CXXX. AMARANTACEÆ [sic]
  CXXXI. CHENOPODIACEÆ
  CXXXII. PHYTOLACCACEÆ
  CXXXIII. BATIDEÆ
  CXXXIV. POLYGONACEÆ
  Series II. Multiovulatæ Aquaticæ
  CXXXV. PODOSTEMONACEÆ
  Series III. Multiovulatæ Terrestres
  CXXXVI. NEPENTHACEÆ
  CXXXVII. CYTINACEÆ
  CXXXVIII. ARISTOLOCHIACEÆ
  Series IV. Microembryeæ
  CXXXIX. PIPERACEÆ
  CXL. CHLORANTACEÆ
  CXLI. MYRISTICEÆ
  CXLII. MONIMIACEÆ
  Series V. Daphnales
  CXLIII. LAURINEÆ
  CXLIV. PROTEACEÆ
  CXLV. THYMELÆACEÆ
  CXLVI. PENÆACEÆ
  CXLVII. ELÆAGNACEÆ
  Series VI. Achlamydosporeæ
  CXLVIII. LORANTHACEÆ
  CXLIX. SANTALACEÆ
  CL. BALANOPHOREÆ
  Series VII. Unisexuales
  CLI. EUPHORBIACEÆ
  CLII. BALANOPEÆ
  CLIII. URTICACEÆ
  CLIV. PLATANACEÆ
  CLV. LEITNERIEÆ
  CLVI. JUGLANDEÆ
  CLVII. MYRICACEÆ
  CLVIII. CASUARINEÆ
  CLIX. CUPULIFERÆ
  Series VIII. Ordines anomali (incertae sedis)
  CLX. SALICINEÆ
  CLXI. LACISTEMACEÆ
  CLXII. EMPETRACEÆ
  CLXIII. CERATOPHYLLEÆ
- 'GYMNOSPERMEÆ [sic] vol III (1)
  CLXIV. GNETACEÆ
  CLXV. CONIFERÆ
  CLXVI. CYCADACEÆ

=== Gymnosperms ===
- vol III
- Family:-

1> Gnetaceae 2> Coniferae 3> Cycadaceae

=== Monocotyledons ===
Monocotyledons

- Summary pp viii–xi
- MONOCOTYLEDONES vol III (2) p. 448

==== Series I. Microspermæ p. 448 ====
- CLXVII. HYDROCHARIDEÆp. 448
  CLXVIII. BURMANNIACEÆ
  CLXIX. ORCHIDEÆ p. 460

==== Series II Epigynæ p. 636 ====
- CLXX. SCITAMINEÆ p. 636
  CLXXI. BROMELIACEÆ p. 657
  CLXXII. HAEMODORACEÆ p. 671
  CLXXIII. IIRIDEÆ p. 681 3 tribes
  CLXXIV. AMARYLLIDEÆ p. 711 5 tribes
  I Tribus Hypoxideae p. 716
  II Tribus Amarylleae p. 718 3 subtribes
  III Tribus Alstroemerieae p. 735
  IV Tribus Agaveae p. 737
  V Tribus Vellosieae p. 739
  CLXXV. TACCACEÆ p. 740
  CLXXVI. DIOSCOREACEÆ p. 741

==== Series III Coronarieæ p. 746 ====
- CLXXVII. ROXBURGHIACEÆ p. 746
  CLXXVIII. LILIACEÆ p. 748 (20 tribes) Schema 748–763
  Tribus I Smilaceae p. 763
  Tribus II Asparageae p. 764
  Tribus III Luzuriageae
  Tribus IV Polygonateae p. 768
  Tribus V Convallariae
  Tribus VI Aspidistreae
  Tribus VII Hemerocalleae
  Tribus VIII Aloineae
- ...
  Tribus X Asphodeleae p. 781 5 subtribes
  Tribus XI Johnsonieae p. 795
  Tribus XII Allieae p. 798 Schema p. 750 4 subtribes
  Subtribus I Agapantheae p. 798
  Subtribus II Euallieae p. 798
  Subtribus III Gilliesieae p. 804
  Subtribus IV Massonieae p. 806
  Tribus XIII Scilleae p. 807
  Tribus XIV Tulipeae p. 816
  Tribus XV Colchiceae
- ...
  Tribus XX Veratreae p. 834
  CLXXIX. PONTEDERIACEÆ p. 836
  CLXXX. PHILYDRACEÆ p. 840
  CLXXXI. XYRIDEÆ p. 841
  CLXXXII. MAYACEÆ p. 843
  CLXXXIII. COMMELINACEÆ p. 844
  CLXXXIV. RAPATEACEÆ p. 857

==== Series VI Calycineæ p. 860 ====
- CLXXXV. FLAGELLARIEÆ
  CLXXXVI. JUNCACEÆ
  CLXXXVII. PALMÆ

==== Series V. Nudifloreæ p. 949 ====
- CLXXXVIII. PANDANEÆ
  CLXXXIX. CYCLANTHACEÆ
  CXC TYPHACEÆ
  CXCI. AROIDEÆ
  CXCII. LEMNACEÆ p. 1000

==== Series VI. Apocarpæ p.1001 ====
- CXCIII. TRIURIDEÆ
  CXCIV. ALISMACEÆ p. 1003
  CXCV. NAIADACEÆ [sic]

==== Series VII. Glumaceæ p. 1019 ====
- CXCVI. ERIOCAULEÆ
  CXCVII. CENTROLEPIDEÆ p. 1025
  CXCVIII. RESTIACEÆ
  CXCIX. CYPERACEÆ
  CC. GRAMINEÆ

== See also ==
- Gamopetalae
- Heteromerae
- Monochlamydeae

== Bibliography ==
- Bentham, G.; Hooker, J.D. (1862–1883). Genera plantarum ad exemplaria imprimis in herbariis kewensibus servata definita (3 vols.). London: L Reeve & Co.
  - 1 Part 1 Index p.441
- Bentham, George (February 1877). "On the Distribution of the Monocotyledonous Orders into Primary Groups, more especially in reference to the Australian Flora, with notes on some points of Terminology". Journal of the Linnean Society of London, Botany. 15 (88): 490–520. doi:10.1111/j.1095-8339.1877.tb00261.x.
- Singh, Gurcharan (2010). Plant Systematics: An Integrated Approach (3 ed.). Science Publishers. ISBN 978-1578083510.
