= Bicarpellatae =

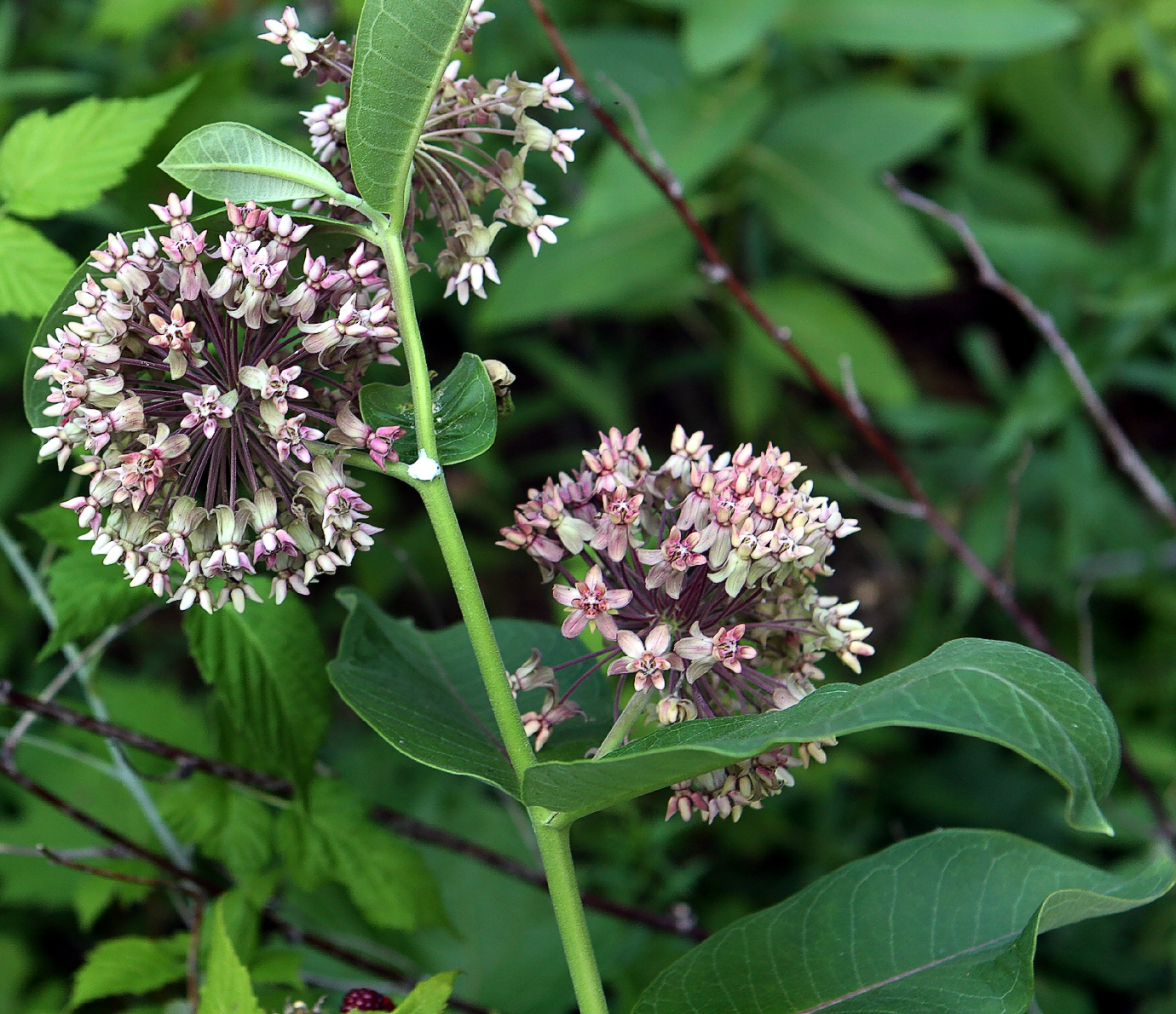
Milkweed, family of Bicarpellatae.

Bicarpellatae is an artificial group used in the identification of plants based on Bentham and Hooker's classification system. George Bentham and Joseph Dalton Hooker published an excellent classification in three volumes in between 1862 and 1883. As a natural system of classification, it does not show evolutionary relationship between plants but still is a useful and popular system of classification based on a dichotomous key especially for the flowering plant groups (angiosperms). It is the most popular system of classification based on key characteristics enabling taxonomic students to quickly identify plant groups based only on physical characteristics. However, it is not a scientific group and is used for identification purposes only based on similar plant characteristics. Under the system Bicarpellatae are a group of plants based on an artificial and non scientific series. The group Bicarpellatea are Gamopetalae and dicotyledons. The group comprises;

- Flowers with petals fused with the calyx and corolla with a superior ovary and two carpels.

== Previous Order ==
- Dicotyledons, Gamopetalae
