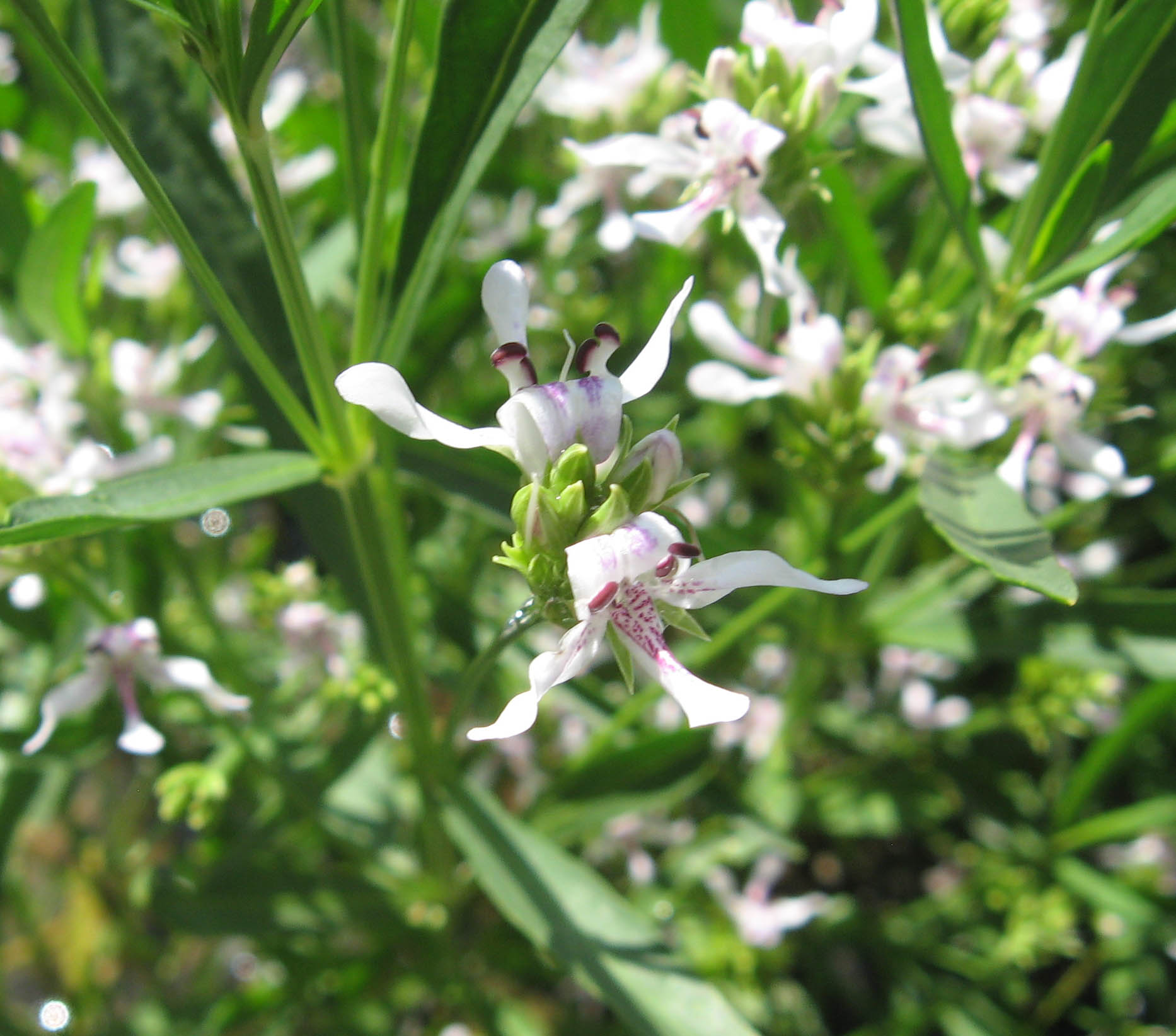
- Dianthera americana

Scientific classification
- Kingdom: Plantae
- Clade: Tracheophytes
- Clade: Angiosperms
- Clade: Eudicots
- Clade: Asterids
- Order: Lamiales
- Family: Acanthaceae
- Genus: Dianthera; L. (1753)

Species
- 41; see text

Synonyms
- Amphiscopia Nees (1832); Centrilla Lindau (1900); Diplanthera Gled. (1764), nom. superfl.; Jungia Boehm. (1760), nom. superfl.; Plagiacanthus Nees (1847); Psacadocalymma Bremek. (1948); Rhacodiscus Lindau (1897); Rodatia Raf. (1840); Stethoma Raf. (1838)

= Dianthera =

Genus of flowering plants

Dianthera is a genus of flowering plants in the family Acanthaceae. It includes 41 species native to the Americas, ranging from eastern Canada to northern Argentina.

== Species ==
41 species are accepted.

- Dianthera americana L.
- Dianthera androsaemifolia (Nees) Griseb.
- Dianthera angusta (Chapm.) Small
- Dianthera angustifolia (Nees) Benth. & Hook.f. ex B.D.Jacks.
- Dianthera appendiculata Ruiz & Pav.
- Dianthera arvensis Vell.
- Dianthera brasiliensis Vell.
- Dianthera breviflora (Nees) Hemsl.
- Dianthera calycina (Nees) B.D.Jacks.
- Dianthera candelariae (Oerst.) Hemsl.
- Dianthera candicans (Nees) Benth. & Hook.f. ex Hemsl.
- Dianthera cayennensis (Nees) Griseb.
- Dianthera comata L.
- Dianthera crassifolia Chapm.
- Dianthera dasyclados (Mart. ex Nees) Hiern
- Dianthera eustachiana (Jacq.) J.F.Gmel.
- Dianthera glabra (Oerst.) Benth. & Hook.f. ex Hemsl.
- Dianthera guianensis N.E.Br.
- Dianthera hookeriana (Nees) Benth. & Hook.f. ex B.D.Jacks.
- Dianthera inaequalis (Benth.) Benth. & Hook.f. ex B.D.Jacks.
- Dianthera incerta Brandegee
- Dianthera laeta (Nees) Hiern
- Dianthera laevilinguis (Nees) Lindau
- Dianthera lindeniana (Nees) Hemsl.
- Dianthera longiflora (Nees) Benth. & Hook.f. ex B.D.Jacks.
- Dianthera oblonga (Nees) Benth. & Hook.f. ex B.D.Jacks.
- Dianthera ovata Walter
- Dianthera pectoralis (Jacq.) J.F.Gmel.
- Dianthera peploides Griseb.
- Dianthera pleurolarynx S.F.Blake
- Dianthera polygaloides S.Moore
- Dianthera racemosa (Ruiz & Pav.) Benth. & Hook.f. ex B.D.Jacks.
- Dianthera reptans (Sw.) J.F.Gmel.
- Dianthera rigida (Nees) Benth. & Hook.f. ex B.D.Jacks.
- Dianthera rugeliana Griseb.
- Dianthera sagrana (A.Rich.) Griseb.
- Dianthera secunda (Lam.) Griseb.
- Dianthera secundiflora Ruiz & Pav.
- Dianthera sessilis (Jacq.) J.F.Gmel.
- Dianthera speciosa (Nees) Benth. & Hook.f. ex B.D.Jacks.
- Dianthera sulfurea Donn.Sm.
