= Disciflorae =

Group of flowering plants

Disciflorae are an artificial group of plants based on the old second artificial and non scientific series. The group Disciflorae are polypetalae and dicotyledonous. The group comprises:

- Flowers having prominent disc shaped thalamus below the ovary. The ovary is superior.

== Previous Order ==
- Polypetalae, Dicotyledons
