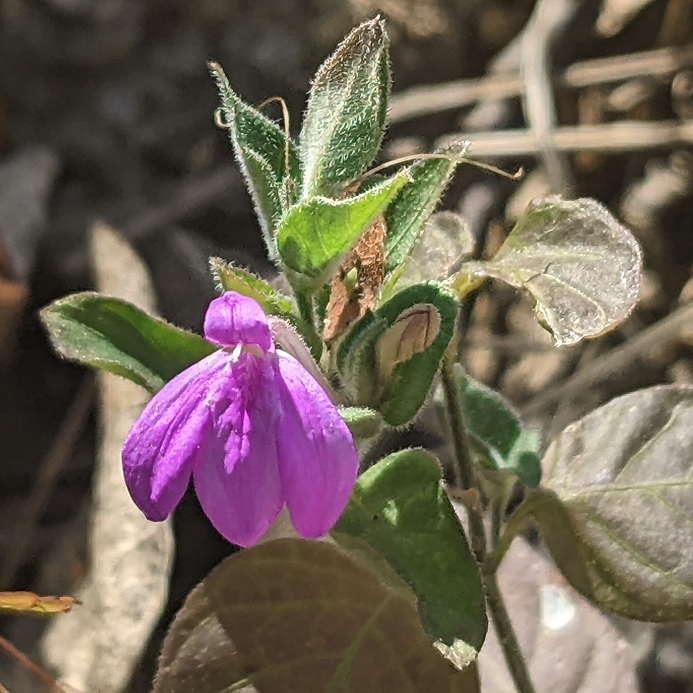

Scientific classification
- Kingdom: Plantae
- Clade: Tracheophytes
- Clade: Angiosperms
- Clade: Eudicots
- Clade: Asterids
- Order: Lamiales
- Family: Acanthaceae
- Genus: Dianthera
- Species: D. incerta

Binomial name
- Dianthera incerta Brandegee (1892 publ. 1893)

Synonyms
- Justicia austrocapensis T.F. Daniel (1997); Siphonoglossa incerta (Brandegee) Hilsenb. (1979)

= Dianthera incerta =

Cape tube-tongue

Species of flowering plant

Dianthera incerta is a species of perennial herb in the Acanthus family commonly known as the Cape tube-tongue or chuparrosa. D. incerta is characterized by solitary, pink, two-lipped tubular flowers up to 27 mm (1.1 in) long that emerge from the leaf axils. It is endemic to the Cape region of Baja California Sur, and was formerly placed within Justicia. It is most similar to other species formerly placed in Siphonoglossa, such as Dianthera sessilis of the West Indies and South America.

== Description ==
Dianthera incerta is a perennial herb that grows to 1 m (3.3 ft) tall. The young stems are square-shaped and may be furrowed. The foliage, stems, flowers and fruits are covered in pubescent, non-glandular hairs. The leaves are subsessile to petiolate, with the petioles up to 6 mm (0.24 in) long, eventually reducing to stubs along the stem 2 mm (0.079 in) once the leaves have fallen. The leaves are ovate and entire, measuring 1.6–5.5 cm (0.63–2.17 in) long by 3.5–4.4 cm (1.4–1.7 in) wide. The tip of the leaf is acute to acuminate, while the base of the leaf is acute to cordate to truncate.

Flowering and fruiting is from September to December and April to May. The inflorescence is a dichasia emerging from the axils of the leaves (with the distal leaves sometimes being reduced and bract-like), usually bearing a solitary flower. The dichasia is subsessile to sessile, with a short peduncle only up to 1 mm (0.039 in) long. The bracteoles are sessile and reach up to 5.5 mm (0.22 in) long. The flowers are sessile, and have a 4-lobed calyx 3–7 cm (1.2–2.8 in) long. The two-lipped corolla is a rose-pink with a white and darker-pink crow's-foot shaped pattern on the spreading lower lip. The corolla measures up to 27 mm (1.1 in) long, and the corolla tube 14–17 mm (0.55–0.67 in) long.

The fruit is a capsule 9–13.5 mm (0.35–0.53 in) long, held on a stipe up to 4.5 mm (0.18 in) long. There are 4 seeds, each up to 3 mm (0.12 in) long, white in immaturity, turning brown when mature.

== Distribution and habitat ==
Dianthera incerta is endemic to the Cape region of Baja California Sur, the far southern portion of the peninsula characterized by the Sierra de la Laguna and the San Lucan scrub. It is found in the non-desert portions of the mountains and lowlands of the Cape. D. incerta is usually associated with the tropical deciduous forest and pine-oak forests of the region at elevations of 460–1,230 m (1,510–4,040 ft). It usually occurs on slopes, along watercourses, and in canyons and gulches.
