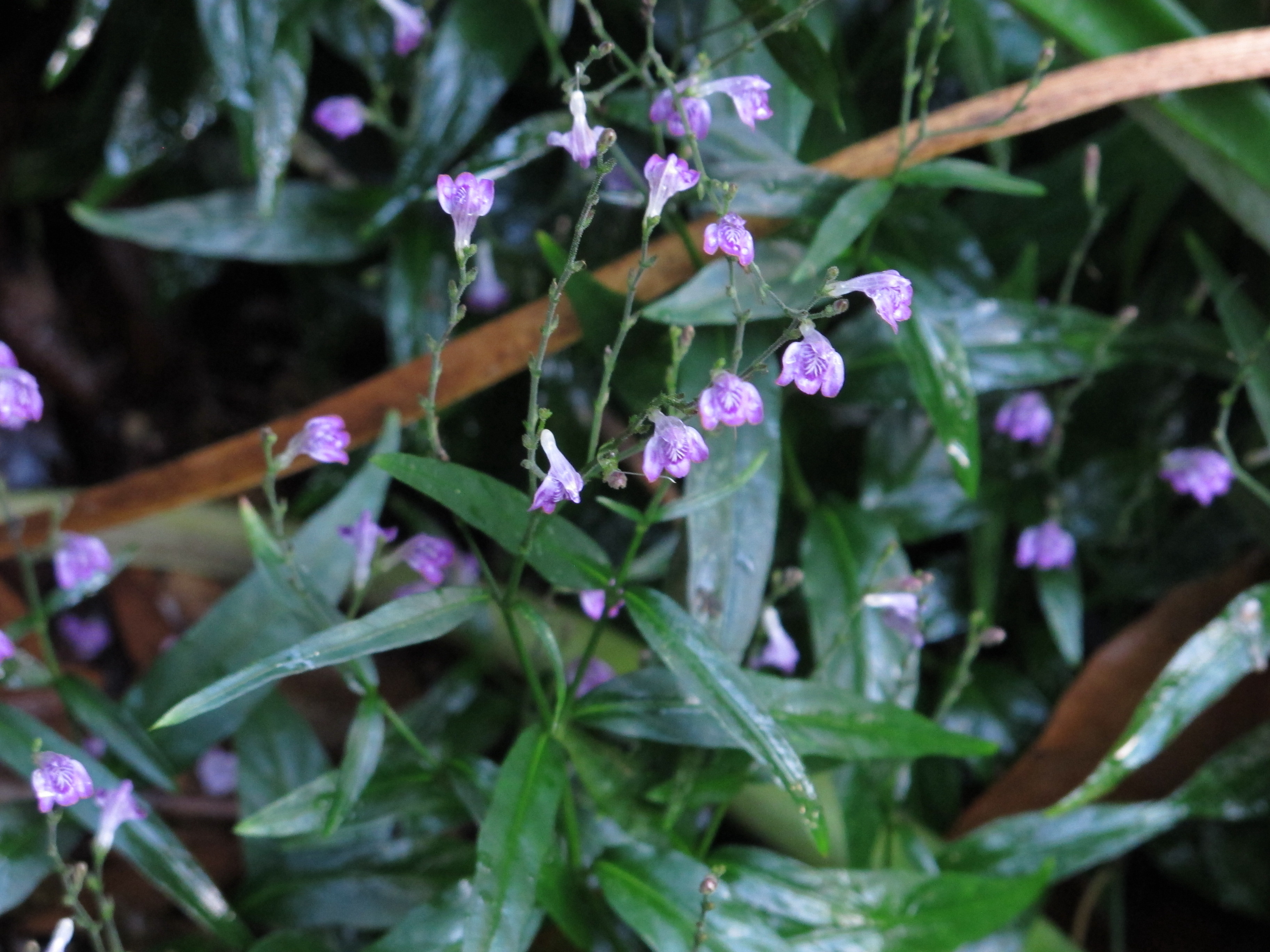

Scientific classification
- Kingdom: Plantae
- Clade: Tracheophytes
- Clade: Angiosperms
- Clade: Eudicots
- Clade: Asterids
- Order: Lamiales
- Family: Acanthaceae
- Genus: Dianthera
- Species: D. pectoralis

Binomial name
- Dianthera pectoralis (Jacq.) J.F.Gmel. (1791)

Synonyms
- Ecbolium pectorale (Jacq.) Kuntze (1891); Ecbolium willdenowii Kuntze (1891); Justicia pectoralis Jacq. (1760); Justicia pectoralis var. latifolia Bremek. (1938); Justicia pectoralis var. macrophyllus Durkee (1978); Justicia pectoralis var. ovata Wassh. (1977); Justicia pectoralis var. stenophylla Leonard (1958); Justicia procumbens T.Anderson ex Nees (1847), not validly publ.; Justicia stuebelii Lindau (1896); Leptostachya pectoralis (Jacq.) Nees & Mart. (1839); Psacadocalymma pectorale (Jacq.) Bremek. (1948); Rhytiglossa pectoralis (Jacq.) Nees (1845); Rhytiglossa pectoralis var. monostachya Nees (1847); Rhytiglossa scabra Nees (1847); Stethoma pectoralis (Jacq.) Raf. (1838)

= Dianthera pectoralis =

Species of flowering plant

Dianthera pectoralis is an herb in the family Acanthaceae. This water-willow is widely known as tilo in Latin America and in Cuba. In Haiti, it is called chapantye and zeb chapantyè on Dominica and Martinique. Other folk names are freshcut, chambá carpintero ("carpenter"), té criollo ("Criollo tea"), curia, death-angel, masha-hari, or "piri piri". This species was described by Nikolaus Joseph von Jacquin in 1760, who provided additional data in 1763. A well-marked variety, var. stenophylla, was described by Emery Clarence Leonard in 1958.

== Uses ==
=== Traditional uses ===
Across its range, it is used in folk medicine as a relaxant and general tonic. Additionally, it is often used in preparation of ayahuasca, a South American psychoactive brew.

=== Other uses ===
As regards other applications, it is noted for its pleasant smell and as a source of coumarin, which it produces in plenty, and which in combination with umbelliferone is responsible for many of its notable properties. It is also admixed to epená (Virola) snuff to make it smell more pleasant. In particular var. stenophylla might also be hallucinogenic in certain preparations; it is known to wajacas (shamans) of the Krahô tribe in Brazil, who know that variety as mashi-hiri and consider it a potent entheogen, not to be taken by the uninitiated. The wajacas (shamans) refer to the leaves of the Dianthera pectoralis var. stenophylla as bolek-bena meaning "Leaves of the Angel of Death". Its name likely comes from the fact it has killed three curanderos.

== Etymology ==
The name "tilo" could be by association with Tilia, the linden trees. These are entirely unrelated eudicots whose flowers have similar relaxant properties. The water-"willows" are not relatives of the true willows either; like the lindens, the latter belong to the rosid branch of the eudicots.

== Bibliography ==
- Comisión Técnica de Fitomed (CTF) [2003]: Tilo [in Spanish]. Retrieved 2008-11-01.
- Tilo (in Spanish), Consultas Medicas. Retrieved June 2010.
- United States Department of Agriculture (USDA) (2006a): Germplasm Resources Information Network – Justicia pectoralis. Version of 2006-08-04. Retrieved 2008-04-04.
