= Dianthera angustifolia =

Scientific classification
- Kingdom: Plantae
- Clade: Tracheophytes
- Clade: Angiosperms
- Clade: Eudicots
- Clade: Asterids
- Order: Lamiales
- Family: Acanthaceae
- Genus: Dianthera
- Species: D. angustifolia

Binomial name
- Dianthera angustifolia (Nees) Benth. & Hook.f. ex B.D.Jacks. (1893)

Synonyms
- Ecbolium angustifolium (Nees) Kuntze (1891); Justicia angustifolia (Nees) Lindau (1895); Rhytiglossa angustifolia Nees (1847); Rhytiglossa angustifolia var. compactior Nees (1847)

Species of flowering plant

Dianthera angustifolia is a species of flowering plant native to the Cerrado ecoregion of central Brazil.

== See also ==
- List of plants of Cerrado vegetation of Brazil
