= Heteromerae =

Group of flowering plants

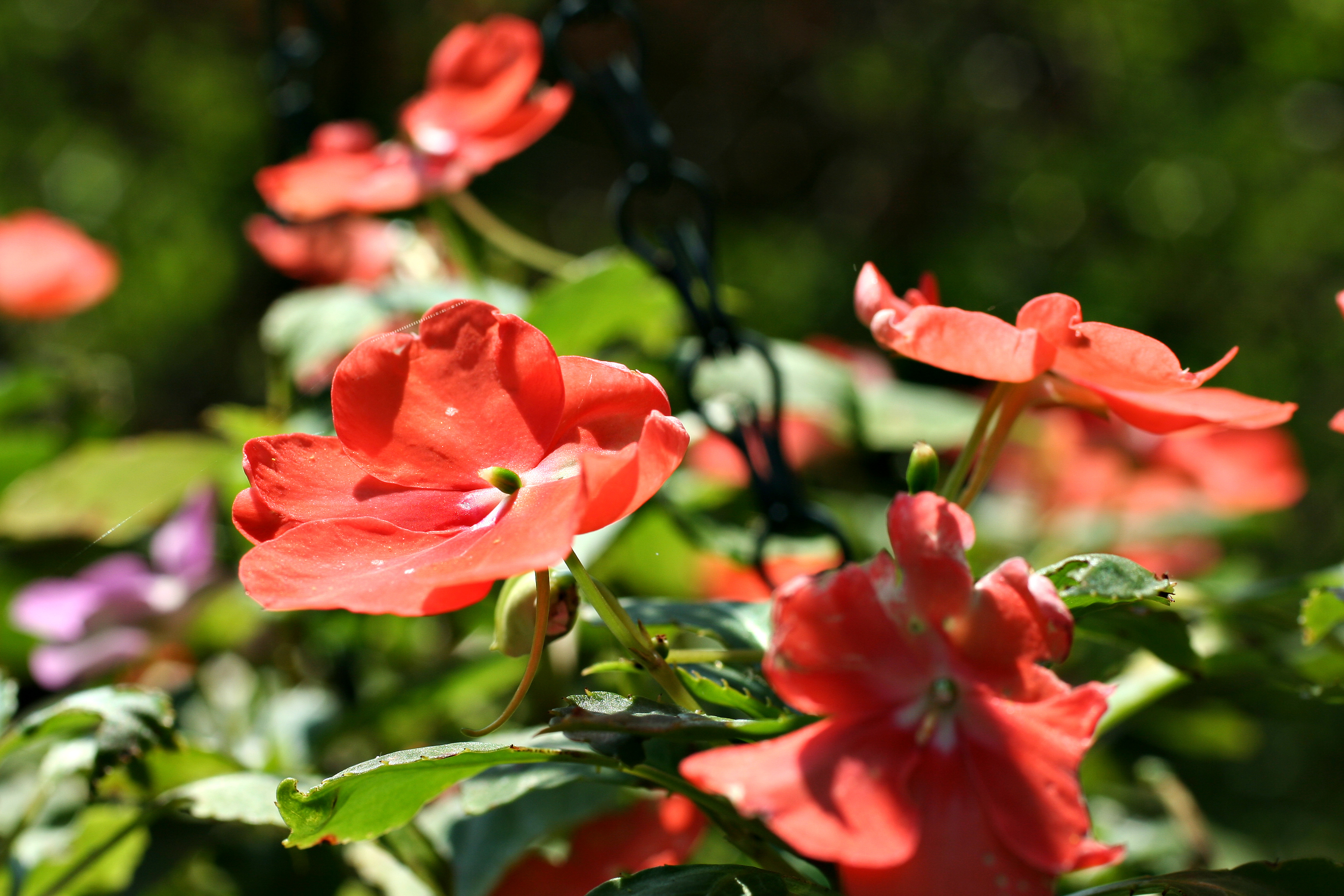
Impatiens, Busy Lizzie one plant from Bentham and Hooker's Heteromerae

Heteromerae is an artificial group used in the identification of plants based on Bentham and Hooker classification system. Bentham and Hooker published an excellent classification in three volumes between 1862 and 1883. As a natural system of classification, it does not show evolutionary relationship between plants but still is a useful and popular system of classification based on a dichotomous key. It is the most popular system of classification especially for the flowering plant groups (angiosperms) based on key characteristics. This enables taxonomic students to quickly identify plant groups based only on physical characteristics. Under the system Heteromerae is a Sub Class, Series ii and it is often not used. The series comprises;

- Flowers with superior ovary and more than two carpels

== Previous Sub Division ==
- Sub Class 1 Dicotyledons or Exogens

== See also ==
- For an illustrated summary of Gamopetalae, see botanic gardens information
