= Sweetbay Natural Area =

Protected area in Florida, US

Coordinates: 26°51.432′N 80°14.092′W

Sweetbay Natural Area is a 1,094 acre protected area of wetlands, pine flatwoods, and oak hammock in Palm Beach Gardens, Florida. The habitats provide sanctuary for wading birds, red-shouldered hawks, bobcats, eastern lubber grasshoppers, and Florida box turtles. Sweetbay Natural Area is located at 12560 Aviation Boulevard inside the North County Airport off Bee Line Highway, one mile north of PGA Boulevard.
