= Gamopetalae =

Unranked group of plants

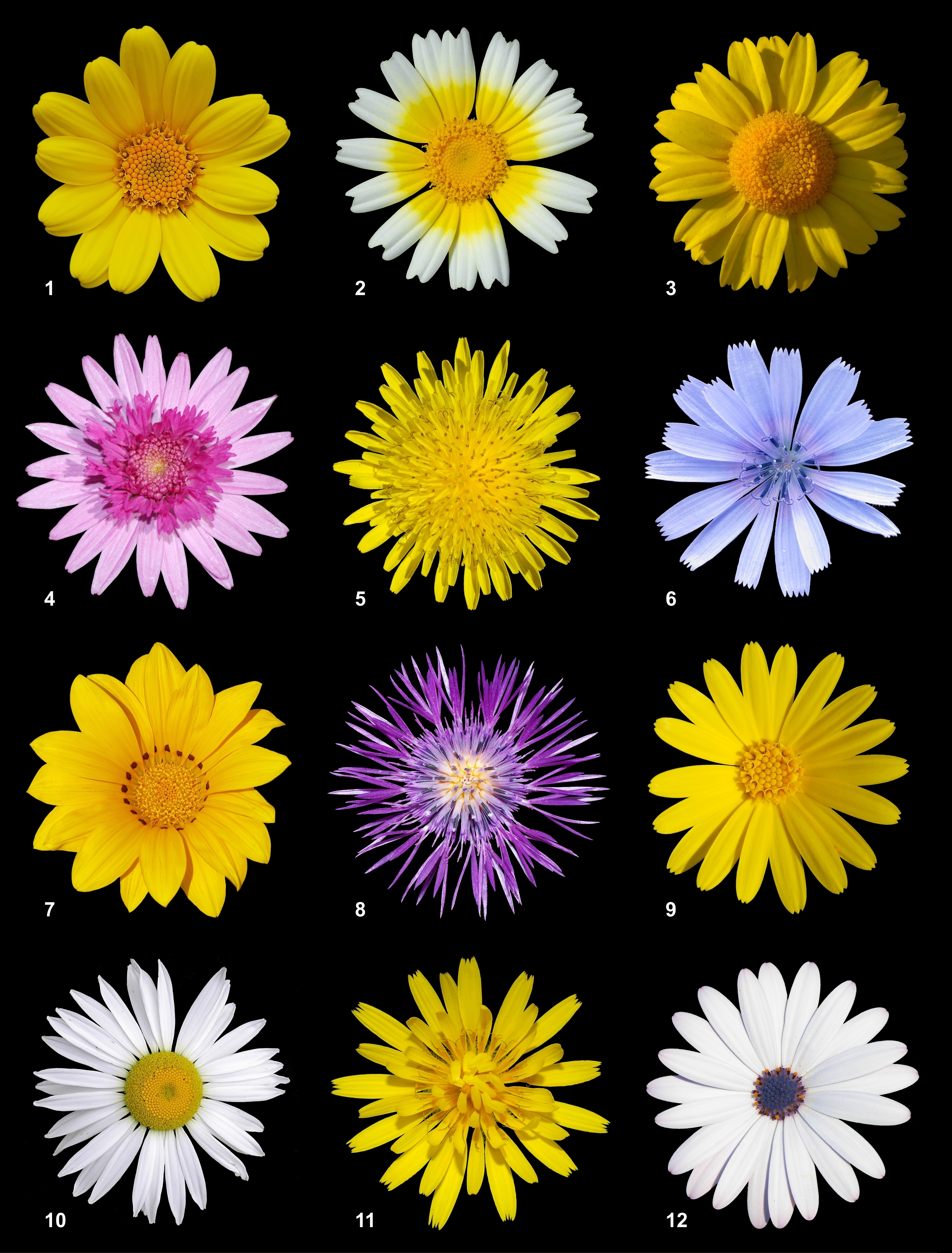
12 species of Asteraceae under Bentham and Hooker's Gamopetalae

Gamopetalae is an artificial historical group used in the identification of plants based on Bentham and Hooker's classification system.

== Use by Bentham and Hooker ==
George Bentham and Joseph Dalton Hooker published this as Genera plantarum ad exemplaria imprimis in herbariis kewensibus servata definita in three volumes between 1862 and 1883. As a natural system of classification, it does not reflect evolutionary relationships between plants but was a useful and popular system of classification based on a dichotomous key especially for the flowering plant groups (angiosperms). It was based on key characteristics enabling taxonomic students to quickly identify plant groups based only on physical characteristics. However, it is not a scientific group and is used for identification purposes only based on similar plant characteristics. They divided the dicotyledon class into three subclasses;

- Polypetalae (Dicotyledones polypetale)
- Gamopetalae (Dicotyledones gamopetalae)
- Monochlamydeae (Dicotyledones monochlamydeae)

Under that system Gamopetalae is a Sub Class and comprises;

- Flowers with distinct calyx and corolla. The petals are joined in the corolla.

== Previous Sub Division ==
- Sub Class 1 Dicotyledons or Exogens

== See also ==
- Heteromerae
- Monochlamydae
