= Daucus carota =

Conservation status
- Least Concern (IUCN 3.1)

Scientific classification
- Kingdom: Plantae
- Clade: Tracheophytes
- Clade: Angiosperms
- Clade: Eudicots
- Clade: Asterids
- Order: Apiales
- Family: Apiaceae
- Genus: Daucus
- Species: D. carota

Binomial name
- Daucus carota L.

Infraspecific taxa
- See text

Synonyms
- List: Ballimon maritimum (Lam.) Raf.; Carota sativa (Hoffm.) Rupr.; Carota sylvestris (Mill.) Lobel ex Rupr.; Caucalis carnosa Roth; Caucalis carota (L.) Crantz; Caucalis daucus Crantz; Caucalis gingidium (L.) Crantz; Caucalis hispanica Crantz; Caucalis pumila Willd.; Daucus abyssinicus C.A.Mey.; Daucus agrestis Raf.; Daucus alatus Poir.; Daucus allionii Link; Daucus annuus (Bég.) Wojew., Reduron, Banasiak & Spalik; Daucus asturiarum Barnadez ex Cutanda; Daucus australis Guss.; Daucus australis Kotov; Daucus blanchei Reut.; Daucus bocconei Guss.; Daucus brevicaulis Raf.; Daucus capillifolius Gilli; Daucus carnosus Moench; Daucus carota var. acaulis (Bréb.) P.D.Sell; Daucus carota subsp. boissieri (Schweinf.) Hosni; Daucus carota var. brachycaulos Reduron; Daucus carota f. epurpuratus Farw.; Daucus carota f. fischeri Moldenke; Daucus carota var. fontanesii (Thell.) Reduron; Daucus carota f. goodmanii Moldenke; Daucus carota var. gummifer Syme; Daucus carota var. linearis Reduron; Daucus carota var. pseudocarota (Rouy & E.G.Camus) Reduron; Daucus carota f. roseus Farw.; Daucus carota f. roseus Millsp.; Daucus carota var. tenuisectus (Degen ex Palyi) Reduron; Daucus communis Rouy & E.G.Camus; Daucus communis var. pseudocarota Rouy & E.G.Camus; Daucus commutatus (Paol.) Thell.; Daucus dentatus Bertol.; Daucus drepanensis (Arcang.) Tod. ex Lojac.; Daucus esculentus Salisb.; Daucus exiguus Steud.; Daucus foliosus Guss.; Daucus gadecaei (Rouy & E.G.Camus) Rouy & E.G.Camus; Daucus gibbosus Bertol.; Daucus gingidium Georgi; Daucus gingidium L.; Daucus gingidium subsp. atlanticus Rivas Mart.; Daucus gingidium subsp. commutatus (Prolongo) O.Bolòs & Vigo; Daucus gingidium subsp. hispanicus (Gouan) O.Bolòs & Vigo; Daucus gingidium subsp. majoricus (A.Pujadas) Mart.Flores, Juan, M.A.Alonso, A.Pujadas & M.B.Crespo; Daucus gouanii Nyman; Daucus gummifer All.; Daucus gummifer Lam.; Daucus gummifer var. acaulis Bréb.; Daucus gummifer var. intermedius Corb.; Daucus halophilus Brot.; Daucus herculeus Pau; Daucus heterophylus Raf.; Daucus hispanicus Gouan; Daucus hispidus Desf.; Daucus hispidus Gilib.; Daucus hispidus Mill.; Daucus hispidus var. tenuisectus Degen ex Palyi; Daucus jolensis Pomel; Daucus kotovii M.Hiroe; Daucus levis Raf.; Daucus lucidus L.f.; Daucus marcidus Timb.-Lagr.; Daucus maritimus Lam.; Daucus maritimus With.; Daucus martellii Gand. ex Calest.; Daucus masclefii Corb.; Daucus matthiolii Bubani; Daucus mauritanicus L.; Daucus mauritanicus Salzm. ex DC.; Daucus maximus Desf.; Daucus micranthus Pomel; Daucus montanus Schmidt ex Nyman; Daucus nebrodensis Strobl; Daucus neglectus Lowe; Daucus nitidus Gasp.; Daucus nudicaulis Raf.; Daucus officinalis Gueldenst. ex Ledeb.; Daucus paralias Pomel; Daucus parviflorus Desf.; Daucus polygamus Gouan; Daucus polygamus Jacq. ex Nyman; Daucus rupestris Guss.; Daucus russeus Heldr.; Daucus sativus (Hoffm.) Röhl. ex Pass.; Daucus scariosus Raf.; Daucus sciadophylus Raf.; Daucus serotinus Pomel; Daucus serratus Moris; Daucus siculus Tineo; Daucus strigosus Raf.; Daucus sylvestris Mill.; Daucus tenuissimus (A.Chev.) Spalik, Wojew., Banasiak & Reduron; Daucus vulgaris Garsault; Daucus vulgaris Lam.; Daucus vulgaris Neck.; Melanoselinum annuum (Bég.) A.Chev.; Melanoselinum tenuissimum A.Chev.; Peltactila hispida Raf.; Peltactila parviflora (Desf.) Raf.; Platyspermum alatum (Poir.) Schult.; Thapsia annua (A.Chev.) M.Hiroe; Thapsia tenuissima (A.Chev.) M.Hiroe; Tiricta daucoides Raf.; Tornabenea annua Bég.; Tornabenea tenuissima (A.Chev.) A.Hansen & Sunding

Species of flowering plant

Daucus carota, whose common names include wild carrot, European wild carrot, bird's nest, bishop's lace, carrot flower, and Queen Anne's lace (North America), is a flowering plant in the family Apiaceae. It is native to temperate regions of Afro-Eurasia with a number of regional subspecies, and is naturalised widely elsewhere. Carrots cultivated as a food crop are cultivars of the domesticated subspecies Daucus carota subsp. sativus.

== Description ==
The wild carrot is a herbaceous, somewhat variable biennial plant that grows to 30–100 cm (1–3 ft), rarely 120 cm (4 ft) tall, and is roughly hairy, with a stiff, solid stem. The leaves are tripinnate, finely divided and lacy, and overall triangular in shape. The leaves are 5–15 cm (2–6 in) long, bristly and alternate in a pinnate pattern that separates into thin segments. The flowers are small and dull white, clustered in flat, dense umbels. The umbels are terminal and about 8–15 cm (3–6 in) wide. They may be pink in bud and may have one (rarely a few) pink, reddish or purple flower (the "ruby") in the centre of the umbel. There are 7–13 bracts below the umbel; these are three-forked or pinnate, which distinguishes the plant from other white-flowered umbellifers. As the seeds develop, the umbel curls up at the edges, becomes more congested, and develops a concave surface. The fruit is a small, dry, bumpy, oval and flattened carpel 2.5–4 mm long, with short styles and hooked spines, as well as protective hairs surrounding them; it is bicarpellate, with two mericarps. Its endosperm grows before the embryo. The dried umbels can detach from the plant, and have been suggested to have tumbleweed characteristics. The function of the tiny red flower, due to anthocyanin, is to attract insects. The flowers are mainly produced from June to August, rarely also in May or September.

=== Identification ===
D. carota is similar in appearance to the deadly poison hemlock, but is readily distinguished by a mix of tripinnate leaves, fine hairs on its solid green stems and its leaves, a root that smells like carrots, and often a single red flower in the centre of the umbel. Hemlock also differs in having purple mottling on its stems, which also lack the hairiness of the plain green wild carrot stems. Even more distinctive is the unpleasant smell of the crushed leaves of hemlock which is like mouse urine.

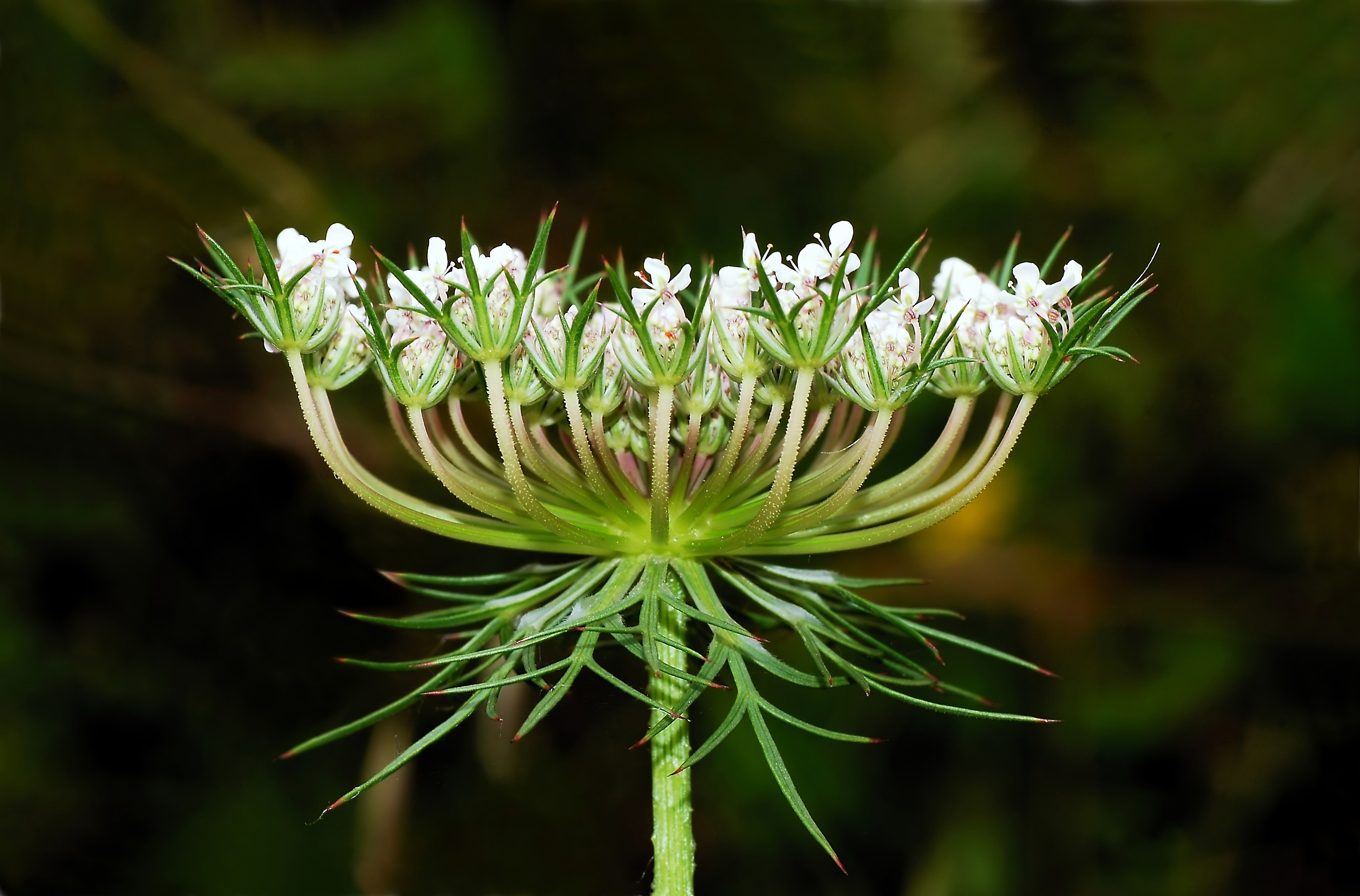
The umbel of a wild carrot

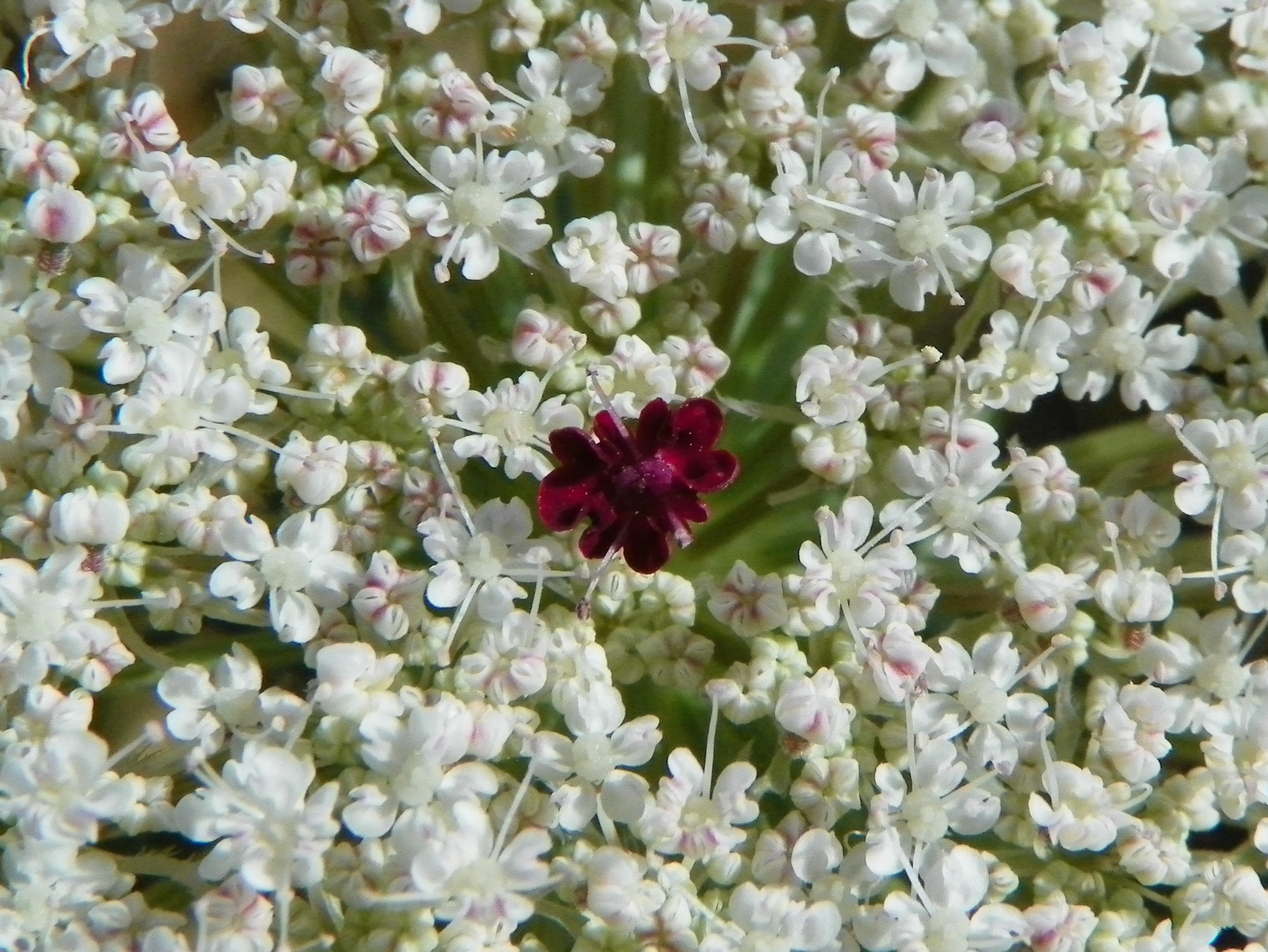
Many umbels have a pink, red, or purple floret in the centre.

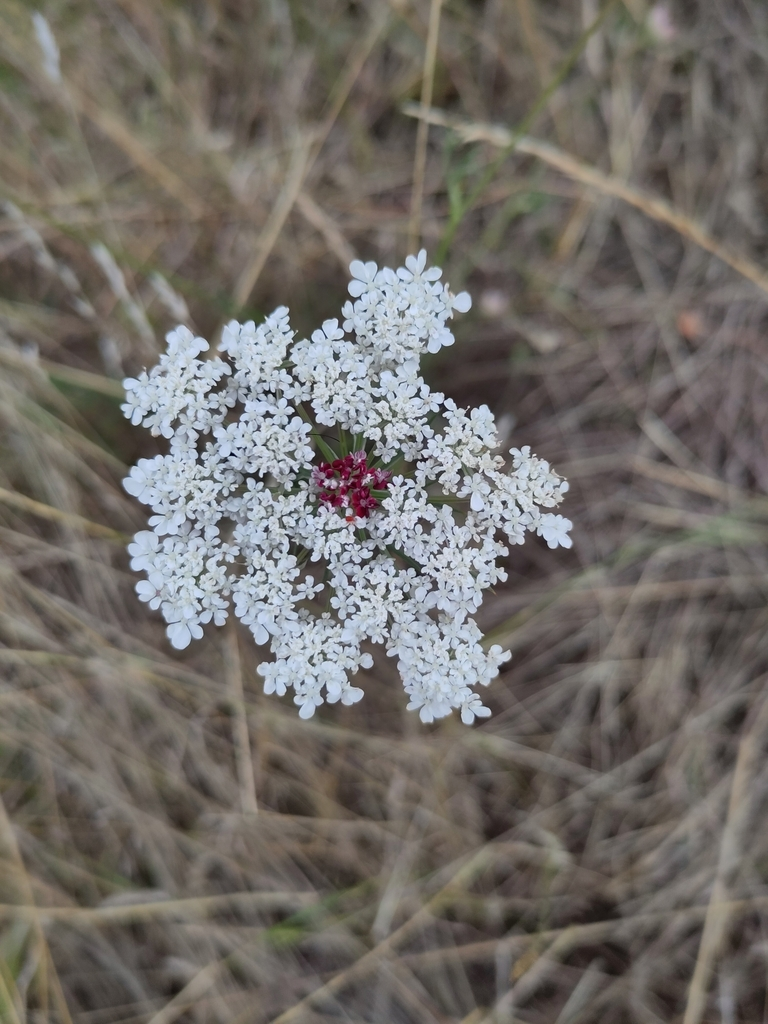
Rarely, there may be more than one red central flower

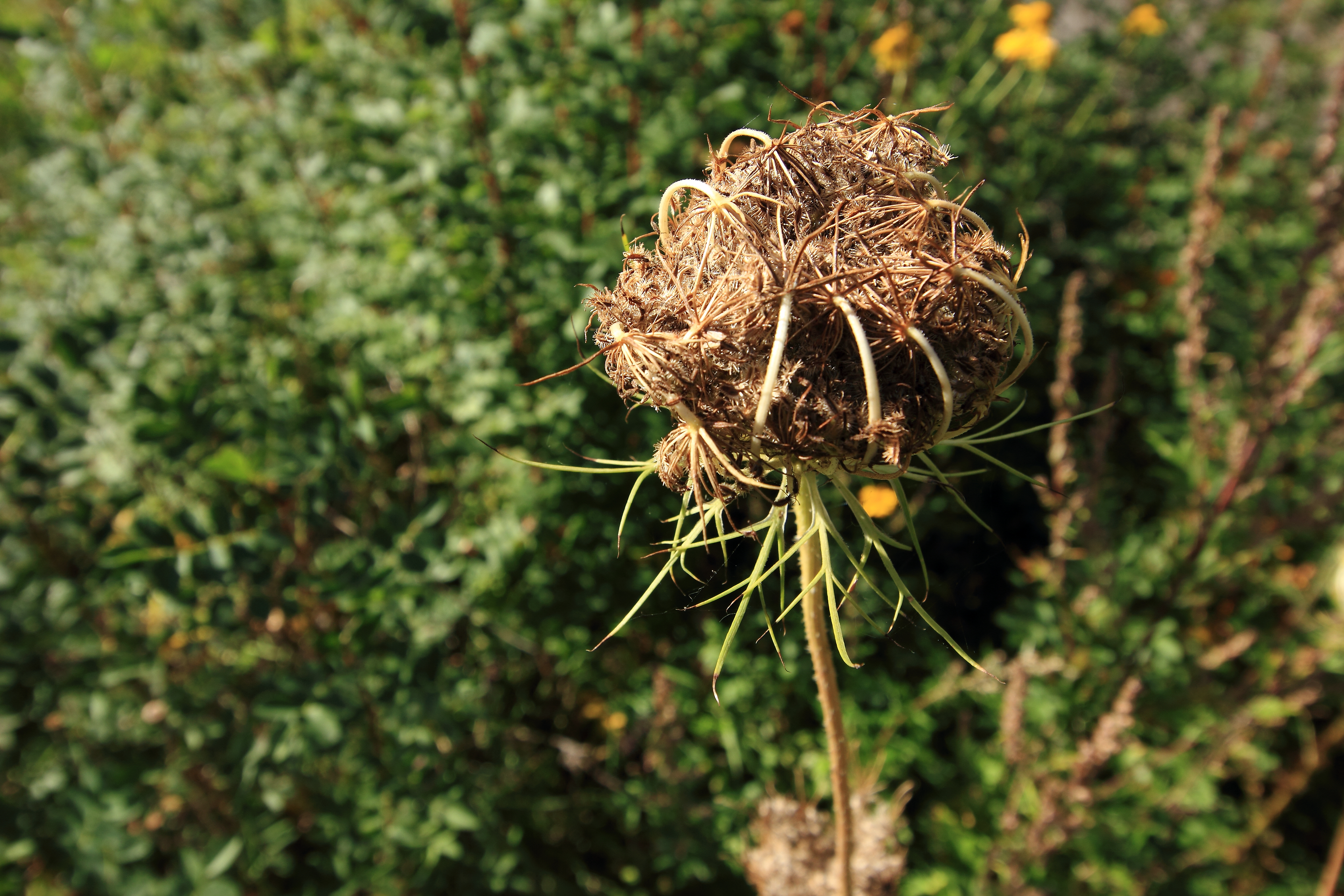
Fruit cluster containing oval fruit with hooked spines

=== Function of the dark central floret ===
The function of the central dark floret of D. carota has been subject to debate since Charles Darwin speculated that it is vestigial. Some have suggested that it has the adaptive function of mimicking insects, thus either discouraging herbivory or attracting pollinators by indicating the presence of food or opportunities for mating. One study in Portugal found that the dark florets contributed to visitation by the varied carpet beetle Anthrenus verbasci, and that higher numbers of dark florets correlated with increased visitation, whereas inflorescences without dark florets had fewer visits. Replacing the dark florets with one or more freeze-killed A. verbasci, which are similar to the florets in size and shape, produced similar results to observations of inflorescences with intact florets.

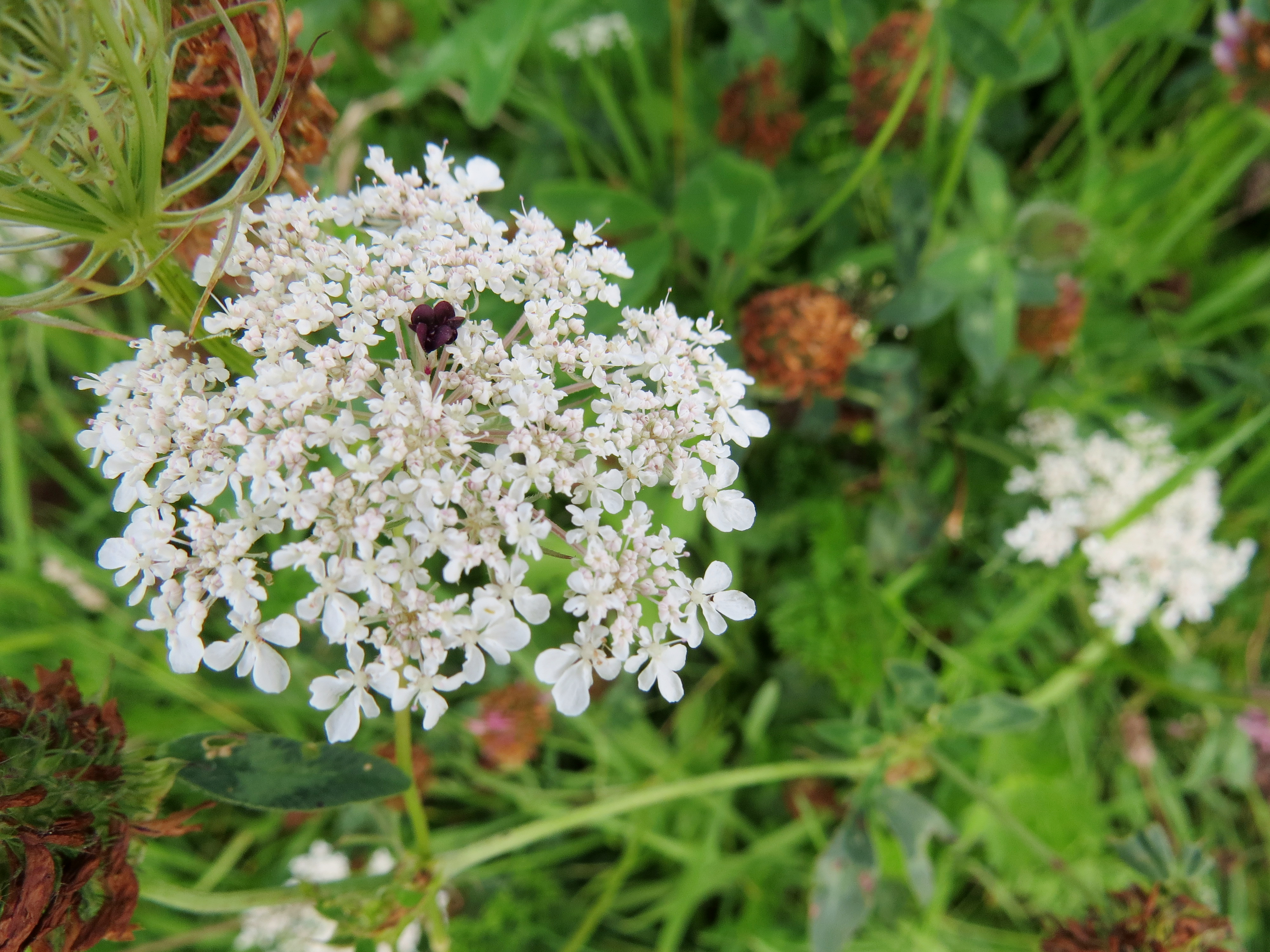
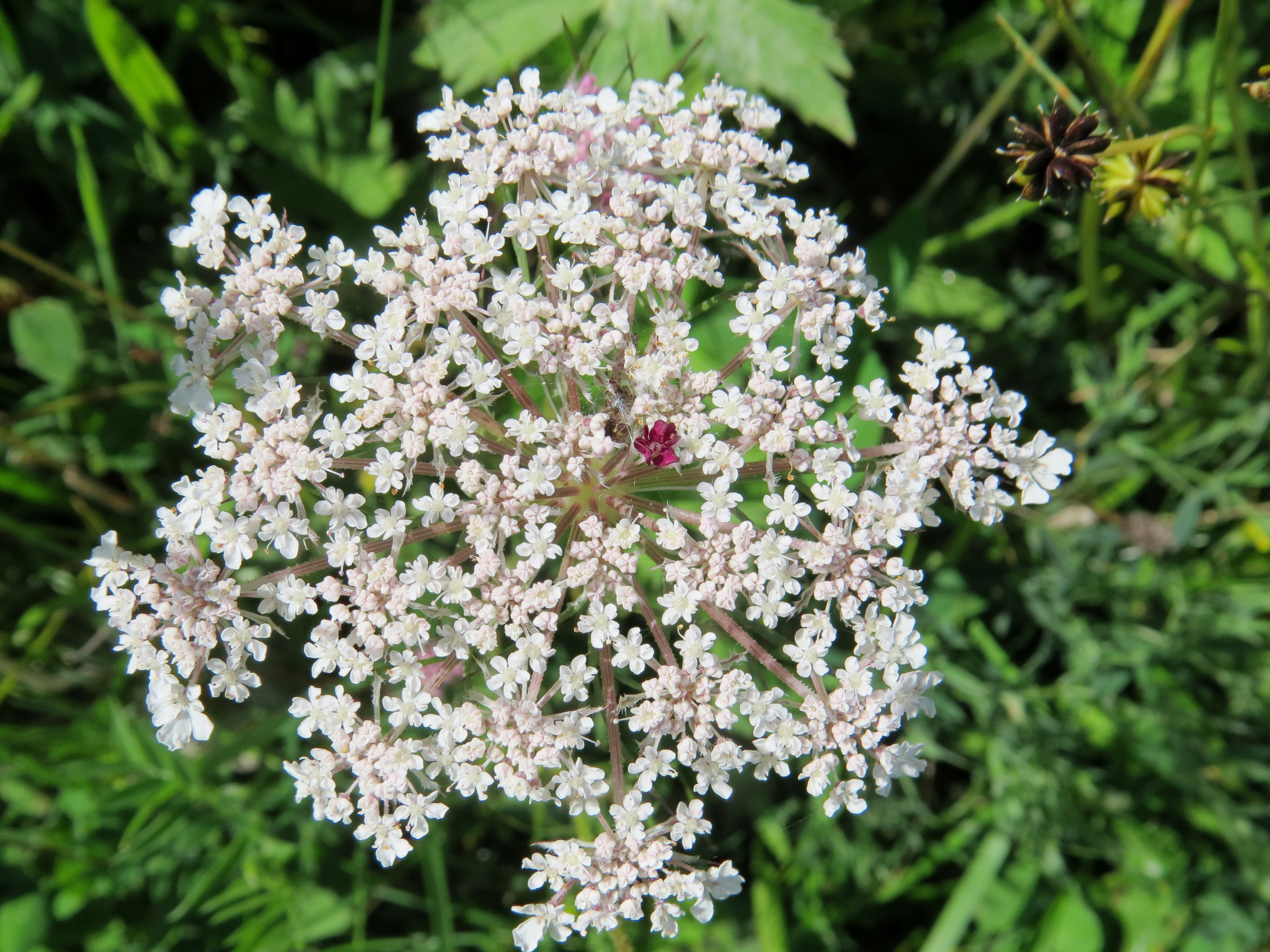
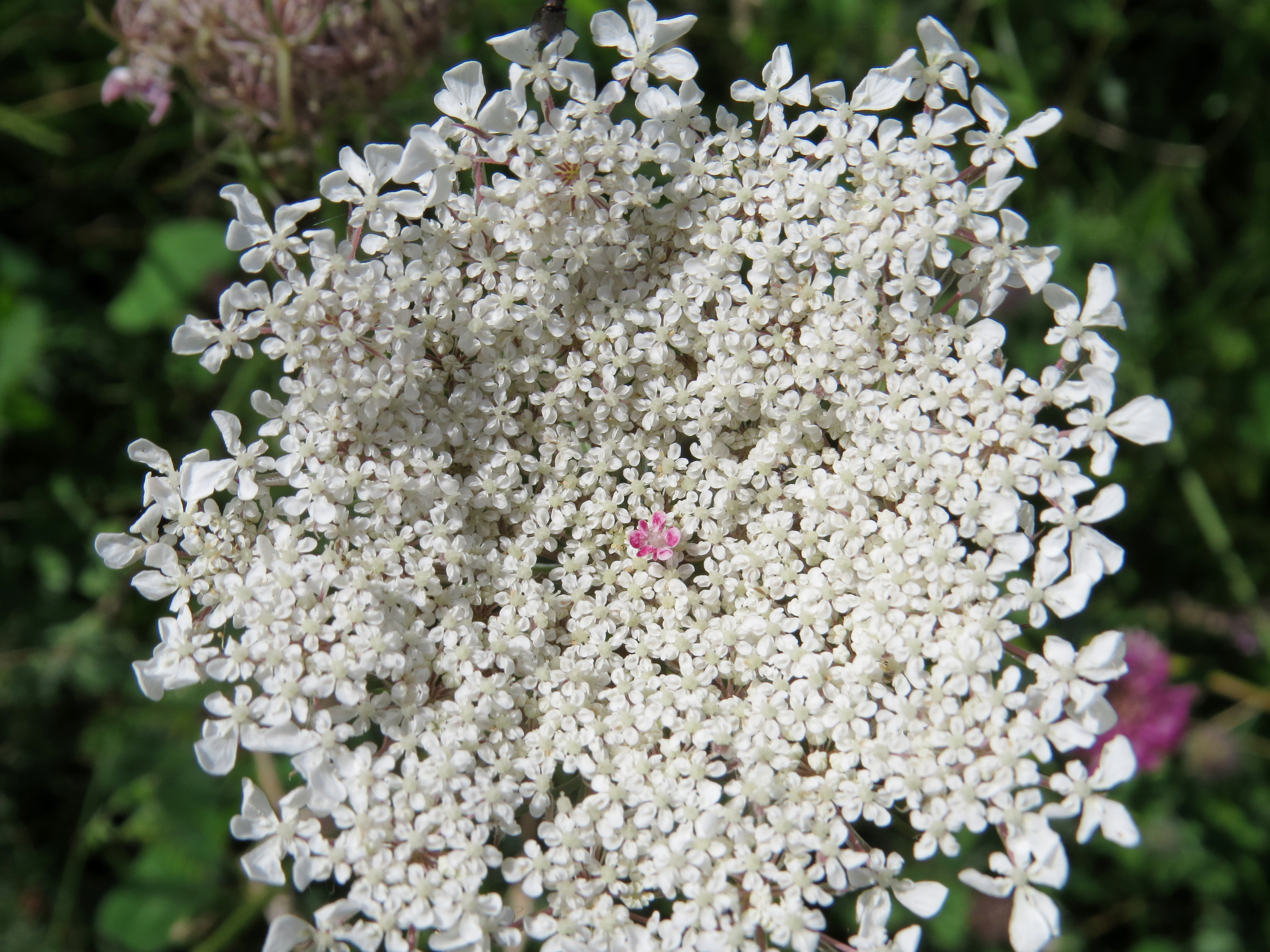
The central floret is variable in intensity of colour; three plants all at the same site, with dark purple, red, and pink, florets respectively

== Taxonomy ==
The carrot was first officially described by Carl Linnaeus in his 1753 work Species Plantarum. In 2016, an international team sequenced the full genome of Daucus carota.

=== Subspecies ===
The cultivated carrot derives from the wild carrot; both are the same species Daucus carota L.

D. carota subsp. carota is the type subspecies, native across temperate areas of the Old World and since naturalised in most temperate regions. Many subspecies of D. carota have evolved in different climates. The type subspecies and all wild subspecies have consistently white roots, with a thin taproot with a bitter taste and woody centre. The middle umbellet of D. carota subsp. carota is not well developed (unlike in D. carota subsp. sativus) and the centre flower varies from red to deep purple.

The cultivated carrot (the domesticated subspecies D. carota subsp. sativus) has been found to be most closely related to Central Asian examples of the type subspecies, indicating a single domestication event and supporting the historical record of its origin there.

D. carota subsp. sativus has roots that can be a wide range of colours, with a thicker root and sweeter taste. The whorl of barbs above the spine on the vallecular ridges of the mericarp of D. carota subsp. sativus mature very well, and the middle umbellet is well developed.

=== List of subspecies ===
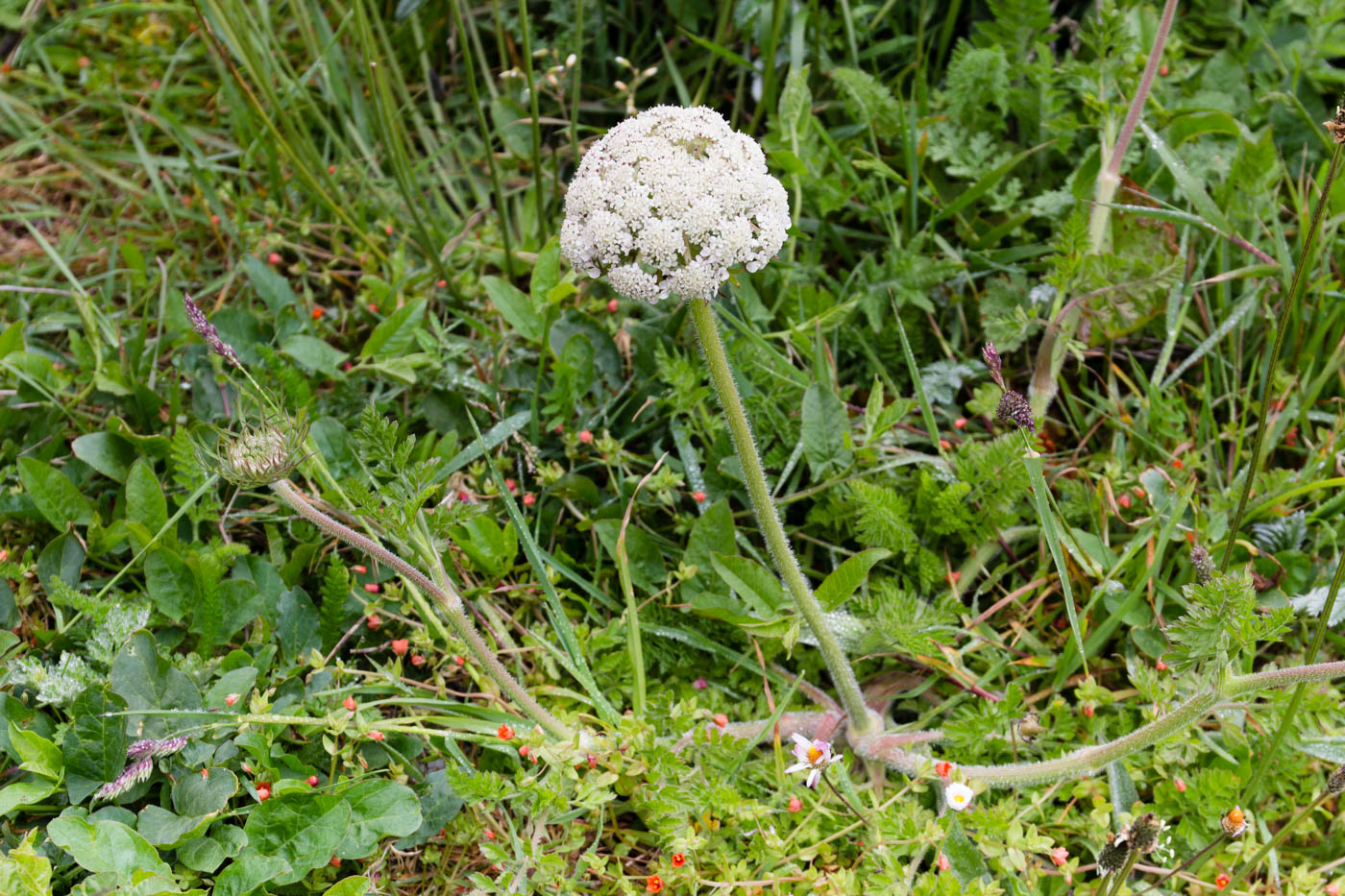
Daucus carota subsp. gummifer on the Irish coast

The following subtaxa are accepted:

- Daucus carota var. abyssinicus A.Braun — Eritrea and Ethiopia
- Daucus carota subsp. annuus (Bég.) Mart.Flores, D.M.Spooner & M.B.Crespo — Cape Verde
- Daucus carota subsp. azoricus Franco — Azores
- Daucus carota subsp. cantabricus A.Pujadas — Spain
- Daucus carota subsp. capillifolius (Gilli) Arbizu — northern Libya
- Daucus carota subsp. caporientalis Reduron — Corsica
- Daucus carota subsp. carota — wild carrot; widespread
- Daucus carota subsp. commutatus (Paol.) Thell. — Portugal & western Mediterranean area
- Daucus carota subsp. corsoccidentalis Reduron — Corsica
- Daucus carota subsp. drepanensis (Arcang.) Heywood — western & central Mediterranean area
- Daucus carota subsp. fontanesii Thell. — western Mediterranean area
- Daucus carota subsp. gadecaei (Rouy & E.G.Camus) Heywood — northwestern France
- Daucus carota subsp. gummifer (Syme) Hook.f. — sea carrot; Britain and Denmark south to Portugal and Spain. Restricted to coastal sites; shorter, but stouter, and densely hairy, stems, fleshy leaves, and often larger, denser, more globose flowerheads.
- Daucus carota subsp. halophilus (Brot.) A.Pujadas — central and southern Portugal
- Daucus carota subsp. hispanicus (Gouan) Thell. — western & central Mediterranean area
- Daucus carota subsp. major (Vis.) Arcang. — southern Europe, Turkey
- Daucus carota subsp. majoricus A.Pujadas — Balearic Islands
- Daucus carota subsp. maritimus (Lam.) Batt. — Macaronesia, Mediterranean
- Daucus carota subsp. maximus (Desf.) Ball — Canary Islands, Mediterranean east to Pakistan
- Daucus carota var. meriensis Reduron — Corsica
- Daucus carota subsp. otaportensis Reduron — Corsica
- Daucus carota subsp. rupestris (Guss.) Heywood — Malta, Sicily
- Daucus carota subsp. sativus (Hoffm.) Schübl. & G.Martens — cultivated carrot; originated in Turkey, cultivated globally
- Daucus carota subsp. tenuissimus (A.Chev.) Mart.Flores, D.M.Spooner & M.B.Crespo — Cape Verde (Santo Antão, Fogo)
- Daucus carota subsp. valeriae Reduron — Corsica

== Distribution and habitat ==
Daucus carota is native to temperate regions of Europe, northern Africa (south to Ethiopia), southwestern and eastern Asia; it has also been introduced to and become naturalised in North and South America, Australia, New Zealand, and South Africa. It is commonly found in meadows, along roadsides and in unused fields. It thrives best in sun to partial shade.

== Toxicity ==
Like many other species of Apiaceae, the leaves of the wild carrot may cause phytophotodermatitis; skin contact with the foliage, especially wet foliage, can cause skin irritation in some people, so caution should be used when handling the plant. It may also have a mild effect on horses.

The compound falcarinol is naturally found in Daucus carota for protection against fungal diseases. Laboratory tests show the compound is toxic to mice and to the water flea Daphnia magna. Normal consumption of carrots has no toxic effect in humans.

== Uses ==
Like the cultivated carrot, the wild carrot root is edible while young, but quickly becomes too woody to consume. The flowers are sometimes battered and fried. The leaves and seeds are also edible.

The seeds and flowers have been used as a method of contraception and an abortifacient for centuries, but scientific research has not confirmed any such effects and there is no evidence of safety. If used as a dyestuff, the flowers give a creamy, off-white colour.

=== Association with other plants ===
This species can be used as a companion plant to crops. Like most members of the umbellifer family, it attracts wasps to its small flowers in its native land, but where it has been introduced, it attracts very few wasps. In northeast Wisconsin, it did succeed in attracting butterflies and wasps when introduced with blueberries. In western Washington grazed grasslands dominated by Carex inops, it was the most frequently-visited flower by the ochre ringlet butterfly Coenonympha california. This species is also documented to boost tomato plant production when kept nearby, and it can provide a microclimate of cooler, moister air for lettuce, when intercropped with it. But Iowa, Michigan, and Washington have listed it as a noxious weed, and it is considered a serious pest in pastures. It persists in the soil seed bank for two to five years.

=== Taste ===
Several different factors can cause the root of a carrot to have abnormal metabolites (notably 6-methoxymellin) that can cause a bitter taste in the roots. For example, carrots have a more bitter taste when grown in the presence of apples. Also, ethylene can easily produce stress, causing a bitter taste.

== Culture ==
Wild carrot was introduced into North America by European settlers and has become common; it is often known as "Queen Anne's lace" there. Anne, Queen of Great Britain is the queen after whom the plant is reputedly named, though as a plant name it is not known before 1895, 180 years after her death. It is so called because the inflorescence resembles lace, prominent in fine clothing of the day; the red flower in the centre is said to represent a droplet of blood where Queen Anne pricked herself with a needle when she was making the lace.

=== History through artwork ===
The history of Daucus carota and its cultivation in different parts of the world can be traced through historical texts and artwork. Paintings from the 16th and 17th centuries, for example, of maids in a market or farmers' most recent crops can provide information on carrots' history. Such paintings show that yellow or red roots were cultivated in Turkey, North Africa, and Spain. Orange roots were cultivated in 17th-century Netherlands.

=== References in poetry ===
"Queen Anne's Lace" is the title and subject of a poem by William Carlos Williams in his 1921 collection Sour Grapes.

== See also ==
- Daucus pusillus, American wild carrot
