= Polypetalae =

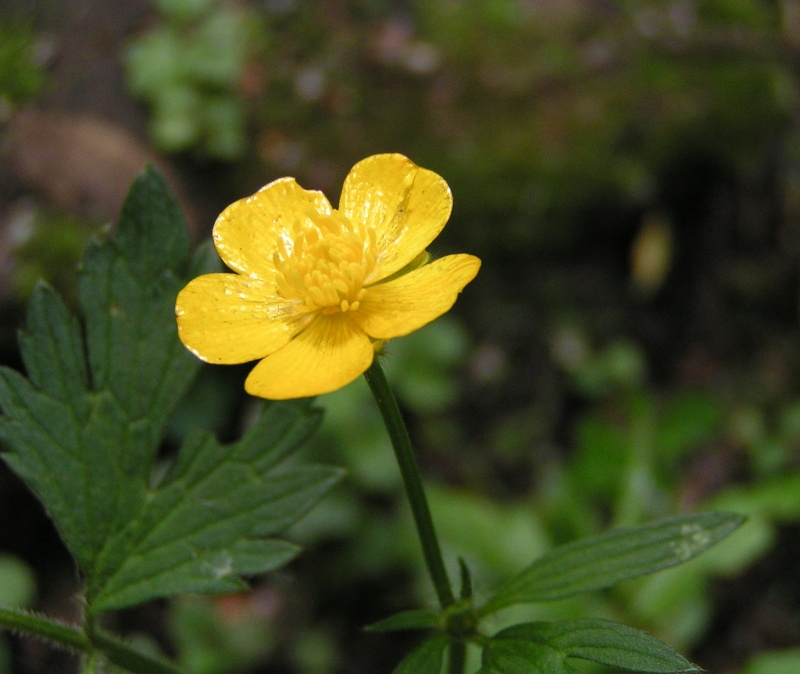
Polypetalae includes buttercups, Ranunculus

Polypetalae was a taxonomic grouping used in the identification of plants, but it is now considered to be an artificial group, one that does not reflect evolutionary history. The grouping was based on similar morphological plant characteristics. Polypetalae was defined as including plants with the petals free from the base or only slightly connected. Members of Polypetalae contain bitegmic ovules (i.e., ovules having two integuments).

== See also ==
- Plant identification
- Calyciflorae
