= Justicia oncodes =

Scientific classification
- Kingdom: Plantae
- Clade: Tracheophytes
- Clade: Angiosperms
- Clade: Eudicots
- Clade: Asterids
- Order: Lamiales
- Family: Acanthaceae
- Genus: Justicia
- Species: J. oncodes

Binomial name
- Justicia oncodes (Lindau) Wassh. & C.Ezcurra (1997)

Synonyms
- Poikilacanthus oncodes Lindau (1898)

Species of flowering plant

Justicia oncodes is a species of flowering plant endemic to central and eastern Brazil, where it is native to the Cerrado ecoregion.
