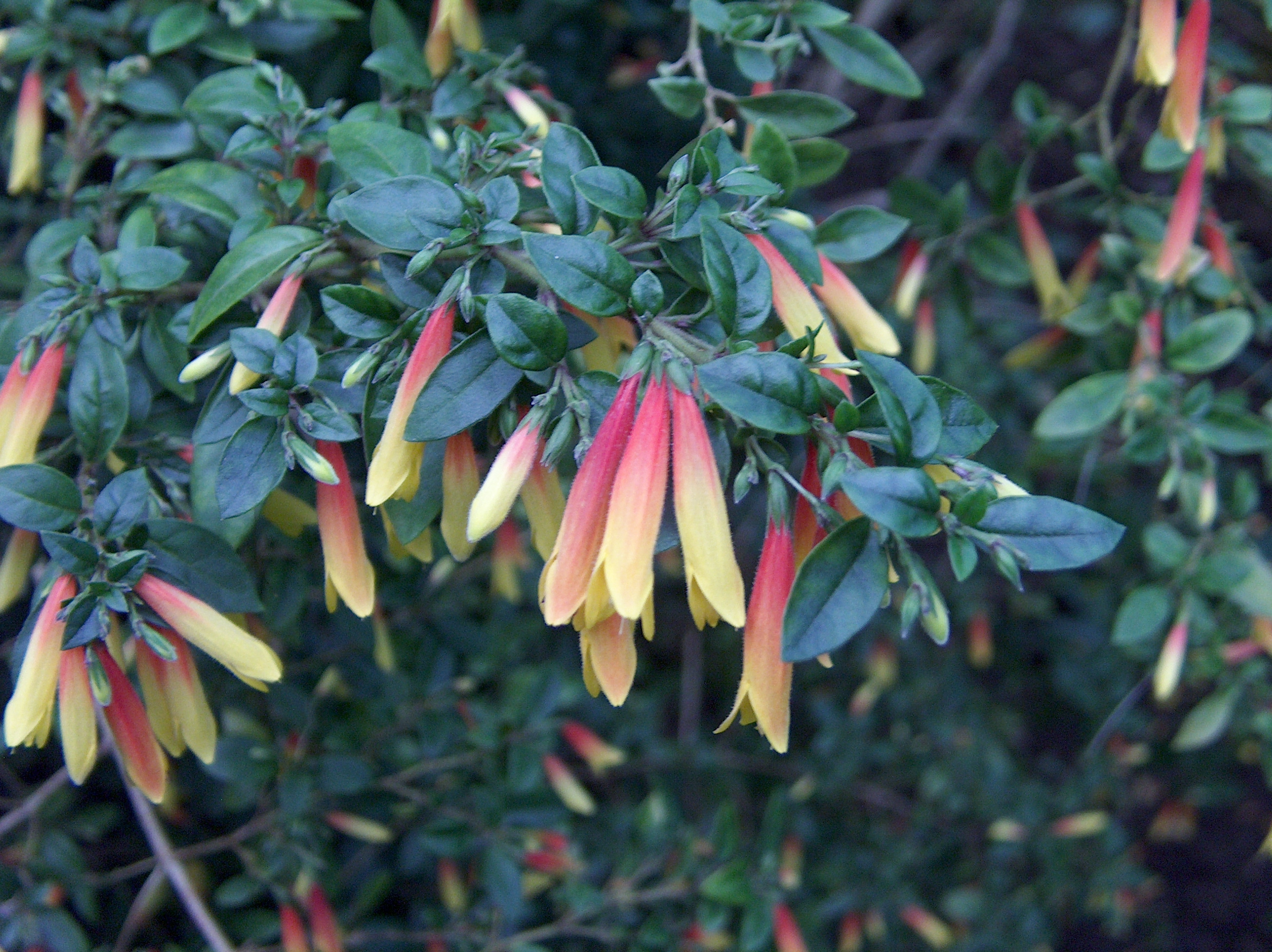

Scientific classification
- Kingdom: Plantae
- Clade: Tracheophytes
- Clade: Angiosperms
- Clade: Eudicots
- Clade: Asterids
- Order: Lamiales
- Family: Acanthaceae
- Genus: Justicia
- Species: J. floribunda

Binomial name
- Justicia floribunda (K.Koch) Wassh. (1998)

Synonyms
- Libonia floribunda K.Koch; Jacobinia pauciflora (Nees) Lindau; Justicia rizzinii Wassh.

= Justicia floribunda =

Species of shrub

Justicia floribunda is a species of flowering plant in the acanthus family Acanthaceae, native to southern Brazil, Paraguay, and Misiones Province of northeastern Argentina.

It is a dwarf, rounded evergreen shrub growing to 30–60 cm (12–24 in) tall and wide, with downy stems and leaves, and spikes of nodding, tubular flowers of yellow shading to scarlet at the base. Each pair of leaves has one leaf smaller than the other. It requires a frost-free environment, so is often grown under glass in temperate regions. Despite its common name Brazilian fuchsia, it is not closely related to the true fuchsias.

This plant has gained the Royal Horticultural Society's Award of Garden Merit.
