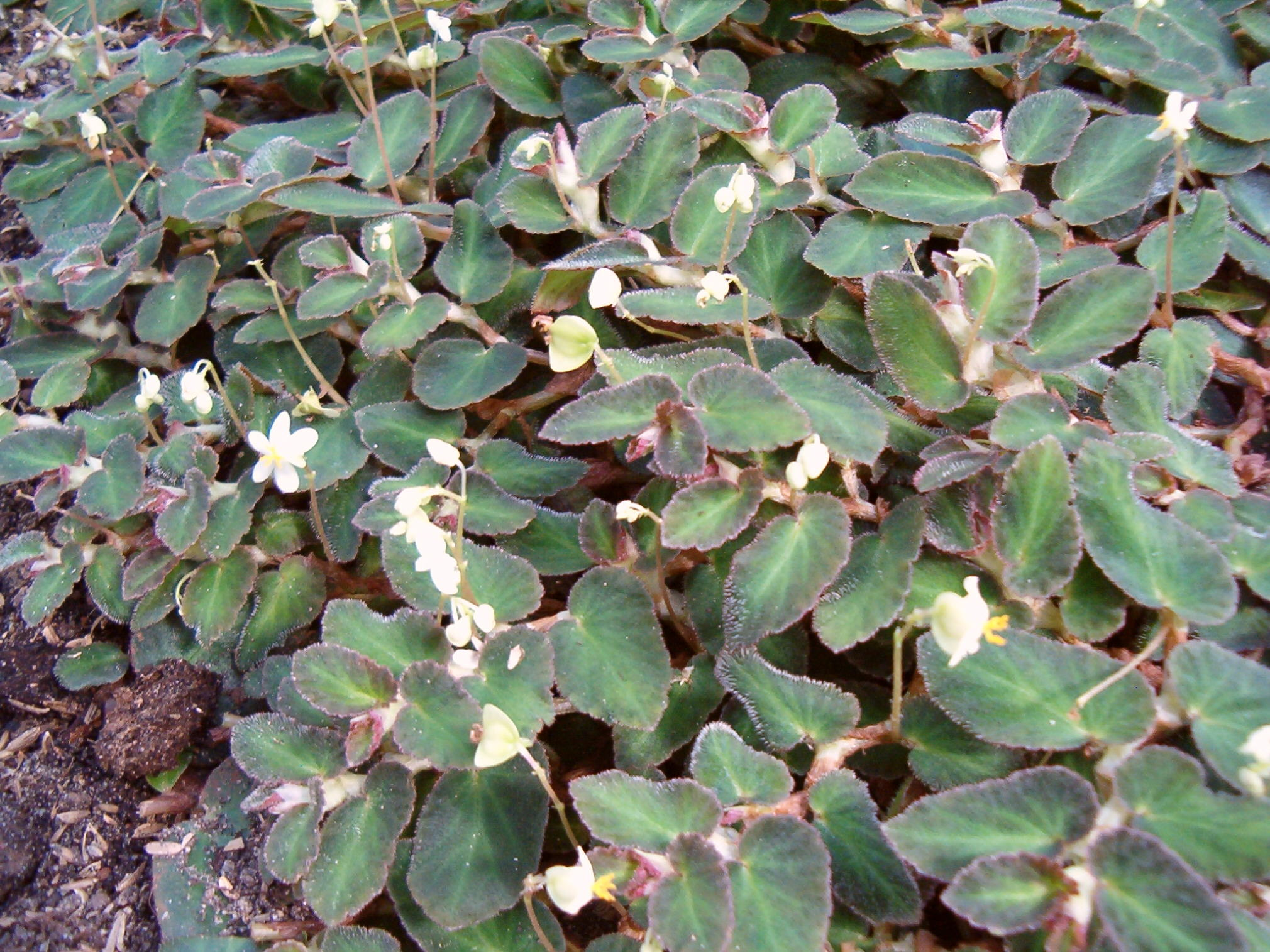
- Habit
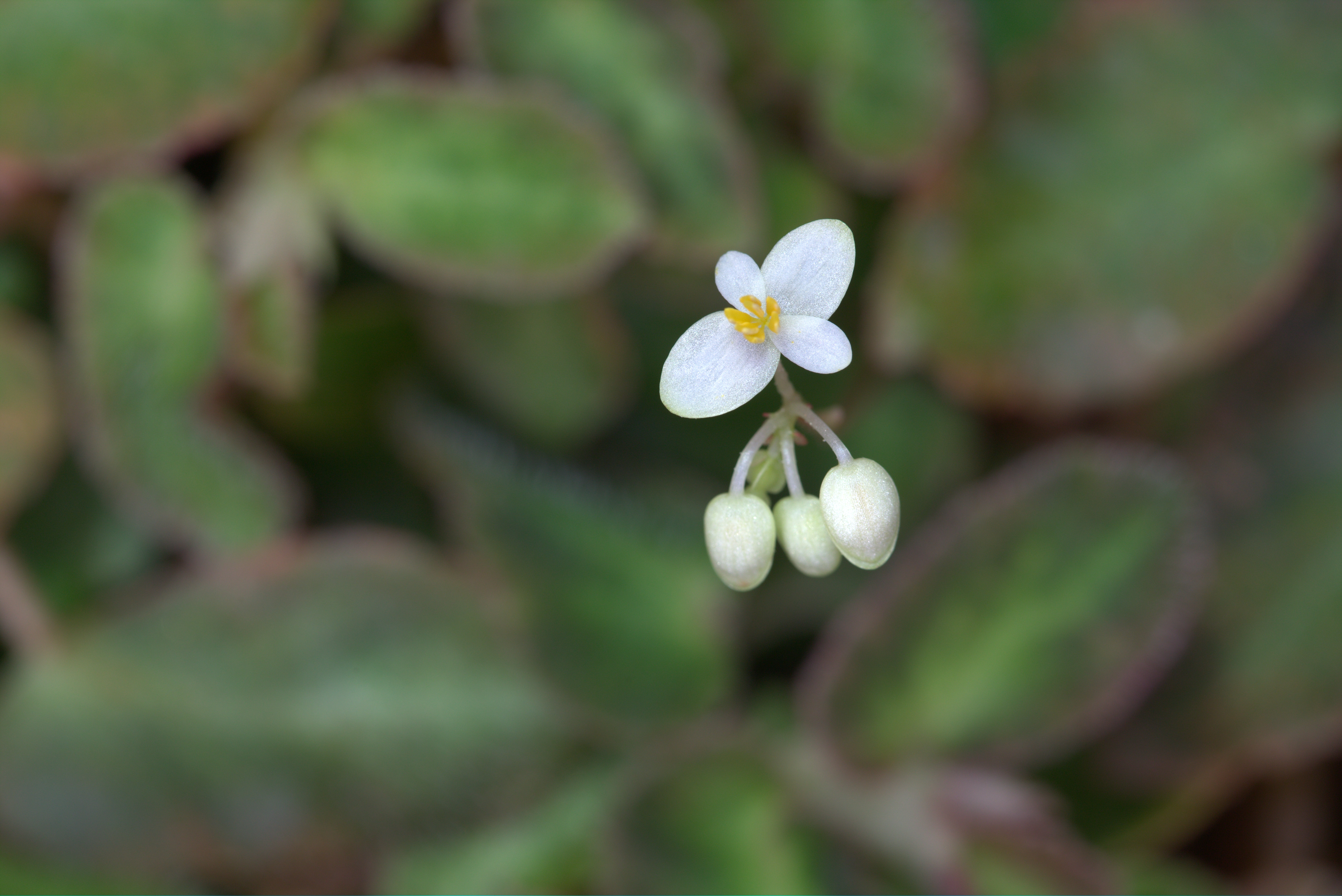
- Close-up of flower

Scientific classification
- Kingdom: Plantae
- Clade: Tracheophytes
- Clade: Angiosperms
- Clade: Eudicots
- Clade: Rosids
- Order: Cucurbitales
- Family: Begoniaceae
- Genus: Begonia
- Species: B. thelmae

Binomial name
- Begonia thelmae L.B.Sm. & Wassh.

= Begonia thelmae =

Species of flowering plant

Begonia thelmae is a species of flowering plant in the family Begoniaceae. It is native to Espírito Santo, Brazil, where it grows epiphytically on tree trunks. A creeping perennial with a trailing-scandent growth habit, its bronze-accented leaves are elliptic and highly asymmetric. It can climb vertically, or grow horizontally as ground-cover. It is considered a good plant for terrariums.
