= Nuriana =

Nuriana may refer to:

- Justicia nuriana, a species of flowering plant from Venezuela
- Nana Nuriana (1938 – 2024), an Indonesian military officer
