= J. californica =

J. californica may refer to:

- Juglans californica, the California black walnut, California walnut or the Southern California black walnut, a large shrub or small tree species endemic to California
- Juniperus californica, the California juniper, a tree species mainly found in California
- Justicia californica, the chuparosa, hummingbird bush or beloperone, a flowering shrub species native to the deserts of southern California, Arizona and northern Mexico

== See also ==
- List of Latin and Greek words commonly used in systematic names § C
