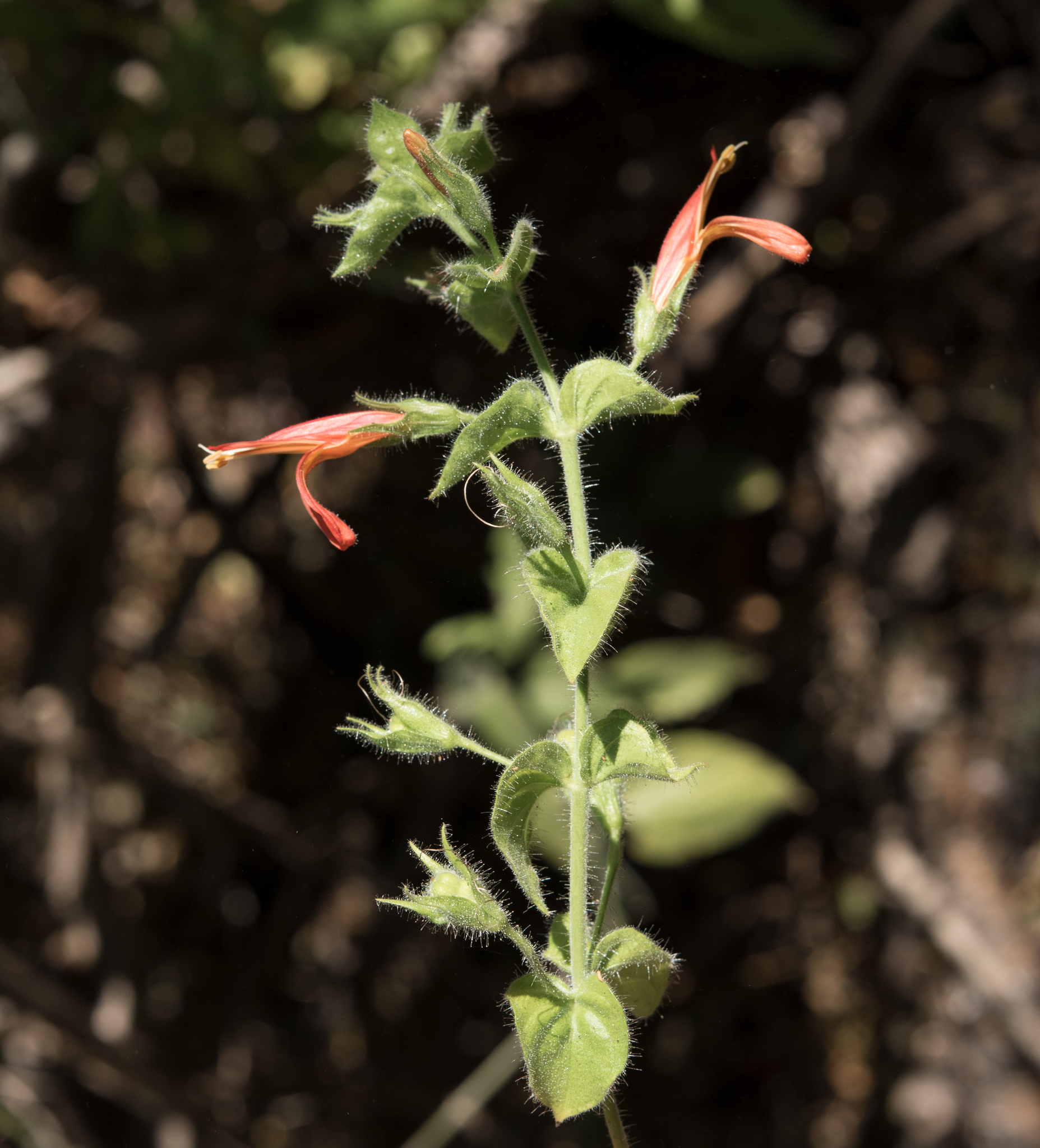

Scientific classification
- Kingdom: Plantae
- Clade: Tracheophytes
- Clade: Angiosperms
- Clade: Eudicots
- Clade: Asterids
- Order: Lamiales
- Family: Acanthaceae
- Genus: Justicia
- Species: J. purpusii

Binomial name
- Justicia purpusii (Brandegee) D.N.Gibson

Synonyms
- Beloperone purpusii Brandegee (1903)

= Justicia purpusii =

Purpus' hummingbird flower

Species of plant

Justicia purpusii is a species of flowering plant in the Acanthus family commonly known as Purpus' hummingbird flower or chuparosa. This shrub is characterized by long orange-red tubular flowers that bloom from November to April. It is endemic to the Cape region of Baja California Sur, Mexico, where it is found growing in tropical deciduous forest and thorn scrub in canyons and along wet slopes. It is similar to its more northern relative adapted to drier climates, Justicia californica. Phylogenetic analysis has shown that both species are closely related and form a clade.

== Description ==
This species is a shrub covered in tomentose and villous hairs throughout. The foliage consists of opposite ovate to elliptic leaves with mostly entire margins. The lower leaves measure 7–8 cm (2.8–3.1 in) long by 4–5 cm (1.6–2.0 in) wide, and are connected to the stem by petioles 2 cm (0.79 in) long. The upper leaves gradually have shorter petioles until they become sessile cordate to broadly ovate bracts. These bracts are broader than they are long and have a clasping base.

Emerging from the axils of the bracts are the flowers. The calyx is divided into five narrow segments 12–18 mm (0.47–0.71 in) long. The corolla is 3 cm (1.2 in) long, with an erect upper lip and a 3-lobed lower lip. The seeds are ash-colored, nearly spherical, and rugose on the sides.

This species can be distinguished from its close relative Justicia californica by the flowers that emerge from larger, persistent bracts and its non-tropical distribution. J. californica meanwhile is restricted to more arid, desert climates and has small, insignificant bracts and shorter calyx lobes.

== Distribution and habitat ==
This species is endemic to the Cape region of Baja California Sur, Mexico, the southernmost part of the Baja California peninsula. It is found in the tropical dry forests and thorn scrub of the area, and is typically seen growing in the shady canyons and their rocky beds and on wet slopes, steep walls, hillsides, and ridges from 250–1,000 m (820–3,280 ft) in elevation.
