= Justicia ianthina =

Conservation status
- Near Threatened (IUCN 3.1)

Scientific classification
- Kingdom: Plantae
- Clade: Tracheophytes
- Clade: Angiosperms
- Clade: Eudicots
- Clade: Asterids
- Order: Lamiales
- Family: Acanthaceae
- Genus: Justicia
- Species: J. ianthina

Binomial name
- Justicia ianthina Wassh. (1977)

Species of flowering plant

Justicia ianthina is a species of plant in the family Acanthaceae. It is native to Ecuador and Peru. Its natural habitat is subtropical or tropical moist lowland forests from sea level up to 500 meters elevation. It is threatened by habitat loss.
