= Justicia austroguangxiensis =

Scientific classification
- Kingdom: Plantae
- Clade: Embryophytes
- Clade: Tracheophytes
- Clade: Angiosperms
- Clade: Eudicots
- Clade: Asterids
- Order: Lamiales
- Family: Acanthaceae
- Genus: Justicia
- Species: J. austroguangxiensis

Binomial name
- Justicia austroguangxiensis H.S.Lo & D.Fang (1997)

Synonyms
- Justicia austroguangxiensis f. albinervia D.Fang & H.S.Lo (1997); Mananthes austroguangxiensis (H.S.Lo & D.Fang) C.Y.Wu & C.C.Hu (2002); Mananthes austroguangxiensis f. albinervia (D.Fang & H.S.Lo) C.Y.Wu & C.C.Hu (2002)

Species of flowering plant

Justicia austroguangxiensis, synonym Mananthes austroguangxiensis, is a species of flowering plant in the family Acanthaceae. It is a perennial native to Guangxi Province of southern China.
