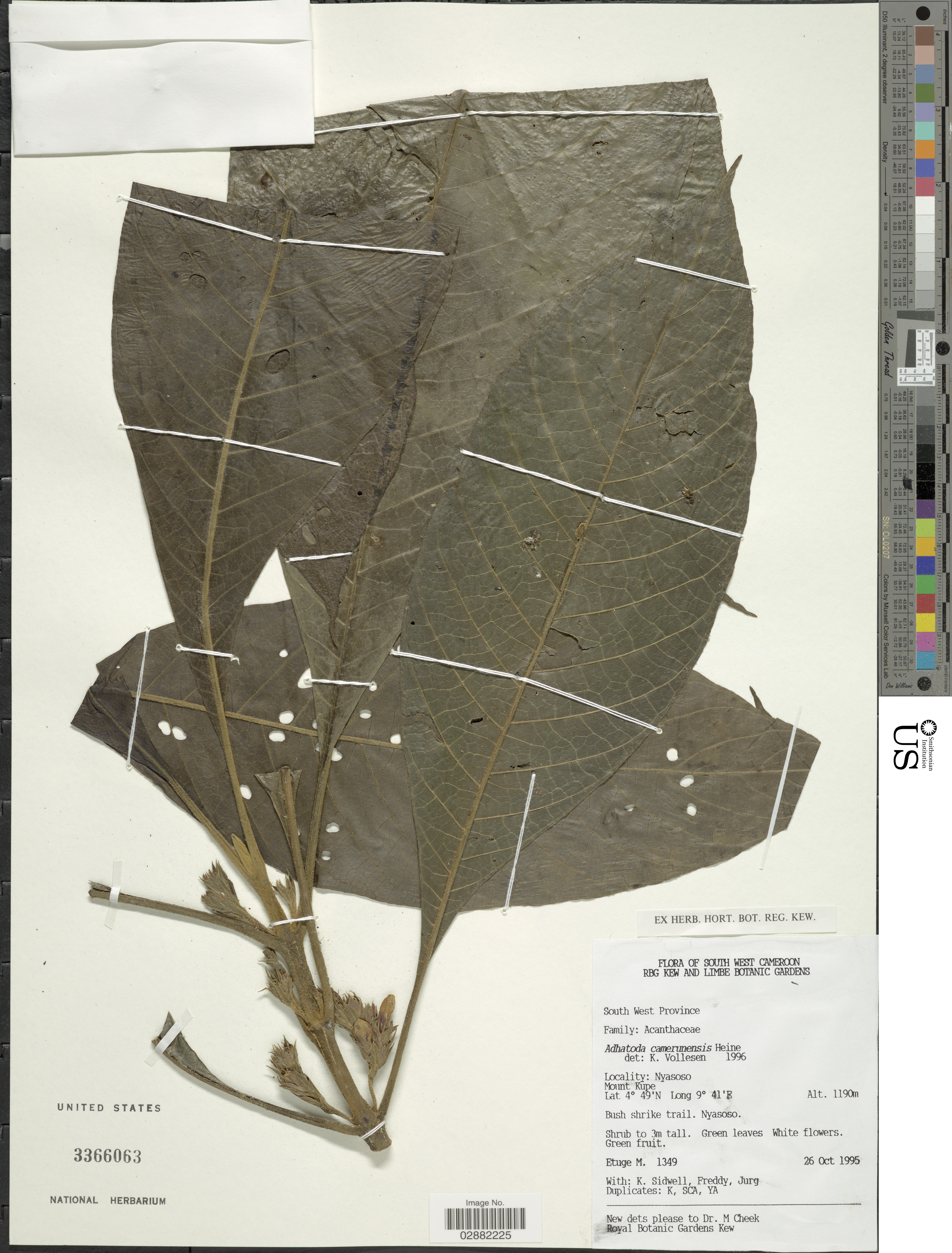

Conservation status
- Vulnerable (IUCN 3.1)

Scientific classification
- Kingdom: Plantae
- Clade: Tracheophytes
- Clade: Angiosperms
- Clade: Eudicots
- Clade: Asterids
- Order: Lamiales
- Family: Acanthaceae
- Genus: Justicia
- Species: J. camerunensis

Binomial name
- Justicia camerunensis (Heine) I.Darbysh. (2004)

Synonyms
- Adhatoda camerunensis Heine (1962)

= Justicia camerunensis =

Species of plant

Justicia camerunensis is a species of flowering plant in the family Acanthaceae. It is found in Cameroon and Nigeria. Its natural habitat is the understorey of closed-canopy mid-elevation tropical lowland and montane rain forests from 600 to 1,400 meters elevation. It is threatened by habitat loss.
