= Justicia nuriana =

Scientific classification
- Kingdom: Plantae
- Clade: Tracheophytes
- Clade: Angiosperms
- Clade: Eudicots
- Clade: Asterids
- Order: Lamiales
- Family: Acanthaceae
- Genus: Justicia
- Species: J. nuriana

Binomial name
- Justicia nuriana Wassh.

Species of flowering plant

Justicia nuriana is a plant species endemic to eastern Venezuela. It is known from the State of Bolívar, Altiplanicie de Nuria.

Justicia nurianais an herb up to 1 m tall. Leaves are broadly oblong to ovate, up to 22 cm long. Flowers are borne in spikes at the end of branches. Capsule is egg-shaped (unusual for the genus), up to 13 mm long.
