= James Justice (horticulturalist) =

Sir James Justice (1698–1763) was a Scottish horticulturalist/gardener. His works on gardening, such as The Scots Gardiner and The British Gardener, were distributed in much of Britain and Ireland. He reportedly had a passion for botanical experiments, which he pursued at the expense of his finances and family. His divorce and expulsion from the Fellowship in the Royal Society has been blamed on the expenses he put into greenhouses and soil mixtures. He is nevertheless a noted figure in Scottish gardening with a claim to be the father of it. He had a son from his second marriage. The genus Justicia is named for him.

== Bibliography ==
- The British gardener's new director : chiefly adapted to the climate of the northern counties: directing the necessary works in the kitchen, fruit and pleasure gardens, and in the nursery, greenhouse, and stove. 5th edition 1771
