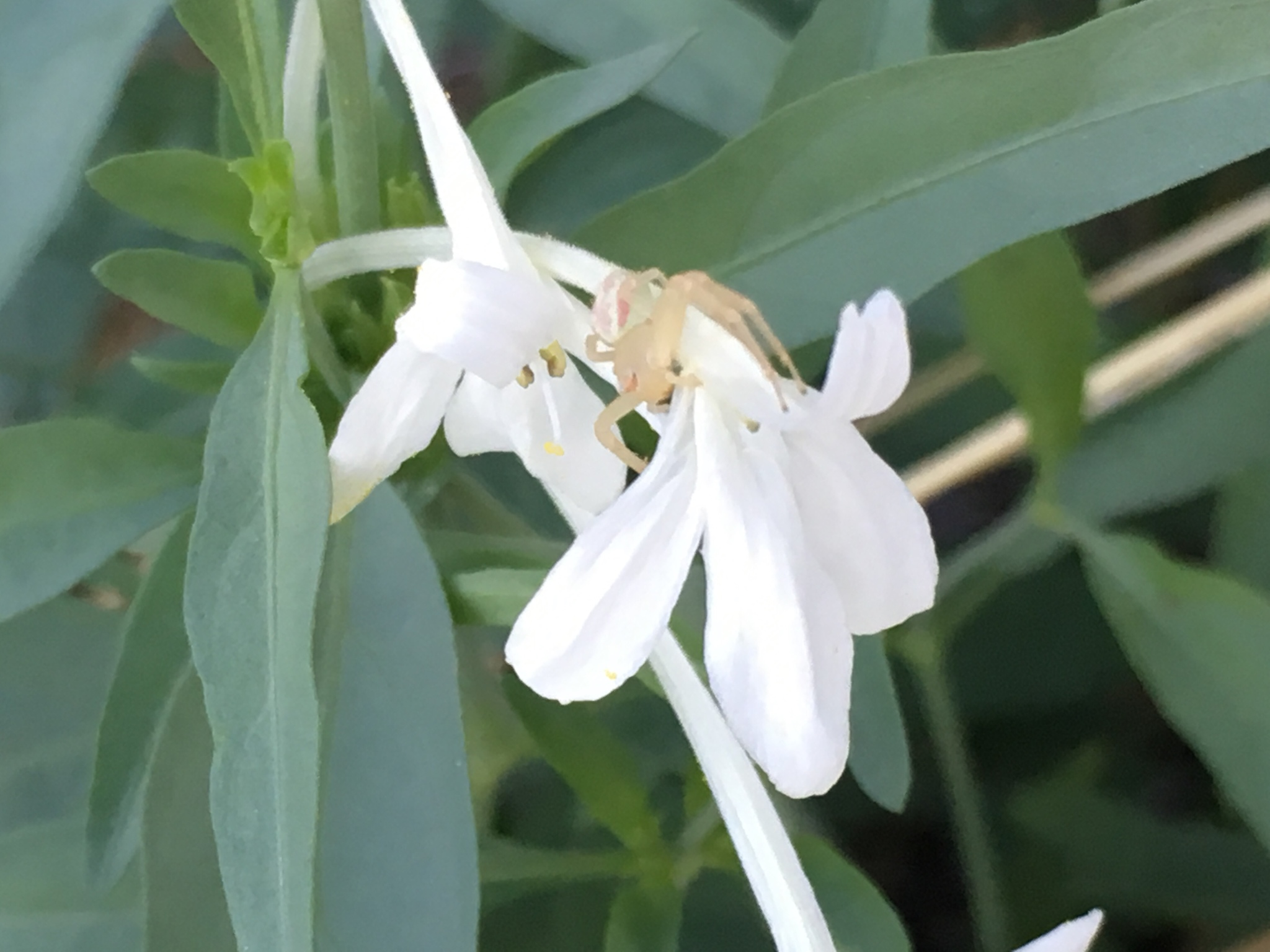

Scientific classification
- Kingdom: Plantae
- Clade: Tracheophytes
- Clade: Angiosperms
- Clade: Eudicots
- Clade: Asterids
- Order: Lamiales
- Family: Acanthaceae
- Genus: Justicia
- Species: J. longii

Binomial name
- Justicia longii Hilsenb.

= Justicia longii =

Species of shrub

Justicia longii, the longflower tube tongue, is an herbaceous perennial subshrub in the family Acanthaceae found in the Arizona Upland of the Sonoran Desert. Each of its white flowers blooms in the evening and lasts only a single night. The next morning the corollas fall, littering the ground with a white carpet. It has a long bloom season from April to October.

This species is also present in the Sierra de La Libertad of the central desert in Baja California and in Sonora, Mexico.
