= Justicia orbicularis =

Conservation status
- Vulnerable (IUCN 3.1)

Scientific classification
- Kingdom: Plantae
- Clade: Tracheophytes
- Clade: Angiosperms
- Clade: Eudicots
- Clade: Asterids
- Order: Lamiales
- Family: Acanthaceae
- Genus: Justicia
- Species: J. orbicularis

Binomial name
- Justicia orbicularis (Lindau) V.A.W.Graham (1988)

Synonyms
- Adhatoda orbicularis (Lindau) C.B.Clarke (1900); Duvernoia orbicularis Lindau (1895); Ecbolium mannii (T.Anderson) Kuntze (1891); Justicia mannii T.Anderson (1863)

Species of flowering plant

Justicia orbicularis is a species of plant in the family Acanthaceae. It is found in Cameroon, southern Nigeria, and on the island of Bioko in Equatorial Guinea. Its natural habitat is tropical moist lowland forests from sea level to 700 meters elevation. It is threatened by habitat loss.
