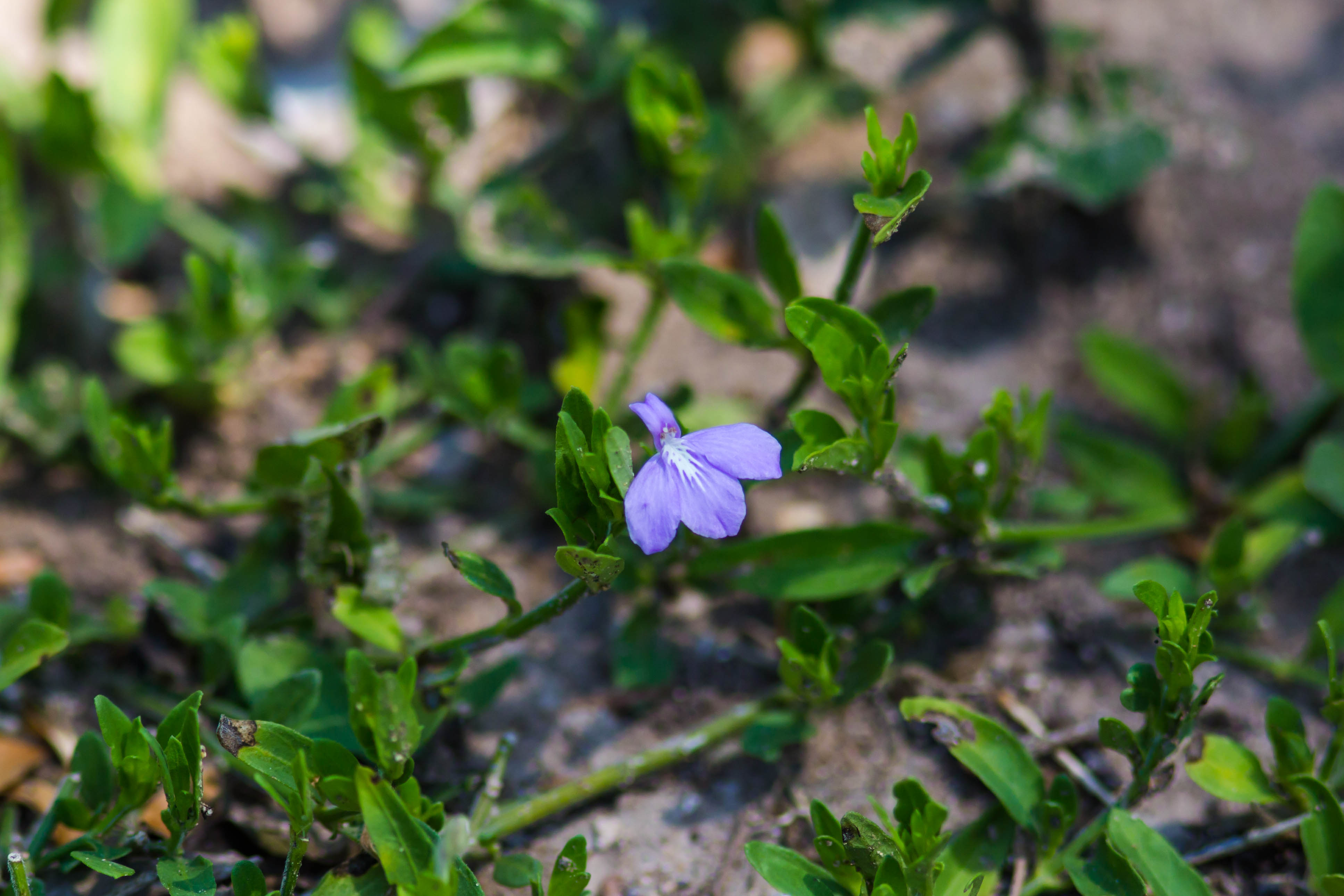
- Flower and foliage
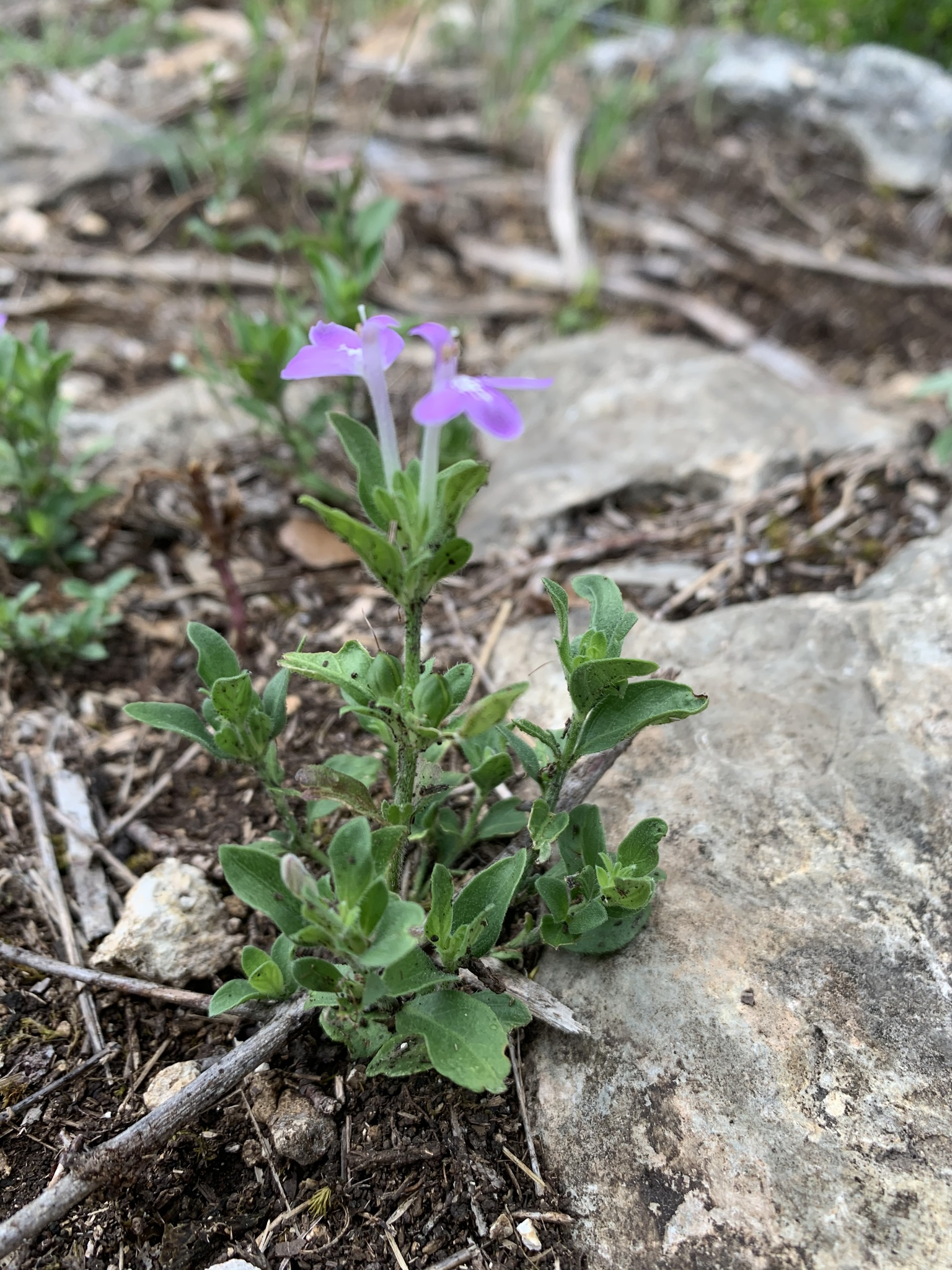
- Habit

Scientific classification
- Kingdom: Plantae
- Clade: Tracheophytes
- Clade: Angiosperms
- Clade: Eudicots
- Clade: Asterids
- Order: Lamiales
- Family: Acanthaceae
- Genus: Justicia
- Species: J. pilosella

Binomial name
- Justicia pilosella (Nees) Hilsenb.

Synonyms
- List: Adhatoda dipteracantha Nees; Dipteracanthus procumbens Nees; Justicia turneri Hilsenb.; Monechma pilosella Nees; Siphonoglossa dipteracantha (Nees) A.Heller; Siphonoglossa greggii Greenm. & C.H.Thomps.; Siphonoglossa pilosella (Nees) Torr.

= Justicia pilosella =

Species of plant

Justicia pilosella (syns. Siphonoglossa pilosella and Monechma pilosella), the hairy tube-tongue, Gregg's tube tongue, or false honeysuckle, is a species of flowering plant in the family Acanthaceae. It is native to New Mexico, Texas, and east-central Mexico. A perennial herb reaching 1 ft (30 cm), it is typically found growing in clearings and forest edges in rocky or gravelly soils.
