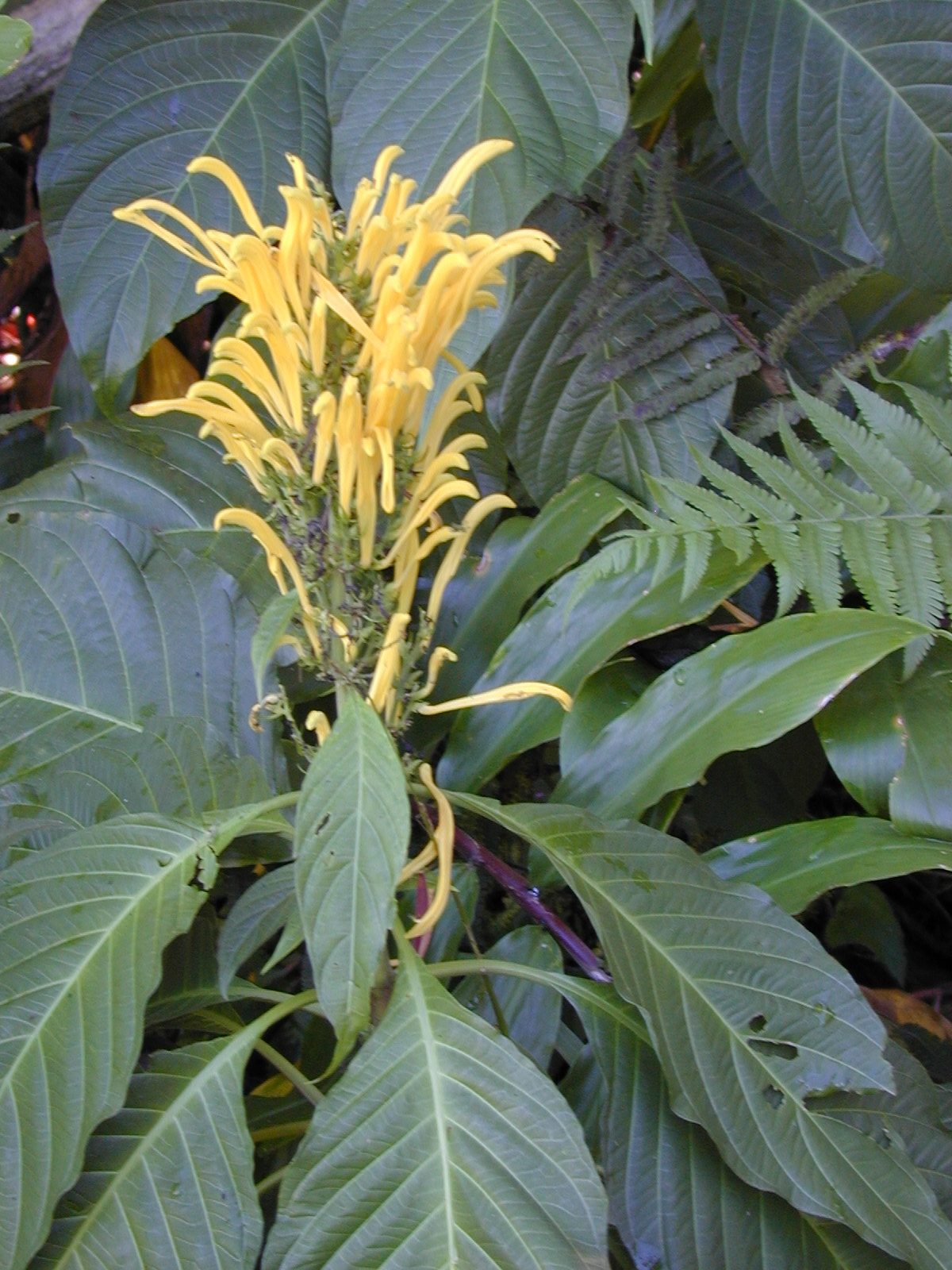

Scientific classification
- Kingdom: Plantae
- Clade: Tracheophytes
- Clade: Angiosperms
- Clade: Eudicots
- Clade: Asterids
- Order: Lamiales
- Family: Acanthaceae
- Genus: Justicia
- Species: J. aurea

Binomial name
- Justicia aurea Schltdl. (1832)

Synonyms
- Adhatoda vellasquezii (Bertol.) Nees (1847); Cyrtanthera aurea var. glaberrima Nees (1847); Cyrtanthera aurea (Schltdl.) Nees (1847); Cyrtanthera catalpifolia Nees (1849); Cyrtanthera umbrosa (Benth.) Nees (1847); Ecbolium vellasquezii (Bertol.) Kuntze (1891); Jacobinia aurea (Schltdl.) Hiern (1877); Jacobinia catalpifolia (Nees) Vesque (1885); Jacobinia umbrosa (Benth.) S.F.Blake (1917); Jacobinia umbrosa f. erythrantha Standl. & Steyerm. (1947); Justicia aurea f. erythrantha (Standl. & Steyerm.) D.N.Gibson (1972); Justicia macdonaldii Bosse (1849); Justicia umbrosa Benth. (1841); Justicia vellasquezii Bertol. (1838)

= Justicia aurea =

Species of shrub

Justicia aurea is a species of flowering plant in the family Acanthaceae. It is a shrub native to Mexico and Central America, ranging from northeastern Mexico to Panama.
