= Justicia nodicaulis =

Scientific classification
- Kingdom: Plantae
- Clade: Tracheophytes
- Clade: Angiosperms
- Clade: Eudicots
- Clade: Asterids
- Order: Lamiales
- Family: Acanthaceae
- Genus: Justicia
- Species: J. nodicaulis

Binomial name
- Justicia nodicaulis (Nees) Leonard (1959)

Synonyms
- Amphiscopia grandis Rizzini (1952); Beloperone nodicaulis Nees (1847)

Species of flowering plant

Justicia nodicaulis is a plant native to Bolivia and west-central and southeastern Brazil, where it grows in the Cerrado ecoregion.
