= Justicia bridsoniana =

Conservation status
- Least Concern (IUCN 3.1)

Scientific classification
- Kingdom: Plantae
- Clade: Tracheophytes
- Clade: Angiosperms
- Clade: Eudicots
- Clade: Asterids
- Order: Lamiales
- Family: Acanthaceae
- Genus: Justicia
- Species: J. bridsoniana

Binomial name
- Justicia bridsoniana Vollesen

Species of plant

Justicia bridsoniana is a species of flowering plant in the family Acanthaceae. It is a scrambling shrub or subshrub native only to Tanzania. It was described by Kaj Børge Vollesen in Flora of Tropical East Africa, Acanthaceae (Part 2) 541 (2010). It is a scrambling shrub commonly found in the wet tropical biome.
