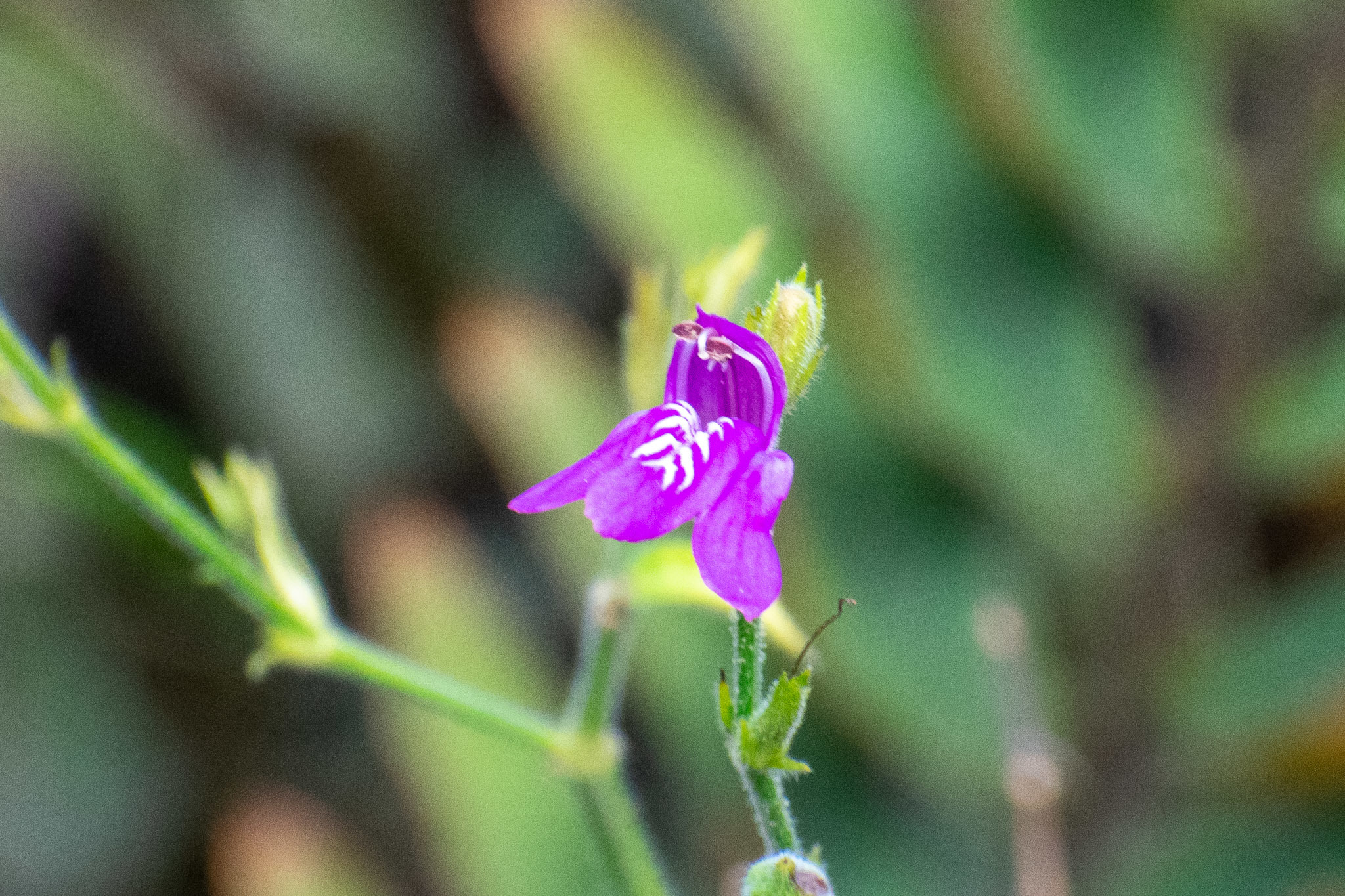
- Flower of Justicia galapagana on Santa Cruz Island, Galapagos, Ecuador

Conservation status
- Near Threatened (IUCN 2.3)

Scientific classification
- Kingdom: Plantae
- Clade: Tracheophytes
- Clade: Angiosperms
- Clade: Eudicots
- Clade: Asterids
- Order: Lamiales
- Family: Acanthaceae
- Genus: Justicia
- Species: J. galapagana

Binomial name
- Justicia galapagana Lindau ex B.L.Rob. (1902)

= Justicia galapagana =

Species of flowering plant

Justicia galapagana is a species of plant in the family Acanthaceae. It is endemic to the Galápagos Islands of Ecuador. Its flowers are a host to several insects, including the Dorantes longtail (Cecropterus dorantes), the little fire ant (Wasmannia auropunctata), and carpenter bees (Xylocopa spp).
