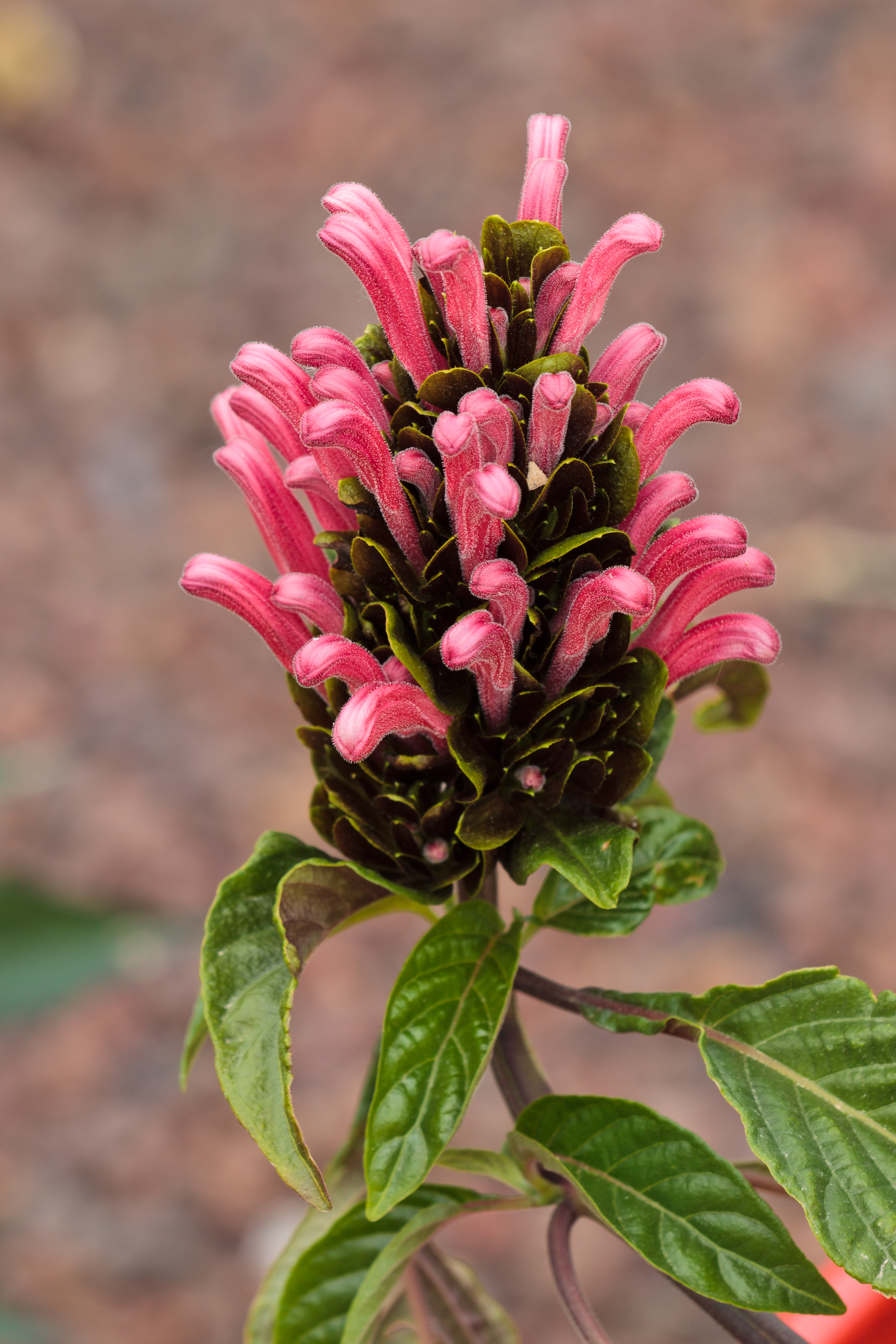

Scientific classification
- Kingdom: Plantae
- Clade: Tracheophytes
- Clade: Angiosperms
- Clade: Eudicots
- Clade: Asterids
- Order: Lamiales
- Family: Acanthaceae
- Genus: Justicia
- Species: J. carnea

Binomial name
- Justicia carnea Lindl. (1831)

Synonyms
- Synonymy: Amphiscopia ciliata (Nees) Nees (1847), nom. illeg.; Amphiscopia pohliana Nees (1847); Amphiscopia pohliana var. angustifolia Nees (1847); Cyrtanthera carnea (Lindl.) Bremek. (1948); Cyrtanthera longiflora (Vis.) Nees (1847); Cyrtanthera magnifica Nees (1847); Cyrtanthera magnifica var. minor Nees (1847); Cyrtanthera pohliana Nees (1847); Cyrtanthera pohliana var. obtusior Nees (1847); Cyrtanthera pohliana var. velutina Nees (1847); Dianthera pohliana (Nees) G.Nicholson (1884); Dianthera pohliana f. angustifolia Voss (1894); Ecbolium pohlianun (Nees) Kuntze (1891); Ecbolium sellinii Kuntze (1891); Ethesia carnea Raf. (1838); Jacobinia carnea (Lindl.) G.Nicholson (1885); Jacobinia magnifica (Nees) Lindau (1895); Jacobinia magnifica var. carnea (Lindl.) L.H.Bailey (1900), nom. superfl.; Jacobinia obtusior L.H.Bailey (1923); Jacobinia pohliana (Nees) Benth. & Hook.f. ex B.D.Jacks. (1893); Jacobinia pohliana f. velutina (Nees) Voss (1894); Jacobinia splendens Voss (1894), pro syn.; Justicia longiflora Vis. (1839); Justicia magnifica Pohl ex Nees (1847); Justicia velutina Brongn. ex Lem. (1849); Orthotactus ciliatus Nees (1847); Orthotactus pohlianus Nees (1847); Orthotactus pohlianus var. angustifolius Nees (1847); Porphyrocoma longifolia Voss (1894), pro syn.; Porphyrocoma pohliana (Nees) Lindau (1893)

= Justicia carnea =

Species of flowering plant

Justicia carnea, the Brazilian plume flower, Brazilian-plume, flamingo flower, or jacobinia, is a flowering plant in the family Acanthaceae.

The perennial plant is native to the Atlantic Forest ecoregions of eastern Brazil, Misiones Province of northeastern Argentina, and Paraguay.

It is cultivated and sold as a decorative potted plant and is planted in landscaping as a feature plant in warm temperate and subtropical climates.

== See also ==
- List of plants of Atlantic Forest vegetation of Brazil
- Justicia — common names include water-willow and shrimp plant.
- Ecoregions of the Atlantic Forest biome
