= Justicia takhinensis =

Conservation status
- Endangered (IUCN 3.1)

Scientific classification
- Kingdom: Plantae
- Clade: Tracheophytes
- Clade: Angiosperms
- Clade: Eudicots
- Clade: Asterids
- Order: Lamiales
- Family: Acanthaceae
- Genus: Justicia
- Species: J. takhinensis

Binomial name
- Justicia takhinensis R.Atk. (2004)

Species of flowering plant

Justicia takhinensis is a species of plant in the family Acanthaceae. It is endemic to northeastern Socotra, an island which is part of Yemen. Its natural habitat is subtropical or tropical dry shrubland.
