= Justicia alexandri =

Conservation status
- Vulnerable (IUCN 3.1)

Scientific classification
- Kingdom: Plantae
- Clade: Tracheophytes
- Clade: Angiosperms
- Clade: Eudicots
- Clade: Asterids
- Order: Lamiales
- Family: Acanthaceae
- Genus: Justicia
- Species: J. alexandri

Binomial name
- Justicia alexandri R.Atkinson

Species of flowering plant

Justicia alexandri is a rare species of plants in the family Acanthaceae with a very limited area of occupancy. It is endemic to the island of Socotra in Yemen. Its natural habitat is rocky areas.
