= Justicia leucoxiphus =

Conservation status
- Endangered (IUCN 3.1)

Scientific classification
- Kingdom: Plantae
- Clade: Tracheophytes
- Clade: Angiosperms
- Clade: Eudicots
- Clade: Asterids
- Order: Lamiales
- Family: Acanthaceae
- Genus: Justicia
- Species: J. leucoxiphus

Binomial name
- Justicia leucoxiphus Vollesen, Cheek & Ghogue (2004)

Species of flowering plant

Justicia leucoxiphus is a species of plant in the family Acanthaceae. It is endemic to Cameroon. Its natural habitat is subtropical or tropical moist lowland forests. It is threatened by habitat loss.
