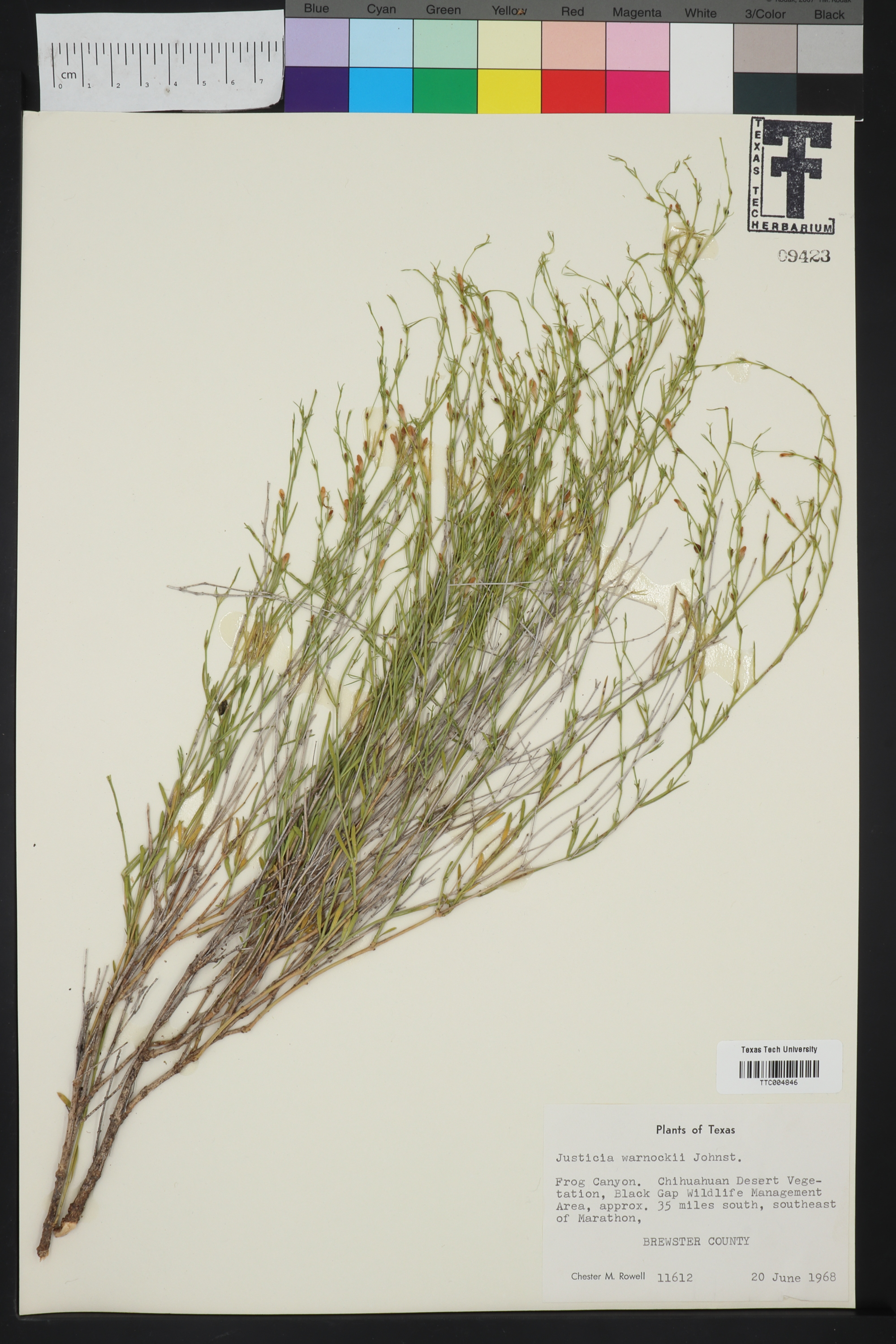

Conservation status
- Vulnerable (NatureServe)

Scientific classification
- Kingdom: Plantae
- Clade: Tracheophytes
- Clade: Angiosperms
- Clade: Eudicots
- Clade: Asterids
- Order: Lamiales
- Family: Acanthaceae
- Genus: Justicia
- Species: J. warnockii

Binomial name
- Justicia warnockii B.L.Turner (1951)

= Justicia warnockii =

Species of flowering plant

Justicia warnockii, or Warnock's water-willow, is a species of Justicia in the family Acanthaceae. It is native to Texas and northeastern Mexico. It grows in the desert and dry shrubland biome. It was first published in 1951 by Billie Lee Turner. The specific epithet honors American botanist Barton Holland Warnock.

== Description ==
The leaves are simple, opposite, and linear. The flowers are bisexual, which means that there are both male and female flowers. The inflorescence is axillary and terminal. The fruit type is a capsule. The height can get up to 40 centimeters tall. The few flowers are creamy-white to pale pink in color, or pink petals with purple streaks. The bloom time was between the months of May to October.
