= Justicia rigida =

Conservation status
- Least Concern (IUCN 3.1)

Scientific classification
- Kingdom: Plantae
- Clade: Tracheophytes
- Clade: Angiosperms
- Clade: Eudicots
- Clade: Asterids
- Order: Lamiales
- Family: Acanthaceae
- Genus: Justicia
- Species: J. rigida

Binomial name
- Justicia rigida Balf.f. (1883)

Synonyms
- Ecbolium balfourii Kuntze (1891)

Species of plant

Justicia rigida is a species of plant in the family Acanthaceae. It is a subshrub endemic to the island of Socotra in Yemen. Its natural habitats are subtropical or tropical dry shrubland and subtropical or tropical dry lowland grassland.
