= Justicia polita =

Scientific classification
- Kingdom: Plantae
- Clade: Tracheophytes
- Clade: Angiosperms
- Clade: Eudicots
- Clade: Asterids
- Order: Lamiales
- Family: Acanthaceae
- Genus: Justicia
- Species: J. polita

Binomial name
- Justicia polita (Nees) Profice (1996)

Synonyms
- Jacobinia polita Hiern (1877); Justicia pulchra Pohl ex Nees (1847); Sericographis polita Nees (1847); Sericographis polita var. pulchra Nees (1847); Sericographis polita var. umbrosa Nees (1847)

Species of flowering plant

Justicia angustifolia is a plant native to the Atlantic Forest region of southeastern Brazil.
