= Justicia breedlovei =

Scientific classification
- Kingdom: Plantae
- Clade: Tracheophytes
- Clade: Angiosperms
- Clade: Eudicots
- Clade: Asterids
- Order: Lamiales
- Family: Acanthaceae
- Genus: Justicia
- Species: J. breedlovei

Binomial name
- Justicia breedlovei T.F.Daniel

Species of flowering plant

Justicia breedlovei is a species in the family Acanthaceae. It is found in Guatemala and Chiapas, Mexico. It grows in the wet tropical biome. It was first published in 1995 by Thomas Franklin Daniel.
