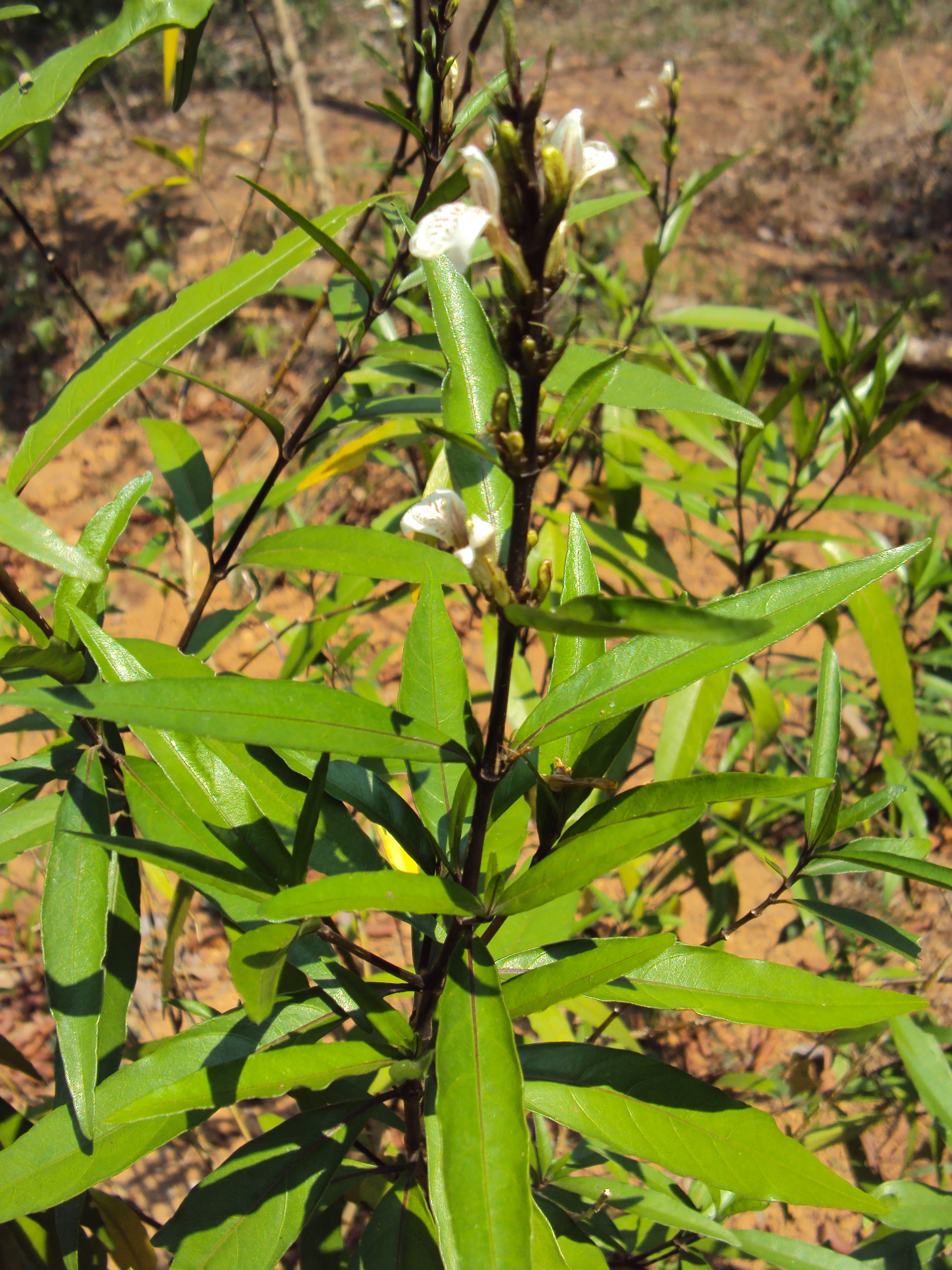

Scientific classification
- Kingdom: Plantae
- Clade: Tracheophytes
- Clade: Angiosperms
- Clade: Eudicots
- Clade: Asterids
- Order: Lamiales
- Family: Acanthaceae
- Genus: Justicia
- Species: J. gendarussa

Binomial name
- Justicia gendarussa Burm.f.

Synonyms
- Adhatoda subserrata Nees (1847); Dianthera subserrata Blanco (1837); Dicliptera rheedei Kostel. (1834); Ecbolium gendarussa (Burm.f.) Kuntze (1891); Ecbolium gendarussa var. angustifolium Kuntze (1891); Ecbolium subserratum Kuntze (1891); Gendarussa vulgaris Nees (1832); Justicia dahona Buch.-Ham. ex Wall. (1830); Justicia gandarussa L.f. (1782), orth. var.; Justicia gendarussa var. angustifolia (Kuntze) Hochr. (1934); Justicia salicina Vahl ex Nees (1847)

= Justicia gendarussa =

Species of shrub

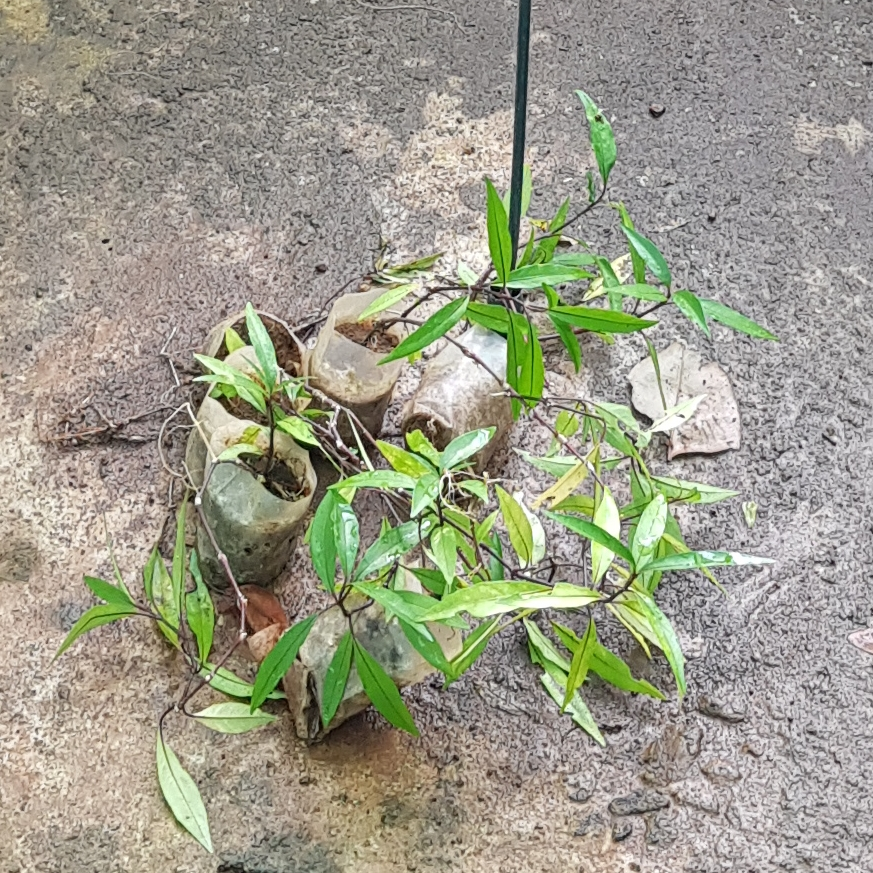
plantlings

Justicia gendarussa, commonly known as Willow-leaved justicia (Marathi: बाकस, bakas, काळा अडुळसा, kala adulasa; Sanskrit: कसनः, kasanah, वैध्यसिंहा, vaidyasinha), Lapsulis in Creole Seychelles; is a small erect, branched shrub. According to Plants of the World Online it is native to the Indian subcontinent (India, Bangladesh, Sri Lanka, and Bhutan), Indochina, Peninsular Malaysia, Sumatra, the Philippines, and New Guinea, and has been introduced to Nepal, the western Himalayas, Pakistan, southern China including Hainan and Taiwan, eastern Africa, and the Mascarene Islands, Comoro Islands, and Seychelles. It has been described as rare and endemic to India, though those claims are at least confusing, in the context of statements that the plant is widely used in various forms for many of its medicinal and insecticidal properties, and that it is a quick-growing, evergreen forest shrub considered to be a native of China and distributed in Sri Lanka, India and Malaysia.

J. gendarussa is harvested for its leaves for the treatment of various ailments. It is said to be useful for the treatment of asthma, rheumatism and colics of children. Used as a treatment for skin problems like eczema. It may have the potential to be the basis for a birth control pill for men. Clinical tests are being conducted in Indonesia.

The plant has shown promise as a source of a compound that inhibits an enzyme crucial to the development of HIV.

== Description ==
J. gendarussa is an erect, branched shrub which belongs to the family of Acanthaceae. It is a dicotyledonous plant that can reach heights up to 1.5 m. Its leaves are lanceolate, 4–14 cm long and 1–2.5 cm wide. The color of the leaves can be white, green or grey and hairy on both sides. They are bitter, acrid and thermogenic. The rather small flowers grow as 4–12 cm long spikes at the end of branches or in leaf axils. The color of the flowers is white or pink with purple spots. The flowers are hermaphrodite and the bark has a dark purple. The capsule of J. gendarussa is about 1.2 cm long and smooth. The plant contains a wide range of biologically active compounds like flavonoids, alkaloids, steroids and phenolic compounds.

== Cultivation ==
The plant prefers shadow and therefore is distributed in the forests of India, Malaysia and Sri Lanka. J. gendarussa is harvested from the wild. Because of its wide range of medicinal use, this causes jeopardizing of its natural biodiversity. Combined with the habitat destruction this uncontrolled harvesting causes the decline of the population. In addition, the plant is propagated by seeds, whose viability is only for a very short period of time. For all this reason it is important to look for alternative and sustainable methods to cultivate and to conserve the plant.

The hydroponic system is an alternative cultivation method for large-scale production. Explants of the J. gendarussa are placed in thermocole sheets and then put into water. The water contains a nutrient solution. There is the possibility to add plant growth regulators, e.g. Indole-3butyric acid, to increase the biomass production especially in the beginning phase to initiate root growth. The temperature is set between 28° and 34 °C and the plants can be harvested after 50 days.

The silviculture presents a possibility for an improved production of J. gendarussa. Possible fertilizers are chicken manure and bamboo charcoal at a rate of 1.5 t/ha.

The plant has a high root infection and strong mycorrhizal association. The arbuscular mycorrhizal fungus plays an important role for the soil fertility and the maintenance of the plant vigor due to its influence on microflora and nutrient cycle. The association with mycorrhiza can increase the growth and yield of the plant.

== Medicine ==
J. gendarussa was proved to contain several phytochemicals, which are natural secondary plant compounds. Overall in the plant, roots, stem and leaves, following phytochemicals were found: alkaloids, flavonoids, tannins and phenols. The ingredients of the plant may vary depending on the age, physiological stage of the organ parts or the geographic region of cultivation.

The plant was proved to have both anti-microbial and anti-fungal action on selected pathogen strains, and therefore this plant can be used to develop herbal drugs.

J. gendarussa leaf extract was proven to potentially become a male, non-hormonally contraceptive method due to its competitive and reversible inhibition of the spermatozoon hyaluronidase enzyme. The plant is already used as traditional contraceptive method in Indonesia.

The plant compound Patentiflorin A contained in J. gendarussa has shown to have a positive activity against several HIV strains, higher than the clinically used first anti-HIV drug, zidovudine AZT.

Further, extracts of the leaves have an anti-inflammatory effect. This has been demonstrated especially in mice, specific for the carrageenan-induced paw edema.

The juice of the leaves can be drizzled into the ear for earache. To treat external edema, an oil made from the leaves can be used.

== Other uses ==
J. gendarussa can be considered as a potential phytoremediator. It can absorb high amounts of aluminium, iron and copper in leaves, roots and stems. The problem is that when the plant is used as a phytoremediator, it can no longer be used for medicinal use.
