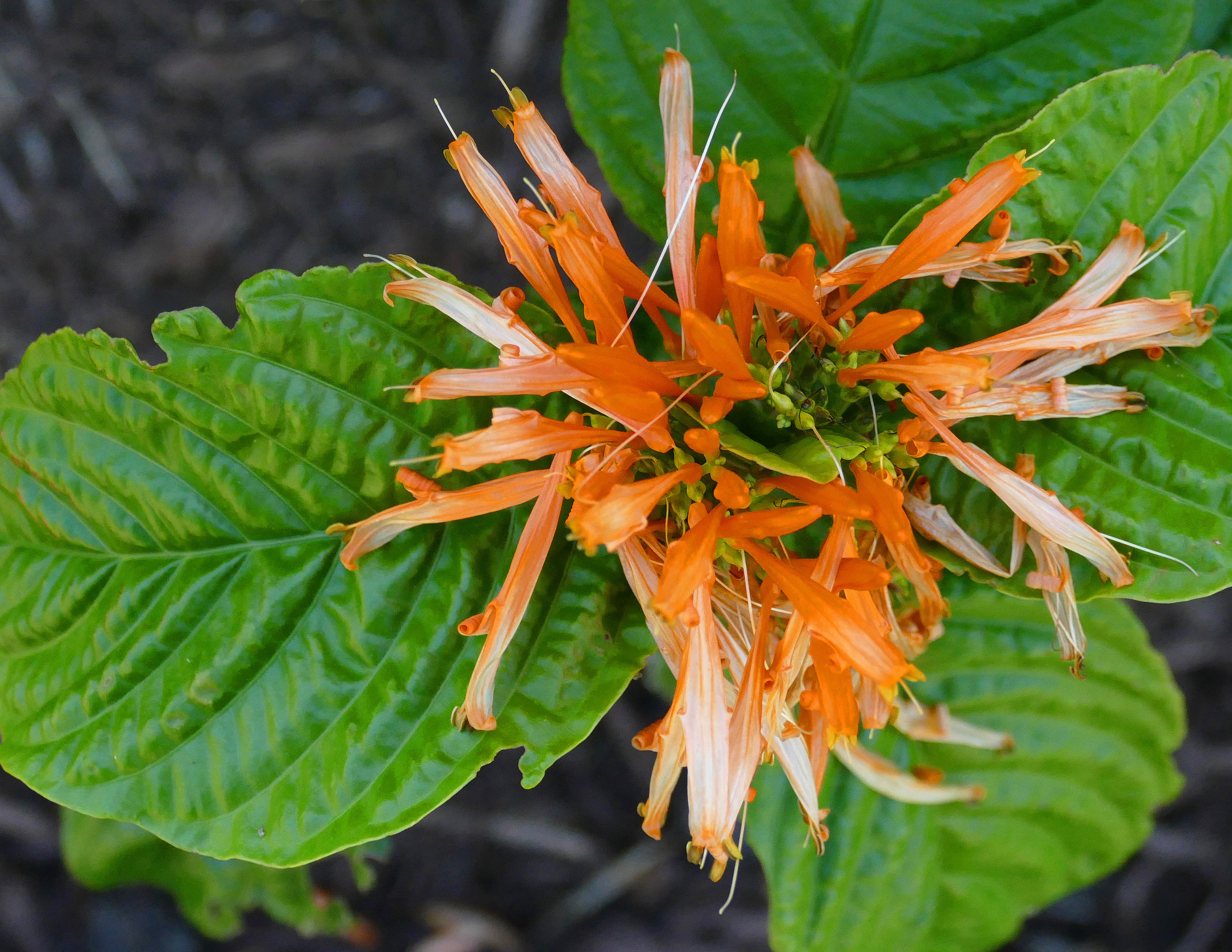
- Mexican honeysuckle: Justicia spicigera
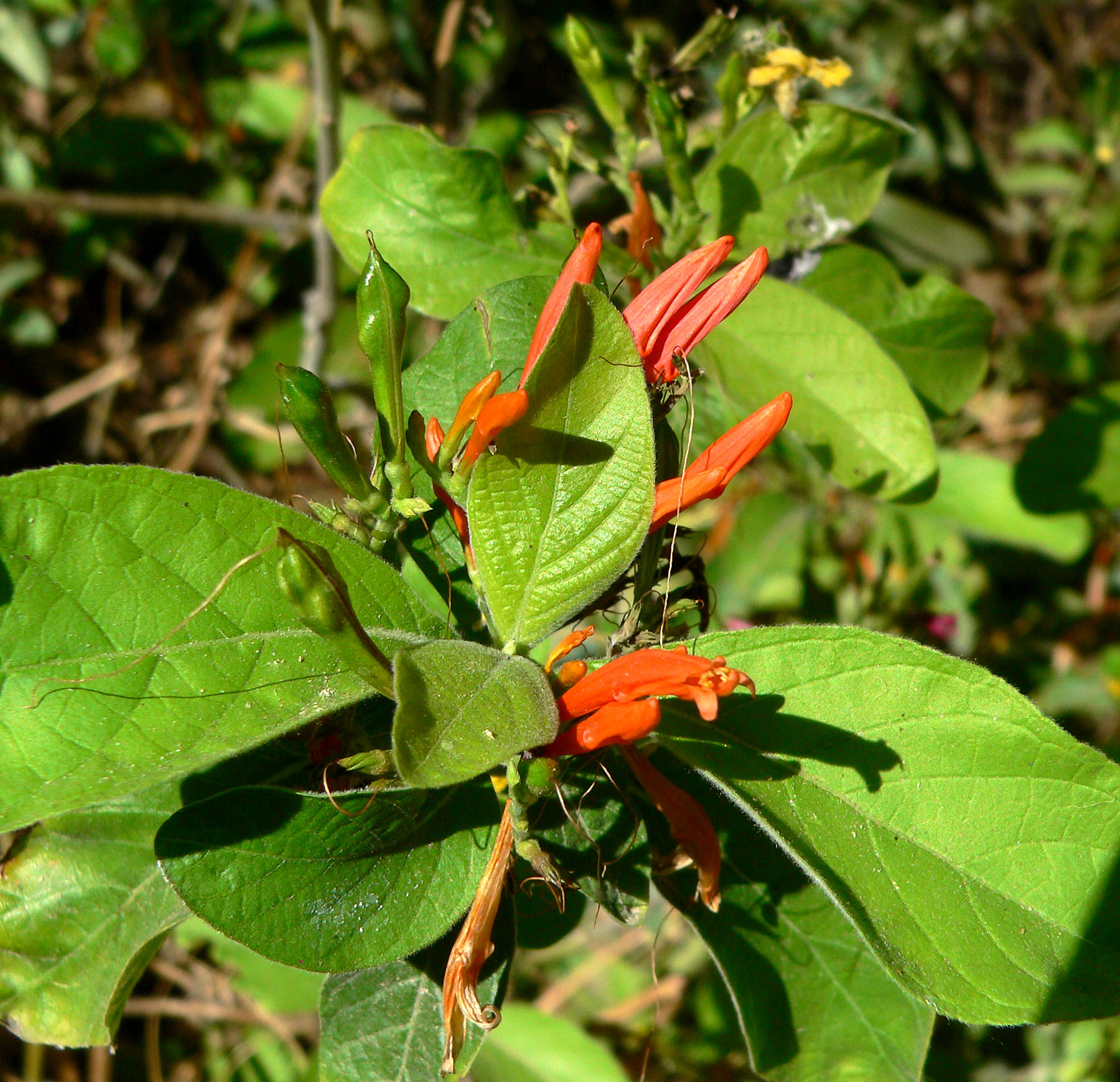

Scientific classification
- Kingdom: Plantae
- Clade: Tracheophytes
- Clade: Angiosperms
- Clade: Eudicots
- Clade: Asterids
- Order: Lamiales
- Family: Acanthaceae
- Genus: Justicia
- Species: J. spicigera

Binomial name
- Justicia spicigera Schltdl. (1832)

Synonyms
- Synonymy: Aphelandra ghiesbreghtiana (Lem.) Lem. (1848); Cyrtanthera ghiesbreghtiana (Lem.) Decne. (1848); Drejera willdenowiana Nees (1847); Jacobinia atramentaria (Benth.) S.F.Blake (1917); Jacobinia ghiesbreghtiana (Lem.) Benth. & Hook.f. (1876); Jacobinia mohintli Hemsl. (1882), nom. superfl.; Jacobinia neglecta A.Gray (1878); Jacobinia scarlatina S.F.Blake (1917); Jacobinia spicigera (Schltdl.) L.H.Bailey (1915); Justicia atramentaria Benth. (1840); Justicia ghiesbreghtiana Lem. (1847); Justicia ghiesbreghtii Lem. (1848), orth. var.; Justicia liebmanii V.A.W.Graham (1988); Justicia mohintli Moc. & Sessé ex Nees (1847), pro syn.; Justicia scarlatina (S.F.Blake) V.A.W.Graham (1988); Sericographis ghiesbreghtiana (Lem.) Nees (1847); Sericographis neglecta Oerst. (1855); Sericographis mohintli Nees (1847), nom. superfl.

= Justicia spicigera =

Species of plant

Justicia spicigera (Mexican honeysuckle, firecracker bush, moyotle, moyotli, mohintli, muicle, trompetilla, yaxan, or ych-kaan in Mayan) is an evergreen shrub with tubular orange flowers. The species is native to the Bahamas, Belize, Colombia, Costa Rica, El Salvador, Guatemala, Hispaniola (the Dominican Republic and Haiti), Honduras, and Mexico.

== Description ==
Muicle shrubs grow perennially in full sun or partial shade, and typically reach heights of between 2–5 feet. Their leaves are around 2 inches long, and their bright orange flowers attract hummingbirds. They prefer warm weather, but can tolerate temperatures down to about -3 °C (26 °F). Muicle is known to have purple, pink, green, and orange colors when the leaves are boiled. Different pH values on muicle extracts modified the structure of the molecules and solubility, so depending on the pH of the plant, the color will vary.

=== Phytochemicals ===
The leaves and flowers contain various phytochemicals, including carbohydrates, pectins, flavonoids, tannins, essential oils, and minerals.

== Uses ==
Muicle can be made into a tea by boiling the leaves in water. As the leaves boil, they dye the water deep blue or indigo, explaining why the plant has also been traditionally used to make dye. Muicle has been used as a traditional medicine for the treatment of various ailments. Muicle is often used as a brightening agent in laundry.
