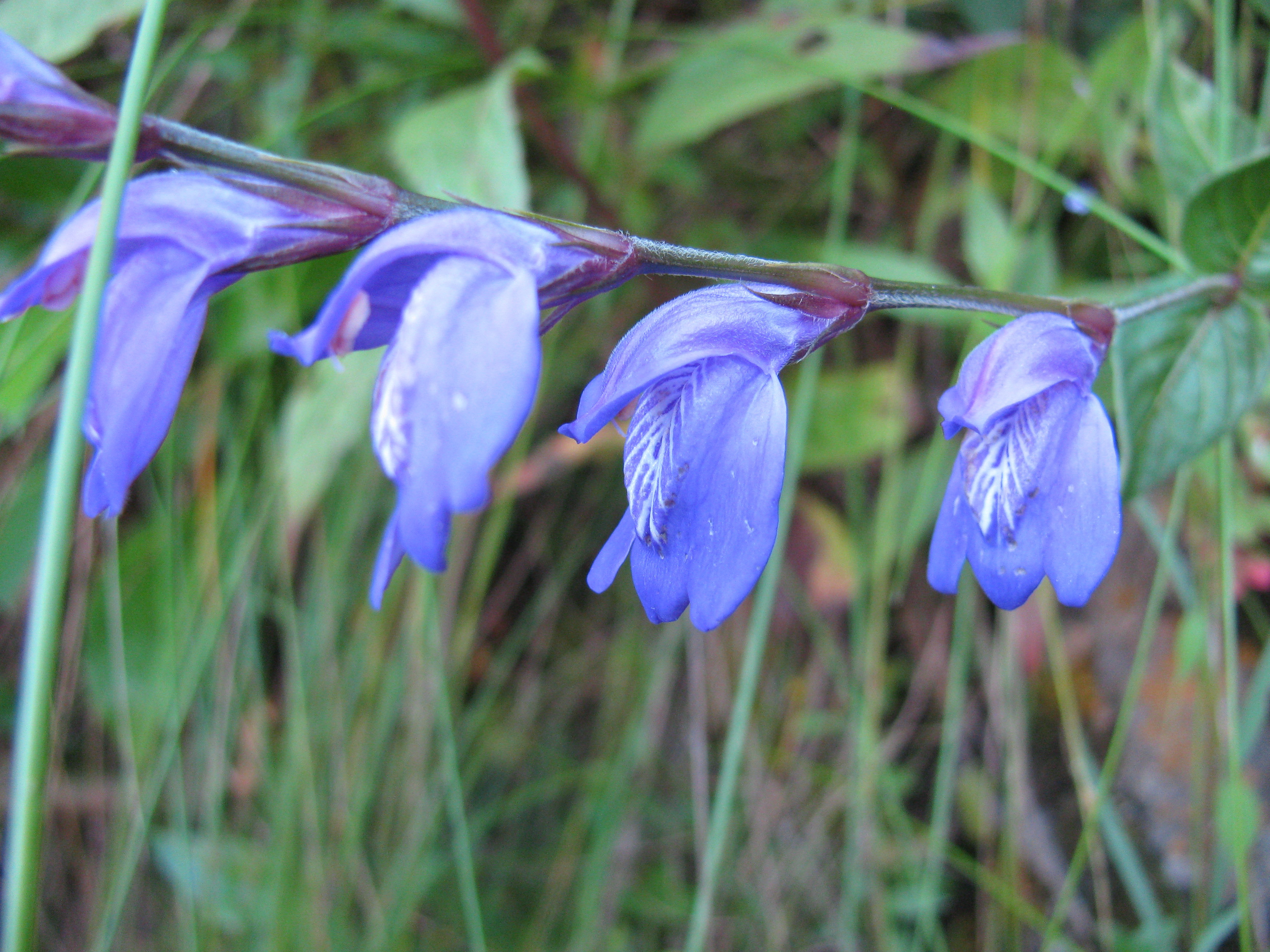

Scientific classification
- Kingdom: Plantae
- Clade: Tracheophytes
- Clade: Angiosperms
- Clade: Eudicots
- Clade: Asterids
- Order: Lamiales
- Family: Acanthaceae
- Genus: Justicia
- Species: J. alpina

Binomial name
- Justicia alpina Lindau

= Justicia alpina =

Species of flowering plant

Justicia alpina is a species of plant in the family Acanthaceae. It is endemic to Peru.
