= Justicia riopalenquensis =

Conservation status
- Vulnerable (IUCN 3.1)

Scientific classification
- Kingdom: Plantae
- Clade: Tracheophytes
- Clade: Angiosperms
- Clade: Eudicots
- Clade: Asterids
- Order: Lamiales
- Family: Acanthaceae
- Genus: Justicia
- Species: J. riopalenquensis

Binomial name
- Justicia riopalenquensis Wassh.

Species of flowering plant

Justicia riopalenquensis is a species of plant in the family Acanthaceae. It is endemic to Ecuador. Its natural habitats are subtropical or tropical moist lowland forests and subtropical or tropical moist montane forests. It is threatened by habitat loss.
