= Justicia triloba =

Scientific classification
- Kingdom: Plantae
- Clade: Tracheophytes
- Clade: Angiosperms
- Clade: Eudicots
- Clade: Asterids
- Order: Lamiales
- Family: Acanthaceae
- Genus: Justicia
- Species: J. triloba

Binomial name
- Justicia triloba (Lindau) E.C.O.Chagas & Costa-Lima (2022)

Synonyms
- Anisacanthus trilobus Lindau (1914); Harpochilus trimerocalyx Rizzini (1948)

Species of flowering plant

Justicia triloba is a species of flowering plant in the family Acanthaceae. It a shrub native to the Caatinga vegetation and Cerrado vegetation of Brazil, ranging from Tocantins to Piauí and Minas Gerais states.
