= Justicia tocantina =

Scientific classification
- Kingdom: Plantae
- Clade: Tracheophytes
- Clade: Angiosperms
- Clade: Eudicots
- Clade: Asterids
- Order: Lamiales
- Family: Acanthaceae
- Genus: Justicia
- Species: J. tocantina

Binomial name
- Justicia tocantina (Nees) V.A.W.Graham (1988)

Synonyms
- Chaetothylax tocantinus Nees (1847)

Species of flowering plant

Justicia tocantina is a species of perennial flowering plant native to Bolivia, west-central and southeastern Brazil, and Paraguay, including the Cerrado ecoregion of Brazil. This plant is cited in Flora Brasiliensis by Carl Friedrich Philipp von Martius.
