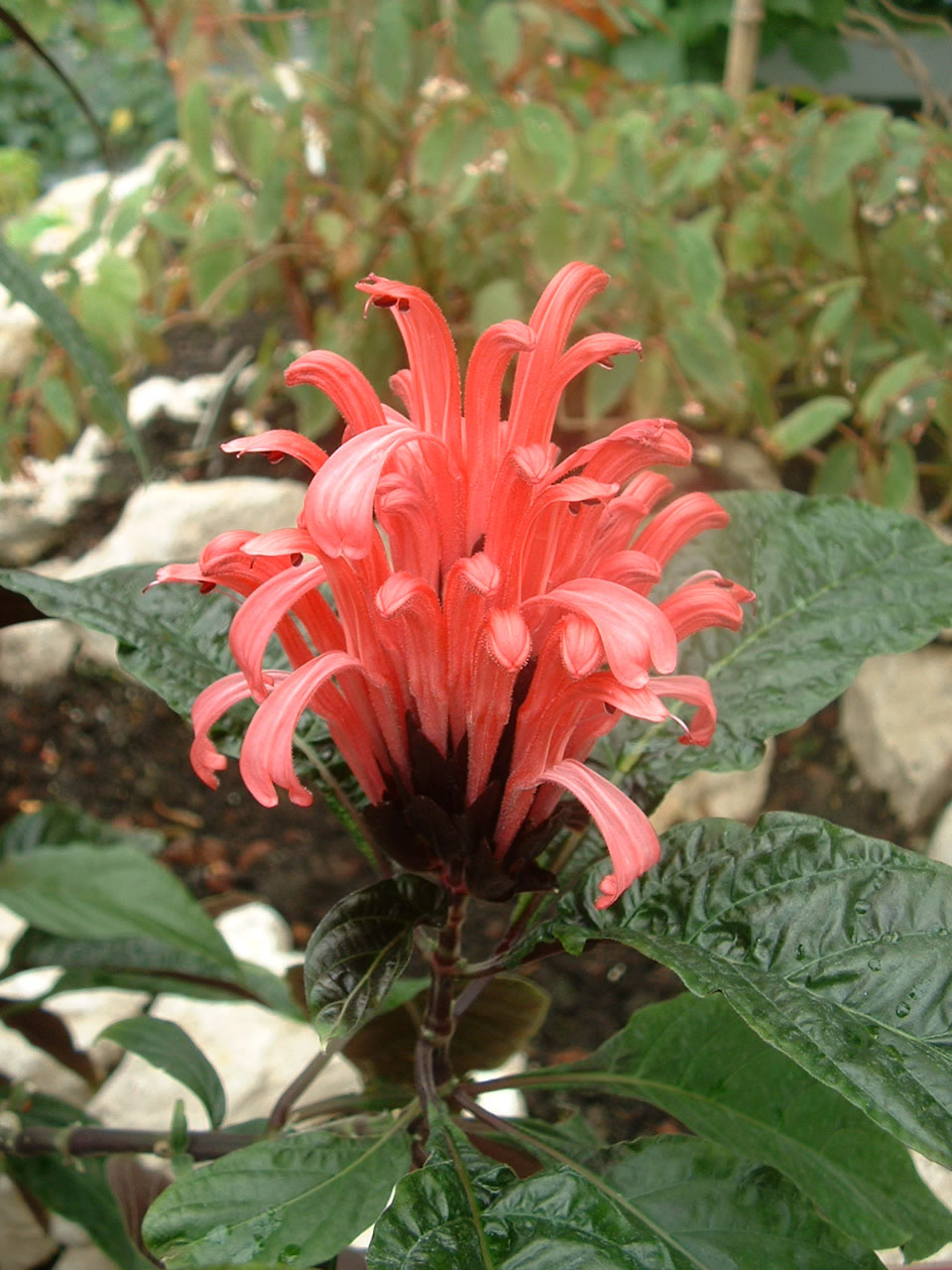
- Justicia carnea

Scientific classification
- Kingdom: Plantae
- Clade: Embryophytes
- Clade: Tracheophytes
- Clade: Spermatophytes
- Clade: Angiosperms
- Clade: Eudicots
- Clade: Asterids
- Order: Lamiales
- Family: Acanthaceae
- Subfamily: Acanthoideae
- Tribe: Justicieae
- Genus: Justicia; L. (1753), nom. cons.

Species
- Over 900, see list of Justicia species

Synonyms
- List: Acelica Rizzini; Adatoda Raf.; Adeloda Raf.; Adhatoda Mill.; Athlianthus Endl.; Aulojusticia Lindau; Beloperone Nees; Beloperonides Oerst.; Bentia Rolfe; Calliaspidia Bremek.; Calophanoides (C.B.Clarke) Ridl.; Calymmostachya Bremek.; Carima Raf.; Chaetochlamys Lindau; Chaetothylax Nees; Chaetothylopsis Oerst.; Chiloglossa Oerst.; Cyphisia Rizzini; Cyrtanthera Nees; Cyrtantherella Oerst.; Digyroloma Turcz.; Dimanisa Raf.; Drejerella Lindau; Duvernoia Nees; Duvernoya E.Mey.; Dyspemptemorion Bremek.; Ecbolium Riv. ex Kuntze; Emularia Raf.; Ethesia Raf.; Gendarussa Nees; Glosarithys Rizzini; Gromovia Regel; Harnieria Solms; Heinzelia Nees; Hemichoriste Nees; Heteraspidia Rizzini; Ixtlania M.E.Jones; Jacobinia Moric.; Kuestera Regel; Leptostachya Nees; Libonia K.Koch; Lophothecium Rizzini; Lustrinia Raf.; Mananthes Bremek.; Megalostoma Leonard; Neohallia Hemsl.; Orthotactus Nees; Pelecostemon Leonard; Petalanthera Raf.; Plegmatolemma Bremek.; Porphyrocoma Scheidw. ex Hook.; Pupilla Rizzini; Rhyticalymma Bremek.; Roslinia Neck.; Salviacanthus Lindau; Sarojusticia Bremek.; Sarotheca Nees; × Sericobonia Linden & André; Sericographis Nees; Simonisia Nees; Siphonoglossa Oerst.; Thalestris Rizzini; Thamnojusticia Mildbr.; Tyloglossa Hochst.; Vada-kodi Adans.

= Justicia (plant) =

Genus of flowering plants

Justicia is a genus of flowering plants in the family Acanthaceae. It is the largest genus within the family, with over 900 accepted species. They are native to tropical to warm temperate regions of the Americas, India, and Africa. The genus serves as host to many butterfly species, such as Anartia fatima. Common names include water-willow and shrimp plant, the latter from the inflorescences, which resemble a shrimp in some species. The generic name honours Scottish horticulturist James Justice (1698–1763). They are closely related to Pachystachys.

== Description ==
They are evergreen, perennial plants and shrubs with leaves that are often strongly veined, but they are primarily cultivated for their showy, tubular flowers in shades of white, cream, yellow, orange, violet, or pink. Excepting J. americana L., they are not hardy below 7 °C (45 °F), so must be grown under glass in frost-prone areas.

== Selected species ==
915 species are accepted. Selected species include:

- Justicia adhatoda L.
- Justicia aequalis Benoist
- Justicia alexandri R.Atk.
- Justicia alpina Lindau
- Justicia andrographioides C.B.Clarke
- Justicia aurea Schltdl.
- Justicia austroguangxiensis H.S.Lo & D.Fang
- Justicia bitarkarae Gómez-Laur.
- Justicia brandegeeana Wassh. & L.B.Sm.
- Justicia breedlovei T.F.Daniel
- Justicia bridsoniana Vollesen
- Justicia burchellii Hiern
- Justicia californica (Benth.) D.N.Gibson
- Justicia calliantha Leonard
- Justicia camerunensis (Heine) I.Darbysh.
- Justicia cardiophylla D.Fang & H.S.Lo
- Justicia carnea Lindl.
- Justicia chimalapensis T.F.Daniel
- Justicia chrysotrichoma (Nees) Benth. & Hook.f.
- Justicia clausseniana (Nees) Profice
- Justicia cooleyi Monach. & Leonard
- Justicia cuneata Vahl
- Justicia daidalea Leonard
- Justicia flaviflora (Turrill) Wassh.
- Justicia floribunda (K.Koch) Wassh.
- Justicia galapagana Lindau ex B.L.Rob.
- Justicia gendarussa Burm.f.
- Justicia glauca Rottler
- Justicia harlingii (Wassh.) Wassh.
- Justicia hatschbachii (Rizzini) Wassh. & L.B.Sm.
- Justicia ianthina Wassh.
- Justicia irwinii Wassh.
- Justicia lamprophylla Leonard
- Justicia lanstyakii Rizzini
- Justicia leucoxiphus Vollesen, Cheek & Ghogue
- Justicia longii Hilsenb.
- Justicia magdalenensis J.R.I.Wood
- Justicia nervata (Lindau) Profice
- Justicia nodicaulis (Nees) Leonard
- Justicia nuriana Wassh.
- Justicia oncodes (Lindau) Wassh. & C.Ezcurra
- Justicia orbicularis (Lindau) V.A.W.Graham
- Justicia petiolaris E.Mey.
- Justicia petraea Leonard
- Justicia phyllocalyx (Lindau) Wassh. & C.Ezcurra
- Justicia pilosella (Nees) Hilsenb.
- Justicia polita (Nees) Profice
- Justicia purpusii (Brandegee) D.N.Gibson
- Justicia pycnophylla Lindau
- Justicia rigida Balf.f.
- Justicia riojana Lindau
- Justicia riopalenquensis Wassh.
- Justicia riparia Kameyama
- Justicia romba Benoist
- Justicia sarothroides Lindau
- Justicia serrana Kameyama
- Justicia spicigera Schltdl.
- Justicia suarezensis Benoist
- Justicia takhinensis R.Atk.
- Justicia tenella (Nees) T. Anderson
- Justicia tobagensis (Urb.) Wassh.
- Justicia tocantina (Nees) V.A.W.Graham
- Justicia triloba (Lindau) E.C.O.Chagas & Costa-Lima
- Justicia uber C.B.Clarke
- Justicia venalis Benoist
- Justicia warmingii Hiern
- Justicia warnockii B.L.Turner
- Justicia wilhelminensis Wassh.
- Justicia xylosteoides Griseb.
- Justicia zarucchii Wassh.

J. brandegeeana (formerly Beloperone guttata, commonly called shrimp plant) is native to Mexico. It is hardy to −4 °C, but often recovers in the spring after freezing back in USDA Plant Zone 8a. J. carnea (formerly Jacobinia carnea, common names including Brazilian plume flower, flamingo flower, and jacobinia) is native to South America in southern Brazil, Paraguay, and northern Argentina. It is hardy to −2 °C but often recovers in the spring after freezing back in USDA Plant Zone 8a. J. procumbens is a procumbent herb with angular stems, swollen at the nodes, with small, ovate leaves; small, purple flowers in terminal spikes; inserted didynamous stamens; and shortly bilobed stigmata.

=== Formerly placed here ===
- Dianthera americana L. (as Justicia americana (L.) Vahl)
- Dianthera angustifolia (Nees) Benth. & Hook.f. ex B.D.Jacks. (as Justicia angustifolia (Nees) Lindau)
- Dianthera incerta Brandegee (as Justicia austrocapensis T.F.Daniel)
- Nicoteba betonica (L.) Lindau (as Justicia betonica L.)
- Rostellularia procumbens (L.) Nees (as Justicia procumbens L., J. hirtella Wall., J. japonica Thunb., and J. media R.Br.)

== Gallery ==
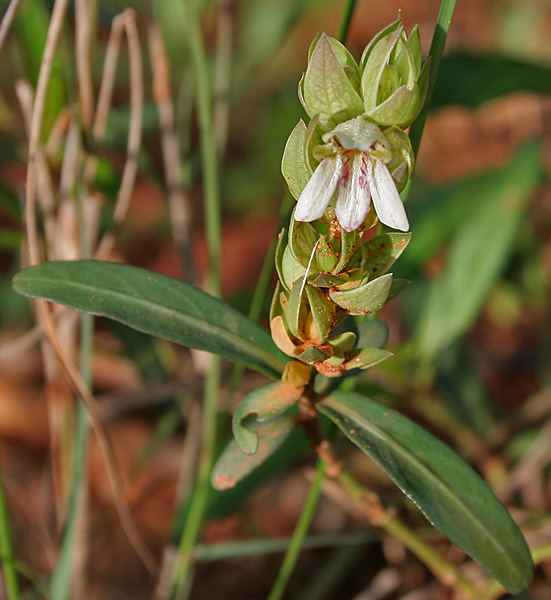
Justicia trinervia in Talakona Forest, in Chittoor District of Andhra Pradesh, India

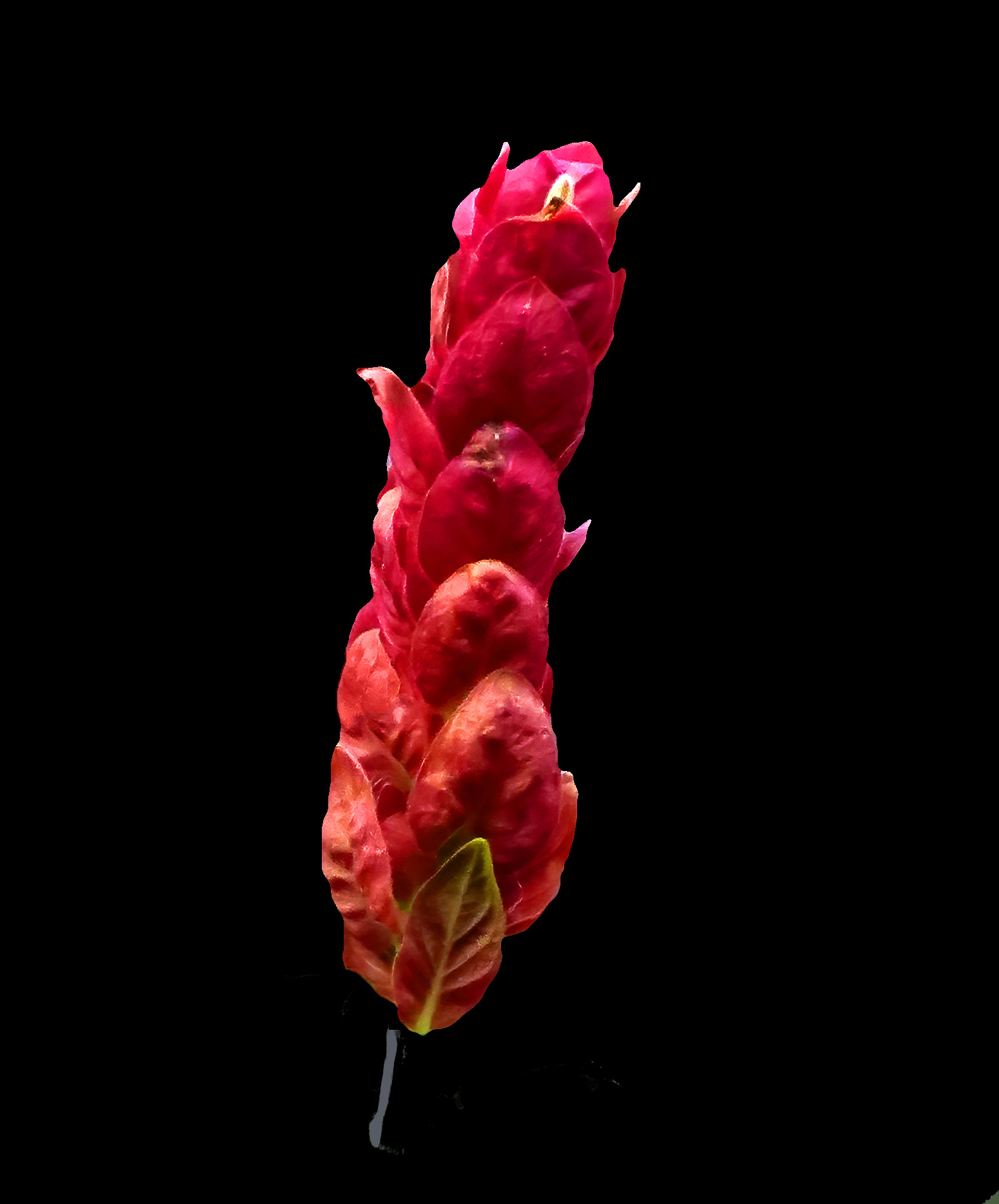
Justicia brandegeeana Texas Gulf Coast

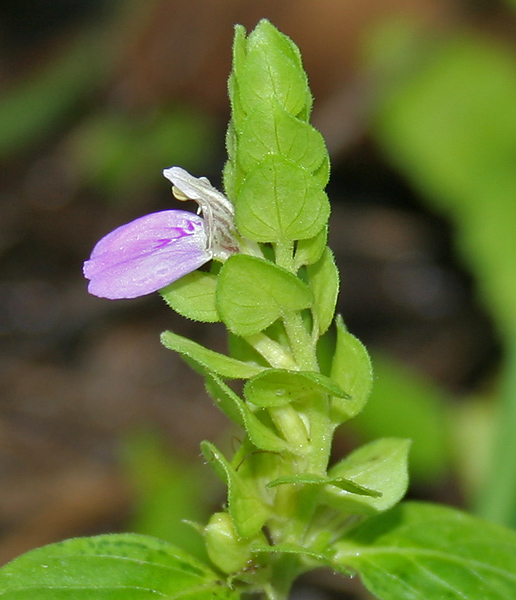
Justicia glauca in Hyderabad, India

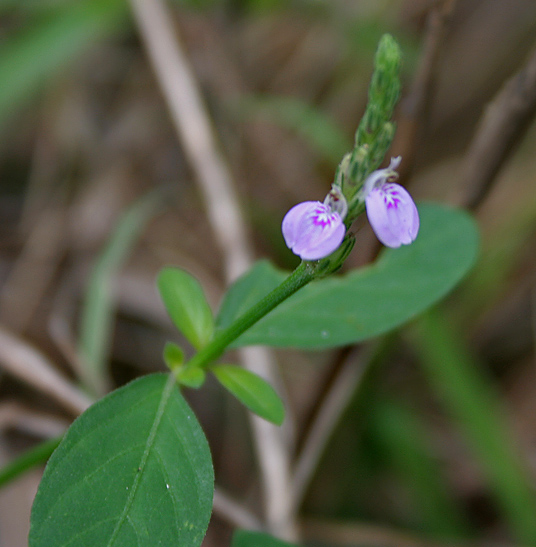
Justicia procumbens var. simplex near Talakona Forest, in Chittoor District

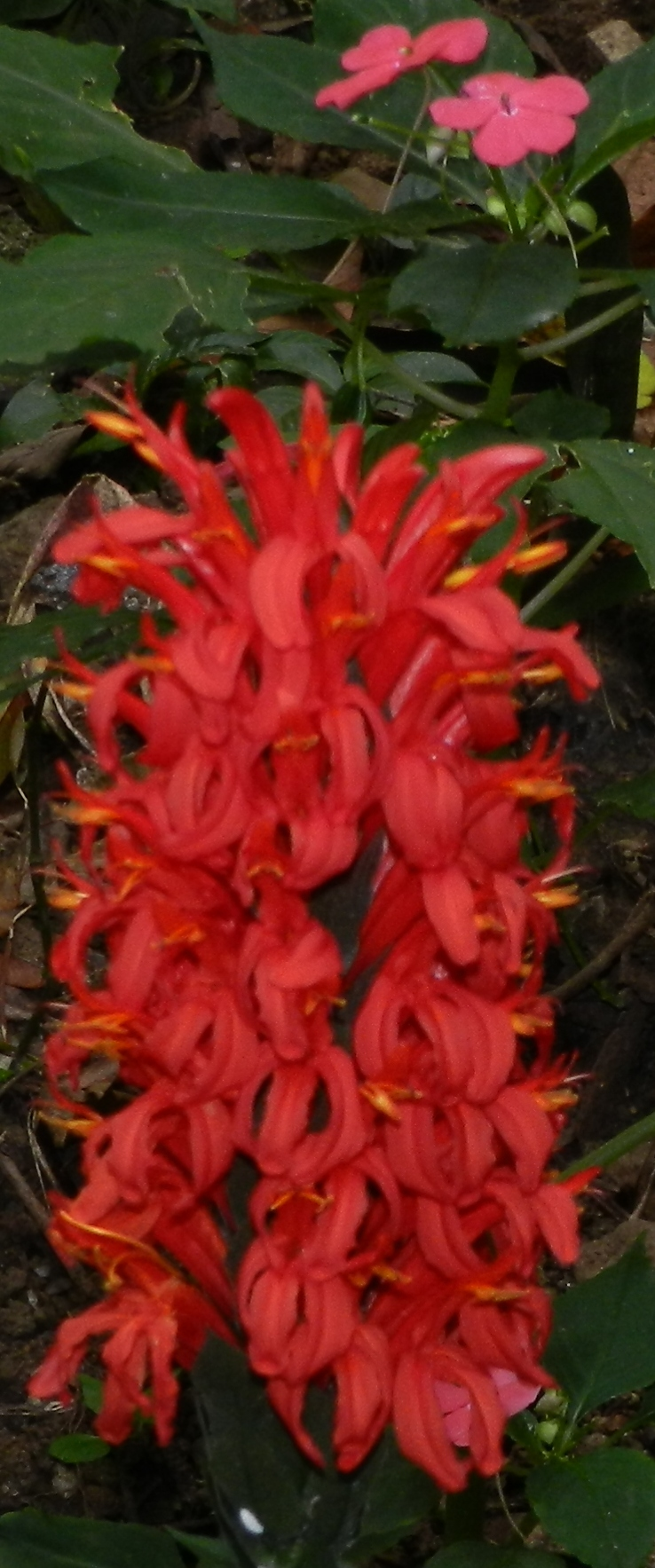
Justicia coccinea in El Crucero, Managua, Nicaragua
