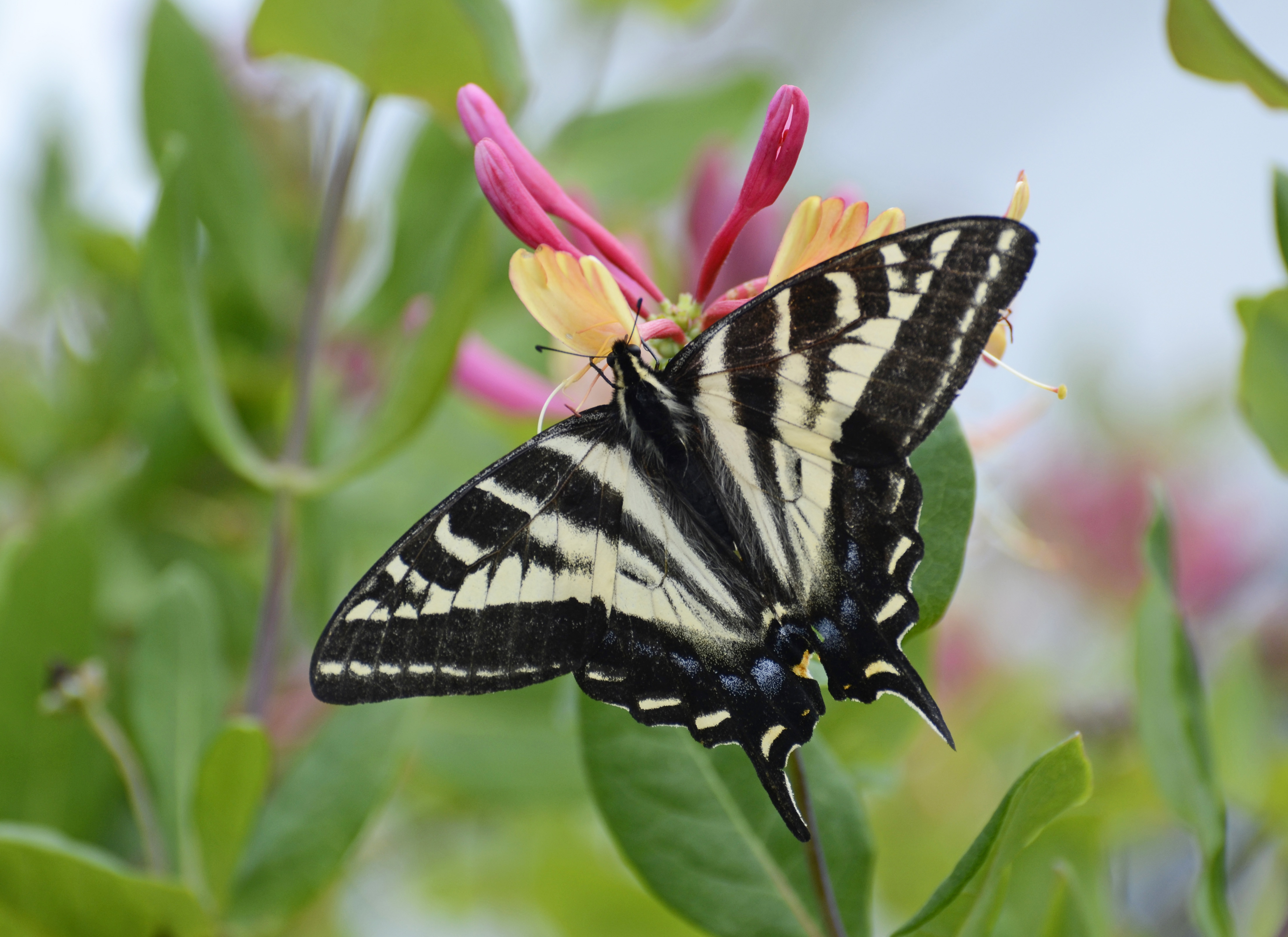

Conservation status
- Secure (NatureServe)

Scientific classification
- Kingdom: Animalia
- Phylum: Arthropoda
- Clade: Pancrustacea
- Class: Insecta
- Order: Lepidoptera
- Family: Papilionidae
- Genus: Papilio
- Species: P. eurymedon

Binomial name
- Papilio eurymedon H. Lucas, 1852
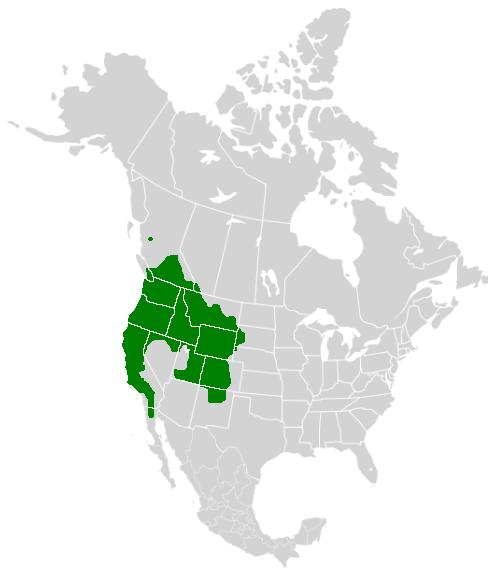

= Papilio eurymedon =

Species of butterfly

Papilio eurymedon, the pale swallowtail or pallid swallowtail, is a relatively common swallowtail butterfly found throughout much of the western North America. The species was first described by Hippolyte Lucas in 1852. It is found on the Pacific coast from northern Baja California to southernmost British Columbia, and inland to New Mexico and the Black Hills of South Dakota. It is present from the coast to western Montana, and from Wyoming to northern New Mexico. It is absent from most of Nevada and western Utah. It prefers open woodlands and forest clearings, especially near permanent bodies of water such as ponds, but also urban parks and is occasionally seen in suburban areas. Though not as common as the western tiger swallowtail, the pale swallowtail can be seen in large numbers at puddling parties where up to a dozen or more males may be gathered. There they join other species to sip water from damp soil to obtain nutrients for mating. Their appearance is quite similar to that of the western tiger swallowtail, except they are a white-cream colour or very pale yellow. Some pale swallowtails also have differing amounts of red-orange patches on the top of the wings just above the tail. There is a submarginal band on the bottom of the hindwings. Tiger stripes and borders are thicker than those of western tiger swallowtails. The wingspan is typically 3.5 to 4.5 inches (8.9 to 11.4 cm).

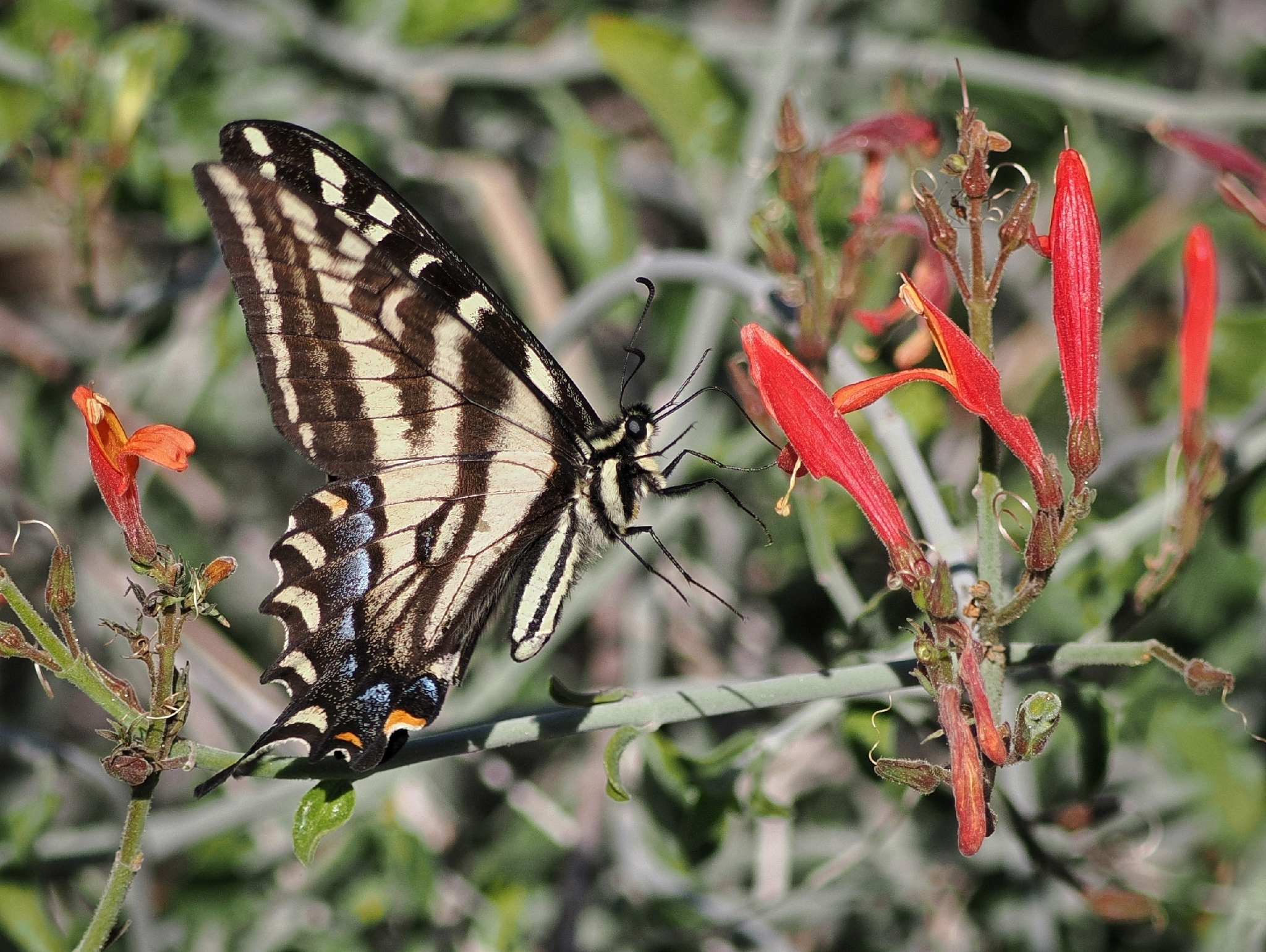
Feeding from Justicia californica

The pale swallowtail has a single brood throughout most of its range, but two or more along the Pacific Coast. Adults fly from April to October and are most common in May and July. Caterpillars enter their pupal stage in the fall and overwinter before emerging as adults. Eggs are laid singly on host plants which include members of the genus Ceanothus, including buckbrush, mountain balm, and mountain lilac, as well as red alder, ocean spray, bitter cherry, and serviceberry species. Caterpillars are plump green with a single yellow band behind the thorax. They have two eye-shaped spots on the upper thorax, which may help frighten predators. Like most swallowtails, they have a red wishbone-shaped organ called the osmeterium, which pops out from behind the head and releases a foul odour to warn off predators. Caterpillars turn brown just before the fifth moult. The pupa is brown and looks like a piece of bark. As they pupate, they face upright, secure the tip of the abdomen to a branch with a silk thread, and hang freely.

Males perch and patrol for receptive females. Females lay eggs singly on host plant leaves. Caterpillars feed on leaves and rest on silken mats in shelters of curled leaves. Pupae hibernate.
