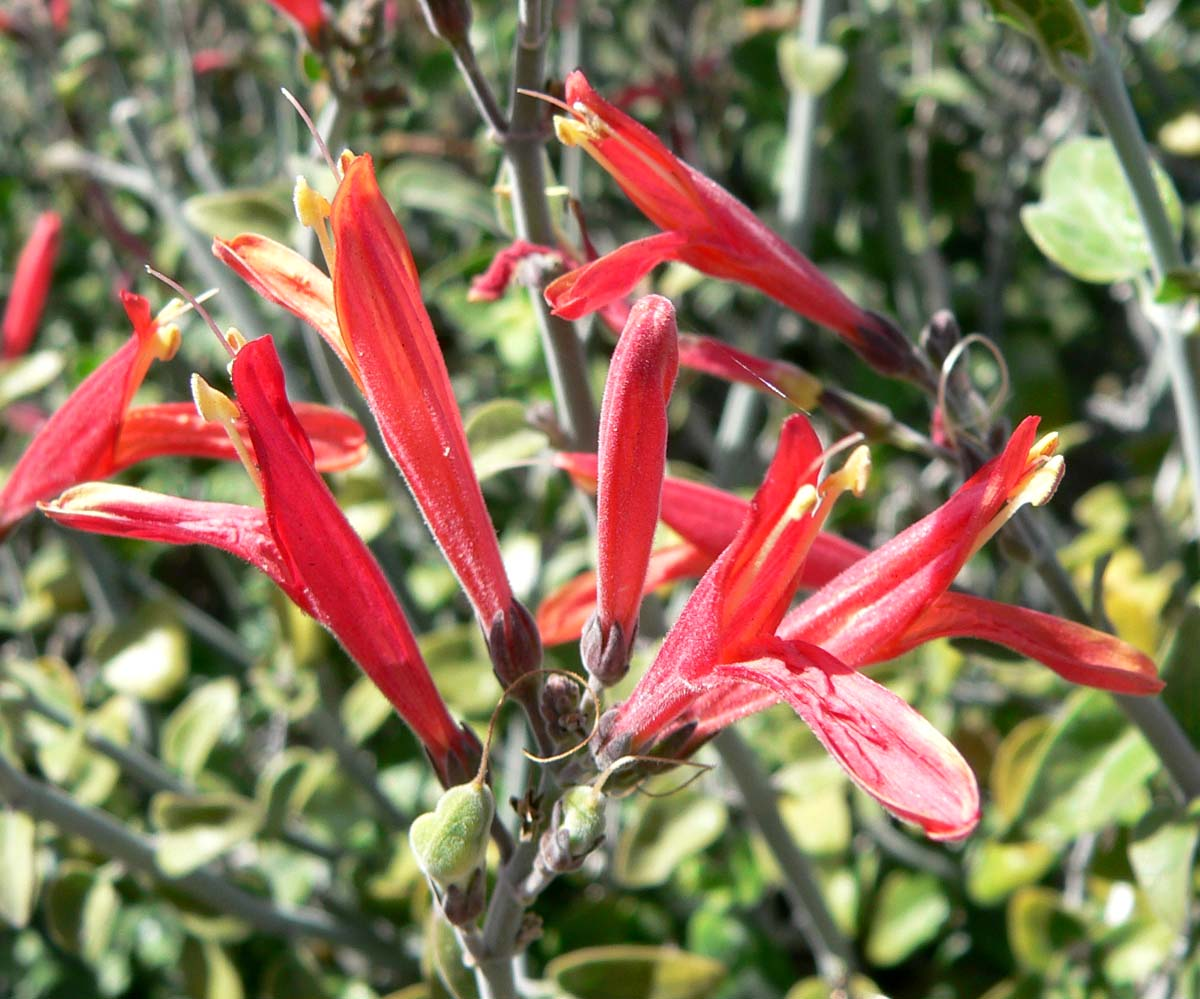

Conservation status
- Secure (NatureServe)

Scientific classification
- Kingdom: Plantae
- Clade: Tracheophytes
- Clade: Angiosperms
- Clade: Eudicots
- Clade: Asterids
- Order: Lamiales
- Family: Acanthaceae
- Genus: Justicia
- Species: J. californica

Binomial name
- Justicia californica (Benth.) D. Gibson

Synonyms
- Beloperone californica

= Justicia californica =

Species of shrub

Justicia californica is a deciduous species of flowering shrub native to the deserts of southern California, southern Arizona, and northern Mexico. Its common names include beloperone, chuparosa (from the Spanish: chuparrosa for hummingbird) and hummingbird bush.

It can grow to 1.5 metres (5 feet) in height and almost as wide. For a short time it bears succulent leaves about 1.5 centimetres (5/8 inch) in width. It loses its leaves and then produces plentiful tubular flowers about 2.5–4 cm (1–1 5/8 in) long between February and June. These are usually in shades of bright to deep red, or sometimes yellow, with a two-lobed upper lip and a wide three-lobed lower lip that falls open to reveal the inside of the blossom.

It is one of the northernmost distributed species of the mostly tropical genus Justicia. This is a low bush which grows in watered areas of dry, hot sandy regions or rocky terrain of the desert floor, usually below 750 m (2,460 ft) above sea level.

Hummingbirds visit the bush to feed on the nectar. Other birds eat the sugar-rich flower centers. This plant is sometimes cultivated as a landscape ornamental in desert regions for its bright flowers and to attract birds.

The plant is thought to have been eaten by Native Americans of the Southwest.

== Ecology ==
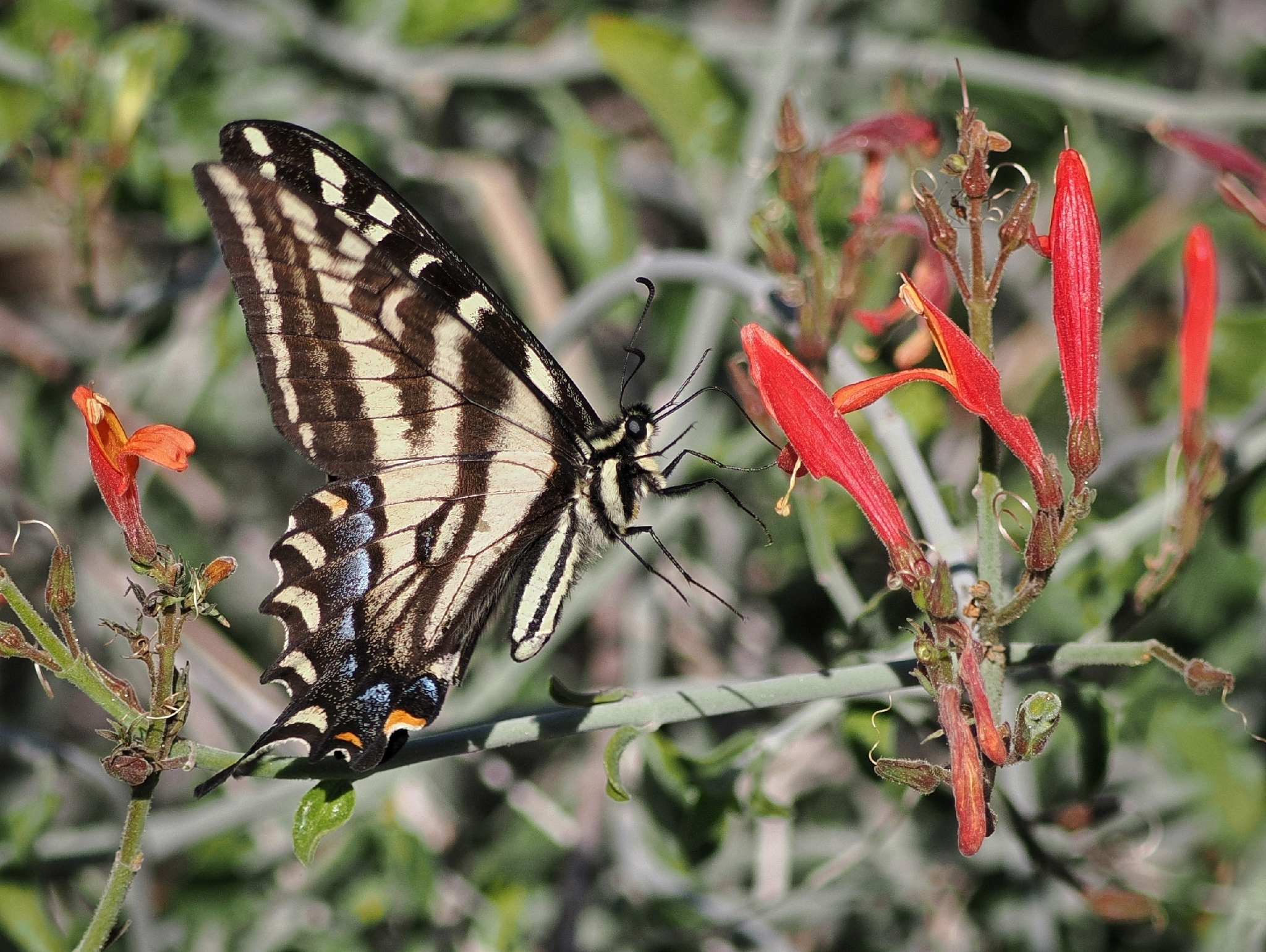
Pale swallowtail feeding from J. californica

Hummingbirds are a crucial pollinator for this plant, as its name implies, and the two have coevolved. By developing a tube-like flower structure and protruding anthers, the flower ensures pollination by coating the hummingbird's head in pollen every time it uses its long, slender beak to drink the nectar at the base of the flower. This plant is also effectively pollinated by bees that use its nectar to make honey.

This species also has several companion plants that benefit from being grown near each other including Ambrosia dumosa, Chilopsis linearis, Larrea tridentata, and Encilia farinosa.

== Uses ==
Justicia californica has been found to have antimicrobial properties and thus has medicinal potential. The plant contains useful phytochemicals, phenolic compounds, and flavonoids throughout the root system, stem, and leaves. Glycosides used to treat heart disease were also present in Justicia californica.

The flower of this plant is also edible and was known to be eaten by the local Native Americans such as the Diegueno tribe and the Spanish. The nectar from the flowers can be consumed by itself or the entire flower can be used in a salad.

== Cultivation ==
Being a desert plant, Justicia californica is relatively low maintenance once it has been established. It will self-propagate in a desert garden in soil that has a sandy or gravelly consistency. It typically prefers soil that drains quickly and has a pH of 6.0-8.0. Since it is drought tolerant, it requires as much sunlight exposure as possible and very little water, only needing a good soak once a month after being established.
