= Dieter Carl Wasshausen =

German-American botanist

Dieter Carl Wasshausen (born 15 April 1938 in Jena, Germany) is an American botanist who specialized in spermatophytes. In 1962 he started working at the Smithsonian Institution as a technician. He studied at the George Washington University, receiving a PhD in 1972. In 1976 he became chairman of the Botany Department, a post he held until 1982.

Wasshausen has described approximately 247 new species in various families, and five new species have been named for him.
