= Endemic flora of Trinidad and Tobago =

59 species of native vascular plants

The endemic flora of Trinidad and Tobago includes a total of 59 species of vascular plants belonging to 34 plant families. This is less than 3% of the total vascular plant flora of Trinidad and Tobago. Thirty-nine of these species are endemic to Trinidad, 12 are Tobagonian endemics, and six are present on both islands.

Island systems tend to be rich centres of endemism as a result of their isolation. The islands of the Greater Antilles have rates of endemism which range from 12 to 50% of their flora. Trinidad and Tobago has a far lower rate of endemism, probably as a result of its geological history. The islands of Trinidad and Tobago lie on the South American continental shelf, and were both connected to the mainland during the Pleistocene. Tobago was separated from the mainland about 13,000 years ago; Trinidad was connected until more recently, and may only have become separated about 1,500 years ago.

The flora of Trinidad and Tobago has been estimated to include about 2,500 vascular plant species. Although historically as many as 222 species were thought to be endemic, a study by Veerle Van den Eynden and colleagues at the University of the West Indies found that only 59 of these species could validly be considered endemic, including eight species which they were unable to positively confirm as either endemic or non-endemic.

== Conservation status of endemic species ==
Trinidad and Tobago is a small (5,126 km^{2}), densely populated country. In addition, most endemic species are known from a relatively small number of localities—only eight of the 59 species are known from 5 or more localities. In addition to this, 22 of these species have not been collected since 1958, and one that was last collected between 1786 and 1791. Using the IUCN Red List criteria, 18 species have been classified as critically endangered, 16 as endangered, 15 as vulnerable, three as near threatened and three as data deficient. Only four endemic plant species were classified as being of least concern.

== Concentrations of endemic species ==
Three areas in Trinidad and Tobago support relatively large numbers of endemic species—ridge-tops in the Northern Range, and savannas in Trinidad, and the Main Ridge in Tobago.

== List of endemic species ==
| Family | Species | Trinidad | Tobago | Conservation status |
|---|---|---|---|---|
| Acanthaceae | Dicliptera aripoensis (Britton) Leonard | X | | CR |
| Acanthaceae | Justicia flaviflora (Turrill) Wassh. | X | | CR |
| Acanthaceae | Justicia tobagensis (Urb.) Wassh. | | X | VU |
| Acanthaceae | Odontonema brevipes Urb. | | X | VU |
| Annonaceae | Duguetia tobagensis (Urb.) R.E.Fr. | | X | VU |
| Apocynaceae | Cynanchum freemani (N.E.Br.) Woodson | X | | EN |
| Apocynaceae | Gonolobus tobagensis Urb. | X | X | NT |
| Araceae | Philodendron simmondsii Mayo | X | | EN |
| Aristolochiaceae | Aristolochia boosii Panter | X | | EN |
| Asteraceae | Mikania broadwayi B.L.Rob. | X | | CR |
| Begoniaceae | Begonia eciliata O.E.Schulz. | X | | CR |
| Begoniaceae | Begonia mariannensis Wassh. & McClellan | X | | VU |
| Bromeliaceae | Aechmea downsiana Pittendr. | X | | CR |
| Bromeliaceae | Werauhia broadwayi (L.B.Sm.) J.R.Grant | X | X | NT |
| Burmanniaceae | Marthella trinitatis (Johow) Urb. | X | | CR |
| Celastraceae | Maytenus monticola Sandwith | X | X | LC |
| Celastraceae | Maytenus reflexa Urb. | X | | DD |
| Clusiaceae | Clusia aripoensis Britton | X | | EN |
| Clusiaceae | Clusia intertexta Britton | X | | CR |
| Clusiaceae | Clusia tocuchensis Britton | X | | EN |
| Cucurbitaceae | Sicana trinitensis Cheesman | X | | EN |
| Cyclanthaceae | Dicranopygium insulare (Gleason) Harling | | X | VU |
| Cyperaceae | Rhynchospora aripoensis Britton | X | | CR |
| Cyperaceae | Rhynchospora ebracteata (Standl.) H.Pfeiff. | | X | VU |
| Cyperaceae | Rhynchospora ierensis C.Adams | X | | EN |
| Cyperaceae | Scleria orchardii C.Adams | X | | CR |
| Eriocaulaceae | Eriocaulon caesium Griseb. | X | | CR |
| Euphorbiaceae | Acalypha grisebachiana (Kuntze) Pax & K.Hoffm. | X | | CR |
| Euphorbiaceae | Croton aripoensis Philcox | X | | CR |
| Euphorbiaceae | Phyllanthus acacioides Urb. | | X | VU |
| Euphorbiaceae | Phyllanthus mimicus G.L.Webster | | X | CR |
| Fabaceae | Macrolobium trinitense Urb. | X | | EN |
| Flacourtiaceae | Xylosma sanctae-annae Sleumer | X | X | EN |
| Gesneriaceae | Besleria seitzii Krug & Urb. | | X | VU |
| Gesneriaceae | Besleria strigillosa Urb. | ? | ? | DD |
| Lauraceae | Ocotea trinidadensis Kosterm. | X | | VU |
| Loranthaceae | Phoradendron hartii Krug & Urb. | X | | EN |
| Marcgraviaceae | Marcgravia elegans Krug & Urb. | X | | EN |
| Myrsinaceae | Cybianthus cruegeri Mez | X | | EN |
| Myrsinaceae | Cybianthus pittieri Agostini | | X | VU |
| Myrtaceae | Eugenia cruegeri Krug & Urb. ex Urb. | X | X | LC |
| Orchidaceae | Cochleanthes trinitatis (Ames) R.E.Schult. & Garay | X | | EN |
| Orchidaceae | Epidendrum fusiforme (Lindl.) Rchb.f. | X | | VU |
| Orchidaceae | Epidendrum hombersleyi Summerh. | X | | VU |
| Orchidaceae | Epidendrum lanceolatum Bradford ex Griseb. | X | | CR |
| Orchidaceae | Maxillaria broadwayi (Cogn.) R.E.Schult. | | X | CR |
| Orchidaceae | Microchilus schultesianus (Garay) Ormerod | X | | EN |
| Poaceae | Neurolepis virgata (Griseb.) Pilg. | X | | CR |
| Podocarpaceae | Podocarpus trinitensis J.Buchholz & N.E.Gray | X | | LC |
| Polygalaceae | Polygala exserta S.F.Blake | X | | CR |
| Polygalaceae | Securidaca lophosoma (S.F.Blake) Cheesman | X | | VU |
| Polygonaceae | Coccoloba nigrescens Lindau | X | | VU |
| Proteaceae | Roupala tobagensis Sleumer | | X | CR |
| Rubiaceae | Psychotria rufidula Standl. | X | | EN |
| Rubiaceae | Rondeletia hispidula (Griseb.) K.Schum. | X | | EN |
| Rubiaceae | Rondeletia rohrii R.O.Williams & Cheesman | ? | ? | DD |
| Urticaceae | Pilea tobagensis Urb. | | X | VU |
| Verbenaceae | Aegiphila obovata Andrews | X | X | NT |
| Xyridaceae | Xyris grisebachii Malme | X | | CR |
