= Main Ridge, Tobago =

Main mountainous ridge on the island of Tobago

Coordinates: 11°16′35″N 60°37′00″W

Main Ridge

Highest point
- Elevation: 572 metres (1,877 ft)
- Prominence: Centre Hill

Geology
- Mountain type: Fault-block mountain
- Rock type: Schist

Main Ridge is the main mountainous ridge on the island of Tobago, Trinidad and Tobago. It is a 29-kilometre (18 mi) chain of hills which runs from southwest to northeast between the Caribbean Sea and the Southern Tobago fault system and reaches a maximum height of 572 m (1,877 ft). The Main Ridge Forest Reserve, which was legally established in 1776, is one of the oldest protected areas in the world. It is a popular site for birdwatching and ecotourism. Main Ridge provides important habitat for native plants and animals, including several species endemic to Tobago.

== History ==
The Treaty of Paris in 1763 ended Tobago's status as a neutral territory and made it a British colony. The Treaty of Aix-la-Chappelle in 1748 had designated Tobago neutral territory and left it in the hands of its remaining indigenous population, but the return to British control led to a rapid conversion of the island to a plantation economy. Under the direction of the Board of Trade, the island was surveyed, divided into 100–500-acre (40–202 ha) plots, and sold to planters. The upper portions of the Main Ridge were reserved as "Woods for the Protection of the Rains" and thus remained uncleared and uncultivated.

The decision to preserve forests to maintain rainfall was driven by the efforts of Soame Jenyns, a commissioner of the Board of Trade and Member of Parliament. Jenyns was convinced of the importance of forests for preserving rainfall through the work of Stephen Hales on plant physiology and transpiration. It took Jenyns eleven years to convince the British Parliament of the importance of the endeavour, but on the 30th April 1776, Parliament passed an ordinance establishing the reserve "for the purpose of attracting frequent showers of rain upon which the fertility of lands in these climates doth entirely depend". https://250mainridge.titl.tt/ This action produced one of the oldest protected areas in the world geared towards conservation and has been described as "the first act in the modern environmental movement".

Beginning in 1904, the rain reserve was combined with adjacent Crown lands and proclaimed the Main Ridge Forest Reserve.

== Geography ==
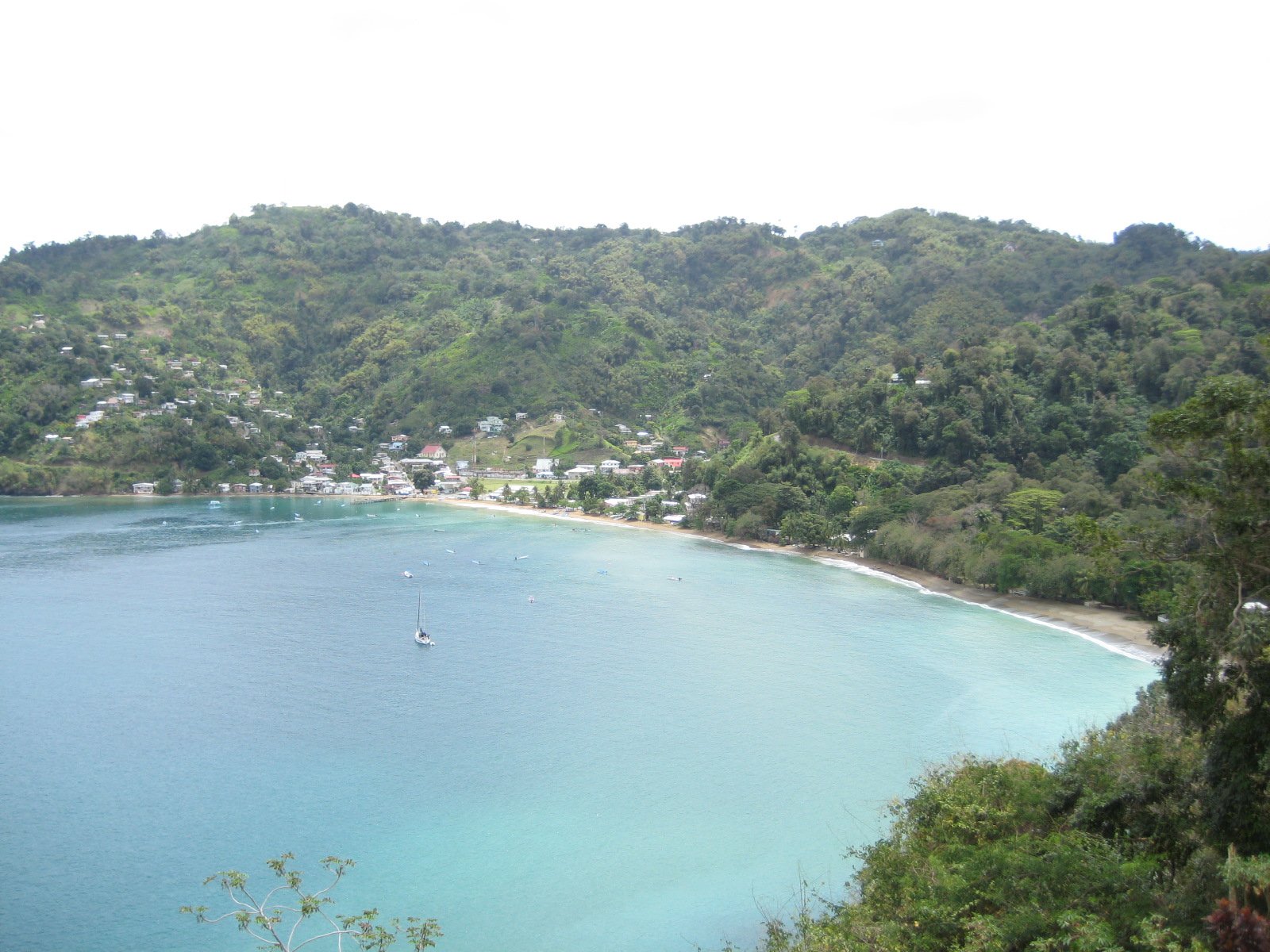
The hills of the Main Ridge meet the sea along Tobago's north coast.

Main Ridge forms the mountainous backbone of the island of Tobago, which is the smaller and more northern of the two main islands that make up the southern Caribbean nation of Trinidad and Tobago. The chain of hills is 29 km (18 mi) long and runs from the southwest to the northeast, roughly parallel to the orientation of the island. Main Ridge reaches an elevation of 572 metres (1,877 ft) above sea level at Centre Hill, but lacks any well-defined peaks. To the northwest it is bounded by the Caribbean Sea and by the Southern Tobago fault system to the southeast.

Rainfall averages about 2,800 millimetres (110 in) per year. Most streams run along oblique-slip faults with a northwest orientation. Major streams draining the Main Ridge include the Coffee, Hillsborough, Goldsborough, and Queens Rivers. Streams which drain to the northwest are short and steep, while those which drain to the southeast are longer, with better-developed courses. Waterfalls, including the Argylle Waterfall (Tobago's highest) occur at major transitions between rock types. The northeastern slopes are steeper than the southwestern ones and are among the most landslide-prone parts of the island.

=== Geology ===
Main Ridge is primarily underlain by the North Coast Schist Group (NCSG), which occupies the northern third of the island of Tobago. The island of Tobago is the main exposed portion of the Tobago terrane, a fragment of crustal material lying between the Caribbean and South American Plates. The rocks of the NCSG are metavolcanic; the underlying igneous rock was laid down during the Late Jurassic or Early Cretaceous. They underwent metamorphosis prior to the mid Cretaceous, when additional volcanic intrusion formed the rocks of the Tobago Volcanic Group. A combination of uplift, erosion, and faulting during the late Mesozoic and Paleogene led to the elevated horst block separated from the half graben of the southern lowlands by the Southern Tobago fault system.

=== Flora and fauna ===
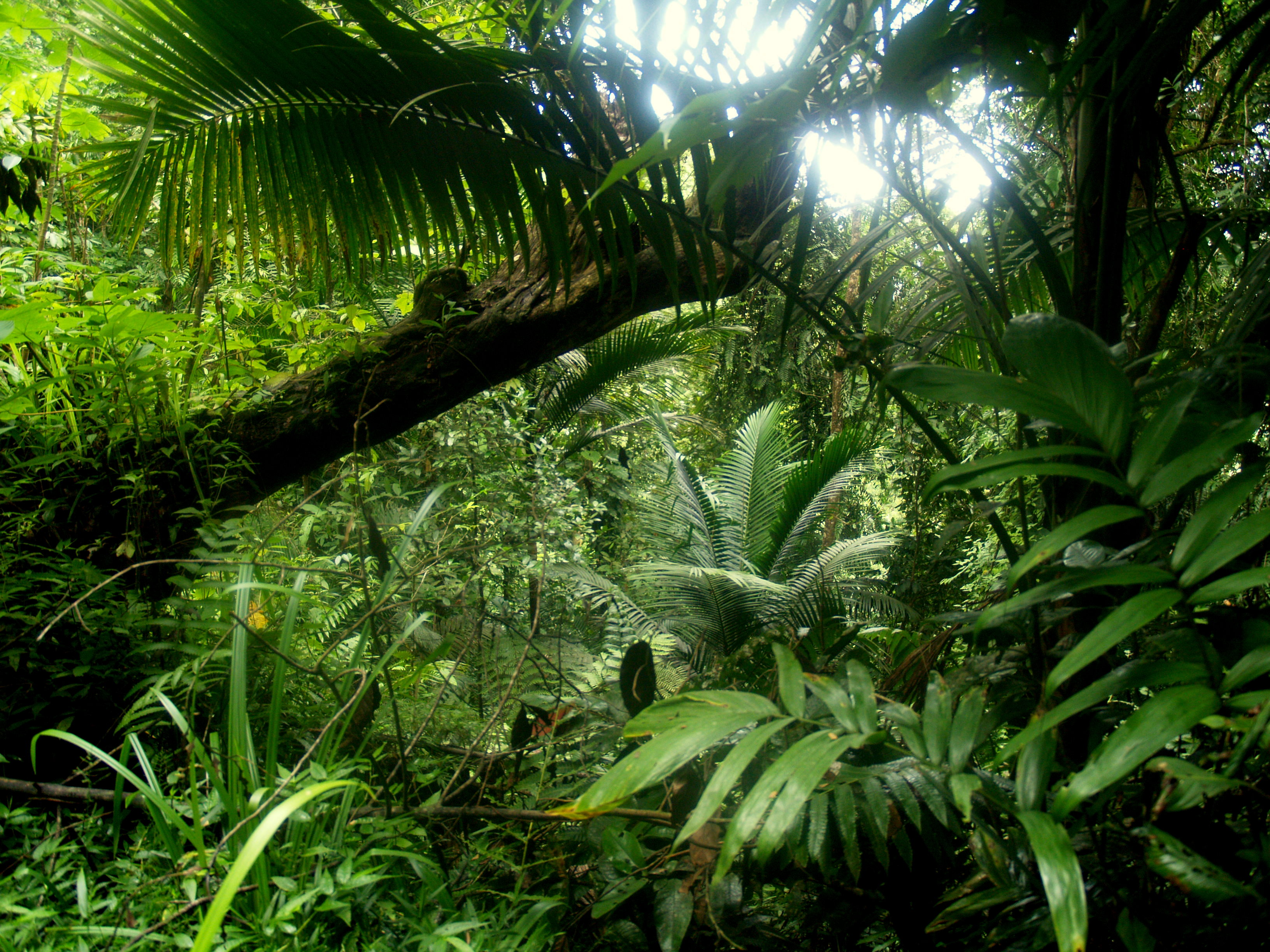
Forest vegetation along Main Ridge.

Main Ridge is dominated by lower montane rain forest (according to John Stanley Beard's classification of the vegetation of Tobago).

In Tobago, these forests are characterised by an emergent canopy of Licania biglandulosa and Byrsonima spicata, with the palm Euterpe broadwayi more common on exposed ridges and summits. Moist lowland forest dominates the lower-lying portions of the Main Ridge. The forests experienced limited human disturbance prior to the 1940s, but were badly damaged by Hurricane Flora in 1963. Plant species endemic to Tobago which have been recorded from Main Ridge include Odontonema brevipes, Duguetia tobagensis, Phyllanthus acacioides, Besleria seitzii, Cybianthus pittieri, Pilea tobagensis, and Justicia tobagensis.

Some 210 species of birds, 24 snakes and 16 lizards have been recorded from the area. Sixteen mammalian species, including the nine-banded armadillo, crab-eating raccoon and red-rumped agouti are present. The ichthyofauna is limited - only four of Tobago's 13 freshwater fish species are found in its rivers and streams. The spotted algae-eating goby, Sicydium punctatum, is the most widespread fish species in the area, while the jumping guabine, Anablepsoides hartii, is found at the highest elevations and is the only fish species upstream of several waterfalls.

Aquatic invertebrates include the decapods Atya innocous, Eudaniela garmani, Macrobrachium faustinum, and the introduced red-rimmed melania.

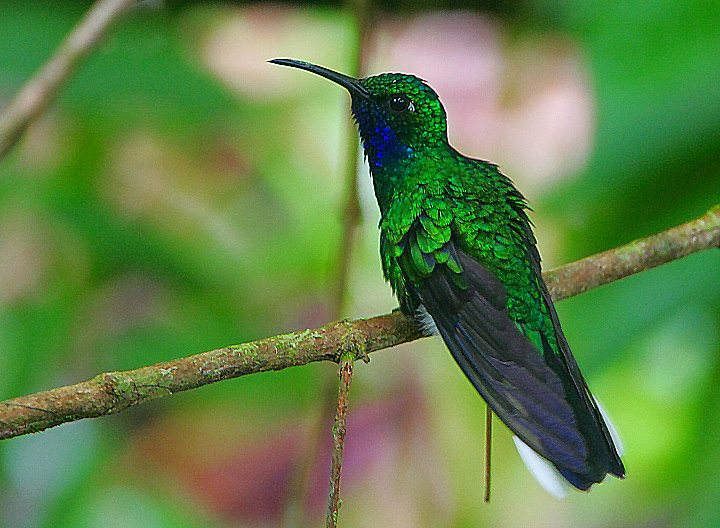
White-tailed sabrewing at Gilpin Trace, Main Ridge

Main Ridge provides critical habitat for three endemic amphibians: Turpin's frog, the Bloody Bay poison frog and the Charlotteville rain frog, which are endemic to north-eastern Tobago, and for the Tobago stream snake.

The site has been designated an Important Bird Area (IBA) by BirdLife International because it supports significant populations of rufous-vented chachalacas, white-tailed sabrewings, copper-rumped hummingbirds and Venezuelan flycatchers. It is one of seven IBAs in Trinidad and Tobago. The white-tailed sabrewing is endemic to north-eastern Venezuela and the Main Ridge; after Hurricane Flora in 1963 the hummingbird was thought to have been extirpated from Tobago, but was rediscovered in 1974.

== Conservation ==
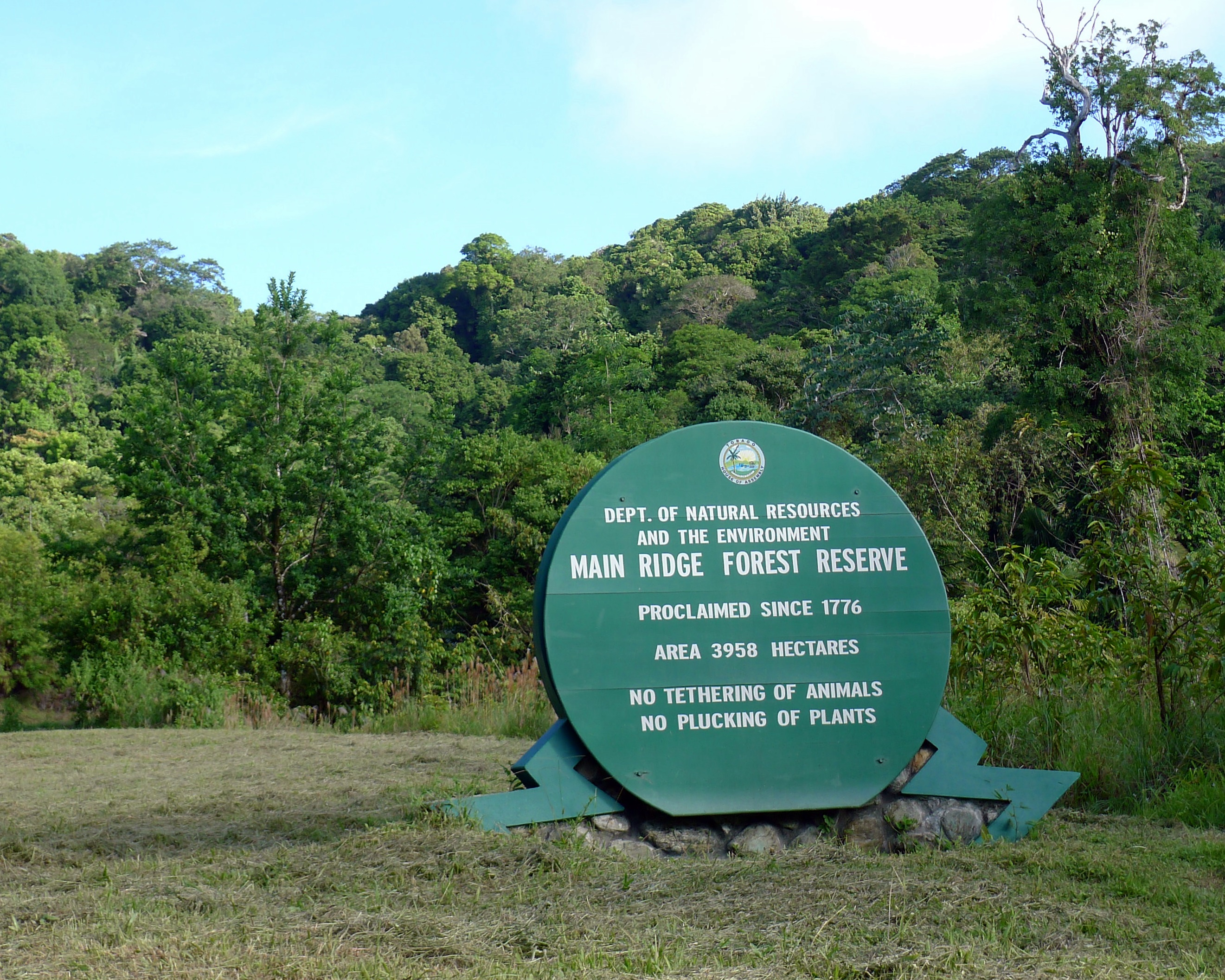
Reserve entrance

The Main Ridge Forest Reserve, a 3,937-hectare (9,730-acre) forest reserve, is one of the oldest protected areas in the world. The Trinidad and Tobago government submitted the Main Ridge Forest Reserve as a tentative listing for a UNESCO World Heritage Site in 2011. The area is managed by the Department of Natural Resources and the Environment, a department of the Tobago House of Assembly.

The Main Ridge Forest Reserve plays an important role in the protection of native biodiversity, particularly endemic plant species. The Main Ridge and the Northern Range (in northern Trinidad) are the areas in the country which support the largest numbers of globally rare plant species. A gap analysis of endemic vascular plants of Trinidad and Tobago identified 15 endemic plant species in the area; species distribution modelling suggested that the reserve included suitable habitat for another nine endemic plant species.

=== Ecotourism ===
Main Ridge is an important ecotourism destination and birdwatching site. The site has a visitor centre and a network of nine trails which allow access to the site. Additional trails were constructed to reduce pressure on the most popular trail, Gilpin Trace, which is prone to over-use. The Main Ridge Forest Reserve was named the World's Leading Ecotourism Destination by the World Travel Awards from 2003 to 2006 and the World's Leading Green Destination in 2007 and 2009.

=== Threats ===
Forests on the Main Ridge were damaged by Hurricane Flora in 1963, and its forests continue to be susceptible to hurricane damage. Given the small size of the area, fires started in surrounding agricultural lands can penetrate deep into the hills. Commercial and subsistence hunting and overuse for tourism pose threats to biodiversity, while the chytrid fungus Batrachochytrium dendrobatidis poses a threat to endemic amphibians.
