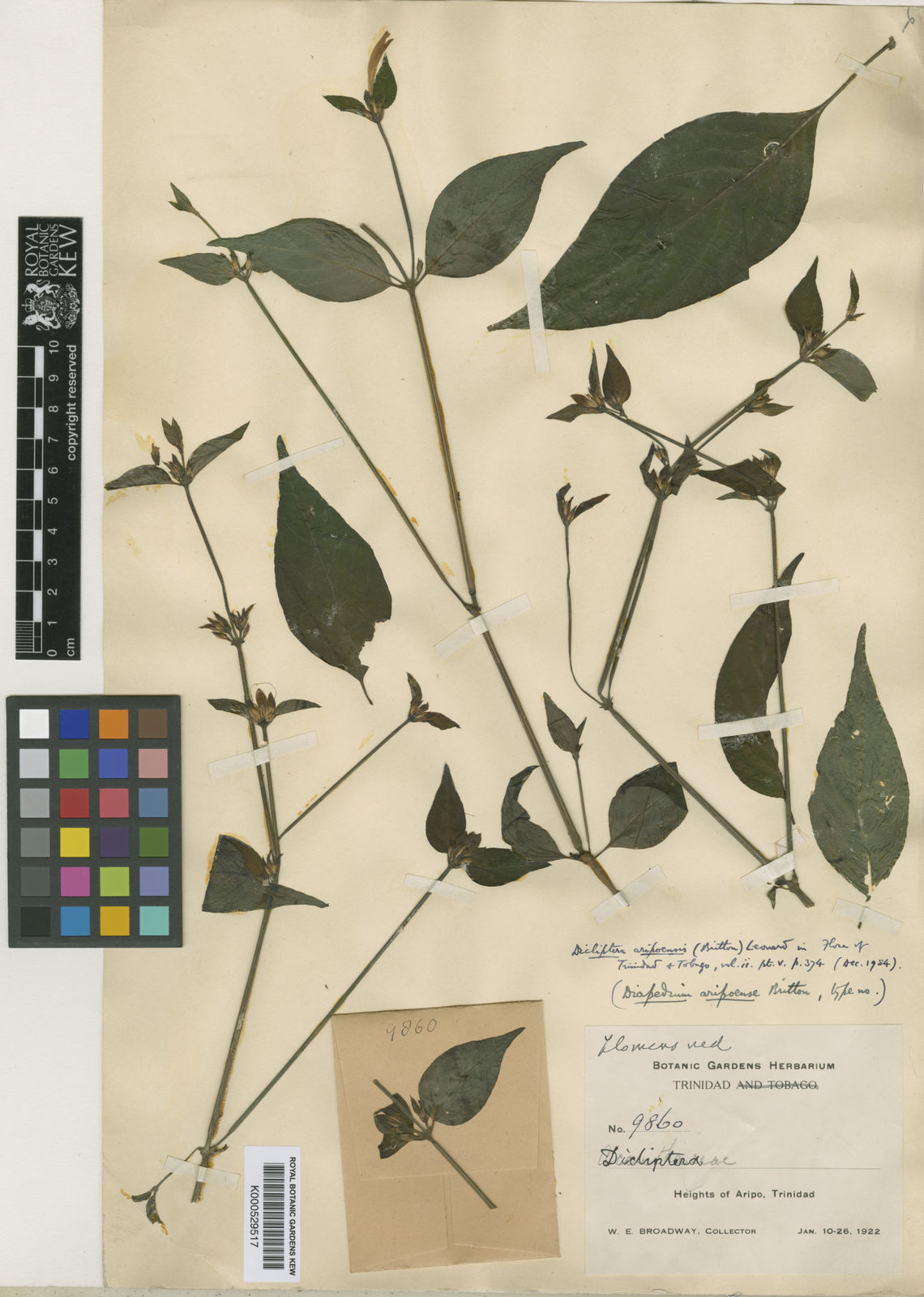

Conservation status
- Endangered (IUCN 3.1)

Scientific classification
- Kingdom: Plantae
- Clade: Tracheophytes
- Clade: Angiosperms
- Clade: Eudicots
- Clade: Asterids
- Order: Lamiales
- Family: Acanthaceae
- Genus: Dicliptera
- Species: D. aripoensis

Binomial name
- Dicliptera aripoensis (Britton) Leonard

Synonyms
- Diapedium aripoense Britton

= Dicliptera aripoensis =

Species of flowering plant

Dicliptera aripoensis is a species of plant in the family Acanthaceae which is endemic to Trinidad and Tobago. The species is only known from the Heights of Aripo, in Trinidad's Northern Range. It is a branching shrub, 1–1.5 m tall with red flowers about 3 cm long.

The species was described as Diapedium aripoense by American botanist Nathaniel Lord Britton in 1926, based on a collection made by Walter Elias Broadway in 1922. American botanist Emery Clarence Leonard transferred the species to the genus Dicliptera in 1954.

== Conservation status ==
Although Dicliptera aripoensis is not listed in the IUCN Red List the authors of a 2008 assessment of the endemic plant species of Trinidad and Tobago considered it a critically endangered because it is known from only a single locality, and this area is shrinking or experiencing habitat degradation.

== See also ==
- Endemic flora of Trinidad and Tobago
