= Bloody Bay =

Bloody Bay may refer to:

- Battle of Bloody Bay, a naval battle
- Bloody Bay, Newfoundland and Labrador, Canada
- Bloody Bay Poison Frog, a species of frog in the family Dendrobatidae
- A village and a bay in the island of Tobago by this name. A legend states that a naval battle took place in 1666.
