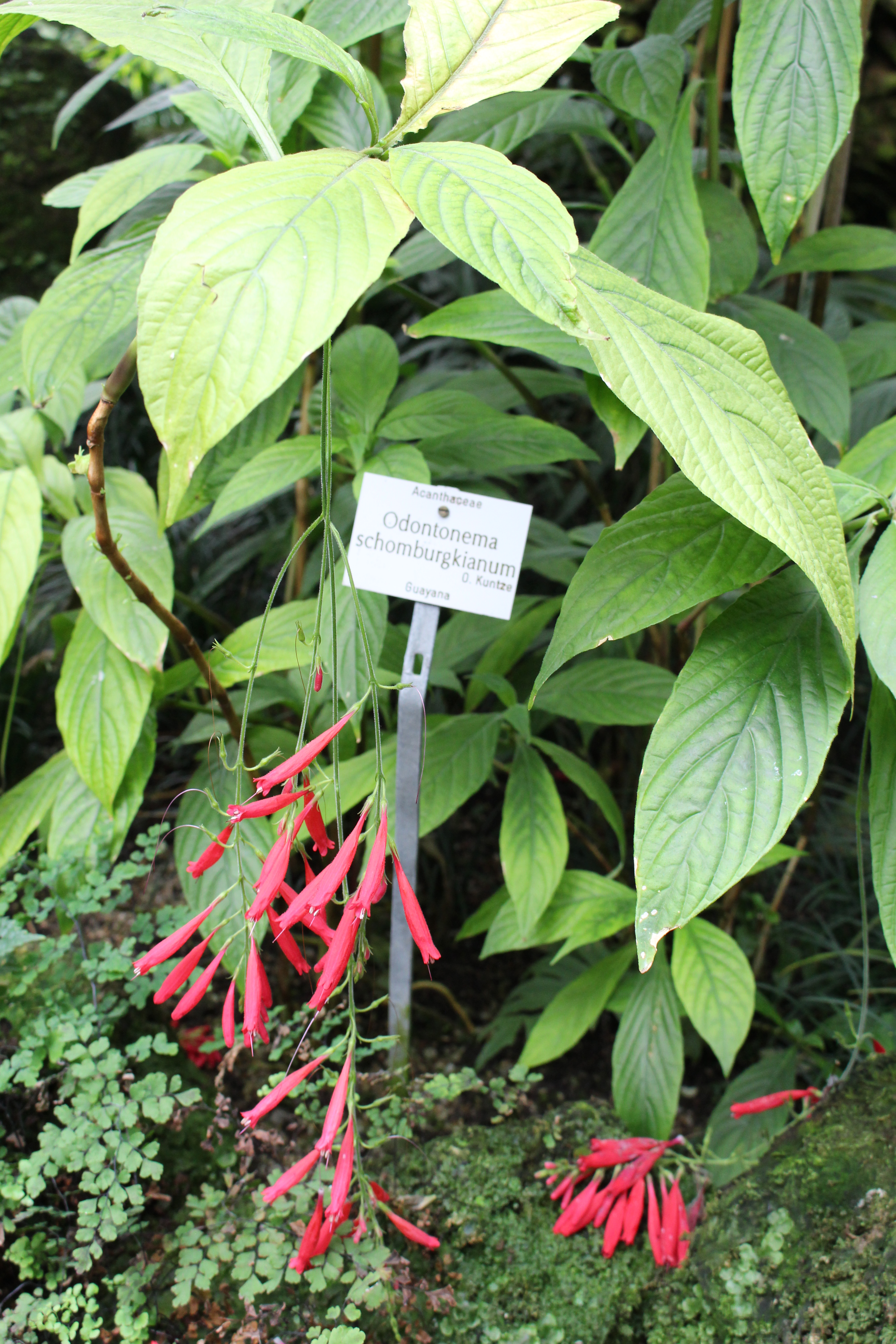
- At the Botanical Garden Munich-Nymphenburg
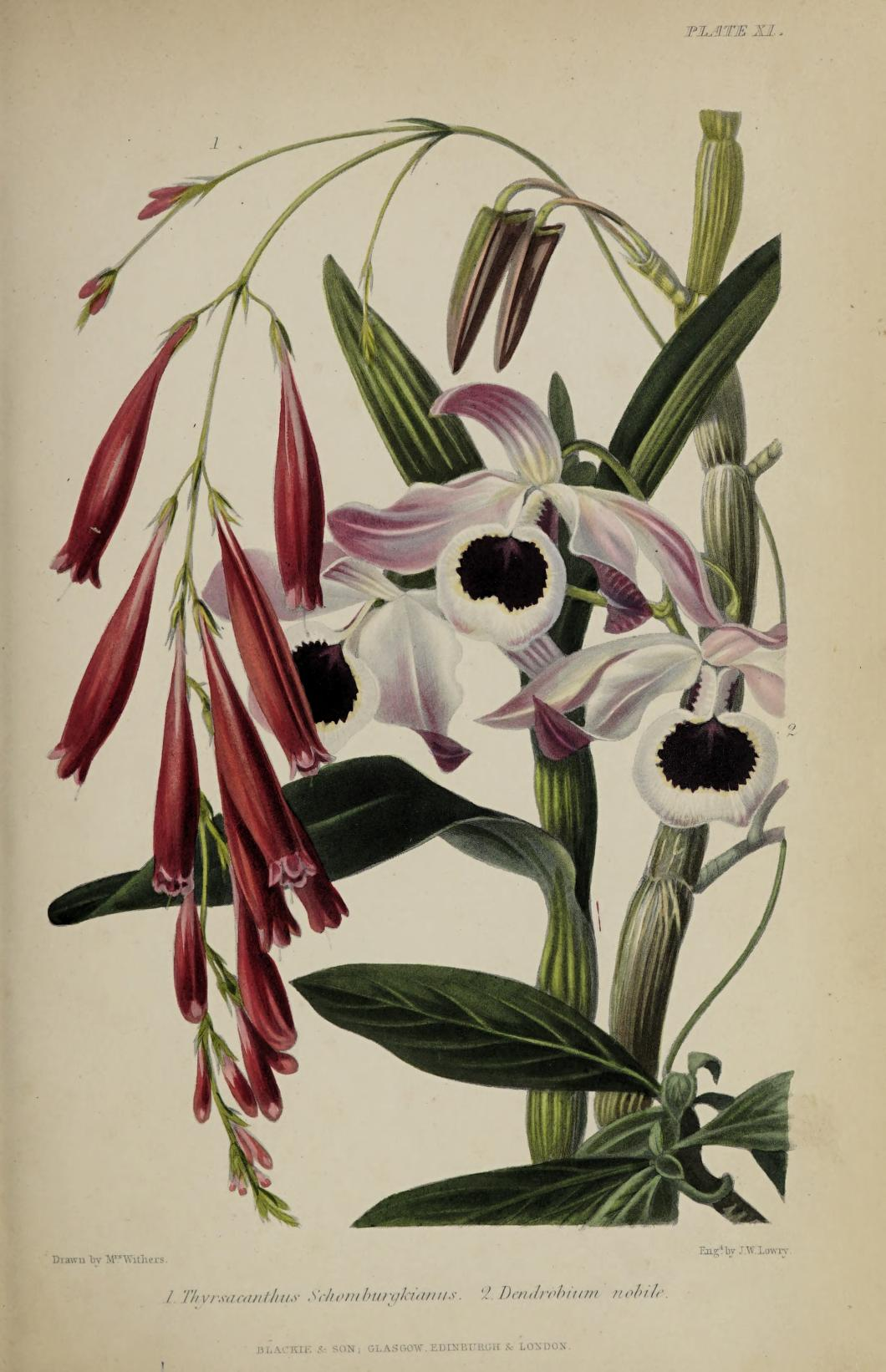
- Botanical illustration with Dendrobium nobile

Scientific classification
- Kingdom: Plantae
- Clade: Tracheophytes
- Clade: Angiosperms
- Clade: Eudicots
- Clade: Asterids
- Order: Lamiales
- Family: Acanthaceae
- Genus: Odontonema
- Species: O. schomburgkianum

Binomial name
- Odontonema schomburgkianum (Nees) Kuntze

Synonyms
- Odontonema macrophyllum Gleason; Thyrsacanthus schomburgkianus Nees

= Odontonema schomburgkianum =

Species of plant

Odontonema schomburgkianum, Schomburgk's fountain plant, is a species of flowering plant in the family Acanthaceae. It is native to Guyana. A perennial shrub with red flowers borne on pendant racemes, it is occasionally available from specialty greenhouses.
