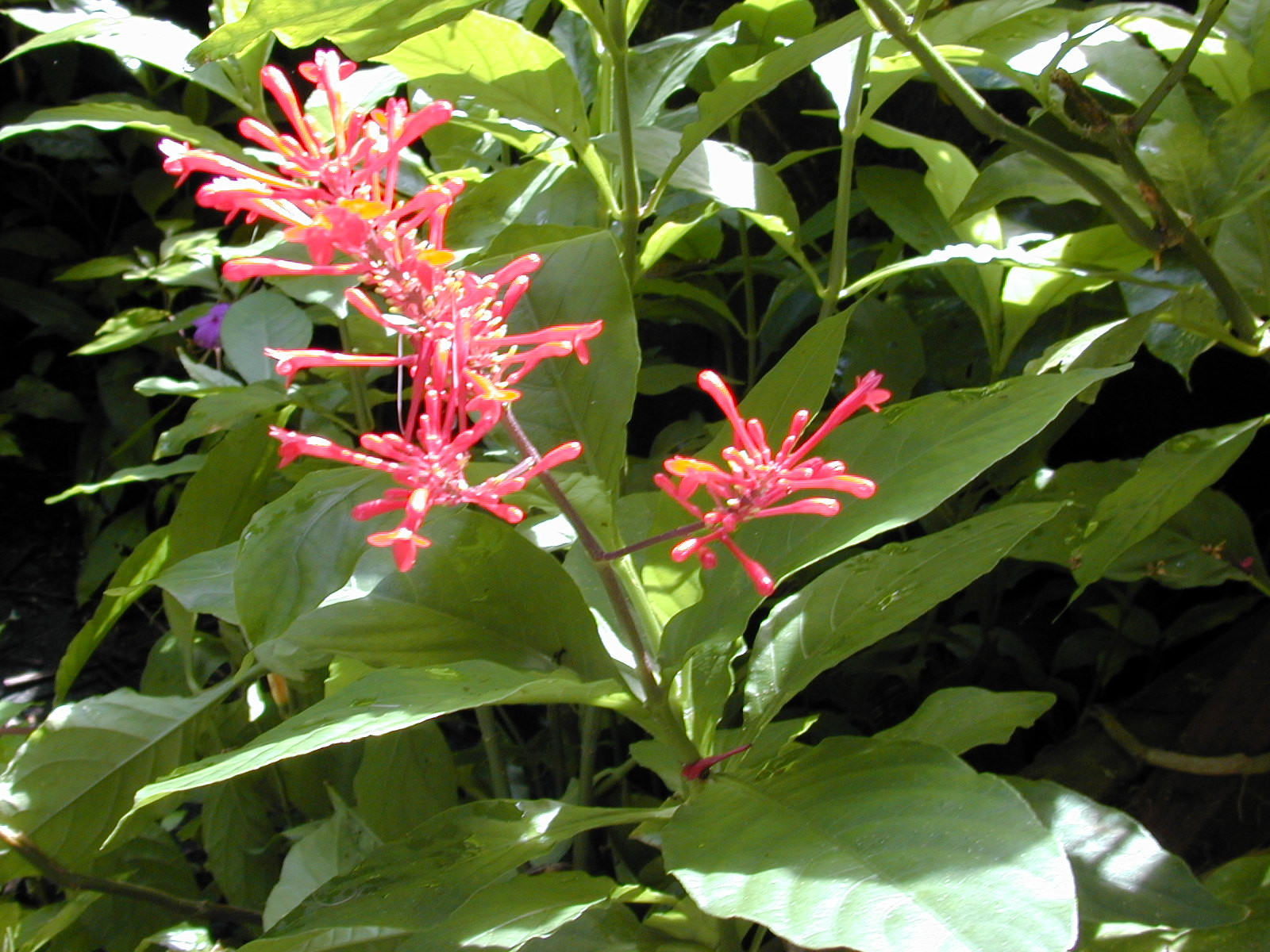

Scientific classification
- Kingdom: Plantae
- Clade: Embryophytes
- Clade: Tracheophytes
- Clade: Angiosperms
- Clade: Eudicots
- Clade: Asterids
- Order: Lamiales
- Family: Acanthaceae
- Genus: Odontonema
- Species: O. strictum

Binomial name
- Odontonema strictum Kuntze

= Odontonema strictum =

Species of flowering plant

Odontonema strictum is a species of plant in the family Acanthaceae which is endemic to South America. The plant grows to a height of two metres or half that if it grown in a container. The waxy flowers grow in twelve inch spikes and in their native country they attract hummingbirds and butterflies when they bloom in the autumn.

Position : Plant them where they receive bright light to ensure it flowers well. Preferably no harsh afternoon sun. They tolerate shade for half of the day but rather no more.

Pests : not a garden plant prone to many pests, thus low maintenance in that regard.

Propagation : Roots easily from semi-soft cuttings. Tip the growing tips a few times to promote a compact plant before you allow it to mature.

Growth habit : Multi-branched plant, straight from the ground. Produces long slender branches if exposed to too little sun. Prune the plant back when the growth is too tall, causing it to fall open. Moderately fast growing.

Watering requirements : Moderate watering
