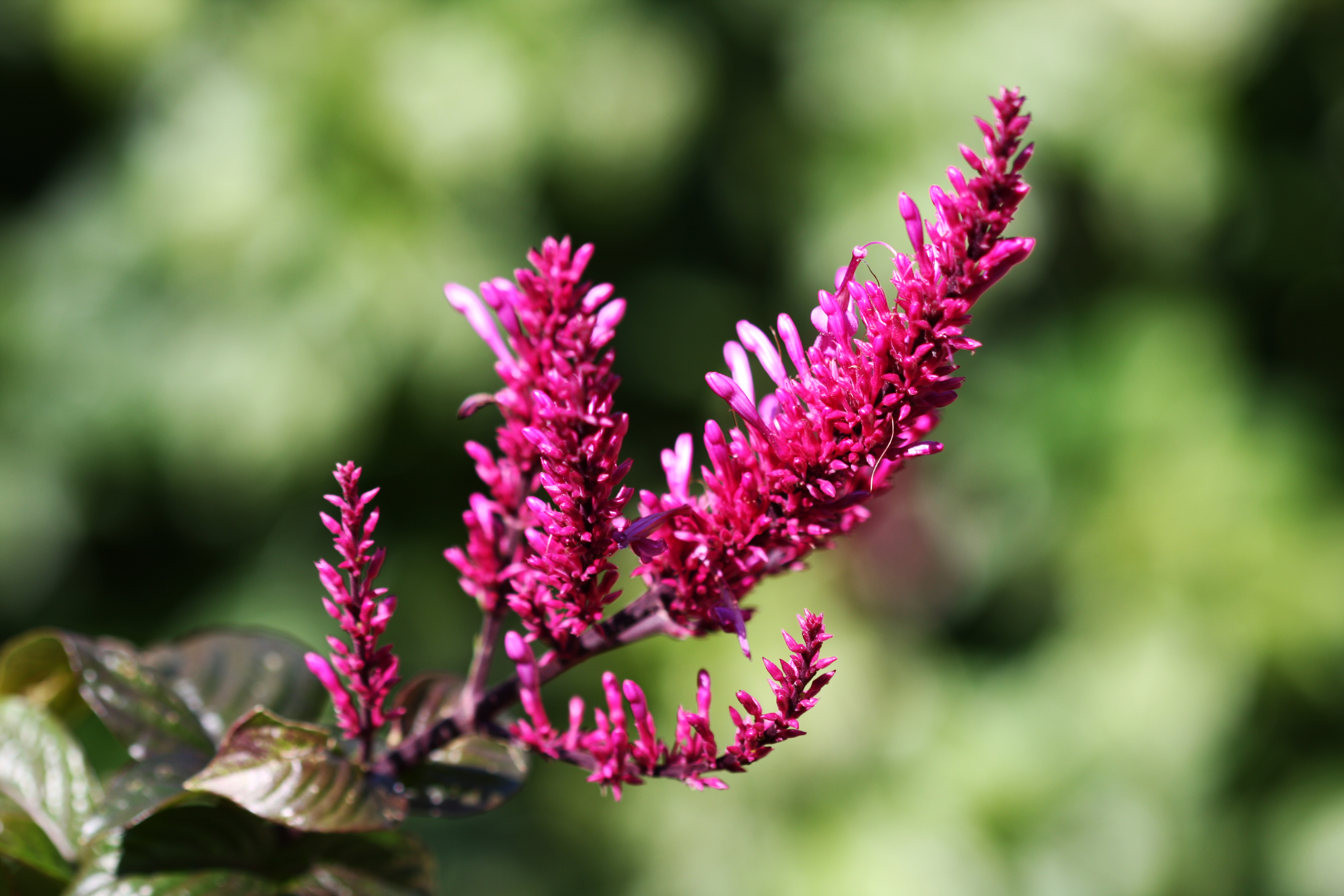
- Inflorescence
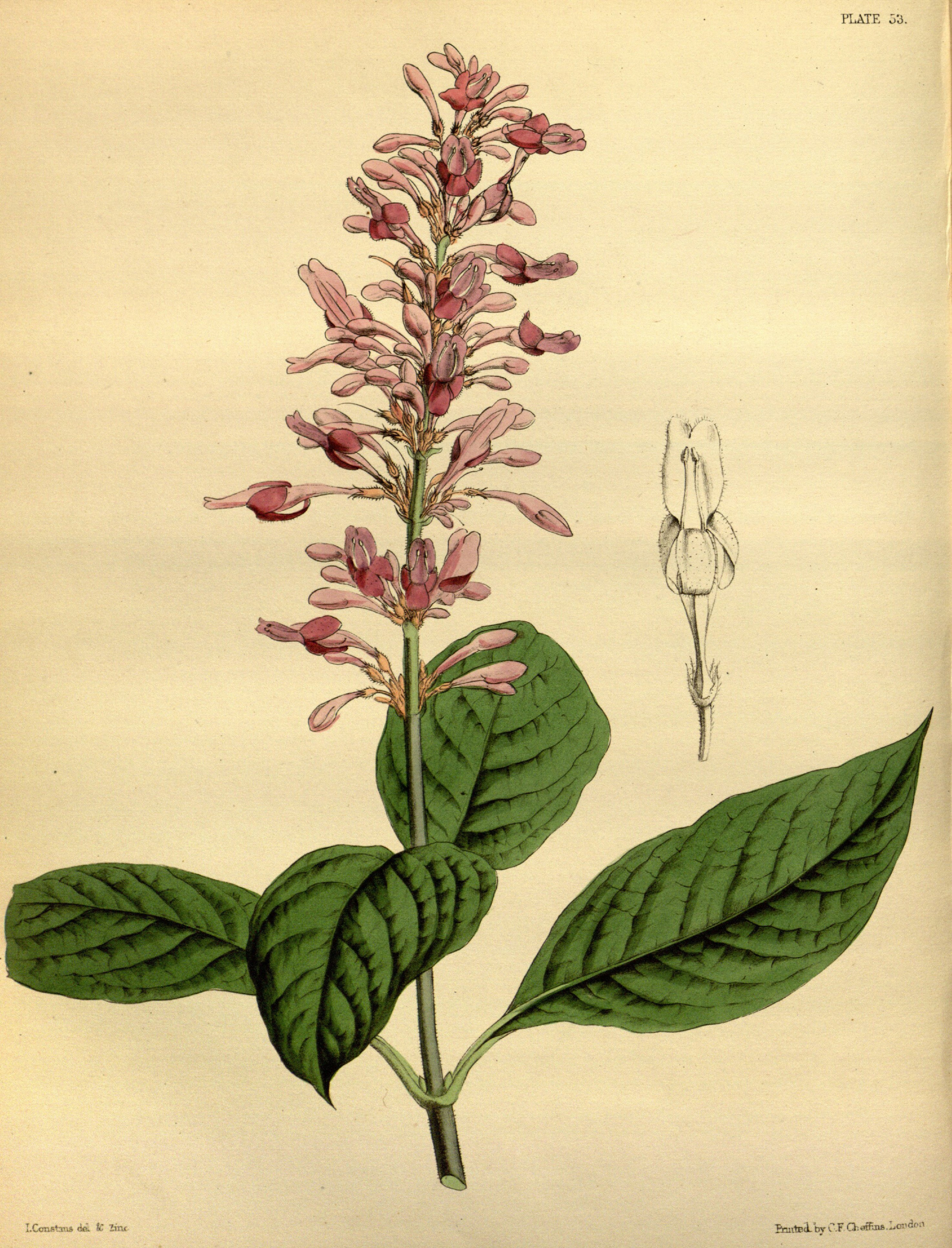
- Botanical illustration

Scientific classification
- Kingdom: Plantae
- Clade: Tracheophytes
- Clade: Angiosperms
- Clade: Eudicots
- Clade: Asterids
- Order: Lamiales
- Family: Acanthaceae
- Genus: Odontonema
- Species: O. callistachyum

Binomial name
- Odontonema callistachyum (Schltdl. & Cham.) Kuntze

Synonyms
- List: Aphelandra longiracemosa Lindl.; Justicia callistachya Schltdl. & Cham.; Odontonema breedlovei V.M.Baum; Odontonema geminatum (Donn.Sm.) S.F.Blake; Odontonema lilacinum Kuntze; Thyrsacanthus callistachyus (Schltdl. & Cham.) Nees; Thyrsacanthus callistachyus var. amplus Nees; Thyrsacanthus geminatus Donn.Sm.; Thyrsacanthus lilacinus Lindl.

= Odontonema callistachyum =

Species of plant

Odontonema callistachyum, the purple firespike, is a species of flowering plant in the family Acanthaceae. It is native to Mexico and northern Central America, and has been introduced to Cuba and the Dominican Republic. A perennial shrub, it is typically found in the seasonally dry tropics. It is grown as an outdoor ornamental, and can tolerate shade.

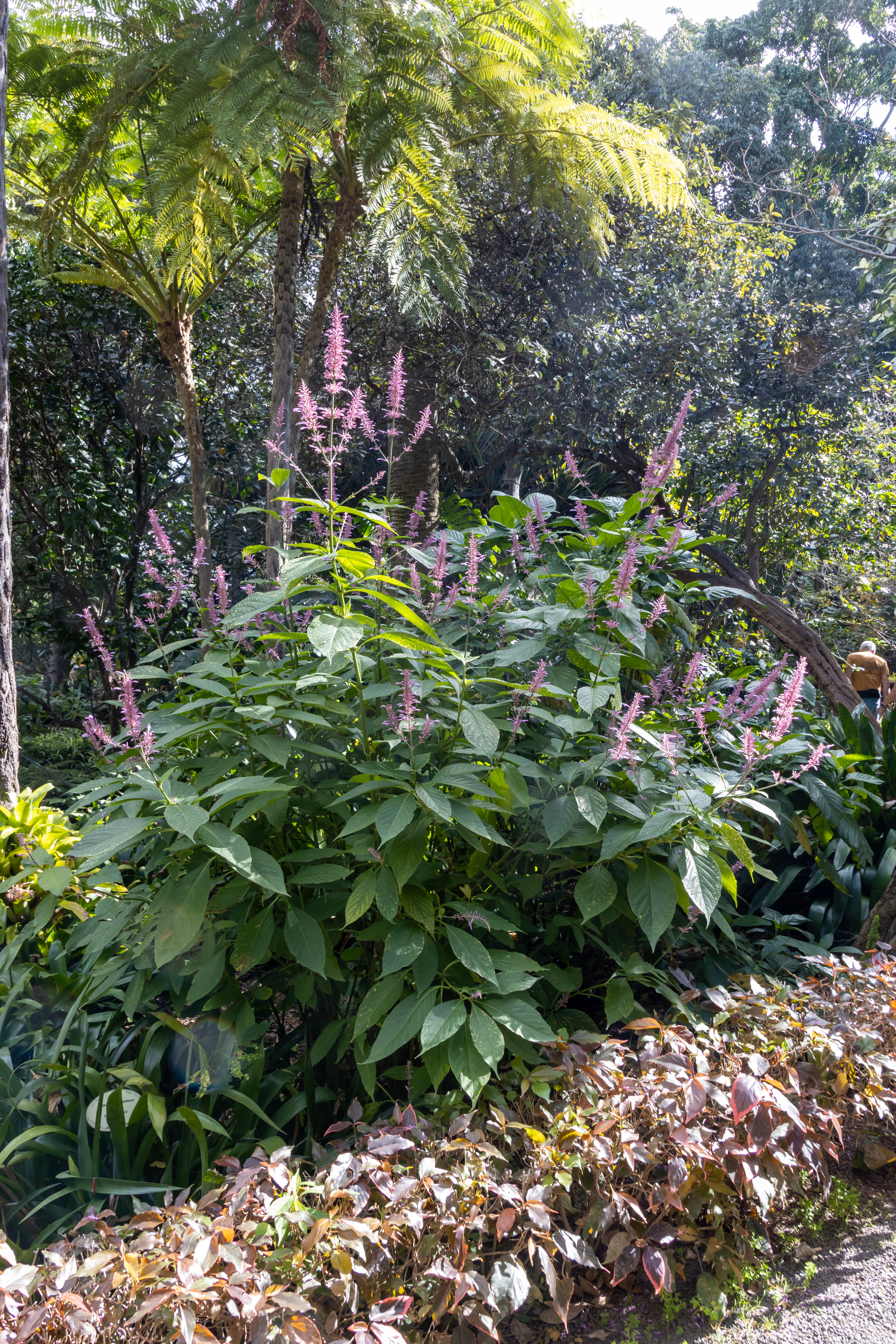
At the Jardín de Aclimatación de La Orotava

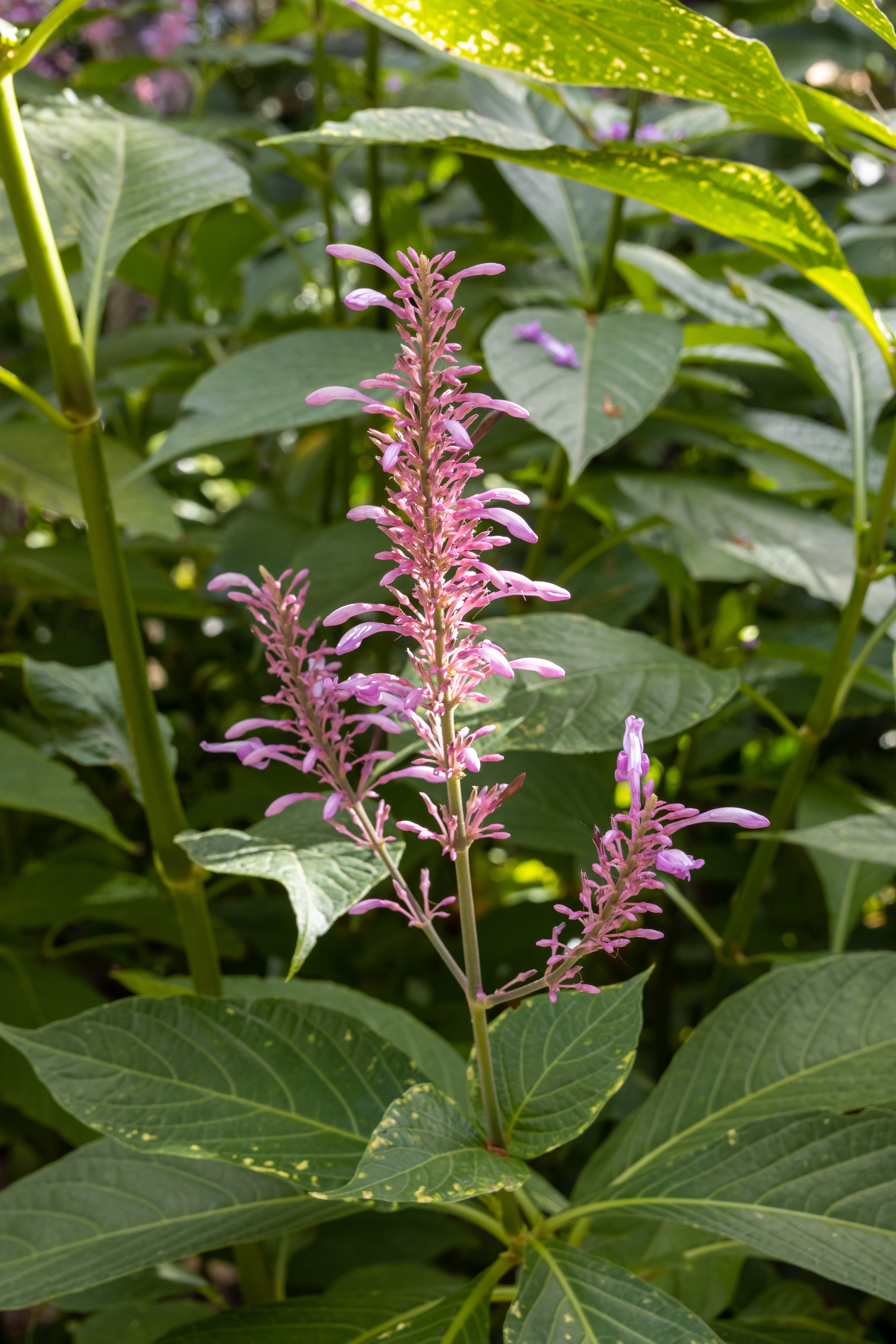
Nearly spent flowers

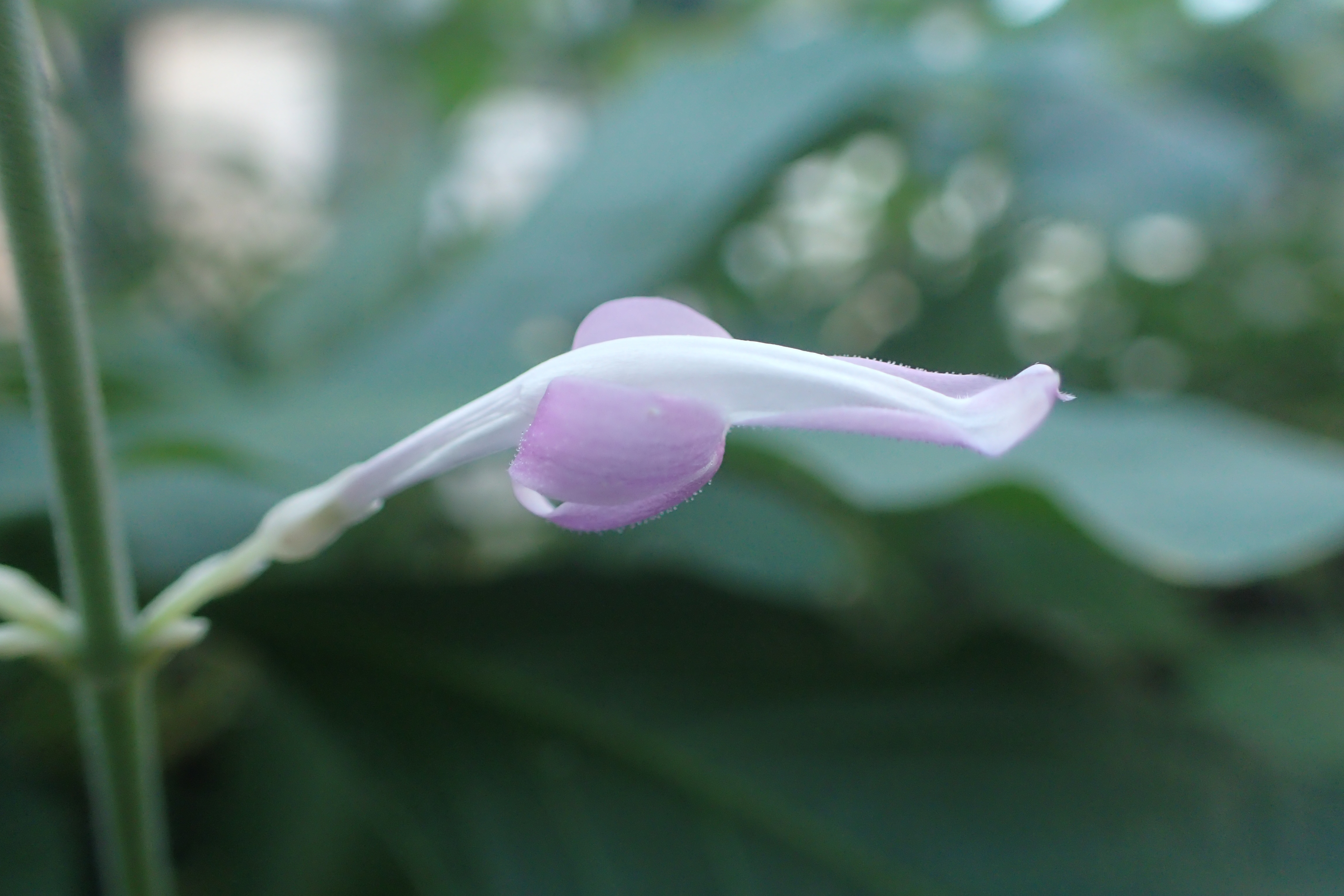
Close-up of flower

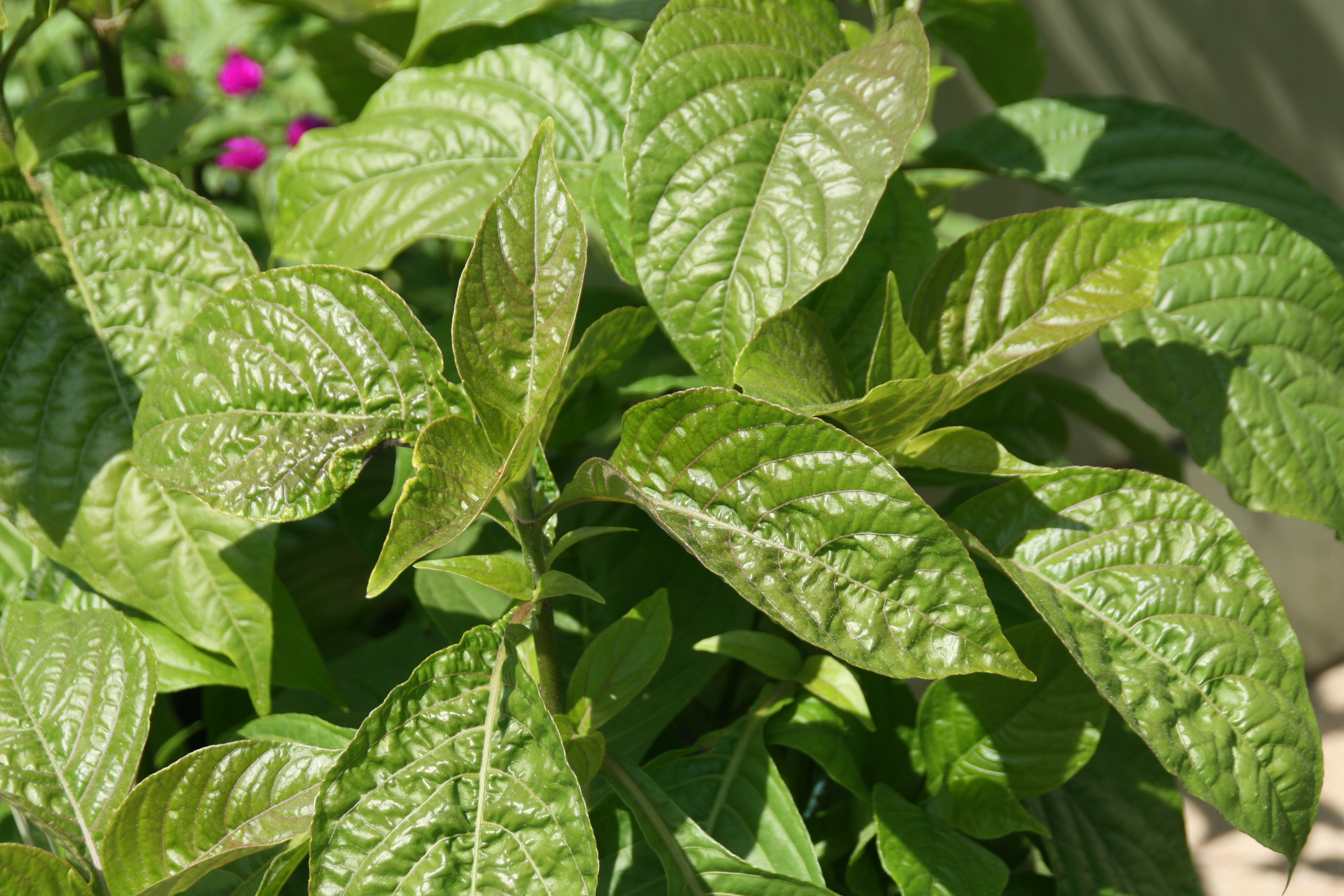
Leaves
