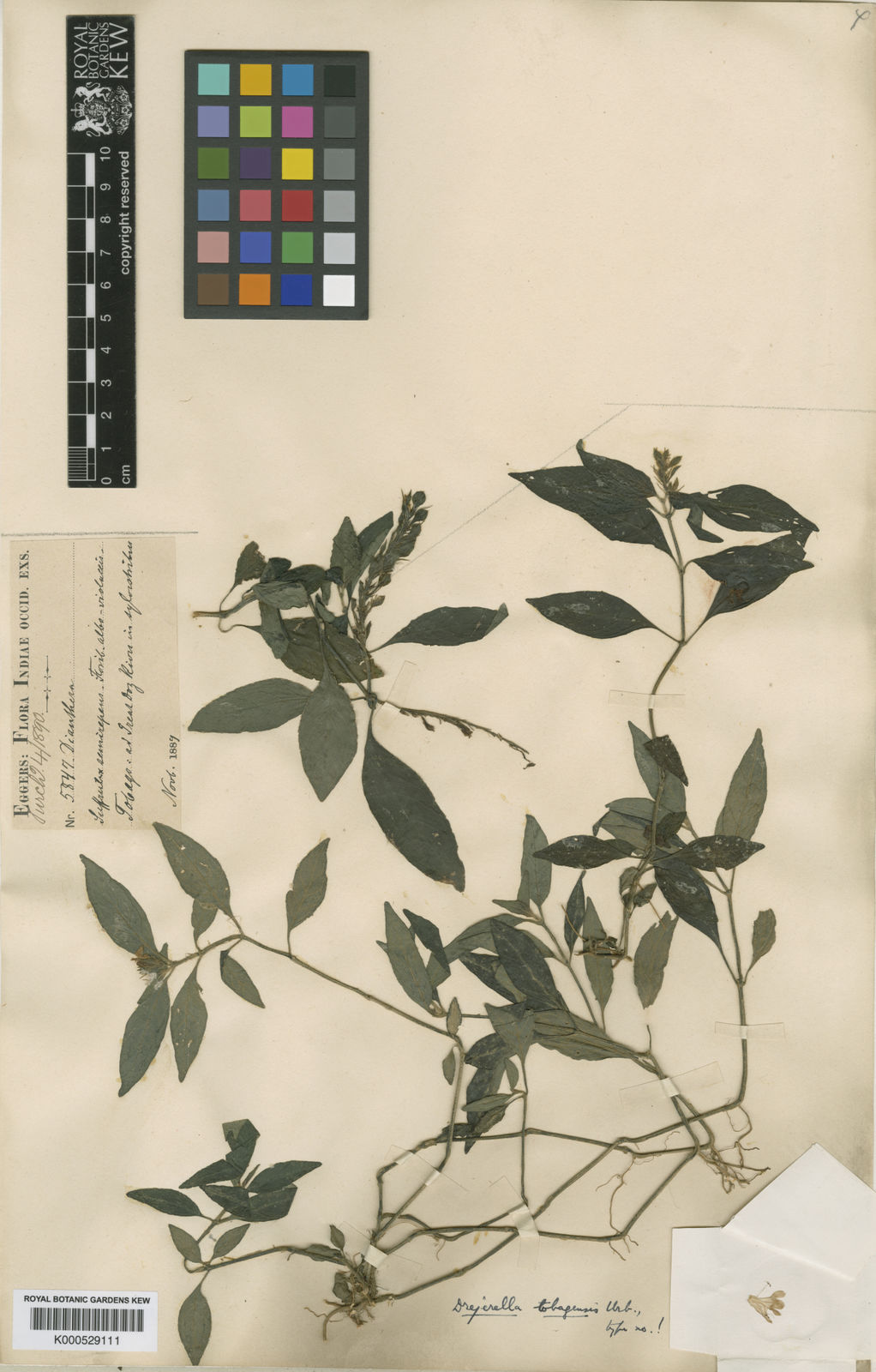

Conservation status
- Vulnerable (IUCN 3.1)

Scientific classification
- Kingdom: Plantae
- Clade: Tracheophytes
- Clade: Angiosperms
- Clade: Eudicots
- Clade: Asterids
- Order: Lamiales
- Family: Acanthaceae
- Genus: Justicia
- Species: J. tobagensis

Binomial name
- Justicia tobagensis (Urb.) Wassh.

Synonyms
- Drejerella tobagensis Turrill

= Justicia tobagensis =

Species of plant

Justicia tobagensis is a species of plant in the family Acanthaceae which is endemic to Trinidad and Tobago. The species is only known from two areas in the Main Ridge of Tobago. It was first described as Drejerella tobagensis by German botanist Ignatz Urban in his Symbolae Antillanae, based on a collection made by Danish botanist Henrik von Eggers.

In 1995 American botanist Dieter C. Wasshausen proposed a new combination, Justicia tobagensis, which reflected the predominant view that the genus Drejerella is actually a part of the genus Justicia.

== Conservation status ==
Although Justicia tobagensis is not listed in the IUCN Red List, the authors of a 2008 assessment of the endemic plant species of Trinidad and Tobago considered it vulnerable due to the fact that it is known from a restricted area or small number of localities.

== See also ==
- Endemic flora of Trinidad and Tobago
