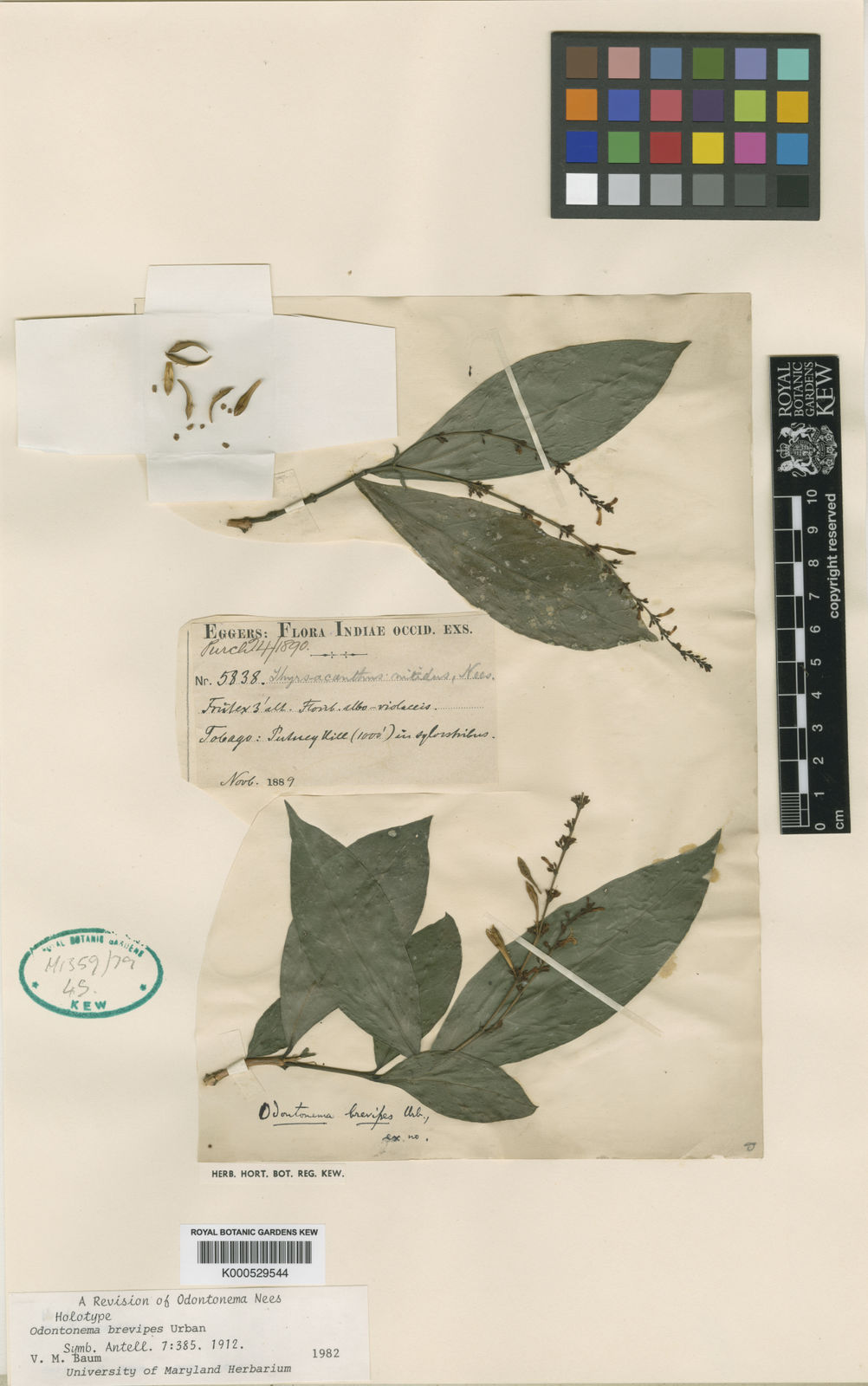

Conservation status
- Vulnerable (IUCN 3.1)

Scientific classification
- Kingdom: Plantae
- Clade: Tracheophytes
- Clade: Angiosperms
- Clade: Eudicots
- Clade: Asterids
- Order: Lamiales
- Family: Acanthaceae
- Genus: Odontonema
- Species: O. brevipes

Binomial name
- Odontonema brevipes Urb.

= Odontonema brevipes =

Species of plant

Odontonema brevipes is a species of plant in the family Acanthaceae which is endemic to Trinidad and Tobago. The species is only known from four localities in the Main Ridge of Tobago. It was described by German botanist Ignatz Urban in his Symbolae Antillanae, based on collections made by Danish botanist Henrik von Eggers and English-born Trinidadian botanist Walter Elias Broadway.

== Conservation status ==
Although Odontonema brevipes is not listed in the IUCN Red List, the authors of a 2008 assessment of the endemic plant species of Trinidad and Tobago considered it vulnerable due to the fact that it is known from a restricted area or small number of localities.

== See also ==
- Endemic flora of Trinidad and Tobago
