= Aristolochia boosii =

Conservation status
- Endangered (IUCN 3.1)

Scientific classification
- Kingdom: Plantae
- Clade: Tracheophytes
- Clade: Angiosperms
- Clade: Magnoliids
- Order: Piperales
- Family: Aristolochiaceae
- Genus: Aristolochia
- Species: A. boosii

Binomial name
- Aristolochia boosii Panter

Species of vine

Aristolochia boosii is a species of woody vine in the Aristolochiaceae plant family which is endemic to Trinidad and Tobago. Known only from a few locations in southern Trinidad, the species was first collected by Julius Boos in 1977. After determining that it was new to science, the species was described by Jacqueline Anne Panter in 1981 and named for its discoverer.

Although Aristolochia boosii is not listed in the IUCN Red List, the authors of a 2008 assessment of the endemic plant species of Trinidad and Tobago considered it endangered because it is only known from three localities, and this area is shrinking or experiencing habitat degradation.

== See also ==
- Endemic flora of Trinidad and Tobago
