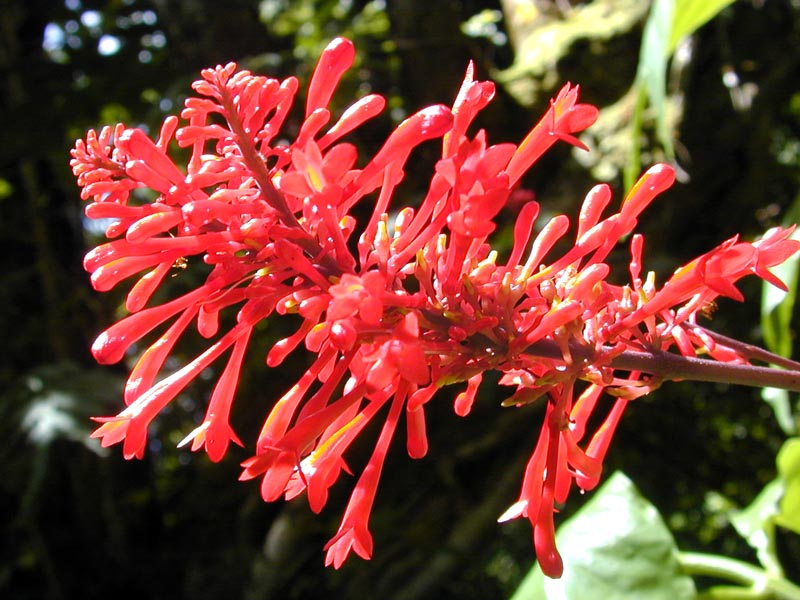

Scientific classification
- Kingdom: Plantae
- Clade: Tracheophytes
- Clade: Angiosperms
- Clade: Eudicots
- Clade: Asterids
- Order: Lamiales
- Family: Acanthaceae
- Genus: Odontonema
- Species: O. cuspidatum

Binomial name
- Odontonema cuspidatum (Nees) Kuntze

= Odontonema cuspidatum =

Species of flowering plant

Odontonema cuspidatum, the mottled toothedthread, the Cardinal's guard, or the firespike, is a species of plant in the family Acanthaceae which is endemic to Mexico, but has been introduced to Florida, Central America, South America, the West Indies, and several Pacific Islands.
