= Plagiosiphon =

Scientific classification
- Kingdom: Plantae
- Clade: Tracheophytes
- Clade: Angiosperms
- Clade: Eudicots
- Clade: Rosids
- Order: Fabales
- Family: Fabaceae
- Subfamily: Detarioideae
- Tribe: Amherstieae
- Genus: Plagiosiphon; Harms (1897)

Synonyms
- Tripetalanthus A.Chev. (1946)

Genus of legumes

Plagiosiphon is a genus of plants in the family Fabaceae. It includes five species of trees or shrubs native to west and west-central Africa. They grow in tropical lowland Guineo-Congolian rain forest, often along rivers, on rocky banks, or on hillsides. Four species are limited to Cameroon, Gabon, and Republic of the Congo in west-central Africa. Plagiosiphon emarginatus also grows in Guinea, Sierra Leone, Liberia, and Côte d'Ivoire in West Africa.

Species accepted by the Plants of the World Online as of September 2023:

- Plagiosiphon discifer Harms
- Plagiosiphon emarginatus (Hutch. & Dalziel) J.Léonard
- Plagiosiphon gabonensis (A.Chev.) J.Léonard
- Plagiosiphon longitubus (Harms) J.Léonard
- Plagiosiphon multijugus (Harms) J.Léonard
