= Plagiosiphon longitubus =

Conservation status
- Critically Endangered (IUCN 2.3)

Scientific classification
- Kingdom: Plantae
- Clade: Tracheophytes
- Clade: Angiosperms
- Clade: Eudicots
- Clade: Rosids
- Order: Fabales
- Family: Fabaceae
- Genus: Plagiosiphon
- Species: P. longitubus

Binomial name
- Plagiosiphon longitubus (Harms) J.Léonard

Species of legume

Plagiosiphon longitubus is a species of plant in the family Fabaceae. It is found in Cameroon. Its natural habitat is subtropical or tropical dry forests. It is threatened by habitat loss.
