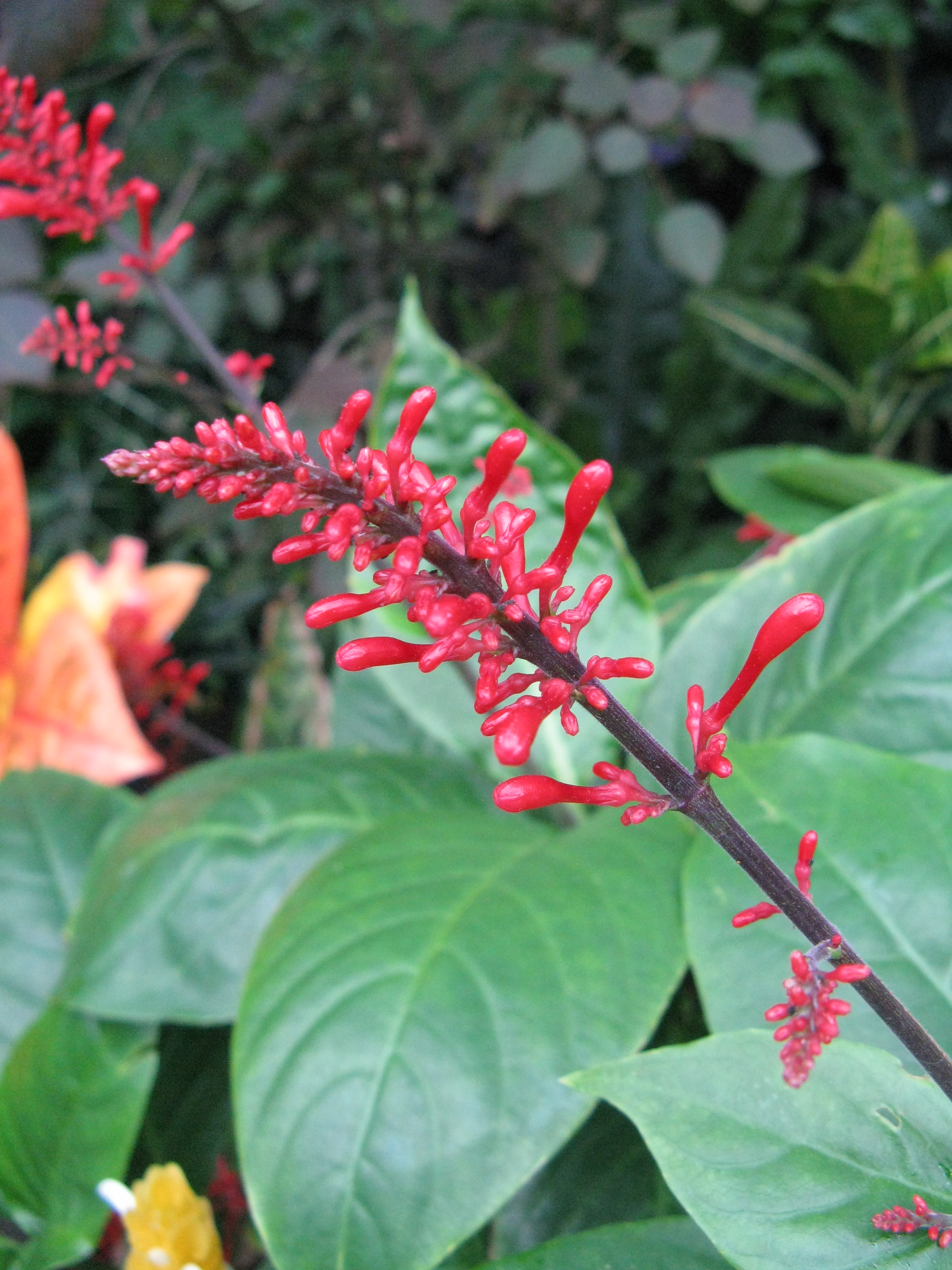
- Odontonema cuspidatum

Scientific classification
- Kingdom: Plantae
- Clade: Tracheophytes
- Clade: Angiosperms
- Clade: Eudicots
- Clade: Asterids
- Order: Lamiales
- Family: Acanthaceae
- Subfamily: Acanthoideae
- Tribe: Justicieae
- Genus: Odontonema; Nees

Synonyms
- Diateinacanthus Lindau; Phidiasia Urb.

= Odontonema =

Genus of flowering plants

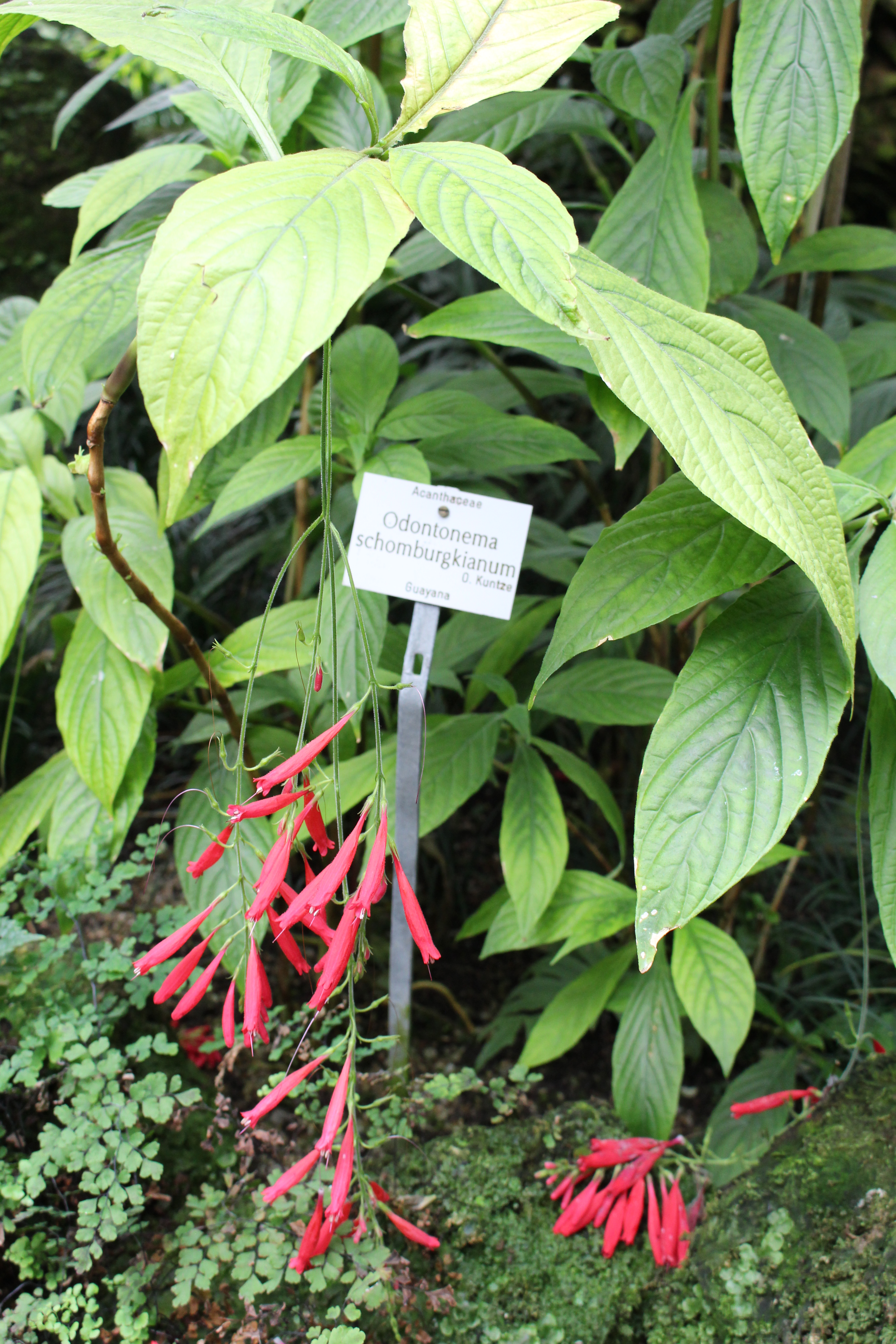
Odontonema schomburgkianum

Odontonema, the toothedthreads or firespikes, is a genus of flowering plants in the family Acanthaceae. It includes 32 species native to the tropical Americas, ranging from Mexico to Peru and southeastern Brazil.

== Species ==
32 species are accepted:

- Odontonema albiflorum Leonard
- Odontonema album V.M.Baum
- Odontonema aliciae T.F.Daniel & J.F.Carrión
- Odontonema ampelocaule Leonard
- Odontonema amplexicaule Nees
- Odontonema auriculatum (Rose) T.F. Daniel
- Odontonema barlerioides (Nees) Kuntze
- Odontonema bracteolatum (Jacq.) Kuntze
- Odontonema brevipes Urb.
- Odontonema callistachyum (Schltdl. & Cham.) Kuntze
- Odontonema corymbulosum (Bertol.) MacVean, Cristof., T.F.Daniel & Baldini
- Odontonema cuspidatum (Nees) Kuntze – Mottled toothedthread
- Odontonema dissitiflorum (Nees) Kuntze
- Odontonema fuchsioides (Nees) Kuntze
- Odontonema glaberrimum (M.E. Jones) V.M.Baum
- Odontonema glabrum Brandegee
- Odontonema guayaquilense Cornejo
- Odontonema hondurense (Lindau) D.N.Gibson
- Odontonema laxum V.M.Baum
- Odontonema liesneri Wassh.
- Odontonema lindavii (Urb.) Acev.-Rodr.
- Odontonema mazarunensis Wassh.
- Odontonema microphyllus Durkee
- Odontonema mortonii V.M. Baum
- Odontonema nitidum (Jacq.) Kuntze – Shrubby toothedthread
- Odontonema peruvianum J.R.I.Wood
- Odontonema rubrum (Vahl) Kuntze
- Odontonema rutilans (Planch.) Kuntze
- Odontonema schomburgkianum Kuntze
- Odontonema sessile (Nees) Kuntze
- Odontonema speciosum V.M. Baum
- Odontonema tubaeforme (Bertol.) Kuntze (syn. Odontonema strictum (Nees) Kuntze) – Firespike
