= Duguetia tobagensis =

Conservation status
- Vulnerable (IUCN 3.1)

Scientific classification
- Kingdom: Plantae
- Clade: Embryophytes
- Clade: Tracheophytes
- Clade: Spermatophytes
- Clade: Angiosperms
- Clade: Magnoliids
- Order: Magnoliales
- Family: Annonaceae
- Genus: Duguetia
- Species: D. tobagensis

Binomial name
- Duguetia tobagensis (Urban) R.E.Fr.

Synonyms
- Alcmene tobagensis Urban

Species of flowering plant

Duguetia tobagensis is a small tree in the plant family Annonaceae which is endemic to Trinidad and Tobago. The species is only known from Tobago.

== Description ==
Dugetia tobagensis is a small tree, the height of which is unknown. The leaves are 6 to 16 centimetres (2.4 to 6.3 in) long and 2.5 to 6.5 centimetres (0.98 to 2.56 in) wide. Flowers are borne among the leaves on inflorescences with 2 to 4 flowers. The petals are cream-coloured, 12–13 millimetres (0.47–0.51 in) long and 4–7 millimetres (0.16–0.28 in) wide. The fruit of the species has never been collected.

== Taxonomy ==
The species was first described as Alcmene tobagensis by German botanist Ignatz Urban in 1921. Urban's description was based on a collection made by Walter Elias Broadway in Tobago in 1912. It was transferred to the genus Duguetia by Robert Elias Fries in 1934.

Duguetia tobagensis is very similar to D. pycnastera. In their 2001 monograph on the genus Duguetia Paul Maas and colleagues expressed doubts as to whether the two plants were actually different species, but preferred to keep the two species separate, at least until collections could be made of the fruit of D. tobagensis.

== Distribution ==
Duguetia tobagensis is known from only four collections, all from Tobago. It was first collected in 1912 by Walter Elias Broadway, a Trinidad-based plant collector and botanist. It was again collected by Broadway in 1914, and then by Kew botanist Noel Yvri Sandwith in 1937. A fourth collection was made in 2000 in the Main Ridge Forest Reserve in Tobago.

== Conservation status ==
Although Duguetia tobagensis is not listed in the IUCN Red List, the authors of a 2008 assessment of the endemic plant species of Trinidad and Tobago considered it a vulnerable species, as it is known from fewer than five localities.

== See also ==
- Endemic flora of Trinidad and Tobago
