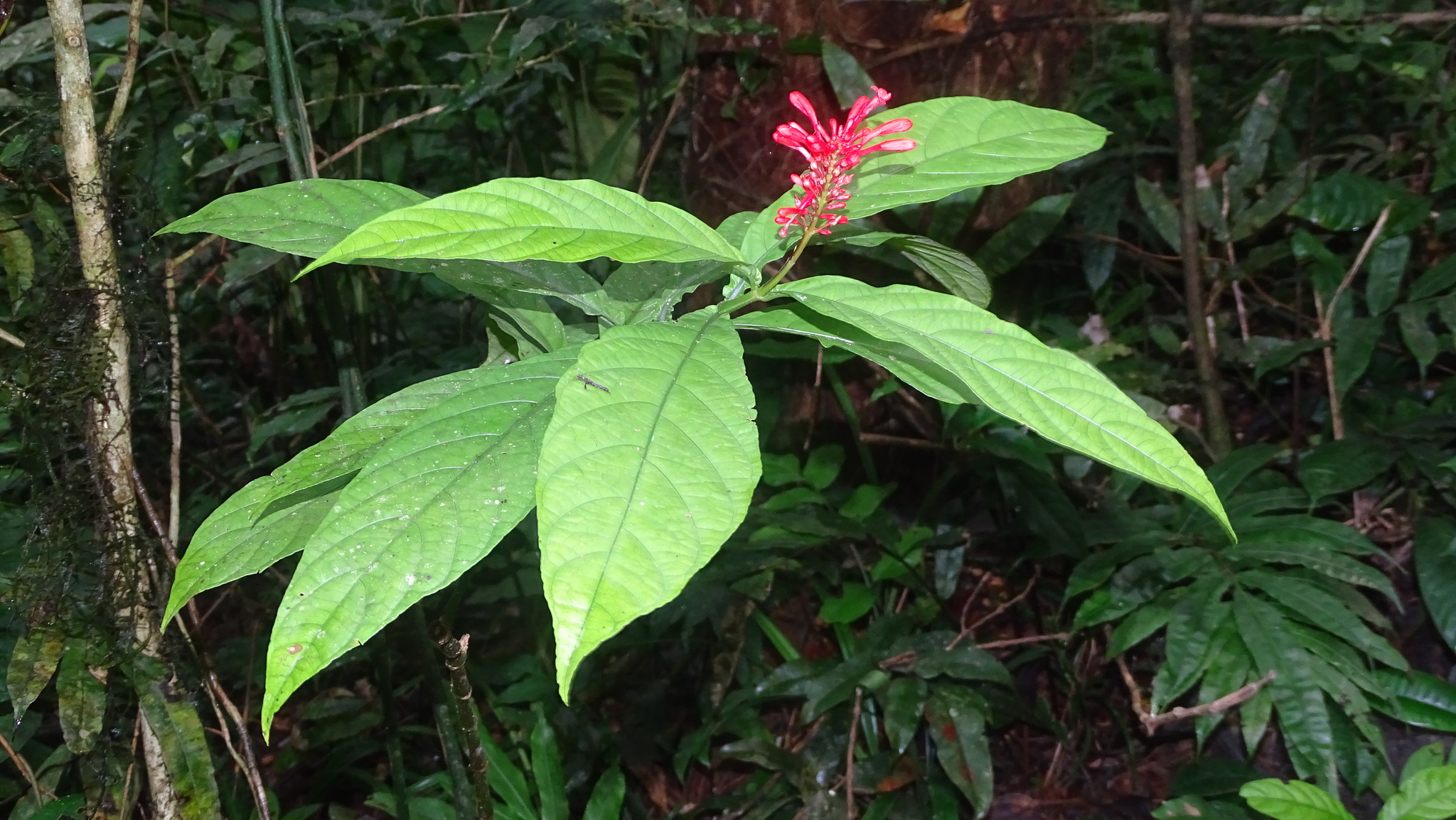

Scientific classification
- Kingdom: Plantae
- Clade: Tracheophytes
- Clade: Angiosperms
- Clade: Eudicots
- Clade: Asterids
- Order: Lamiales
- Family: Acanthaceae
- Genus: Odontonema
- Species: O. tubaeforme

Binomial name
- Odontonema tubaeforme (Bertol.) Kuntze (1891)

Synonyms
- Odontonema strictum

= Odontonema tubaeforme =

Species of plant

Odontonema tubaeforme is a plant in the family Acanthaceae native to Central America and naturalised as a garden escape in numerous other countries.

== Description ==
O. tubaeforme is an upright shrub up to 2 m or 3 m tall. Its elliptical, glossy leaves are 10 cm by 20 cm with a 2 cm petiole and arranged opposite each other on the stem. It has terminal spikes of waxy red to burgundy flowers, 30 mm long with 5 mm petals, and blooms in summer and autumn. It is grown as an annual frost-tender ornamental garden plant.

O. tubaeforme in cultivation

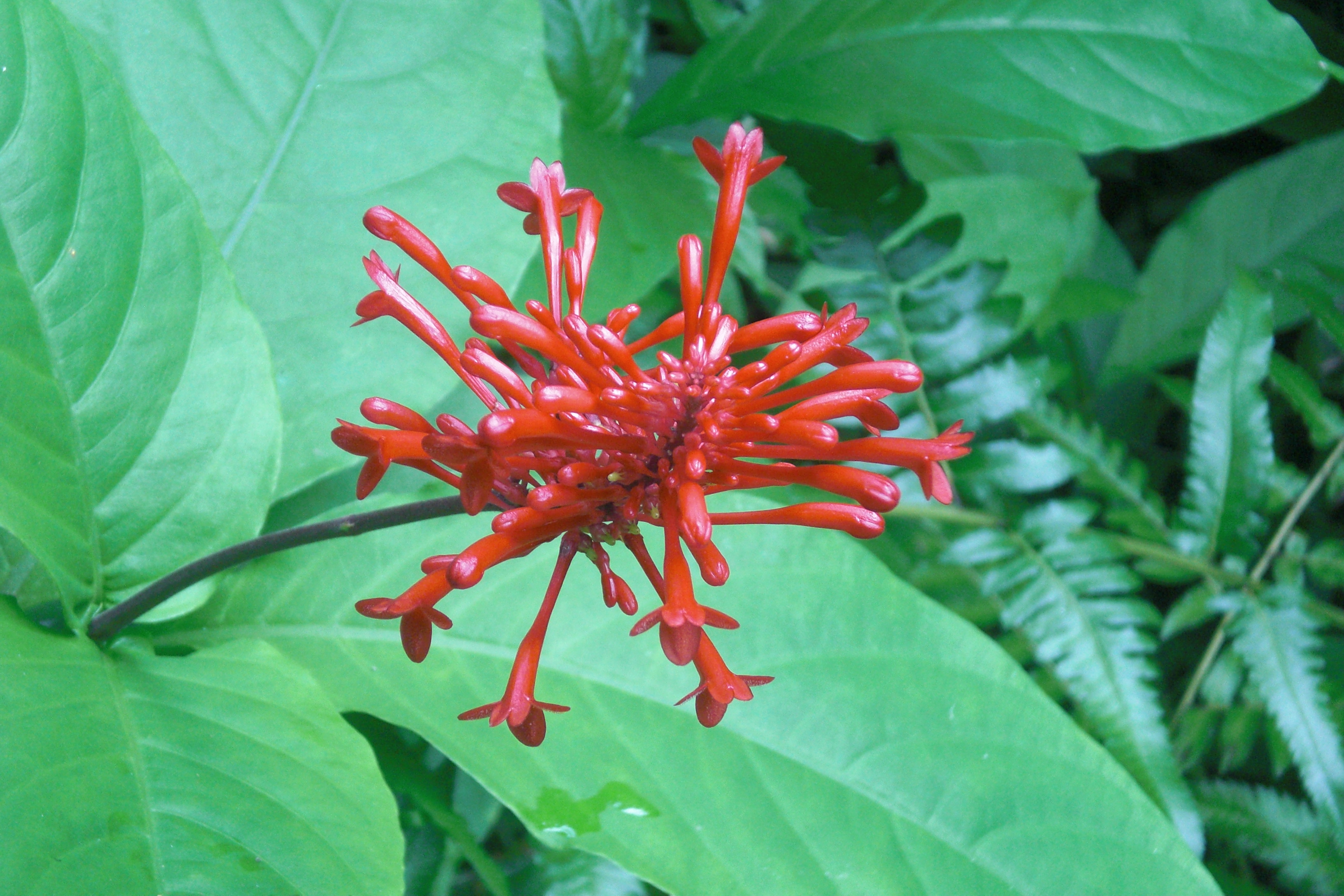
Tropical Botanical Garden, Papaikou, Hawaii

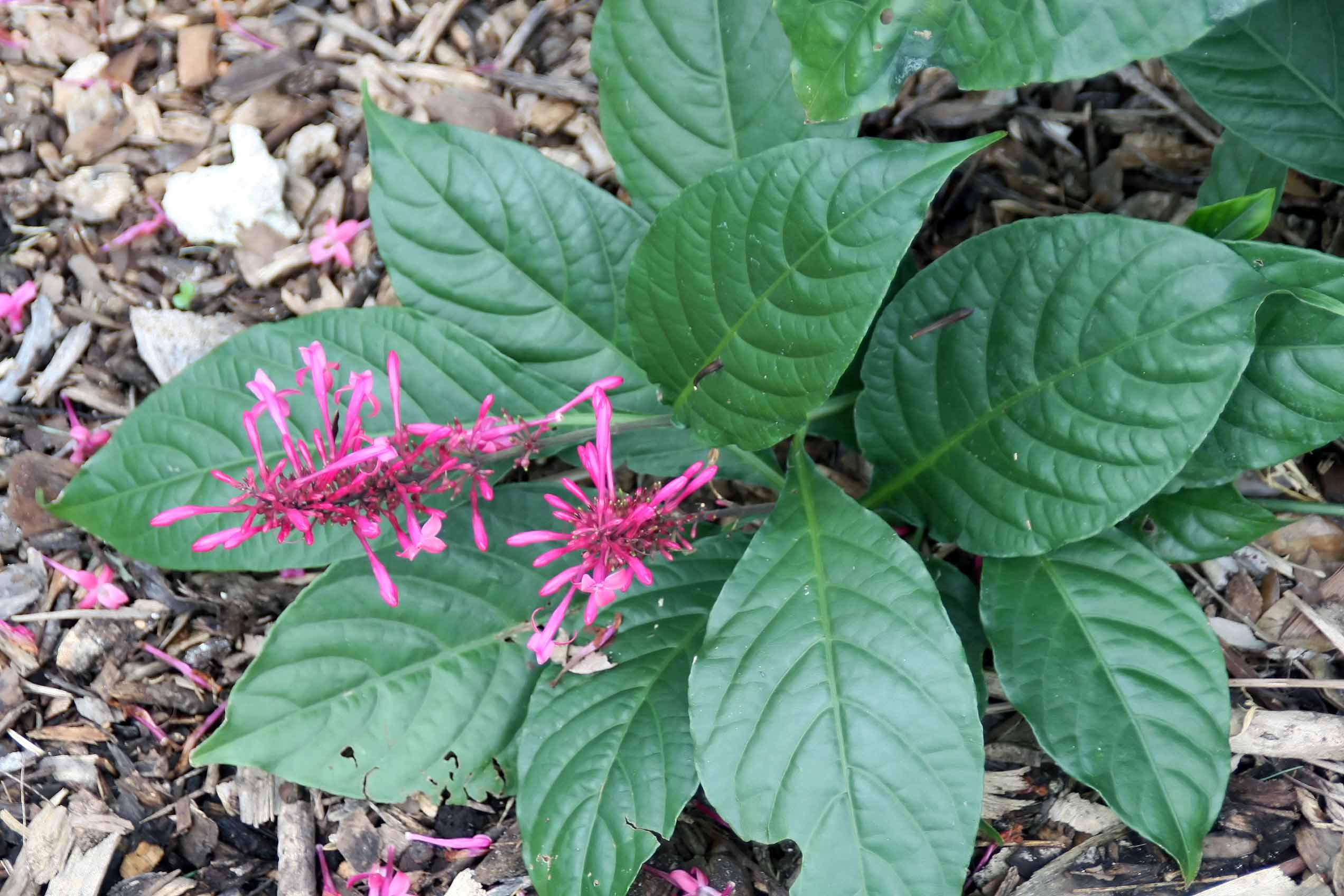
Fairchild Tropical Botanic Garden, Miami

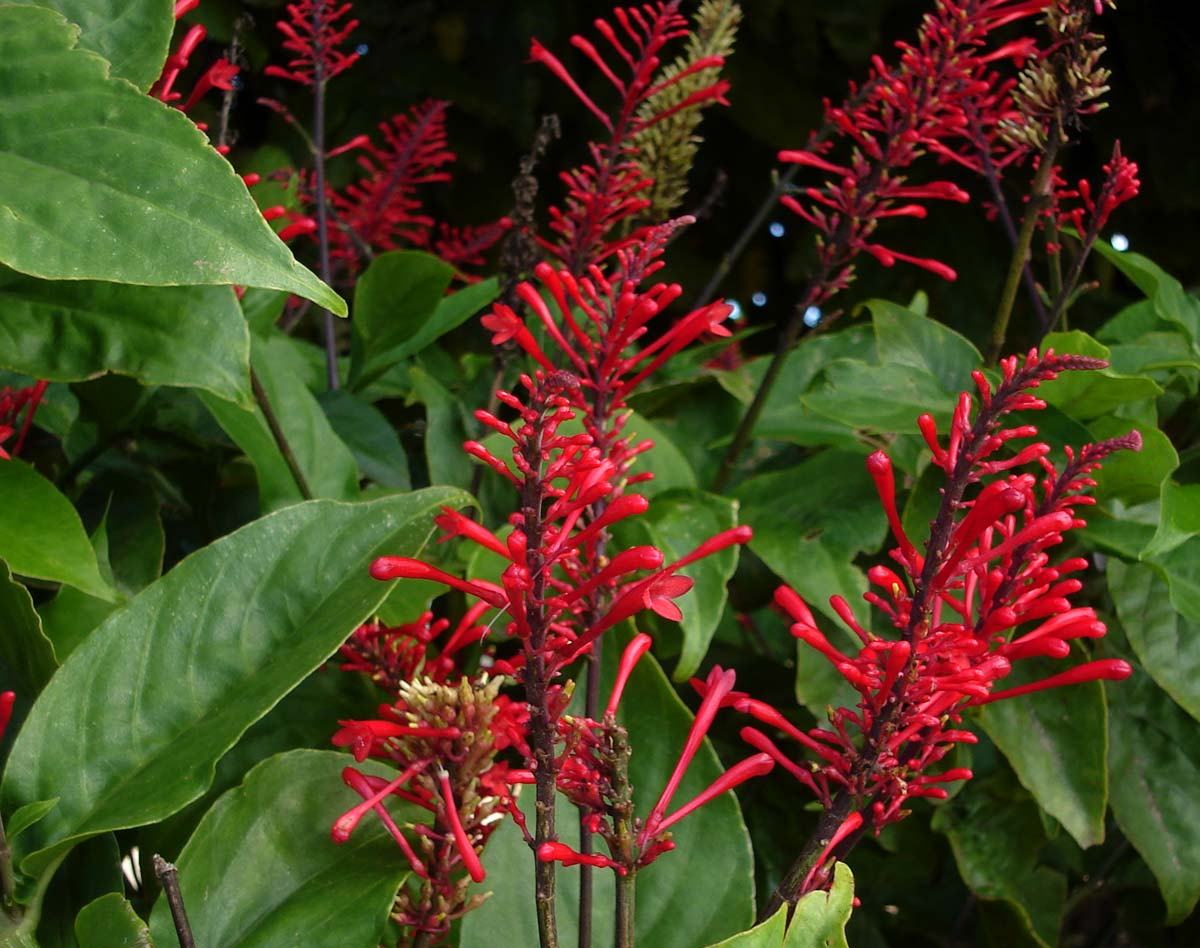
Tonga

== Range ==
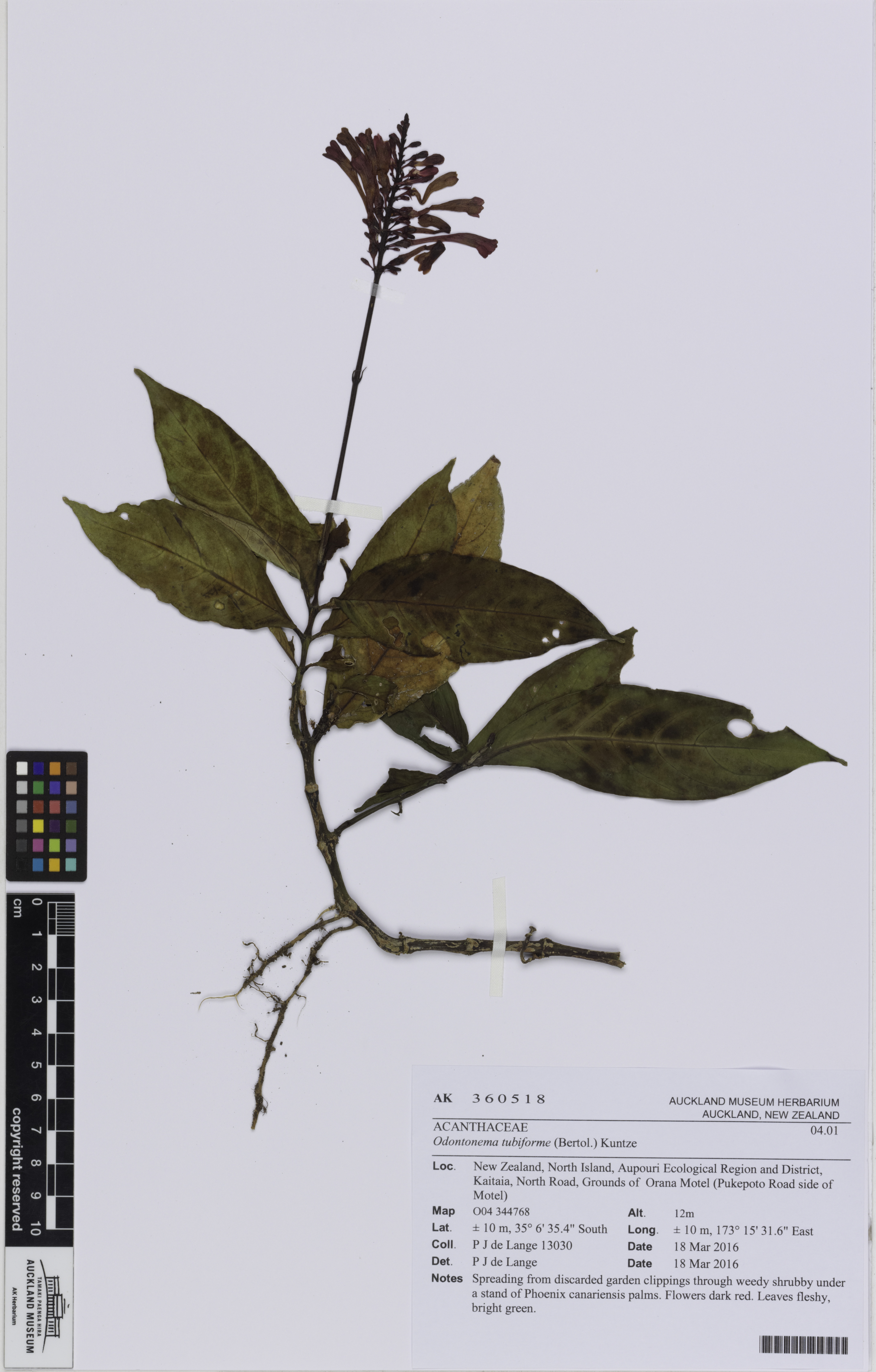
Naturalised O. tubaeforme collected at Kaitaia in the collection of Auckland War Memorial Museum.

O. tubaeforme is native to Central America, but has naturalised in several countries as an ornamental garden plant, including New Zealand and Australia. Since 2005 it has been recorded in the wild in the far north of New Zealand, at Auckland, Kaitaia, and Doubtless Bay. In New Zealand it usually spreads through the dumping of garden waste, although in one locality (Cooper's Beach) seedlings have been found. In the Pacific it is considered an invasive species, and has recently naturalised in Rarotonga and Mangaia in the Cook Islands.

== Name ==
The genus name "Odontonema" refers to the toothed filaments of the stamen, nema meaning "thread" and odonto "toothed". In English this species is known as cardinal flower, cardinal's guard, or fire spike.
