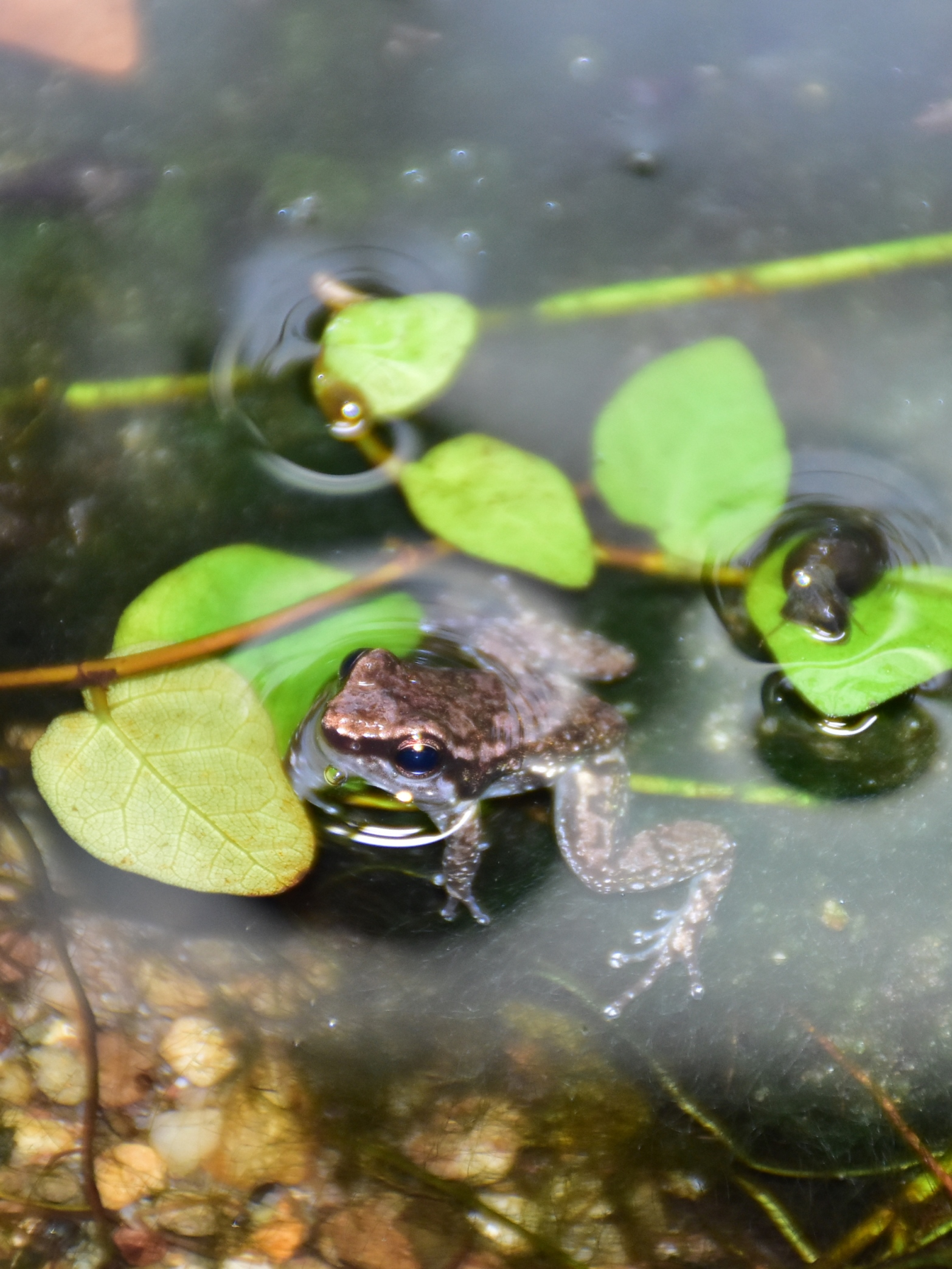

Conservation status
- Vulnerable (IUCN 3.1)

Scientific classification
- Kingdom: Animalia
- Phylum: Chordata
- Class: Amphibia
- Order: Anura
- Family: Aromobatidae
- Genus: Mannophryne
- Species: M. olmonae

Binomial name
- Mannophryne olmonae (Hardy, 1983)

= Bloody Bay poison frog =

Species of amphibian

The Bloody Bay poison frog or Tobago poison frog (Mannophryne olmonae) is a species of frog in the family Aromobatidae. It is endemic to Tobago Island and Little Tobago Island in Trinidad and Tobago.

== Description ==
The adult male frog measures 21.0 mm ± 2.4 mm in snout-vent length and the adult female frog 21.6 mm ± 2.2 mm. The skin of the dorsum is brown in color. There is a green mark in the shape of the letter X on the back that connects to the interorbital area. There is a mark in the shape of the letter V on the back nearer the posterior end. There is a light brown stripe edged in gray and a yellow stripe, also edged in gray, on each side of the body. The upper surfaces of the legs are light brown in color with dark marks and two yellow marks. There is yellow pigmentation on the belly.

== Habitat ==
This frog lives near streams in forests. Almost all of the forests in Tobago are secondary forests, former cacao plantations that have been growing back since the early 20th century. Scientists saw the frog between 30 and 4900 meters above sea level.

One of the places the frog lives is a protected rain reserve called Tobago Main Ridge Forest Reserve.

== Reproduction ==
The male frogs sit in crevices in rocks or on piles of rocks and call to the female frogs. The female frogs lay eggs on land. The male frogs guard the eggs. After the eggs hatch, the male frogs carry the tadpoles until they can swim. People have seen male Mannophryne olmonae with as many as 19 tadpoles on their backs at the same time. The male frogs choose water near streams but not in streams. These areas have fewer predators. Scientists say the tadpoles are probably detrivores. The tadpoles are dark brown in color. The tadpole's body is 8.0 mm wide and 10.8 mm long. Its tail is 24.5 mm long. So the tadpole is 35.3 mm long.

== Threats ==
The IUCN classifies this frog as vulnerable to extinction. In 2006, it had been classified as critically endangered, probably due to habitat loss. Scientists also detected the fungus Batrachochytrium dendrobatidis in these frogs, but they believe the disease chytridiomycosis is endemic to this species rather than lethal. The Republic of Trinidad and Tobago established Environmentally Sensitive Areas to protect frogs and other living things and the population has recovered somewhat.

== Original description ==
- Hardy (1983). "A new frog of the genus Colostethus from the island of Tobago, West Indies (Anura: Dendrobatidae).". Bulletin Maryland Herpetological Society. 19 (2): 47–57.
