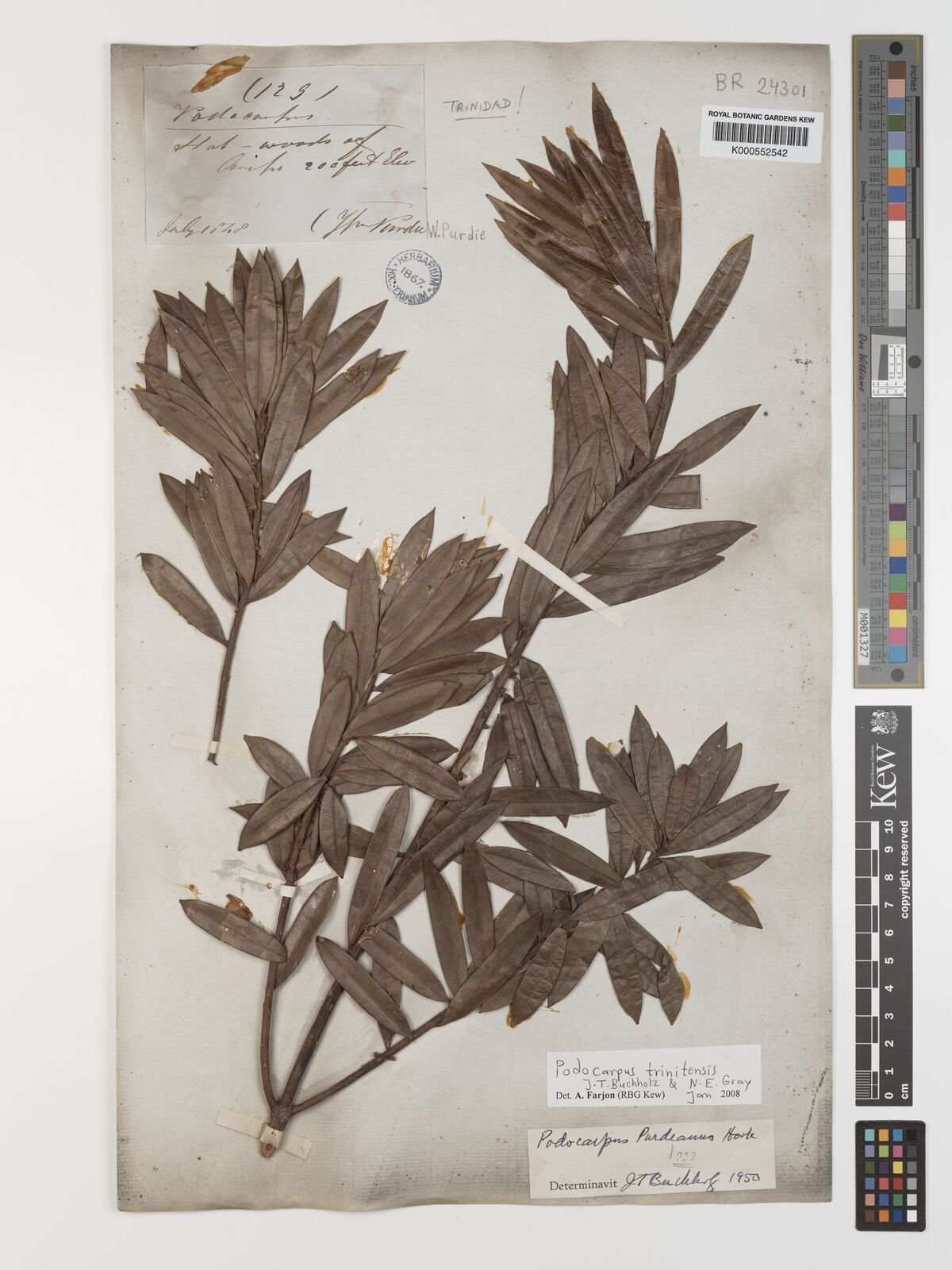

Conservation status
- Near Threatened (IUCN 3.1)

Scientific classification
- Kingdom: Plantae
- Clade: Tracheophytes
- Clade: Gymnosperms
- Division: Pinophyta
- Class: Pinopsida
- Order: Araucariales
- Family: Podocarpaceae
- Genus: Podocarpus
- Species: P. trinitensis

Binomial name
- Podocarpus trinitensis N.E.Gray

= Podocarpus trinitensis =

Species of conifer

Podocarpus trinitensis is a species of conifer in the family Podocarpaceae. It is endemic to the island of Trinidad in Trinidad and Tobago. It has been recorded from 13 distinct localities in Trinidad, including sites in the Central Range and in central and eastern areas of the Northern Range.

== Conservation status ==
Podocarpus trinitensis is considered a near threatened species by the IUCN.
