= Philodendron simmondsii =

Conservation status
- Endangered (IUCN 3.1)

Scientific classification
- Kingdom: Plantae
- Clade: Tracheophytes
- Clade: Angiosperms
- Clade: Monocots
- Order: Alismatales
- Family: Araceae
- Genus: Philodendron
- Species: P. simmondsii

Binomial name
- Philodendron simmondsii Mayo

Species of plant

Philodendron simmondsii is a species of flowering plant in the family Araceae, endemic to Trinidad. A climber, it is known from only four stations in the wet tropical forest of Trinidad, and is assessed as Endangered.
