= Geology of Trinidad and Tobago =

The geology of Trinidad and Tobago includes two different islands with different geological histories.

== Trinidad ==
The oldest rocks in Trinidad are low-grade metamorphosed phyllite, limestone and quartzite from the late Jurassic. Cretaceous quartzite, phyllite, shale and limestone outcrops around the Toco district. The east of the island is the only area with volcanic rocks exposed at the surface, including basalt, ash and breccia. Phyllite shale spans the north coast. Laventille Formation limestone is associated with these rocks and contains a gypsum layer. Flysch, dark shale and quartzite deposited during the Cretaceous, followed by Naparina Hill Formation argillite. During the Paleocene, the Lizard Springs Formation calcareous shale and the Chaudiere Formation non-calcareous shale both deposited. The Navet Formation with marl and calcareous shales formed during the Eocene and in the Central Range, uplift has raised the Point-a-Pierre Formation turbidite flysch of the same age. Clastic material and conglomerate marked a shift to erosion in uplifted areas in the late Eocene. The Central Range was uplifted in the Oligocene, although deep water clay and marl suggests a deepening of basins such as the Northern Basin.

The oil bearing Herrera sands are part of the largely Miocene age Cipero Formation. The Lengua and Tamana formation marks a shift back to deep-water clays along with reef limestones. Shallow deposition prevailed in many parts of the island into the Pliocene. Successive uplift and erosion became common in the Pliocene after the main phase of the Andean orogeny ended to the south. Changes in sea level during and since the Pleistocene have played a key role in deposition.

== Tobago terrane ==
The island of Tobago is situated on the Tobago terrane, a section of crust bounded by the South American and Caribbean plates. It is bounded by faults formed from the Cretaceous to the present and comprises Cretaceous oceanic crust, volcanogenic and pelagic marine sedimentary rocks, late Cretaceous and Paleogene island arc volcanic rocks and overlying sedimentary rocks from the Neogene. The original mafic oceanic crust formed more than 120 million years ago and was then underplated and deformed by the continental Araya-Margarita Terrane 90 million years ago, which drove volcanic activity and formed a forearc basin. In the Paleogene, the region was denuded by erosion and then overridden by the Paria-Trinidad Terrane. Extensive erosion and faulting has affected the southern part of the terrane since the Neogene.

The Mesozoic rocks on the island are divided into the North Coast Schist, mafic plutonic rocks, the Tobago Volcanic Group and mafic dikes.
