= Emery Clarence Leonard =

- Born: January 9, 1892; Champaign County, Illinois
- Died: 1968
- Citizenship: United States
- Education: A.B., Wittenberg College, A.M., Ohio State University
- Scientific career
- Workplaces: National Museum of Natural History

Emery Clarence Leonard (1892–1968) was an American botanist known for his work on the Acanthaceae plant family and on the flora of Haiti. He collected plants with his wife Genevieve M. Leonard.
