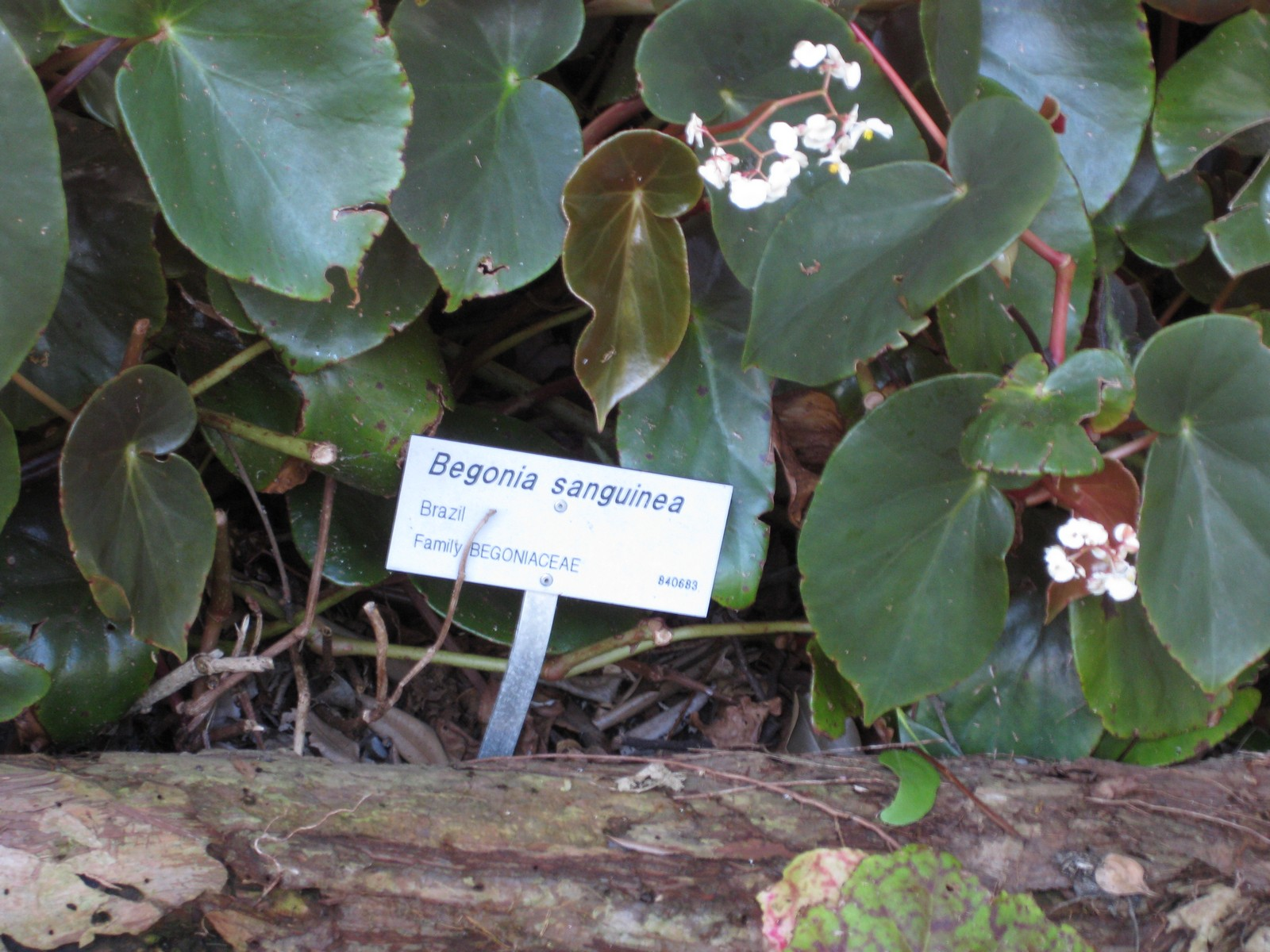
- At the Royal Botanic Garden, Sydney
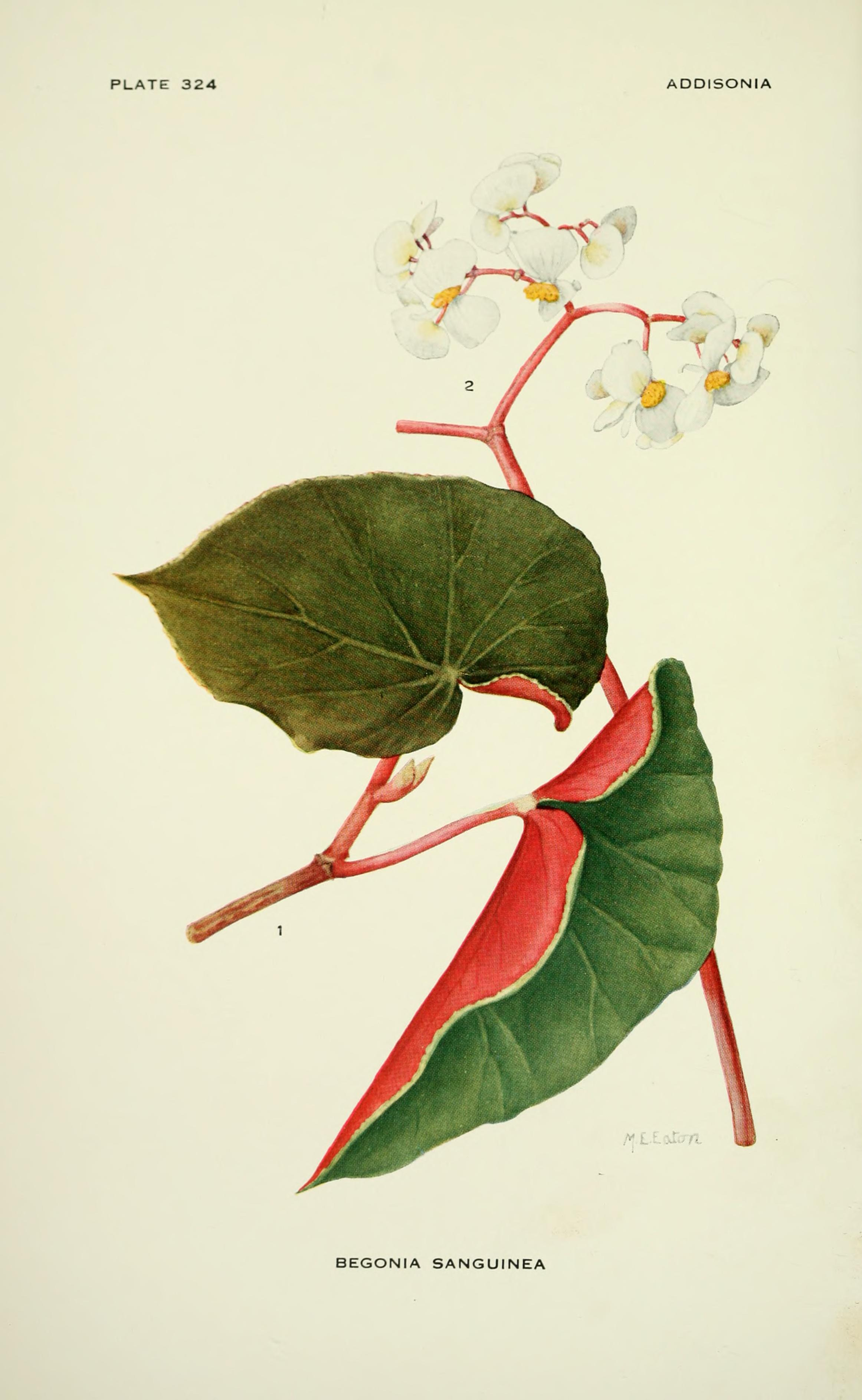
- Botanical illustration

Scientific classification
- Kingdom: Plantae
- Clade: Tracheophytes
- Clade: Angiosperms
- Clade: Eudicots
- Clade: Rosids
- Order: Cucurbitales
- Family: Begoniaceae
- Genus: Begonia
- Species: B. sanguinea

Binomial name
- Begonia sanguinea Raddi

Synonyms
- Pritzelia sanguinea (Raddi) Klotzsch

= Begonia sanguinea =

Species of flowering plant

Begonia sanguinea, the beefsteak begonia or blood-red begonia, is a species of flowering plant in the family Begoniaceae, native to southern Brazil. Valued for the deep red color of the abaxial surface of their leaves, they are easy to propagate from cuttings.
