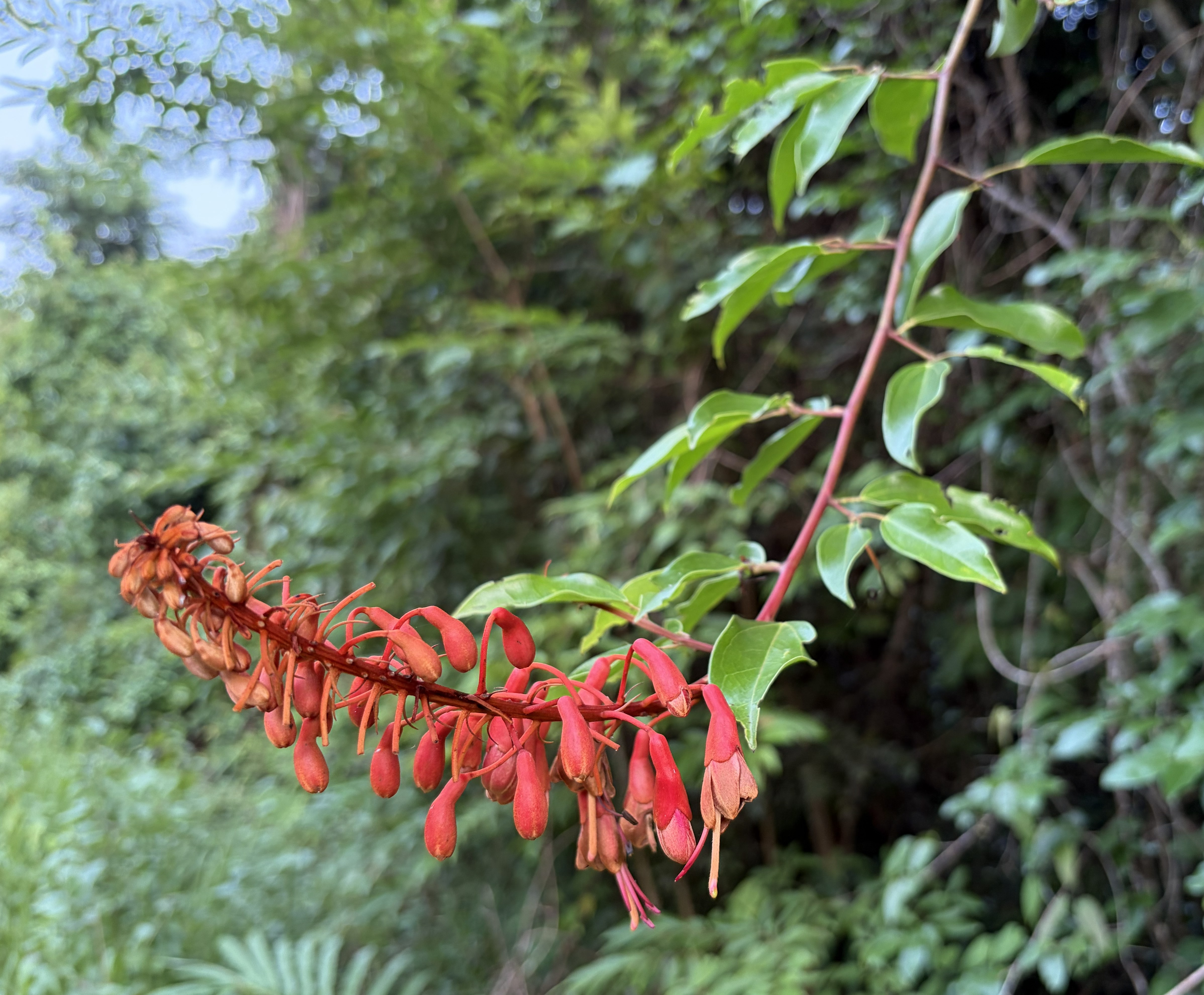
- flower taken in Cat Tien National Park

Scientific classification
- Kingdom: Plantae
- Clade: Embryophytes
- Clade: Tracheophytes
- Clade: Spermatophytes
- Clade: Angiosperms
- Clade: Eudicots
- Clade: Rosids
- Order: Fabales
- Family: Fabaceae
- Genus: Phanera
- Species: P. cardinalis

Binomial name
- Phanera cardinalis (Pierre ex Gagnep.) Sinou & Bruneau

Synonyms
- Homotypic: Bauhinia cardinalis Pierre ex Gagnep., 1912; Lasiobema cardinale (Pierre ex Gagnep.) de Wit, 1956; Heterotypic: Bauhinia dolichobotrys Merr., 1938; Lasiobema dolichobotrys (Merr.) A.Schmitz, 1973

= Phanera cardinalis =

Species of legume

Phanera cardinalis is a species of lianas in the subfamily Cercidoideae and the tribe Bauhinieae, the genus having been separated from Bauhinia and also placed in the defunct genus Lasiobema. Under its synonym, Bauhinia cardinalis, records exist from Vietnam, where it is called móng bò đỏ, mấu hang or mấu tràm; no subspecies were listed in the Catalogue of Life.
