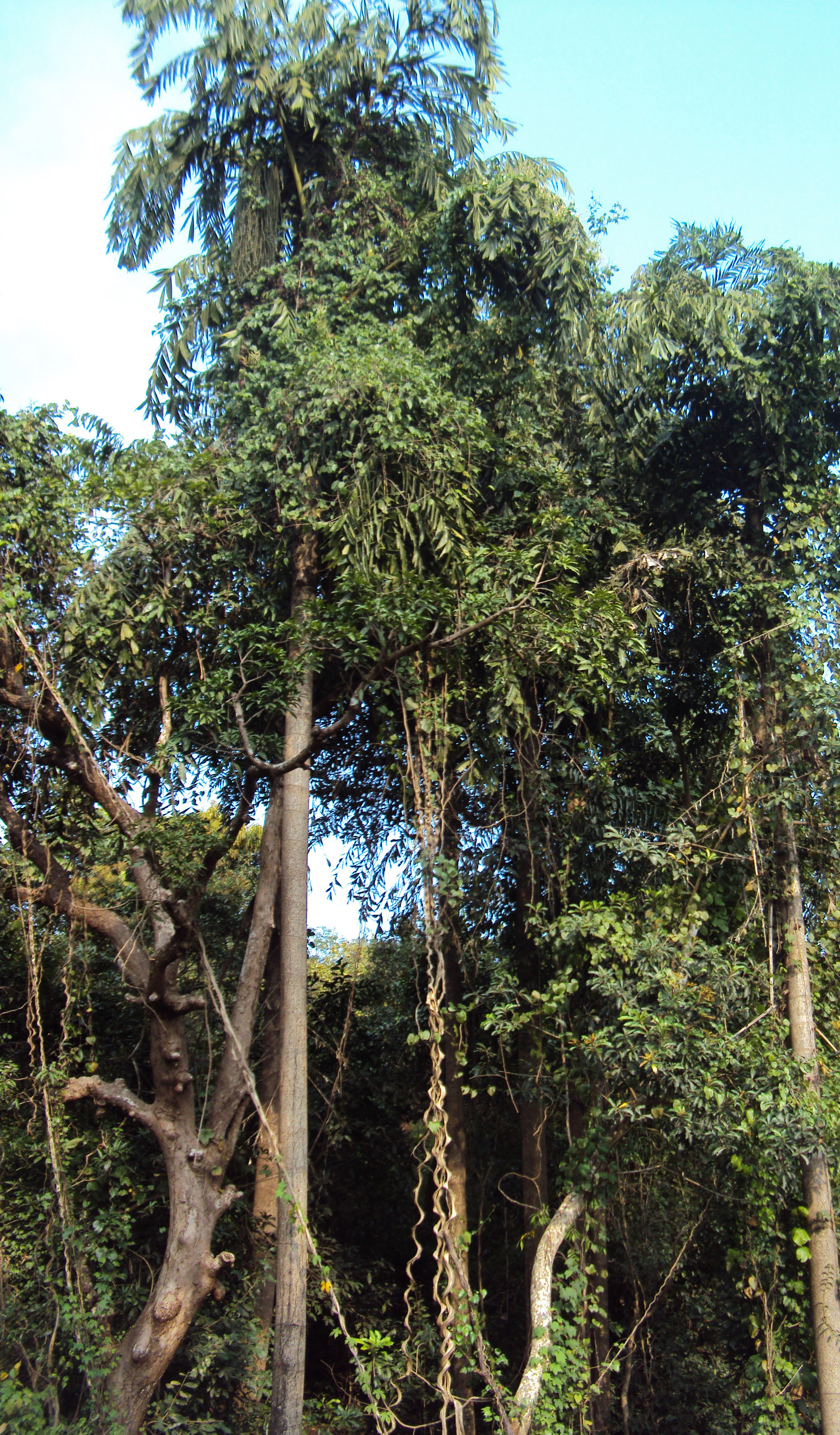

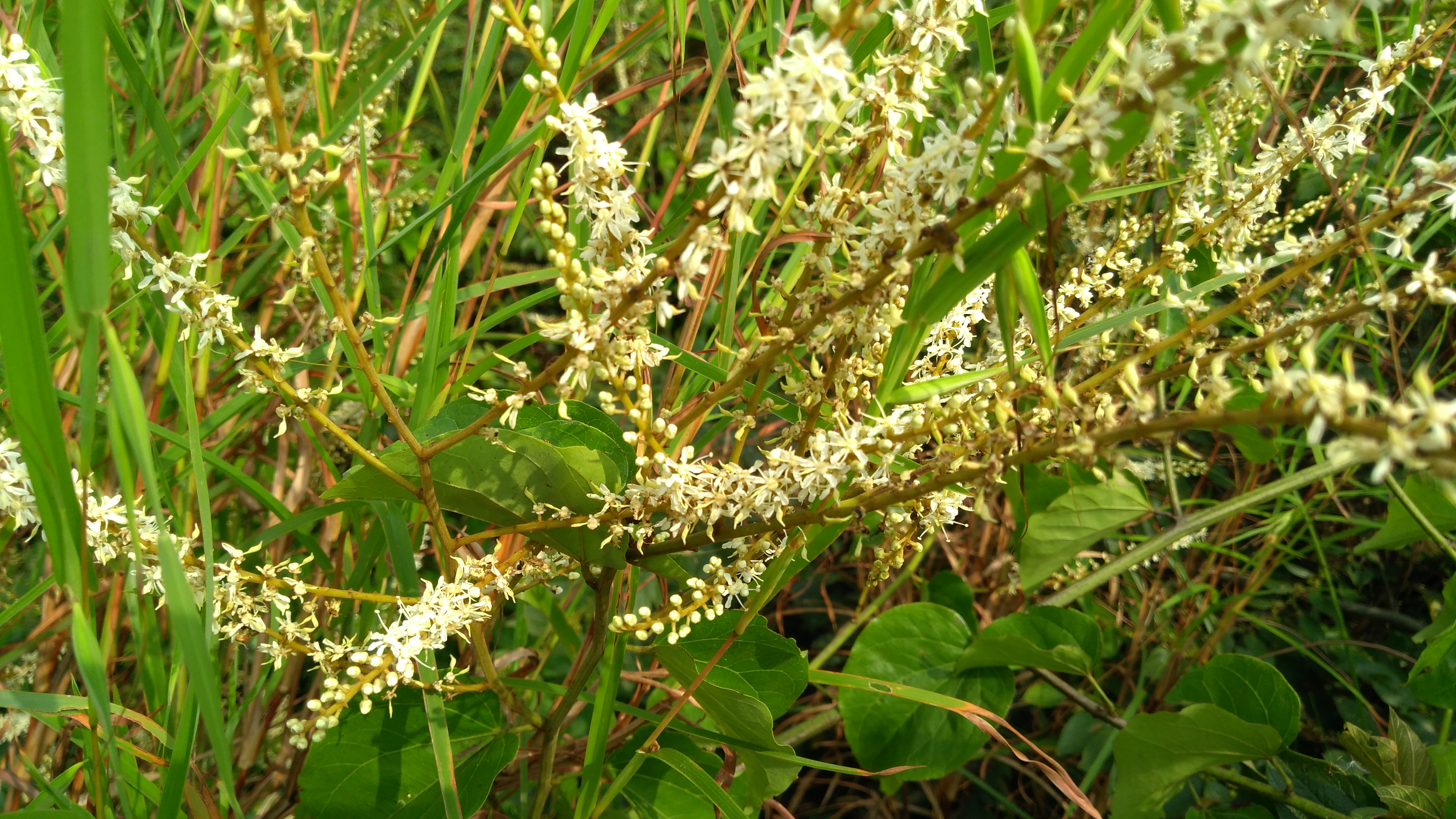

Scientific classification
- Kingdom: Plantae
- Clade: Tracheophytes
- Clade: Angiosperms
- Clade: Eudicots
- Clade: Rosids
- Order: Fabales
- Family: Fabaceae
- Genus: Phanera
- Species: P. scandens

Binomial name
- Phanera scandens (Linné) Lour. ex Raf., 1838

Synonyms
- Bauhinia scandens (Linné) de Wit; Phanera scandens (Linné)Raf. Phanera debilis (Hassk.)Miq. Phanera bifoliata Miq. Bauhinia scandens Linné; Lasiobema anguinum (Roxb.)Miq. Lasiobema anguina (Roxb.)Miq. Lasiobema scandens (Linné) de Wit; Lasiobema scandens var. horsfieldii (Miq.) de Wit; Bauhinia piperifolia Roxb. Bauhinia horsfieldii (Miq.)J.F.Macbr. Bauhinia debilis Hassk. Bauhinia anguina var. horsfieldii (Miq.)Prain; Bauhinia anguina Roxb.

= Phanera scandens =

Species of legume

Phanera scandens synonym Bauhinia scandens (Common name Snake Climber) is a species of 'monkey ladder' lianas in the subfamily Cercidoideae and the tribe Bauhinieae, the genus having been separated from Bauhinia and the discontinued genus Lasiobema (possibly placed as a section). Under its synonym, Bauhinia scandens, records exist from the Indian subcontinent, Indo-China and Malesia. Under the name Bauhinia scandens var. horsfieldii its Vietnamese name is móng bò leo. At each node there are two tendrils and a leaf measuring 9 cm by 9 cm with a deep cleft and two drip tips. The white flowers have five petals that are clawed. These are produced in large spikes.

== Gallery ==
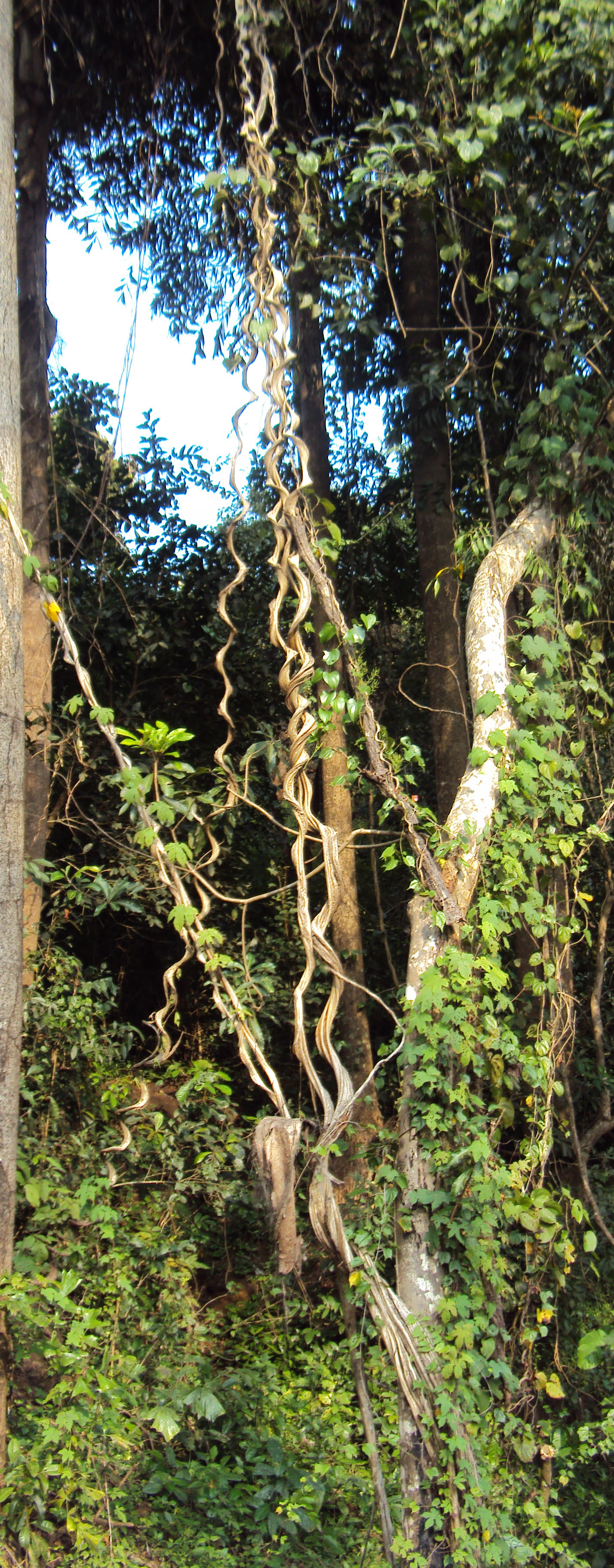

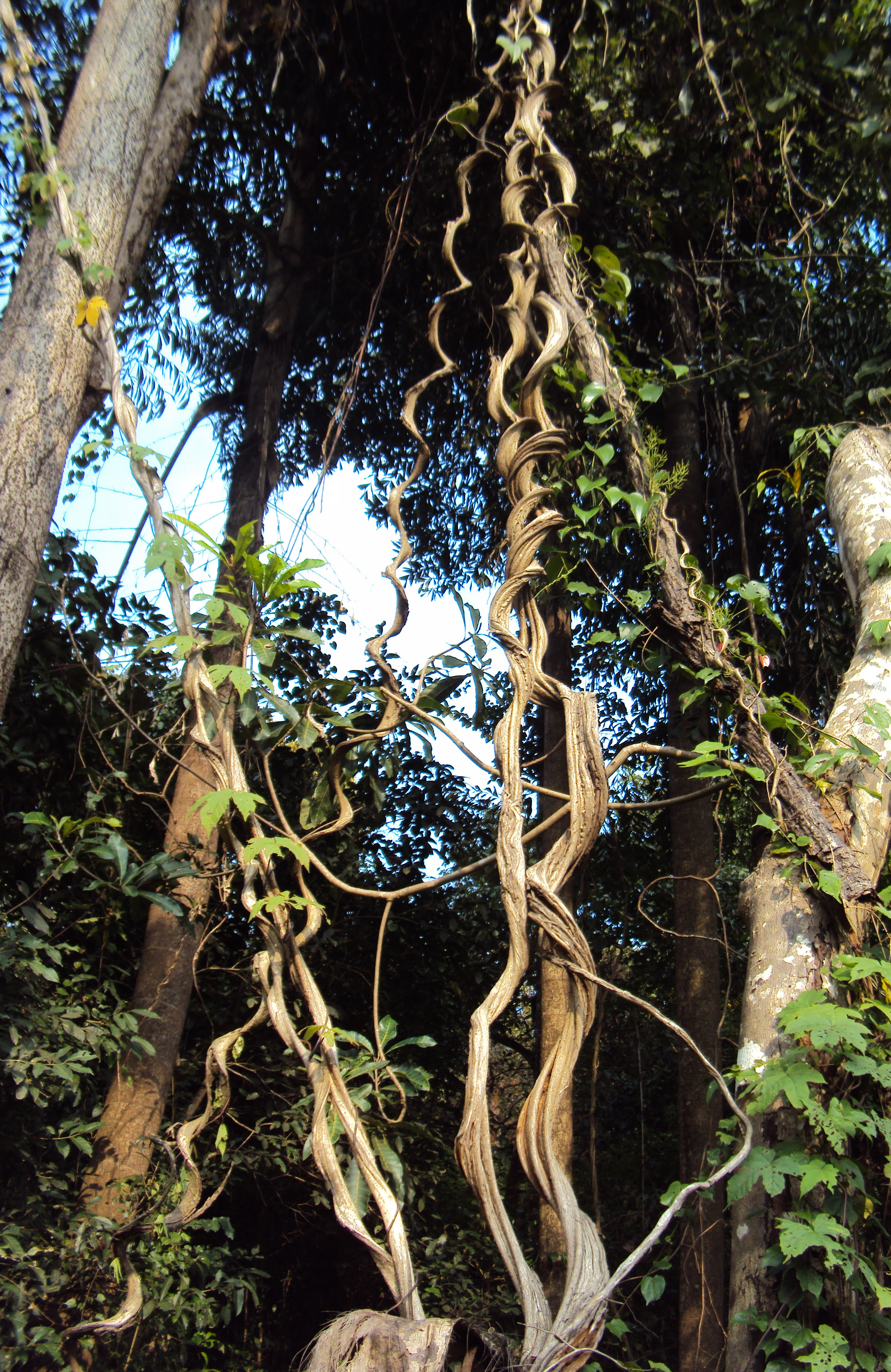

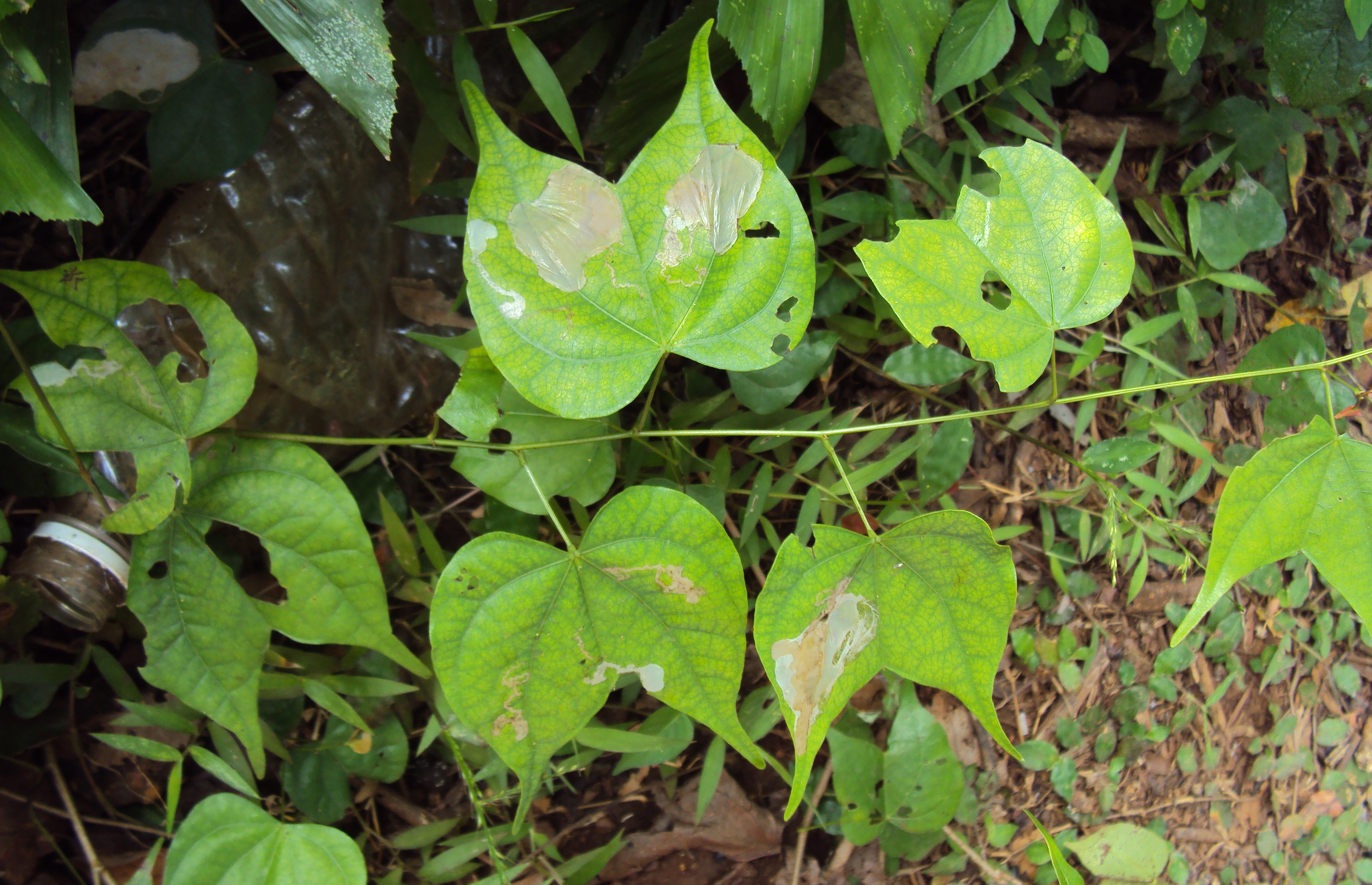

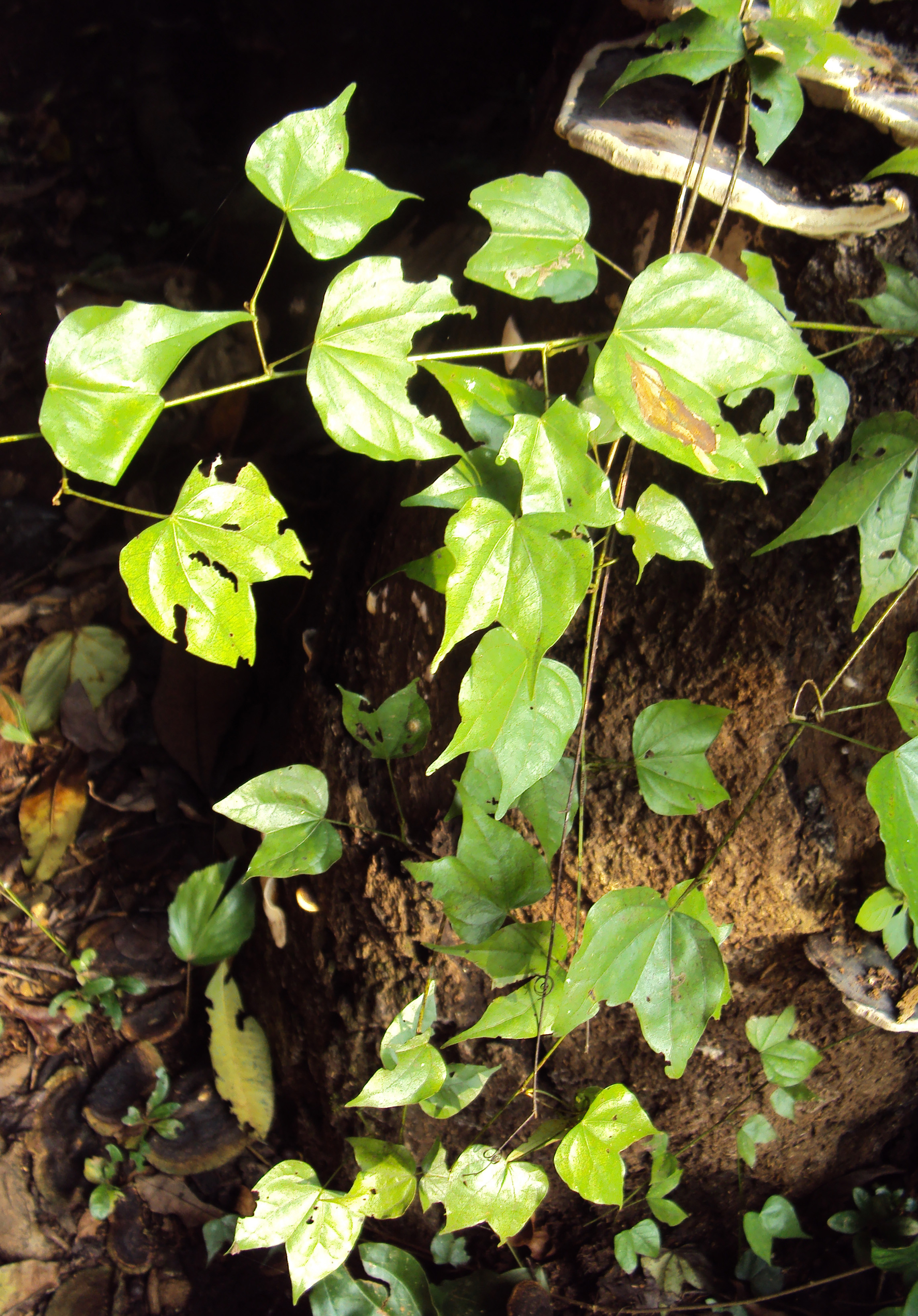

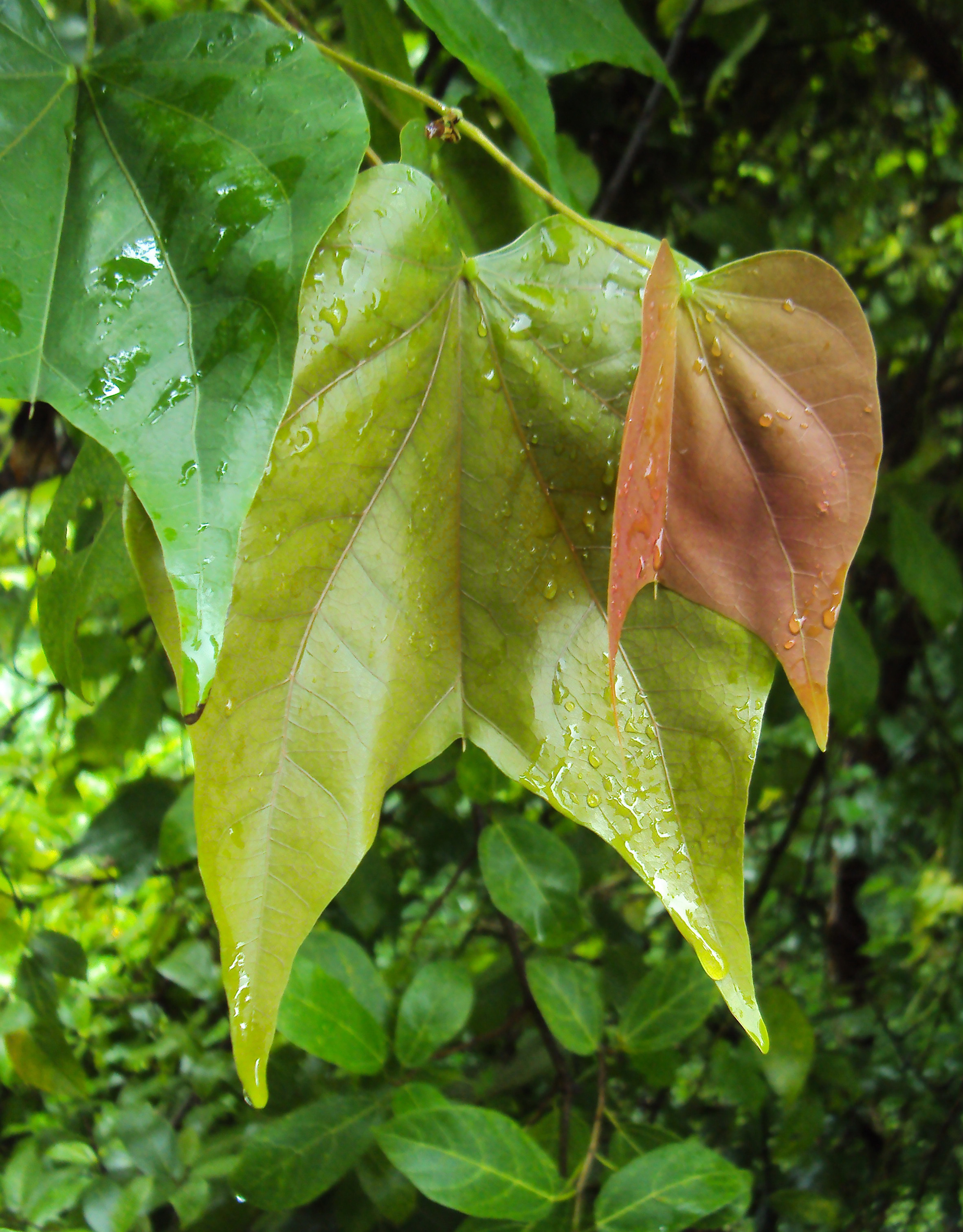
