= Phanera curtisii =

Scientific classification
- Kingdom: Plantae
- Clade: Tracheophytes
- Clade: Angiosperms
- Clade: Eudicots
- Clade: Rosids
- Order: Fabales
- Family: Fabaceae
- Genus: Phanera
- Species: P. curtisii

Binomial name
- Phanera curtisii (Prain) Bandyop. & Ghoshal

Synonyms
- Homotypic: Bauhinia curtisii Prain; Lasiobema curtisii (Prain) de Wit; Heterotypic: Bauhinia calcicola Craib

Species of legume

Phanera curtisii is a species of 'monkey ladder' lianas in the subfamily Cercidoideae and the tribe Bauhinieae, the genus having been separated from Bauhinia and the defunct genus Lasiobema. It is a climbing shrub native to Indochina (Cambodia, Laos, Thailand, and Vietnam) and Peninsular Malaysia.
