= Phanera khasiana =

Scientific classification
- Kingdom: Plantae
- Clade: Tracheophytes
- Clade: Angiosperms
- Clade: Eudicots
- Clade: Rosids
- Order: Fabales
- Family: Fabaceae
- Genus: Phanera
- Species: P. khasiana

Binomial name
- Phanera khasiana Baker Thoth.

Synonyms
- Homotypic: Bauhinia khasiana Baker

Species of plant

Phanera khasiana is a species of a "climbing shrub" or liana which grows primarily in tropical forest biomes; it is placed in the subfamily Cercidoideae and the tribe Bauhinieae, the genus having been separated from Bauhinia. Under its synonym Bauhinia khasiana, its Vietnamese names include "móng bò" indet. "mấu". The native range of this species is from Arunachal Pradesh to Hainan and Indochina.

== Accepted infraspecifics ==
As of January 2026, Plants of the World Online accepts the following three varieties:

- P. khasiana var. gigalobia (D.X. Zhang) Bandyop., P.P. Ghoshal & M.K. Pathak
- P. khasiana var. khasiana (Baker) Thoth.
- P. khasiana var. tomentella (T.C. Chen) Bandyop., P.P. Ghoshal & M.K. Pathak
