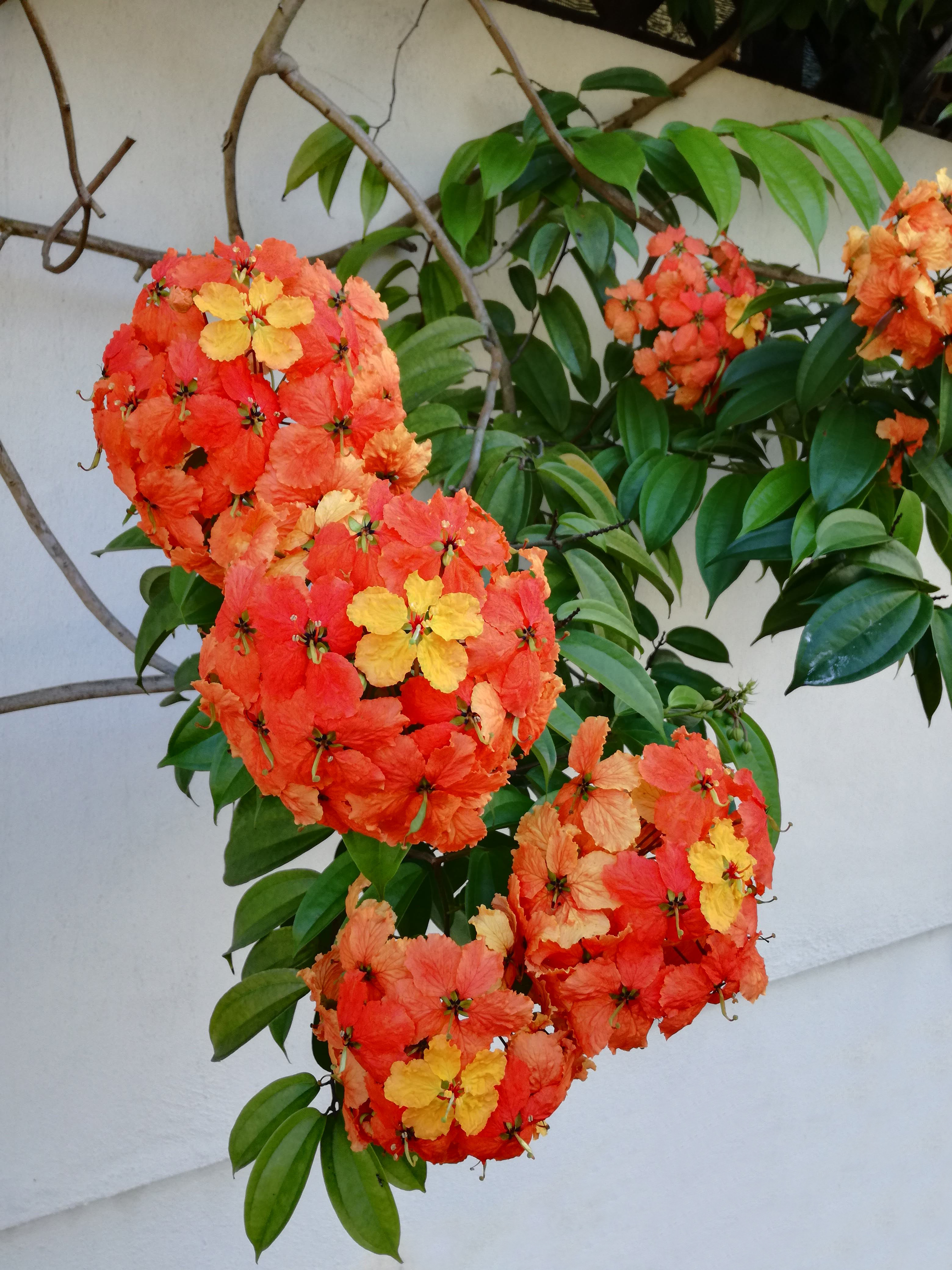

Scientific classification
- Kingdom: Plantae
- Clade: Tracheophytes
- Clade: Angiosperms
- Clade: Eudicots
- Clade: Rosids
- Order: Fabales
- Family: Fabaceae
- Genus: Phanera
- Species: P. kockiana

Binomial name
- Phanera kockiana (Korth.) Benth.

= Phanera kockiana =

Species of flowering plant

Phanera kockiana is a liana native to the East Indies and Malay Peninsula in the subfamily Cercidoideae of the bean family. It is commonly called the climbing bauhinia and can grow to 30 m (98 ft) or more. The lanceolate leaves have three major veins running from petiole to tip. The flowers open yellow, but turn red in a couple days.

== Intraspecifics ==
As of September 2026, Plants of the World Online includes the following varieties:

1. P. kockiana var. angustifolia (K. Larsen & S.S. Larsen) Bandyop., P.P. Ghoshal & M.K. Pathak
2. P. kockiana var. bakoensis (K. Larsen & S.S. Larsen) Bandyop., P.P. Ghoshal & M.K. Pathak
3. P. kockiana var. beccarii (K. Larsen & S.S. Larsen) Bandyop., P.P. Ghoshal & M.K. Pathak
4. P. kockiana var. brevipedicellata (K. Larsen & S.S. Larsen) Bandyop., P.P. Ghoshal & M.K. Pathak
5. P. kockiana var. calcicola (K. Larsen & S.S. Larsen) Bandyop., P.P. Ghoshal & M.K. Pathak
6. P. kockiana var. kockiana (Korth.) Benth.
7. P. kockiana var. scarlatina (Cammerl.) Bandyop., P.P. Ghoshal & M.K. Pathak
8. P. kockiana var. sericeinervia de Wit
9. P. kockiana var. velutina de Wit

Note

P. kockiana var. burbidgei has been reclassified as Phanera burbidgei (Stapf) Bandyop., P.P. Ghoshal & M.K. Pathak.
