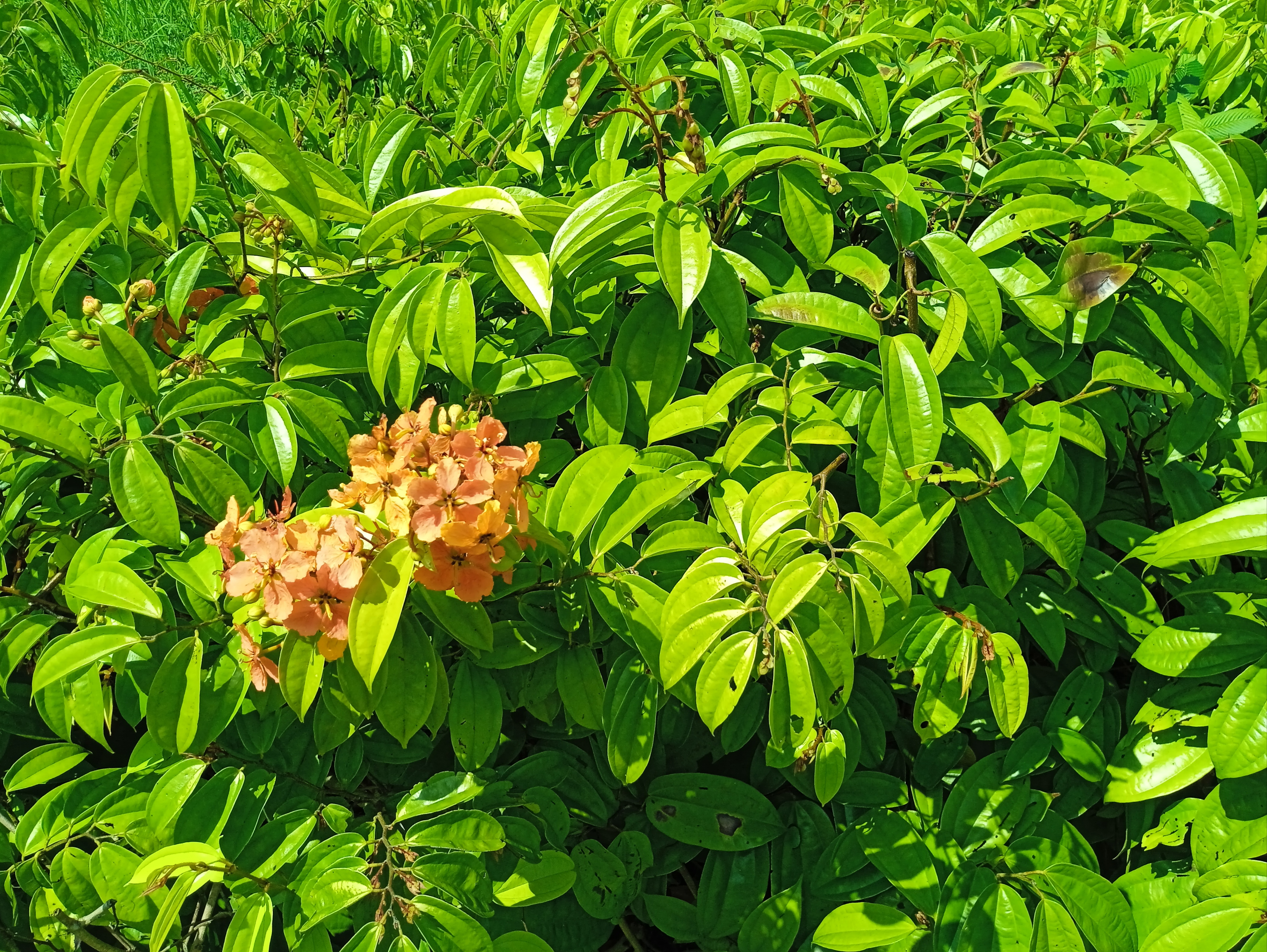
- Phanera coccinea flowers and leaves

Scientific classification
- Kingdom: Plantae
- Clade: Embryophytes
- Clade: Tracheophytes
- Clade: Spermatophytes
- Clade: Angiosperms
- Clade: Eudicots
- Clade: Rosids
- Order: Fabales
- Family: Fabaceae
- Genus: Phanera
- Species: P. coccinea

Binomial name
- Phanera coccinea Lour.

Synonyms
- Bauhinia coccinea (Lour.) DC.

= Phanera coccinea =

Species of plant

Phanera coccinea is a flowering plant in the legume family, Fabaceae. It is the type species of the genus Phanera: a "climbing shrub" in the subfamily Cercidoideae and the tribe Bauhinieae, the genus having been separated from Bauhinia. Under its synonym Bauhinia coccinea, its Vietnamese names include "quạch" and "mấu". Records of distribution exist from the subtropical and tropical forests of Indochina (Cambodia, Laos, Vietnam) and South-central China.

== Accepted infraspecifics ==
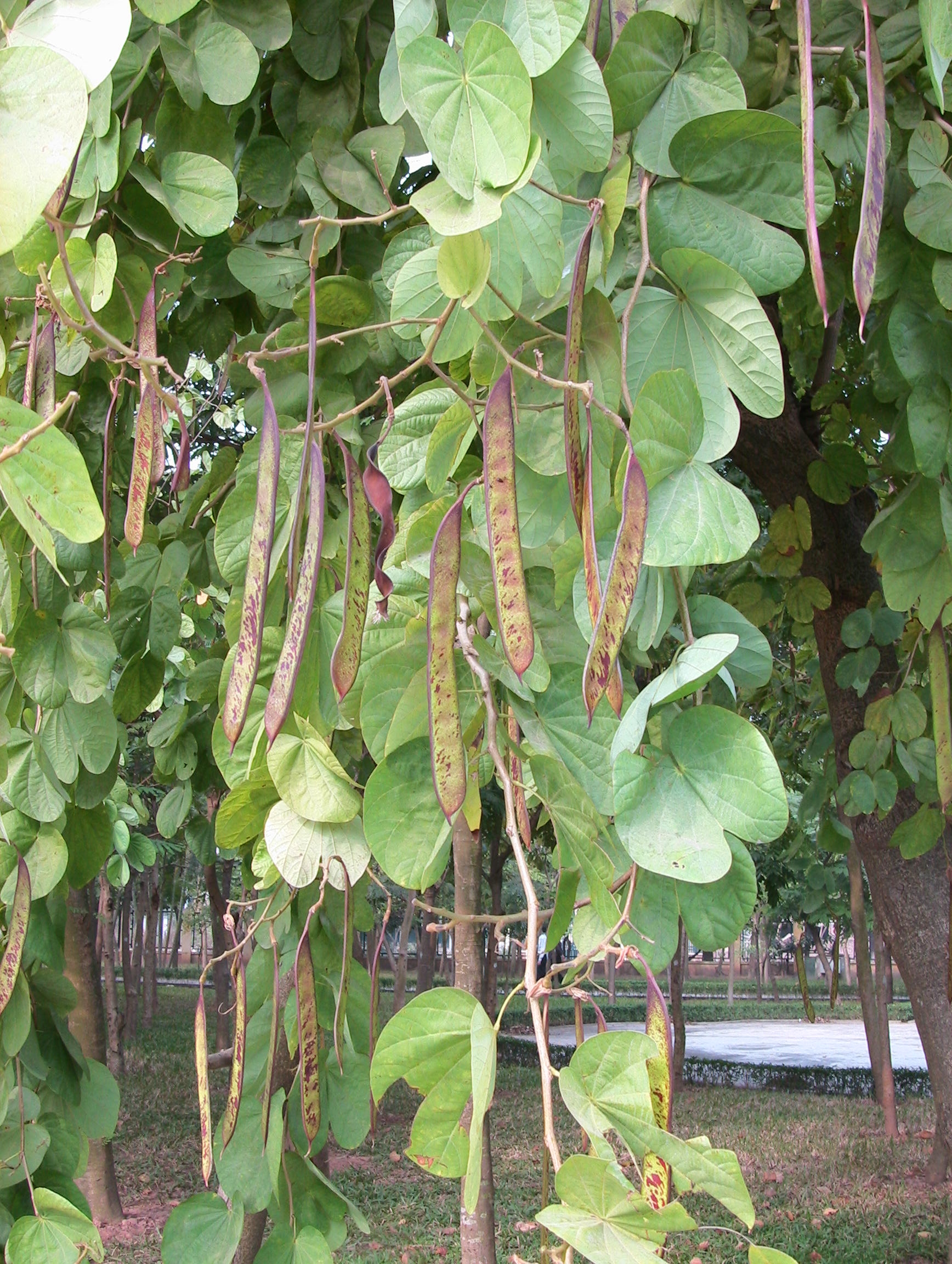
Pods of Phanera coccinea subsp. coccinea

Plants of the World Online lists:

- Phanera coccinea subsp. coccinea
- Phanea coccinea subsp. tonkinensis (Gagnep.) Mackinder & R.Clark (Yunnan, Indochina)
