= Phanera ornata =

Conservation status
- Least Concern (IUCN 3.1)

Scientific classification
- Kingdom: Plantae
- Clade: Tracheophytes
- Clade: Angiosperms
- Clade: Eudicots
- Clade: Rosids
- Order: Fabales
- Family: Fabaceae
- Subfamily: Cercidoideae
- Tribe: Bauhinieae
- Genus: Phanera
- Species: P. ornata

Binomial name
- Phanera ornata (Kurz) Thoth.

Synonyms
- Bauhinia ornata Kurz

Species of plant

Phanera ornata is a species of lianas in the family Fabaceae. It is in the subfamily Cercidoideae and the tribe Bauhinieae, the genus having been separated from Bauhinia. Under its synonym, Bauhinia ornata, its Vietnamese name is "móng bò diện". Distribution records exist from Assam, S. China and Indochina, where wild plants grow primarily in the tropical forest biome.

== Accepted infraspecific names ==
Plants of the World Online lists:

- P. ornata subsp. mizoramensis (Bandyop., B.D. Sharma & Thoth.) Bandyop., P.P. Ghoshal & M.K. Pathak - Assam (Mizoram) only
- P. ornata subsp. ornata (Kurz) Thoth.
  - P. ornata var. balansae (Gagnep.) Bandyop., P.P. Ghoshal & M.K. Pathak
  - P. ornata var. burmanica (K. Larsen & S.S. Larsen) Bandyop., P.P. Ghoshal & M.K. Pathak
  - P. ornata var. kerrii (Gagnep.) Bandyop., P.P. Ghoshal & M.K. Pathak (synonym P. o. var. subumbellata)
  - P. ornata var. ornata (Kurz) Thoth.
