= Phanera saigonensis =

Scientific classification
- Kingdom: Plantae
- Clade: Tracheophytes
- Clade: Angiosperms
- Clade: Eudicots
- Clade: Rosids
- Order: Fabales
- Family: Fabaceae
- Genus: Phanera
- Species: P. saigonensis

Binomial name
- Phanera saigonensis (Pierre ex Gagnep.) Mackinder & R.Clark

Synonyms
- Bauhinia saïgonensis Gagnep.

Species of plant

Phanera saigonensis is a species of lianas in the subfamily Cercidoideae and the tribe Bauhinieae, the genus having been separated from Bauhinia. Under its synonym Bauhinia saïgonensis, records exist from the seasonal tropical forests of Indochina only.

== Accepted infraspecifics ==
Plants of the World Online lists:

- Phanera saigonensis var. gagnepainiana (K.Larsen & S.S.Larsen) Mackinder & R.Clark (not Vietnam)
- Phanera saigonensis var. poilanei (K.Larsen & S.S.Larsen) Mackinder & R.Clark (Vietnam only)
- Phanera saigonensis var. saigonensis (Vietnam only)
