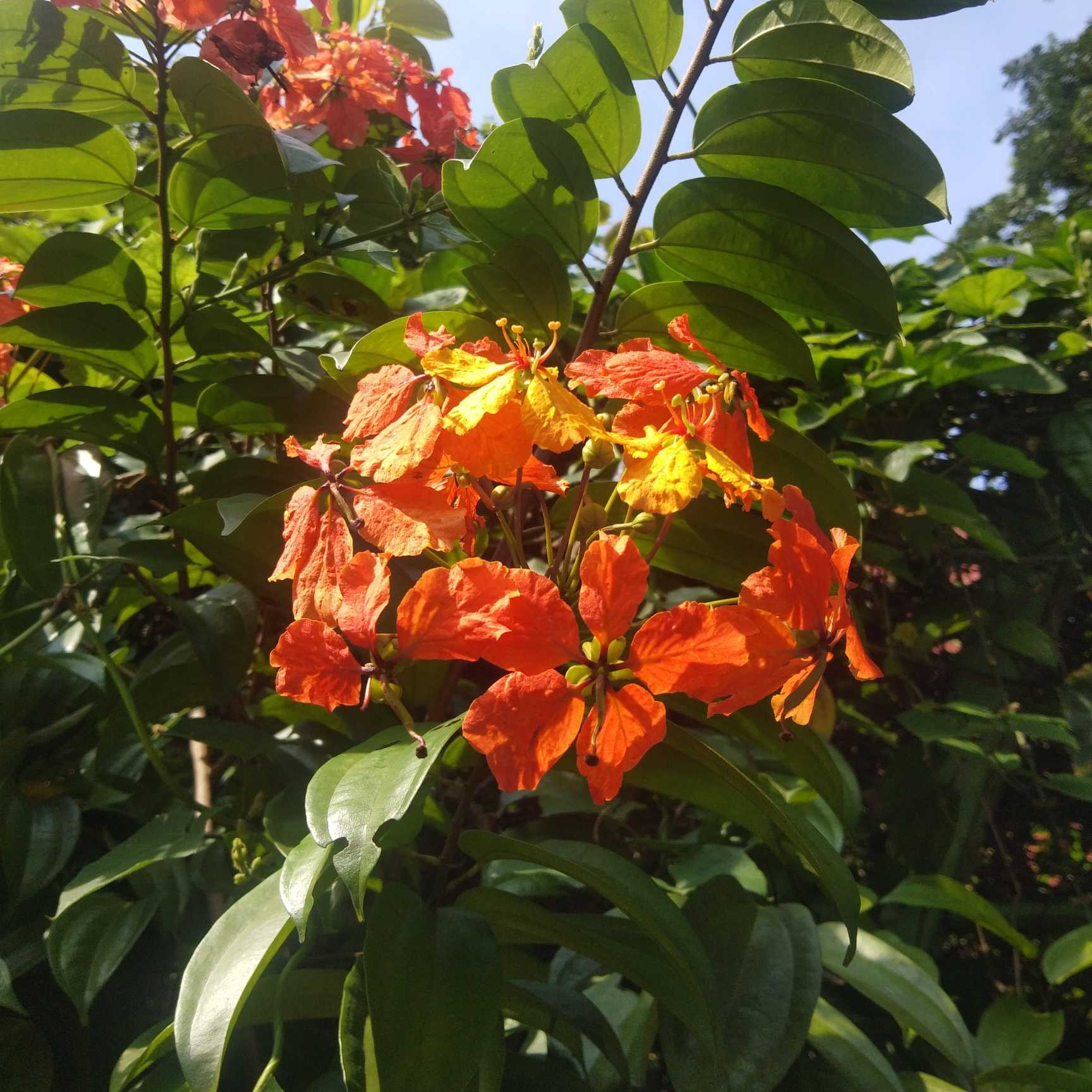
- Phanera coccinea

Scientific classification
- Kingdom: Plantae
- Clade: Tracheophytes
- Clade: Angiosperms
- Clade: Eudicots
- Clade: Rosids
- Order: Fabales
- Family: Fabaceae
- Subfamily: Cercidoideae
- Tribe: Bauhinieae
- Genus: Phanera; Lour.

Type species
- Phanera coccinea Lour.

Species
- 103 (in 2023); see text
- The range of Phanera

Synonyms
- Lasiobema (Korth.) Miq. (1855); Telestria Raf. (1838)

= Phanera =

Genus of legumes

Phanera is a genus of flowering plants in the legume subfamily Cercidoideae and the tribe Bauhinieae. This genus differs from Bauhinia in being vines or lianas, generally with tendrils and a lobed rather than spathaceous calyx, and from Schnella in having only three fertile stamens rather than ten, and being native to the Indomalayan realm and the Australasian realm rather than the Americas. The subsection Corymbosae was recently segregated into a new genus, Cheniella. It has been suggested that the genus Lasiobema should be reduced to a section within Phanera.

== Species ==
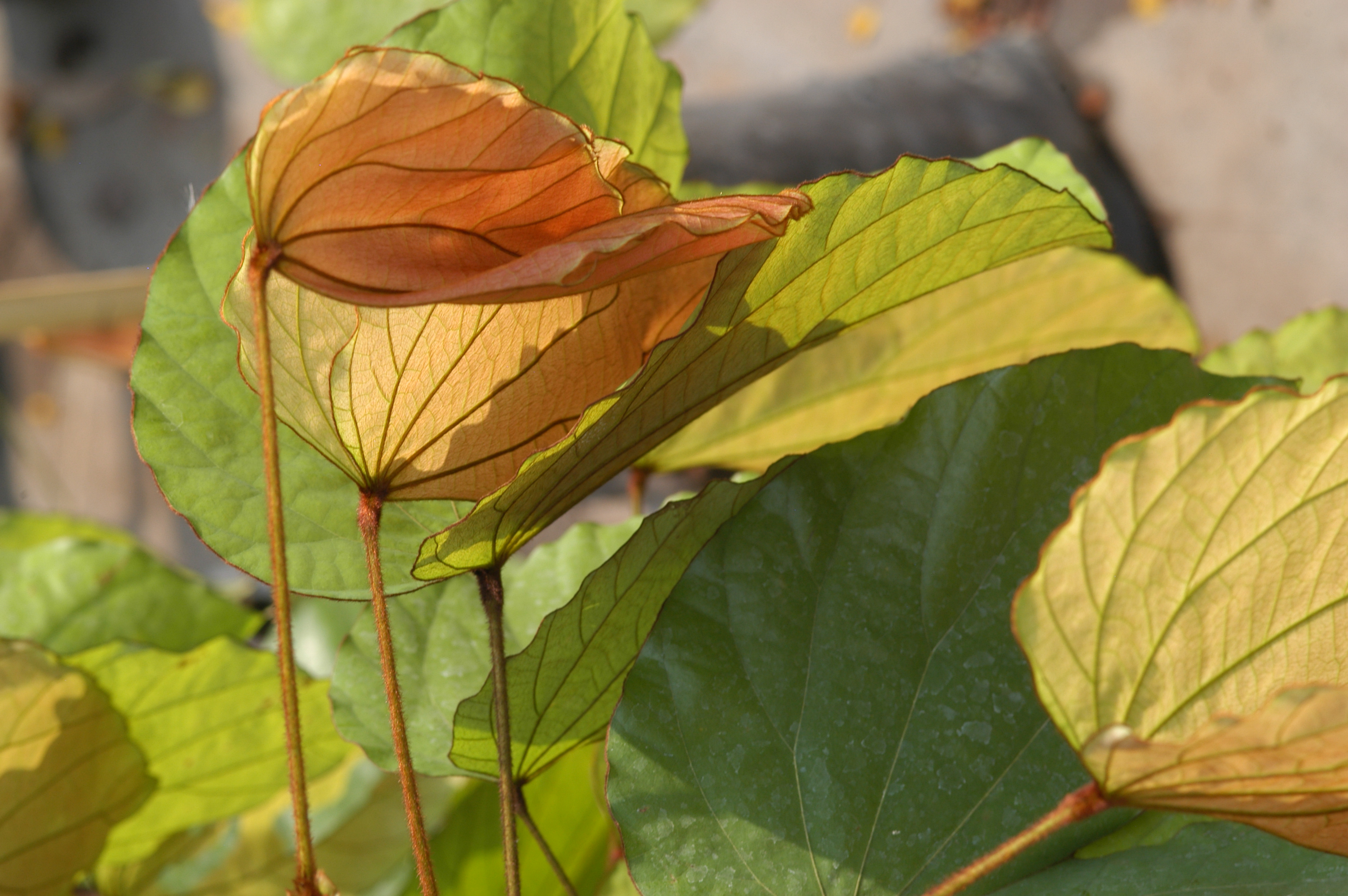
Phanera aureifolia

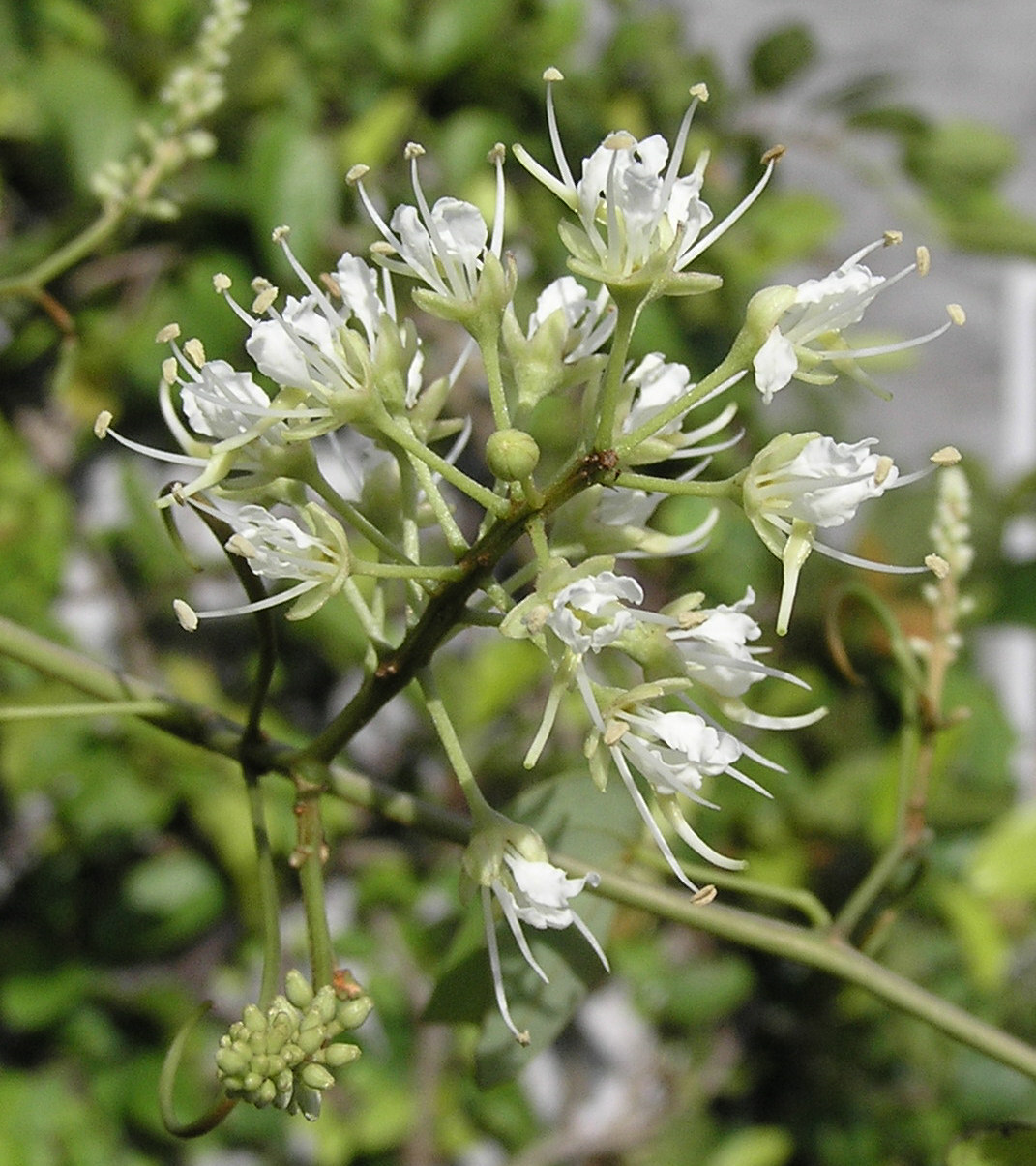
Phanera championii

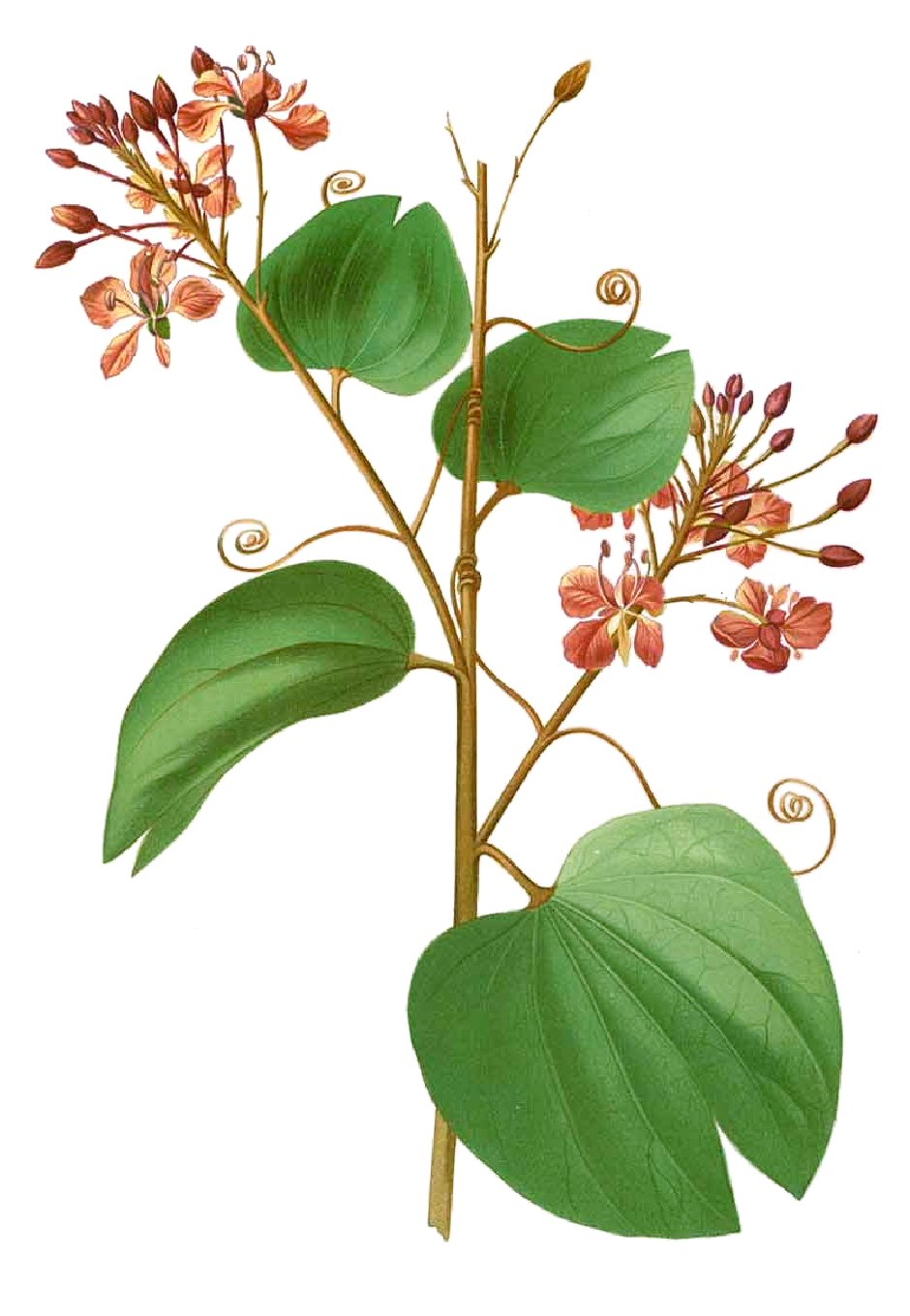
Phanera integrifolia subsp. cumingiana

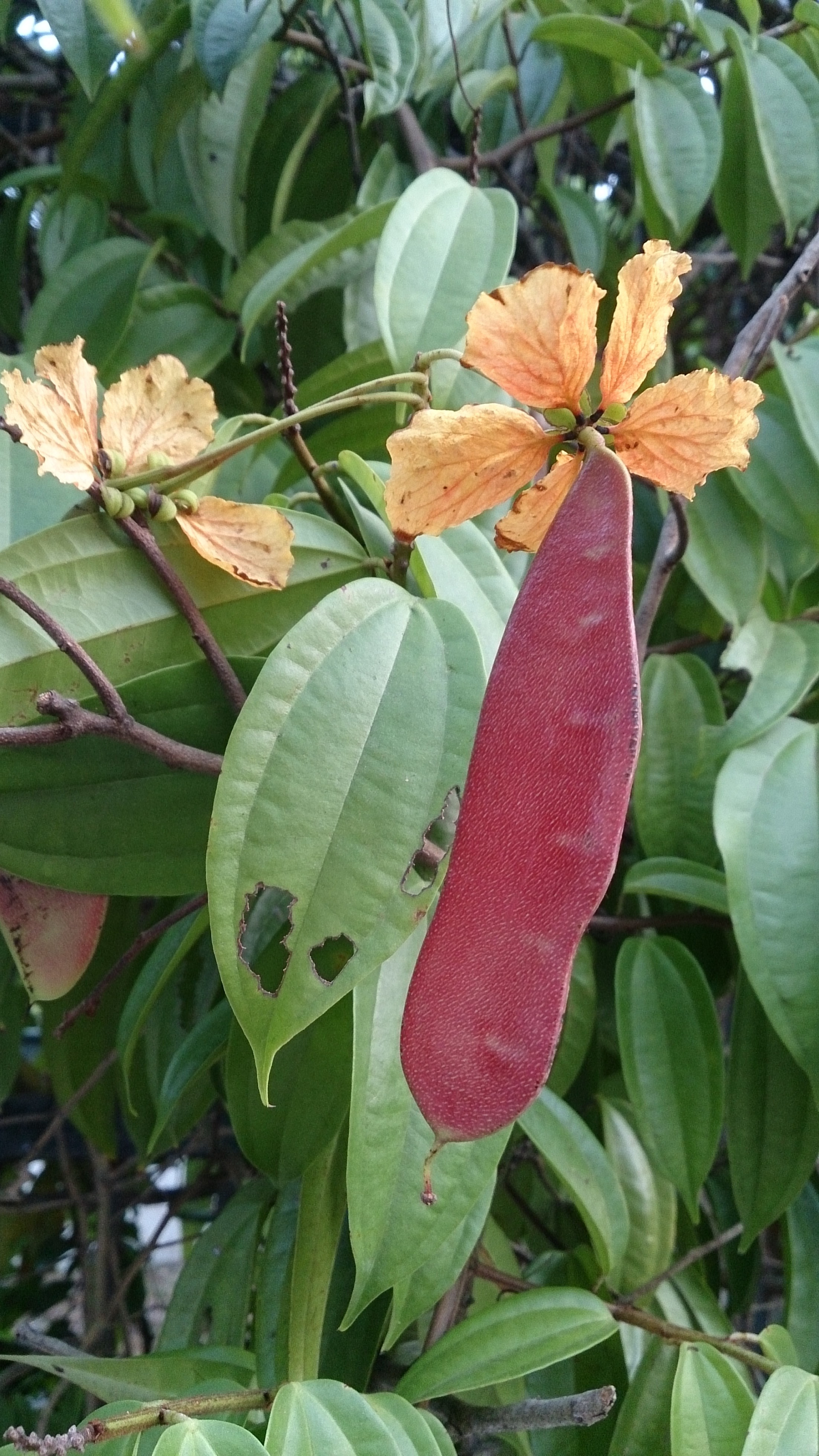
Phanera kockiana

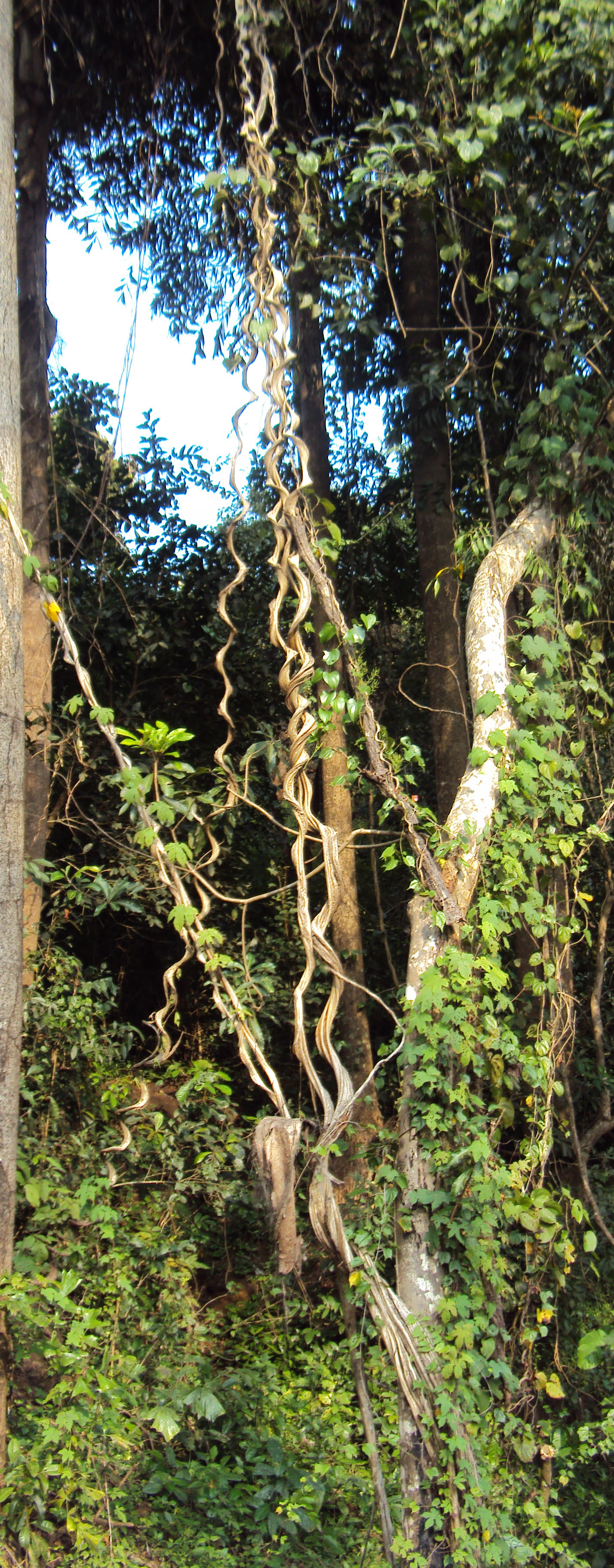
Phanera scandens

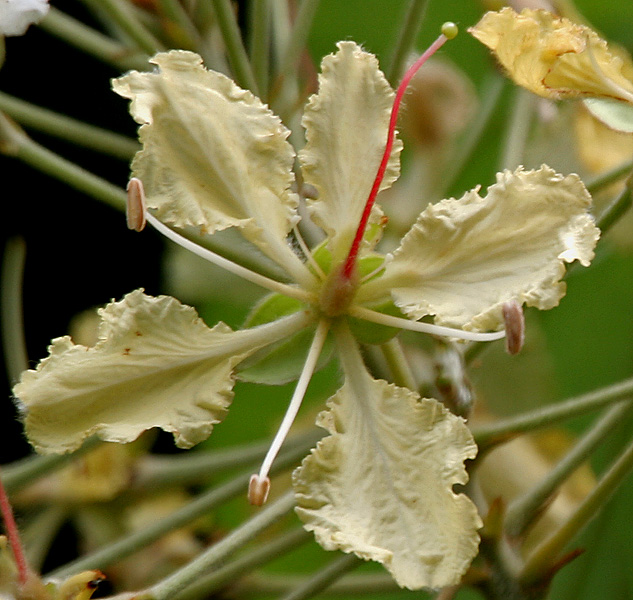
Phanera vahlii

As of September 2026, Phanera comprises the following species:

1. Phanera aherniana (Perkins) de Wit
  1. var. aherniana (Perkins) de Wit
  2. var. subglabra (Merr.) Bandyop., P.P. Goshal & M.K. Pathak
2. Phanera andersonii (K. Larsen & S.S. Larsen) Bandyop., P.P. Goshal & M.K. Pathak
3. Phanera apertilobata (Merr. & F.P.Metcalf) K.W.Jiang
4. Phanera argentea de Wit
5. Phanera audax de Wit
6. Phanera aurea (H. Lév.) Mackinder & R. Clark
7. Phanera aureifolia (K. Larsen & S.S. Larsen) Bandyop., P.P. Goshal & M.K. Pathak—Gold Leaf Bauhinia
8. Phanera bassacensis (Pierre ex Gagnep.) de Wit
  1. var. backeri de Wit
  2. var. bassacensis (Pierre ex Gagnep.) de Wit
9. Phanera bidentata (Jack) Benth.—Orange Bauhinia
  1. var. bidentata (Jack) Benth.
  2. var. breviflora (Ridl.) K. Larsen & S.S. Larsen
  3. var. cornifolia (Baker)Benn.
  4. var. fraseri (de Wit) K. Larsen & S.S. Larsen
  5. var. gracilipes (Merr.) K. Larsen & S.S. Larsen
  6. var. monticola (Ridl.) Bandyop., P.P. Ghoshal & M.K. Pathak
10. Phanera bohniana (H.Y.Chen) K.W.Jiang, S.R.Gu & T.Y.Tu
11. Phanera bracteata Benth.
  1. subsp. astylosa (K. Larsen & S.S. Larsen) Bandyop., P.P. Ghoshal & M.K. Pathak
  2. subsp. bracteata Graham ex Benth.
12. Phanera brevipedicellata (Jarvie) Mackinder & R. Clark
13. Phanera burbidgei (Stapf) Bandyop., P.P. Ghoshal & M.K. Pathak
14. Phanera calycina (Pierre ex Gagnep.) Bandyop. & Anand Kumar
15. Phanera calciphylla (D.X. Zhang & T.C. Chen) Mackinder & R. Clark
16. Phanera campanulata (S.S. Larsen) Bandyop., P.P. Ghoshal & M.K. Pathak
17. Phanera carcinophylla (Merr.) Mackinder & R. Clark
18. Phanera cardinalis (Pierre ex Gagnep.) Sinou & Bruneau
19. Phanera cercidifolia (D.X.Zhang) K.W.Jiang
20. Phanera chalcophylla (H.Y.Chen) Mackinder & R.Clark
21. Phanera championii Benth.
22. Phanera coccinea Lour.
23. Phanera concreta (Craib) Sinou & Bruneau
24. Phanera crudiantha de Wit
25. Phanera comosa (Craib) Bandyop. & Ghoshal
26. Phanera cuprea (Ridl.) de Wit
27. Phanera curtisii (Prain) Bandyop. & Ghoshal
28. Phanera decumbens (Henderson) de Wit
29. Phanera delavayi (Franch.) Sinou & Bruneau
30. Phanera elmeri (Merr.) de Wit
31. Phanera erythropoda (Hayata) Mackinder & R. Clark
  1. var. erythropoda (Hayata) Mackinder & R. Clark
  2. var. guangxiensis (D.X. Zhang & T.C. Chen) Mackinder & R. Clark
32. Phanera esquirolii (Gagnep.) Sinou & Bruneau
33. Phanera excelsa Miq.
  1. var. aurora de Wit
  2. var. excelsa Miq.
34. Phanera excurrens (Stapf) Bandyop., P.P. Ghoshal & M.K. Pathak
35. Phanera fabrilis (de Wit) Bandyop., P.P. Ghoshal & M.K. Pathak
36. Phanera ferruginea (Roxb.) Benth.
  1. var. ferruginea (Roxb.) Benth.
  2. var. griffithiana (Benth.) Bandyop., P.P. Ghoshal & M.K. Pathak
37. Phanera finlaysoniana Benth.
  1. var. amoena de Wit
  2. var. finlaysoniana Benth.
  3. var. leptopus (Perkins) K. Larsen & S.S. Larsen
  4. var. montana de Wit
38. Phanera flava (de Wit) Bandyop. & Ghoshal
39. Phanera foraminifera (Gagnep.) de Wit
40. Phanera franckii (K. Larsen & S.S. Larsen) Bandyop., P.P. Ghoshal & M.K. Pathak
41. Phanera fulva (Korth.) Benth.
42. Phanera glabrifolia Benth.
  1. var. glabrifolia Benth.
  2. var. maritima (K. Larsen & S.S. Larsen) Bandyop.
  3. var. sericea (Lace) Bandyop.
43. Phanera glabristipes de Wit
44. Phanera gracillima de Wit
45. Phanera guangxiensis (D.X.Zhang & T.C.Chen) X.Peng, K.W.Jiang & T.Y.Tu
46. Phanera hainanensis (Merr. & Chun ex H.Y.Chen) K.W.Jiang, S.R.Gu & T.Y.Tu
47. Phanera harmsiana (Hosseus) Bandyop. & Ghoshal
48. Phanera hekouensis (T.Y.Tu & D.X.Zhang) Krishnaraj
49. Phanera hendersonii de Wit
50. Phanera htamanthiensis R.Clark & K.Armstr.
51. Phanera hypochrysa (T.C. Chen) Mackinder & R. Clark
52. Phanera hypoglauca (Tang & F.T.Wang ex T.C.Chen) K.W.Jiang
53. Phanera integrifolia (Roxb.) Benth.
  1. subsp. cumingiana (Benth.) de Wit
    1. var. cumingiana (Benth.) de Wit
    2. var. nymphaeifolia Mackinder & R. Clark
  2. subsp. integrifolia (Roxb.) Benth.
54. Phanera involucellata (Kurz) de Wit
55. Phanera involucrans (Gagnep.) Tak.Yamam.
56. Phanera japonica (Maxim.) H.Ohashi
57. Phanera khasiana (Baker) Thoth.
58. Phanera kingii (Prain) Bandyop., P.P. Ghoshal & M.K. Pathak
59. Phanera kockiana (Korth.) Benth.
60. Phanera kostermansii (K.Larsen & S.S.Larsen) Bandyop., Ghoshal & M.K.Pathak
61. Phanera lambiana (Baker f.) de Wit
62. Phanera laotica Mattapha & Lanors.
63. Phanera larseniana Chantar., Mattapha & Wangwasit
64. Phanera lingua (DC.) Miq.
  1. var. antipolana (Perkins) Bandyop., P.P. Ghoshal & M.K. Pathak
  2. var. lingua (DC.) Miq.
  3. var. riedelii (Baker) Bandyop., P.P. Ghoshal & M.K. Pathak
65. Phanera lingyuenensis (T.C.Chen) K.W.Jiang
66. Phanera longistipes (T.C.Chen) K.W.Jiang
67. Phanera lorantha (Pierre ex Gagnep.) Bandyop. & Anand Kumar
68. Phanera lucida Miq.
69. Phanera lyrata (Raizada) Thoth.
70. Phanera macrostachya Benth. (synonym Phanera wallichii)
71. Phanera meeboldii (Craib) Thoth.
72. Phanera mekongensis Mattapha, Suddee & Duangjai
73. Phanera menispermacea (Gagnep.) de Wit
74. Phanera merrilliana (Perkins) de Wit
  1. var. borneensis (K. Larsen & S.S. Larsen) Bandyop., P.P. Ghoshal & M.K. Pathak
  2. var. merrilliana (Perkins) de Wit
75. Phanera murthyi Vadhyar & J.H.F.Benj.
76. Phanera nakhonphanomensis (Chatan) Mackinder & R. Clark
77. Phanera nervosa Benth.
78. Phanera ornata (Kurz) Thoth.
79. Phanera oxysepala (Gagnep.) Bandyop. & Anand Kumar
80. Phanera pachyphylla (Merr.) de Wit
  1. var. pachyphylla (Merr.) de Wit
  2. var. wenzelii (K. Larsen & S.S. Larsen) Bandyop., P.P. Ghoshal & M.K. Pathak
81. Phanera pauciflora (Merr.) de Wit
82. Phanera paucinervata (T.C. Chen) Mackinder & R. Clark
83. Phanera penicilliloba (Pierre ex Gagnep.) Sinou & Bruneau
84. Phanera posthumi de Wit
85. Phanera pottingeri (Prain) Thoth.
86. Phanera praesignis (Ridl.) de Wit
87. Phanera pulla (Craib) Sinou & Bruneau
88. Phanera pyrrhoclada (Drake) de Wit
89. Phanera pyrrhoneura (Korth.) Benth.
90. Phanera ridleyi (Prain) A.Schmitz
91. Phanera roseoalba Tak.Yamam., Tagane & Soulad.
92. Phanera roxburghiana (Voigt) Bandyop., Anand Kumar & Chakrab.
93. Phanera rubra Lanors. & Mattapha
94. Phanera rubrovillosa (K. Larsen & S.S. Larsen) Mackinder & R. Clark (or P. rubro-villosa)
95. Phanera saigonensis (Pierre ex Gagnep.) Mackinder & R. Clark
96. Phanera scandens (L.) Lour. ex Raf.
97. Phanera semibifida (Roxb.) Benth.
  1. var. acuminata (K. Larsen & S.S. Larsen) Bandyop., P.P. Ghoshal & M.K. Pathak
  2. var. bruneiana (K. Larsen & S.S. Larsen) Bandyop., P.P. Ghoshal & M.K. Pathak
  3. var. longebracteata (K. Larsen & S.S. Larsen) Bandyop., P.P. Ghoshal & M.K. Pathak
  4. var. perkinsiae (Roxb.) Benth.
  5. var. semibifida (Merr.) Bandyop., P.P.Ghoshal & M.K.Pathak
  6. var. stenostachya (Baker) de Wit
98. Phanera siamensis (K. Larsen & S.S. Larsen) Mackinder & R. Clark
99. Phanera similis (Craib) de Wit
100. Phanera sirindhorniae (K. Larsen & S.S. Larsen) Mackinder & R. Clark
101. Phanera steenisii (K.Larsen & S.S.Larsen) Bandyop., Ghoshal & M.K.Pathak
102. Phanera stipularis (Korth.) Benth.
  1. var. brachystylus (K. Larsen & S.S. Larsen) Bandyop., P.P. Ghoshal & M.K. Pathak
  2. var. stipularis (Korth.) Benth.
103. Phanera strychnifolia (Craib) K.W.Jiang, S.R.Gu & T.Y.Tu
104. Phanera strychnoidea (Prain) Bandyop. & Ghoshal
105. Phanera sulphurea (C.E.C. Fischer) Thoth.
106. Phanera sylvani de Wit
107. Phanera tubicalyx (Craib) Bandyop. & Ghoshal
108. Phanera vahlii (Wight & Arn.) Benth.
109. Phanera venustula (T.C.Chen) K.W.Jiang
110. Phanera williamsii (F. Muell.) de Wit
111. Phanera wrayi (Prain) de Wit
  1. var. blumeana (K. Larsen & S.S. Larsen) Bandyop., P.P. Ghoshal & M.K. Pathak
  2. var. borneensis (K. Larsen & S.S. Larsen) Bandyop., P.P. Ghoshal & M.K. Pathak
  3. var. cancellata (Ridl.) de Wit
  4. var. cardiophylla (Merr.) Bandyop., P.P. Ghoshal & M.K. Pathak
  5. var. moultonii (Merr.) Bandyop., P.P. Ghoshal & M.K. Pathak
  6. var. rubella de Wit
  7. var. wrayi (Prain) de Wit
112. Phanera wuzhengyii (S.S. Larsen) Bandyop., P.P. Ghoshal & M.K. Pathak
113. Phanera yunnanensis (Franch.) Wunderlin
