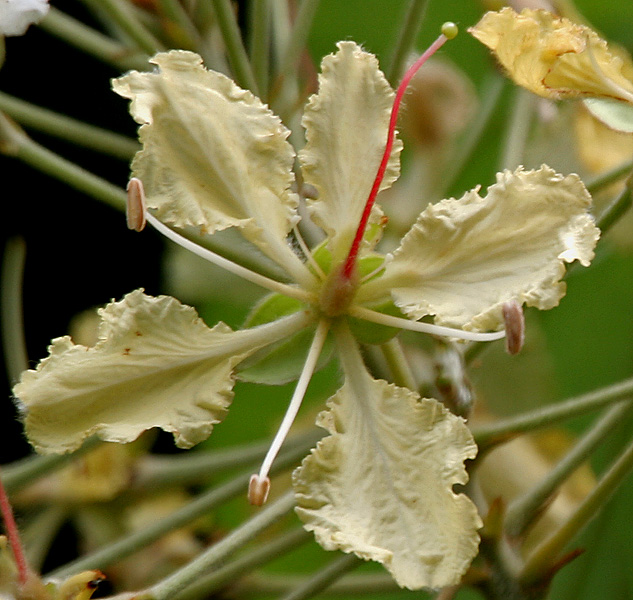
- Flower in Ananthagiri Hills, in Ranga Reddy district of Andhra Pradesh, India

Scientific classification
- Kingdom: Plantae
- Clade: Embryophytes
- Clade: Tracheophytes
- Clade: Spermatophytes
- Clade: Angiosperms
- Clade: Eudicots
- Clade: Rosids
- Order: Fabales
- Family: Fabaceae
- Genus: Phanera
- Species: P. vahlii

Binomial name
- Phanera vahlii (Wight & Arn., 1834) Benth.

Synonyms
- Bauhinia racemosa Vahl; Bauhinia vahlii Wight & Arn.

= Phanera vahlii =

Species of legume

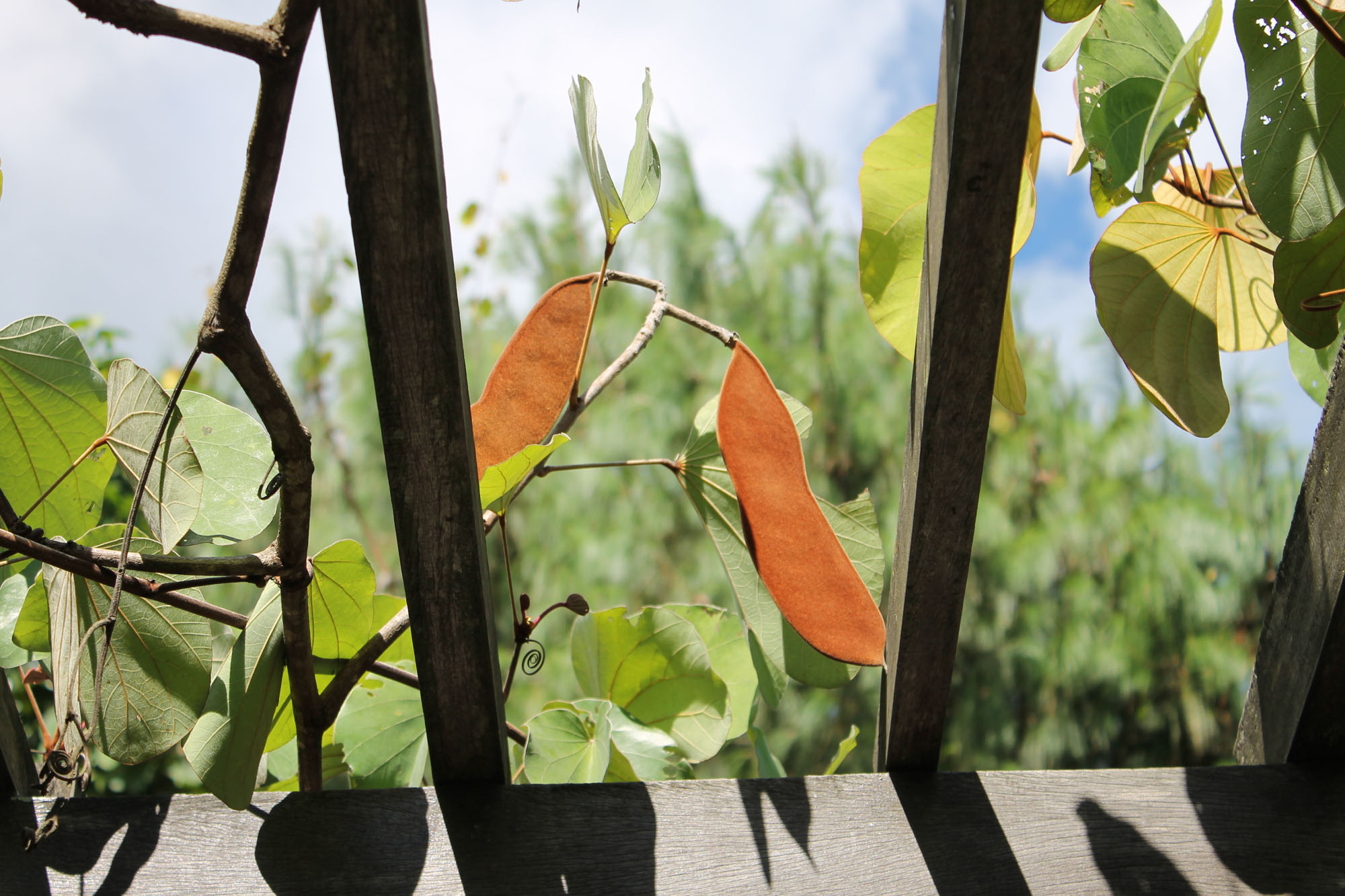
Pods of Phanera vahlii in Mathurapati Fulbari VDC Nepal

Phanera vahlii is a perennial creeper (liana) of the family Fabaceae native to the northern and central Indian subcontinent. It can grow as much as 15 metres (49 ft) a year toward an eventual 30 m (98 ft) long, with a stem up to 20 cm (7.9 in) thick. The leaves are two-lobed, up to 46 cm (18 in) long, and almost as wide. The stems and petioles are covered with reddish hair (trichomes).

The roasted seeds of this woody climber are edible.

The flowers are 2–3 cm diameter, white, fading to yellow with age, and have three fertile stamens and seven staminodes. The fruit is a pod 20–30 cm long.

== Distribution ==
Phanera vahlii is found in the Himalaya from Sikkim and Nepal across India and Himachal Pradesh and Punjab, Pakistan and south to the Mumbai and Chennai areas and Chhattisgarh, Jharkhand and Odisha in the middle and eastern part of India. It grows at altitudes up to 1,500 m (4,900 ft) altitude.

== Local names ==
In Hindi, it is called मालू malu, but also mahul, jallaur and jallur. In Nepali it is called भोर्ला bhorla. In Odia, it is called ସିଆଳି Siali, இலை மந்தாரை in Tamil, and Rúṅ in Ho. In Telugu, it is called అడ్డాకు. In Lepcha it is called bor laa rik,In Santali it is called ᱞᱟᱲ-Lar" a gigantic climber found in lower and middle hill forest up to 1200 m altitude, seeds and leaves have medicinal properties for impotency".
