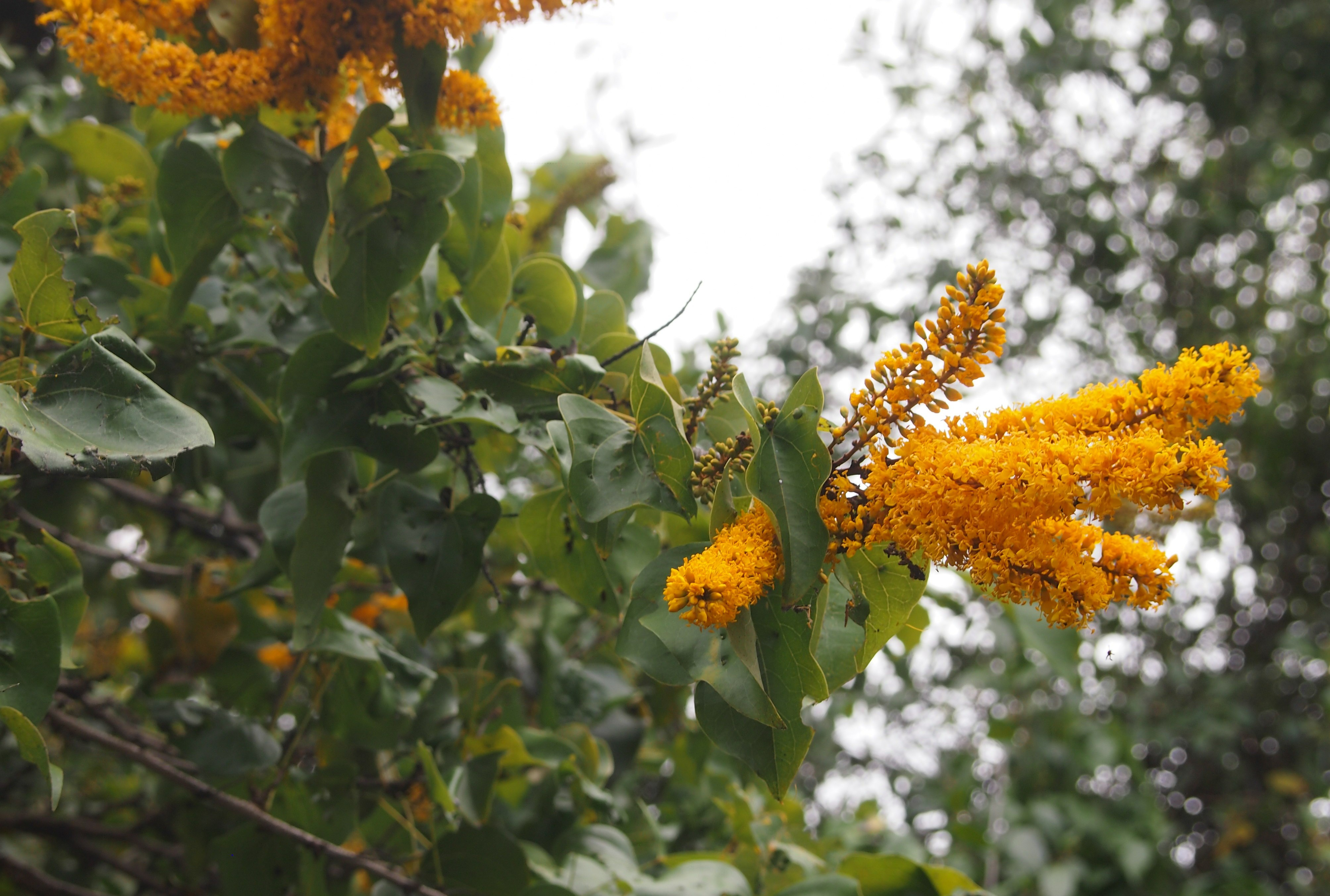
- Flowers

Scientific classification
- Kingdom: Plantae
- Clade: Tracheophytes
- Clade: Angiosperms
- Clade: Eudicots
- Clade: Rosids
- Order: Fabales
- Family: Fabaceae
- Subfamily: Cercidoideae
- Tribe: Bauhinieae
- Genus: Barklya; F.Muell.
- Species: B. syringifolia

Binomial name
- Barklya syringifolia F.Muell.

Synonyms
- Bauhinia syringifolia (F.Muell.) Wunderlin

= Barklya =

Genus of legumes

Barklya is a genus of Australian trees in the legume family, Fabaceae. It belongs to the subfamily Cercidoideae. The sole species is Barklya syringifolia, commonly known as golden crown or golden glory. It grows in rainforest to 20 metres tall, and occurs in Queensland and New South Wales. It is often used as an ornamental.

The species was formally described in 1859 by Victorian Government Botanist Ferdinand von Mueller and named after Henry Barkly. Mueller's description was based on plant material collected by the superintendent of the Brisbane Botanic Gardens, Walter Hill, in the vicinity of Pine River to the north of Brisbane.

== Gallery ==
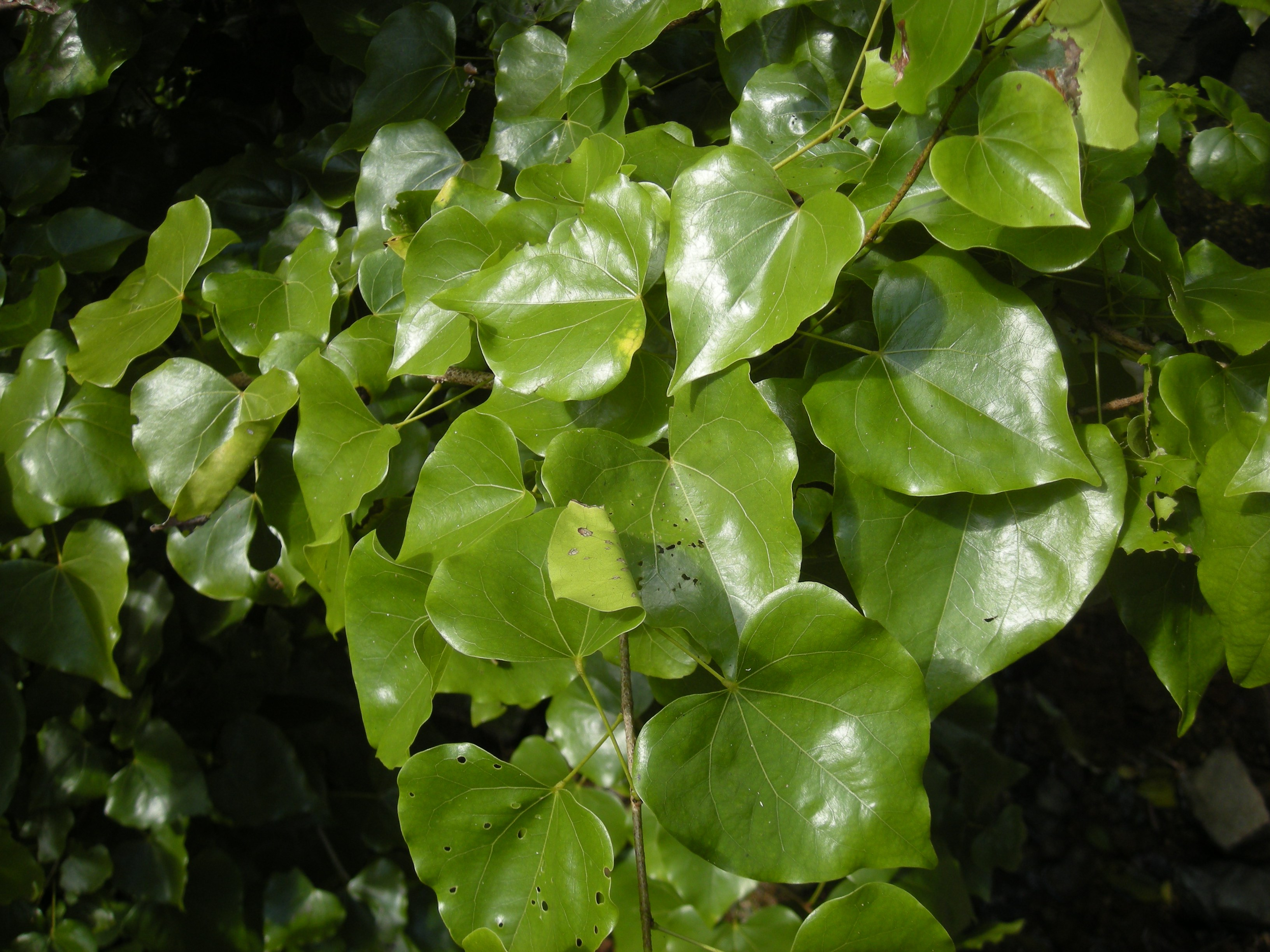
B. syringifolia foliage

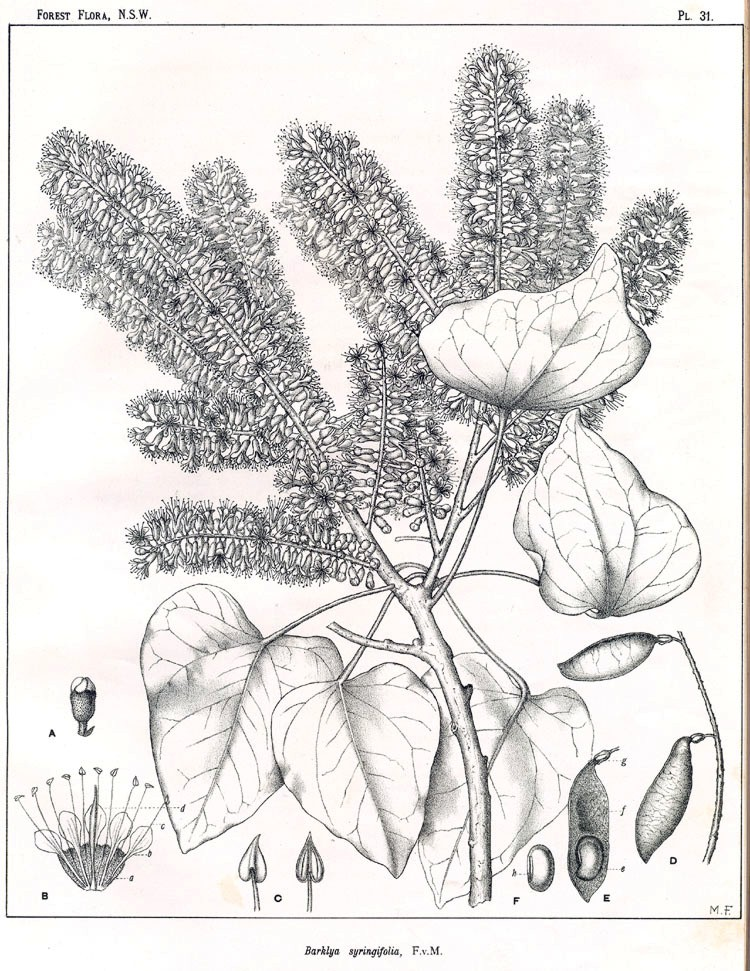
Illustration by Margaret Flockton
