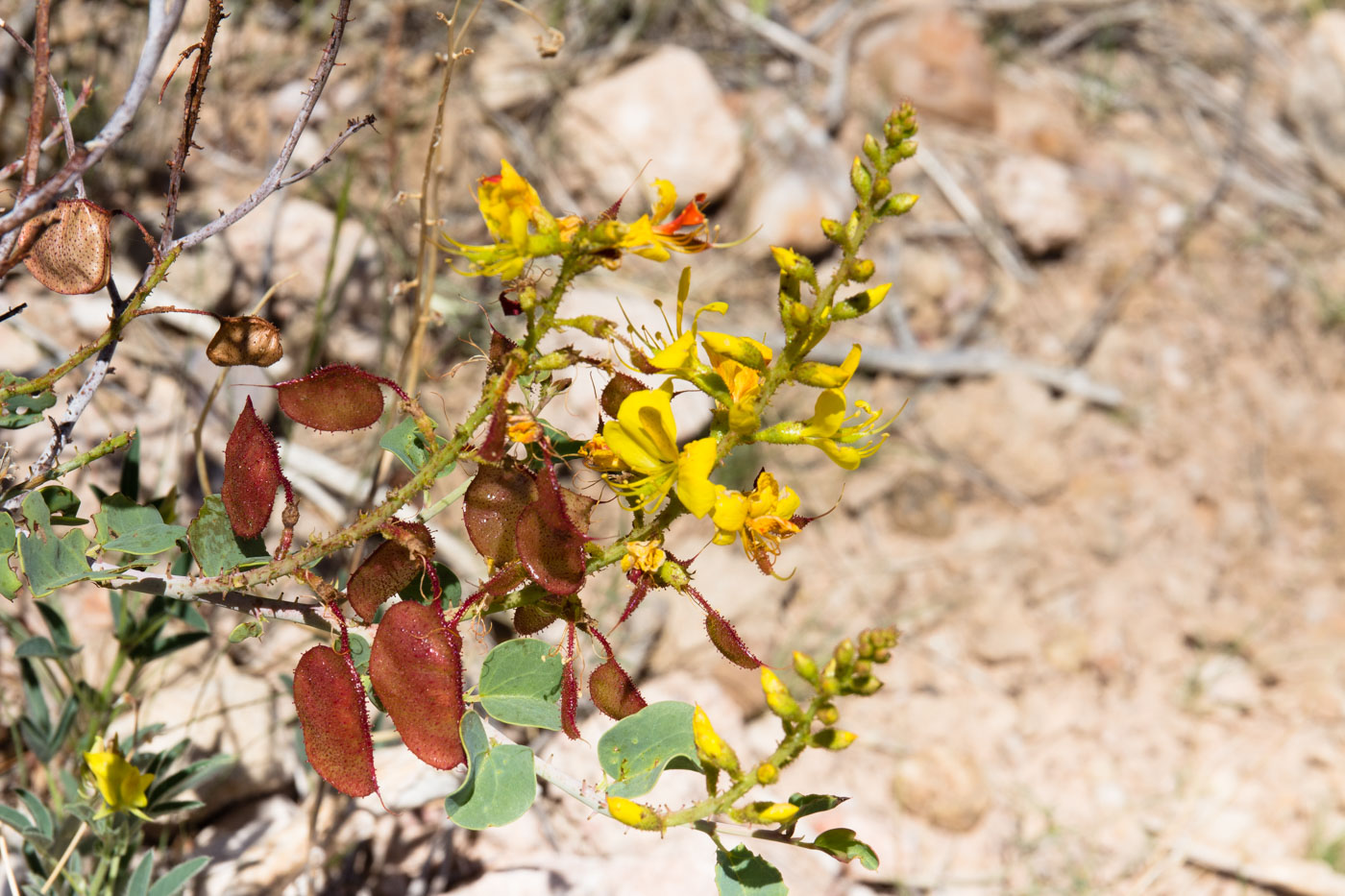
- Adenolobus pechuelii

Scientific classification
- Kingdom: Plantae
- Clade: Tracheophytes
- Clade: Angiosperms
- Clade: Eudicots
- Clade: Rosids
- Order: Fabales
- Family: Fabaceae
- Subfamily: Cercidoideae
- Genus: Adenolobus (Harv. ex Benth.) Torre & Hillc.

Type species
- Adenolobus garipensis (E. Mey.) Torre & Hillc.

Species
- 2; see text.

= Adenolobus =

Genus of legumes

Adenolobus is a genus of African flowering plants in the legume family, Fabaceae. It belongs to the subfamily Cercidoideae.

== Species ==
Adenolobus comprises the following species:

Flowers	Plant	Scientific name
		Adenolobus garipensis (E. Mey.) Torre & Hillc.
		Adenolobus pechuelii (Kuntze) Torre & Hillc.
