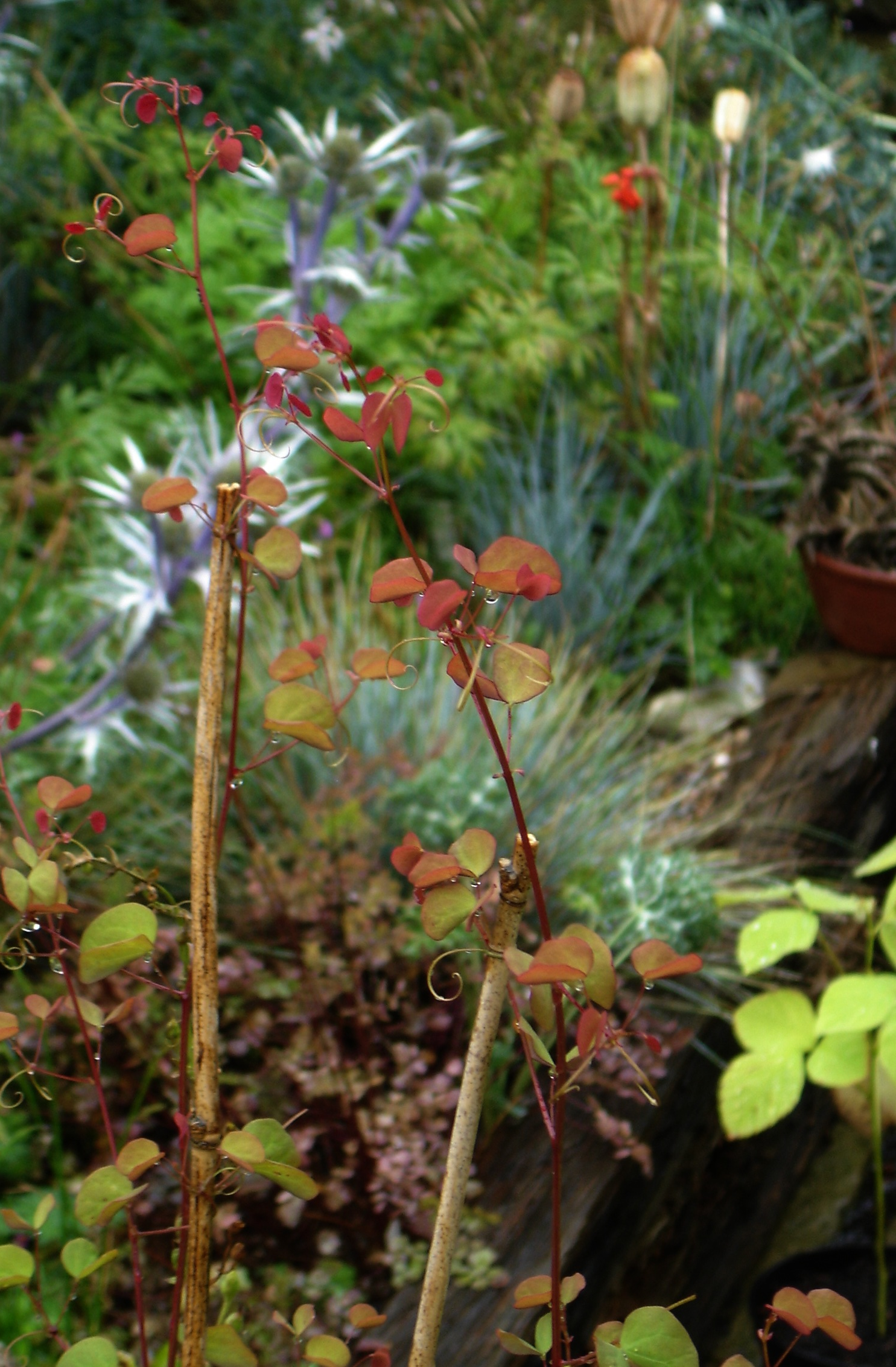

Scientific classification
- Kingdom: Plantae
- Clade: Tracheophytes
- Clade: Angiosperms
- Clade: Eudicots
- Clade: Rosids
- Order: Fabales
- Family: Fabaceae
- Genus: Phanera
- Species: P. yunnanensis

Binomial name
- Phanera yunnanensis (Franch.) Wunderlin

Synonyms
- Bauhinia yunnanensis Franch.; Bauhinia altefissa H.Lev.; Bauhinia altifissa H.Lev., p.p.A; Bauhinia collettii Prain; Bauhinia diptera Collett & Hemsl.; Bauhinia mirabilis Merr.; Bracteolanthus dipterus (Miq.) de Wit; Lasiobema yunnanense (Franch.) A.Schmitz; Phanera collettii (Prain) Thoth.; Phanera diptera (Miq.) Miq.

= Phanera yunnanensis =

Species of plant

Phanera yunnanensis (taxonomic synonym Bauhinia yunnanensis) is a plant with the common names Chinese orchid tree, Yunnan orchid or orchid vine, native to China (Sichuan, Yunnan, Guizhou) and W. Indochina. It is a perennial dicot described as a shrub or vine. It is in the Fabaceae family, has orchid-like flowers and has been introduced to Florida, in the USA.
