= Bauhcis =

Bauhcis Temporal range: Oligocene

Scientific classification
- Kingdom: Plantae
- (unranked): Angiosperms
- (unranked): Eudicots
- (unranked): Rosids
- Order: Fabales
- Family: Fabaceae
- Subfamily: Cercidoideae
- Tribe: incertae sedis
- Genus: †Bauhcis Calvillo-Canadell & Cevallos-Ferriz
- Species: †B. moranii

Binomial name
- Bauhcis moranii Calvillo-Canadell & Cevallos-Ferriz

Extinct genus of flowering plant from Mexico

Bauhcis is an extinct genus of fossil plants within the legume family Fabaceae. The only species is Bauhcis moranii. It was first described in 2002 by Calvillo-Canadell and Cevallos-Ferriz based on fossil specimens from the Oligocene period found in Tepexi de Rodríguez, Puebla, Mexico.

== History ==
Bauhcis moranii is an extinct species of dicotyledonous fossil flowering plant in the family Fabaceae and subfamily Caesalpinioideae, native to central Mexico. This species was described in 2002 from two leaf impressions found in the Coatzingo Formation, an Oligocene geological formation located near Tepexi de Rodríguez (Puebla).

Morphological studies, confirmed by principal component analysis (PCA), as well as a cladistic study using the Hennig86 program, show that this fossil can be confidently classified within the tribe Cercideae and that it occupies an intermediate position between the genus Cercis and certain species of the genus Bauhinia.

== Etymology ==
The generic name, "Bauhcis," is a combination of the generic names Bauhinia and Cercis, indicating that the leaf characteristics of these two genera are found in a mosaic form in the fossil material.The specific epithet, "moranii," is a tribute to Dante Jaime Morán-Zenteno, director (1994-2002) of the Institute of Geology in Mexico City, for his unconditional support of paleobotany.
