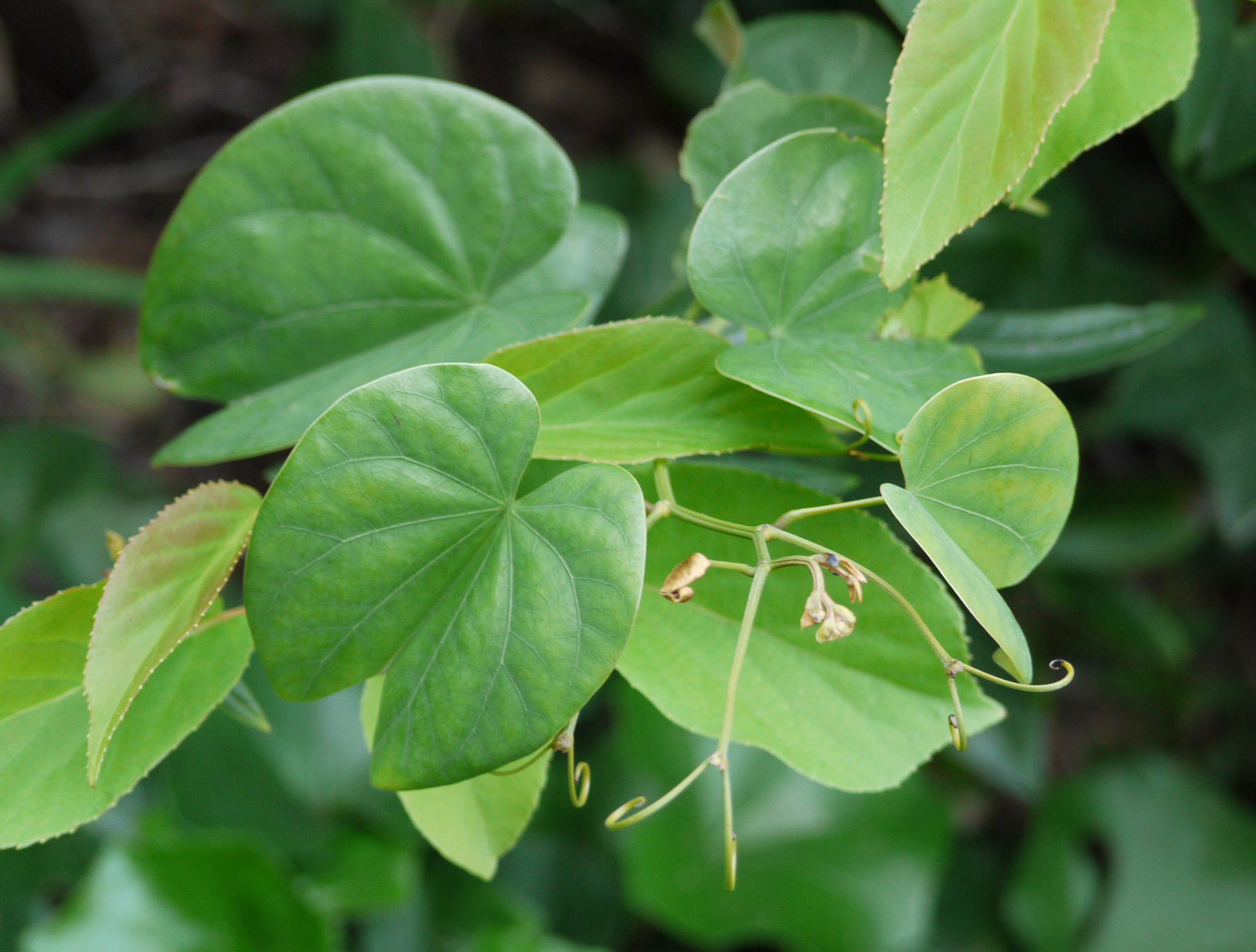
- Phanera japonica leaves

Scientific classification
- Kingdom: Plantae
- Clade: Embryophytes
- Clade: Tracheophytes
- Clade: Spermatophytes
- Clade: Angiosperms
- Clade: Eudicots
- Clade: Rosids
- Order: Fabales
- Family: Fabaceae
- Genus: Phanera
- Species: P. japonica

Binomial name
- Phanera japonica (Maxim.) H.Ohashi

Synonyms
- Bauhinia japonica Maxim.; Lasiobema japonicum (Maxim.) de Wit; Bauhinia kwangtungensis Merr.

= Phanera japonica =

Species of legume

Phanera japonica (Chinese: 日本羊蹄甲; pinyin: ri ben yang ti jia) is a species of flowering plant in the family Fabaceae which can be found in Guangdong, Hainan and Japan.

== Description ==
The species petioles are 3–4 centimetres (1.2–1.6 in) long while the margins are papery, yellow in colour, and are 4–9 centimetres (1.6–3.5 in) long. Its legume is oblong, swollen and is 2–2.8 centimetres (0.79–1.10 in) long. The leaf blade surface is shiny and hairless. The raceme is 10–23 centimetres (3.9–9.1 in) with many flowers. Its bracteole is linear, 1 millimetre (0.039 in) long, and have 10–20 millimetres (0.39–0.79 in) long pedicels which are slender as well. Its receptacle is broadly funneled and is 1.5–2 millimetres (0.059–0.079 in) long. Petals are green in colour, are either obovate or oblong, and are 4.5 millimetres (0.18 in) long while its claw is 2.5 millimetres (0.098 in). The species have three fertile stamens which are 11 millimetres (0.43 in) long and glabrous while the staminodes are two in number with silky hairs. The seeds are black coloured and are shiny, ensiform, and 7 millimetres (0.28 in) long. The flowers bloom from January to May while the fruits ripe from June to September.
