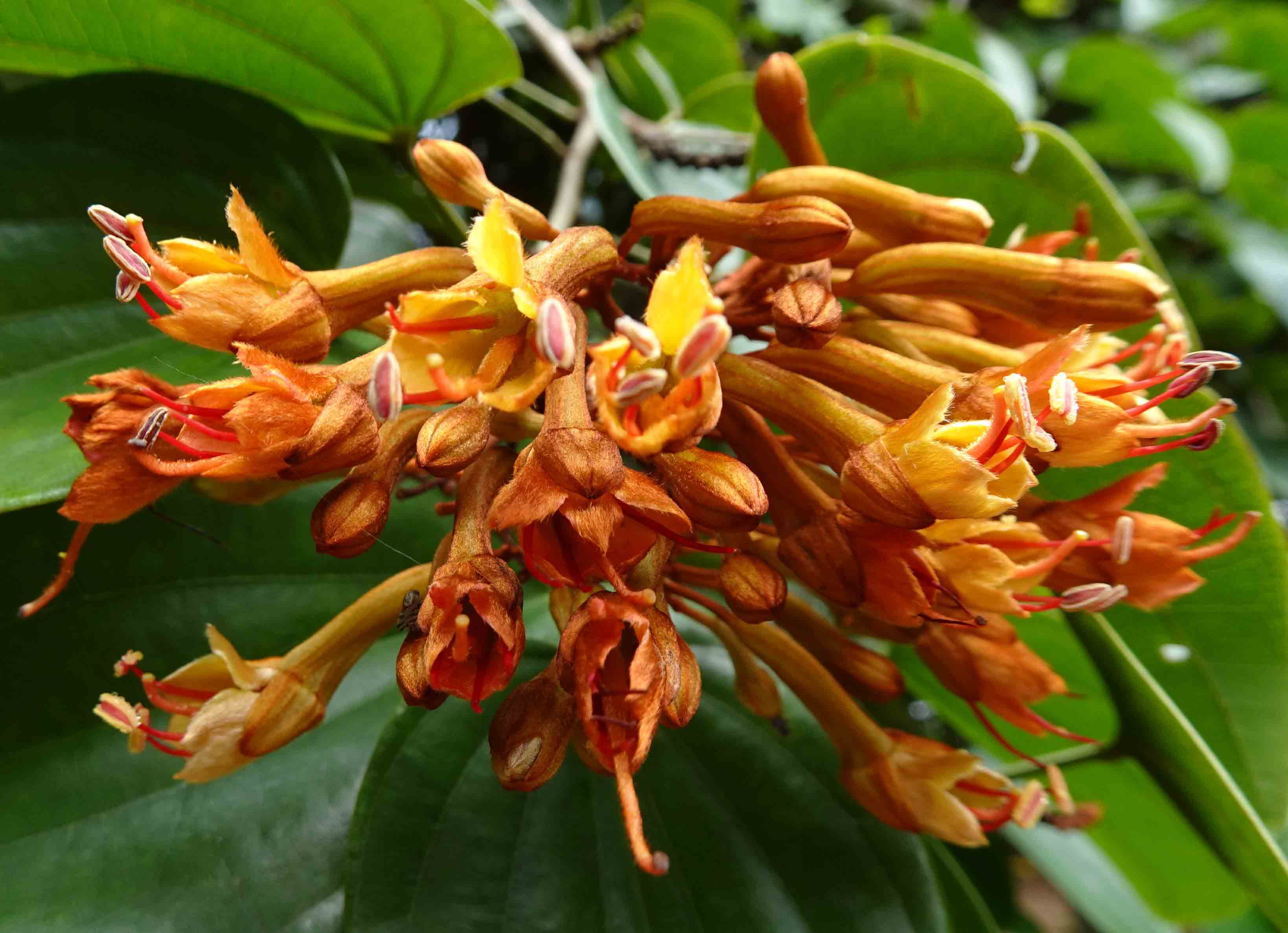

Scientific classification
- Kingdom: Plantae
- Clade: Tracheophytes
- Clade: Angiosperms
- Clade: Eudicots
- Clade: Rosids
- Order: Fabales
- Family: Fabaceae
- Genus: Phanera
- Species: P. sirindhorniae

Binomial name
- Phanera sirindhorniae (K.Larsen & S.S.Larsen) Mackinder & R.Clark

Synonyms
- Bauhinia sirindhorniae K.Larsen & S.S.Larsen

= Phanera sirindhorniae =

Species of flowering plant

Phanera sirindhorniae is a species of flowering plant in the family Fabaceae. The species was originally published as Bauhinia sirindhorniae in 1997. It is a liana with orange flowers. The species is endemic to Thailand, and was named for the Thai royal Sirindhorn.

== Distribution ==
The species is endemic to Thailand, and native to the tropical biome of its north-eastern region.

== Taxonomy ==
The species was originally named by Kai Larsen and Supee Saksuwan Larsen in 1997, under the name Bauhinia sirindhorniae. In 2014, the species was moved from the genus Bauhinia to the genus Phanera, becoming Phanera sirindhorniae.

== Description ==
Phanera sirindhorniae is a tendrilled liana, which grows to 10–20 metres (33–66 ft) long. Young branches are reddish-brown and hairy, while older branches are smooth. The leaves are leathery in texture, and ovate in shape. Leaves are 17–18 centimetres (6.7–7.1 in) long, and 4–5 centimetres (1.6–2.0 in) wide. The leaf stalks are 2–6.5 centimetres (0.79–2.56 in) long. The flower buds are reddish-brown, and ovate in shape. The flowers are yellowish and orange-red. The fruit is rust-coloured. The seeds are flat and dark brown.

== Etymology ==
The species is named for Sirindhorn, a member of Thailand's royal family, in recognition of her work on nature conservation in Thailand.
