= Brenierea =

Conservation status
- Least Concern (IUCN 3.1)

Scientific classification
- Kingdom: Plantae
- Clade: Tracheophytes
- Clade: Angiosperms
- Clade: Eudicots
- Clade: Rosids
- Order: Fabales
- Family: Fabaceae
- Subfamily: Cercidoideae
- Genus: Brenierea; Humbert (1959)
- Species: B. insignis

Binomial name
- Brenierea insignis Humbert (1959)

Genus of legumes

Brenierea insignis is a species of flowering plants in the legume family, Fabaceae. It belongs to the subfamily Cercidoideae and is the only member of the genus Brenierea. It is endemic to Madagascar.

Brenierea insignis is a shrub or small tree which grows 6 to 8 meters tall. It is endemic to the arid south and southwest of Madagascar, where it grows in deciduous spiny thicket on calcareous or silicaceous soil from sea level up to 300 meters elevation.

The tree is subject to habitat loss and fragmentation from human-caused fires and forest clearance for livestock grazing, agriculture, and firewood.
