= Mathurapati Fulbari =

Mathurapati Phulbari मथुरापाटी फूलबारी
- Village development committee
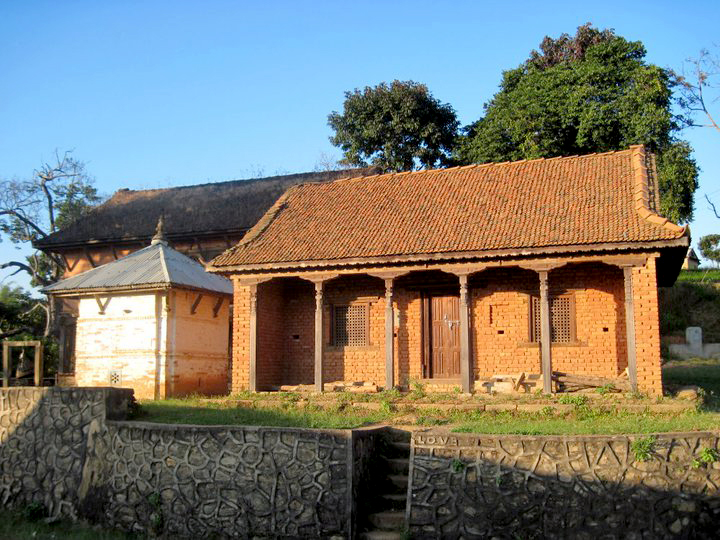
- Mathurapati (a inn), after which the VDC was named.

- Location in Nepal
- Coordinates: 27.58°N 85.62°E
- Country: Nepal
- Zone: Bagmati Zone
- District: Kabhrepalanchok District

Population (1991)
  - Total: 4,565
- Time zone: UTC+5:45 (Nepal Time)
- Postcode: 45205 A.P.O., Dapcha

Mathurapati Phulbari is a village development committee in Kabhrepalanchok District in the Bagmati Zone of central Nepal. At the time of the 1991 Nepal census it had a population of 4,565. The village is situated 45 km east from capital city Kathmandu. It is situated in the upper belt of the B.P Highway which joins Capital to Eastern Terai in the shortest route. The village has a mixed community including several ethnic groups staying in harmony. The main castes living in Phulbari are Brahmins, Chhetris, Tamangs, Newars and other castes. Nowadays Fulbari VDC is included in Dapcha Kashikanda municipality. Fulbari VDC main industry area is Bhakundebesi.
