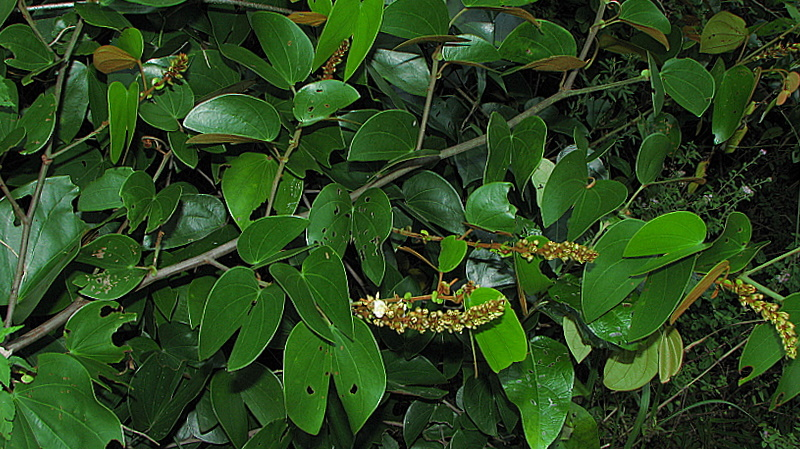
- Schnella outimouta

Scientific classification
- Kingdom: Plantae
- Clade: Tracheophytes
- Clade: Angiosperms
- Clade: Eudicots
- Clade: Rosids
- Order: Fabales
- Family: Fabaceae
- Subfamily: Cercidoideae
- Tribe: Bauhinieae
- Genus: Schnella; Raddi (1820)

Type species
- Schnella macrostachya Raddi

Species
- 32–38; see text.
- Schnella distribution map.

Synonyms
- Binaria Raf. (1838); Cardenasia Rusby (1927); Caulotretus Rich. ex Spreng. (1827); Lacara Spreng. (1822)

= Schnella =

Genus of legumes

Schnella is a genus of flowering plants in the legume family, Fabaceae. It belongs to the subfamily Cercidoideae. All of its species are neotropical lianas.

== Species ==
Schnella comprises the following species:

=== Section Schnella Raddi ===
- Schnella lilacina (Wunderlin & Eilers) Wunderlin
- Schnella maximiliani (Benth.) Wunderlin
- Schnella macrostachya Raddi
- Schnella poiteauana (Vogel) Wunderlin
- Schnella trichosepala (L.P. Queiroz) Wunderlin

=== Section Caulotretus (DC.) Wunderlin ===
- Schnella alata (Ducke) Wunderlin
- Schnella altiscandens (Ducke) Wunderlin
- Schnella anamesa (J.F. Macbr.) Wunderlin
- Schnella angulosa (Vogel) Wunderlin
  - var. angulosa (Vogel) Wunderlin
  - var. bahiana (Vaz) Trethowan & R. Clark
  - var. meridionalis (Hoehne) Trethowan & R. Clark
- Schnella carvalhoi (Vaz) Wunderlin
- Schnella confertiflora (Benth.) Wunderlin
- Schnella cupreonitens (Ducke) Wunderlin
- Schnella erythrantha (Ducke) Wunderlin
- Schnella excisa Griseb.
- Schnella glabra (Jacq.) Dugand—Monkey Ladder Vine
- Schnella grazielae (Vaz) Wunderlin
- Schnella guianensis (Aubl.) Wunderlin—Granny backbone
  - var. guianensis (Aubl.) Wunderlin
  - var. splendens (Kunth) Wunderlin
- Schnella klugii (Standl.) Wunderlin
- Schnella kunthiana (Vogel) Wunderlin
- Schnella longiseta (Fróes) Wunderlin
- Schnella obovata (S.F.Blake) Britton & Rose
- Schnella outimouta (Aubl.) Wunderlin
- Schnella platycalyx (Benth.) Wunderlin
- Schnella porphyrotricha (Harms) Wunderlin
  - var. killipiana (J.F. Macbride) Trethowan & R. Clark
  - var. porphyrotricha (Harms) Wunderlin
  - var. smithiana (Standley) Trethowan & R. Clark
- Schnella pterocalyx (Ducke) Wunderlin
- Schnella reflexa (Schery) Wunderlin
- Schnella riedeliana (Bong.) Wunderlin
- Schnella siqueirae (Ducke) Wunderlin
- Schnella splendens (Kunth) Bentham
- Schnella sprucei (Benth.) Wunderlin
- Schnella surinamensis (Amshoff) Wunderlin
- Schnella uleana (Harms) Wunderlin

=== Incertae sedis ===
- Schnella accrescens (Killip & J.F. Macbr.) Trethowan & R. Clark
- Schnella bahiachalensis Zamora
- Schnella coronata (Bentham) Pittier
- Schnella flexuosa (Moricand) Walpers
- Schnella guentheri (Harms) Trethowan & R. Clark
- Schnella herrerae Britton & Rose
- Schnella hirsutissima (Wunderlin) Trethowan & R. Clark
- Schnella hymenaeifolia (Triana ex Hemsley) Britton & Rose
  - var. hymenaeifolia (Triana ex Hemsley) Britton & Rose
  - var. stuebeliana (Harms) Trethowan & R. Clark
- Schnella microstachya Raddi
  - var. massambabensis (Vaz) Trethowan & R. Clark
  - var. microstachya Raddi
- Schnella radiata (Vellozo) Trethowan & R. Clark
- Schnella rutilans (Spruce ex Bentham) Pittier
- Schnella scala-simiae (Sandwith) Trethowan & R. Clark
- Schnella smilacina (Schott ex Sprengel) G. Don
- Schnella stenoloba Britton & Killip
- Schnella vestita (Benth) J.F. Macbride
- Schnella vulpina (Rusby) Trethowan & R. Clark

=== Species names with uncertain taxonomic status ===
The status of the following species is unresolved:

- Schnella emarginata Klotzsch
- Schnella macrophylla Griseb.
- Schnella mutisii Britton & Killip
- Schnella nigra Britton & Killip
- Schnella nitida Britton & Killip
- Schnella trinitensis Britton ex R.O.Williams
- Schnella umbriana Britton & Killip
- Schnella versicolor Britton & Killip
