= Lasiobema =

Scientific classification
- Kingdom: Plantae
- Clade: Tracheophytes
- Clade: Angiosperms
- Clade: Eudicots
- Clade: Rosids
- Order: Fabales
- Family: Fabaceae
- Subfamily: Cercidoideae
- Genus: Lasiobema (Korth.) Miq.

Moved species
- see text.

Synonyms
- Bauhinia L.

Genus of legumes

Lasiobema was a genus of flowering plants in the legume family, Fabaceae, most of which are lianas, belonging to the subfamily Cercidoideae. It was recently (2010) synonymized with Phanera on the basis of morphology, although this was questioned and it can be treated as a section of this genus.

== Species ==
Lasiobema comprised the following species (several previously placed in Bauhinia):

- Lasiobema championii (Benth.) De Wit
- Lasiobema comosa (W. G. Craib) A. Schmitz
- Lasiobema curtisii (Prain) de Wit
- Lasiobema delavayi (Franch.) A. Schmitz
- Lasiobema dolichobotrys (Merr.) A. Schmitz
- Lasiobema flavum de Wit
- Lasiobema harmsianum (Hosseus) de Wit
- Lasiobema japonicum (Maxim.) de Wit
- Lasiobema penicilliloba (Pierre ex Gagnep) A. Schmitz
- Lasiobema retusum (Roxb.) de Wit
- Lasiobema scandens (L.) de Wit
  - var. horsfieldii (Prain) K.Larsen & S.S.Larsen
  - var. scandens (L.) de Wit
- Lasiobema strychnoideum (Prain) de Wit
- Lasiobema tubicalyx (Craib) de Wit
