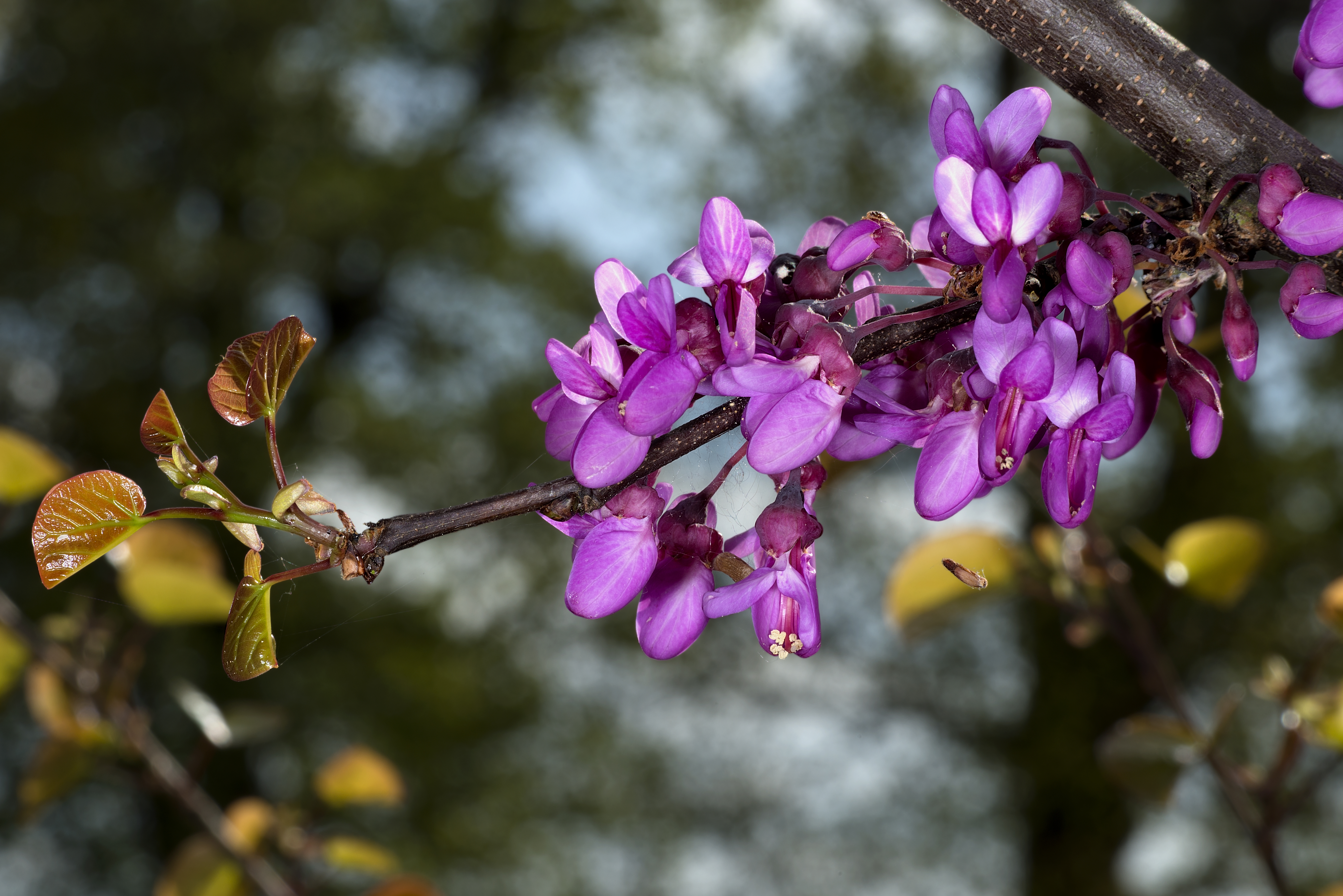
- Cercis siliquastrum
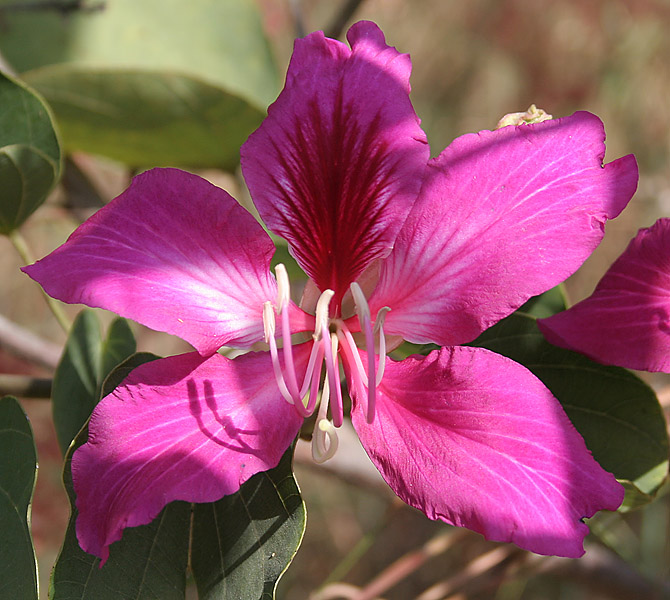
- Phanera variegata

Scientific classification
- Kingdom: Plantae
- Clade: Embryophytes
- Clade: Tracheophytes
- Clade: Spermatophytes
- Clade: Angiosperms
- Clade: Eudicots
- Clade: Rosids
- Order: Fabales
- Family: Fabaceae
- Subfamily: Cercidoideae; Legume Phylogeny Working Group

Type genus
- Cercis L.

Genera
- See text

Synonyms
- Bauhiniaceae Martynov 1820; Cerceae Bronn 1822; Cercideae Bronn 1822

= Cercidoideae =

Cercidoideae Temporal range: Late Paleocene - recent

Subfamily of legumes

Cercidoideae is a subfamily in the pea family, Fabaceae. Well-known members include Cercis (redbuds), including species widely cultivated as ornamental trees in the United States and Europe, Bauhinia, widely cultivated as an ornamental tree in tropical Asia, and Tylosema, a semi-woody genus of Africa. The subfamily occupies a basal position within the Fabaceae and is supported as monophyletic in many molecular phylogenies. At the 6th International Legume Conference, the Legume Phylogeny Working Group proposed elevating the tribe Cercidae to the level of subfamily within the Leguminosae (Fabaceae). The consensus agreed to the change, which was fully implemented in 2017. It has the following clade-based definition:

The most inclusive crown clade containing Cercis canadensis L. and Bauhinia divaricata L. but not Poeppigia procera C.Presl, Duparquetia orchidacea Baill., or Bobgunnia fistuloides (Harms) J.H.Kirkbr. & Wiersema.

Many genera show unique palynology.

== Genera ==
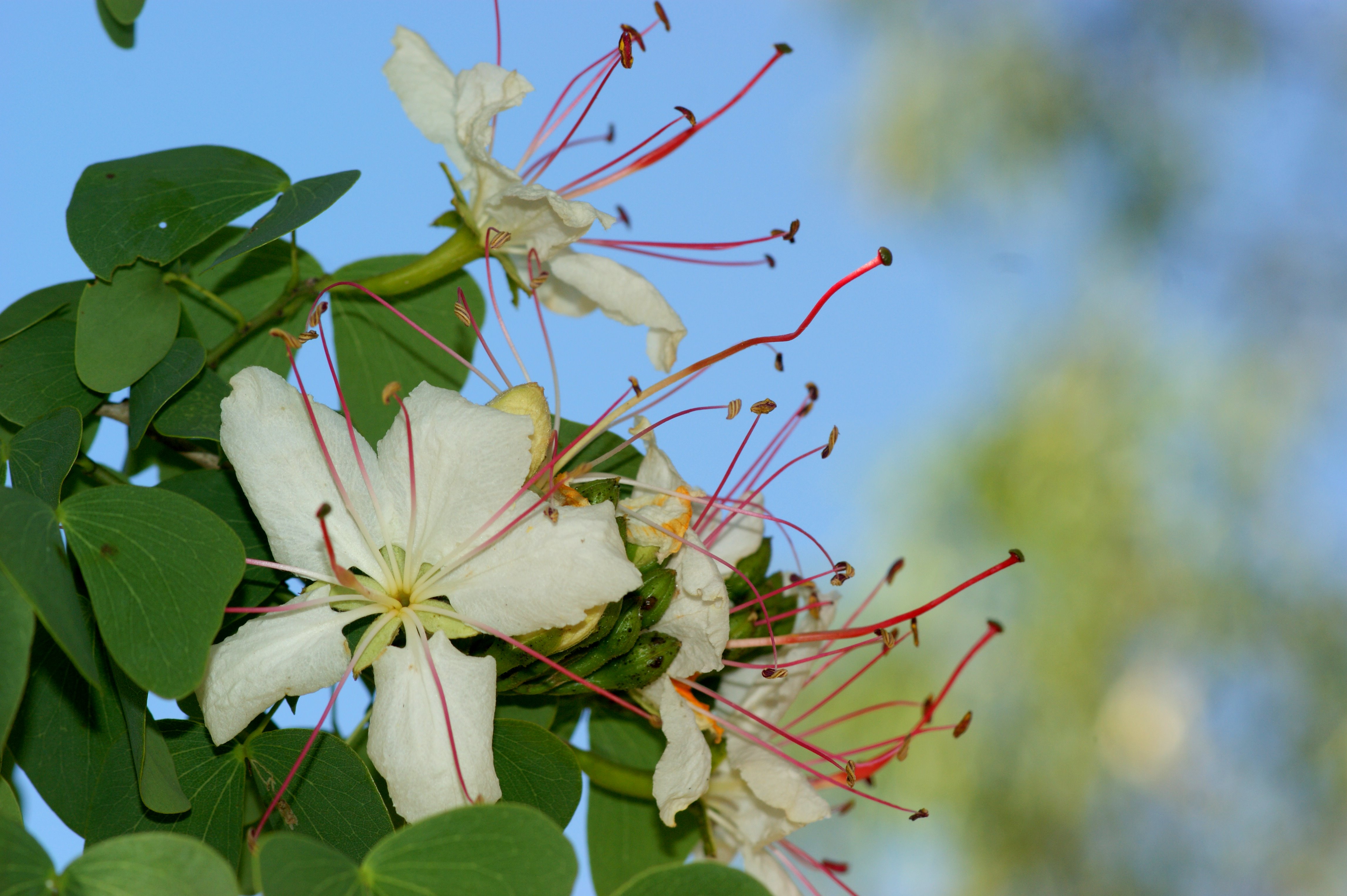
Lysiphyllum hookeri

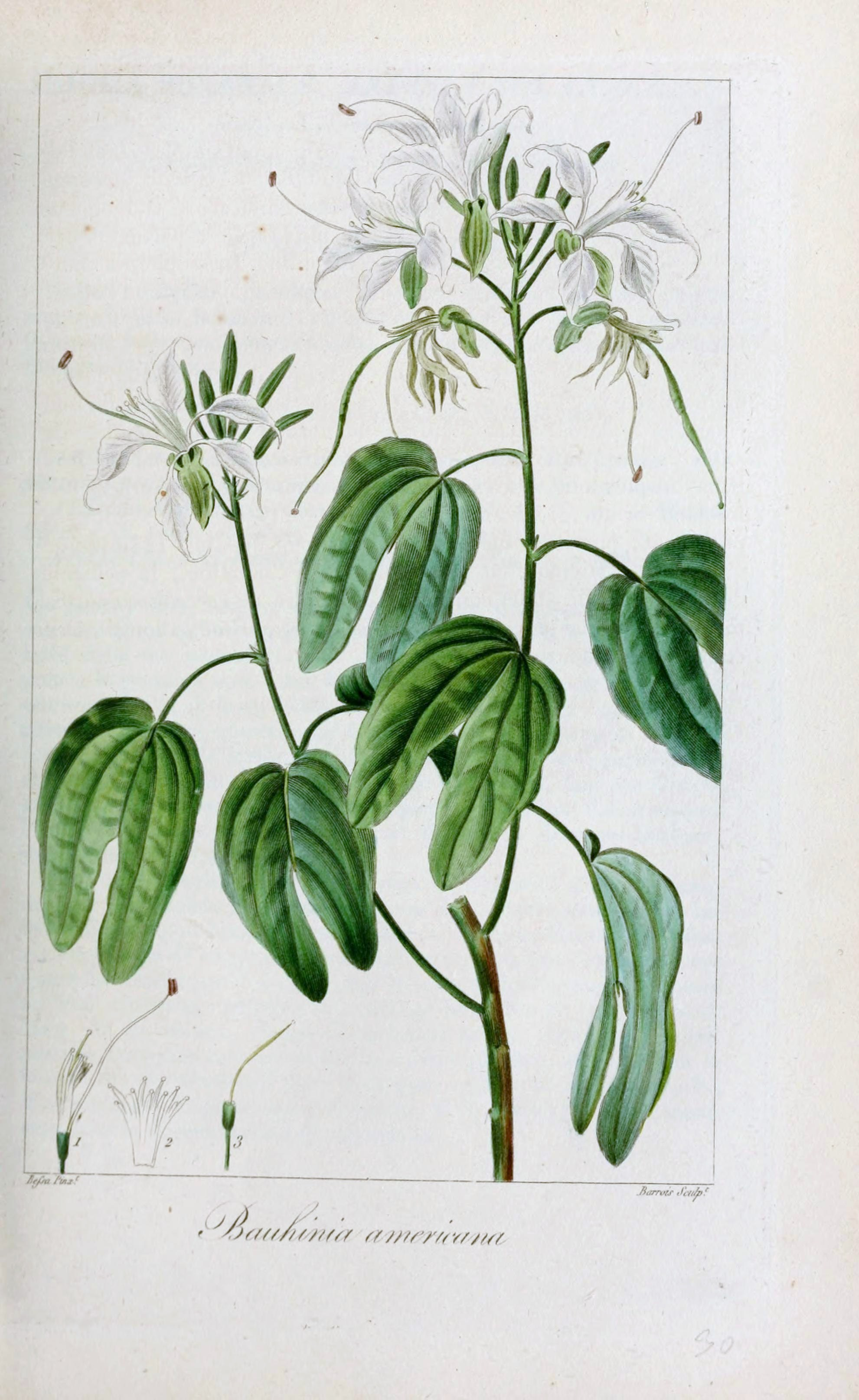
Bauhinia divaricata

Cercidoideae comprises the following genera organized into tribes:

=== Cercideae ===
- Adenolobus (Harv. ex Benth. & Hook.f.) Torre & Hillc.
- Cercis L.
- Griffonia Baill.

=== Bauhinieae ===
- Barklya F. Muell.
- Bauhinia L.
- Brenierea Humbert
- Cheniella R.Clark & Mackinder
- Gigasiphon Drake
- Lysiphyllum (Benth.) deWit
- Phanera Lour. (includes Lasiobema (Korth.) Miq. (Note: Several sources now treat Lasiobema as a section of genus Phanera.))
- Piliostigma Hochst.
- Schnella Raddi
- Tournaya A.Schmitz
- Tylosema (Schweinf.) Torre & Hillc.

=== Extinct ===
- †Bauhcis Calvillo-Canadell and Cevallos-Ferriz

== Phylogeny ==
Molecular phylogenetics suggest the following relationships:

- Fabales
  - Detarioideae (outgroup)
  - Cercidoideae
    - Cercis
    - - Adenolobus
      - - Griffonia
        - - - Piliostigma
            - - Brenierea
              - Bauhinia sensu stricto
          - - Gigasiphon
            - - Tylosema
              - - Schnella
                - - Barklya
                  - - Lysiphyllum
                    - - Cheniella
                      - - Lasiobema
                        - Phanera
