= Dichomeris eucomopa =

Scientific classification
- Kingdom: Animalia
- Phylum: Arthropoda
- Class: Insecta
- Order: Lepidoptera
- Family: Gelechiidae
- Genus: Dichomeris
- Species: D. eucomopa

Binomial name
- Dichomeris eucomopa Meyrick, 1939

Species of moth

Dichomeris eucomopa is a moth in the family Gelechiidae. It was described by Edward Meyrick in 1939. It is found on Java in Indonesia.

The larvae feed on Bauhinia species.
