= Baho-baho =

Baho-baho is Filipino for 'smelly'. It is the common name of two flowering plants known for their pungent odors and may refer to:

- Lantana camara, a wildflower commonly known as the Spanish flag
- Bauhinia tomentosa, the yellow bell orchid tree
