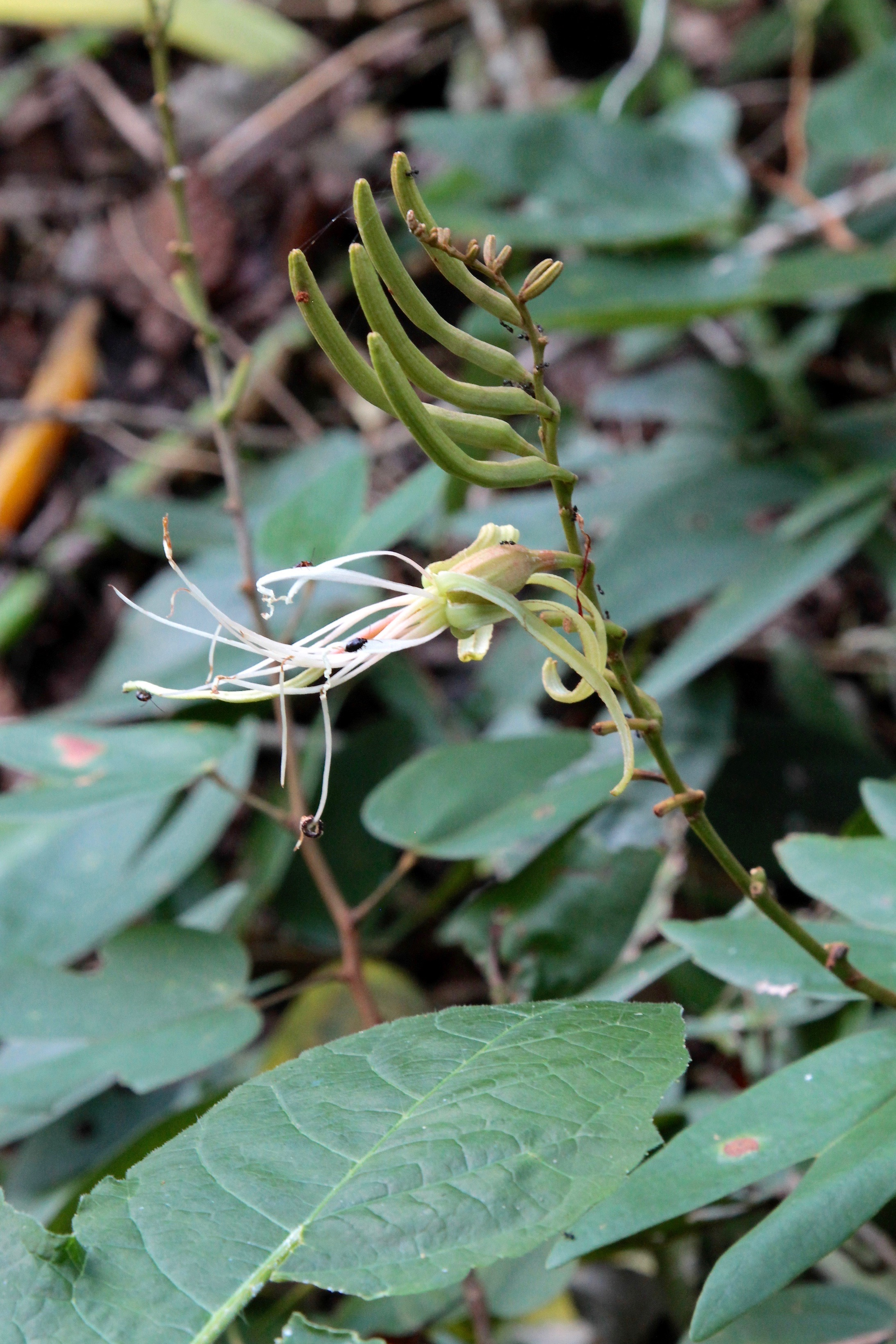
- Along the Caura River, Bolívar, Venezuela

Scientific classification
- Kingdom: Plantae
- Clade: Tracheophytes
- Clade: Angiosperms
- Clade: Eudicots
- Clade: Rosids
- Order: Fabales
- Family: Fabaceae
- Genus: Bauhinia
- Species: B. multinervia

Binomial name
- Bauhinia multinervia (Kunth) DC.

Synonyms
- Pauletia multinervia; Bauhinia glaucescens; Bauhinia megalandra; Pauletia glaucescens

= Bauhinia multinervia =

Species of tree

Bauhinia multinervia, commonly known as the petite flamboyant bauhinia, is a species of tree in the genus Bauhinia. It grows in the wet tropical biome and is native to Venezuela, Trinidad and Tobago, Suriname, the Leeward Islands and the Windward Islands. In Puerto Rico, it is an introduced species.
