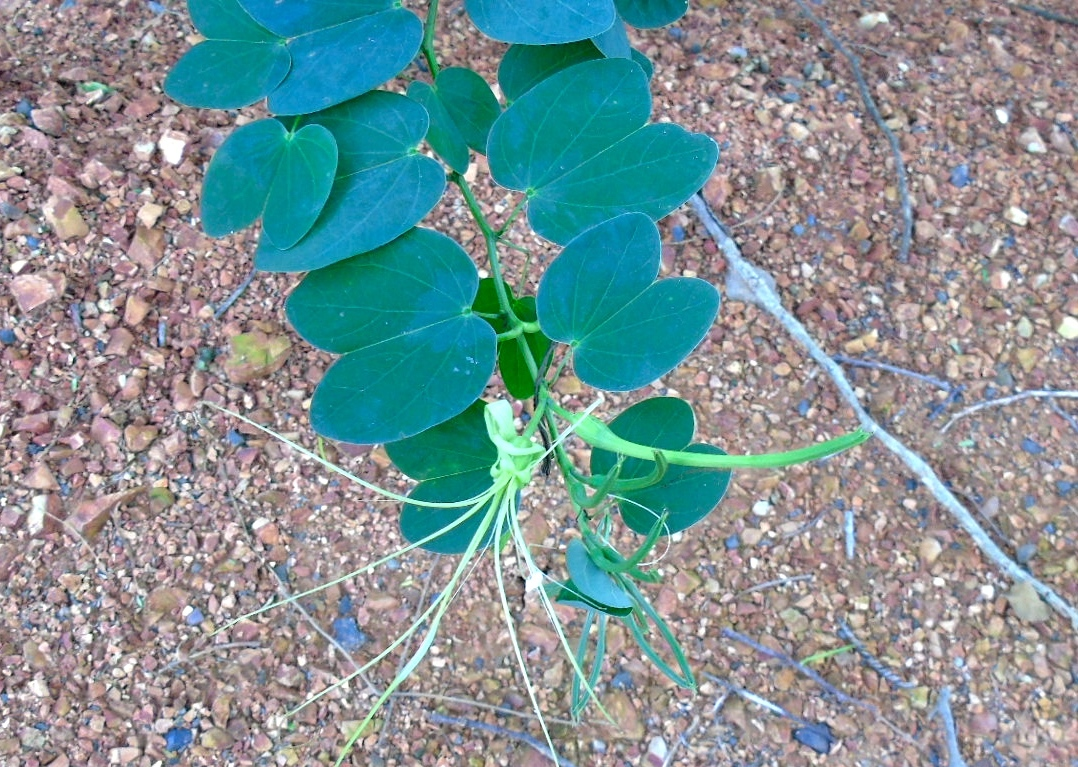
- Flowers show features consistent with bat-pollination
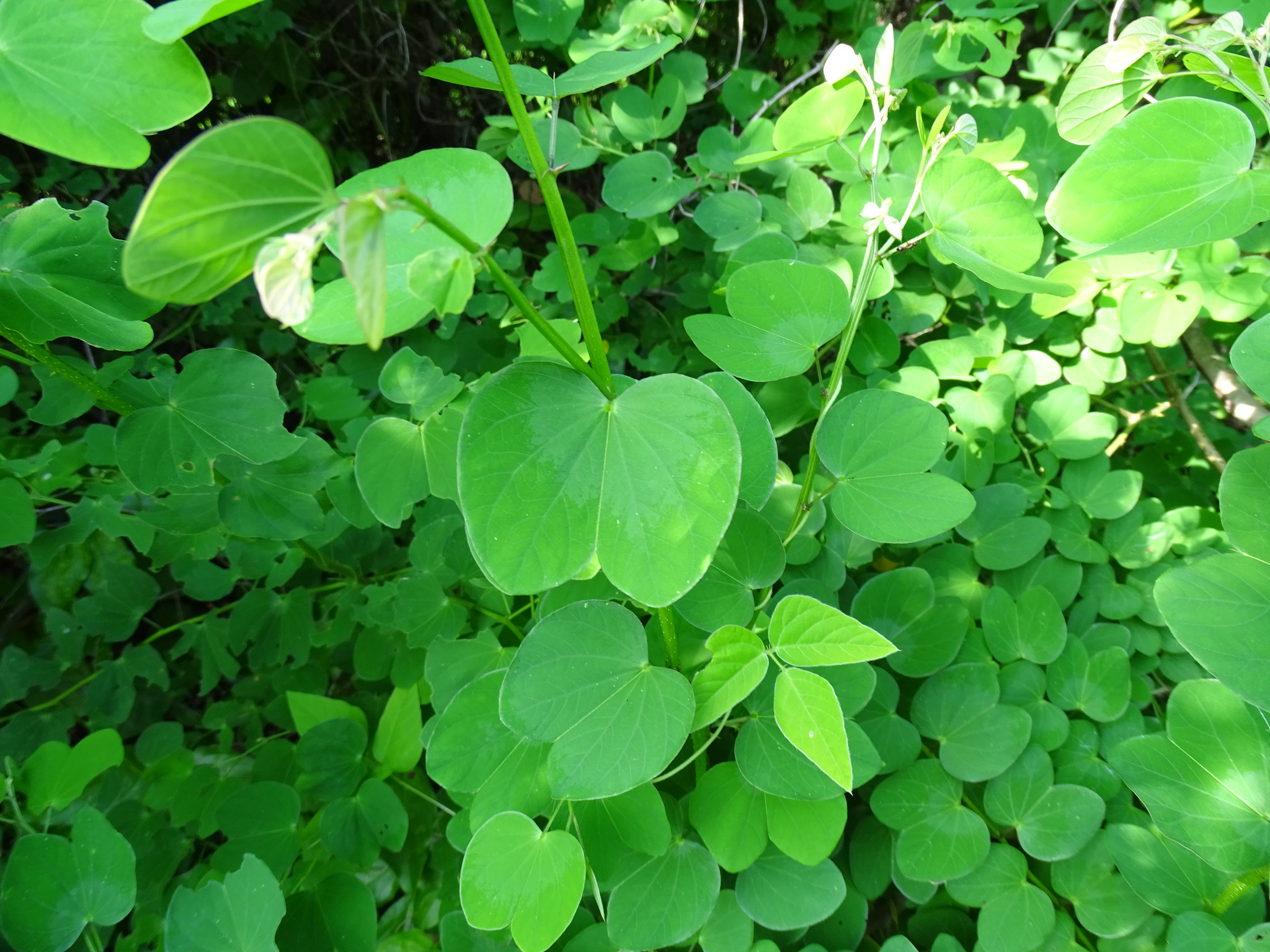
- In Mexico

Conservation status
- Least Concern (IUCN 3.1)

Scientific classification
- Kingdom: Plantae
- Clade: Tracheophytes
- Clade: Angiosperms
- Clade: Eudicots
- Clade: Rosids
- Order: Fabales
- Family: Fabaceae
- Genus: Bauhinia
- Species: B. pauletia

Binomial name
- Bauhinia pauletia Pers.

Synonyms
- Bauhinia chlorantha Brandegee; Bauhinia leptopetala Moc. & Sessé ex DC.; Bauhinia longiflora Rose; Bauhinia panamensis Spreng.; Bauhinia parvifolia Seem.; Bauhinia spinosa Poir.; Pauletia aculeata Cav.

= Bauhinia pauletia =

Species of plant

Bauhinia pauletia, the railway fence bauhinia, is a species of flowering plant in the family Fabaceae. It is native to wet tropical forests of Mexico, Central America, Colombia, Venezuela, and Trinidad, and it has been introduced to Puerto Rico. A shrub or tree, it is bat-pollinated. It has been assessed as Least Concern.
