= Bauhinia augusti =

Conservation status
- Vulnerable (IUCN 2.3)

Scientific classification
- Kingdom: Plantae
- Clade: Tracheophytes
- Clade: Angiosperms
- Clade: Eudicots
- Clade: Rosids
- Order: Fabales
- Family: Fabaceae
- Genus: Bauhinia
- Species: B. augusti

Binomial name
- Bauhinia augusti Harms

Species of legume

Bauhinia augusti is a species of plant in the family Fabaceae. It is found only in Peru.
