= Bauhinia integerrima =

Conservation status
- Endangered (IUCN 2.3)

Scientific classification
- Kingdom: Plantae
- Clade: Tracheophytes
- Clade: Angiosperms
- Clade: Eudicots
- Clade: Rosids
- Order: Fabales
- Family: Fabaceae
- Genus: Bauhinia
- Species: B. integerrima

Binomial name
- Bauhinia integerrima Mart ex Benth

Species of legume

Bauhinia integerrima is a species of plant in the family Fabaceae, in Brazil. The plant is endemic to southern Bahia state, in the Atlantic Forest ecoregion of Southeast Brazil.
