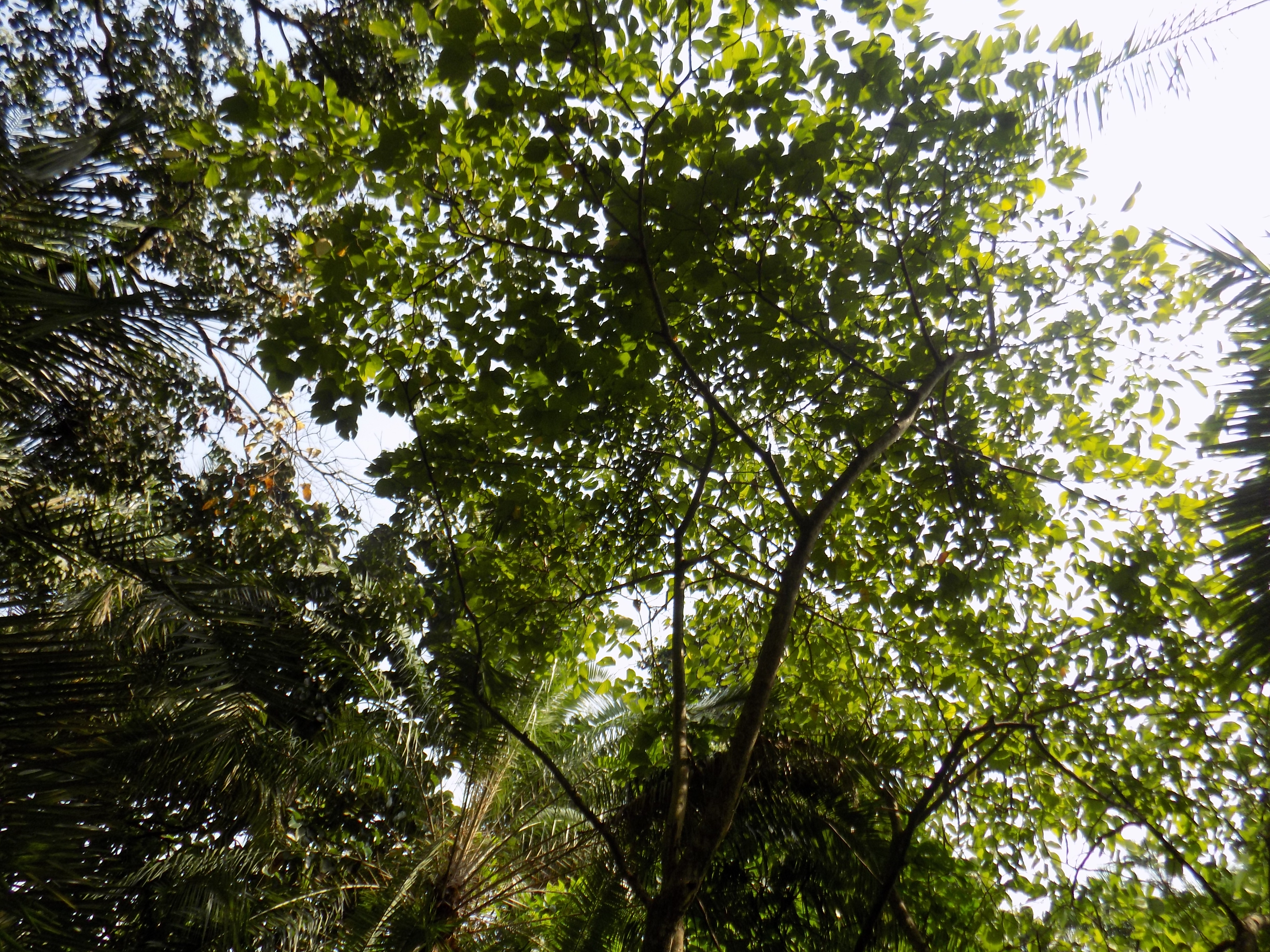

Conservation status
- Least Concern (IUCN 3.1)

Scientific classification
- Kingdom: Plantae
- Clade: Embryophytes
- Clade: Tracheophytes
- Clade: Spermatophytes
- Clade: Angiosperms
- Clade: Eudicots
- Clade: Rosids
- Order: Fabales
- Family: Fabaceae
- Genus: Bauhinia
- Species: B. picta

Binomial name
- Bauhinia picta (Kunth) DC.

= Bauhinia picta =

Species of legume

Bauhinia picta, known as the algodoncillo, casco de vaca, palo de orquídeas, or pata de vaca, is a species of plant in the family Fabaceae. It is found in Colombia, Mexico, Panama, Venezuela, and Ecuador.
