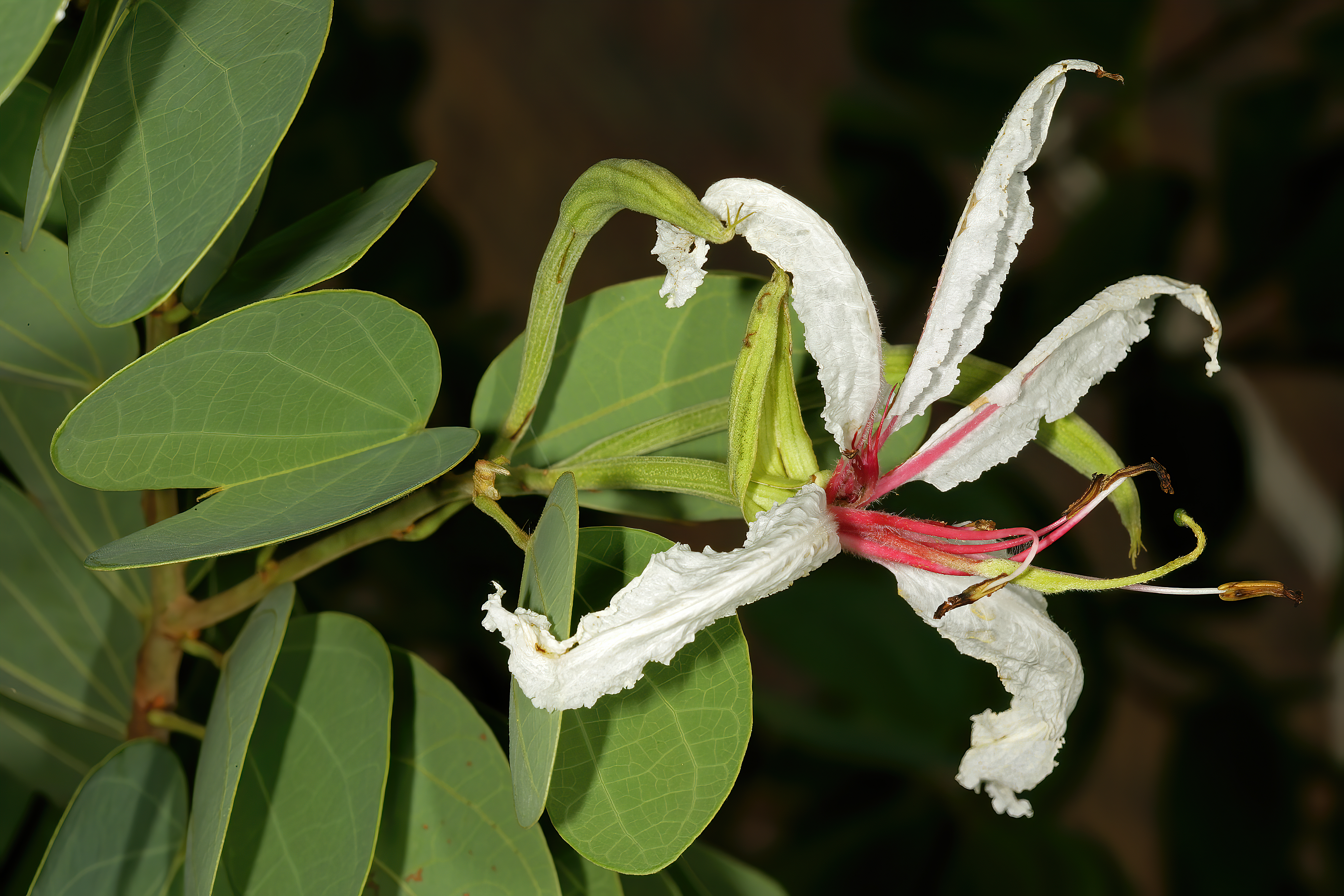

Scientific classification
- Kingdom: Plantae
- Clade: Embryophytes
- Clade: Tracheophytes
- Clade: Spermatophytes
- Clade: Angiosperms
- Clade: Eudicots
- Clade: Rosids
- Order: Fabales
- Family: Fabaceae
- Genus: Bauhinia
- Species: B. petersiana

Binomial name
- Bauhinia petersiana Bolle

Synonyms
- Bauhinia macrantha Oliv. 1871

= Bauhinia petersiana =

Species of legume

Bauhinia petersiana, the Kalahari white bauhinia, is a species of shrubs in the family Fabaceae and the subfamily Cercidoideae found in Angola, Botswana, Democratic Republic of Congo, Lesotho, Mozambique, Namibia, South Africa, Tanzania, Zambia and Zimbabwe. The species is 2 metres (6 ft 7 in) in height. The flower is up to 15 cm (5.9 in) wide, with five narrow white petals.

== Ecology ==
In East Africa, the plant grows at altitudes of 150–1,850 metres (490–6,070 ft), while in South Africa it can be found in dry places, such as the Kalahari Desert at the altitudes around 350 metres (1,150 ft). The plant can withstand frost.

== Various uses of the plant ==
=== Plant as food ===
The seeds of this plant are considered a delicacy in Botswana, where they are used as nuts. Ground and roasted seeds are often used for coffee. The unripe seeds are not harmful to humans and can be eaten. Botswanans also use the plants seeds for oil.

=== Craftsmanship ===
In Congo, the bark is used for rope making, while the roots are used to make dye. The plant is harvested by livestock. It is grown as a decorative plant in countries like South Africa, Zimbabwe, and even in the United States.

=== Medicine ===
In Zimbabwe, the Shona tribe uses the plant's roots for medical reasons, such as for treating dysmenorrhoea and female infertility. In South Africa, the plant's pounded leaves, when mixed with salt, are used to cure wounds. The macerated roots of the plant are used for treating diarrhoea. Despite its widespread usage, the plant was never domesticated, and therefore was poorly documented.
