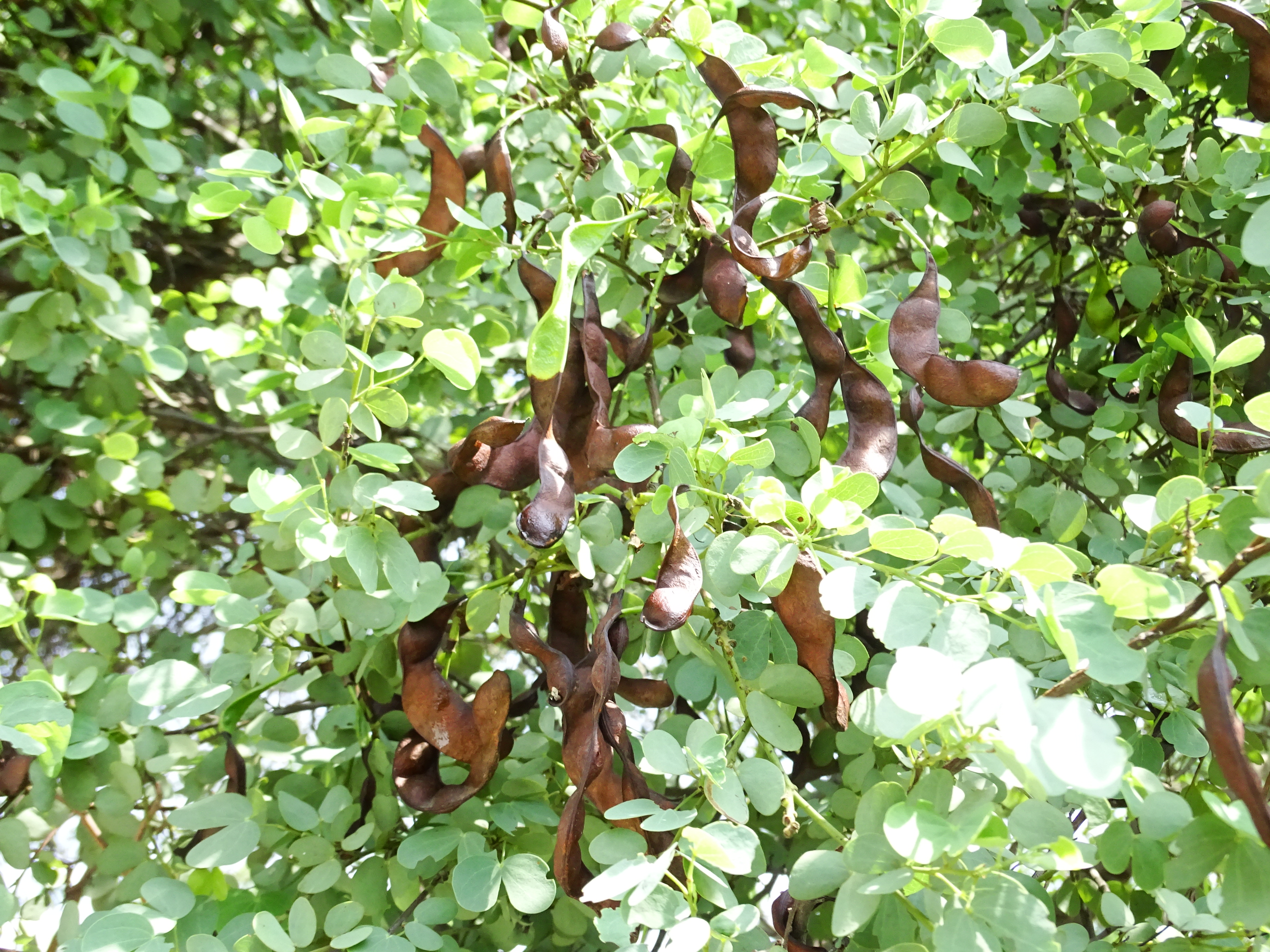

Scientific classification
- Kingdom: Plantae
- Clade: Tracheophytes
- Clade: Angiosperms
- Clade: Eudicots
- Clade: Rosids
- Order: Fabales
- Family: Fabaceae
- Genus: Bauhinia
- Species: B. rufescens

Binomial name
- Bauhinia rufescens Lam.

= Bauhinia rufescens =

Species of legume

Bauhinia rufescens is a shrub in the family Fabaceae, native to semi-arid areas of Africa such as the Sahel.

It is usually 1–3 meters high but can grow to 8 meters. It appears to have thorns which are actually leafless shoots. Leaves are a deep shade of green. Seeds in bunches of dark brown pods.

It is common in the wild and also used as an ornamental.
