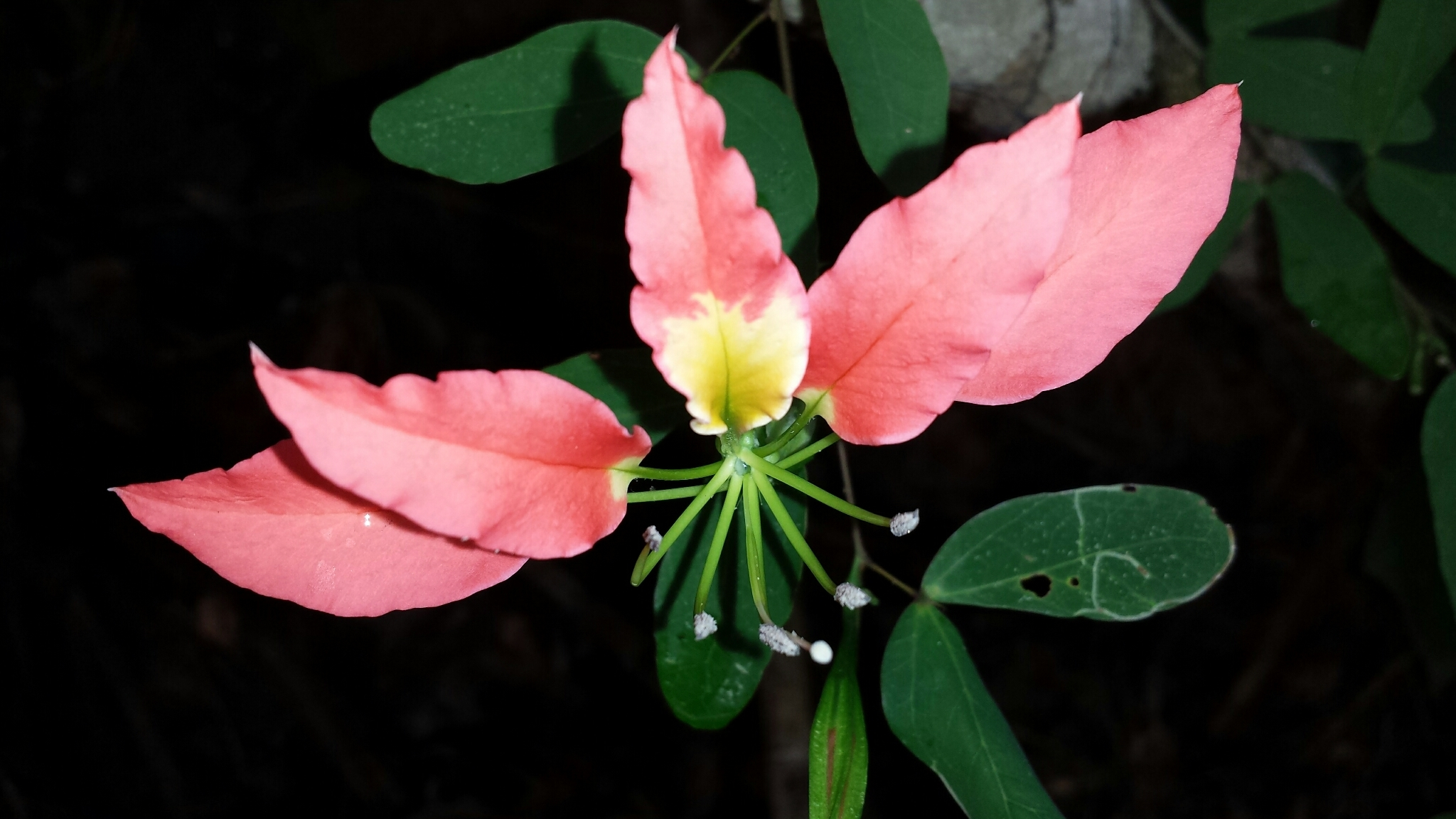

Scientific classification
- Kingdom: Plantae
- Clade: Tracheophytes
- Clade: Angiosperms
- Clade: Eudicots
- Clade: Rosids
- Order: Fabales
- Family: Fabaceae
- Genus: Bauhinia
- Species: B. madagascariensis

Binomial name
- Bauhinia madagascariensis Desv.

= Bauhinia madagascariensis =

Species of legume

Bauhinia madagascariensis is a flowering plant in the family Fabaceae native to Madagascar, where it grows from sea level up to 900 m altitude in xerophytic deciduous scrubland. It is a shrub or small tree growing up to 4 metres (13 ft) in height. The flowers have five petals arranged in an upward-pointing arc, the central one pink with a yellow base; the four side petals are all pink. The leaves are deeply bilobed.
