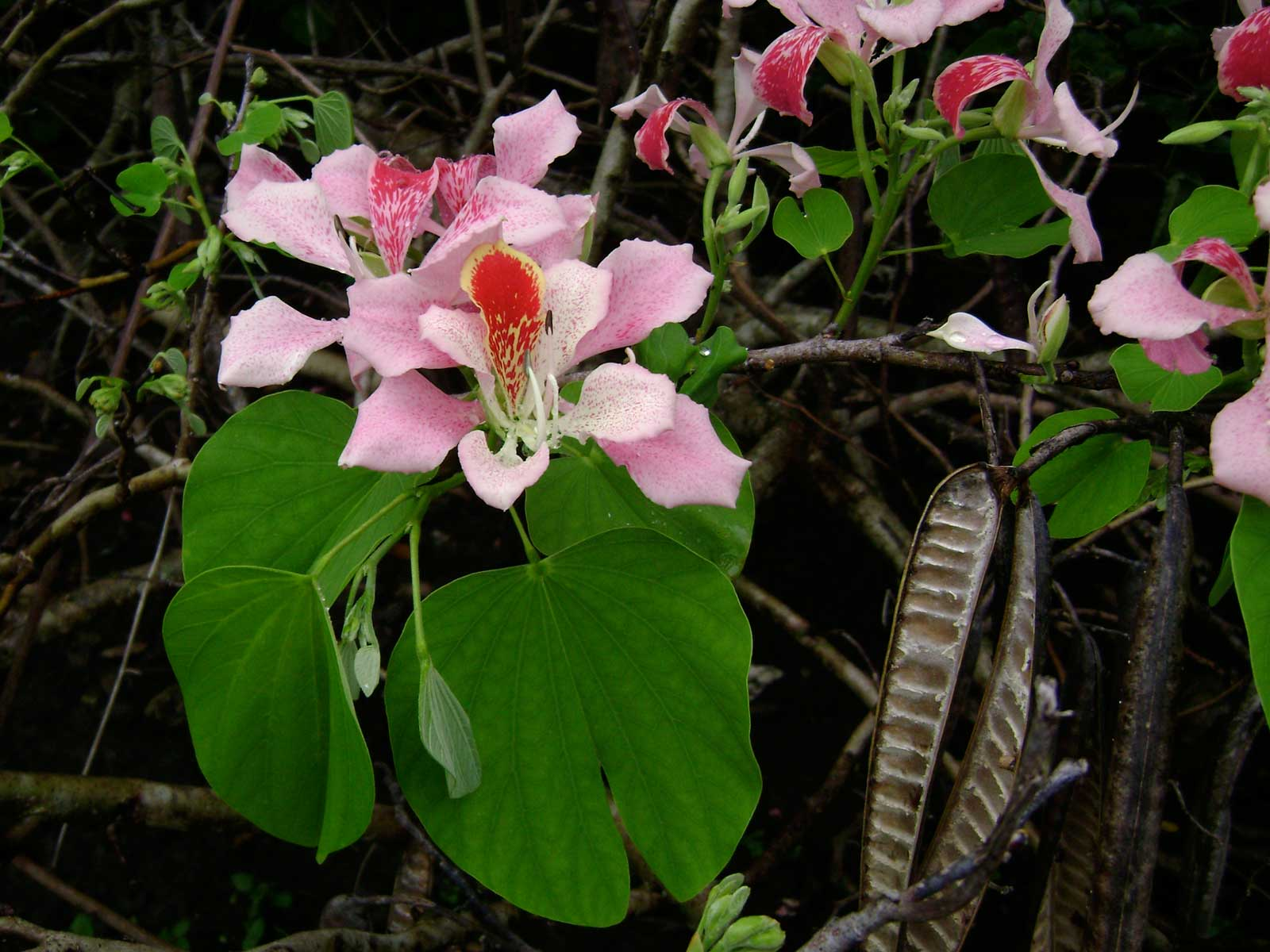

Conservation status
- Data Deficient (IUCN 3.1)

Scientific classification
- Kingdom: Plantae
- Clade: Embryophytes
- Clade: Tracheophytes
- Clade: Spermatophytes
- Clade: Angiosperms
- Clade: Eudicots
- Clade: Rosids
- Order: Fabales
- Family: Fabaceae
- Genus: Bauhinia
- Species: B. monandra

Binomial name
- Bauhinia monandra Kurz

Synonyms
- Caspareopsis monandra (Kurz) Britton & Rose; Bauhinia kappleri Sagot; Bauhinia krugii Urb.; Bauhinia krugii Urb.; Bauhinia persichii F.Muell.; Bauhinia porosa Boivin ex Baill.; Bauhinia punctiflora Baker; Monoteles paradoxa Raf.

= Bauhinia monandra =

Species of legume

Bauhinia monandra is a species of leguminous trees in the family Fabaceae. Common names include pink bauhinia, orchid tree, and Napoleon's plume. The tree is native to Madagascar, where it is widespread in lowland humid forests and dry forests. It has naturalised in Myanmar, Australia, Christmas Island, the Caribbean, southern USA, Colombia, Brazil, and the Pacific Islands. The species is invasive in New Caledonia.

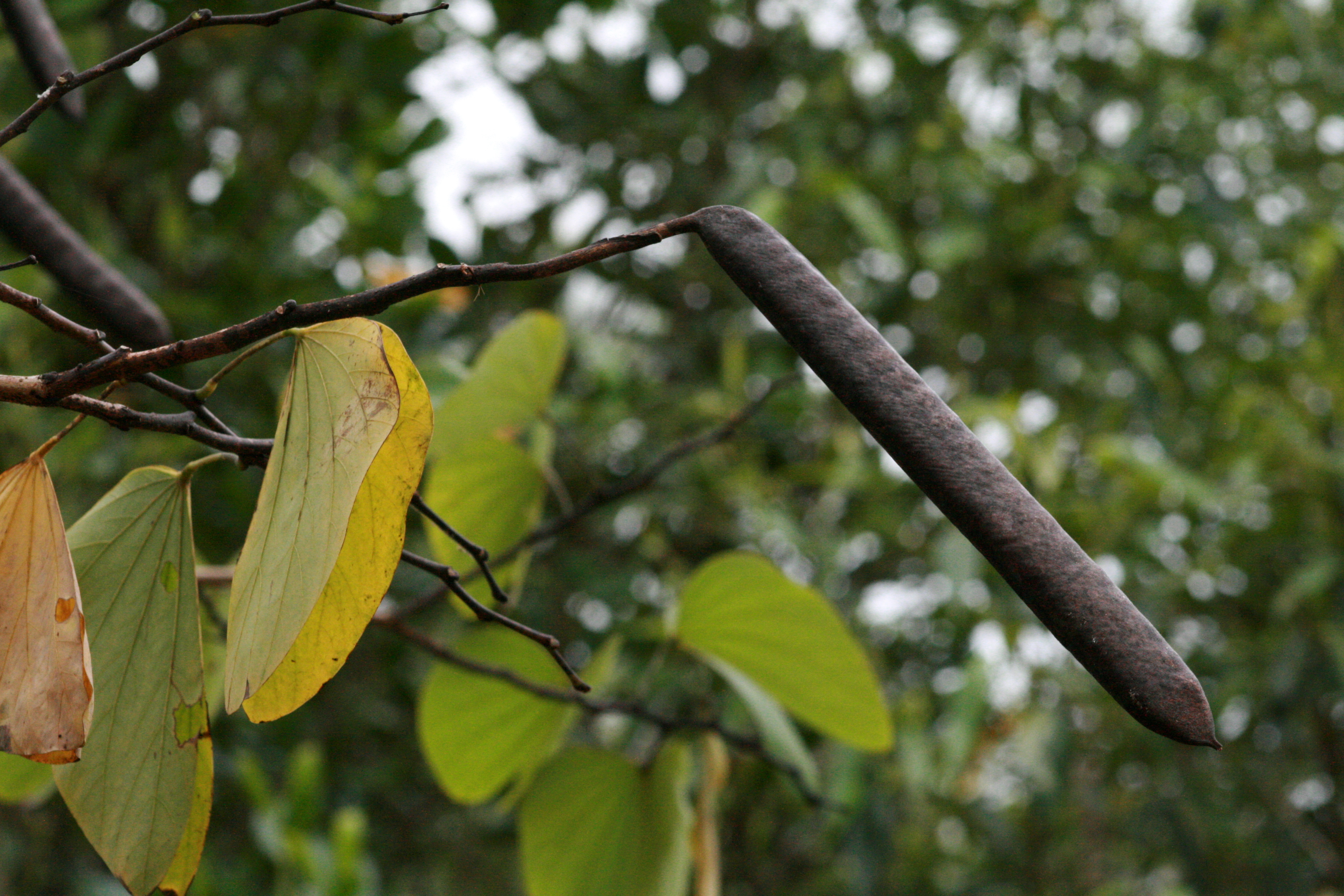
Seed pod
