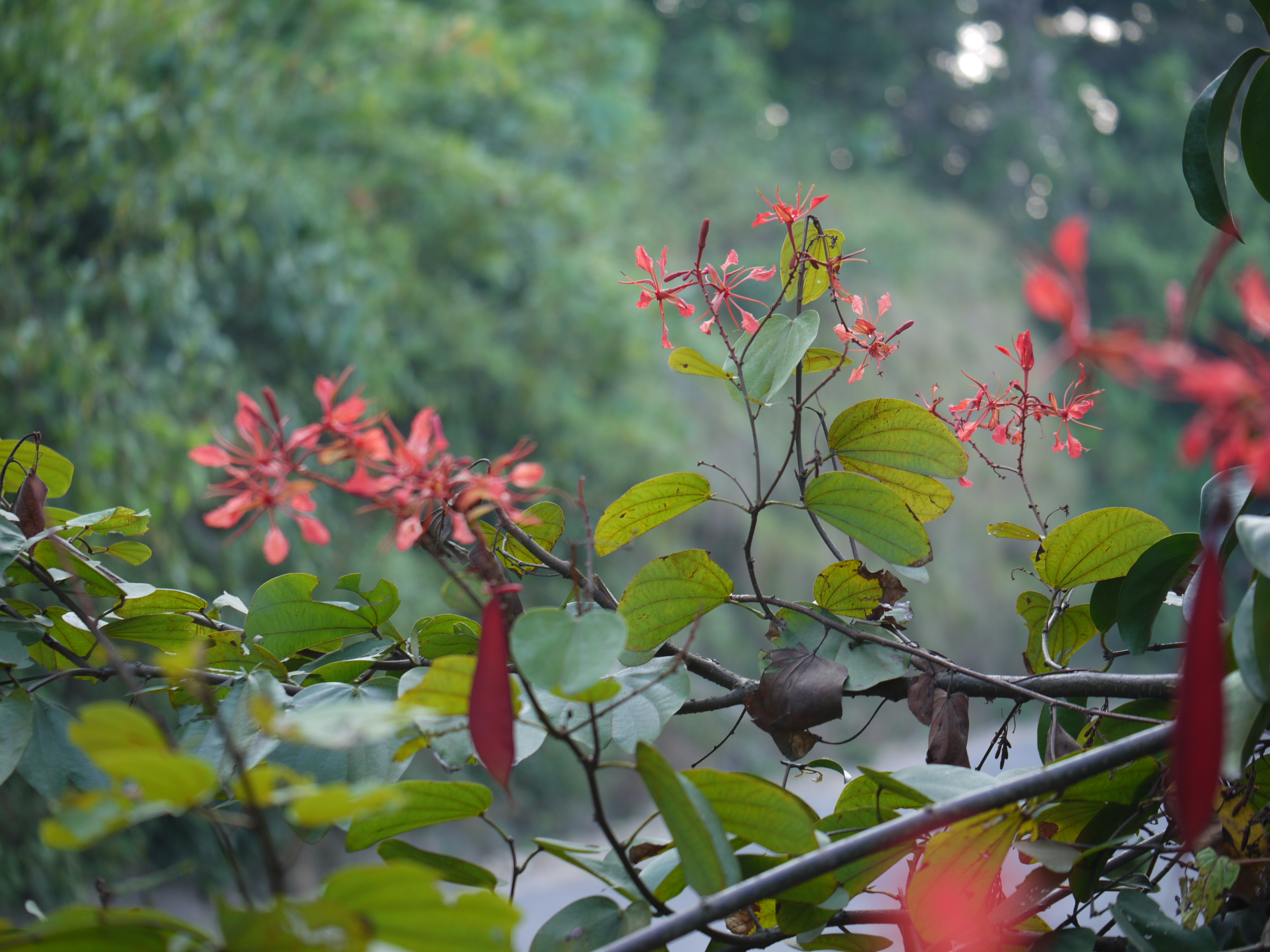

Scientific classification
- Kingdom: Plantae
- Clade: Embryophytes
- Clade: Tracheophytes
- Clade: Spermatophytes
- Clade: Angiosperms
- Clade: Eudicots
- Clade: Rosids
- Order: Fabales
- Family: Fabaceae
- Genus: Bauhinia
- Species: B. phoenicea

Binomial name
- Bauhinia phoenicea Wight & Arn.

Synonyms
- Phanera phoenicea (Wight & Arn.)Benth. Bauhinia benthamii Bedd. Bauhinia phoenicea B.Heyne; Bauhinia ruficarpa Desv. Perlebia phoenicea (B.Heyne ex Wight & Arn.) A.Schmitz; Phanera phoenicea (B.Heyne ex Wight & Arn.) Benth.

= Bauhinia phoenicea =

Species of plant

Bauhinia phoenicea is a liana endemic to the Western Ghats of India.

== Description ==
This species can grow as liana or a small shrub up to 10 meters high. The leaves are simple and alternate. The flowers are brick red in color. The seed pods are oblong shaped, brownish and hairy, 14–18 cm long and 3–4 cm wide. The seeds are dark brown in color.

== Distribution and habitat ==
It can be seen around the evergreen and semi-evergreen forests of Karnataka, Kerala and Tamil Nadu. It usually grows on slopes of the ghats between an altitude of 150–1800 meters. It is known to climb to the top of the trees in such forests.

== Ecology ==
It was recorded as larval host plant for Blue nawab and Common Imperial butterflies. Parts of this tree were used by locals in treating different ailments.
