= Bauhinia seleriana =

Conservation status
- Least Concern (IUCN 3.1)

Scientific classification
- Kingdom: Plantae
- Clade: Tracheophytes
- Clade: Angiosperms
- Clade: Eudicots
- Clade: Rosids
- Order: Fabales
- Family: Fabaceae
- Genus: Bauhinia
- Species: B. seleriana

Binomial name
- Bauhinia seleriana Harms

Synonyms
- Bauhinia paradisi Standl. & L.O.Williams; Pauletia seleriana (Harms) A.Schmitz

Species of legume

Bauhinia seleriana is a species of flowering plant in the family Fabaceae. It is tree which ranges from central and southern Mexico to Honduras. It grows in dense moist forest, pine forest, oak scrub, and on volcanic rocks from 200 to 1,100 meters elevation.
