= Bauhinia pichinchensis =

Conservation status
- Vulnerable (IUCN 3.1)

Scientific classification
- Kingdom: Plantae
- Clade: Tracheophytes
- Clade: Angiosperms
- Clade: Eudicots
- Clade: Rosids
- Order: Fabales
- Family: Fabaceae
- Genus: Bauhinia
- Species: B. pichinchensis

Binomial name
- Bauhinia pichinchensis Wunderlin

Species of legume

Bauhinia pichinchensis is a species of plant in the family Fabaceae. It grows as a tree reaching 10 m in height. It is found only in Ecuador. Its natural habitats are subtropical or tropical moist lowland forests and subtropical or tropical moist montane forests.
