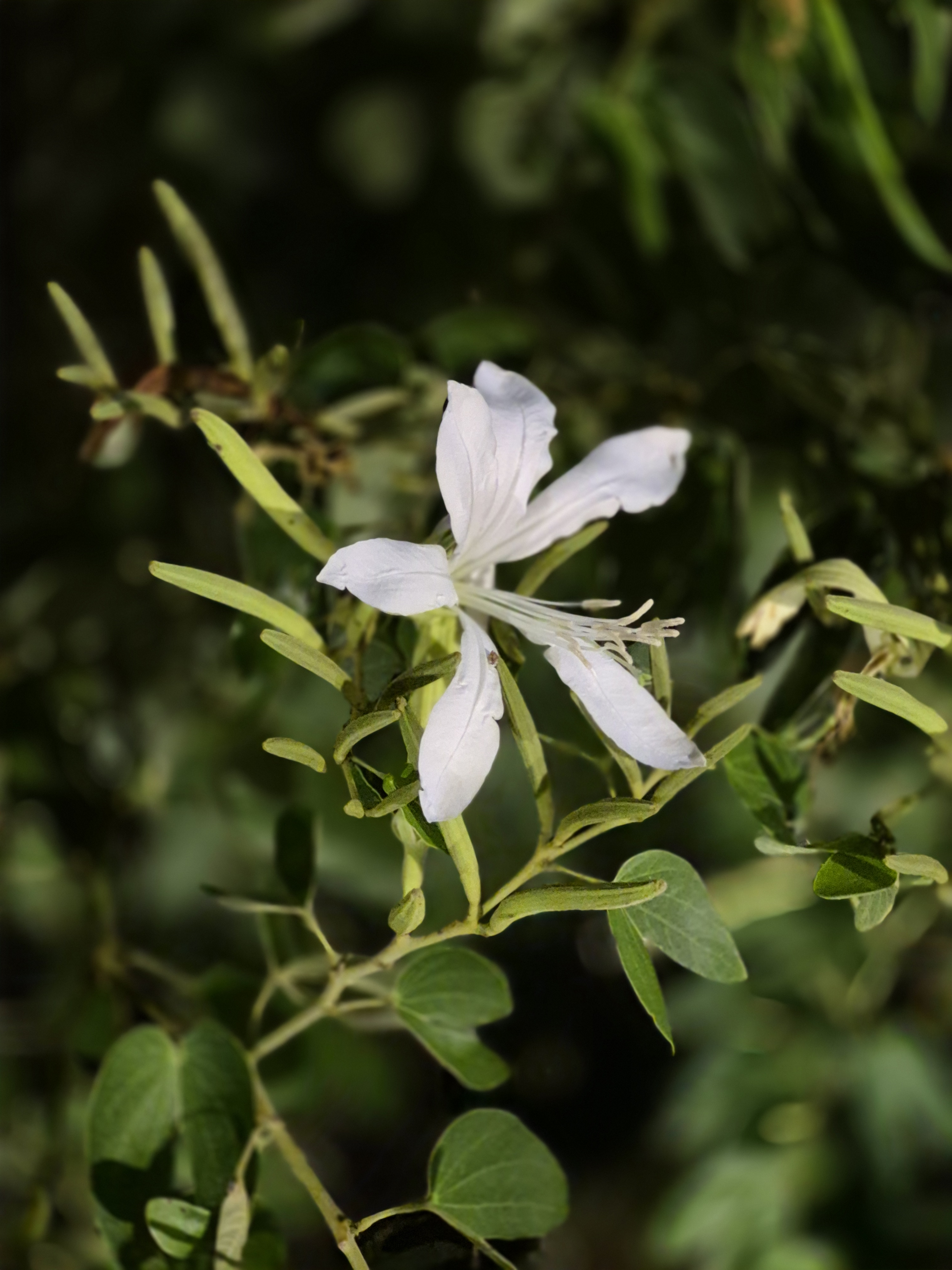
- Flower and small leaves

Scientific classification
- Kingdom: Plantae
- Clade: Embryophytes
- Clade: Tracheophytes
- Clade: Angiosperms
- Clade: Eudicots
- Clade: Rosids
- Order: Fabales
- Family: Fabaceae
- Genus: Bauhinia
- Species: B. forficata

Binomial name
- Bauhinia forficata Link

= Bauhinia forficata =

Species of legume

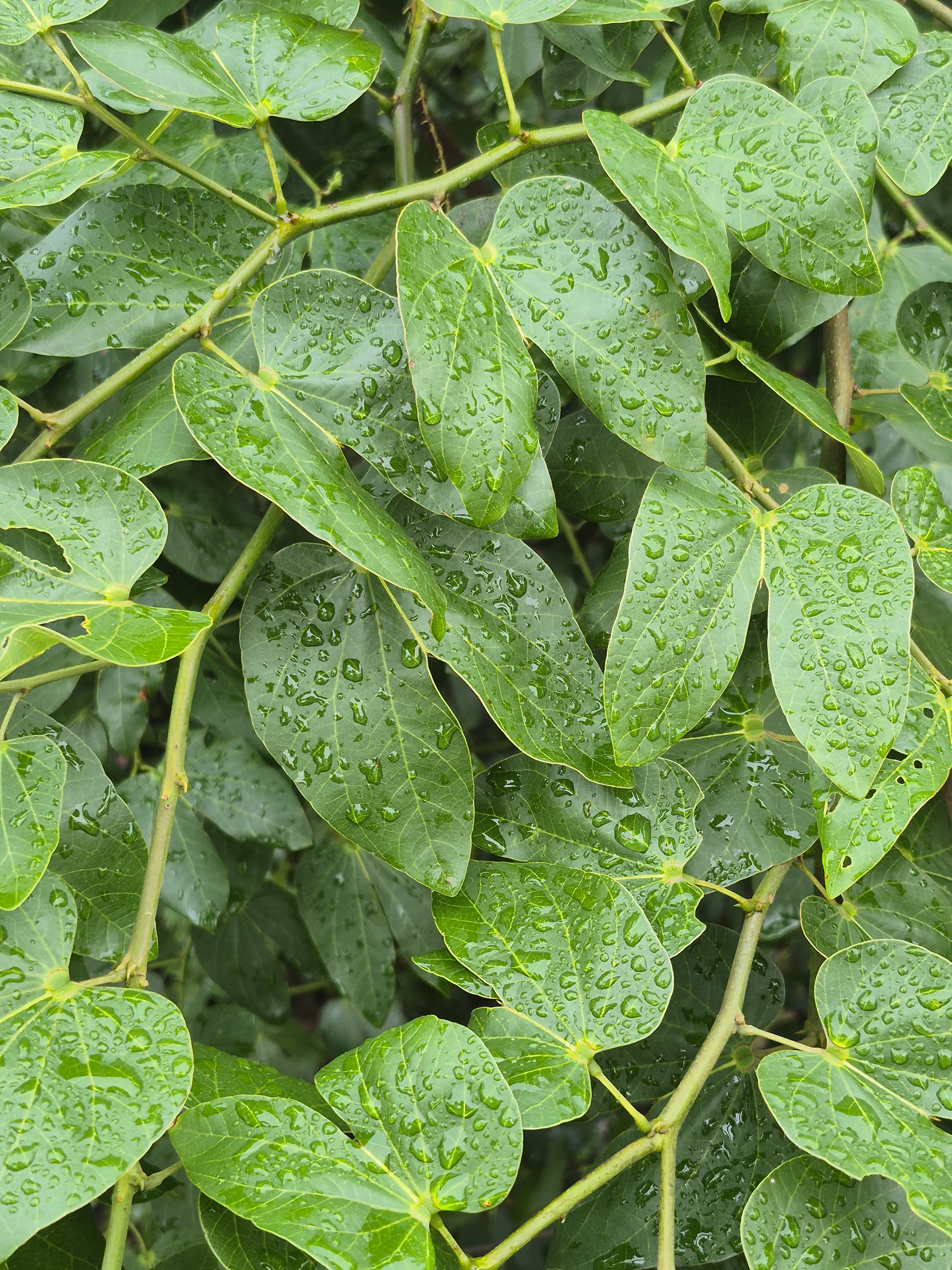
Leaves

Bauhinia forficata, commonly known as Brazilian orchid tree, is a species of flowering tree in the pea family, Fabaceae, that is native to South America.

== Taxonomy ==
Bauhinia forficata was formally described by the German botanist Johann Heinrich Friedrich Link. It belongs to the genus Bauhinia, a group comprising 187 species distributed throughout tropical regions of Africa, Asia, and South America. The species is a member of the Fabaceae family (also known as Leguminosae). The epithet forficata refers to this forked or cleft leaf form.

== Description ==
Bauhinia forficata is a medium-sized broadleaf evergreen tree that typically reaches a height of 25–30 feet (7.6–9.1 m) with a canopy spread ranging from 25–35 feet (7.6–10.7 m). The species displays a symmetrical crown that may take on a vase-shaped, rounded, or spreading form, and has a dense canopy with a medium texture. Growth is moderate under suitable conditions.

== Distribution and habitat ==
Bauhinia forficata is native to South America.

In Brazil, its natural range extends from the state of Rio de Janeiro to Rio Grande do Sul. Within the country, it occurs in diverse ecosystems, including the semi-arid Caatinga region, forest fragments in the state of Paraná, and along the Amazon coastal areas. It is also native to other parts of the continent, including central and northern Argentina, Bolivia, Paraguay and Uruguay.

It typically inhabits well-drained soils and performs best in full sun or areas with high, intermittent shade, such as beneath open pine canopies. Although it is tolerant of drought, the plant benefits from occasional irrigation or afternoon shade during hot, dry periods to prevent flower desiccation. In alkaline soils, it may exhibit interveinal chlorosis due to nutrient imbalances. Bauhinia forficata is suited to the United States Department of Agriculture (USDA) hardiness zones 10A through 11.
