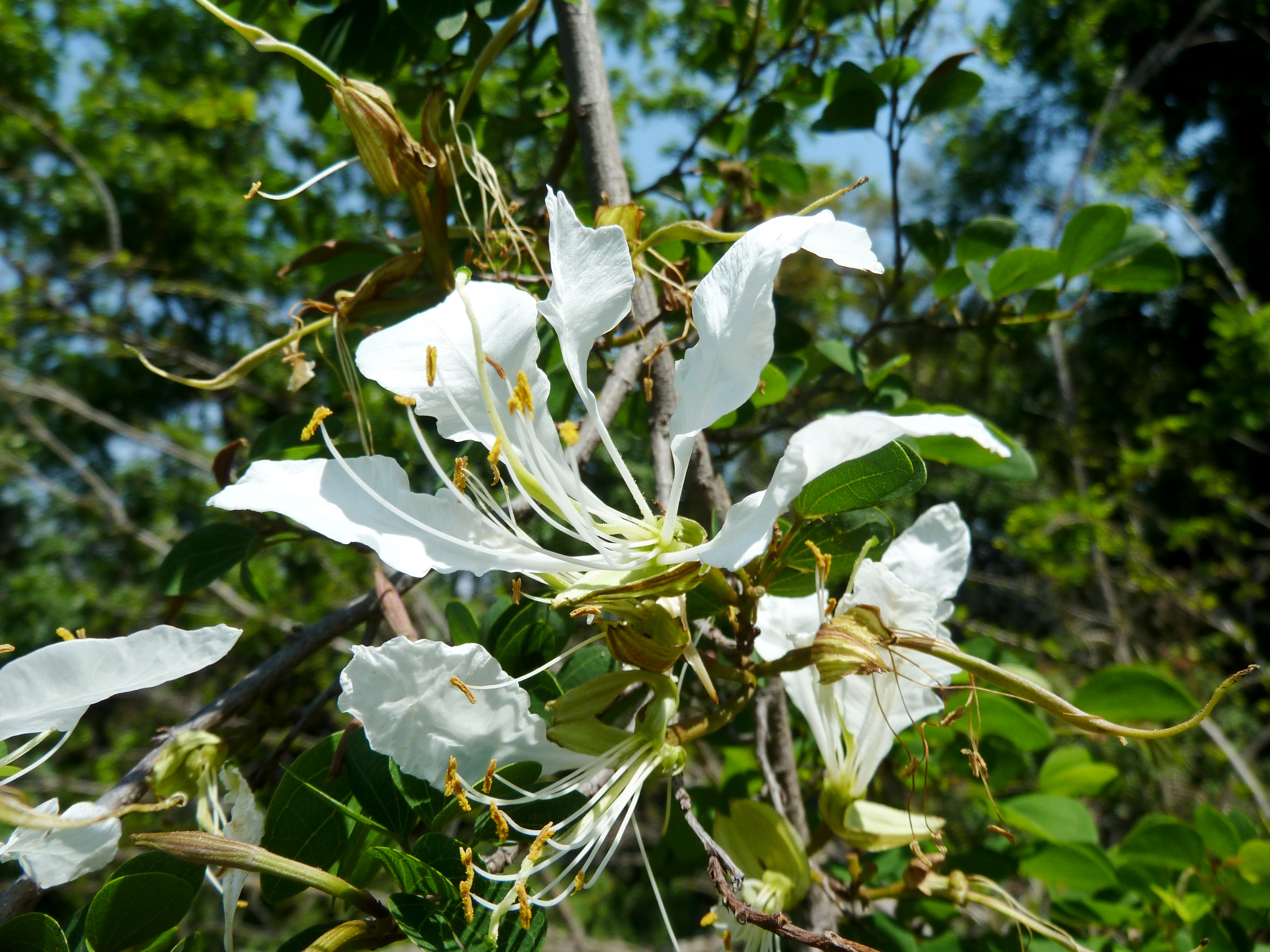

Conservation status
- Vulnerable (IUCN 3.1)

Scientific classification
- Kingdom: Plantae
- Clade: Tracheophytes
- Clade: Angiosperms
- Clade: Eudicots
- Clade: Rosids
- Order: Fabales
- Family: Fabaceae
- Genus: Bauhinia
- Species: B. bowkeri

Binomial name
- Bauhinia bowkeri Harv.

Synonyms
- Pauletia bowkeri (Harv.) A.Schmitz

= Bauhinia bowkeri =

Species of legume

Bauhinia bowkeri is a species of legume in the family Fabaceae. It is a scrambling shrub or small tree native to the Cape Provinces and KwaZulu-Natal in South Africa, where it is threatened by habitat loss.
