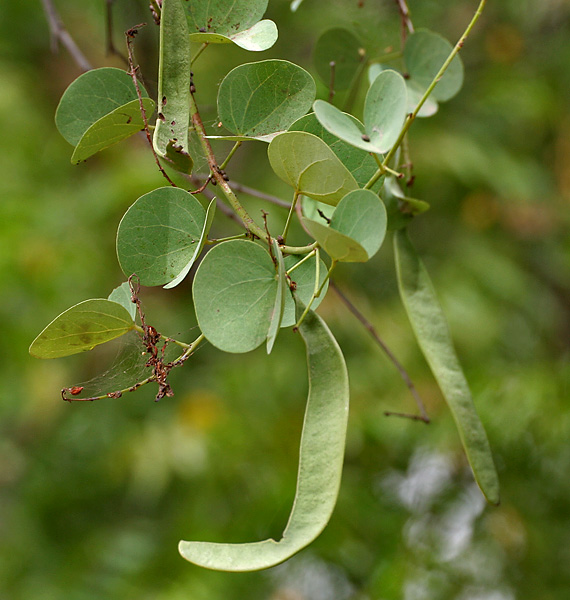

Scientific classification
- Kingdom: Plantae
- Clade: Embryophytes
- Clade: Tracheophytes
- Clade: Angiosperms
- Clade: Eudicots
- Clade: Rosids
- Order: Fabales
- Family: Fabaceae
- Genus: Bauhinia
- Species: B. racemosa

Binomial name
- Bauhinia racemosa Lam.

Synonyms
- Pauletia racemosa (Lam.) A.Schmitz; Piliostigma racemosum (Lam.) Benth.; Telestria racemosa (Lam.) Raf.; Bauhinia parviflora Vahl; Bauhinia spicata Rottler ex Biehler; Bauhinia tenuis Span.; Bauhinia timorana Baker; Bauhinia timorensis Decne.

= Bauhinia racemosa =

Species of legume

Bauhinia racemosa, commonly known as the bidi leaf tree, is a rare medicinal species of flowering shrub with religious significance. It is a small crooked tree with drooping branches that grows 3–5 metres (10–16 ft) tall and flowers between February and May. It is native to Southeast Asia, the Indian subcontinent and China.

== Description ==
The tree's leaves are relatively small and wide, with dimensions ranging from 2 to 5 cm in length and 2.5 to 6.3 cm in width. A cleft divides each leaf into two rounded globes. The flowers appear in terminal racemes, measuring 5 to 12.5 cm in length. The pods are stalked, smooth, and turgid, featuring a blunt apex and a tapered base. Ripe pods exhibit a dark brown color, are indehiscent, and house 12 to 20 seeds. The bark is scabrous, displaying vertical cracks, and has a bluish-black hue. The tree blossoms between March and June, and its pods mature in November-December, persisting on the tree for several additional months.

== Ecology ==
The immature seeds of the tree are consumed by the grizzled giant squirrel.

== Religious significance ==
In Hindu families it is customary to exchange leaves of the Aapta tree on the Hindu festive day of Dussehra. An act known as exchanging Gold—pointing to the special significance of the plant on that particular day. This is also why the tree is often referred to as Sonpatta (literal translation: leaves of gold).

== Other uses ==
The leaves are used in the production of beedi, a thin Indian and Sri Lankan cigarillo.
