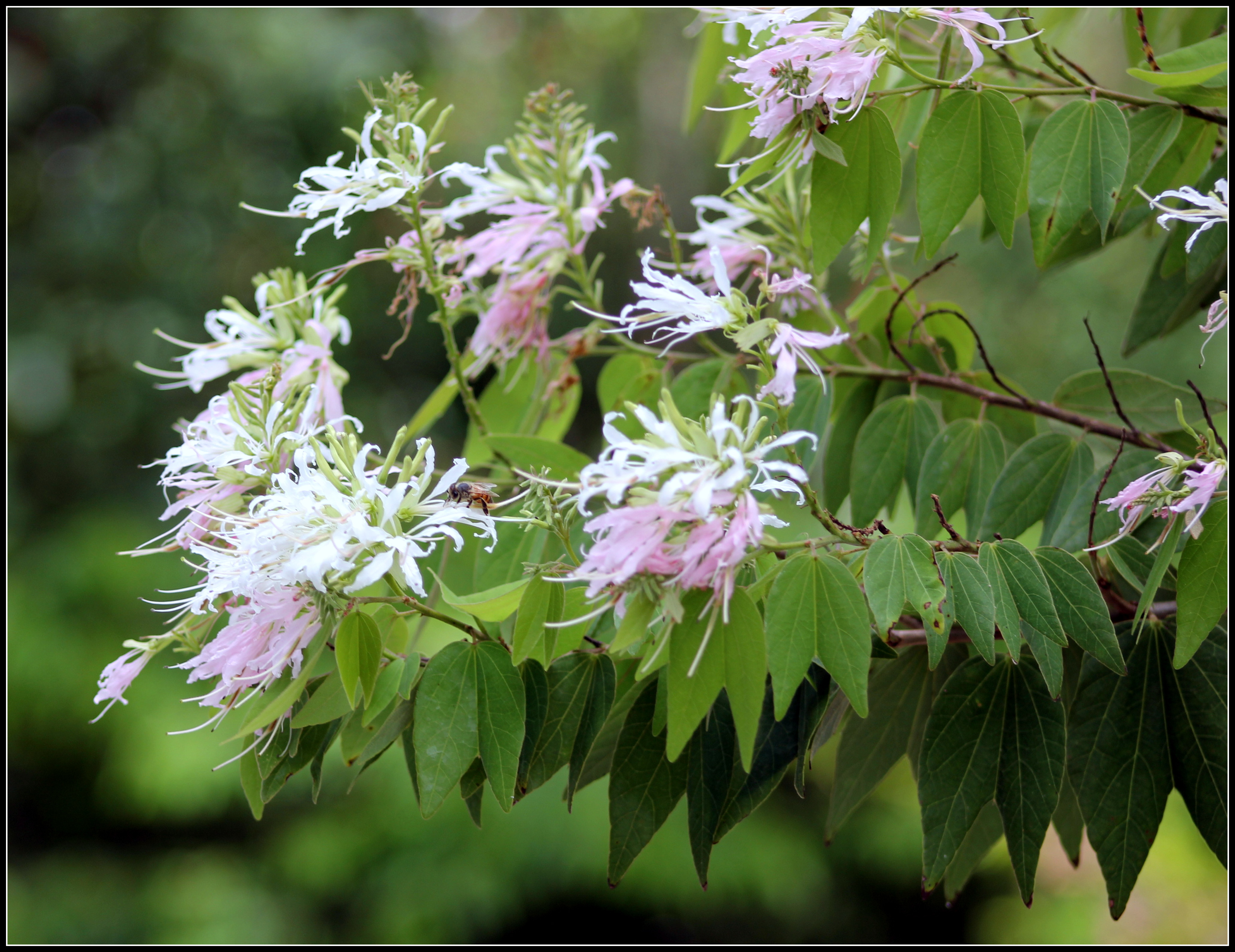
- Flowers
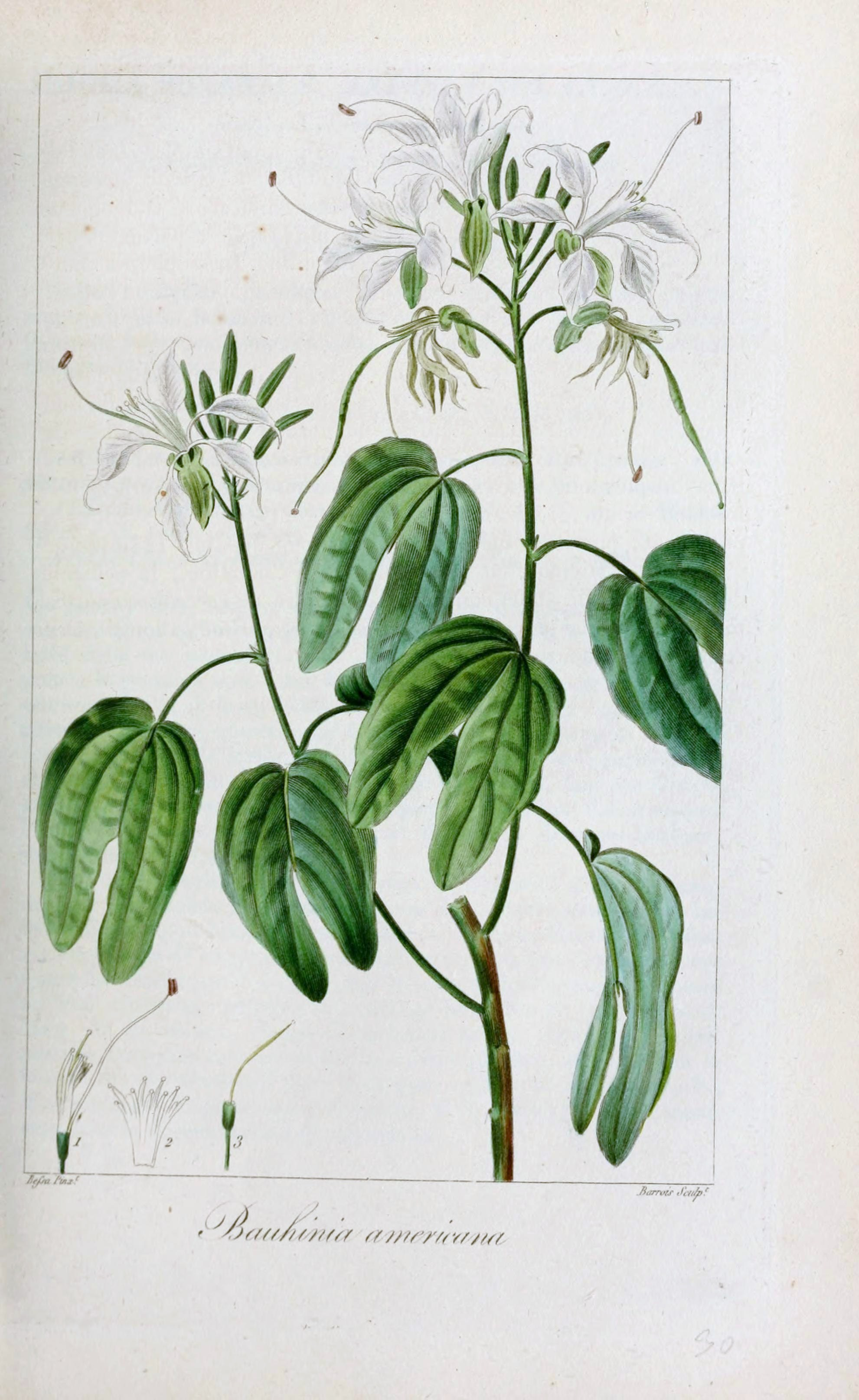
- Botanical illustration

Conservation status
- Least Concern (IUCN 3.1)

Scientific classification
- Kingdom: Plantae
- Clade: Embryophytes
- Clade: Tracheophytes
- Clade: Angiosperms
- Clade: Eudicots
- Clade: Rosids
- Order: Fabales
- Family: Fabaceae
- Genus: Bauhinia
- Species: B. divaricata

Binomial name
- Bauhinia divaricata L.

Synonyms
- List: Bauhinia amblyophylla Harms; Bauhinia aurita Aiton; Bauhinia caribaea Jenn.; Bauhinia confusa Rose; Bauhinia divaricata var. angustiloba Ekman ex Urb.; Bauhinia furcata Desv.; Bauhinia goldmanii Rose; Bauhinia lamarckiana DC.; Bauhinia latifolia Cav.; Bauhinia mexicana Vogel; Bauhinia oaxacana (Britton) Standl.; Bauhinia peninsularis Brandegee; Bauhinia porrecta Sw.; Bauhinia racemifera Desf.; Bauhinia retusa Poir.; Bauhinia schlechtendaliana M.Martens & Galeotti; Bauhinia versicolor Bertol.; Casparia amblyophylla (Harms) Britton & Rose; Casparia aurita (Aiton) Griseb.; Casparia confusa (Rose) Britton & Rose; Casparia divaricata (L.) Kunth ex Britton & Rose; Casparia latifolia (Cav.) Kunth ex Seem.; Casparia mexicana (Vogel) Britton & Rose; Casparia oaxacana Britton; Casparia peninsularis (Brandegee) Britton & Rose; Casparia porrecta (Sw.) Kunth ex Griseb.; Casparia schlechtendaliana (M.Martens & Galeotti) Britton & Rose; Casparia versicolor (Bertol.) Britton & Rose; Mandarus divaricata (L.) Raf.

= Bauhinia divaricata =

Species of flowering plant

Bauhinia divaricata, the bull hoof or Mexican orchid tree, is a species of flowering plant in the family Fabaceae. It is native to Mexico, Central America (except Panama), and the Caribbean.
