= Bauhinia mombassae =

Conservation status
- Endangered (IUCN 3.1)

Scientific classification
- Kingdom: Plantae
- Clade: Tracheophytes
- Clade: Angiosperms
- Clade: Eudicots
- Clade: Rosids
- Order: Fabales
- Family: Fabaceae
- Genus: Bauhinia
- Species: B. mombassae

Binomial name
- Bauhinia mombassae Vatke

Synonyms
- Bauhinia loeseneriana Harms

Species of legume

Bauhinia mombassae is a species of plant in the family Fabaceae. It is found in Kenya and Tanzania. It is threatened by habitat loss.
