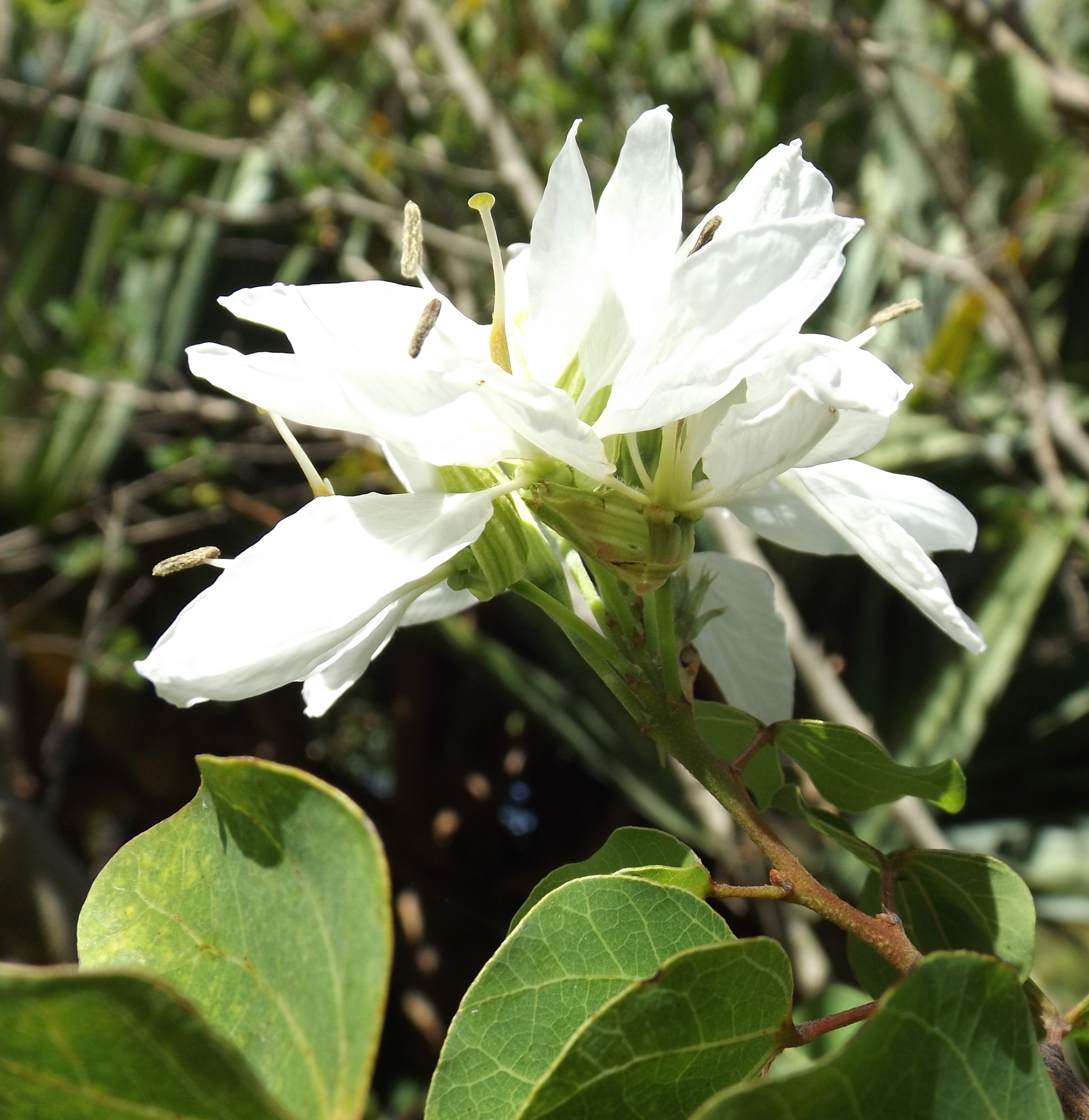

Scientific classification
- Kingdom: Plantae
- Clade: Tracheophytes
- Clade: Angiosperms
- Clade: Eudicots
- Clade: Rosids
- Order: Fabales
- Family: Fabaceae
- Genus: Bauhinia
- Species: B. lunarioides

Binomial name
- Bauhinia lunarioides A.Gray ex S.Watson

Synonyms
- Bauhinia congesta (Britton & Rose) Lundell; Casparia congesta Britton & Rose

= Bauhinia lunarioides =

Species of legume

Bauhinia lunarioides is a species of flowering plant in the family Fabaceae, native to Southwestern Texas in the United States and Northern Mexico. Common names include Texasplume, Anacacho orchid tree, and pata de vaca.

It is a small deciduous tree growing to 4 m tall. The leaves are 2–5 cm long and broad, rounded, and bilobed at the base and apex. The flowers are small, white or (rarely) pink, with five petals. The fruit is a pod.

Though limited in range in the wild, it has become increasingly available in nurseries.
