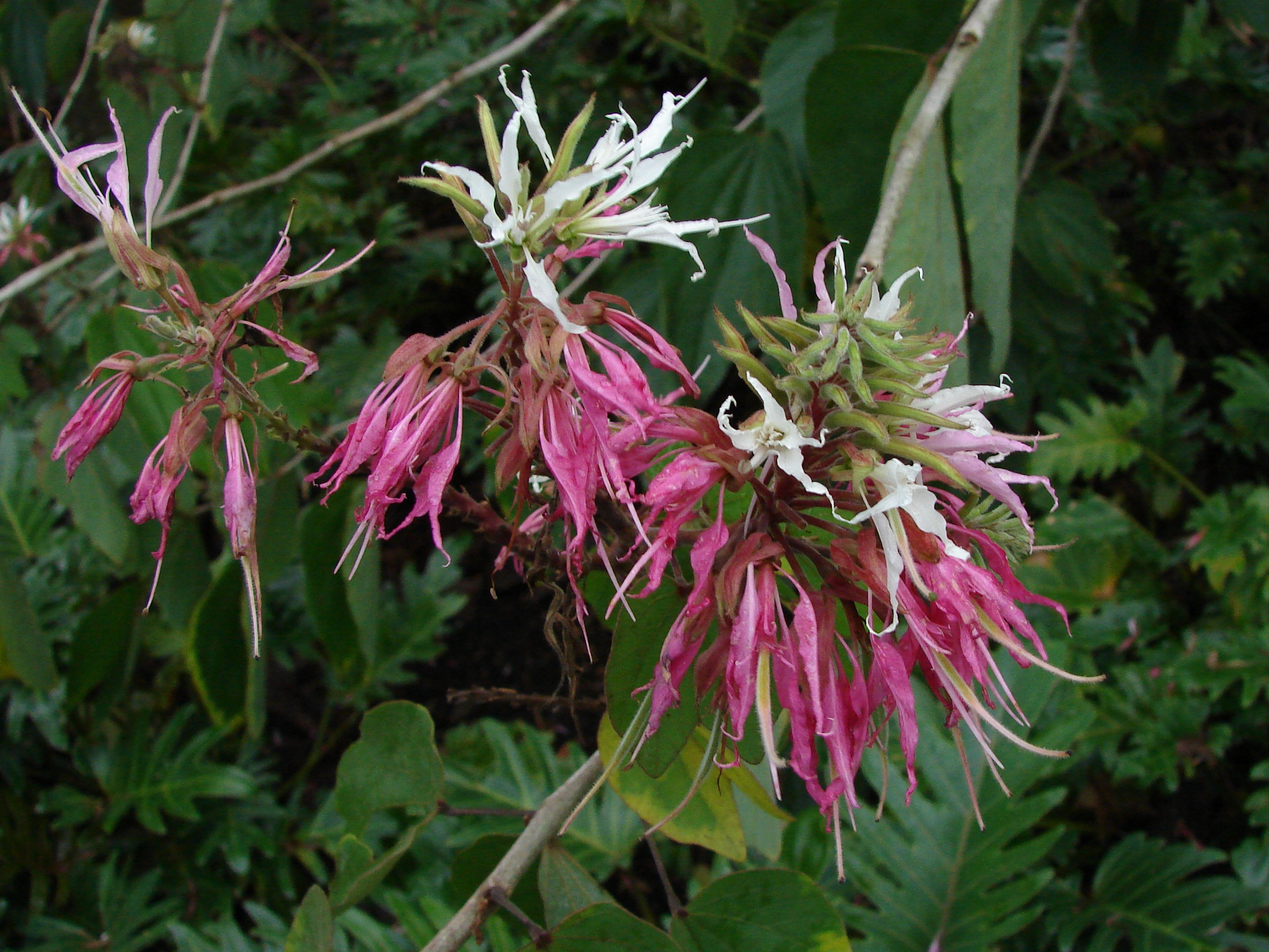
- Bauhinia divaricata flowers

Scientific classification
- Kingdom: Plantae
- Clade: Tracheophytes
- Clade: Angiosperms
- Clade: Eudicots
- Clade: Rosids
- Order: Fabales
- Family: Fabaceae
- Subfamily: Cercidoideae
- Tribe: Bauhinieae
- Genus: Bauhinia; L.

Type species
- Bauhinia divaricata Plum. ex L.

Species
- 187 – see text

Synonyms
- Alvesia Welw.; Amaria Mutis ex Caldas; Ariaria Cuervo; Bracteolanthus de Wit; Cansenia Raf.; Caspareopsis Britton & Rose; Casparia Kunth; Mandarus Raf.; Monoteles Raf.; Pauletia Cav.; Perlebia Mart.

= Bauhinia =

Bauhinia Temporal range: Late Paleocene to recent

Genus of flowering plants

Bauhinia (/boʊˈhɪniə/) is a large genus of flowering plants in the subfamily Cercidoideae and tribe Bauhinieae, in the large flowering plant family Fabaceae, with a pantropical distribution. The genus was named after the Bauhin brothers Gaspard and Johann, Swiss-French botanists.

Many species are widely planted in the tropics as orchid trees, particularly in India, Sri Lanka, Vietnam, Nepal and south-eastern China. Other common names include mountain ebony and kachnar. Before the family was reorganised, a number of genera including the lianas of genus Phanera were placed here (see related genera). In the United States, the trees grow in Hawaii, coastal California, Arizona, Texas, Louisiana, and Florida. There are native species, like Bauhinia lunarioides that are widely planted in the Southwest as a landscape plant.

Parts of some species of bauhinia like B. purpurea and B. malabarica are used in Filipino cuisine (known collectively as alinbánban or alinbángbang, "butterfly").

Bauhinia × blakeana is the floral emblem of Hong Kong—a stylized orchid tree flower appears on the flag of Hong Kong. Hong Kong Airlines (formerly CR Airways) also uses 'Bauhinia' as its radio callsign in air traffic communication, which appears in its logo.

== Description ==
Bauhinia trees typically reach a height of 6–12 m and their branches spread 3–6 m outwards. The lobed leaves usually are 10–15 cm across.

The five-petaled flowers are 7.5–12.5 cm in diameter, generally in shades of red, pink, purple, orange, or yellow, and are often fragrant. The tree begins flowering in late winter and often continues to flower into early summer.

== Cultivation ==
Propagation of Bauhinia species is from seeds or cuttings. They thrive in alkaline soils and do not tolerate salty conditions. Full sun exposure is preferred but they can be grown under partial sun. Generous watering is needed during summer; moderate moisture required in winter.

== Species ==
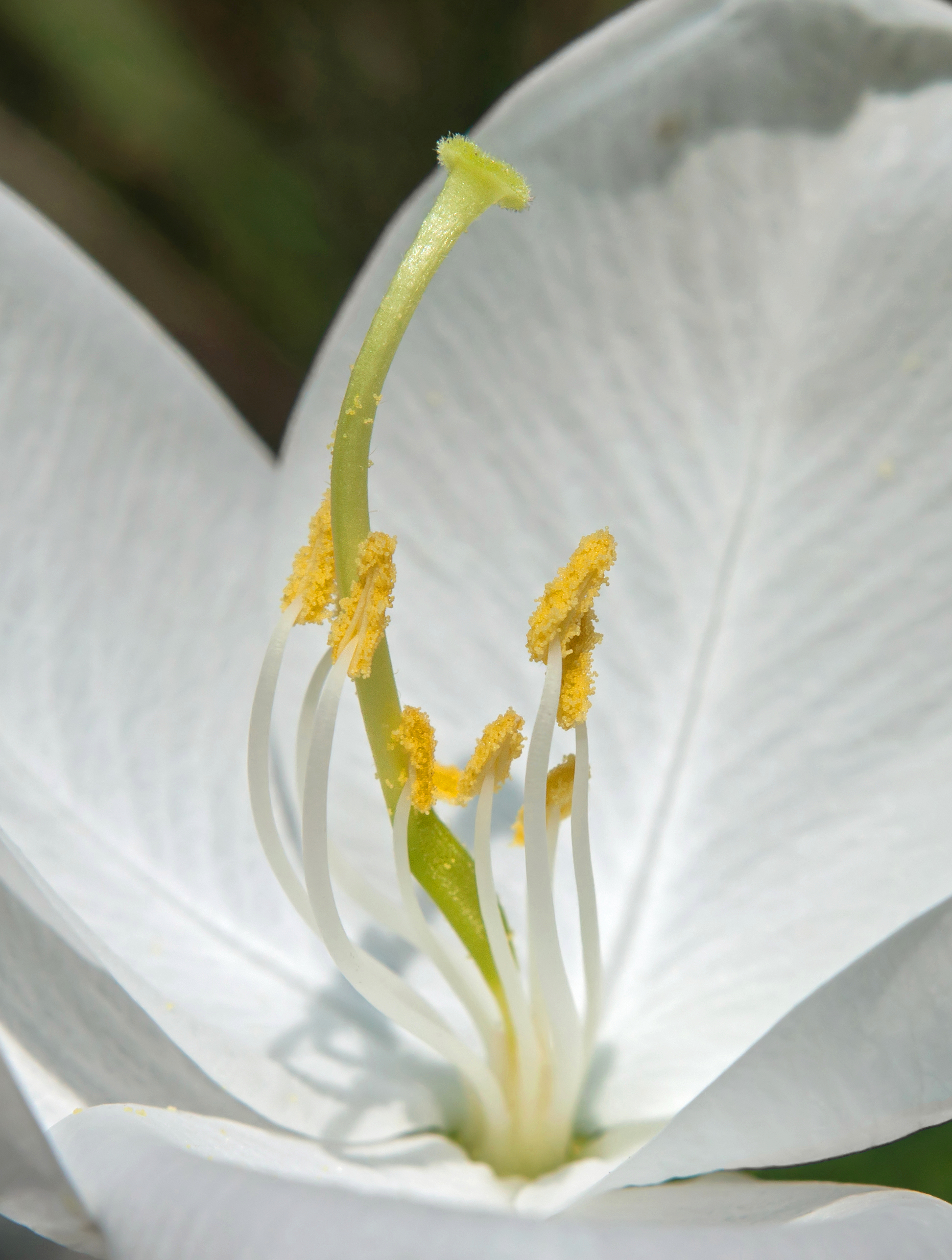
Bauhinia acuminata

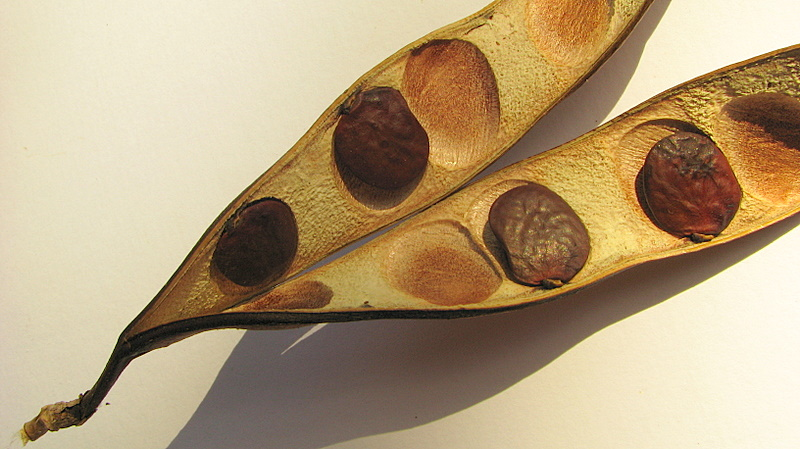
Bauhinia corifolia fruit

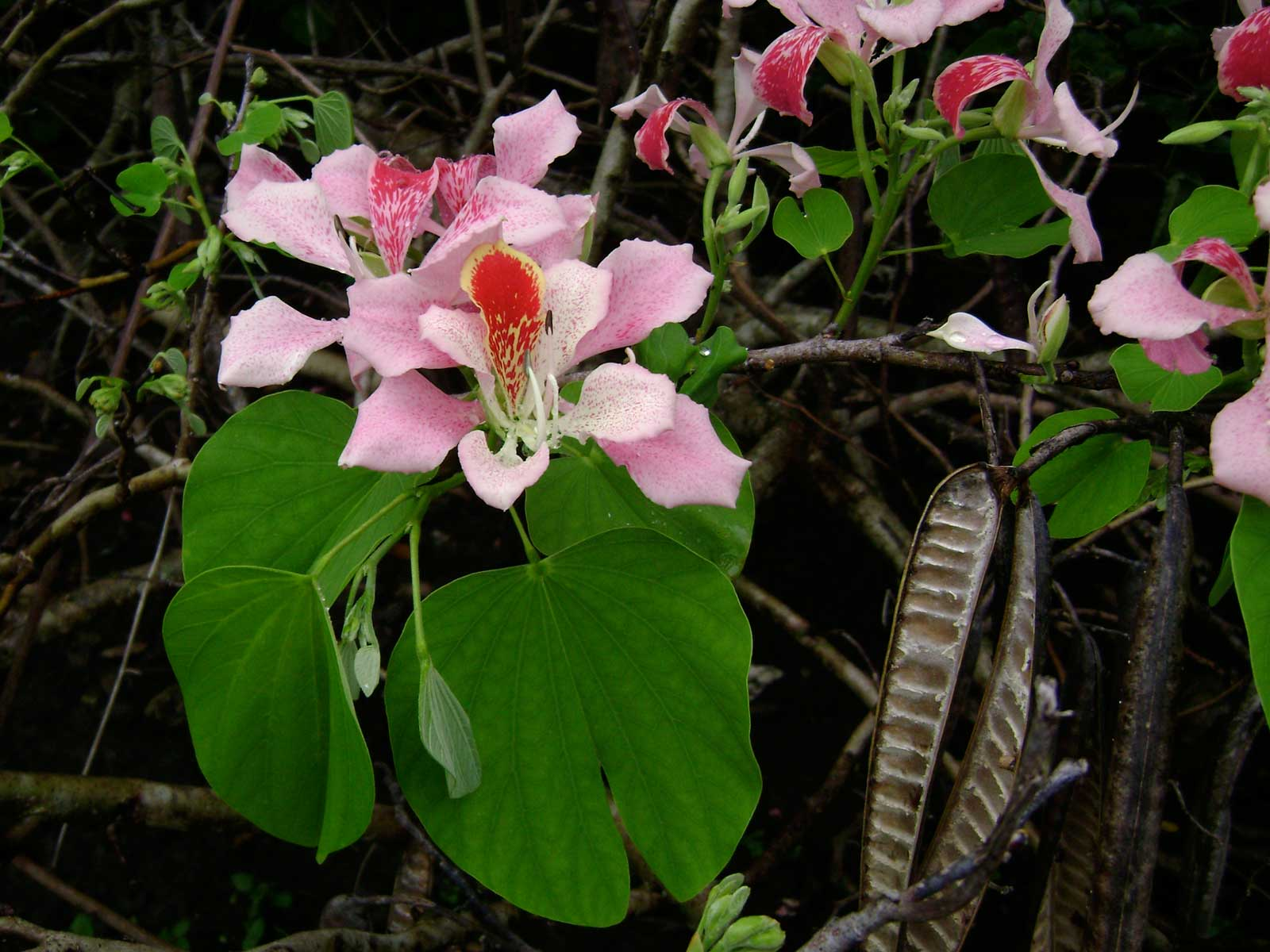
Bauhinia monandra

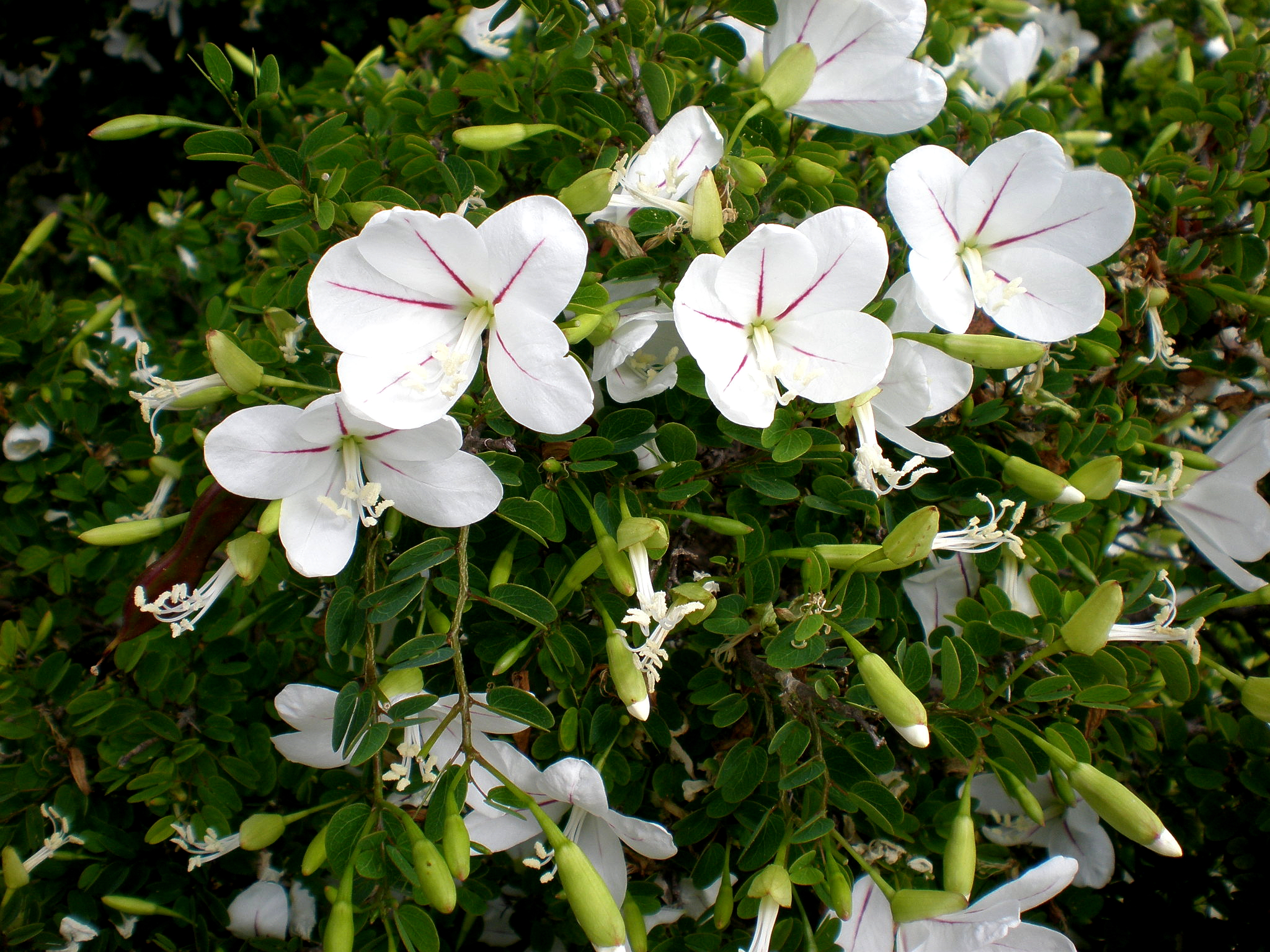
Bauhinia natalensis

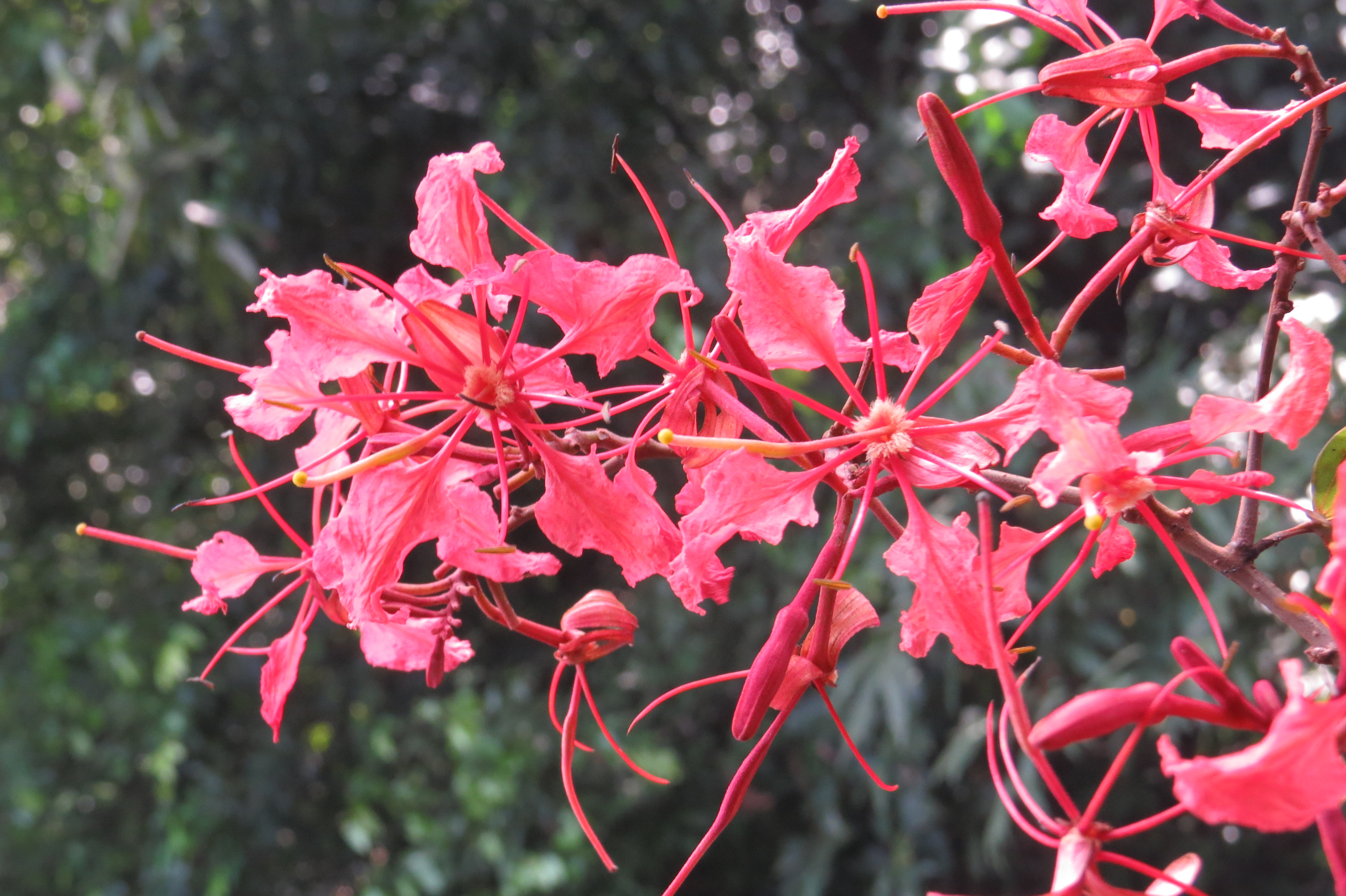
Bauhinia phoenicea

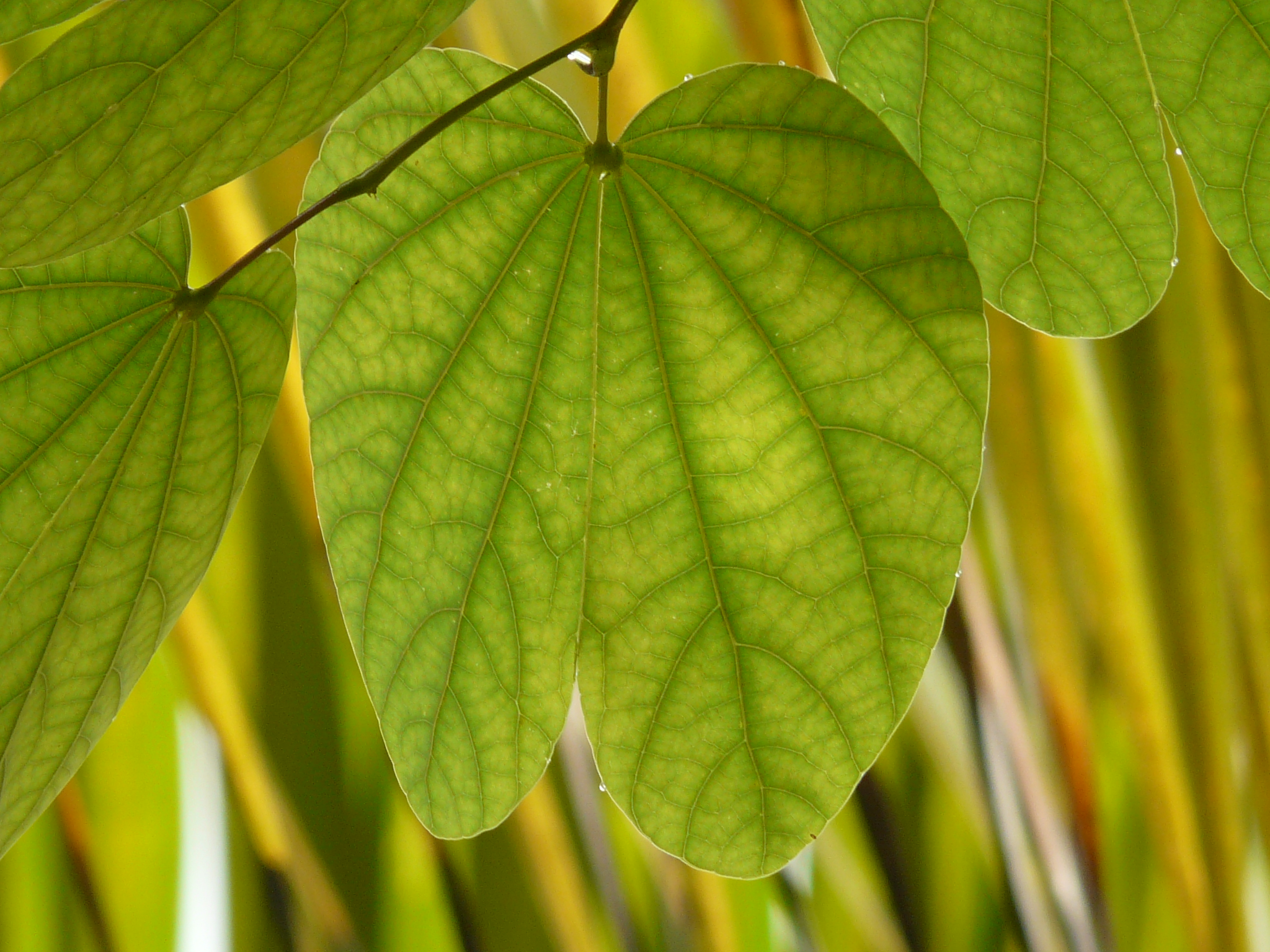
Bauhinia purpurea

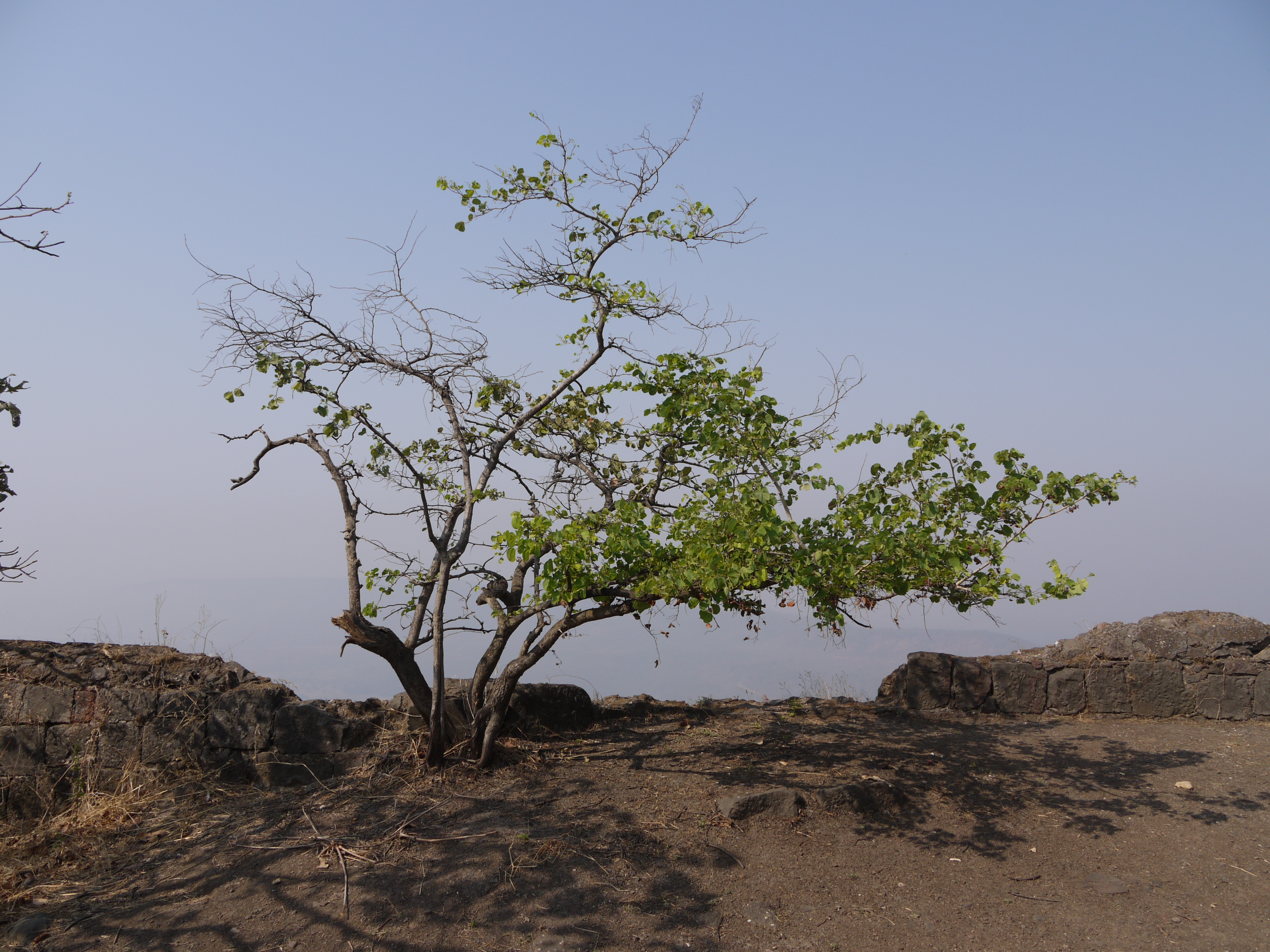
Bauhinia racemosa

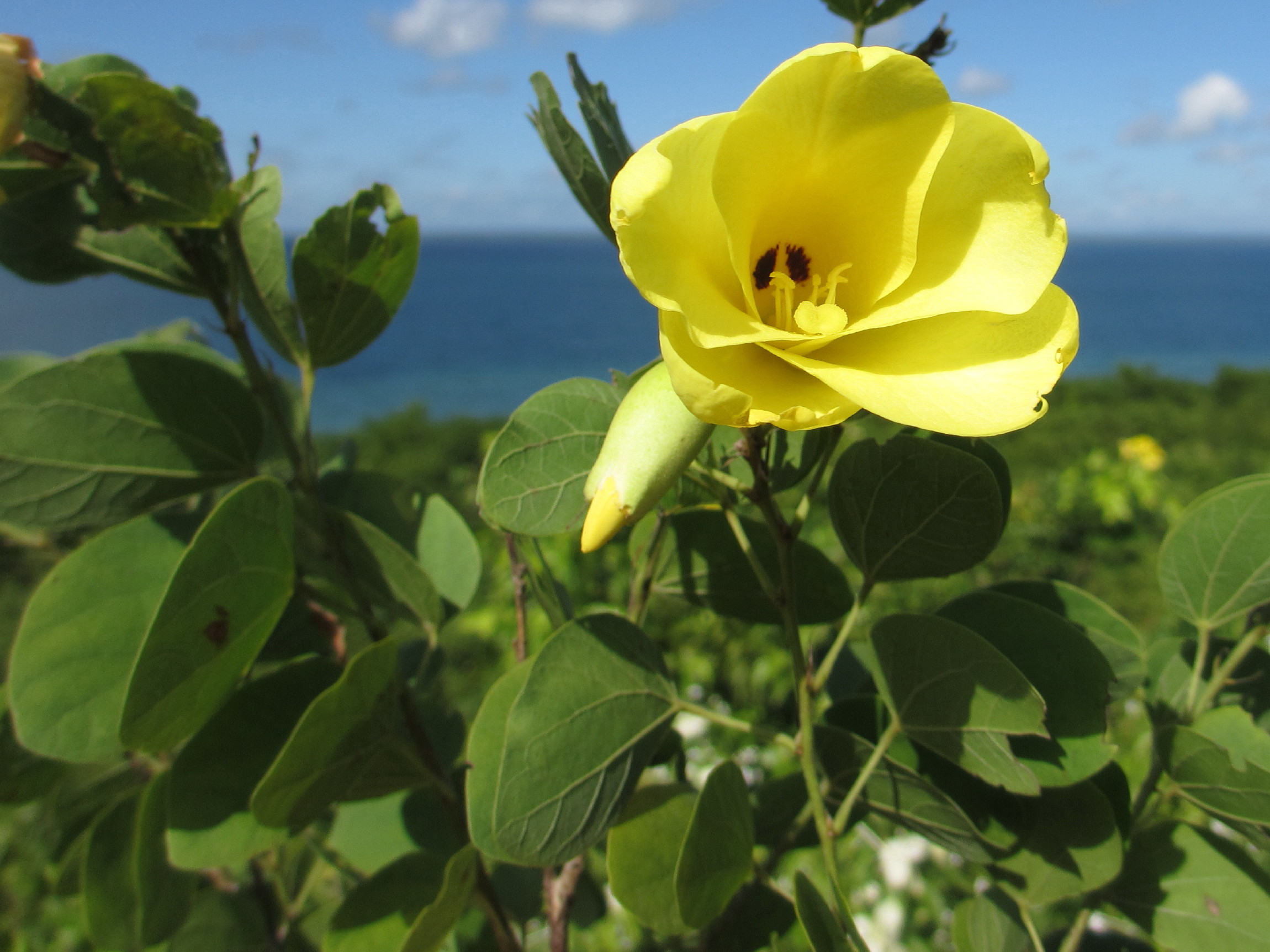
Bauhinia tomentosa

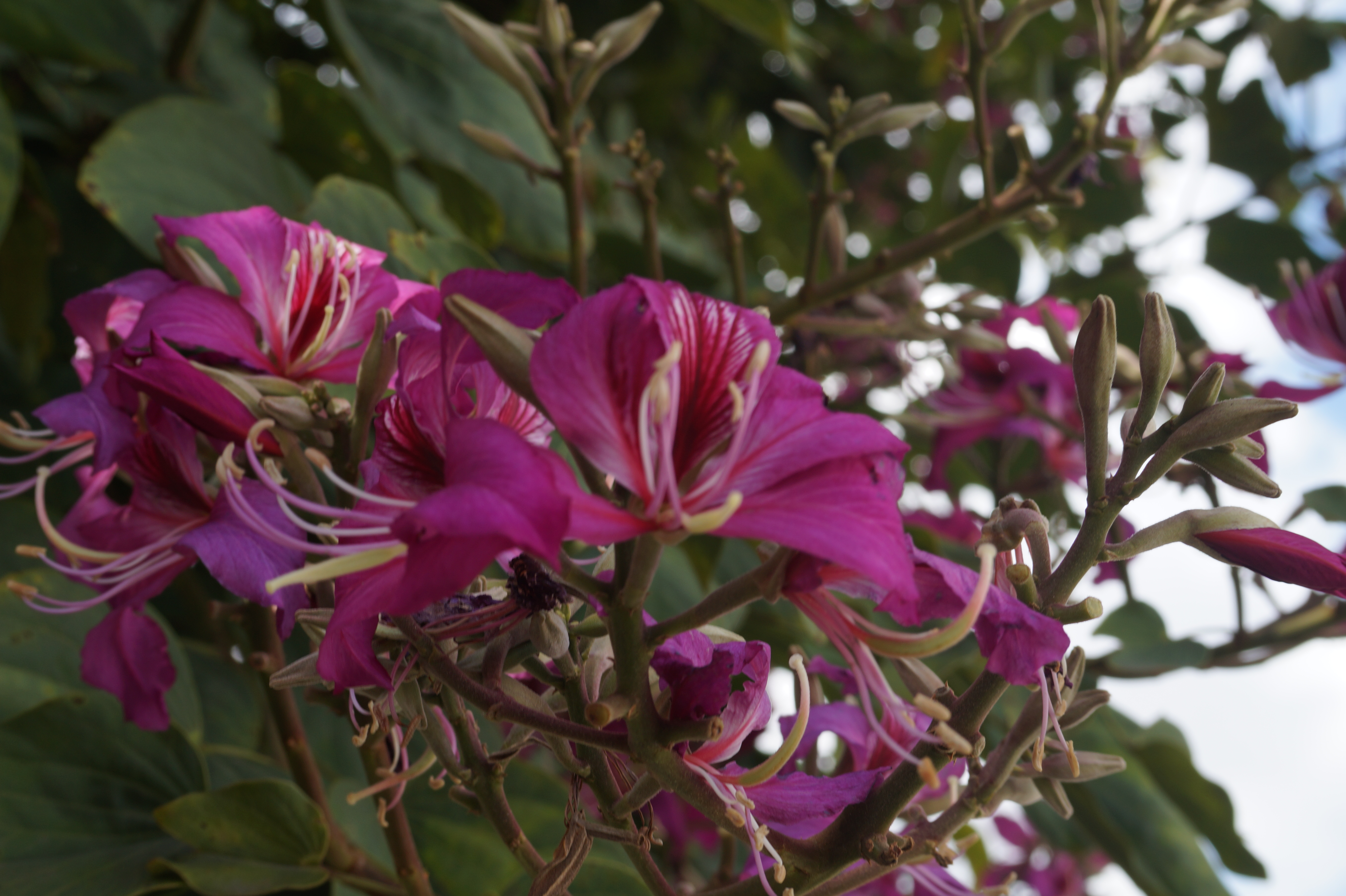
Flower of Bauhinia x blakeana

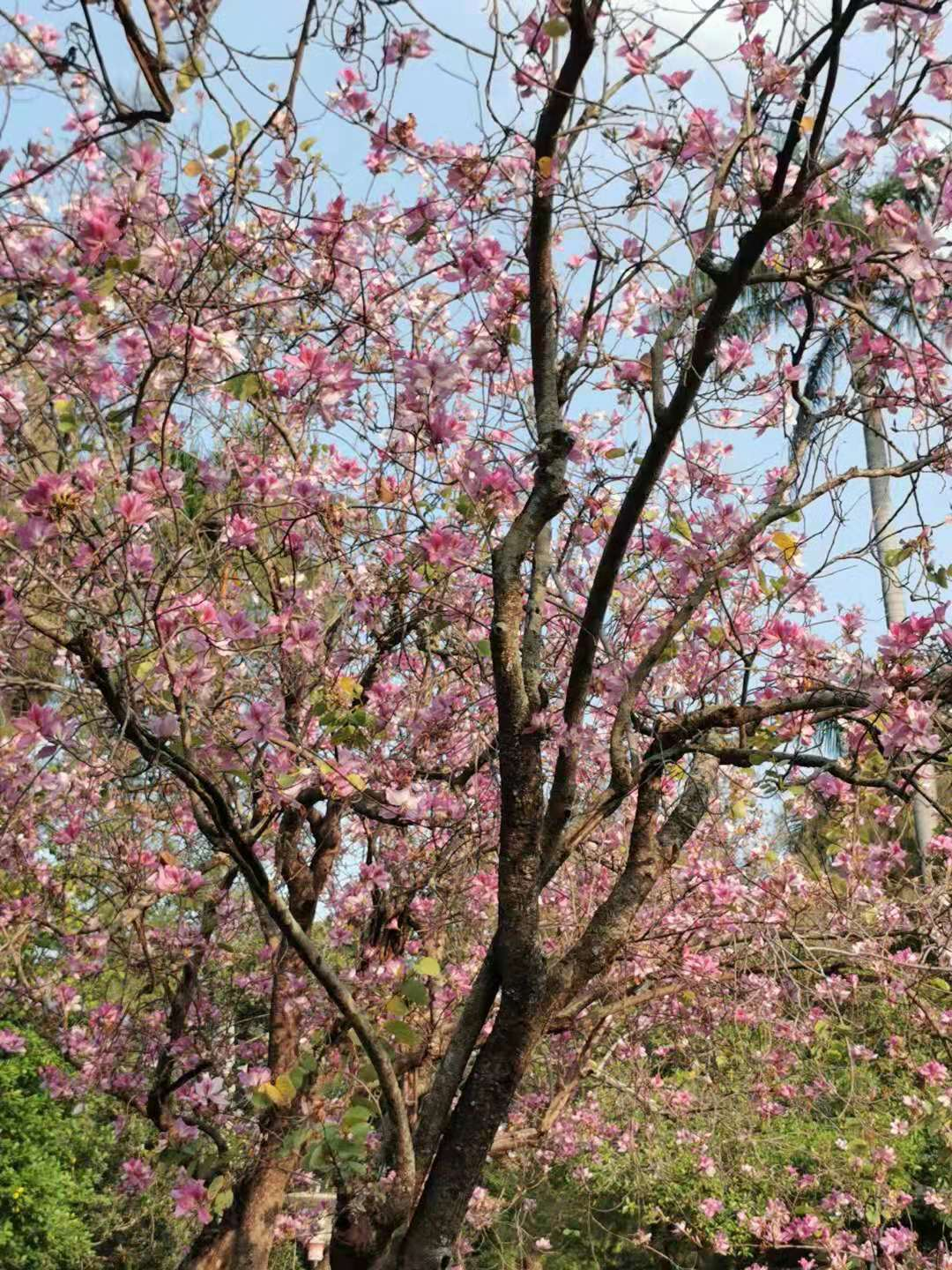
Bauhinia variegata is almost leafless during flowering. Bauhinia purpurea and Bauhinia blakeana, which are often confused with B. variegata, are leafy during flowering.

As of December 2025, Plants of the World Online accepts the following 187 species:

- Bauhinia acreana Harms
- Bauhinia aculeata L.
- Bauhinia acuminata L.
- Bauhinia acuruana Moric.
- Bauhinia affinis Vogel
- Bauhinia albicans Vogel
- Bauhinia amambayensis Fortunato
- Bauhinia amatlana Wunderlin
- Bauhinia andrade-limae A.C.B.Santos & Vaz
- Bauhinia andrieuxii Hemsl.
- Bauhinia ankarafantsikae Du Puy & R.Rabev.
- Bauhinia anomala Hassl.
- Bauhinia arborea Wunderlin
- Bauhinia argentinensis Burkart
- Bauhinia arleneae A.C.B.Santos & L.P.Queiroz
- Bauhinia augusti Harms
- Bauhinia aurantiaca Bojer
- Bauhinia aureopunctata Ducke
- Bauhinia ayabacensis Wunderlin
- Bauhinia bartlettii B.L.Turner
- Bauhinia bauhinioides (Mart.) J.F.Macbr.
- Bauhinia beguinotii Cufod.
- Bauhinia bicolor (Bong.) D.Dietr.
- Bauhinia bombaciflora Ducke
- Bauhinia bowkeri Harv.
- Bauhinia brachycalyx Ducke
- Bauhinia brachycarpa Wall. ex Benth.
- Bauhinia brevicalyx Du Puy & R.Rabev.
- Bauhinia brevipes Vogel
- Bauhinia bryoniflora Franch.
- Bauhinia burchellii Benth.
- Bauhinia burrowsii E.J.D.Schmidt
- Bauhinia buscalionii Mattei
- Bauhinia calliandroides Rusby
- Bauhinia caloneura Malme
- Bauhinia campestris Malme
- Bauhinia candelabriformis R.S.Cowan
- Bauhinia capuronii Du Puy & R.Rabev.
- Bauhinia catingae Harms
- Bauhinia chapulhuacania Wunderlin
- Bauhinia cheilantha (Bong.) Steud.
- Bauhinia cinnamomea DC.
- Bauhinia coclensis R.Torres
- Bauhinia conceptionis Britton & Killip
- Bauhinia concinna Drake
- Bauhinia conwayi Rusby
- Bauhinia cookii Rose
- Bauhinia corifolia L.P.Queiroz
- Bauhinia corniculata Benth.
- Bauhinia coulteri J.F.Macbr.
- Bauhinia crocea Drake
- Bauhinia cupulata Benth.
- Bauhinia curvula Benth.
- Bauhinia darainensis Thulin & Nusb.
- Bauhinia decandra Du Puy & R.Rabev.
- Bauhinia decora L.Uribe
- Bauhinia deserti (Britton & Rose) Lundell
- Bauhinia dimorphophylla Hoehne
- Bauhinia dipetala Hemsl.
- Bauhinia diptera Blume ex Miq.
- Bauhinia divaricata L.
- Bauhinia dubia G.Don
- Bauhinia dumosa Benth.
- Bauhinia eilertsii Pulle
- Bauhinia ellenbeckii Harms
- Bauhinia erythrocalyx Wunderlin
- Bauhinia esmeraldasensis Wunderlin
- Bauhinia estrellensis Hassl.
- Bauhinia eucosma S.F.Blake
- Bauhinia euryantha H.Y.Chen
- Bauhinia exellii Torre & Hillc.
- Bauhinia eximia Miq.
- Bauhinia farec Desv.
- Bauhinia flagelliflora Wunderlin
- Bauhinia floribunda Desv.
- Bauhinia forficata Link
- Bauhinia fryxellii Wunderlin
- Bauhinia funchiana Vaz & G.P.Lewis
- Bauhinia fusconervis (Bong.) Steud.
- Bauhinia galpinii N.E.Br.
- Bauhinia gardneri Benth.
- Bauhinia geniculata Wunderlin
- Bauhinia gilesii F.Muell. & F.M.Bailey
- Bauhinia glaziovii Taub.
- Bauhinia goyazensis Harms
- Bauhinia grandidieri Baill.
- Bauhinia grandifolia (Bong.) D.Dietr.
- Bauhinia grevei Drake
- Bauhinia gypsicola McVaugh
- Bauhinia hagenbeckii Harms
- Bauhinia haughtii Wunderlin
- Bauhinia hildebrandtii Vatke
- Bauhinia hirsuta Weinm.
- Bauhinia holophylla (Bong.) Steud.
- Bauhinia hostmanniana Miq.
- Bauhinia humilis Rusby
- Bauhinia integerrima Mart. ex Benth.
- Bauhinia isopetala Griff.
- Bauhinia jenningsii P.Wilson
- Bauhinia jucunda Brandegee
- Bauhinia kalantha Harms
- Bauhinia kleiniana Burkart
- Bauhinia leptantha Malme
- Bauhinia leucantha Thulin
- Bauhinia longicuspis Spruce ex Benth.
- Bauhinia longifolia (Bong.) Steud.
- Bauhinia longipedicellata Ducke
- Bauhinia longiracemosa Hayata
- Bauhinia lunarioides A.Gray ex S.Watson
- Bauhinia macrantha Oliv.
- Bauhinia macranthera Benth. ex Hemsl.
- Bauhinia madagascariensis Desv.
- Bauhinia malacotricha Harms
- Bauhinia malacotrichoides R.S.Cowan
- Bauhinia malmeana Vaz & G.P.Lewis
- Bauhinia marginata (Bong.) Steud.
- Bauhinia melastomatoidea R.Torres
- Bauhinia membranacea Benth.
- Bauhinia mendoncae Torre & Hillc.
- Bauhinia miriamae R.Torres
- Bauhinia mollis (Bong.) D.Dietr.
- Bauhinia mombassae Vatke
- Bauhinia monandra Kurz
- Bauhinia moningerae Merr.
- Bauhinia morondavensis Du Puy & R.Rabev.
- Bauhinia multinervia (Kunth) DC.
- Bauhinia natalensis Oliv.
- Bauhinia ombrophila Du Puy & R.Rabev.
- Bauhinia orbiculata A.C.B.Santos & L.P.Queiroz
- Bauhinia ovata (Bong.) Vogel
- Bauhinia pansamalana Donn.Sm.
- Bauhinia parkinsonii C.E.C.Fisch.
- Bauhinia parviloba Ducke
- Bauhinia pauletia Pers.
- Bauhinia pentandra (Bong.) Vogel ex Steud.
- Bauhinia pervilleana Baill.
- Bauhinia pes-caprae Cav.
- Bauhinia petersiana Bolle
- Bauhinia petiolata (Mutis ex DC.) Triana ex Hook.
- Bauhinia phoenicea B.Heyne ex Wight & Arn.
- Bauhinia pichinchensis Wunderlin
- Bauhinia picta (Kunth) DC.
- Bauhinia pinheiroi Wunderlin
- Bauhinia pinnata Blanco
- Bauhinia piresii Vaz & G.P.Lewis
- Bauhinia platypetala Burch. ex Benth.
- Bauhinia platyphylla Benth.
- Bauhinia podopetala Baker
- Bauhinia pottsii G.Don
- Bauhinia prainiana Craib
- Bauhinia pringlei S.Watson
- Bauhinia proboscidea P.Juárez, Rod.Flores & M.A.Blanco
- Bauhinia pulchella Benth.
- Bauhinia purpurea L.
- Bauhinia racemosa Lam.
- Bauhinia ramirezii Reynoso
- Bauhinia ramosissima Benth. ex Hemsl.
- Bauhinia retifolia Standl.
- Bauhinia richardiana DC.
- Bauhinia rubeleruziana Donn.Sm.
- Bauhinia rufa (Bong.) Steud.
- Bauhinia rufescens Lam.
- Bauhinia saccocalyx Pierre
- Bauhinia saksuwaniae Mattapha, Chantar. & Suddee
- Bauhinia seleriana Harms
- Bauhinia seminarioi Harms ex Eggers
- Bauhinia smilacifolia Burch. ex Benth.
- Bauhinia stenantha Diels
- Bauhinia subclavata Benth.
- Bauhinia subrotundifolia Cav.
- Bauhinia taitensis Taub.
- Bauhinia tarapotensis Benth.
- Bauhinia tenella Benth.
- Bauhinia thailandica Chatan & Promprom
- Bauhinia thompsonii I.M.Johnst.
- Bauhinia tomentosa L.
- Bauhinia tuichiensis Cayola & A.Fuentes
- Bauhinia uberlandiana Vaz & G.P.Lewis
- Bauhinia ungulata L.
- Bauhinia urbaniana Schinz
- Bauhinia uruguayensis Benth.
- Bauhinia variegata L.
- Bauhinia vespertilio S.Moore
- Bauhinia viridescens Desv.
- Bauhinia weberbaueri Harms
- Bauhinia wunderlinii R.Torres
- Bauhinia xerophyta Du Puy & R.Rabev.

=== Hybrids ===
One hybrid is known, Bauhinia × blakeana S. T. Dunn (Bauhinia variegata × Bauhinia purpurea)—Hong Kong orchid tree.

=== Fossils ===
The oldest known species is B. tibetensis, known from fossil leaves from the Late Paleocene of the Tibetan Plateau, where it inhabited the Kohistan-Ladakh Arc, an island arc that existed in the region at the time. It has been suggested that the Asian clade of Bauhinia originated as early as the Early Paleocene, when it dispersed from the genus's region of origin in Africa.

Several fossils of Bauhinia species have been discovered:

- †Bauhinia cheniae Qi Wang, Z. Q. Song, Y. F. Chen, S. Shen & Z. Y. Li
- †Bauhinia cretacea Newberry
- †Bauhinia fotana F.M.B. Jacques et al.
- †Bauhinia gigantea Newberry
- †Bauhinia gracilis J.R. Tao
- †Bauhinia larsenii D.X. Zhang & Y. F. Chen
- †Bauhinia ningmingensis Qi Wang, Z. Q. Song, Y. F. Chen, S. Shen & Z. Y. Li
- †Bauhinia potosiana Berry
- †Bauhinia tibetensis Y. Gao et T. Su
- †Bauhinia thonningii Schum.
- †Bauhinia ungulatoides Y.X.Lin, W.O.Wong, G.L.Shi, S.Shen & Z.Y.Li
- †Bauhinia wenshanensis H.H. Meng & Z.K. Zhou
- †Bauhinia wyomingiana Brown

=== Segregated genera ===
Species in the genera Barklya, Gigasiphon, Lysiphyllum, Phanera (including Lasiobema), Piliostigma, Schnella, and Tylosema are sometimes included in Bauhinia sensu lato or considered as tribe Bauhinieae.
