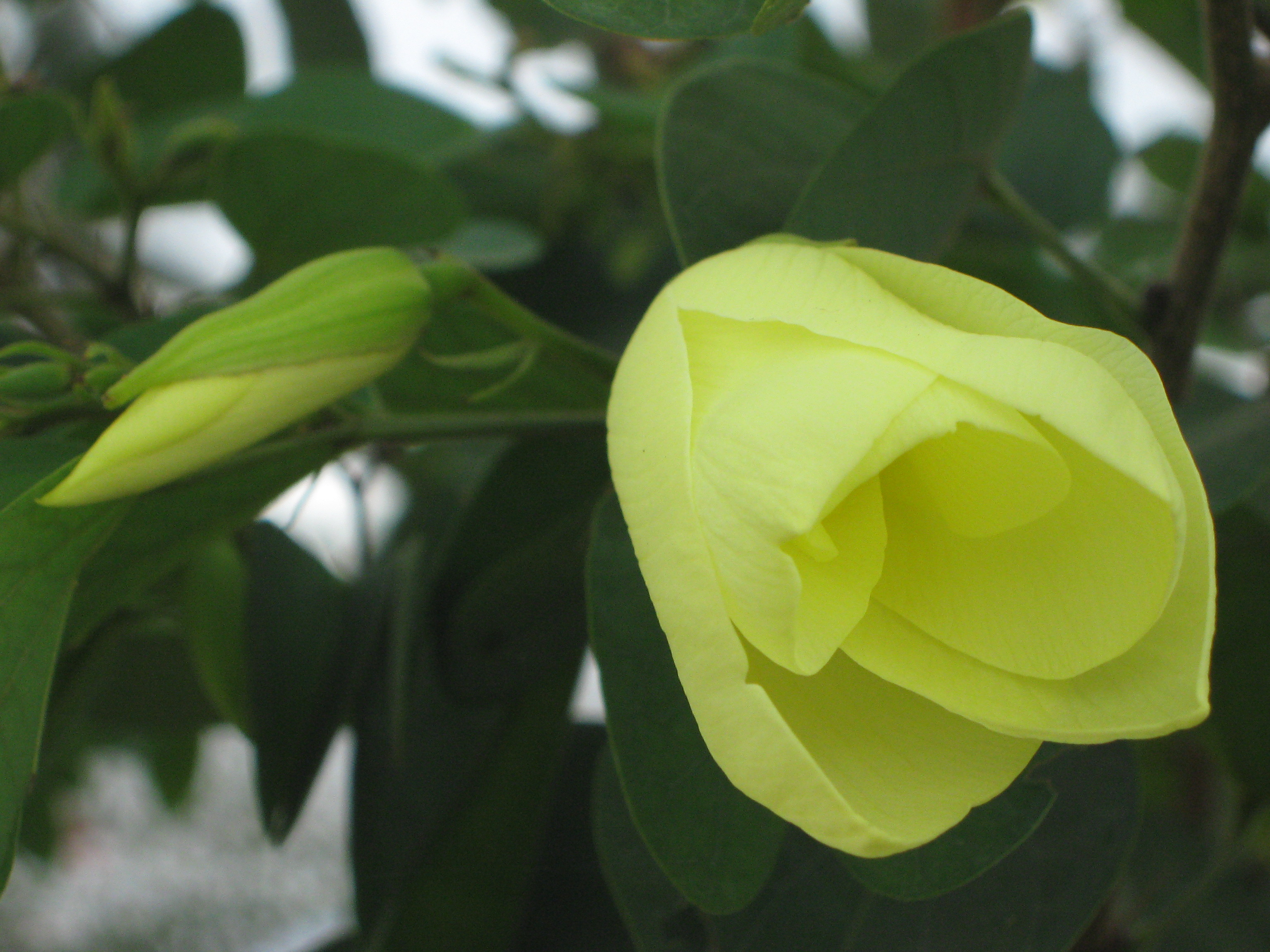
- Flowers of yellow bauhinia

Scientific classification
- Kingdom: Plantae
- Clade: Tracheophytes
- Clade: Angiosperms
- Clade: Eudicots
- Clade: Rosids
- Order: Fabales
- Family: Fabaceae
- Genus: Bauhinia
- Species: B. tomentosa

Binomial name
- Bauhinia tomentosa L.

Synonyms
- Alvesia bauhinioides Welw.; Alvesia tomentosa (L.) Britton & Rose; Bauhinia pubescens DC.; Bauhinia tomentosa var. glabrata Hook. f.; Bauhinia volkensii Taub.; Bauhinia wituensis Harms; Pauletia tomentosa (L.) A.Schmitz

= Bauhinia tomentosa =

Species of legume

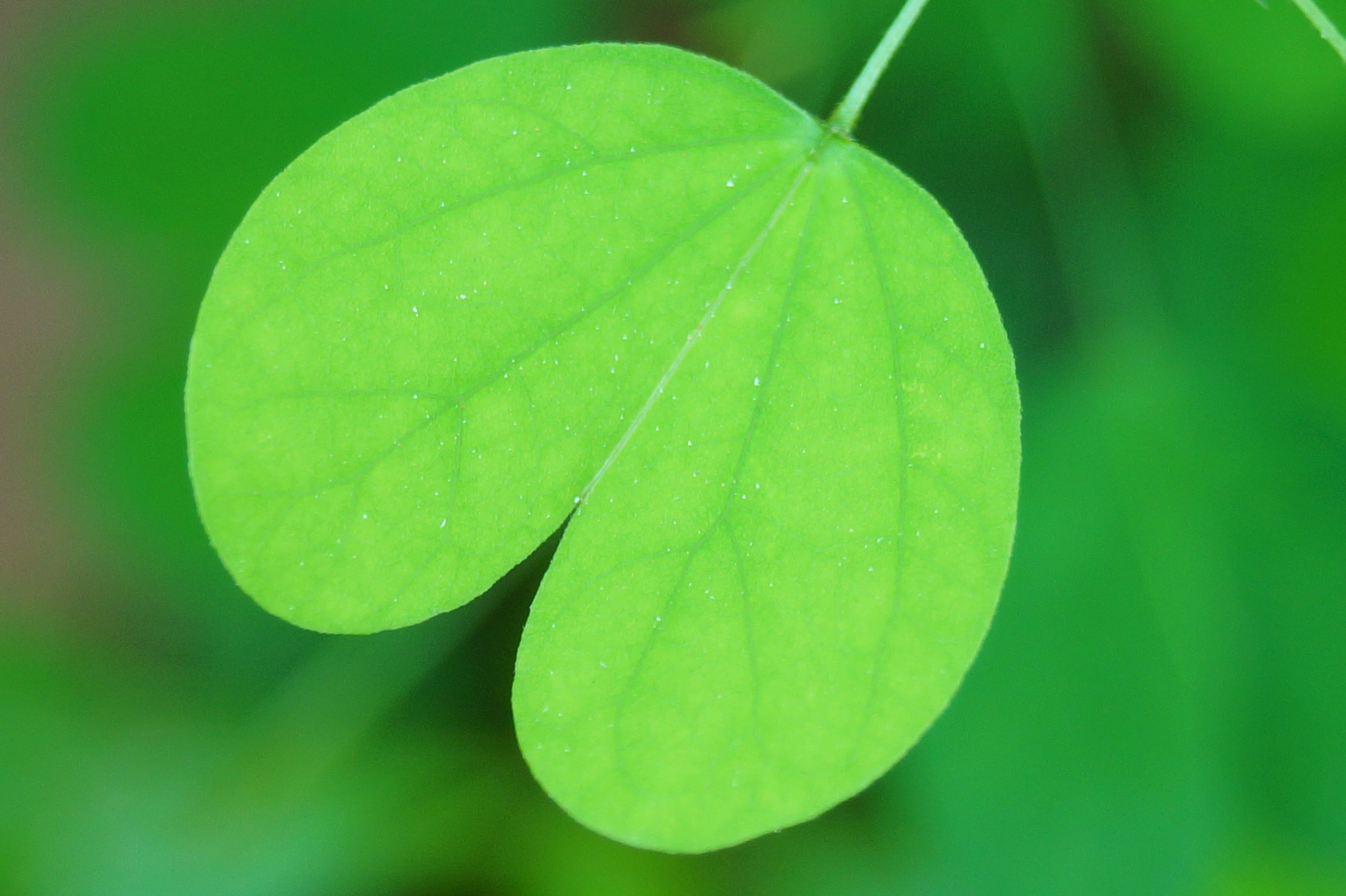
yellow bell orchid tree leaves

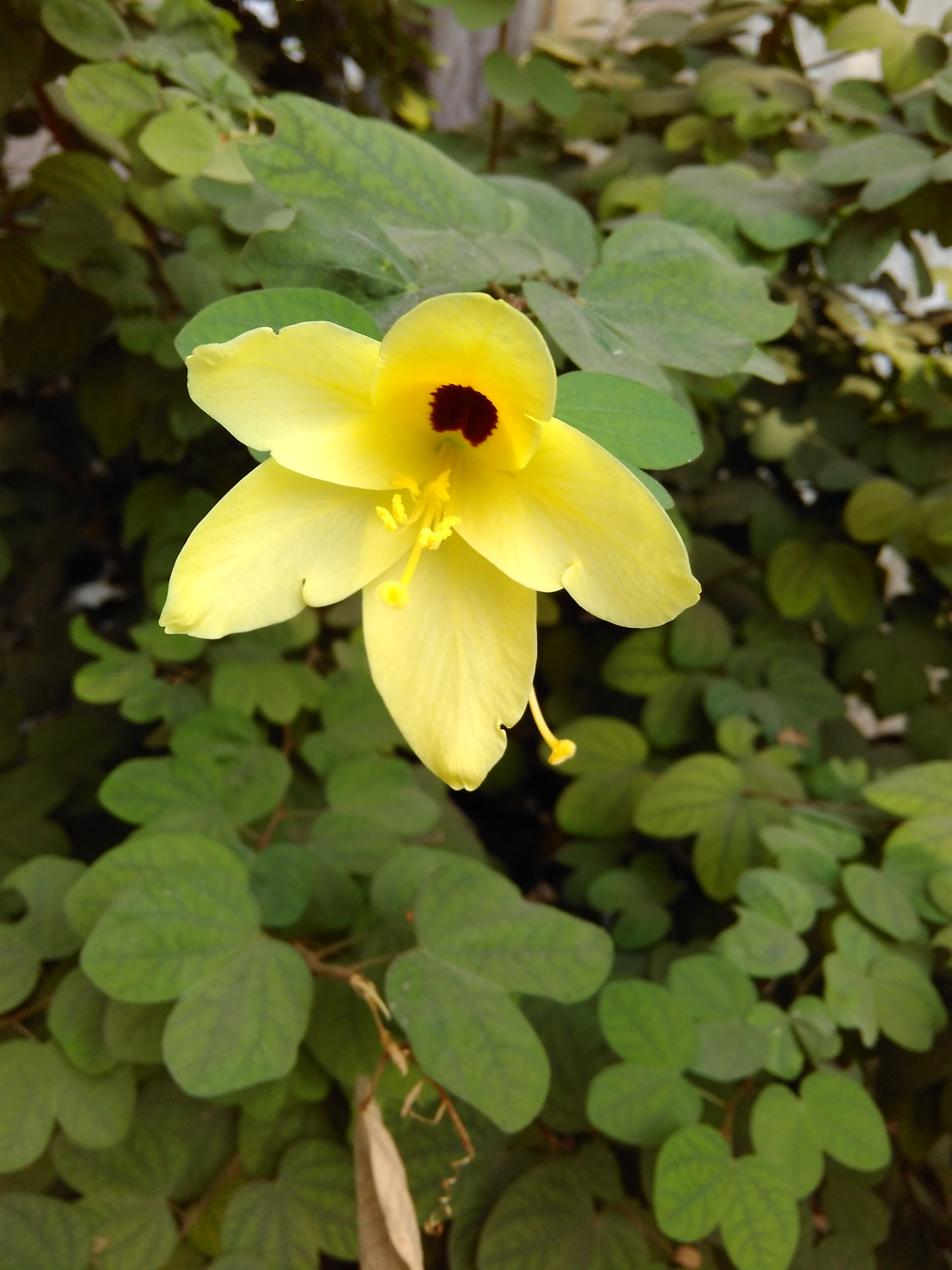
Yellow bauhinia

Bauhinia tomentosa, also known as yellow bauhinia or yellow bell orchid tree, is a species of plant in the family Fabaceae. It is found in South Africa, Mozambique, Zimbabwe, Tropical Africa, India, and Sri Lanka.

== Description ==
Yellow bauhinia is a small tree with a maximum height of 4 m (13 ft). It has drooping slender branches with multiple scrambling stems. The bark is greyish, smooth, and sometimes hairy, which gives its specific name tomentosa. Greenish leaves are deeply divided and elliptic in nature; margin entire. Flowers are bell-shaped with large, yellow petals with a dark maroon patch at the base. The fruit is a pale-brown pod. Extracts of the plant's roots have in vitro antimicrobial activity against Gram-positive bacteria.
