= Liana =

Type of woody vine

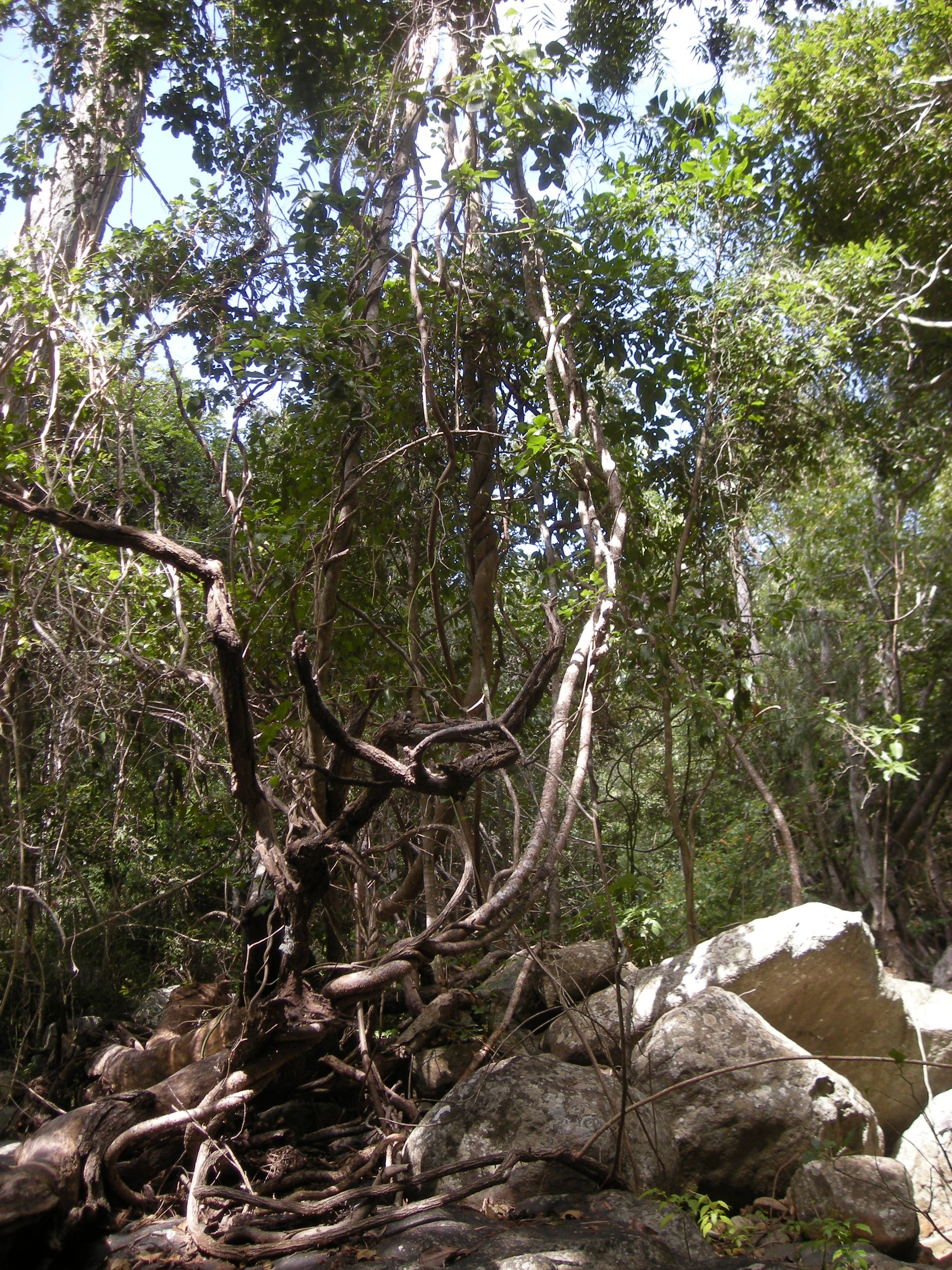
Mixed-species tangle of lianas in tropical Australia

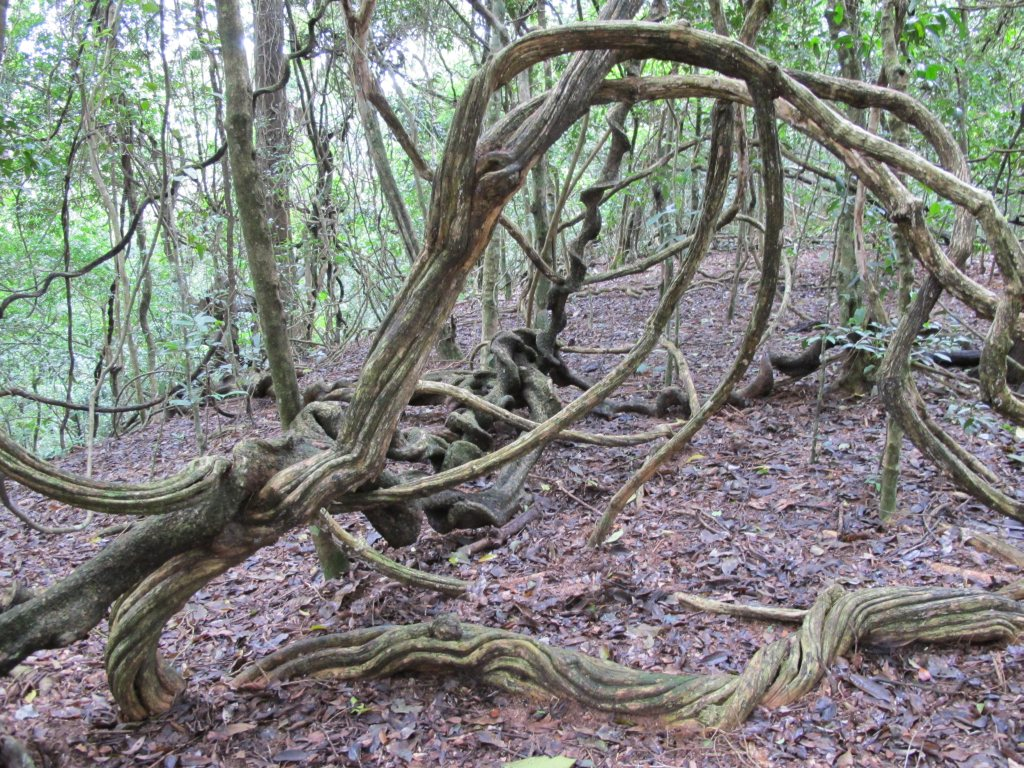
Lianas in Udawattakele, Sri Lanka

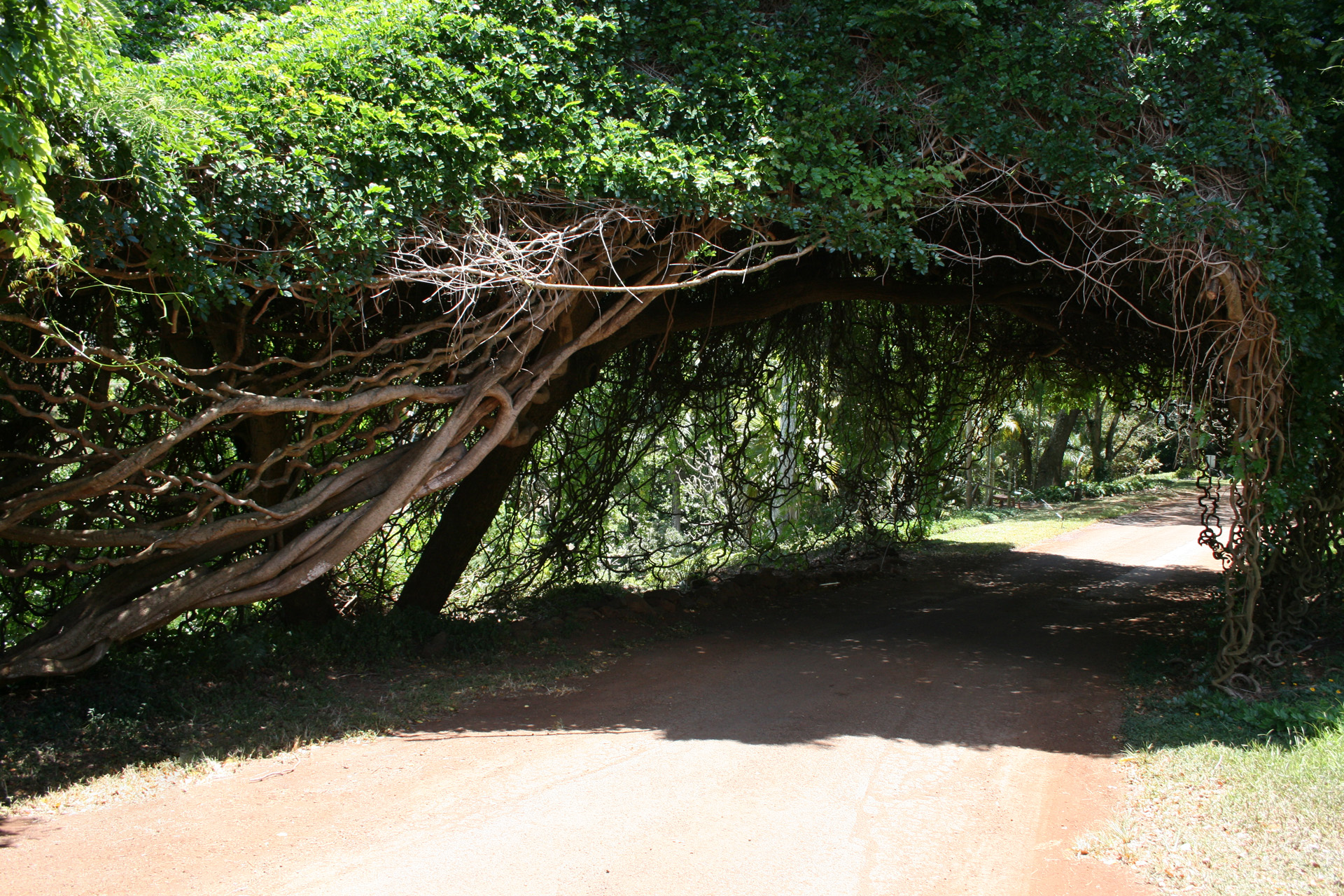
A canopy of Entada gigas that has formed over a monkey ladder vine (Bauhinia glabra) on Kauai, Hawaii

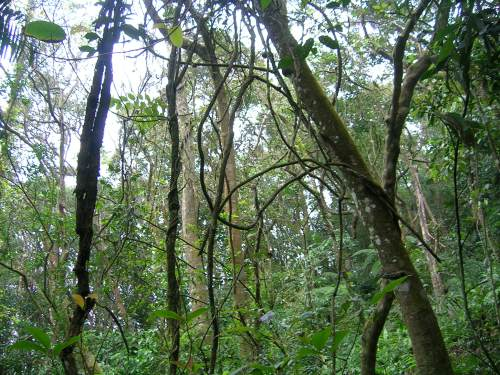
Liana tangle across a forest in the Western Ghats

A liana (/liˈænə/ lee-ANN-ə, also /-ɑːnə/ -AH-nə) is a long-stemmed woody vine that is rooted in the soil at ground level and uses trees, as well as other means of vertical support, to climb up to the canopy in search of direct sunlight. The word liana does not refer to a taxonomic grouping, but rather a habit of plant growth—much like tree or shrub. It comes from standard French liane, itself from an Antilles French dialect word meaning 'to sheave'.

== Ecology ==
Lianas are characteristic of tropical moist broadleaf forests (especially seasonal forests), but may be found in temperate rainforests and temperate deciduous forests. There are also temperate lianas, for example the members of the Clematis or Vitis (wild grape) genera. Lianas can form bridges in the forest canopy, providing arboreal animals—including ants and many other invertebrates, lizards, rodents, sloths, monkeys, and lemurs—with paths through the forest. For example, in the Eastern tropical forests of Madagascar many lemurs achieve higher mobility from the web of lianas draped among the vertical tree species. Many lemurs prefer trees with lianas because of their roots.

Lianas are parasitic; they do not derive nutrients directly from host trees, but live on and indirectly derive nutrients at their expense. Specifically, their growth may greatly reduce their hosts' growth and tree reproduction, greatly increase tree mortality, prevent tree seedlings from establishing, alter the course of regeneration in forests, and ultimately decrease tree population growth rates. For example, forests without lianas grow 150% more fruit, and trees with lianas have twice the probability of dying.

Lianas are uniquely adapted to living in forests as they use host trees, for stability, to reach to top of the canopy. Lianas directly damage their hosts by mechanical abrasion and strangulation, render hosts more susceptible to ice and wind damage, and increase the probability that the host tree falls. Lianas also provide support for weaker trees when strong winds blow by laterally anchoring them to stronger trees. However, this anchoring can also be destructive because when one tree falls, the connections made by the lianas can cause many other trees to fall. Because of these negative effects, trees that remain free of lianas are at an advantage; some species have evolved characteristics which help them avoid or shed lianas.

Some lianas attain great length, such as Bauhinia sp. in Surinam which has grown as long as 600 m (2,000 ft). Hawkins has accepted a length of 1.5 km (1 mile) for an Entada phaseoloides. The longest monocot liana is Calamus manan (or Calamus ornatus) at 240 m (787 ft). One way of distinguishing lianas from trees and shrubs is their stiffness, specifically, the Young's modulus of various parts of the stem. Trees and shrubs have young twigs and smaller branches that are quite flexible and older growth such as trunks and large branches that are stiffer. A liana often has stiff young growths and older, more flexible growth at the base of the stem. Because of these stresses, some lianas grow flat ribbon-like stems which are very flexible, including certain Bauhinia species, Entada species, some Tetrastigma species, as well as Serjania icthyoctonia and Thinonia scandens, both in the Sapindaceae. These last two go still further and the ribbon divides into parallel strands.

== Examples ==
Some examples of taxa with lianas include:

- Acanthaceae
  - Mendoncia
  - Thunbergia, such as T. grandiflora and T. mysorensis
- Anacardiaceae
  - Attilaea
  - Rhus
  - Toxicodendron
- Ancistrocladaceae
  - Ancistrocladus
- Annonaceae
  - Artabotrys
  - Fissistigma
  - Uvaria
- Apocynaceae
  - Fockea, e.g. F. multiflora
  - Odontadenia
  - Stephanotis
  - Strophanthus, e.g. S. sarmentosus
  - Trachelospermum, e.g., T. jasminoides
- Arecaceae
  - Calamus (synonyms including Daemonorops)
- Araceae
  - Pothos, e.g. P. lancifolius
- Aristolochiaceae
  - Aristolochia
- Bignoniaceae
  - Anemopaegma
  - Pyrostegia
- Capparaceae
  - Capparis
- Celastraceae
  - Celastrus
- Connaraceae
  - Connarus
- Dilleniaceae
  - Doliocarpus
- Dioscoreaceae
  - Dioscorea, e.g. D. sylvatica
- Fabaceae
  - some Acacia, e.g. A. concinna
  - Callerya megasperma
  - Cheniella (Asia)
  - Dalbergia armata
  - Derris
  - Entada
  - Hultholia mimosoides
  - Machaerium
  - Mezoneuron
  - Mucuna, e.g. M. bennettii
  - Pterolobium
  - Pueraria, e.g. P. montana, or kudzu
  - Phanera (Asia to Australia)
  - Schnella (tropical Americas)
  - Strongylodon, e.g. S. macrobotrys
  - Wisteria
- Flagellariaceae
  - Flagellaria indica
- Gnetophyta
  - Gnetum
- Loganiaceae
  - Strychnos, e.g. S. axillaris
- Nepenthaceae
  - Nepenthes
- Nyctaginaceae
  - Bougainvillea
- Oleaceae
  - Jasminum
- Polygalaceae
  - Moutabea, e.g. M. aculeata
- Rosaceae
  - Rosa banksiae
- Sapindaceae
  - Paullinia
- Rhamnaceae
  - Ventilago
  - Ziziphus
- Rubiaceae
  - Uncaria
- Rutaceae
  - Toddalia asiatica
- Schlegeliaceae
  - Schlegelia
- Smilacaceae
  - Smilax
- Verbenaceae
  - Petrea, e.g. P. volubilis
- Vitaceae
  - Ampelopsis
  - Cissus, e.g. C. hypoglauca
  - Parthenocissus
  - Tetrastigma
  - Vitis
