= Purple jade vine =

Purple jade vine can refer to:

- Strongylodon juangonzalezii, a species of vine endemic to the Philippines
- Mucuna cyclocarpa, a species of vine in the genus Mucuna, endemic to southeastern China
