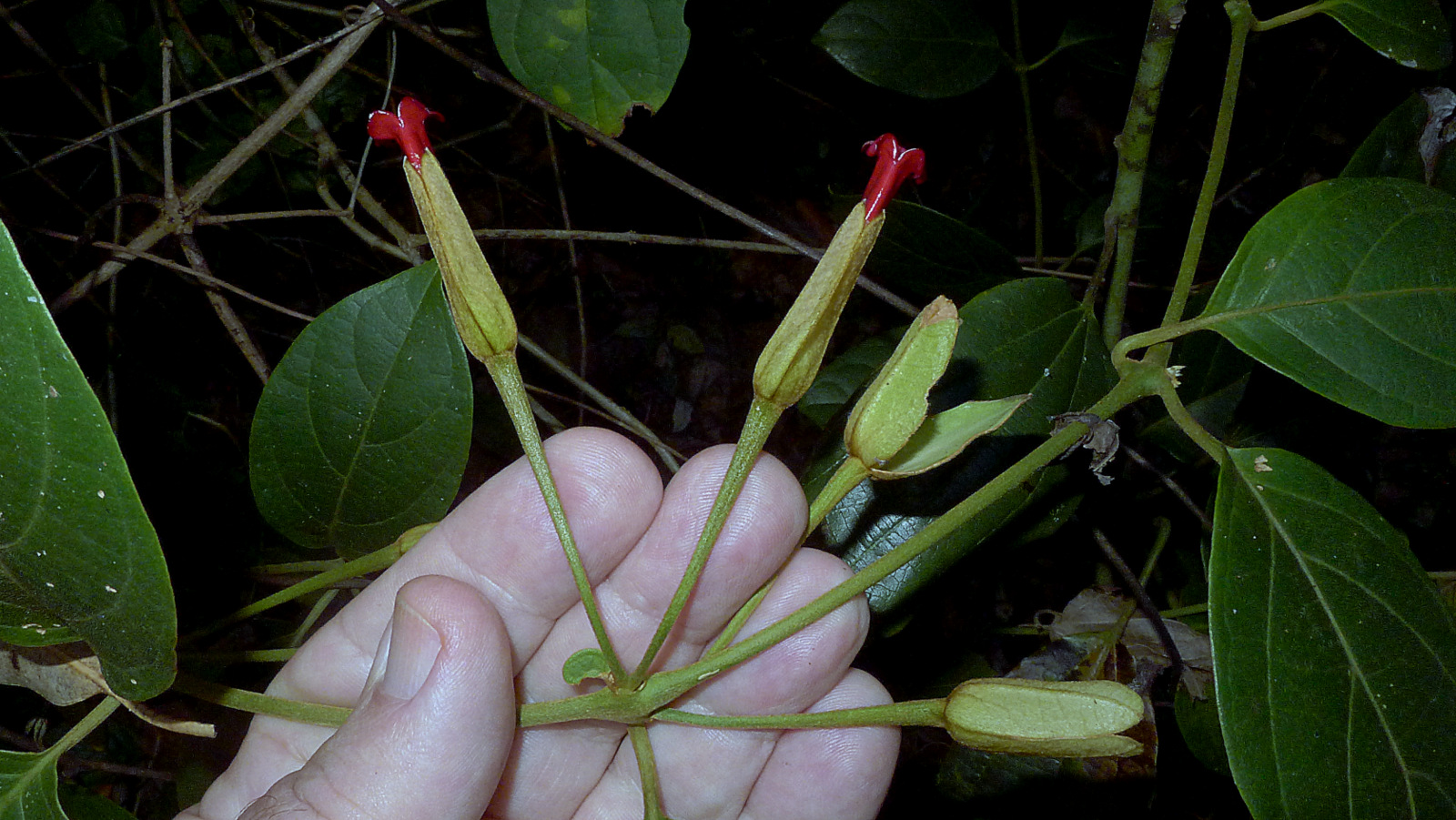

Scientific classification
- Kingdom: Plantae
- Clade: Tracheophytes
- Clade: Angiosperms
- Clade: Eudicots
- Clade: Asterids
- Order: Lamiales
- Family: Acanthaceae
- Genus: Mendoncia
- Species: M. velloziana

Binomial name
- Mendoncia velloziana Mart. (1829)

Synonyms
- Mendoncia fulva Lindau (1897); Mendoncia velloziana var. sphingeria Mart. (1829)

= Mendoncia velloziana =

Species of flowering plant

Mendoncia velloziana is a species of flowering plant in the family Acanthaceae. It is a liana native to tropical South America, ranging from Colombia and Peru through northern, eastern, and southern Brazil to Paraguay.

native to Atlantic Coast restingas vegetation which is an ecosystem of Atlantic Forest biome. In addition, this plant grows either in Cerrado vegetation of Brazil. This plant grows in following states of Brazil: Bahia, Ceará Minas Gerais Rio de Janeiro, São Paulo, Paraná and Santa Catarina, and it is usually visited by the hummingbirds.
