= Masungi Georeserve =

Nature reserve in Rizal province, Philippines

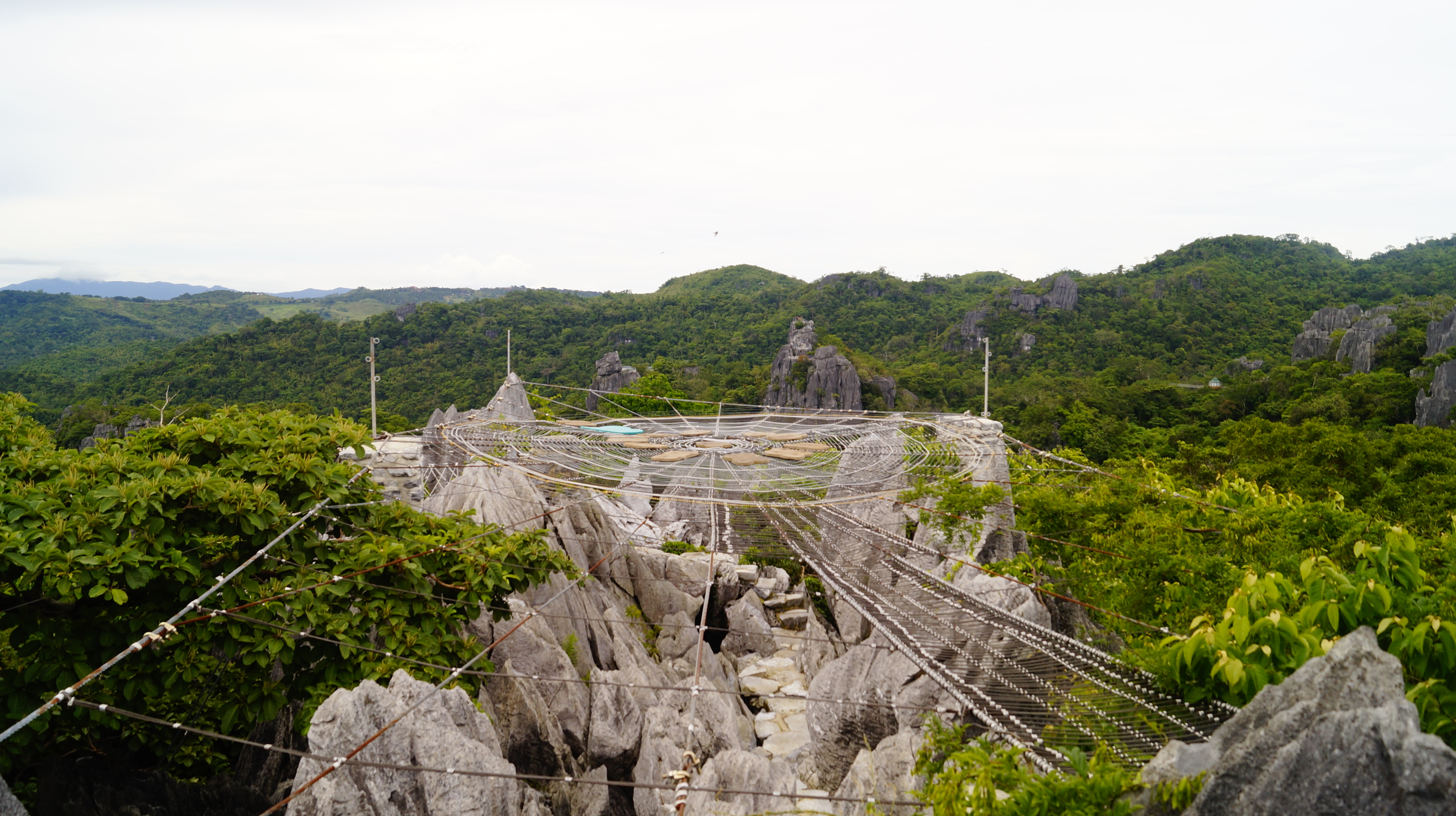
- The Sapot web-style view platform at the Masungi Georeserve
- Interactive map of Masungi Georeserve
- Location: Baras, Rizal, Philippines
- Coordinates: 14°36′18″N 121°20′19″E
- Area: 2,700 hectares (27 km^{2})
- Elevation: 2,100 ft (640 m)
- Established: 1996
- Operator: Masungi Georeserve Foundation
- Website: Masungi Georeserve

The Masungi Georeserve is a conservation area in the Philippines that sits atop a limestone karst formation within the southern portion of the Sierra Madre range in Baras, Rizal. It centers on the geological formations of Masungi Rock at an elevation of 640 metres (2,100 ft). In 1993, the Masungi Rock and its vicinity were proposed to be declared as a "strict nature reserve" and a "wildlife sanctuary". It has been a popular destination for hikes and day trips from Metro Manila and started development towards geopark status.

== History ==
The park was a component of the Mariquina Watershed Reservation from its creation on July 26, 1904, to October 29, 1973. In 1993, Masungi Rock and its vicinity were proposed to be declared as a "strict nature reserve" and a "wildlife sanctuary" by the Department of Environment and Natural Resources (DENR).

In 1996, a joint venture agreement was established between DENR and Blue Star Development for the development of a conservation and ecotourism project in the area, which would retain 70% green spaces and 30% for development. In 1997, DENR and Blue Star signed another joint venture agreement for a 130-hectare housing project called Garden Cottages. The project was intended to provide housing for government employees, including those from DENR, the Department of Education, the Department of the Interior and Local Government, the Department of National Defense, and other agencies. However, the project was delayed due to conflicts with logging companies operating in the area and quarrying firms interested in its karst limestone formations. As a result, no progress was made from 1996 to 2000. According to Blue Star founder and president Ben Dumaliang, the delays were so prolonged that they ultimately lost the market for the development.

In 2000, the DENR granted Blue Star permission to convert, conserve, and rehabilitate the Masungi area into a conservation park, marking the beginning of a privately-driven environmental protection effort in Masungi. In 2002, the two parties entered into a supplemental agreement that expanded the project area by an additional 300 hectares in Lot 10, where the Dumaliang family later developed Masungi Georeserve. In 2008, Blue Star negotiated to exchange the unbuilt 5,000 housing units from the 1997 agreement for 145 housing units in Pueblocillo Village, Dasmariñas, Cavite.

In 2015, Ben Dumaliang's daughters, Ann and Billie Dumaliang, formally established the Masungi Georeserve Foundation, Inc. (MGFI) to expand conservation efforts and promote geotourism as a sustainable funding model.

In 2017, under the leadership of then-DENR Secretary Gina Lopez, MGFI and DENR launched the Masungi Geopark Project, an initiative to restore 2,700 hectares of degraded watershed areas surrounding the Masungi Georeserve. This was considered one of the largest collaborative reforestation efforts in the Philippines.

In May 2022, the DENR ordered the suspension of mineral production sharing agreements with three mining firms operating in the Masungi Georeserve. The DENR's Mines and Geosciences Bureau also announced plans to investigate whether illegal quarrying activities were still occurring despite the suspensions. However, MGFI rejected the suspensions and instead called for the complete cancellation of the mining agreements, arguing that suspension alone does not prevent future quarrying. The foundation also cited past statements from Rapid City Realty and Quarry Rock Group, two of the affected firms, in which they expressed their intent to continue advocating for economic revival through quarrying.

In July 2024, the DENR officially announced plans to nullify the 2017 memorandum of understanding with MGFI through then-secretary Gina Lopez following doubts raised on its constitutionality. American actor and environmentalist Leonardo DiCaprio subsequently appealed to President Bongbong Marcos to protect Masungi.

In March 2025, the DENR canceled its 2002 supplemental agreement with Blue Star, citing the company's failure to execute a housing project in Masungi for government officials within five years of signing, lack of public bidding, and the lack of a presidential proclamation to classify the land for housing purposes. The DENR ordered Blue Star to vacate the land within 15 days of receiving the official cancellation notice. MGFI strongly opposed DENR's decision, asserting that the original 1996 agreement remains valid, ensuring Masungi's continued conservation and ecotourism efforts.

=== Controversies and incidents ===
In April 2021, an intentional fire destroyed 16 hectares of forest within Masungi.

In June 2021, a mountainside area of the reserve was illegally logged.

On July 24, 2021, two park rangers were shot while resting at their ranger post. On August 13, the two rangers, who sustained injuries from the shooting, filed at the Rizal prosecutor's office frustrated murder charges against the alleged assailants. The attack was reportedly linked to a land dispute involving GSB Resort, whose owner was among those prosecuted. According to the Masungi Georeserve Foundation, the resort was being illegally expanded within a portion of the Upper Marikina River Basin Protected Landscape, which includes the Masungi Georeserve. The Department of Environment and Natural Resources (DENR) had previously issued multiple cease-and-desist and show-cause orders against various businesses in the protected landscape, including GSB Resort, due to its unauthorized presence in the conservation area. However, the foundation claims authorities had failed to enforce the cease-and-desist orders effectively. Following the attack, the DENR regional office sought reinforcement from the Philippine Army and the Special Action Force to strengthen protection efforts in the area.

On September 3, 2022, approximately 20 armed men representing Sinagtala Security Services Inc. arrived at kilometer 48 of the Marikina–Infanta Highway and established a camp within the Masungi Georeserve. They asserted operational rights allegedly granted by the DENR in the early 2000s. However, they failed to provide documentation to substantiate their claims. The Masungi Foundation condemned the occupation, arguing that the presence of armed personnel on protected land, as well as reported harassment of park staff, constituted violations of Philippine law. On September 20, the foundation issued a public appeal calling for the arrest and prosecution of the invaders, assistance from the DENR, and an investigation into possible police involvement in the incident. In response, the DENR and the Philippine National Police (PNP) launched a joint investigation into both Sinagtala Security Services and the police officers present at the site. An inspection conducted on September 22 revealed that Sinagtala's firearms license had expired on January 30, 2022. The security firm was fined ₱1,000 per violation under the Private Security Agency Law, but authorities stated that "no crime was committed." By September 23, Sinagtala's personnel vacated the premises, and the PNP, alongside Interior Secretary Benhur Abalos, ordered increased patrols in the area. The House of Representatives also filed a resolution calling for a legislative probe into the incident. On September 26, DENR Undersecretary Jonas Leones responded by seeking a review of Masungi's financial records and contracts, a move that the foundation criticized for failing to address the security threats.

The Masungi Georeserve Foundation has been involved in a land dispute with the Bureau of Corrections (BuCor) over a 270-hectare property in Tanay, Rizal, which the foundation asserts is part of a protected area. The foundation initially claimed that BuCor's inspection of the site was related to a proposed relocation site for the New Bilibid Prison (NBP). On February 17, 2023, BuCor Officer-in-Charge Gregorio Catapang Jr. refuted these claims, clarifying that the land was intended for BuCor's new headquarters, residential facilities for personnel, and a detachment facility for forest rangers—not as a relocation site for NBP. Catapang confirmed that BuCor possessed a Transfer Certificate of Title issued in September 2006 under Presidential Proclamation No. 1158, which he stated legally awarded the land to the agency. He further clarified that plans for the new headquarters were still under review, and BuCor would coordinate with the DENR to conduct a delineation survey to establish the boundaries of its property. Catapang assured that any development by BuCor would not harm the environment. In March 2023, the Department of the Interior and Local Government reiterated that Masungi Georeserve is a protected forest reserve.

In late 2023, the Masungi Georeserve Foundation discovered through drone surveillance that Rizal Wind Energy Corp. (RWEC) was conducting construction and drilling activities in Masungi as part of a wind farm project. RWEC, a subsidiary of Singapore-based Vena Energy, planned to build 12 wind turbines within the conservation zone. On February 12, 2024, the foundation publicly condemned the wind farm project, citing environmental risks, its violation of a 1993 administrative order from the DENR prohibiting industrial and commercial activities in Masungi, and the Upper Marikina River Basin's designation as a protected landscape since 2011.

RWEC and Vena Energy asserted that they had secured the necessary government permits to pursue the project, including an environmental compliance certificate. However, the foundation claimed it was never formally notified about the project and only discovered it during routine monitoring. Masungi initially attempted private discussions with RWEC to persuade them to relocate the wind farm, but the company insisted it would proceed with the project while implementing mitigation measures. Masungi rejected these assurances, arguing that mitigation was insufficient if the site selection was fundamentally flawed. The foundation, along with 30 non-governmental organizations, called for the revocation of RWEC and Vena Energy's permits in Masungi on scientific and legal grounds. Masungi emphasized that while it supports renewable energy, the transition should not come at the expense of conservation and urged developers to explore alternative sites outside protected areas.

== Description ==
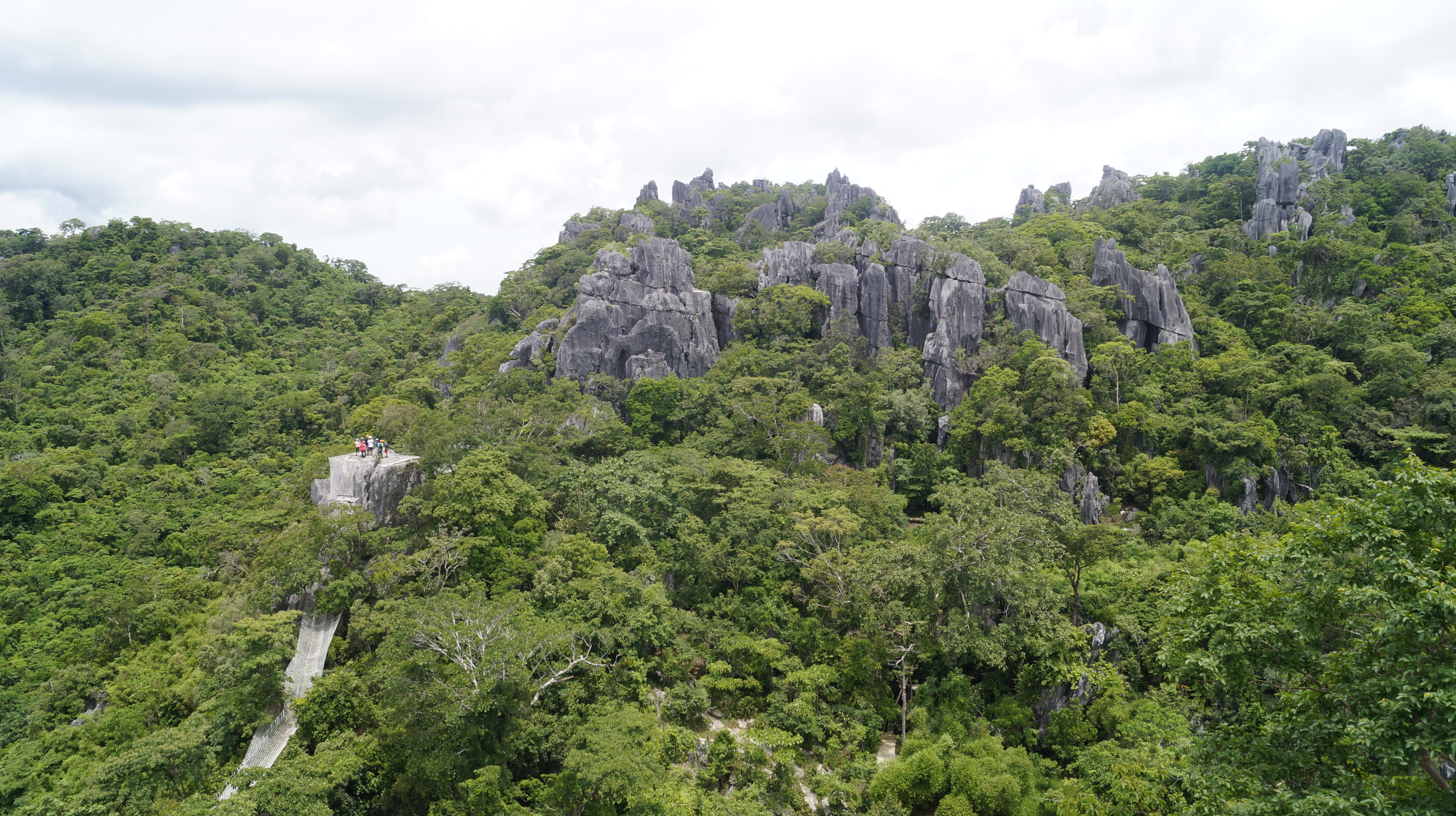
Part of the discovery trail of Masungi Georeserve with karst limestone and rope segments.

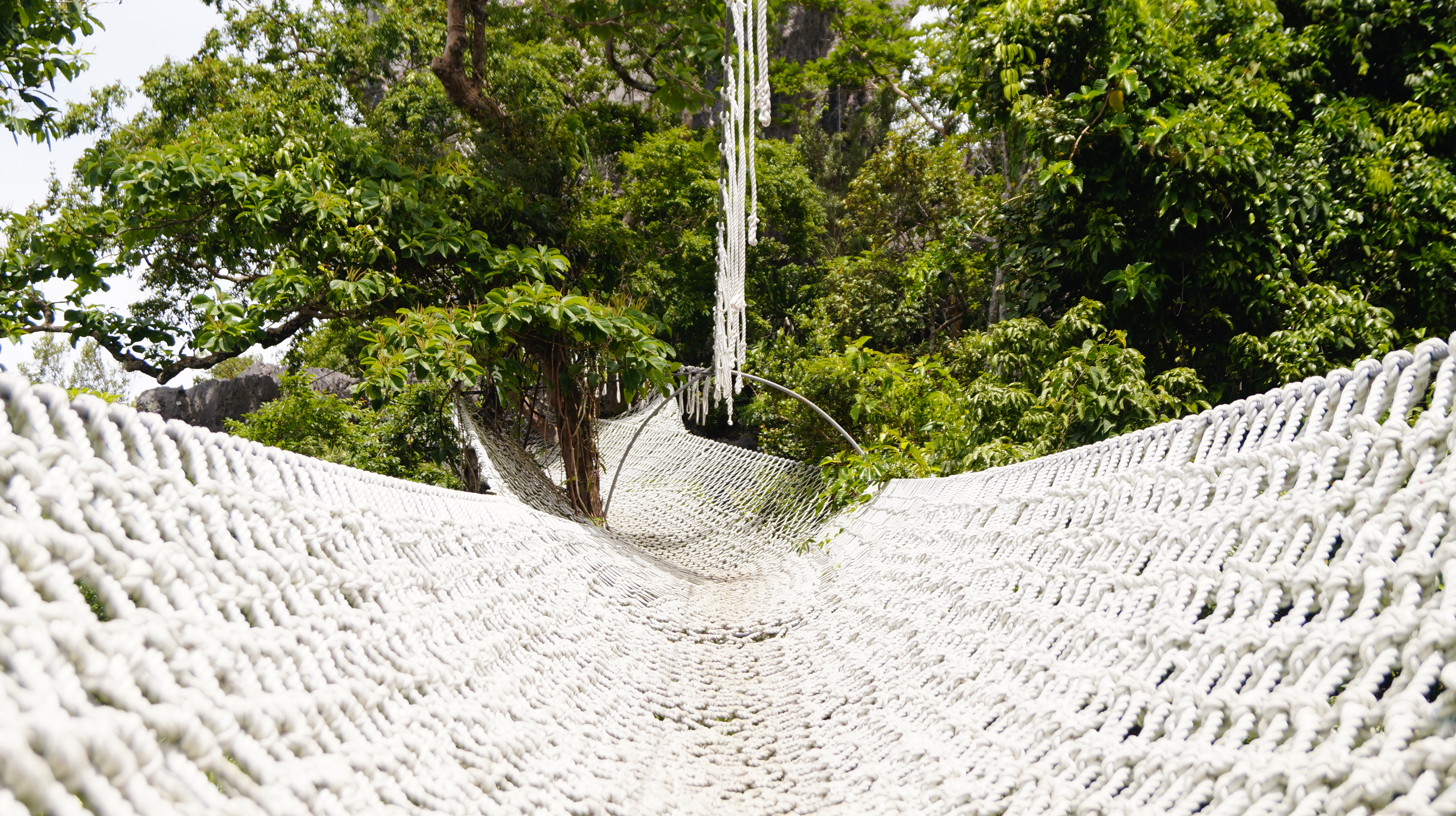
The "Duyan" (giant hammock) at Masungi Georeserve

The Masungi Georeserve is located at Kilometer 47, Marilaque Highway, Baras, Rizal, Philippines. The Masungi Georeserve is characterized by rugged limestone karst peaks, steep slopes, and surrounding lush montane rainforests. It contains several caves, including the Yungíb ni Ruben (Ruben's Cave), which features stalactite and stalagmite formations, as well as a man-made fountain.

A popular attraction in the park is the Sapot ("cobweb"), a metallic platform with wooden steps that allows visitors to walk on suspended netting above the karst and get a 360-degree view of the Sierra Madre and Laguna de Bay. The park's tallest peak, Tatay ("dad"), also has a viewing deck at its summit. The limestone formations are connected by hanging bridges, rope courses, and eco-trails developed by the Masungi Georeserve Foundation, Inc. (MGFI), a non-profit organization founded by civil engineer Ben Dumaliang which manages the park, and Blue Star Development, the park's general contractor which Dumaliang also owns. On one of the hanging bridges, a wooden cable car-like shelter called Paták ("water droplet") can be found that serves as a rest stop for visitors. The Duyan, a giant rope hammock spanning a few hundred feet, is one of Masungi's most photographed rope courses.

=== Biology and ecology ===
Masungi is home to 400 species of flora and fauna including birds, insects, cloud rats, monitor lizards, snakes, monkeys, and civets. Over 100,000 native trees surround the park, predominantly narra trees. Masungi also serves as a habitat for endemic species, including the Northern Luzon giant cloud rat, the Philippine serpent eagle, JC's vine, and salinggogon or Philippine cherry blossoms, which bloom seasonally. Cycas riuminiana, a cycad endemic to Luzon, also grows in Masungi.

In 2017, a new subspecies of microsnail, Hypselostoma latispira masungiensis, was discovered on the limestone boulders of Masungi Georeserve. The park is the only known habitat of the newly discovered subspecies.

=== Trail specifications ===
To sustain conservation efforts, the Masungi Georeserve developed guided eco-tours that showcase the karst landscape, caves, and rich biodiversity while limiting visitor impact. These include the Discovery Trail, which leads visitors to Masungi's limestone formations and conservation areas, and the Legacy Trail, which allows visitors to participate in tree planting and land restoration activities.

Each tour is strictly regulated to minimize environmental damage, with a limited number of guests allowed per visit. An experienced park ranger guides guests throughout the trek, providing in-depth information about the sustainable tourism industry in the Philippines.

It has since been a popular destination for hikes and day trips from Manila since it opened in 2015, starting development towards geopark status.

== Awards and recognitions ==
The Masungi Georeserve and its conservation leaders have received numerous international accolades for their environmental work.

At the 14th ordinary meeting of the Parties to the Convention on Biological Diversity in Egypt, Masungi received the Pathfinder Award for innovation in nature conservation from the International Union for Conservation of Nature, the United Nations Development Programme, and the World Commission on Protected Areas for its "unique" funding model through ecotourism, winning over 200 international nominees.

Masungi Georeserve Foundation, Inc. (MGFI) co-founder and managing trustee Ann Dumaliang was shortlisted as one of 35 regional (Asia-Pacific) finalists for the United Nations Environment Programme's Young Champions of the Earth prize in 2020.

In 2021, the Global Water Partnership acknowledged Masungi's contribution to watershed conservation by awarding the georeserve the Water ChangeMaker Award out of over 350 nominees worldwide. That same year, Vanity Fair magazine awarded Ann and Billie Dumaliang the "Changing Your Mind Travel Award" for their contributions to sustainable tourism through the Masungi Georeserve. The Dumaliang sisters were among the five winners of the award.

In 2022, MGFI co-founder and advocacy director Billie Dumaliang was included in Forbes magazine's 30 Under 30 Asia list under the "social impact" category for her work in Masungi. On September 27, 2022, MGFI won the Sustainable Development Goals Action Award over 3,000 entries from more than 150 countries under the "Inspire" category, recognizing Masungi as a model for sustainable conservation globally.

== See also ==
- Environmental issues in the Philippines
