= Fissistigma verrucosum =

Scientific classification
- Kingdom: Plantae
- Clade: Tracheophytes
- Clade: Angiosperms
- Clade: Magnoliids
- Order: Magnoliales
- Family: Annonaceae
- Genus: Fissistigma
- Species: F. verrucosum

Binomial name
- Fissistigma verrucosum (Hook.f. & Thomson) Merr.

Synonyms
- Melodorum verrucosum Hook.f. & Thomson

Species of flowering plant

Fissistigma verrucosum, the Indian zig-zag vine, also known as hedvekuli, or jyrmi-soh-ram-khlaw is a species of flowering liana in the Annonaceae family. It is endemic to northeast India.
