= Cheniella glauca =

- C. glauca: Hong Kong

Conservation status
- Least Concern (IUCN 3.1)

Scientific classification
- Kingdom: Plantae
- Clade: Tracheophytes
- Clade: Angiosperms
- Clade: Eudicots
- Clade: Rosids
- Order: Fabales
- Family: Fabaceae
- Genus: Cheniella
- Species: C. glauca

Binomial name
- Cheniella glauca (Benth.) R.Clark & Mackinder

Synonyms
- List: Homotypic; Bauhinia glauca (Benth.) Wall. ex Benth. (1861); Phanera glauca Benth. (1852) Heterotypic; Bauhinia micrantha Ridl.; Bauhinia micrantha var. empetrifolia Benth.; Bauhinia micrantha var. puberula Benth.; Phanera corymbosa Benth. nom. illeg. homonym. post.; Phanera ochroleuca Miq.

Species of legumes

Cheniella glauca is a species of scandent plants in the subfamily Cercidoideae and the tribe Bauhinieae. It was first described in 1852 by George Bentham, with its basionym in genus Phanera,, this species also has been placed in genus Bauhinia, before the erection of Cheniella in 2017.

This species is recorded from: Bangladesh to China (Hong Kong), Indochina, and western Malesia. It is a climbing shrub and grows primarily in the wet tropical biome. It may be grown as an ornamental plant.
