= Fissistigma tungfangense =

Conservation status
- Critically Endangered (IUCN 3.1)

Scientific classification
- Kingdom: Plantae
- Clade: Tracheophytes
- Clade: Angiosperms
- Clade: Magnoliids
- Order: Magnoliales
- Family: Annonaceae
- Genus: Fissistigma
- Species: F. tungfangense

Binomial name
- Fissistigma tungfangense Tsiang & P.T.Li

Species of flowering plant

Fissistigma tungfangense is a species of plant in the Annonaceae family. It is endemic to China.
