= Cheniella tenuiflora =

Scientific classification
- Kingdom: Plantae
- Clade: Tracheophytes
- Clade: Angiosperms
- Clade: Eudicots
- Clade: Rosids
- Order: Fabales
- Family: Fabaceae
- Genus: Cheniella
- Species: C. tenuiflora

Binomial name
- Cheniella tenuiflora (G.Watt ex C.B.Clarke) R.Clark & Mackinder
- range

Synonyms
- List: Homotypic; Bauhinia glauca subsp. tenuiflora (G.Watt ex C.B.Clarke) K.Larsen & S.S.Larsen; Bauhinia tenuiflora G.Watt ex C.B.Clarke; Phanera glauca subsp. tenuiflora (G.Watt ex C.B.Clarke) A.Schmitz; Phanera tenuiflora (G.Watt ex C.B.Clarke) de Wit Heterotypic; Bauhinia caterviflora H.Y.Chen; Bauhinia glauca var. caterviflora (H.Y.Chen) K.Larsen & S.S.Larsen ex D.X.Zhang; Bauhinia glauca subsp. caterviflora (H.Y.Chen) T.C.Chen; Bauhinia glauca subsp. hupehana (Craib) T.C.Chen; Bauhinia glauca var. hupehana (Craib) K.Larsen & S.S.Larsen ex D.X.Zhang; Bauhinia glauca subsp. pernervosa (H.Y.Chen) T.C.Chen; Bauhinia glauca var. pernervosa (H.Y.Chen) K.Larsen & S.S.Larsen ex D.X.Zhang; Bauhinia hupehana Craib; Bauhinia hupehana var. grandis Craib; Bauhinia pernervosa H.Y.Chen; Bauhinia polysperma Pierre ex Gagnep.

Species of legumes

Cheniella tenuiflora is a species of scandent shrubs in the subfamily Cercidoideae and the tribe Bauhinieae; first described in 1889 with the basionym in genus Bauhinia,, this species has been placed in genus Phanera, before the erection of Cheniella in 2017.

== Distribution and description ==
The native range of this species is E. Himalaya to Central & S. China, Taiwan and Indochina.

Cheniella tenuiflora is a climbing shrub and grows primarily in subtropical and tropical biomes up to 1500 m. elevation. The leaves are glaucous especially on the undersides; flower petals are white.
