= Mendoncia mollis =

Scientific classification
- Kingdom: Plantae
- Clade: Tracheophytes
- Clade: Angiosperms
- Clade: Eudicots
- Clade: Asterids
- Order: Lamiales
- Family: Acanthaceae
- Genus: Mendoncia
- Species: M. mollis

Binomial name
- Mendoncia mollis Lindau (1898)

Synonyms
- Mendoncia mello-barretoana Steyerm. (1938)

Species of flowering plant

Mendoncia mollis is a plant species in the family Acanthaceae (or according to some specialists in the family Mendonciaceae). It is a liana native to west-central and southeastern Brazil.

It is a climber with opposite, entire ovate leaves somewhat hairy abaxially, which renders the species its epithet. It can be found in nearly every habitat including dense or open forests, in scrublands, on wet fields and valleys, at the sea coast and in marine areas, and in swamps and as an element of mangrove woods.

The fruit is a drupe, resembling a dark grape. The flowers are surrounded by two bracts.

The species' native habitat are the Cerrado of Brazil, specially São Paulo. In addition this plant is in danger of extinction; accordingly, information which is provided to the State Government of São Paulo in the report called Resolução SMA - 48, de 21-09-2004.
