= Fissistigma cupreonitens =

Conservation status
- Endangered (IUCN 3.1)

Scientific classification
- Kingdom: Plantae
- Clade: Embryophytes
- Clade: Tracheophytes
- Clade: Spermatophytes
- Clade: Angiosperms
- Clade: Magnoliids
- Order: Magnoliales
- Family: Annonaceae
- Genus: Fissistigma
- Species: F. cupreonitens

Binomial name
- Fissistigma cupreonitens Merr. & Chun

Species of flowering plant

Fissistigma cupreonitens is a species of plant in the Annonaceae family. It is endemic to southeastern Guangxi in southeastern China.
