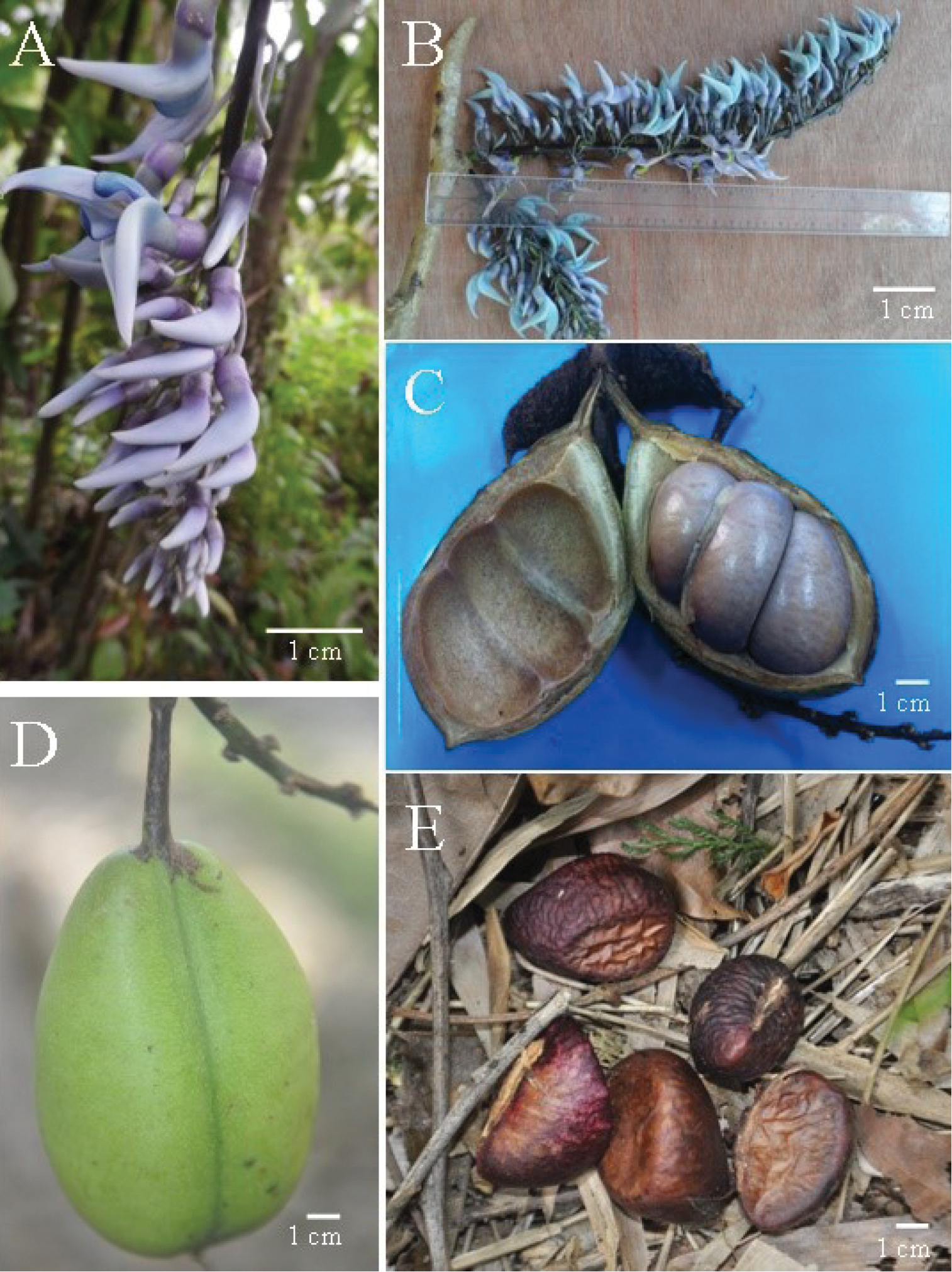
- Strongylodon juangonzalezii A inflorescence; B inflorescence showing point of attachment; C opened pod to show seeds; D & E mature seeds from the wild

Scientific classification
- Kingdom: Plantae
- Clade: Tracheophytes
- Clade: Angiosperms
- Clade: Eudicots
- Clade: Rosids
- Order: Fabales
- Family: Fabaceae
- Subfamily: Faboideae
- Genus: Strongylodon
- Species: S. juangonzalezii

Binomial name
- Strongylodon juangonzalezii Hadsall, Alejado & Cajano
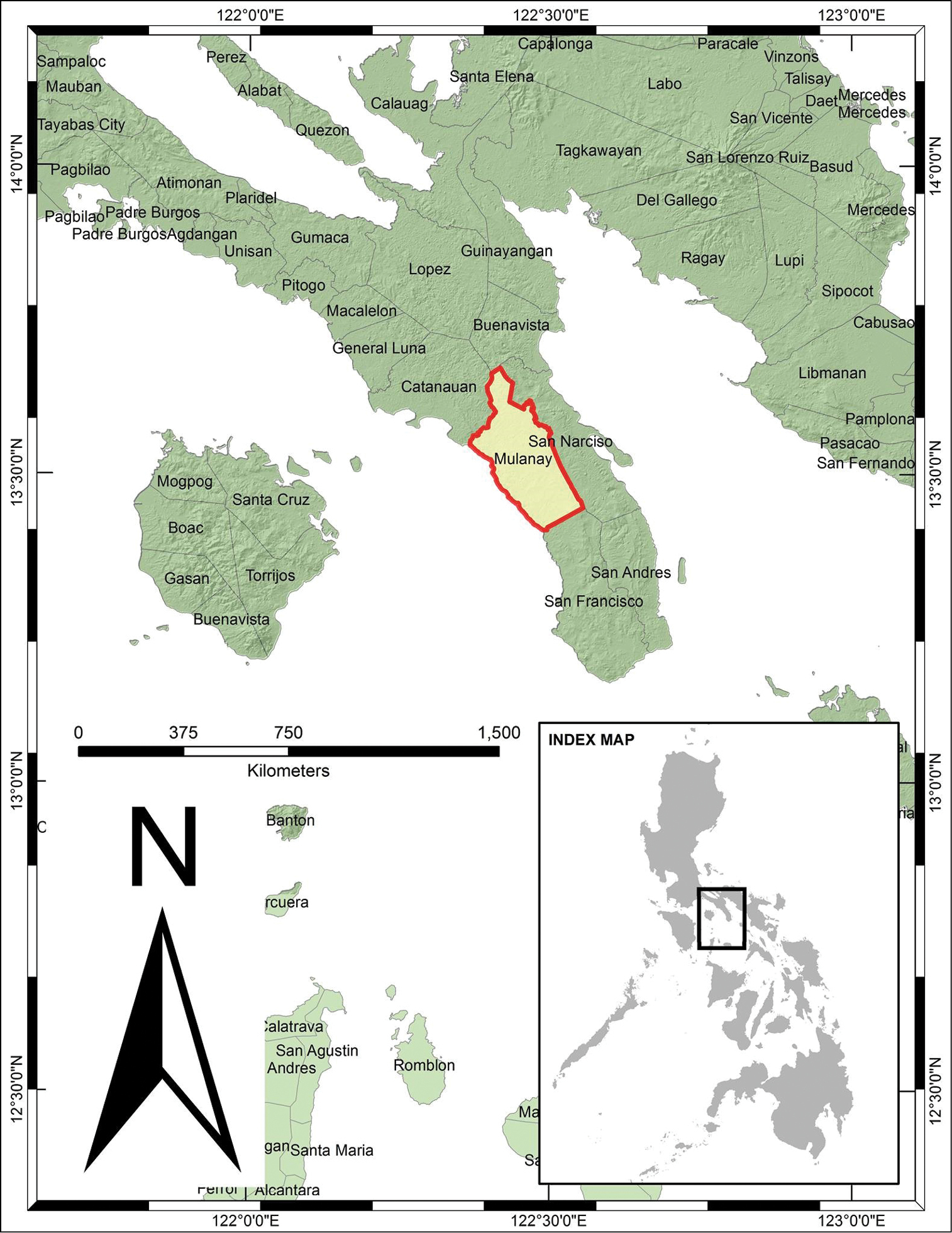
- Site of the Buenavista Protected Landscape, Mulanay, Quezon Province, where the type specimen was collected from

= Strongylodon juangonzalezii =

Flowering vine from the Philippines

Strongylodon juangonzalezii, commonly called dragon's spine or purple jade vine, is a species of leguminous perennial liana (woody vine) endemic to the tropical forests of the Philippines. It bears a cluster of large flowers that are initially lilac to purple in color, but become a striking blue as they mature. In the Philippines, they’re colloquially known as JC’s Vine or Juan Carlos’ Vine.

== Taxonomy ==
Strongylodon juangonzalezii was first described in 2016 from specimens collected from the Buenavista Protected Landscape of Mulanay, Quezon Province. It is named after Juan Carlos Tecson Gonzalez, a professor of zoology and the then director of the UPLB Museum of Natural History. The generic name comes from Greek strongylos ("round") and odontos ("tooth-like"), in reference to the teeth-like shape of the flowers.

== Description ==
Strongylodon juangonzalezii is a large woody vine (liana) that climbs up to forest canopies. Each leaf is borne on long petioles that split into three leaflets with rounded bases and pointed tips, each around 10 cm (3.9 in) long and 6 cm (2.4 in) wide. The leaves are dark green in color on both the upper and lower surfaces.

The flowers of Strongylodon juangonzalezii point upward. They bloom in dense clusters. They are a vibrant lilac to purple color when young, becoming a striking blue color as they mature. The seed pods are oblong in shape. They split longitudinally as they ripen and mature. The seeds are shiny and maroon in color when fresh, but turn dark brown and papery as they dry. Strongylodon juangonzalezii begins to flower and bear fruits from February to mid-March.

== Distribution and habitat ==
Strongylodon juangonzalezii is a liana. It climbs large trees in disturbed secondary growth forests.

Strongylodon juangonzalezii is endemic to the Philippines (it is the eighth endemic species of Strongylodon in the country). It has only been recorded in four sites in Luzon island. Aside from the Buenavista Protected Landscape, it has also been described from the Masungi Georeserve of Rizal.

== See also ==
- Strongylodon macrobotrys, the jade vine, also endemic to the Philippines
