= Mendoncia puberula =

Scientific classification
- Kingdom: Plantae
- Clade: Tracheophytes
- Clade: Angiosperms
- Clade: Eudicots
- Clade: Asterids
- Order: Lamiales
- Family: Acanthaceae
- Genus: Mendoncia
- Species: M. puberula

Binomial name
- Mendoncia puberula Mart. (1829)

Synonyms
- Mendoncia albida Vell. (1829); Mendoncia puberula var. macropus Mart. (1829); Mendoncia puberula var. micropus Mart. (1829); Mendoncia pubescens Poepp. (1840); Mendoncia schwackeana Lindau (1895); Mendoncia sellowiana Nees (1847)

Species of flowering plant

Mendoncia puberula is a species of flowering plant in the family Acanthaceae (or according to some specialists in the family Mendonciaceae). It is a liana native to tropical South America, ranging from Venezuela, Colombia, and Ecuador through northern, central, and southern Brazil.

It is a climber with opposite, entire ovate leaves somewhat hairy abaxially, which renders the species its epithet.

The fruit is a drupe, resembling a dark grape. The flowers are surrounded by two bracts.

The species' native habitat includes the Atlantic Forest and Cerrado in Brazil.
