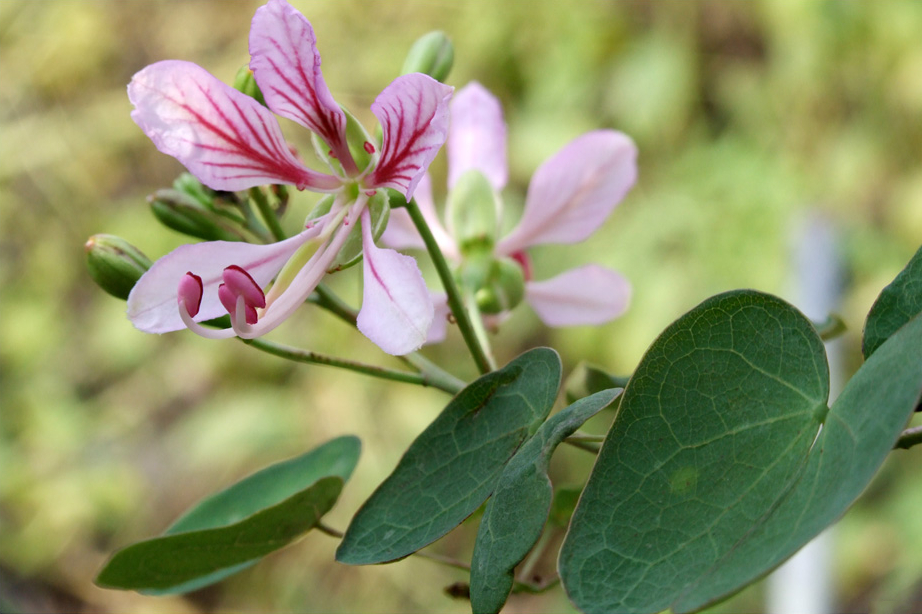
- Cheniella corymbosa

Scientific classification
- Kingdom: Plantae
- Clade: Tracheophytes
- Clade: Angiosperms
- Clade: Eudicots
- Clade: Rosids
- Order: Fabales
- Family: Fabaceae
- Subfamily: Cercidoideae
- Tribe: Bauhinieae
- Genus: Cheniella; R.Clark & Mackinder, 2017

Type species
- Cheniella corymbosa Roxb.

Species
- See text
- The range of Cheniella

Synonyms
- Bauhinia sect. Phanera ser. Corymbosae (de Wit) Wunderlin, K. Larsen & S.S. Larsen 1987; Bauhinia ser. Corymbosae Zhang & T.C.Chen 1992; Phanera subg. Phanera subsect. Corymbosae de Wit 1956

= Cheniella =

Genus of legumes

Cheniella is a genus of flowering plants in the legume family, Fabaceae. It belongs to the subfamily Cercidoideae. The distribution of species ranges from the eastern Himalayas through Indochina and China to Taiwan, Peninsular Malaysia, Sumatra, and Java.

== Description ==
This genus includes species that are often climbers and lianas; their flowers differ from Phanera in having a hypanthium that is equal in length or longer than the sepals, indehiscent fruit, many-seeded fruit, and the funicle extending most of the circumference of the seed.

== Species ==
As of September 2026, Plants of the World Online includes the following accepted species:

1. Cheniella clemensiorum (Merr.) R.Clark & Mackinder
2. Cheniella corymbosa (Roxb. ex DC.) R.Clark & Mackinder
3. Cheniella damiaoshanensis (T.C.Chen) R.Clark & Mackinder
4. Cheniella didyma (H.Y.Chen) R.Clark & Mackinder
5. Cheniella glauca (Benth.) R.Clark & Mackinder
6. Cheniella hechiensis S.R.Gu, T.Y.Tu & D.X.Zhang
7. Cheniella lakhonensis (Gagnep.) R.Clark & Mackinder
8. Cheniella longipes (Hosok.) S.R.Gu, T.Y.Tu & D.X.Zhang
9. Cheniella longistaminea S.R.Gu, T.Y.Tu & D.X.Zhang
10. Cheniella ovatifolia (T.C.Chen) R.Clark & Mackinder
11. Cheniella pubicarpa S.R.Gu, T.Y.Tu & D.X.Zhang
12. Cheniella quinnanensis (T.C.Chen) R.Clark & Mackinder
13. Cheniella tenuiflora (G.Watt ex C.B.Clarke) R.Clark & Mackinder
14. Cheniella tianlinensis (T.C.Chen & D.X.Zhang) S.R.Gu, T.Y.Tu & D.X.Zhang
15. Cheniella touranensis (Gagnep.) R.Clark & Mackinder
16. Cheniella tsoongii X.Peng, K.W.Jiang & T.Y.Tu
