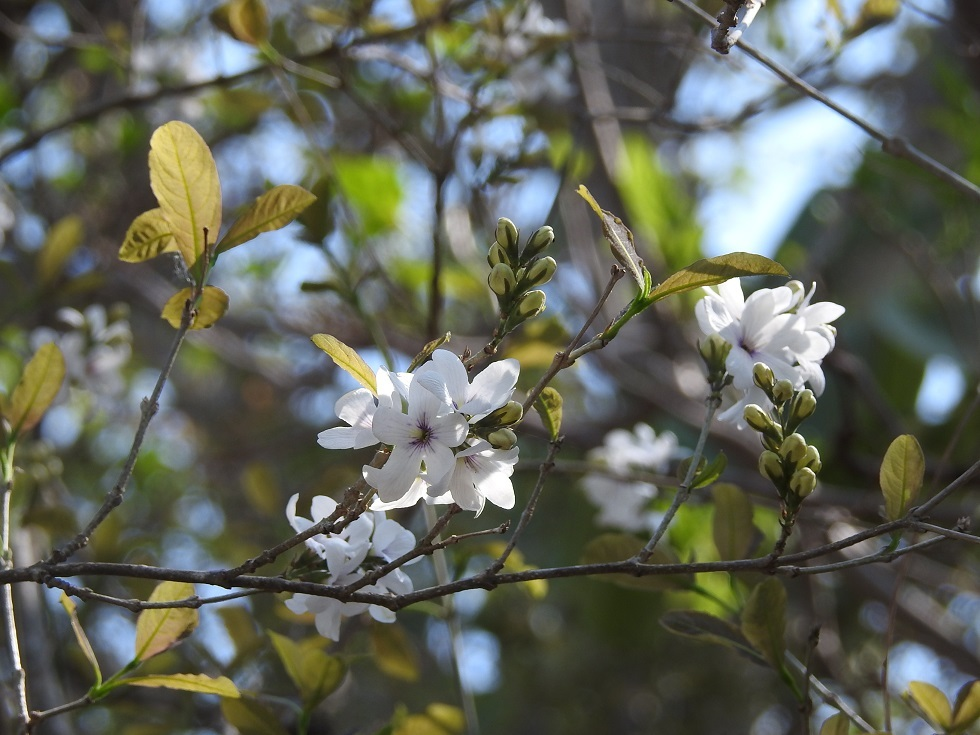

Conservation status
- Vulnerable (IUCN 3.1)

Scientific classification
- Kingdom: Plantae
- Clade: Tracheophytes
- Clade: Angiosperms
- Clade: Eudicots
- Clade: Asterids
- Order: Lamiales
- Family: Verbenaceae
- Genus: Petrea
- Species: P. asperifolia

Binomial name
- Petrea asperifolia (Miranda) Hammel

Synonyms
- Petrea xolocotzia Christenh. & Byng, nom. illeg. superfl.; Xolocotzia asperifolia Miranda

= Petrea asperifolia =

Genus of flowering plants

Petrea asperifolia is a species of flowering plant in the family Verbenaceae. It is a shrub or small tree which grows 2.5 to 4 meters tall. It is native to Chiapas in southern Mexico as well as Honduras and Nicaragua. It has been collected only once in Honduras. It is native to tropical dry deciduous forest from 400 to 1000 meters elevation, including secondary vegetation in disturbed areas.

The species was first described as Xolocotzia asperifolia by Faustino Miranda in 1965, who placed it in the monotypic genus Xolocotzia. Phylogenetic studies concluded that the species is grouped with the genus Petrea in a small clade which is a sister group to the rest of the family. Plants of both genera have fleshy fruits and showy sepals that are longer than the flower corollas at the center. In 2020 Barry Edward Hammel placed the species in genus Petrea as P. asperifolia.
