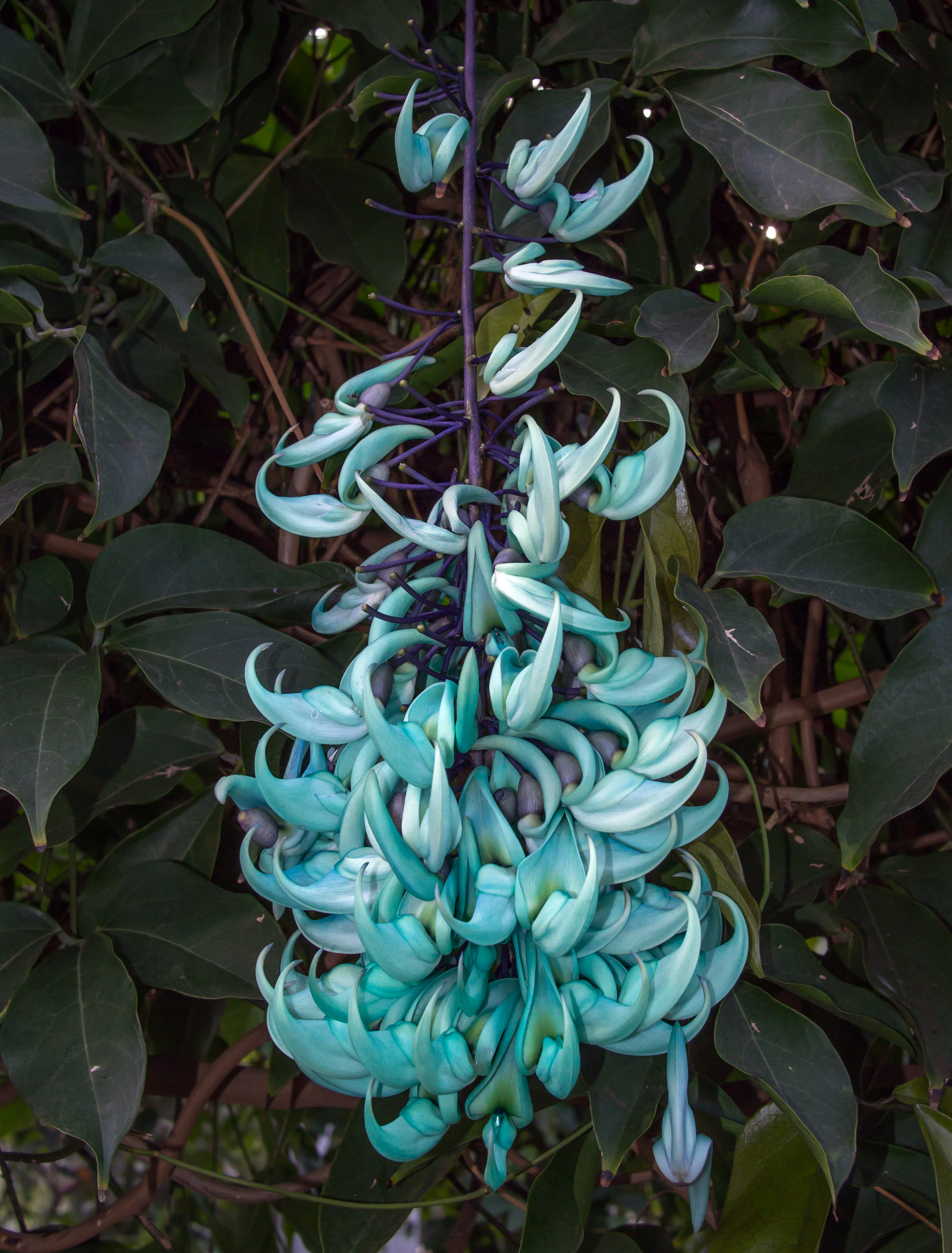
- Strongylodon macrobotrys

Scientific classification
- Kingdom: Plantae
- Clade: Embryophytes
- Clade: Tracheophytes
- Clade: Spermatophytes
- Clade: Angiosperms
- Clade: Eudicots
- Clade: Rosids
- Order: Fabales
- Family: Fabaceae
- Subfamily: Faboideae
- Tribe: Phaseoleae
- Genus: Strongylodon; Vogel (1836)

Species
- 16; see text

= Strongylodon =

Genus of legumes

Strongylodon is a genus of flowering plants in the legume family, Fabaceae. It includes 16 species of lianas native to the western Pacific, from the Philippines and Sulawesi to New Guinea, Queensland, and the south Pacific, and to Madagascar, Réunion, and the Comoro and Andaman Islands in the Indian Ocean. Typical habitats are tropical rain forest, thicket, or secondary vegetation, often in wetlands and near water. Some species can grow up to 40 meters long. The genus belongs to the subfamily Faboideae. The most well-known species in the genus is Strongylodon macrobotrys, also known as jade vine.

== Taxonomy ==
The genus was named by Julius Rudolph Theodor Vogel in 1836. The genus name derives from strongylos "round", and odous "tooth", referring to the rounded teeth of the jade vine's calyx.

== Species ==
16 species are accepted:

- Strongylodon archboldianus Merr. & L.M.Perry
- Strongylodon caeruleus Merr.
- Strongylodon celebicus S.F.Huang
- Strongylodon crassifolius Perkins
- Strongylodon craveniae R.Baron & Baker
- Strongylodon decipiens Verdc.
- Strongylodon elmeri Merr.
- Strongylodon juangonzalezii Hadsall, Alejado & Cajano
- Strongylodon loheri S.F.Huang
- Strongylodon lucidus (G.Forst.) Seem.
- Strongylodon macrobotrys A.Gray
- Strongylodon madagascariensis Baker
- Strongylodon pulcher C.B.Rob.
- Strongylodon ruber Vogel
- Strongylodon siderospermus Cordem.
- Strongylodon zschokkei Elmer
- Strongylodon rubriflorus Whistler. (2022!)
