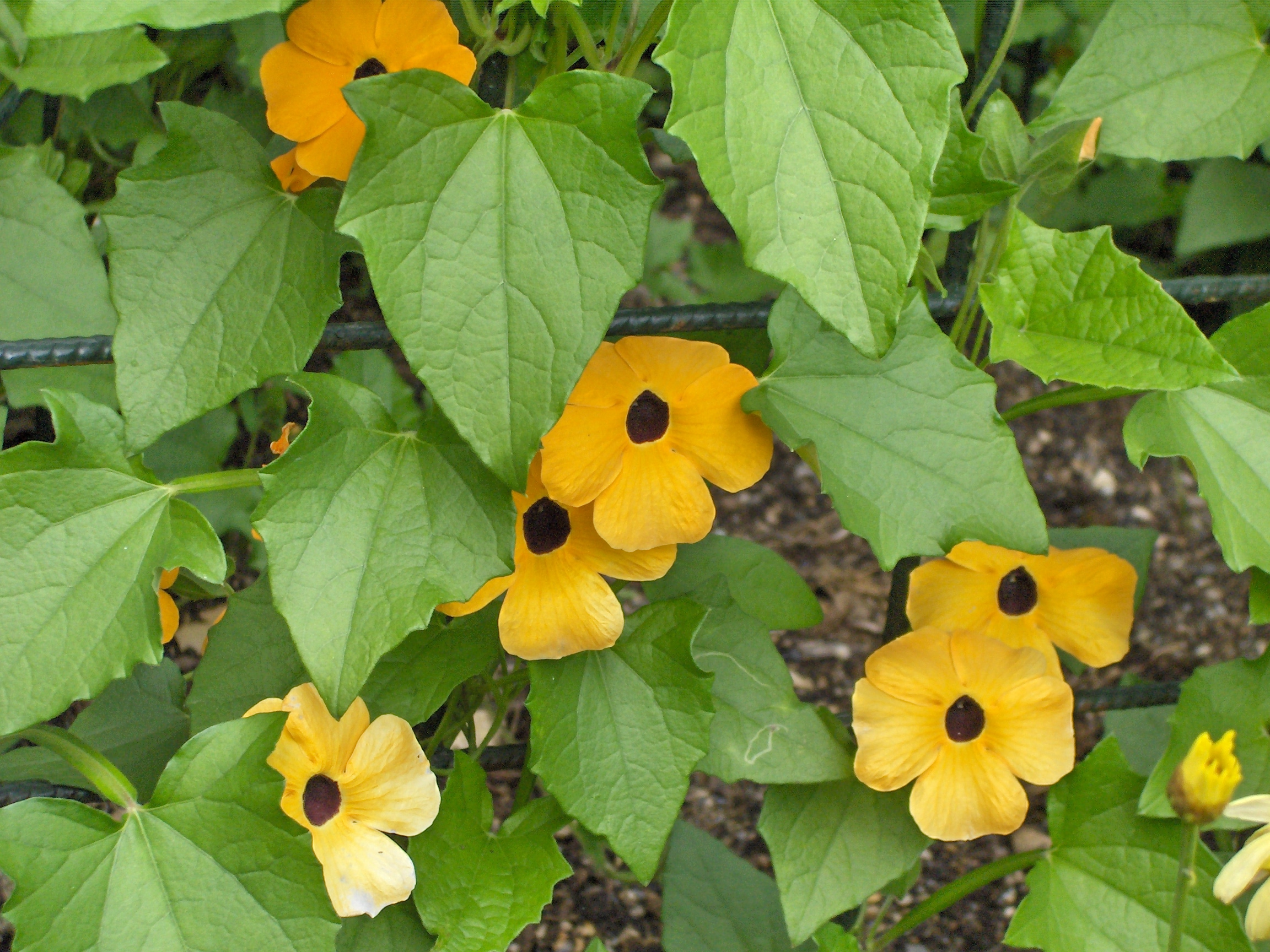
- Thunbergia alata

Scientific classification
- Kingdom: Plantae
- Clade: Tracheophytes
- Clade: Angiosperms
- Clade: Eudicots
- Clade: Asterids
- Order: Lamiales
- Family: Acanthaceae
- Subfamily: Thunbergioideae; T. Anderson, 1860.

Type genus
- Thunbergia

Genera
- See text

= Thunbergioideae =

Subfamily of flowering plants

Thunbergioideae is a subfamily of plants in the family Acanthaceae.

== Genera ==
The USDA-ARS Germplasm Resources Information Network (GRIN) includes:

1. Anomacanthus R.D.Good
2. Mendoncia Vell. ex Vand.
3. Pseudocalyx Radlk.
4. Thunbergia Retz. (synonym Meyenia Nees)
