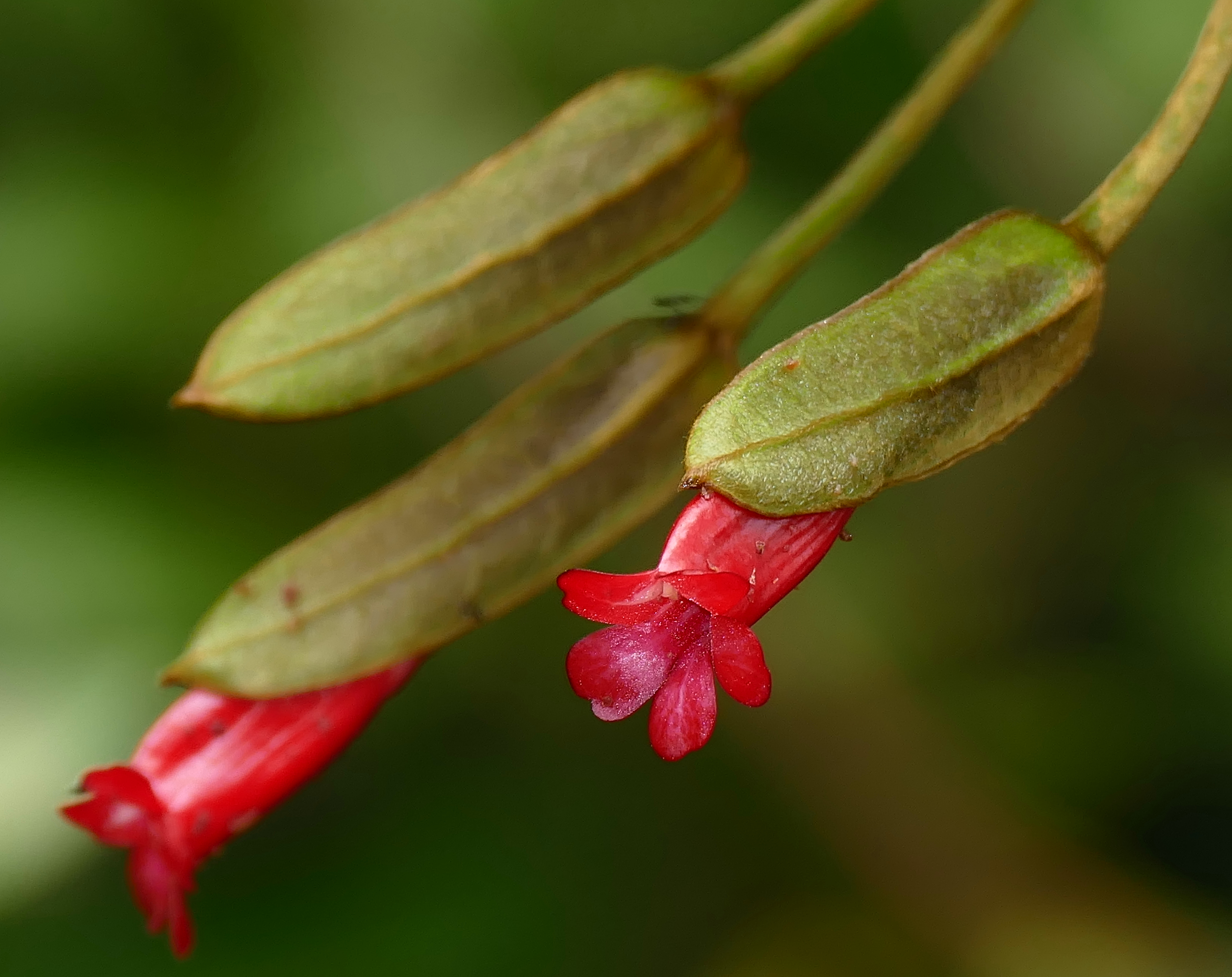
- Mendoncia hoffmannseggiana

Scientific classification
- Kingdom: Plantae
- Clade: Tracheophytes
- Clade: Angiosperms
- Clade: Eudicots
- Clade: Asterids
- Order: Lamiales
- Family: Acanthaceae
- Subfamily: Thunbergioideae
- Genus: Mendoncia; Vell. ex Vand.

Species
- See text

Synonyms
- Afromendoncia Gilg ex Lindau; Drupina L.; Engelia H.Karst. ex Nees; Lirayea Pierre; Monachochlamys Baker; Senkebergia Neck. ex Raf.

= Mendoncia =

Genus of flowering plants

Mendoncia is a genus of climbing plants in the family Acanthaceae.

It is native to the tropical Americas from southern Mexico to Paraguay and southern Brazil, and to tropical Africa and Madagascar. In South America, some of its species are endemic to Brazil in the Atlantic Forest and/or Cerrado ecoregions. In Africa the largest number of species is found in Cameroon and Gabon.

== Species ==
89 species are accepted.

- Mendoncia albiflora Leonard
- Mendoncia amabilis F.A.Silva
- Mendoncia antioquiensis Wassh.
- Mendoncia aspera Ruiz & Pav.
- Mendoncia aurea Leonard
- Mendoncia bahiensis Profice
- Mendoncia bivalvis (L.f.) Merr.
- Mendoncia blanchetiana Profice
- Mendoncia brenesii Standl. & Leonard
- Mendoncia camerounensis Breteler & Wieringa
- Mendoncia caquetensis Leonard
- Mendoncia cardonae Leonard
- Mendoncia clavulus Wassh.
- Mendoncia coccinea Vell.
- Mendoncia combretoides (A. Chev. ex Hutchinson & Dalziel) Benoist
- Mendoncia cordata Leonard
- Mendoncia coriacea Wassh.
- Mendoncia costaricana Oerst.
- Mendoncia cowanii (S.Moore) Benoist
- Mendoncia crenata Lindau
- Mendoncia cuatrecasasii Leonard
- Mendoncia decaryi (Benoist) E.Magnaghi
- Mendoncia delphina E.Magnaghi
- Mendoncia flagellaris (Baker) Benoist
- Mendoncia floribunda (Pierre) Benoist
- Mendoncia garciae Leonard
- Mendoncia gigas Lindau
- Mendoncia gilgiana (Lindau) Benoist
- Mendoncia gilva Leonard
- Mendoncia glabra Poepp.
- Mendoncia glabrescens Leonard
- Mendoncia glomerata Leonard
- Mendoncia guatemalensis Standl. & Steyerm.
- Mendoncia hitchcockii Wassh.
- Mendoncia hoffmannseggiana Nees
- Mendoncia hollenbergiae Wassh.
- Mendoncia hymenophyllacea Rizzini
- Mendoncia iodioides (S.Moore) Heine
- Mendoncia kely E.Magnaghi
- Mendoncia killipii Leonard
- Mendoncia klugii Leonard
- Mendoncia lasiophyta Leonard
- Mendoncia leucantha Leonard
- Mendoncia lindaviana (Gilg) Benoist
- Mendocia lindavii Rusby
- Mendoncia lindavii Rusby
- Mendoncia litoralis Leonard
- Mendoncia meyeniana Nees
- Mendoncia microchlamys Leonard
- Mendoncia mirabilis Leonard
- Mendoncia mollis Lindau
- Mendoncia multiflora Poepp.
- Mendoncia mutisii Leonard
- Mendoncia neblinensis Wassh.
- Mendoncia obovata Lindau
- Mendoncia odorata Leonard
- Mendoncia orbicularis Turrill
- Mendoncia pedunculata Leonard
- Mendoncia pennellii Leonard
- Mendoncia peruviana Leonard
- Mendoncia phalacra Leonard
- Mendoncia phytocrenoides (Gilg ex Lindau) Benoist
- Mendoncia pilosa Mart.
- Mendoncia puberula Mart.
- Mendoncia quadrata Wassh.
- Mendoncia rabiensis Breteler & Wieringa
- Mendoncia retusa Turrill
- Mendoncia rizziniana Profice
- Mendoncia robusta Rusby
- Mendoncia rosea Leonard
- Mendoncia rotundifolia Poepp.
- Mendoncia sericea Leonard ex Wassh.
- Mendoncia smithii Leonard
- Mendoncia speciosa Nees
- Mendoncia spraguei Turrill
- Mendoncia sprucei Lindau
- Mendoncia squamuliger Nees
- Mendoncia steyermarkii Wassh.
- Mendoncia tarapotana Lindau
- Mendoncia tessmannii Mildbr.
- Mendoncia tetragona Leonard
- Mendoncia tomentosa Poepp. ex Nees
- Mendoncia tonduzii Turrill
- Mendoncia tovarensis (Klotzsch & H.Karst. ex Nees) Leonard
- Mendoncia trichota Leonard
- Mendoncia velloziana Mart.
- Mendoncia villosa (Klotzsch & H.Karst. ex Nees) Leonard
- Mendoncia vinciflora Benoist
- Mendoncia williamsii Wassh.
- Mendoncia zarucchii Wassh.
