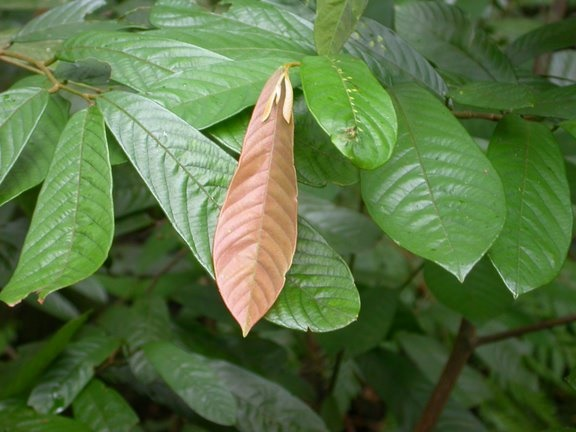
- Fissistigma oldhamii

Scientific classification
- Kingdom: Plantae
- Clade: Tracheophytes
- Clade: Angiosperms
- Clade: Magnoliids
- Order: Magnoliales
- Family: Annonaceae
- Genus: Fissistigma; Griff.

= Fissistigma =

Genus of flowering plants

Fissistigma is a genus of flowering plants in the family Annonaceae. There are 59 species distributed in Africa, Asia and Oceania.

== Species ==
As of January 2025, Plants of the World Online accept the following 59 species:

- Fissistigma acuminatissimum Merr.
- Fissistigma affine (Craib) Kessler
- Fissistigma balansae (Aug.DC.) Merr.
- Fissistigma bicolor (Roxb.) Merr.
- Fissistigma breviflorum (Ridl.) I.M.Turner
- Fissistigma brevistipitatum I.M.Turner
- Fissistigma bygravei I.M.Turner
- Fissistigma carrii I.M.Turner
- Fissistigma cavaleriei (H.Lév.) Rehder
- Fissistigma chloroneurum (Hand.-Mazz.) Chun
- Fissistigma chrysosericeum (Finet & Gagnep.) Merr.
- Fissistigma cinerascens (Miq.) Merr.
- Fissistigma crassicaule I.M.Turner
- Fissistigma cupreonitens Merr. & Chun
- Fissistigma ellipticum (King) Debika Mitra
- Fissistigma elmeri Merr.
- Fissistigma fulgens (Hook.f. & Thomson) Merr.
- Fissistigma glaucescens (Hance) Merr.
- Fissistigma hypoglaucum (Miq.) Merr.
- Fissistigma kinabaluense (Stapf) Merr.
- Fissistigma kingii (Boerl.) Burkill
- Fissistigma kwangsiense Y.Tsiang & P.T.Li
- Fissistigma lanuginosum (Hook.f. & Thomson) Merr.
- Fissistigma latifolium (Dunal) Merr.
- Fissistigma litseifolium (King) Merr.
- Fissistigma longipes Merr.
- Fissistigma longipetalum (Ridl.) Merr.
- Fissistigma maclurei Merr.
- Fissistigma manubriatum (Hook.f. & Thomson) Merr.
- Fissistigma minuticalyx (R.W.MacGregor & W.W.Sm.) Chatterjee
- Fissistigma montanum I.M.Turner
- Fissistigma multivenium (Diels) I.M.Turner
- Fissistigma oblongum (Craib) Merr.
- Fissistigma oldhamii (Hemsl.) Merr.
- Fissistigma ovoideum (King) Merr.
- Fissistigma pallens (Finet & Gagnep.) Merr.
- Fissistigma paniculatum (Ridl.) Merr.
- Fissistigma poilanei (Ast) Y.Tsiang & P.T.Li
- Fissistigma polyanthoides (Aug.DC.) Merr.
- Fissistigma polyanthum (Hook.f. & Thomson) Merr.
- Fissistigma retusum (H.Lév.) Rehder
- Fissistigma rubiginosum (A.DC.) Merr.
- Fissistigma rufinerve (Hook.f. & Thomson) Merr.
- Fissistigma rugosum J.Sinclair
- Fissistigma santapaui D.Das
- Fissistigma scandens Griff.
- Fissistigma shangtzeense P.T.Li
- Fissistigma sumatrana Irawan
- Fissistigma taynguyenense Bân
- Fissistigma thorelii (Pierre ex Finet & Gagnep.) Merr.
- Fissistigma tientangense Y.Tsiang & P.T.Li
- Fissistigma tonkinense (Finet & Gagnep.) Merr.
- Fissistigma tungfangense Y.Tsiang & P.T.Li
- Fissistigma uonicum (Dunn) Merr.
- Fissistigma verrucosum (Hook.f. & Thomson) Merr.
- Fissistigma villosissimum Merr.
- Fissistigma wallichii (Hook.f. & Thomson) Merr.
- Fissistigma xylopetalum Y.Tsiang & P.T.Li
- Fissistigma zippelii (Miq.) Merr.
