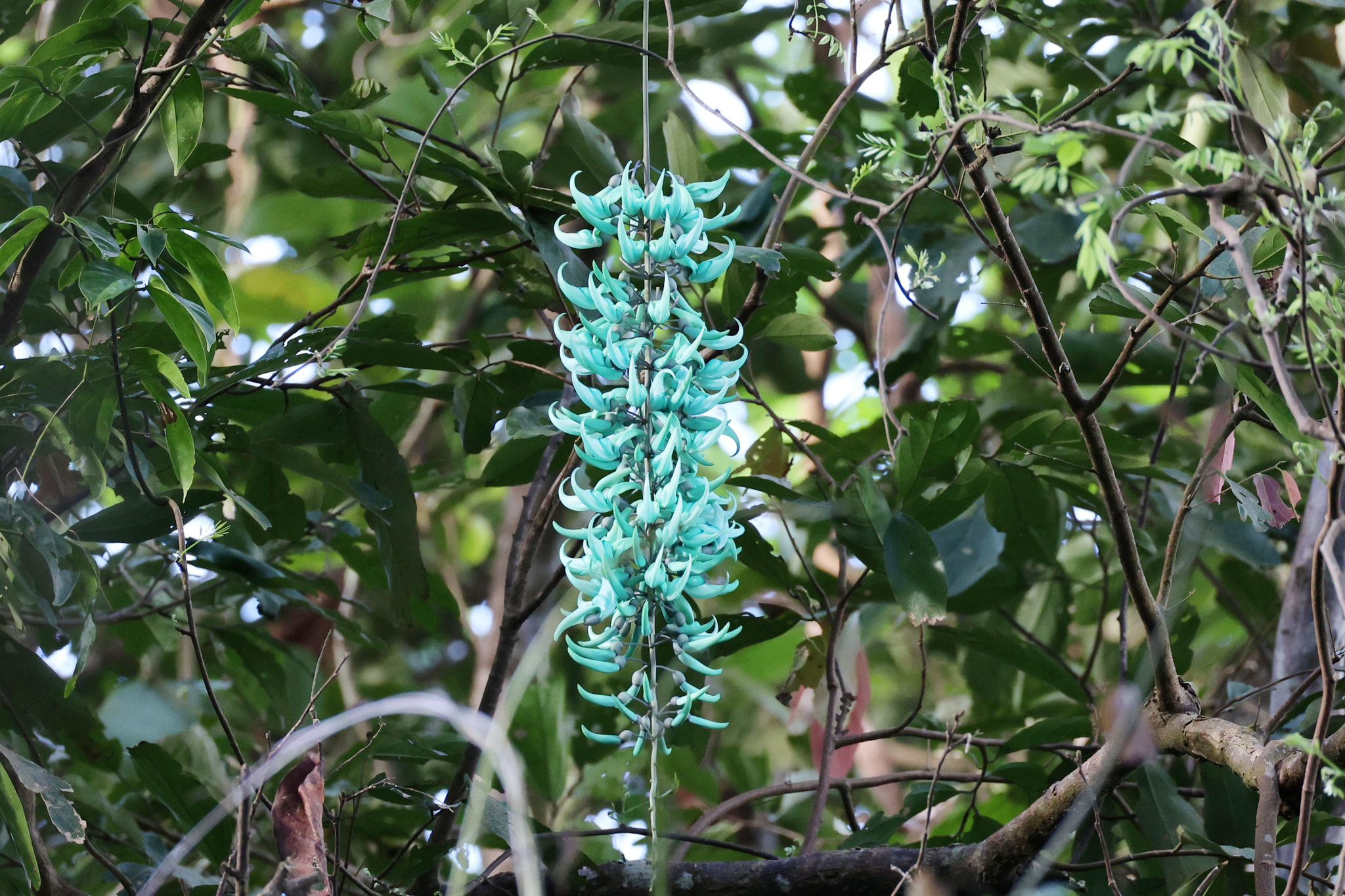
- Strongylodon macrobotrys at Bagong Silang, Los Baños, Laguna, Philippines

Scientific classification
- Kingdom: Plantae
- Clade: Tracheophytes
- Clade: Angiosperms
- Clade: Eudicots
- Clade: Rosids
- Order: Fabales
- Family: Fabaceae
- Subfamily: Faboideae
- Genus: Strongylodon
- Species: S. macrobotrys

Binomial name
- Strongylodon macrobotrys A.Gray

Synonyms
- Strongylodon megaphyllus Merr.; Strongylodon warburgii Perkins

= Strongylodon macrobotrys =

Edible flowers from the Philippines

Strongylodon macrobotrys, commonly known as the jade vine, emerald vine, or turquoise jade vine, is a leguminous vine endemic to the Philippines. It is a popular ornamental plant known for its cascading clusters of vibrant turquoise or greenish-blue claw-shaped flowers. Cultivating jade vine requires a tropical environment, making it a popular choice in botanical gardens and conservatories. The plant's striking appearance and limited distribution contribute to its allure among plant enthusiasts worldwide.

== Origins ==
Strongylodon macrobotrys was first recorded by American explorers in 1841. Specimens from the plant were collected from the jungled slopes of Mount Makiling, on the Philippines’ Luzon Island, by members of the United States Exploring Expedition. The plant was described by the Harvard-based botanist Asa Gray, who also described thousands of other plants brought back by the multi-ship American expedition. Plants were collected from various countries including Honolulu and Antarctica. Gray had disagreed with Lt. Charles Wilkes, the U.S. Navy officer who had led the expedition and elected not to join the voyage itself. The expedition involved several violent altercations with indigenous populations. Wilkes was court-martialed at the end of the expedition but was acquitted.

Its species epithet macrobotrys means “long grape cluster”, from the Greek makros "long" and botrys "bunch of grapes", referring to the fruit; the genus name derives from strongylos "round", and odous "tooth", referring to the rounded teeth of the calyx.

== Description ==
It has thick stems up to 2 cm in diameter, which it uses to crawl up tall trees to reach sunlight. Its stems can reach up to 18 m in length. The vine entwines itself through its host's trunk and branches. Like kudzu, which also belongs to the same subfamily, jade vine can completely smother dead, dying or severely damaged trees.

Its pale green foliage spreads over the canopy and is arranged alternately. Each leaf consists of three oblong leaflets with mucronate tips, the middle leaflet is the largest.

=== Flowers ===
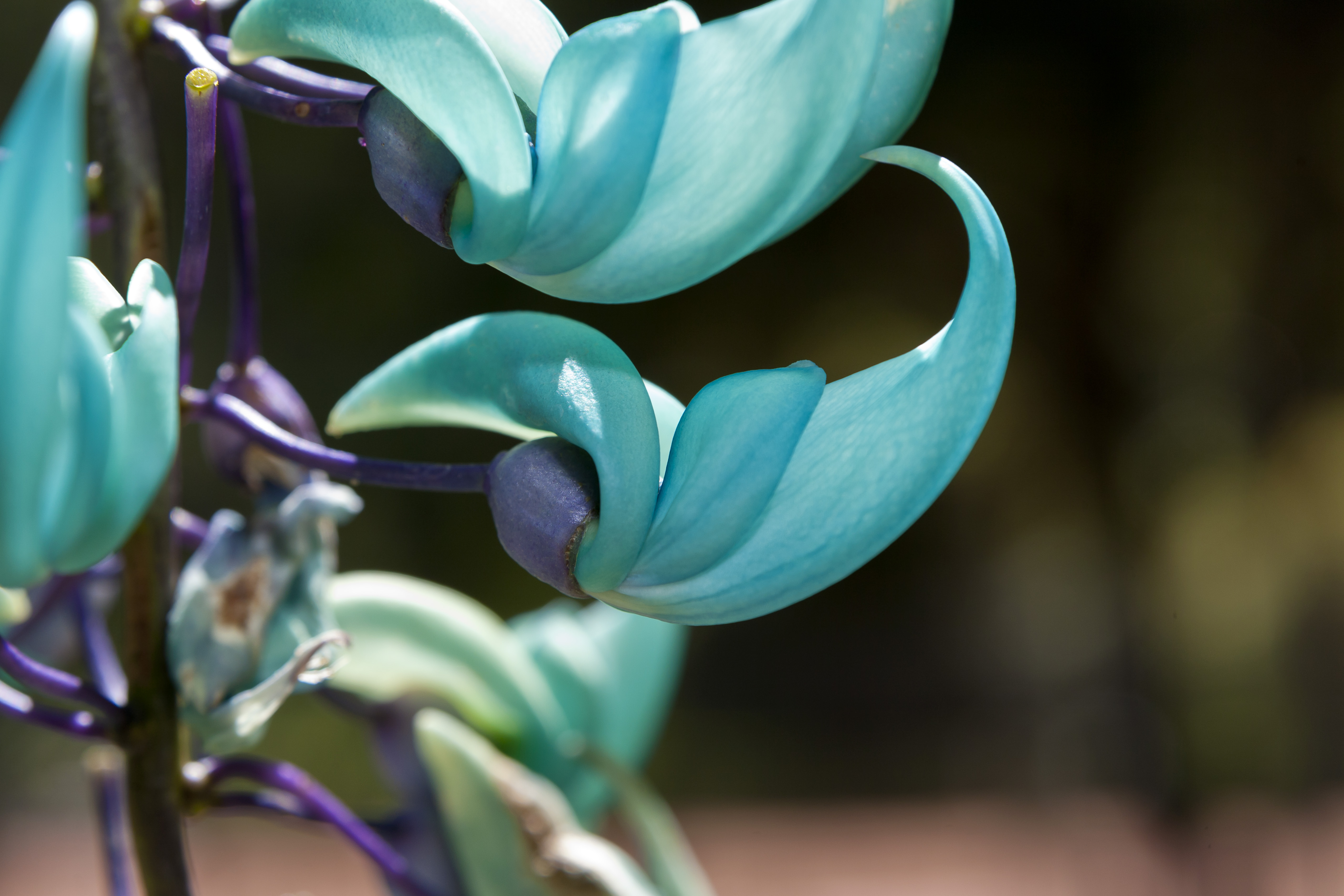
Close-up of the flower.

The claw-shaped or beak-shaped flowers are carried in pendent trusses or pseudoracemes of 75 or more flowers. The trusses can reach as much as 3 m long. The turquoise flower color is similar to some forms of the minerals turquoise and jade, varying from blue-green to mint green.

The flowers hang like clusters of grapes from inflorescences produced by mature vines. Each bloom resembles a stout-bodied butterfly with folded wings; they have evolved certain modifications to allow them to be pollinated by a species of bat that hangs upside down on the inflorescence to drink its nectar.

Their bright coloration is an example of copigmentation, a result of the presence of malvin (an anthocyanin) and saponarin (a flavone glucoside) in the ratio 1:9. Under the alkaline conditions (pH 7.9) found in the sap of the epidermal cells, this combination produced a pink pigmentation; the pH of the colorless inner floral tissue was found to be lower, at pH 5.6. Experiments showed that saponarin produced a strong yellow colouring in slightly alkaline conditions, resulting in the greenish tone of the flower.

=== Fruit ===
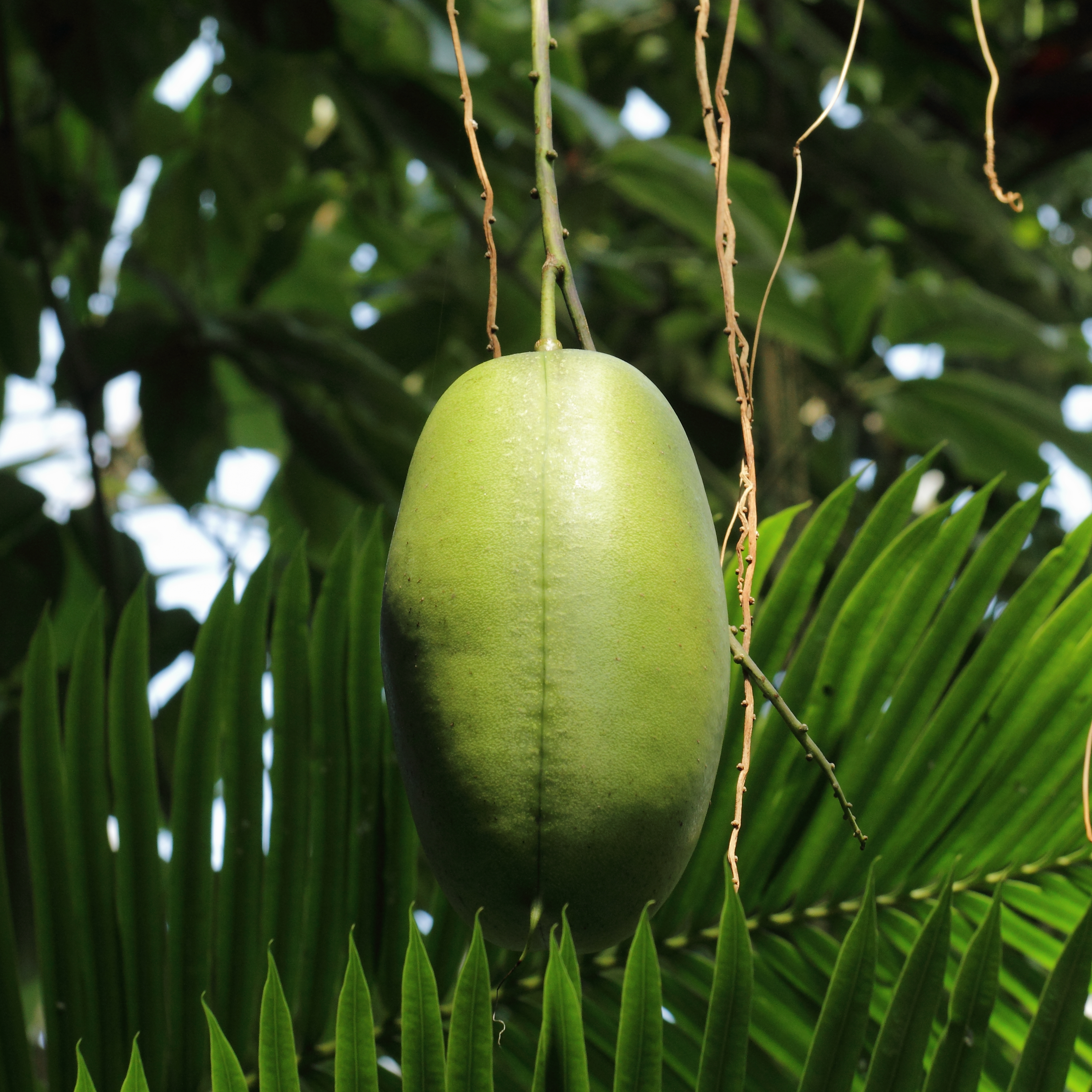
Jade vine fruit

The short, oblong, fleshy seedpods are up to 15 cm long and contain up to 12 seeds. The jade vine is bat-pollinated in the wild, thus it must be hand-pollinated in greenhouses to bear its fruit, which can grow to be melon-sized. This has been done over the years at the Royal Botanic Gardens at Kew Gardens in England, where seed conservation is an ongoing focus, especially in the face of loss of rainforest habitat.

== Habitat and pollinators ==
The plant grows beside streams in damp forests, or in ravines.

There are several other species of Strongylodon, but the superficially similar red jade vine, Mucuna bennettii, is a species belonging to a different genus, Mucuna. It seems to be endemic to the Philippines and is usually found in forests. Propagation has always been difficult. It is considered an endangered species due to the destruction of its habitat and the decrease of its natural pollinators. There seems to be a method of marcotting through mature woody stems. It is best planted in ground near a water source, but not inundated.

== Cultivation ==
Strongylodon macrobotrys is not frost-tolerant; it needs a minimum temperature of 15 °C (59 °F), and in colder latitudes the plant must be grown in a large glasshouse or conservatory. It is prized in tropical and subtropical gardens for its showy flowers which are a highly unusual color, unlike that of almost any other plant. It is usually grown over a pergola or other tall support to display the spectacular cascading flower trusses which are produced generously once the vine is mature (after 2 years or more, depending on pruning regime). Curiously, on a large plant, the pale-colored blooms can be difficult to see in strong sunlight and could be overlooked if not for the fallen blooms below the vine. Fallen blooms change color as they dry out, from mint green to blue-green to purple. The seed pods are not formed in cultivation, but by mimicking the actions of the natural pollinators, Kew Gardens has been successful in pollinating the flowers and producing seeds. Propagation is also possible from nodal cuttings.

=== Uses ===
Jade vine flowers are edible. People of its native island of Luzon (name in Tagalog: tayabak) eat them as vegetables in a similar manner as katurai. In Hawaii, they are often used to make lei.

== Pests and diseases ==
Although well known in other Fabaceae, including soybeans, the Soybean mosaic virus has only recently been found in S. macrobotrys in Brazil (University of São Paulo, Piracicaba, São Paulo state). Whether S. macrobotrys is commonly infected, and whether it serves as a virus reservoir for nearby soybean fields, will need to be investigated.

== Gallery ==
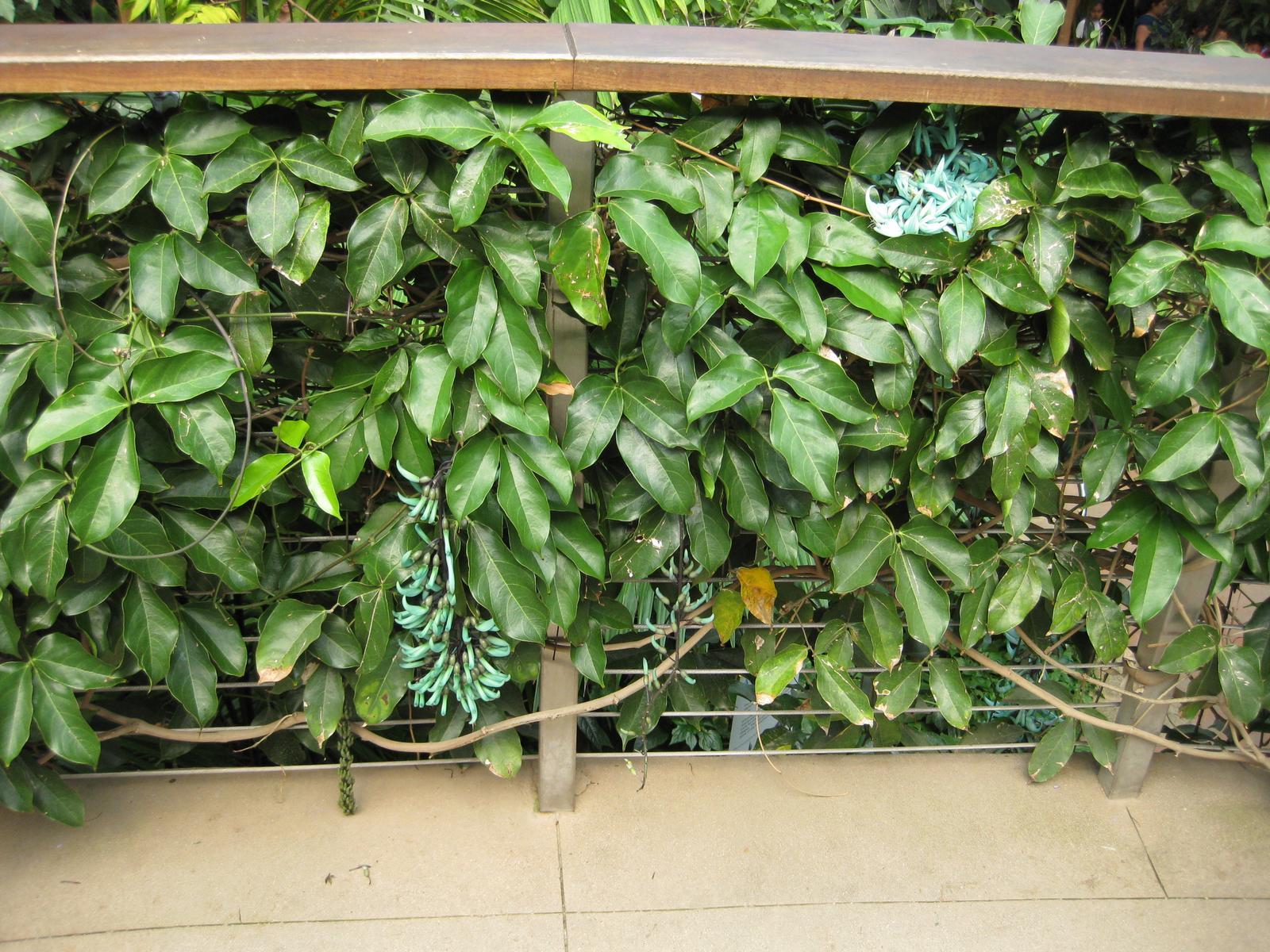
Huntington Gardens (Los Angeles)

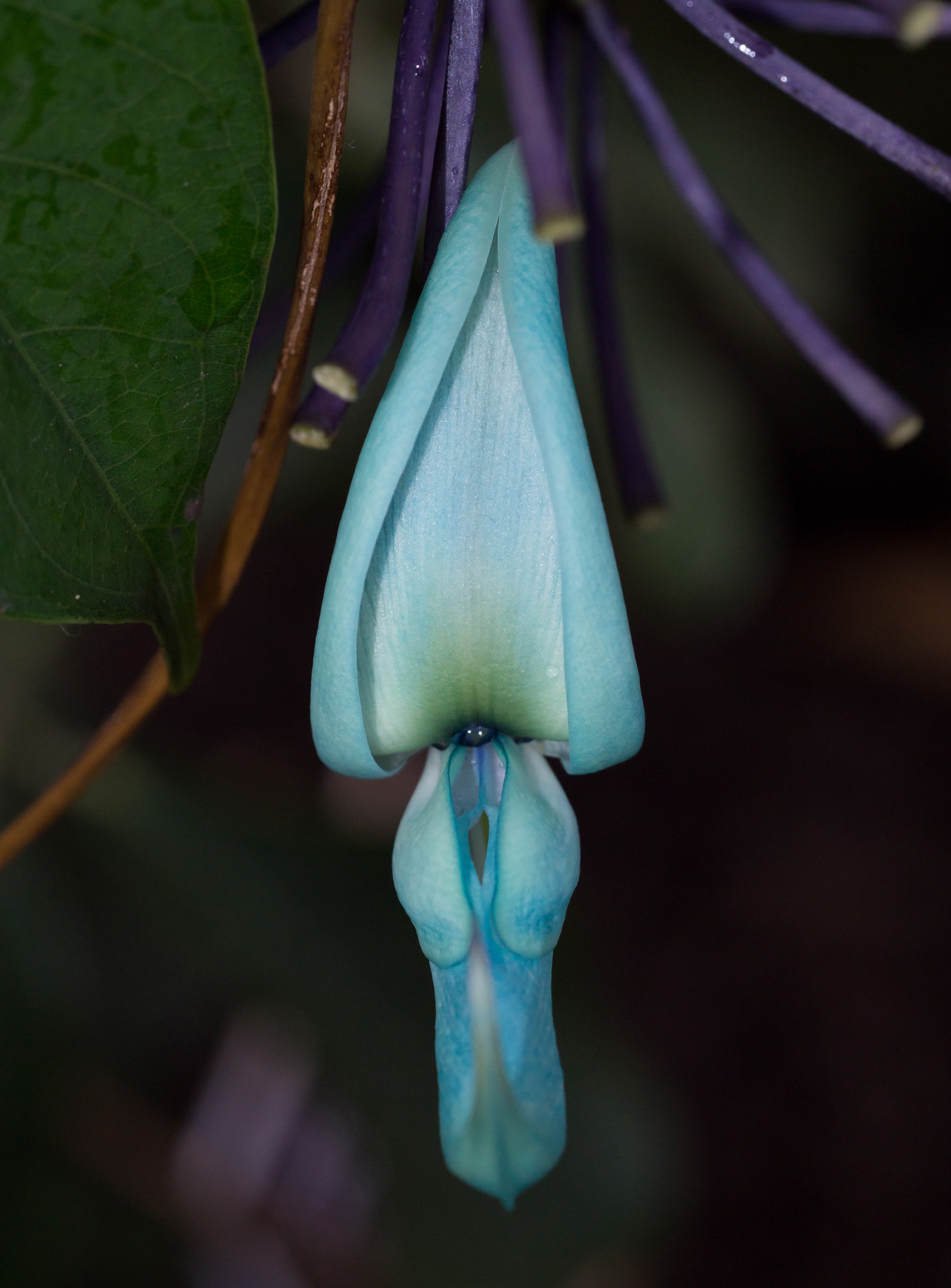
A single flower

Time lapse

Time lapse

Time lapse

== See also ==
- Strongylodon juangonzalezii, a related species with purple to blue flowers, also endemic to the Philippines
