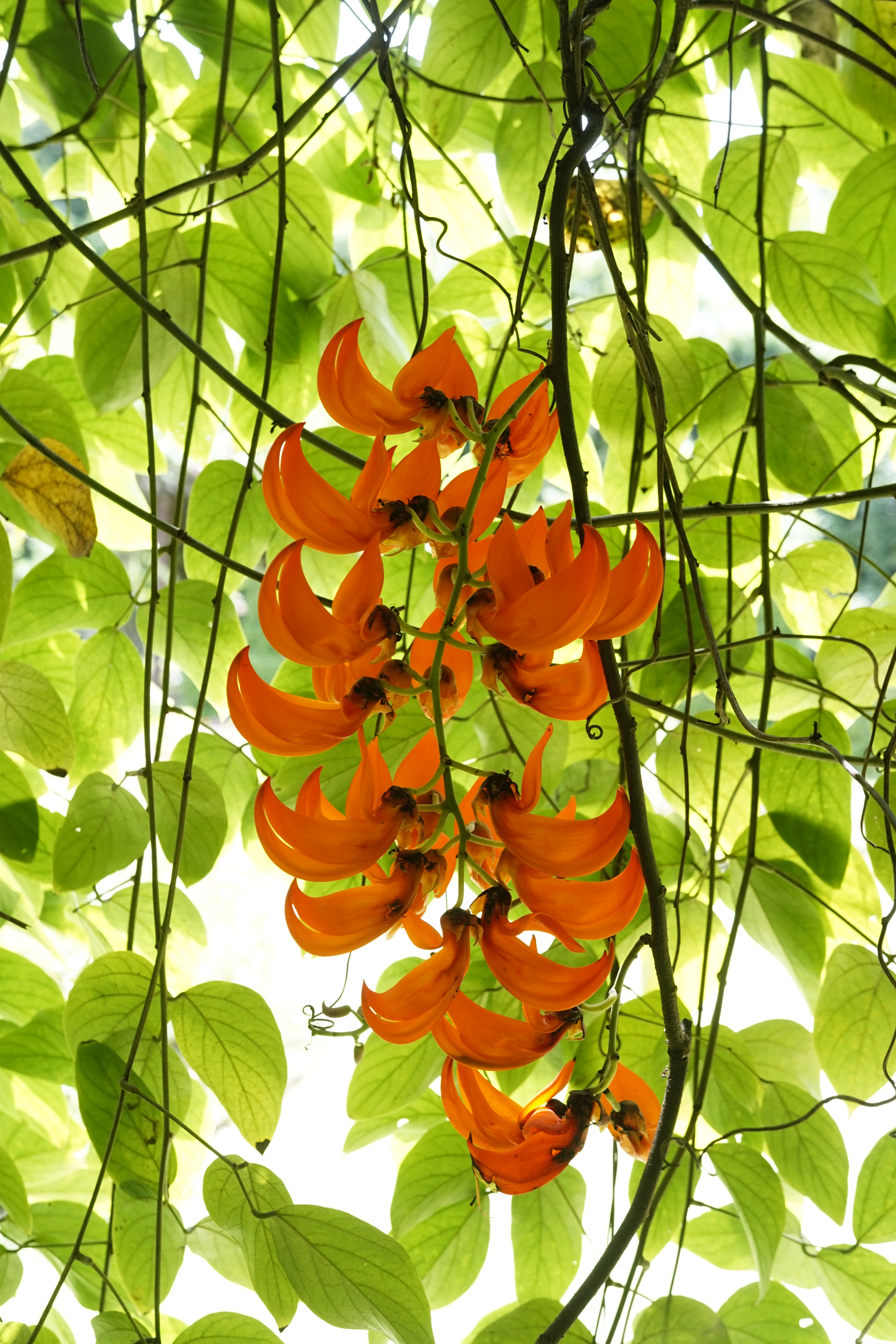

Conservation status
- Least Concern (IUCN 3.1)

Scientific classification
- Kingdom: Plantae
- Clade: Tracheophytes
- Clade: Angiosperms
- Clade: Eudicots
- Clade: Rosids
- Order: Fabales
- Family: Fabaceae
- Subfamily: Faboideae
- Genus: Mucuna
- Species: M. bennettii

Binomial name
- Mucuna bennettii F.Muell.

= Mucuna bennettii =

Species of legume

Mucuna bennettii, commonly known as New Guinea creeper, red jade vine or flame of the forest, is a species of flowering plant in the family Fabaceae, that is distributed from Sulawesi to Vanuatu.

The species was formally described by Victorian government botanist Ferdinand von Mueller in 1876. It has glossy, green leaves on twining stems and long pendants of claw-like, fiery scarlet flowers.

== See also ==
- Jade vine
