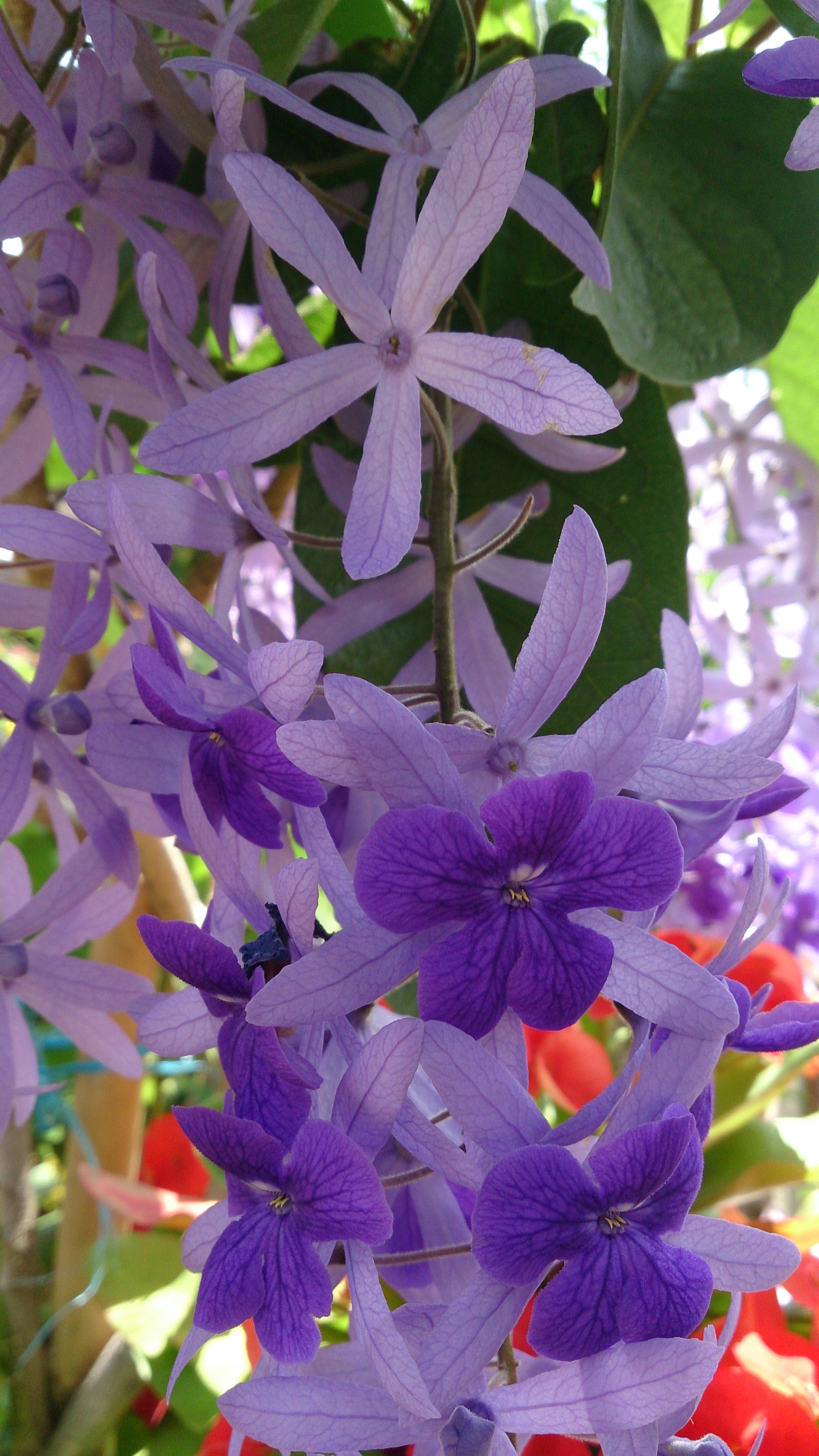
- Petrea volubilis

Scientific classification
- Kingdom: Plantae
- Clade: Tracheophytes
- Clade: Angiosperms
- Clade: Eudicots
- Clade: Asterids
- Order: Lamiales
- Family: Verbenaceae
- Genus: Petrea; L.

Synonyms
- Xolocotzia Miranda

= Petrea =

Genus of flowering plants

Petrea is a genus of evergreen flowering vines native to tropical Americas, ranging from Florida and northeastern Mexico to Bolivia, Paraguay, and southern Brazil.

The genus was named in honour of Robert James Petre, an English patron of botany.

== Species ==
14 species are accepted.

- Petrea aspera Turcz.
- Petrea asperifolia (Miranda) Hammel
- Petrea blanchetiana Schauer
- Petrea bracteata Steud.
- Petrea brevicalyx Ducke
- Petrea campinae Rueda
- Petrea guianensis Cham.
- Petrea insignis Schauer
- Petrea macrostachya Benth.
- Petrea maynensis Huber
- Petrea pubescens Turcz.
- Petrea rugosa Kunth
- Petrea sulphurea Jans.-Jac.
- Petrea volubilis L.
