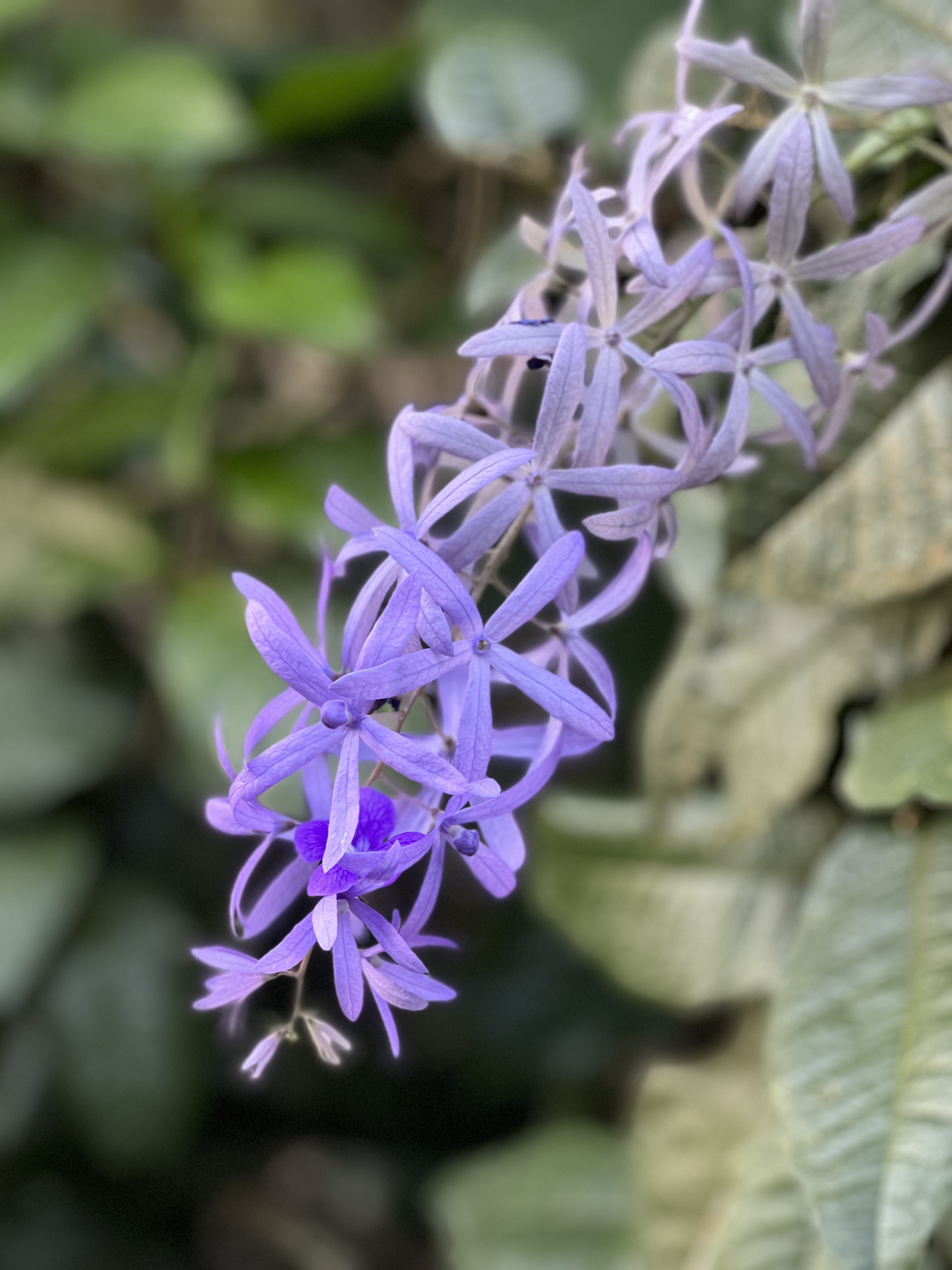

Scientific classification
- Kingdom: Plantae
- Clade: Tracheophytes
- Clade: Angiosperms
- Clade: Eudicots
- Clade: Asterids
- Order: Lamiales
- Family: Verbenaceae
- Genus: Petrea
- Species: P. volubilis

Binomial name
- Petrea volubilis L.

= Petrea volubilis =

Species of plant

Petrea volubilis, commonly known as purple wreath, queen's wreath or sandpaper vine, is an evergreen flowering vine in the family Verbenaceae, native to tropical America, that is valued especially for its display of violet flowers.

== Description ==
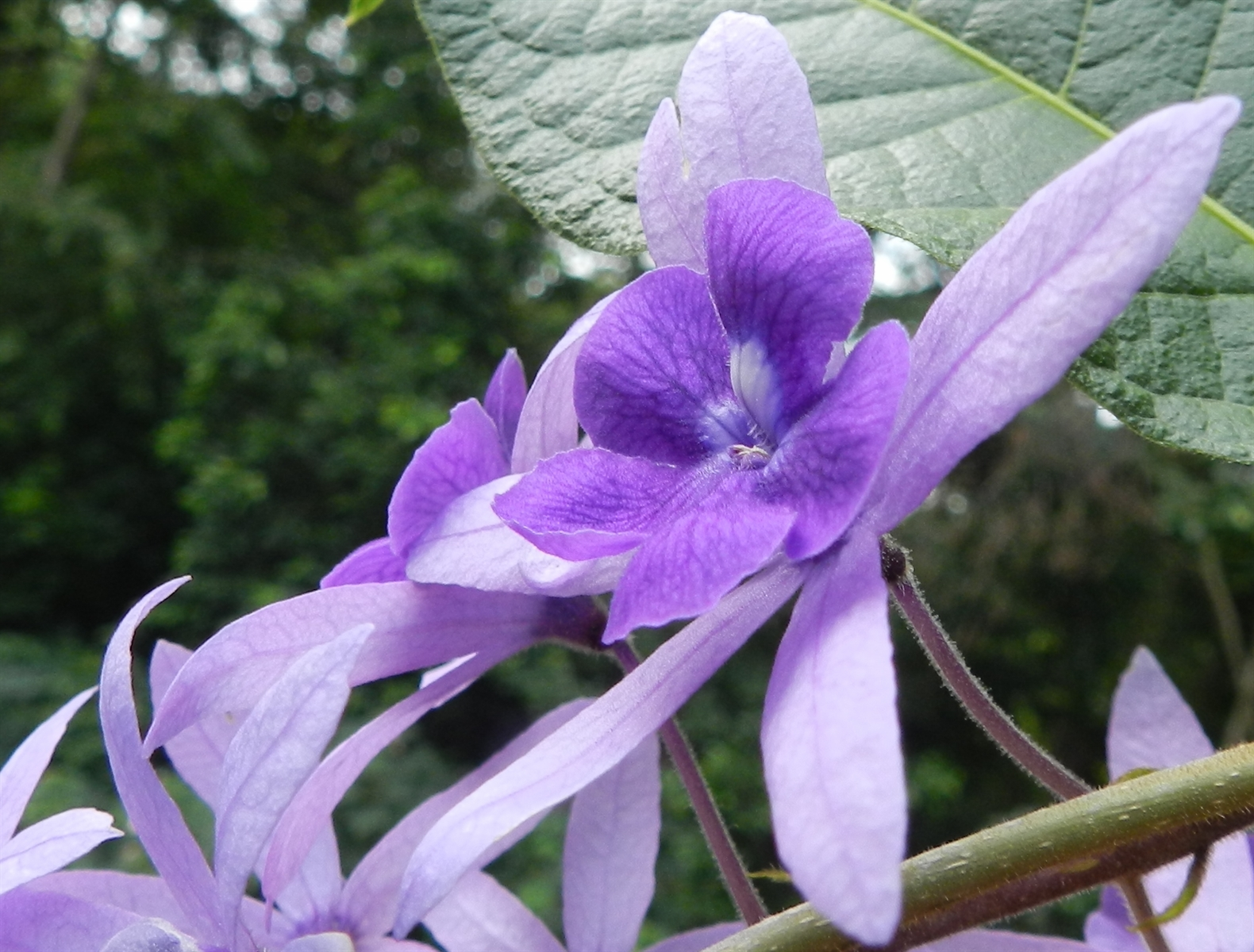

As a climbing plant, it grows to a height of 12 m (39 ft), but as a shrub it grows to 4 m (13 ft) tall. It is a vine or semi-climbing shrub with puberulent stems, sometimes reaching 10 cm (3.9 in) in diameter. Leaves are elliptical-oblong, 5–16 cm long and 3–8 cm wide, apex acute or obtuse, base wedge-shaped, entire margin, sometimes sinuous, glabrous or pubescent, rough to the touch; petiole 0.2–1 cm long.

The flowers emerge from bracts. Racemose inflorescences 8–20 cm long, axillary or terminal, solitary, puberulent rachis, 5-mere flowers on puberulent pedicels supported by a deciduous bract; calyx tube 0.2–0.7 cm long, glabrous or puberulent, corolla infundibuliform, 1 cm long, puberulent, blue; ovary and glabrous style. Drupaceous fruit completely enclosed in the acrid calyx which acts as wings or floats.

== Distribution and habitat ==
It is found especially on the banks of rivers and streams, from northern Mexico to Bolivia, Brazil and Paraguay in the Antilles and in Venezuela. Depending on the climate, it can have up to two blooms in the year. Its very nectar-bearing flowers attract butterflies.

== Cultivation ==
In temperate climates, Petrea volubilis prefers full sun and can tolerate shade, although it will not flower profusely. It handles a very light and fleeting frost at temperatures down to -2 °C, but beyond this threshold the plant would die. It thrives in well drained, fertile soils and can tolerate drought.

The Wayapi ethnic group traditionally uses a preparation with sap to treat burns, wounds, inflammation and abscesses, and in the Caribbean it is used to treat diarrhea.
