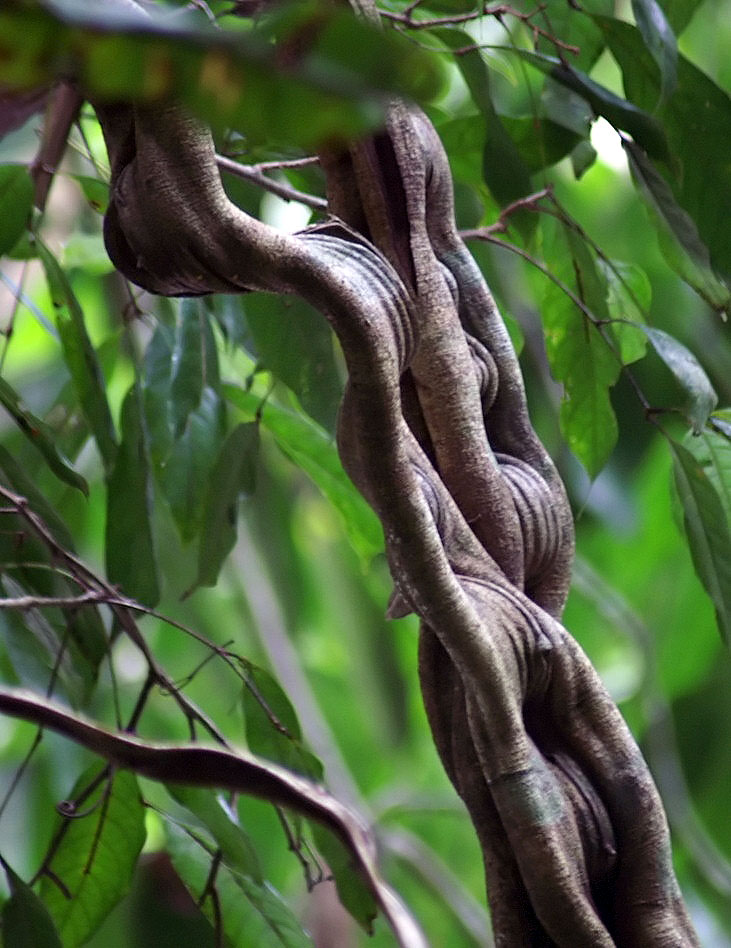
- In Corcovado National Park, Costa Rica

Scientific classification
- Kingdom: Plantae
- Clade: Tracheophytes
- Clade: Angiosperms
- Clade: Eudicots
- Clade: Rosids
- Order: Fabales
- Family: Fabaceae
- Genus: Bauhinia
- Species: B. glabra

Binomial name
- Bauhinia glabra Jacq.

Synonyms
- Bauhinia columbiensis Vogel; Caulotretus heterophyllus (Kunth) Warb.; Bauhinia heterophylla Kunth; Binaria hondurensis (Standl.) A.Schmitz; Schnella heterophylla (Kunth) Benth.; Bauhinia standleyi Rose; Bauhinia hondurensis Standl.; Schnella glabra (Jacq.) Dugand; Bauhinia suaveolens Kunth; Schnella standleyi (Rose) Britton & Rose; Schnella columbiensis Benth.; Bauhinia storkii (Britton & Rose) Standl.; Schnella storkii Britton & Rose; Schnella brachystachya Benth.; Bauhinia brachystachya (Benth.) Walp.; Binaria cumanensis (Kunth) Raf.; Schnella cumanensis (Kunth) Britton & Rose; Bauhinia cumanensis Kunth

= Bauhinia glabra =

Species of legume

Bauhinia glabra, also commonly referred to as the monkey step/ladder, is more often introduced with its accepted name, whereas Bauhinia cumanensis, is a synonym for the plant name. B. glabra is located in the tropical climates of countries such as Venezuela, Trinidad and Tobago, Ecuador, Brazil, Costa Rica, Colombia and Guayana, while being introduced to Sri Lanka.

== Description ==
The growth habit of this plant is a shrub or small tree. This species is a climber meaning that it has a weak, very thin and long stem that spreads out of other trees for support. It can grow up to 65 feet high, with 2-lobed heart-shaped leaves that grow as long as 4-5 inches. The leaf arrangement is simple, alternate broad leaves. The venation of the leaves is pinnate. The inflorescence is determinate, meaning that the younger flowers grow towards the bottom of the axis, and the central flowers mature first, towards the top. The flower has about 5 petals, varying from red to yellow, and almost always has a fragrance, usually sweet. The plant is monoecious. The flower symmetry is bilateral meaning it only has the ability to be divided symmetrically one way.

== Ecology ==
B. glabra thrives in very acidic soils; it does not do well in salty conditions. The plant is an autotroph, and fixes nitrogen. It grows in tropical areas and shows optimal growth under full sun exposure. Abundant water is needed in the summer, and humidity is preferred during the winter. Therefore, its habitats include most areas in South America, Peru, India, and similar regions. This species begins flowering in the later portion of winter and continues on to bloom during early summer. There are also endophytic fungi on the surface of the plant creating a mycorrhizal relationship. Some create antibacterial and antioxidant properties. The species is mainly pollinated by bats, and dispersed by animals rather than wind.

== Cultivation and uses ==
B. glabra provides both medicinal and environmental uses. The name "monkey step" comes from the use of the vine, which is both woody and flexible. Hunters collect the vine and crush it, making it into a tincture (the extract if the plant dissolved into ethanol) and adding it to a "snake bottle", as a traditional treatment for snakebites. The bark and leaves are also used in a traditional herbal medicine against gall stones.
