= Ordinance Power =

Rulemaking authority of the president of the Philippines

Seal of the president of the Philippines

The Ordinance Power is the rulemaking authority of the president of the Philippines defined in Book III, Title I, Chapter II of the Administrative Code of 1987.

== Executive orders ==
Executive orders (Filipino: Kautusang tagapagpaganap), according to Book III, Title I, Chapter II, Section 2 of the Administrative Code of 1987, refer to the "Acts of the President providing for rules of a general or permanent character in implementation or execution of constitutional or statutory powers." Executive Order No. 292, which instituted the Administrative Code of 1987, is an example of an executive order.

== Administrative orders ==
Administrative orders (Filipino: Kautusang pampangasiwaan), according to Book III, Title I, Chapter II, Section 3 of the Administrative Code of 1987, refer to the "Acts of the President which relate to particular aspects of governmental operations in pursuance of his duties as administrative head shall be promulgated in administrative orders."

== Proclamations ==
Proclamations (Filipino: Pagpahayag), according to Book III, Title I, Chapter II, Section 4 of the Administrative Code of 1987, refer to the "Acts of the President fixing a date or declaring a status or condition of public moment or interest, upon the existence of which the operation of a specific law or regulation is made to depend." A notable example of a proclamation is Proclamation No. 1081, which declared martial law on September 23, 1972.

== Memorandum orders ==
Memorandum orders (Filipino: Kautusang Panandaan), according to Book III, Title I, Chapter II, Section 5 of the Administrative Code of 1987, refer to the "Acts of the President on matters of administrative detail or of subordinate or temporary interest which only concern a particular officer or office of the Government."

== Memorandum circulars ==
Memorandum circulars (Filipino: Panandaang Pang-ikot), according to Book III, Title I, Chapter II, Section 6 of the Administrative Code of 1987, refer to the "Acts of the President on matters relating to internal administration, which the President desires to bring to the attention of all or some of the departments, agencies, bureaus or offices of the Government, for information or compliance."

== General or special orders ==
General or special orders (Filipino: Panlahatan o tanging atas), according to Book III, Title I, Chapter II, Section 7 of the Administrative Code of 1987, refer to the "Acts and commands of the President in his capacity as Commander-in-Chief of the Armed Forces of the Philippines."
