= Saponarin =

Names
- IUPAC name 5-Hydroxy-6-(β-D-glucopyranosyl)-7-(β-D-glucopyranosyloxy)flavone
- Systematic IUPAC name 5-Hydroxy-2-(4-hydroxyphenyl)-6-[(2S,3R,4R,5S,6R)-3,4,5-trihydroxy-6-(hydroxymethyl)oxan-2-yl]-7-{[(2S,3R,4S,5S,6R)-3,4,5-trihydroxy-6-(hydroxymethyl)oxan-2-yl]oxy}-4H-1-benzopyran-4-one
- Other names Isovitexin-7-O-glucoside; Saponaretin-7-O-glucoside

Identifiers
CAS Number	20310-89-8
3D model (JSmol)	Interactive image
ChemSpider	390121
PubChem CID	441381
UNII	3081Z76OX9
CompTox Dashboard (EPA)	DTXSID10174201
- InChI: InChI=1S/C27H30O15/c28-7-15-19(32)22(35)24(37)26(40-15)18-14(41-27-25(38)23(36)20(33)16(8-29)42-27)6-13-17(21(18)34)11(31)5-12(39-13)9-1-3-10(30)4-2-9/h1-6,15-16,19-20,22-30,32-38H,7-8H2/t15-,16-,19-,20-,22+,23+,24-,25-,26+,27-/m1/s1 Key: HGUVPEBGCAVWID-KETMJRJWSA-N; InChI=1/C27H30O15/c28-7-15-19(32)22(35)24(37)26(40-15)18-14(41-27-25(38)23(36)20(33)16(8-29)42-27)6-13-17(21(18)34)11(31)5-12(39-13)9-1-3-10(30)4-2-9/h1-6,15-16,19-20,22-30,32-38H,7-8H2/t15-,16-,19-,20-,22+,23+,24-,25-,26+,27-/m1/s1 Key: HGUVPEBGCAVWID-KETMJRJWBK
- SMILES: c1cc(ccc1c2cc(=O)c3c(o2)cc(c(c3O)[C@H]4[C@@H]([C@H]([C@@H]([C@H](O4)CO)O)O)O)O[C@H]5[C@@H]([C@H]([C@@H]([C@H](O5)CO)O)O)O)O

Properties
Chemical formula	C_{27}H_{30}O_{15}
Molar mass	594.52 g/mol
- Except where otherwise noted, data are given for materials in their standard state (at 25 °C [77 °F], 100 kPa). Infobox references

Saponarin is a flavone type glucoside being a member of the chemical class saponins. It is found in many plants including Saponaria officinalis and in Strongylodon macrobotrys where it imparts the characteristic jade color to the flower. This coloration has been shown to be an example of copigmentation, a result of the presence of malvin (an anthocyanin) and saponarin in the ratio 1:9. Under the alkaline conditions (pH 7.9) found in the sap of the epidermal cells, this combination produced a blue-green pigmentation; the pH of the colorless inner floral tissue was found to be lower, at pH 5.6. Experiments showed that saponarin produced a strong yellow colouring in slightly alkaline conditions, resulting in the greenish tone of the flower. It is also found in passion flowers (Passiflora sp.).

Isoform 6 of saponarin (SO6, saponin S6) from the seeds of Saponaria officinalis is a ribosome-inactivating proteins.
