= Malvin =

Names
- IUPAC name 3,5-Bis(β-D-glucopyranosyloxy)-4′,7-dihydroxy-3′,5′-dimethoxyflavylium
- Systematic IUPAC name 7-Hydroxy-2-(4-hydroxy-3,5-dimethoxyphenyl)-3,5-bis{[(2S,3R,4S,5S,6R)-3,4,5-trihydroxy-6-(hydroxymethyl)oxan-2-yl]oxy}-1λ^{4}-benzopyran-1-ylium
- Other names Malvidin 3,5-diglucoside

Identifiers
CAS Number	16727-30-3
3D model (JSmol)	(cation): Interactive image; (chloride): Interactive image
ChEBI	CHEBI:75030
ChemSpider	390365 (cation); 16498815 (chloride)
ECHA InfoCard	100.037.063
KEGG	C08718
PubChem CID	441765
UNII	I9I120531L
CompTox Dashboard (EPA)	DTXSID201341471 DTXSID80895052, DTXSID201341471
- InChI: (cation): InChI=1S/C29H34O17/c1-40-15-3-10(4-16(41-2)20(15)33)27-17(44-29-26(39)24(37)22(35)19(9-31)46-29)7-12-13(42-27)5-11(32)6-14(12)43-28-25(38)23(36)21(34)18(8-30)45-28/h3-7,18-19,21-26,28-31,34-39H,8-9H2,1-2H3,(H-,32,33)/p+1/t18-,19-,21-,22-,23+,24+,25-,26-,28-,29-/m1/s1 Key: CILLXFBAACIQNS-BTXJZROQSA-O; (chloride): InChI=1S/C29H34O17.ClH/c1-40-15-3-10(4-16(41-2)20(15)33)27-17(44-29-26(39)24(37)22(35)19(9-31)46-29)7-12-13(42-27)5-11(32)6-14(12)43-28-25(38)23(36)21(34)18(8-30)45-28;/h3-7,18-19,21-26,28-31,34-39H,8-9H2,1-2H3,(H-,32,33);1H/t18-,19-,21-,22-,23+,24+,25-,26-,28-,29-;/m1./s1 Key: RHKJIVJBQJXLBY-FTIBDFQESA-N
- SMILES: (cation): COC1=CC(=CC(=C1O)OC)C2=C(C=C3C(=CC(=CC3=[O+]2)O)O[C@H]4[C@@H]([C@H]([C@@H]([C@H](O4)CO)O)O)O)O[C@H]5[C@@H]([C@H]([C@@H]([C@H](O5)CO)O)O)O; (chloride): [Cl-].O[C@@H]5[C@@H](O)[C@H](O)[C@@H](CO)O[C@H]5Oc2cc(O)cc3[o+]c(c(O[C@@H]1O[C@H](CO)[C@@H](O)[C@H](O)[C@H]1O)cc23)c4cc(OC)c(O)c(OC)c4

Properties
Chemical formula	C_{29}H_{35}O_{17}^{+} (cation); C_{29}H_{35}O_{17}Cl (chloride)
Molar mass	655.578 mg/L (cation); 691.031 mg/L (chloride)
Appearance	Reddish blue, odorless powder
Solubility in water	Nearly insoluble
- Except where otherwise noted, data are given for materials in their standard state (at 25 °C [77 °F], 100 kPa). verify (what is ?) Infobox references

Malvin is a naturally occurring chemical of the anthocyanin family.

Malvin reacts in the presence of H_{2}O_{2} to form malvone. The ortho-benzoyloxyphenylacetic acid esters reaction product is dependant of the pH: it is obtained under acidic conditions whereas under neutral conditions, the reaction product is the 3-O-acyl-glucosyl-5-O-glucosyl-7-hydroxy coumarin.

== Natural occurrences ==
It is a diglucoside of malvidin mainly found as a pigment in herbs like Malva (Malva sylvestris), Primula and Rhododendron. M. sylvestris also contains malonylmalvin (malvidin 3-(6″-malonylglucoside)-5-glucoside).

The characteristic floral jade coloration of Strongylodon macrobotrys has been shown to be an example of copigmentation, a result of the presence of malvin and saponarin (a flavone glucoside) in the ratio 1:9.

=== Presence in food ===
Malvin can be found in a variety of common foods, including peaches (Clingstone variety).
