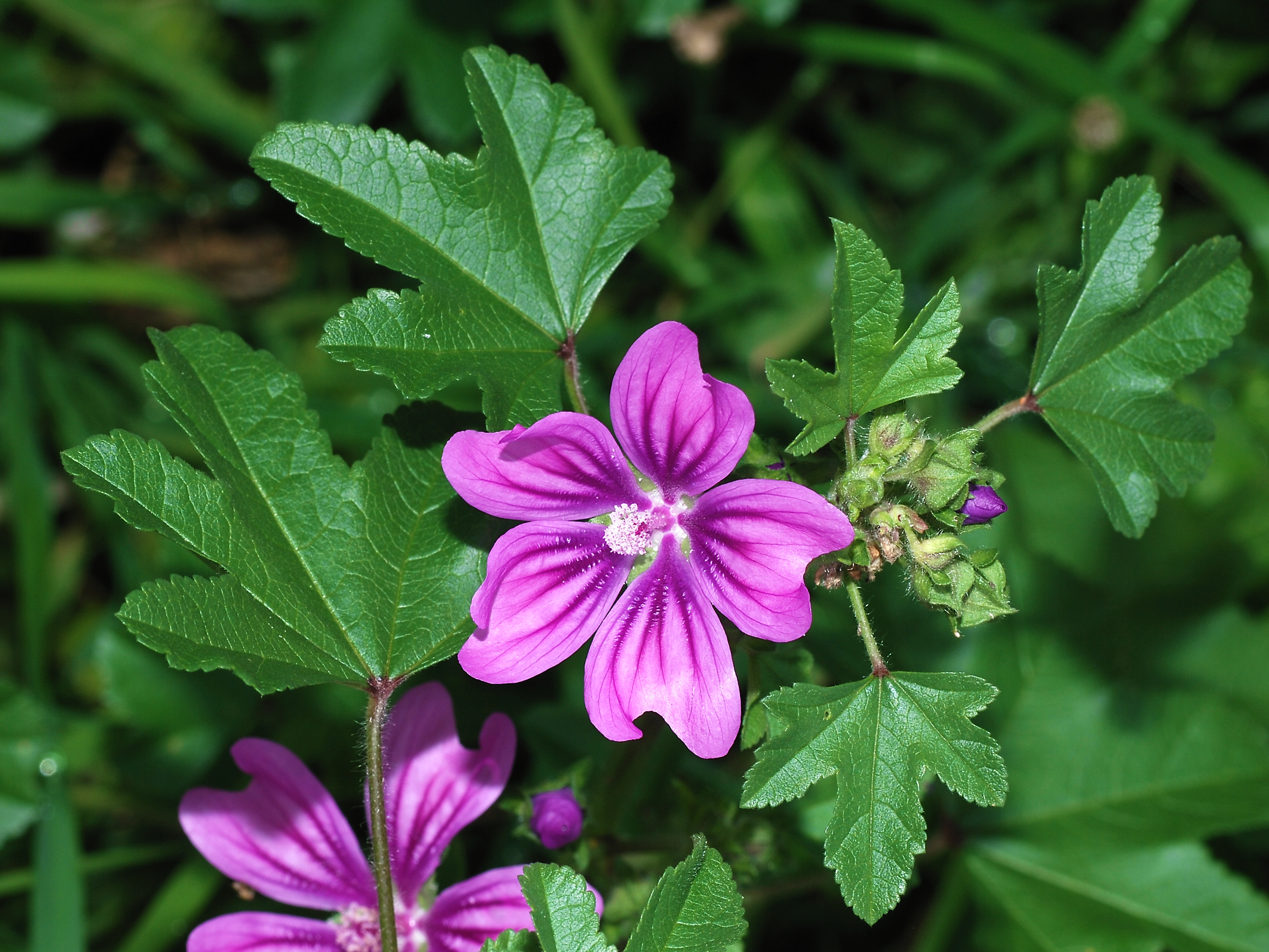
- Type species for Malva L.

Scientific classification
- Kingdom: Plantae
- Clade: Tracheophytes
- Clade: Angiosperms
- Clade: Eudicots
- Clade: Rosids
- Order: Malvales
- Family: Malvaceae
- Genus: Malva
- Species: M. sylvestris

Binomial name
- Malva sylvestris L.

Varieties
- M. sylvestris var. oxyloba; M. sylvestris var. sylvestris

Synonyms
- List: Althaea godronii Alef.; Althaea mauritiana Alef.; Althaea vulgaris (Gray) Alef.; Malva acutiloba Sennen; Malva acutiloba K.Koch; Malva albiflora C.Presl; Malva altissima Sennen; Malva ambigua Guss.; Malva aragonensis Sennen; Malva ciliata Wall.; Malva elata Pomel; Malva elata Salisb.; Malva equina Wallr.; Malva erecta C.Presl; Malva erevaniana Takht.; Malva glabra Desr.; Malva grossheimii Iljin; Malva gymnocarpa Pomel; Malva hirsuta Viv.; Malva longilobata Sennen; Malva lucida Lindl.; Malva major Garsault; Malva martrinii Rouy; Malva mauritanica Spreng.; Malva mauritiana L.; Malva obtusa Moench; Malva orientalis Mill.; Malva plebeia Steven; Malva polymorpha Guss.; Malva pumila Retz.; Malva racemosa C.Presl; Malva recta Opiz; Malva rotundifolia Cav.; Malva ruderalis Salisb.; Malva tetuanensis Pau; Malva tomentella C.Presl; Malva vivianiana Rouy; Malva vulgaris Gray; Malva zebrina Anon.

= Malva sylvestris =

Plant species in the mallow family

Malva sylvestris is a species of the mallow genus Malva, of which it the type species. Known as common mallow to English-speaking Europeans, it acquired the common names of cheeses, high mallow and tall mallow (mauve des bois by the French) as it migrated from its native home in Western Europe, North Africa and Asia through the English-speaking world.

M. sylvestris is a vigorous plant with showy flowers of bright mauve-purple, with dark veins, standing 0.91–1.22 metres (3–4 ft) high and growing freely in meadows, hedgerows and in fallow fields.

== Common names ==
It is one of several species of different genera sometimes referred to as Creeping Charlie, a term more commonly applied to Glechoma hederacea (ground ivy).

== Description ==
Common mallow is a herbaceous perennial with an erect or decumbent branched stem up to 1.5 metres (5 ft) tall. The minutely ridged stems are covered with fine soft hairs, sometimes with a slightly bulbous base. The leaves are alternate, with a petiole up to 20 centimetres (8 in) long, simple but palmate, up to 7 cm long by 10 cm wide, with stellate hairs (i.e. several strands radiating from a common center) and prominent veins on the underside.

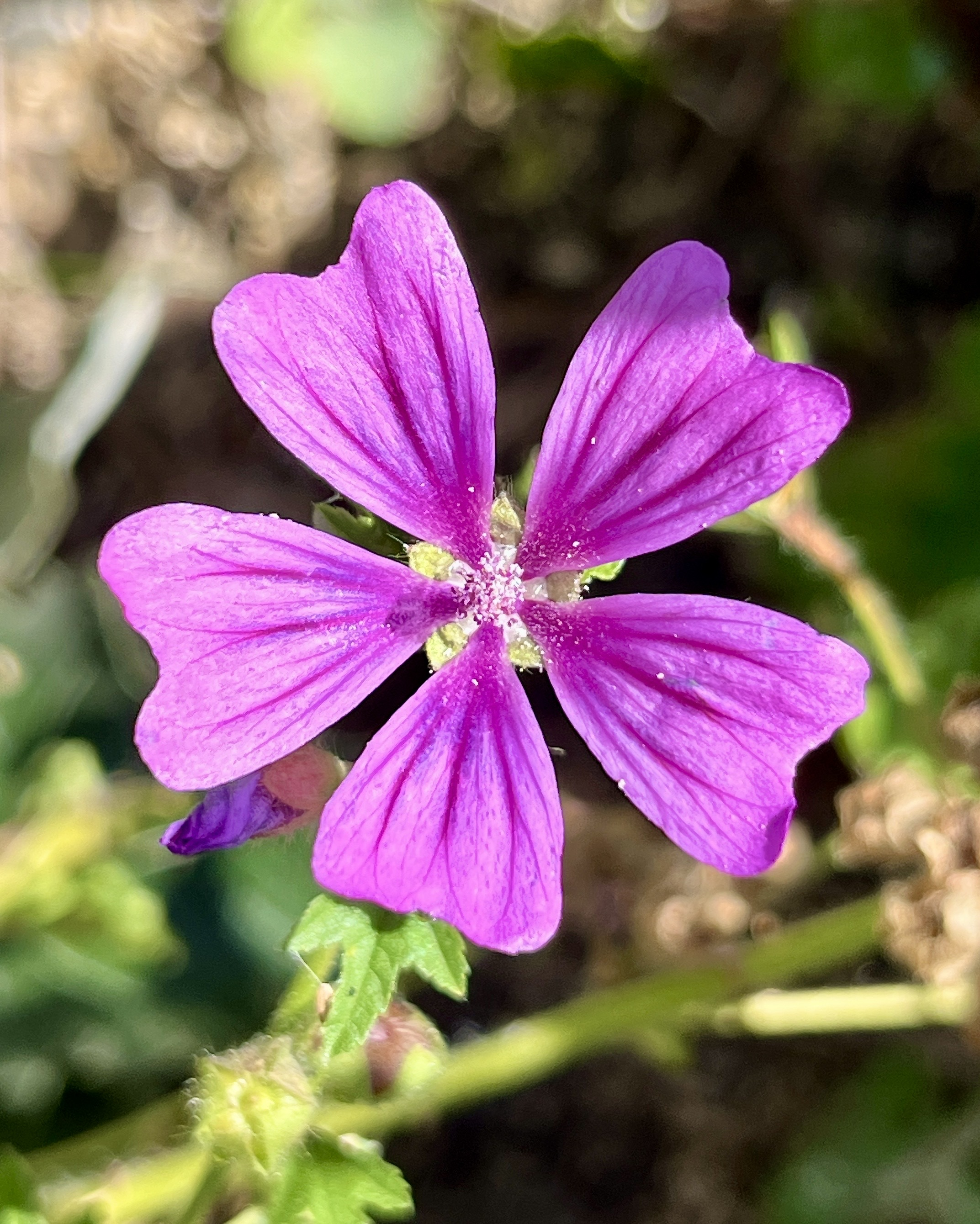
Flower

The flowers are reddish-purple with dark stripes and occur in axillary clusters of 2 to 4 along the main stem with the flowers at the base opening first. There are 5 petals, each being up to 2 cm (3/4 in) long, and 5 sepals, 3–6 mm long, which are fused in the lower half, and have broadly triangular lobes. There is also an epicalyx (or false calyx) with oblong segments, two-thirds as long as calyx lobes (2–3 mm long x 1.5 mm wide).

=== Fruits ===
Nutlets strongly reticulate (10–12 mericarps, usually without hair, with sharp angle between dorsal and lateral surfaces, 5–6 mm in diameter.

=== Seeds ===
Also called 'cheeses', the seeds are brown to brownish green when ripe, about 2.5 mm long and wide.

=== Chemistry ===
M. sylvestris contains malvin and malonylmalvin. It also contains the naphthoquinone malvone A, which is also a phytoalexin.

== Subspecies ==
Plants previously often described as Malva sylvestris var. malaca are now considered a cultivar group Malva sylvestris Mauritiana group.

== Distribution and habitat ==
Malva sylvestris spreads itself on waste and rough ground, by roads and railways throughout lowland England, Wales and Channel Islands, Siberia and scattered elsewhere. One of the major areas that it grows in is northeast and central Iran. It is also found in North Africa and grows as a biennial in the Mediterranean; it grows as a perennial elsewhere. It has been introduced to and has become naturalised in eastern Australia, in the United States, Canada, and Mexico as an invasive species.

=== In the wild ===
Palearctic:

Macaronesia: Azores, Madeira Islands
Northern Africa: Algeria, Egypt, Libya, Morocco
Arabian Peninsula: Saudi Arabia
Western Asia: Afghanistan, Sinai, Iran, Israel, Palestine, Jordan, Lebanon, Syria, Turkey
Caucasus: Armenia, Azerbaijan, Ciscaucasia, Dagestan, Georgia
Soviet Middle Asia: Kyrgyzstan, Tajikistan, Turkmenistan, Uzbekistan
Mongolia: Mongolia
China: Xinjiang
Indian Subcontinent: Bhutan, India, Pakistan
Northern Europe: Denmark, Finland, Ireland, Norway, Sweden, United Kingdom
Middle Europe: Austria, Belgium, Czech Republic, Germany, Hungary, Netherlands, Poland, Slovakia, Switzerland
East Europe: Belarus, Central Russia, Central Black Earth, Estonia, Latvia, Lithuania, Moldova, Northern Russia, North Caucasus, Northwestern Russia, Volga, Urals, Volga-Vyatka, Ukraine
Southeastern Europe: Albania, Bosnia and Herzegovina, Bulgaria, Croatia, Greece, Italy, Macedonia, Montenegro, Sardinia, Serbia, Sicily, Slovenia, Romania, Cyprus
Southwestern Europe: Balearic Islands, Corsica, France, Portugal, Spain

Source: USDA ARS GRIN

== Cultivation ==
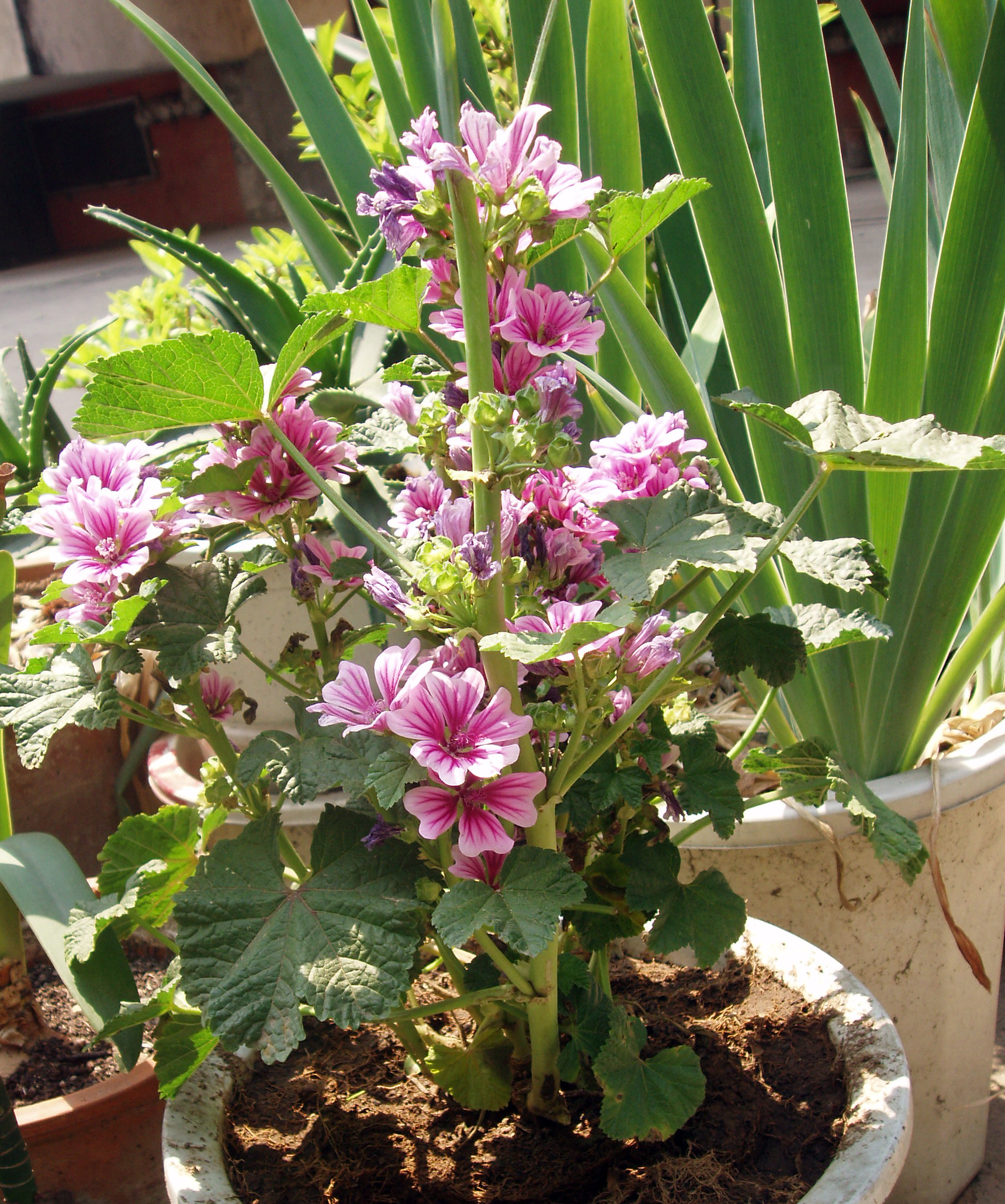
The cultivar 'Zebrina', selected for its striped petals

It is often grown as an ornamental plant for its attractive flowers, produced for a long period through the summer. Numerous cultivars have been selected and named.

Cultivars of Malva sylvestris include: 'Annita', 'Aurora', 'Bardsey Blue', 'Blue Fountain', 'Brave Heart', 'Cottenham Blue', 'Gibbortello', 'Harry Hay', 'Highnam', 'Inky Stripe', 'Knockout', 'Magic Hollyhock', 'Mest', 'Mystic Merlin', 'Perry's Blue', 'Purple Satin', 'Richard Perry', 'Tournai', 'Windsor Castle', 'Zebrina' (soft lavender-purple striped with deep maroon veins) and 'Zebrina Zebra Magis'.

=== Cultivar groups ===
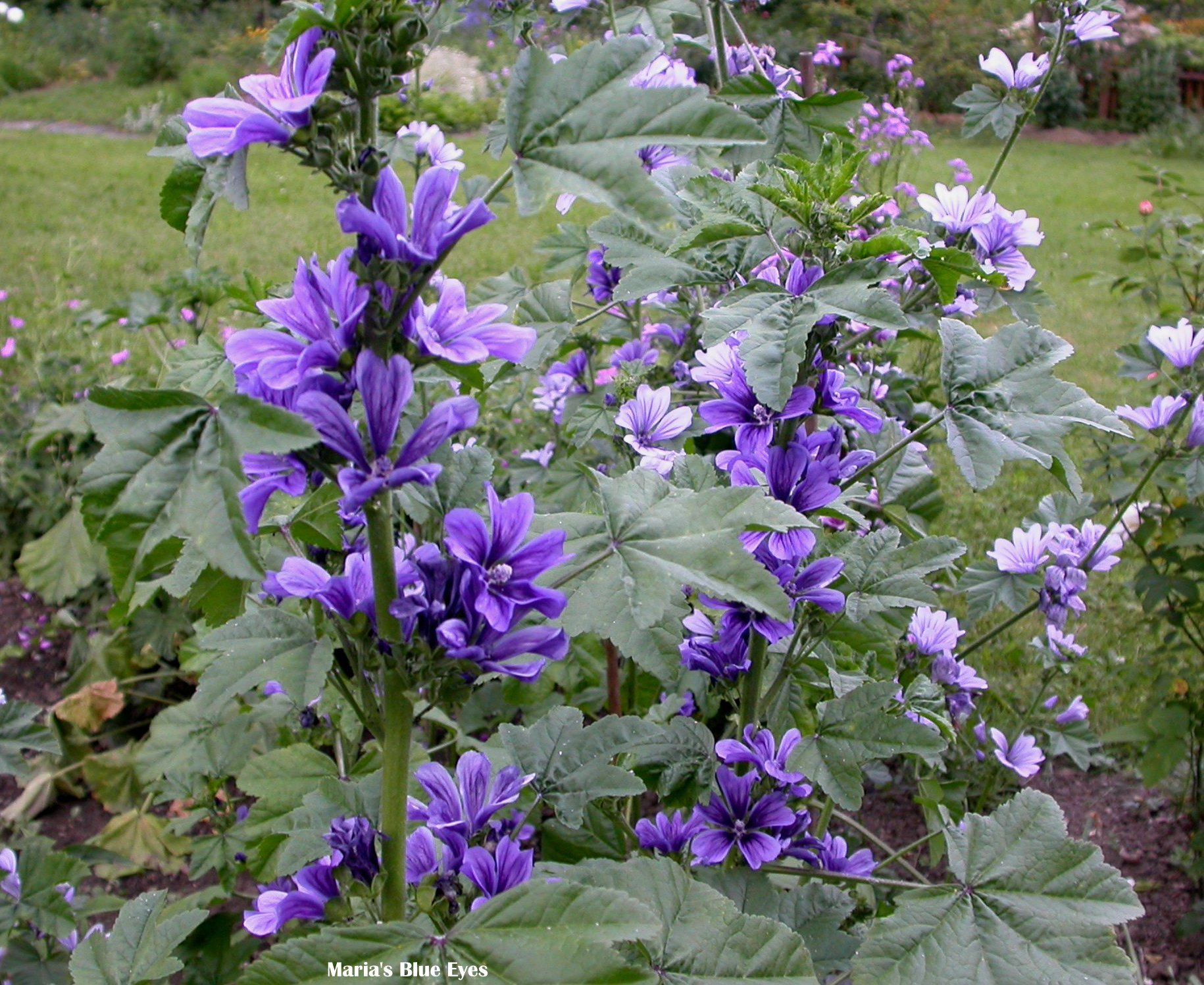
The cultivar 'Maria's Blue Eyes'

- Malva sylvestris L. Mauritiana group: Swedish: mauretansk rödmalva, Estonian: mauri kassinaeris, Slovene: Mavretanski slezenovec, Hungarian: mórmályva. Malva mauritiana used to be recognized as a species whose range is Iberia, Italy and Algeria. Garden plants are often called Malva sylvestris var. mauritiana and they make a cultivar group that includes:

'Bibor Felho'
'Moravia'

- Malva sylvestris L. Eriocarpa group: Hairy seeds and hairy stems found between Italy and the Himalayas, Central Asia and China.
- Malva sylvestris L. Canescens group: Every part except for the flower is covered with dense white woolly hair, growing in the Montpellier region of France, and on the Balearic Isles. Some 19th-century botanical works called this group Malva sylvestris L. var. canescens.
- Malva sylvestris L. Sterile Blue group: Vegetatively propagated pale violet-blue flowered cultivars:

Marina 'Dema'
'Primley Blue'
'Maria's Blue Eyes' (dark violet-blue flowered)

=== Virus ===
Malva vein clearing potyvirus which is transmitted by mechanical inoculation in a non-persistent manner via insects, such as Aphis umbrella (syn. Aphis malvae Koch) and Myzus persicae (all are Aphididae). The virus can be found in Tasmania, Brazil, the former Czechoslovakia, Germany, Israel, Italy, Portugal, California, Russia and the former Yugoslavia.

== Uses ==
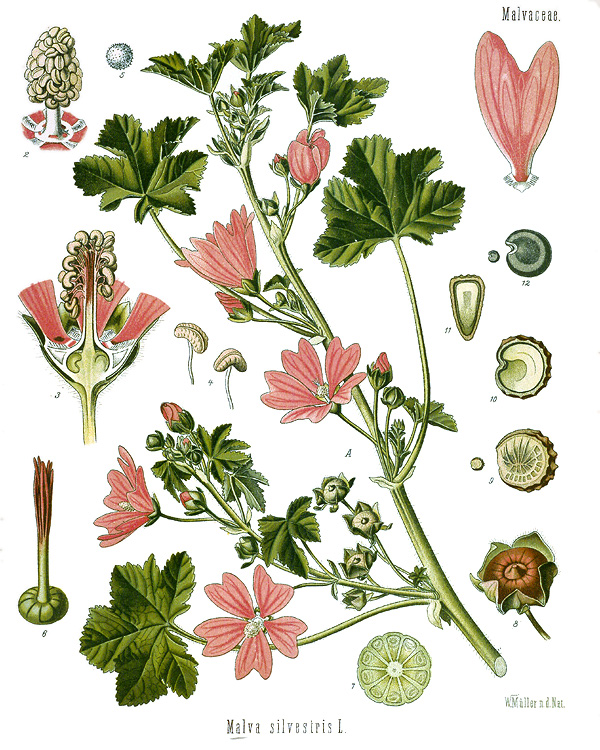
M. sylvestris in a 19th-century illustration

The young leaves and shoots are edible raw or cooked. M. sylvestris has traditionally been used around the world as a wild food plant, from the Mediterranean and Middle East, including Palestine and Italy, to the Caucasus. In Morocco, Tunisia and Palestine, Malva leaves are steamed with garlic and tomatoes, and eaten as an appetizer or salad. In Egypt, the leaves are made into a stew-like vegetable dish, especially in winter, known as khobeiza, which is similar to Molokheia.

Mauve, n. F., mallow, L. malva. So named from the similarity of the color to that of the petals of common mallow, {Malva sylvestris}.

— Webster's Dictionary

In 1931, Maud Grieve wrote that the "use of this species of Mallow has been much superseded by marsh-mallow (Althaea officinalis), which possesses its properties in a superior degree, but it is still a favorite remedy with country people where marsh-mallow is not obtainable." The flowers were spread on doorways and woven into garlands or chaplets for celebrating May Day. The boiled young leaves are a vegetable eaten in several parts of Europe in the 19th century.

In traditional medicine, M. sylvestris has been used in herbalism. Mucilage is present in many of the family Malvaceae including M. sylvestris, especially the fruit. The seeds are used internally in a decoction or herbal tea as a demulcent, and the leaves may be used in poultices as an emollient for external applications.

The species has long been used as a natural yellow dye, and dyes of various yellow-green colors can be obtained from the plant and its seeds. A tincture of the flowers can make a sensitive test for alkalis. M. sylvestris has also been used for veterinary purposes.

== Gallery ==
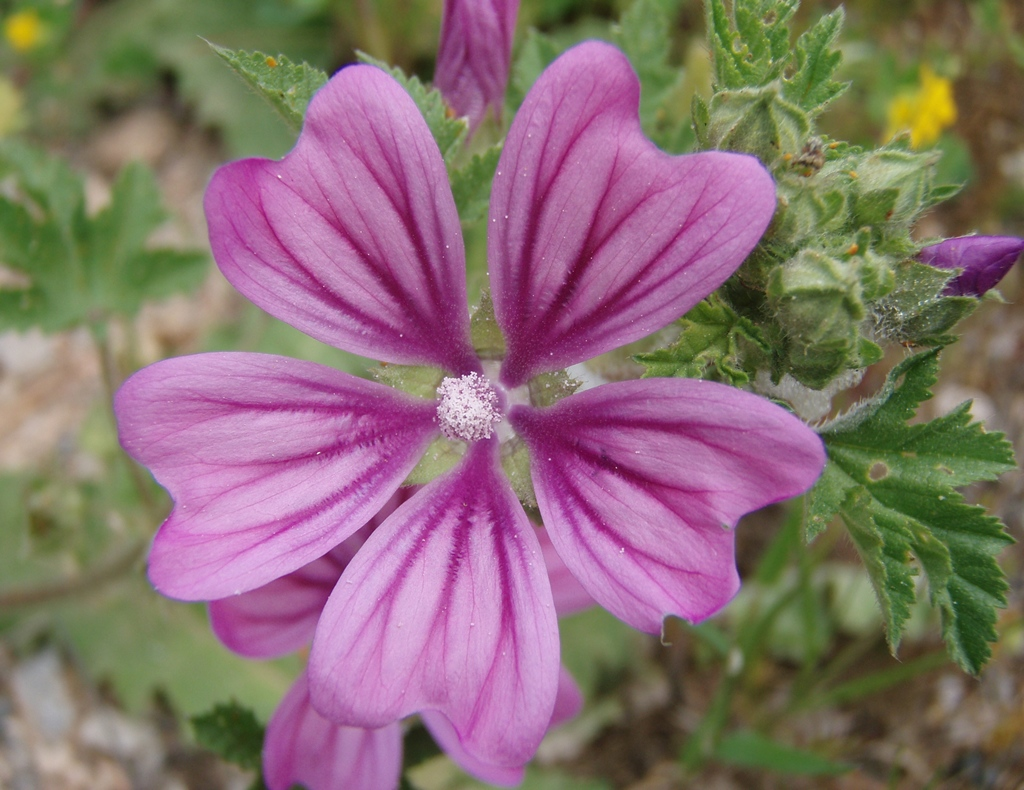
Flower

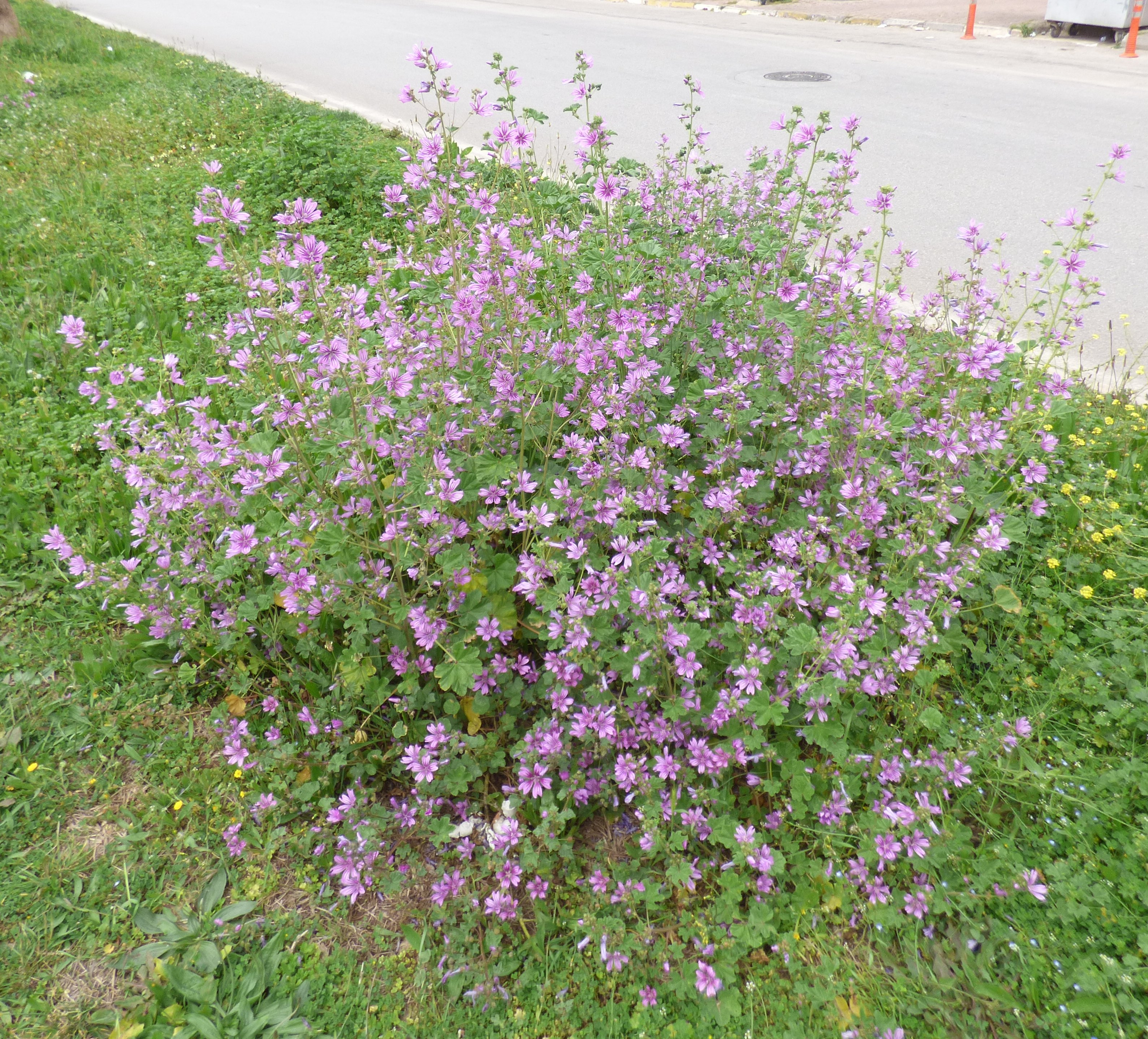
Standard upright, spreading form; flowers large but quite variable

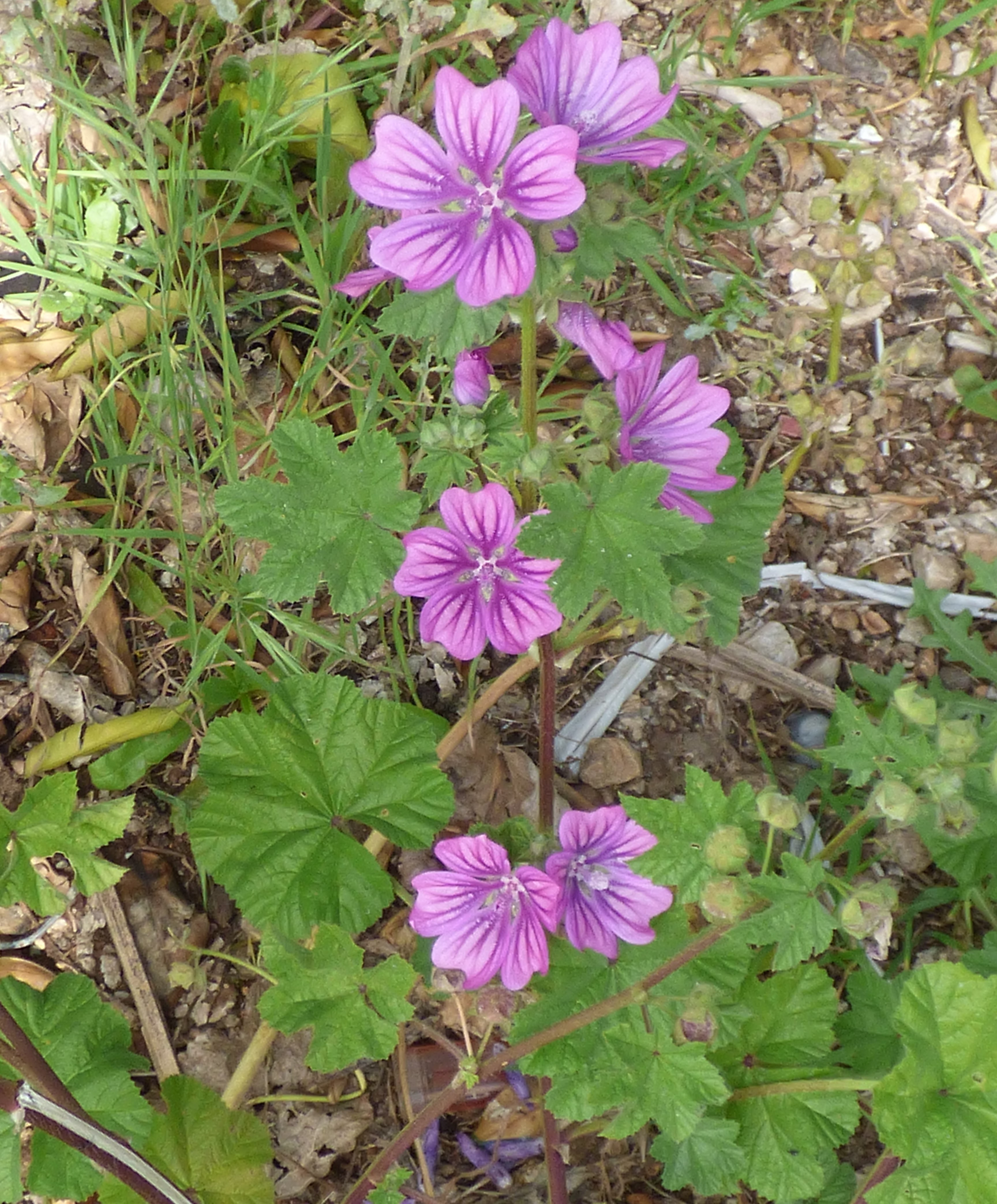
Standard upright form; flowers large

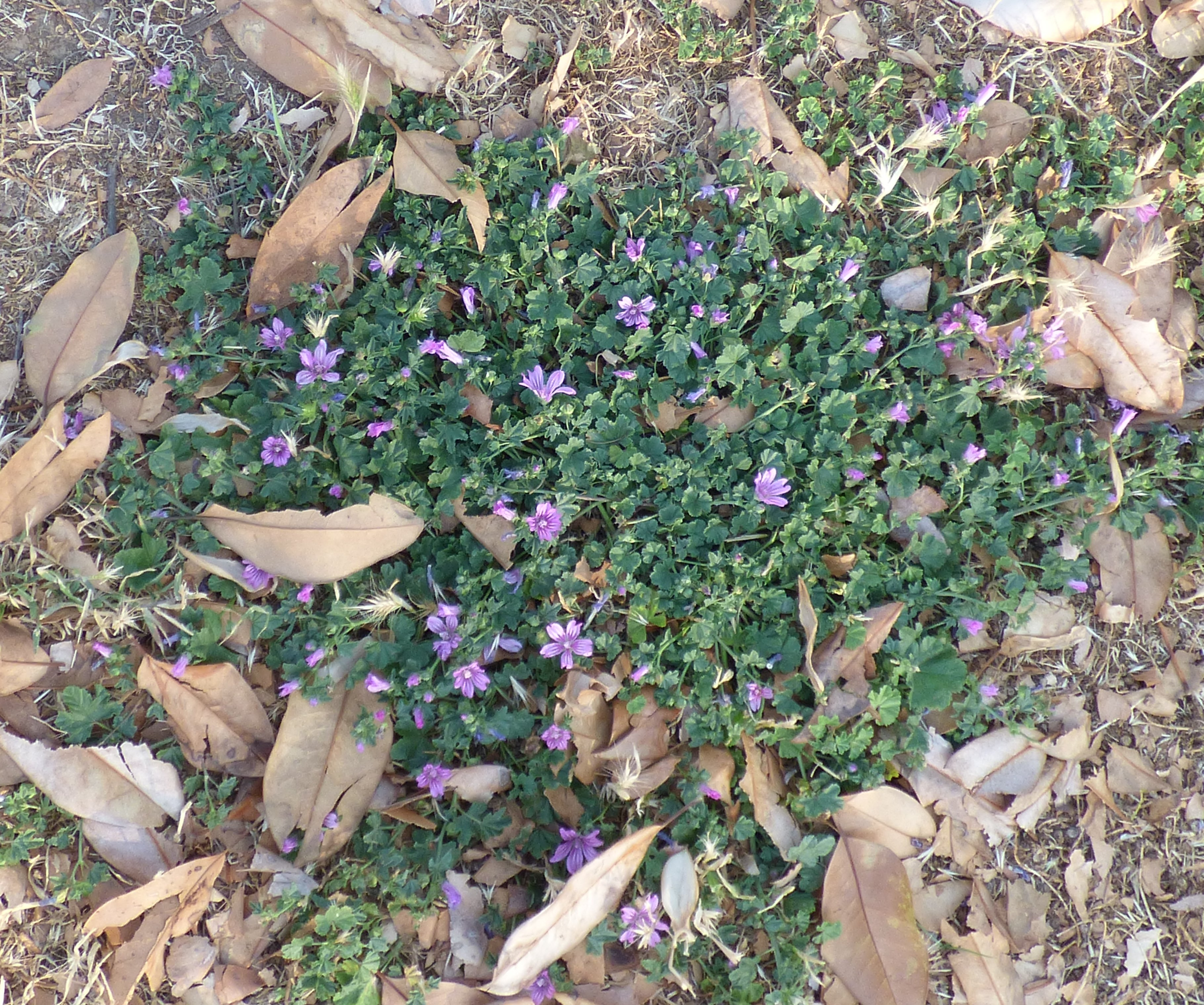
Trampled or mown form, stays close to ground

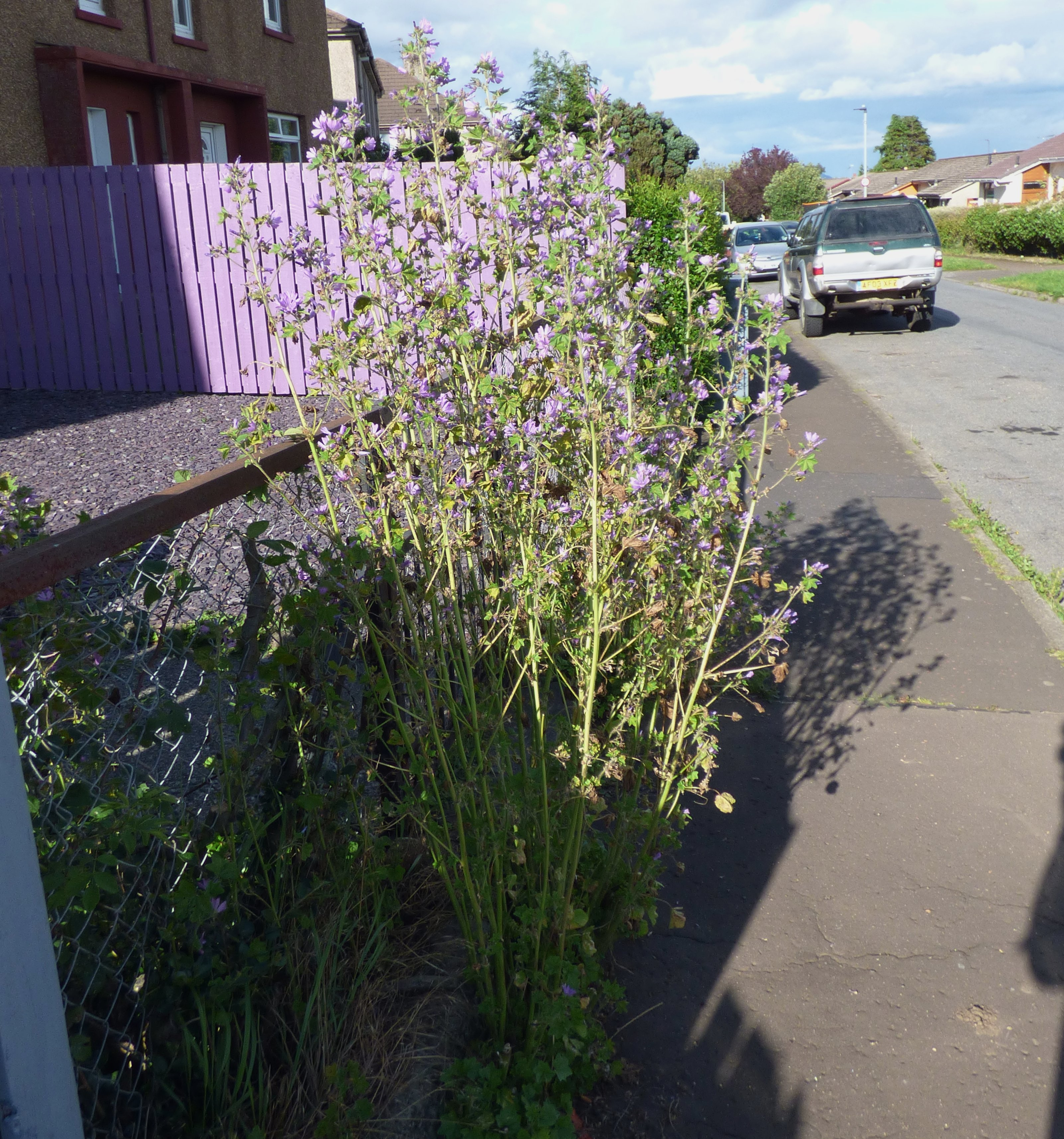
Tall form (cultivated escapee)

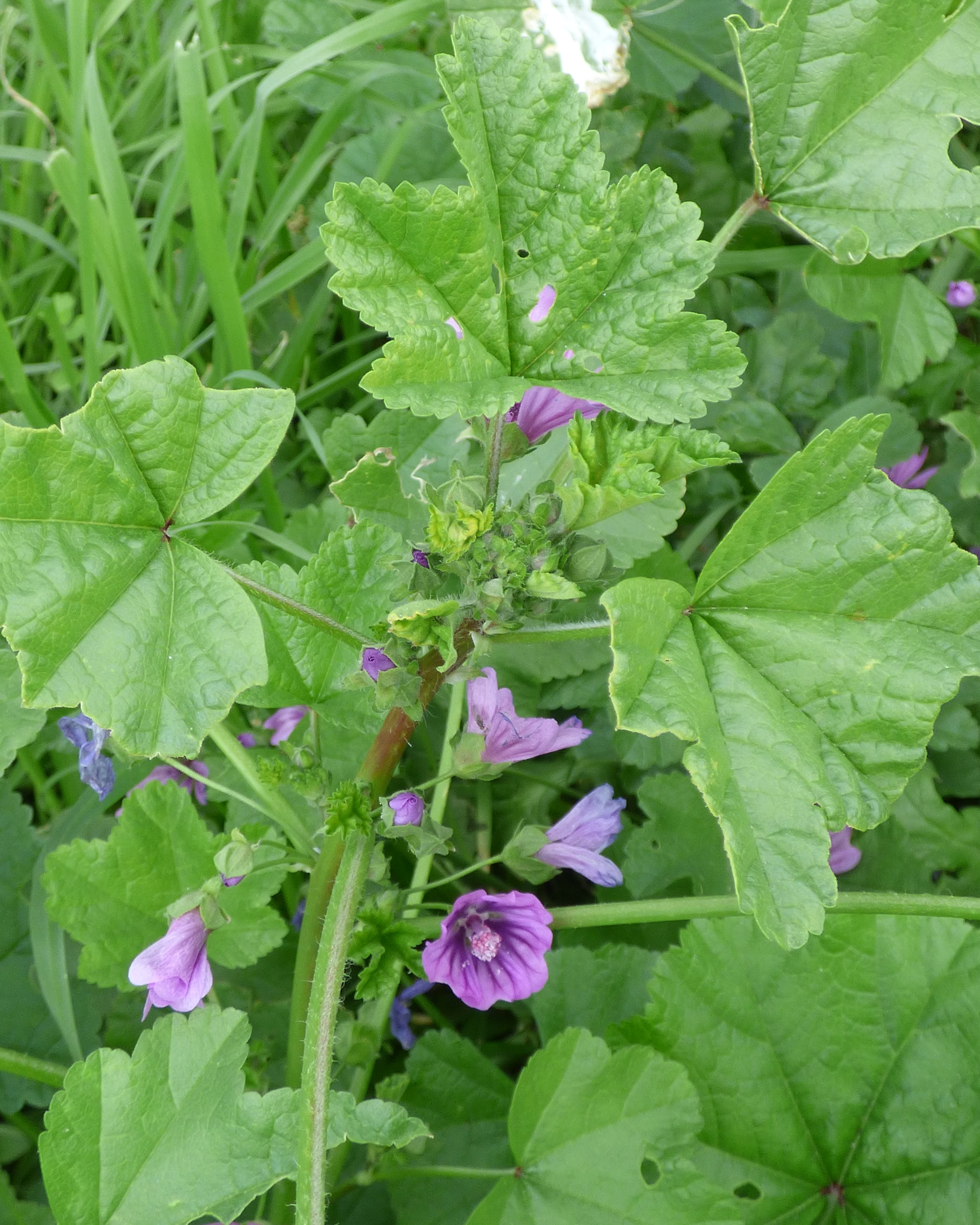
Inflorescence top

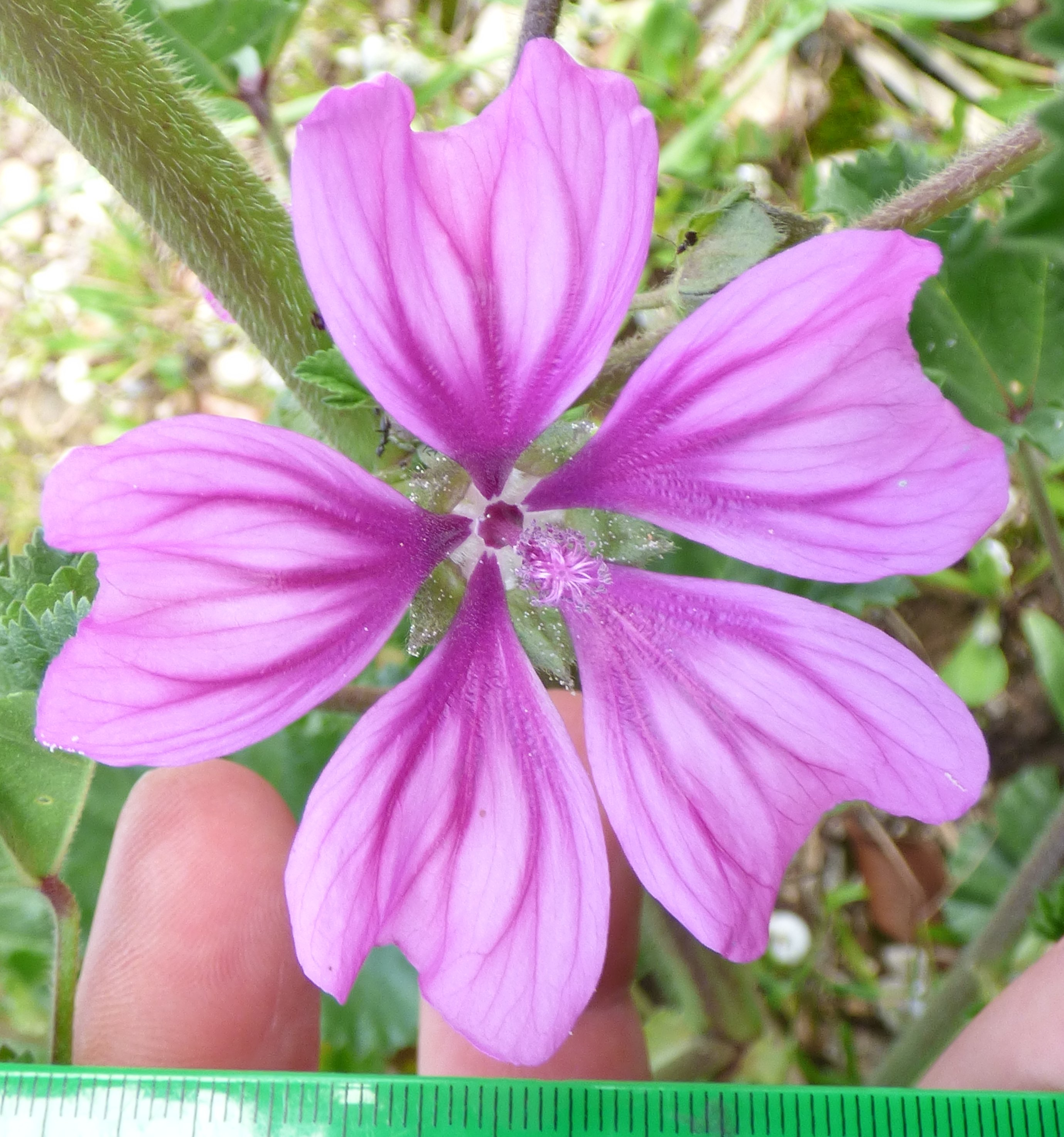
Flowers generally large, bold coloured

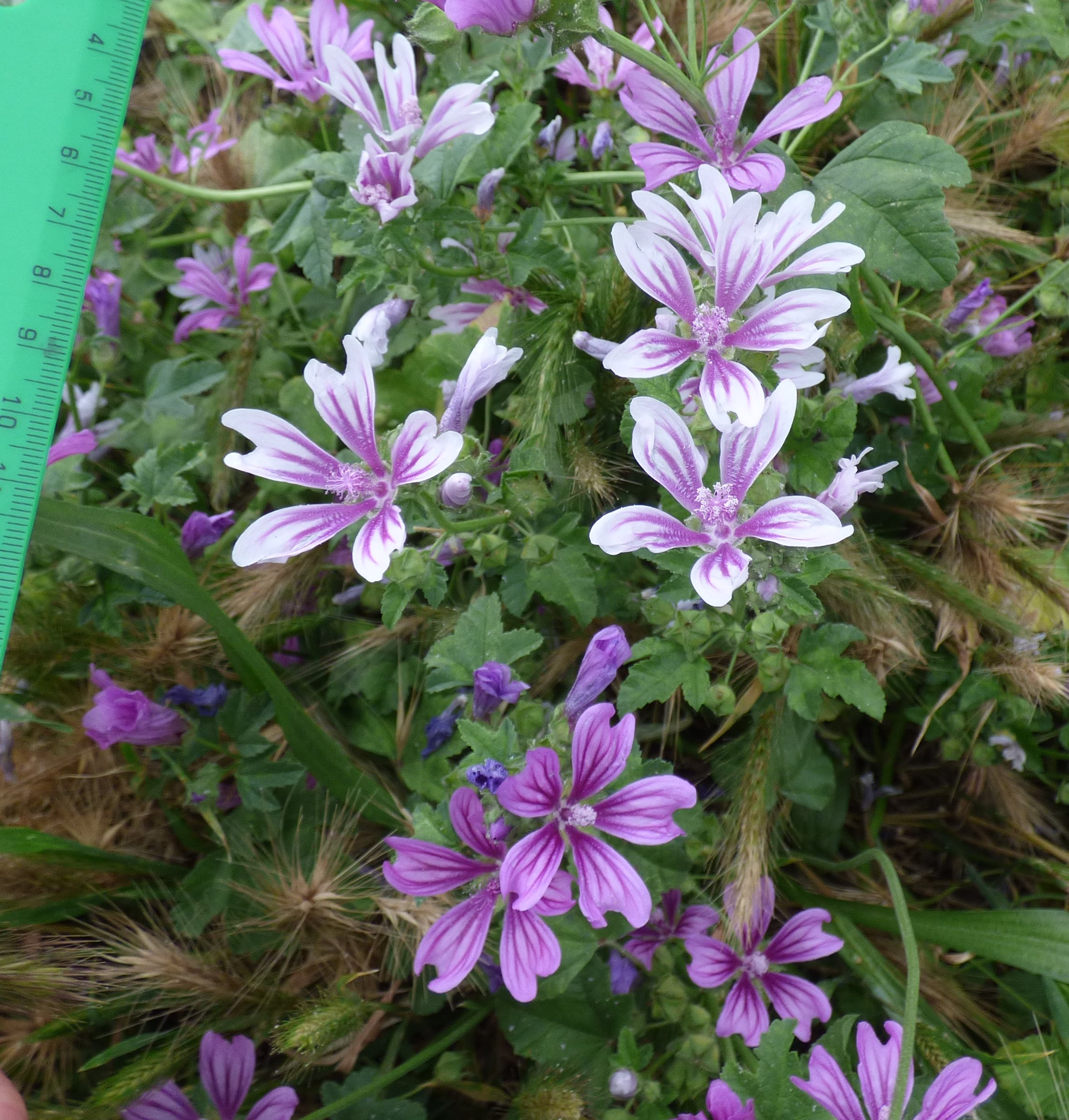
May be lighter coloured

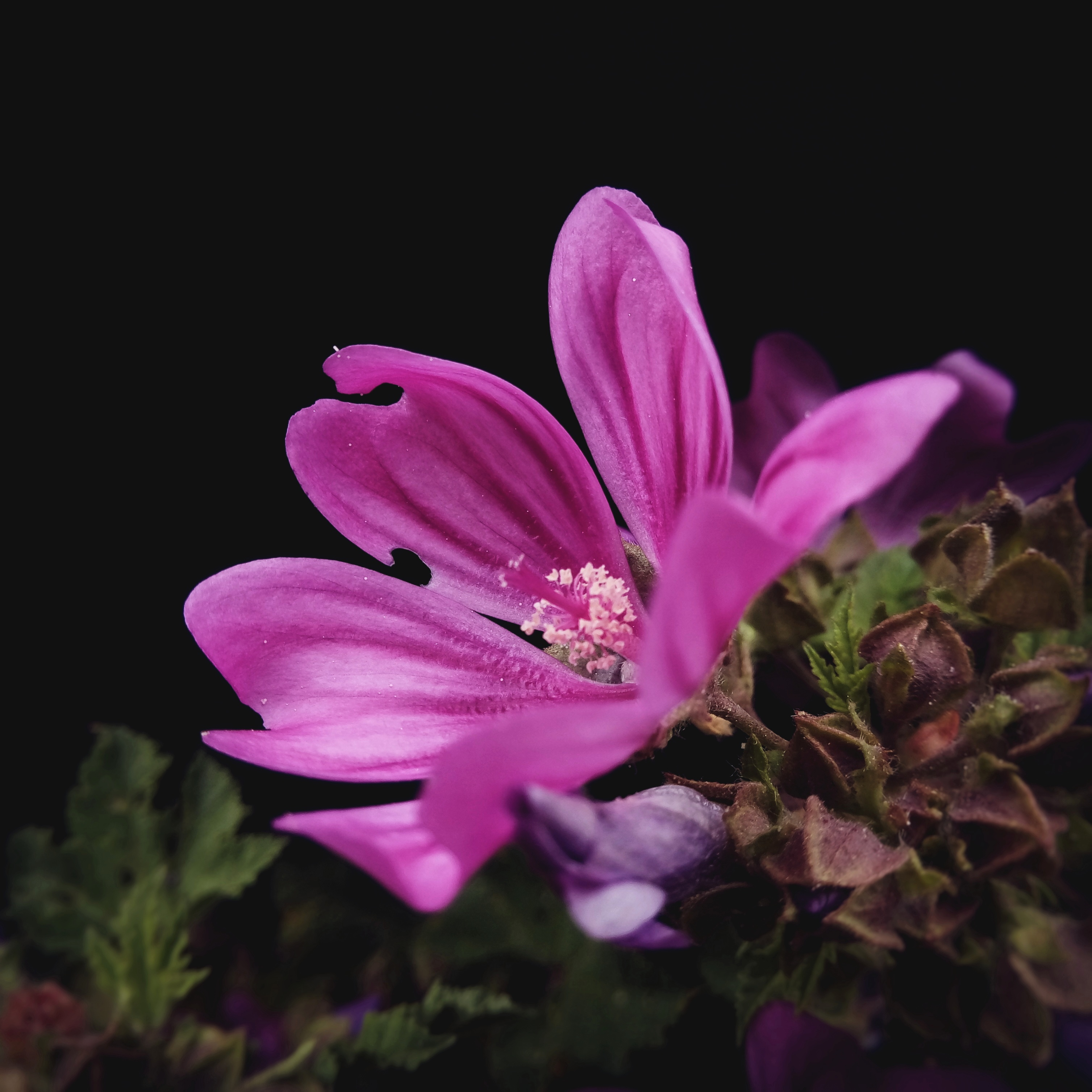
Colour may be rather bold

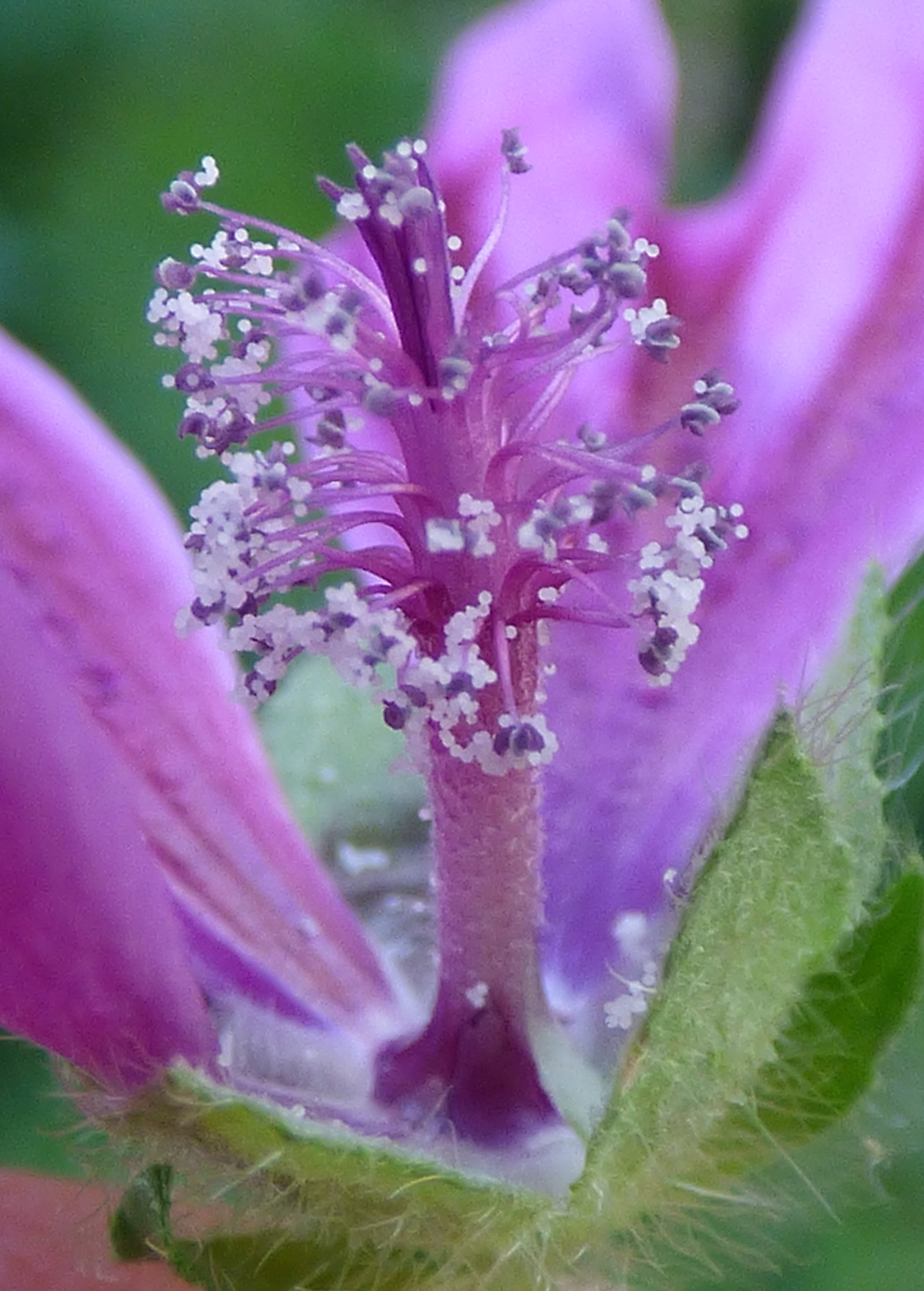
Floral organs

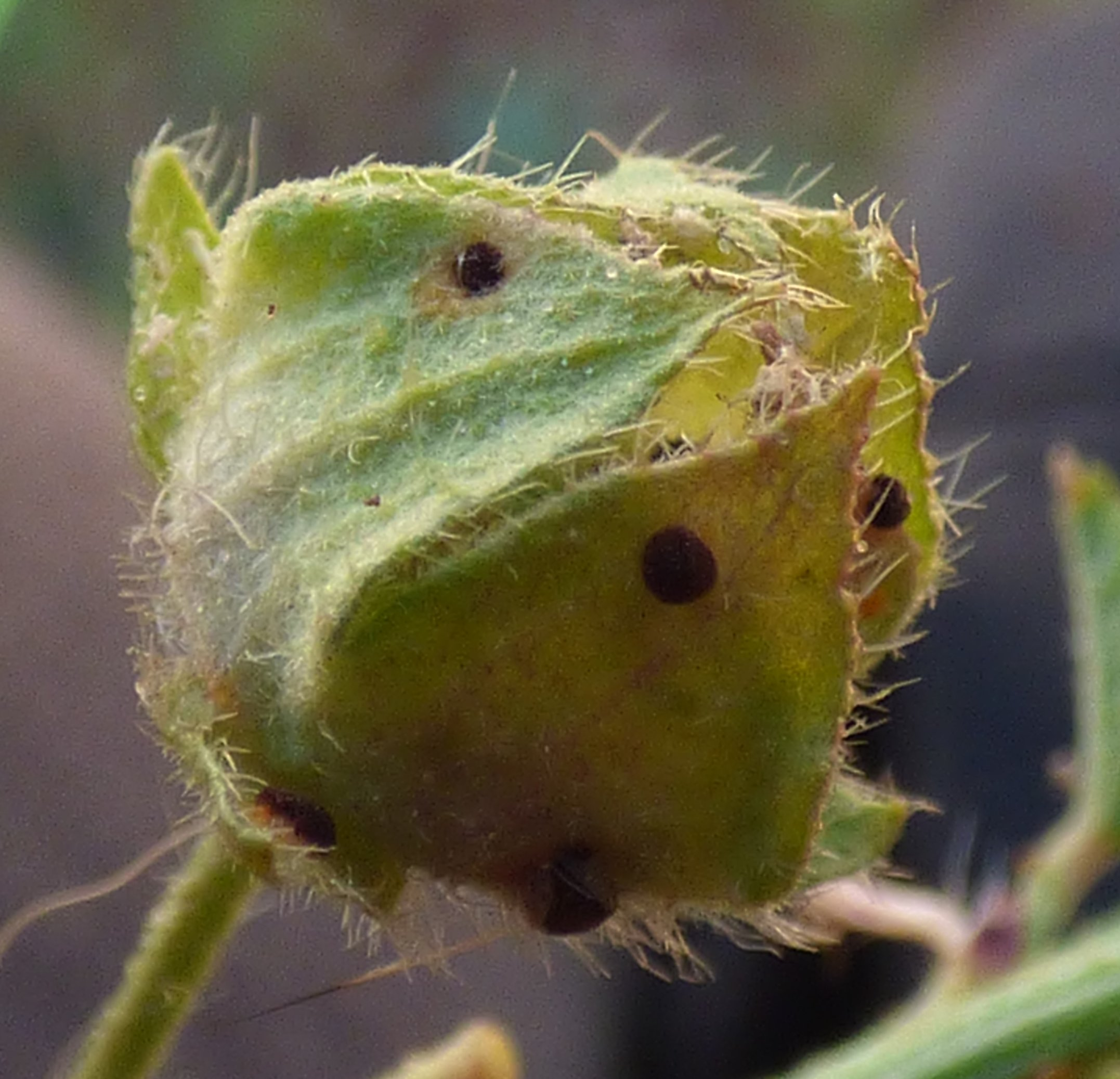
Calyx 5-part, parts broad (narrow epicalyx also showing)

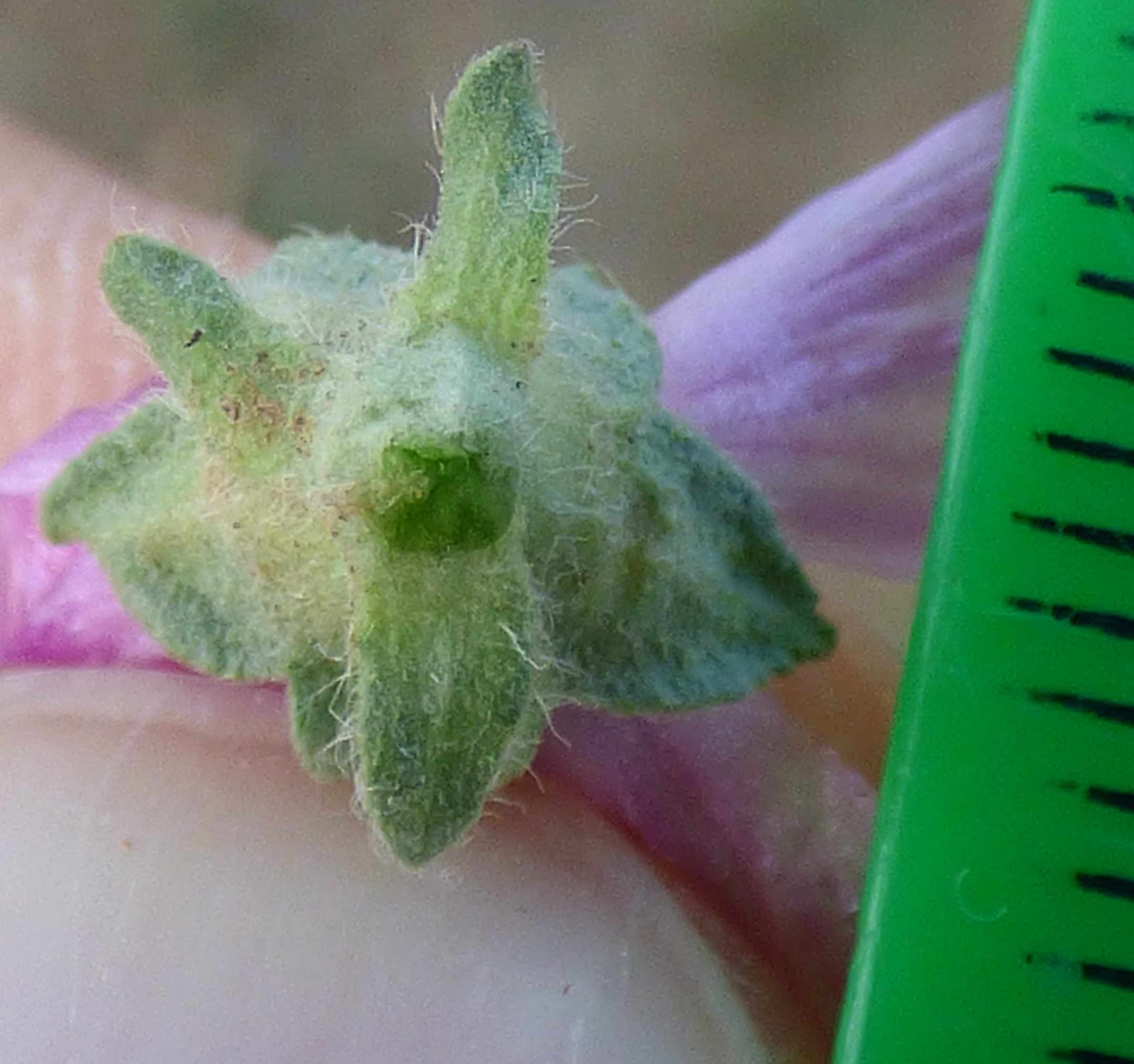
Epicalyx 3-part, parts narrow to moderately broad

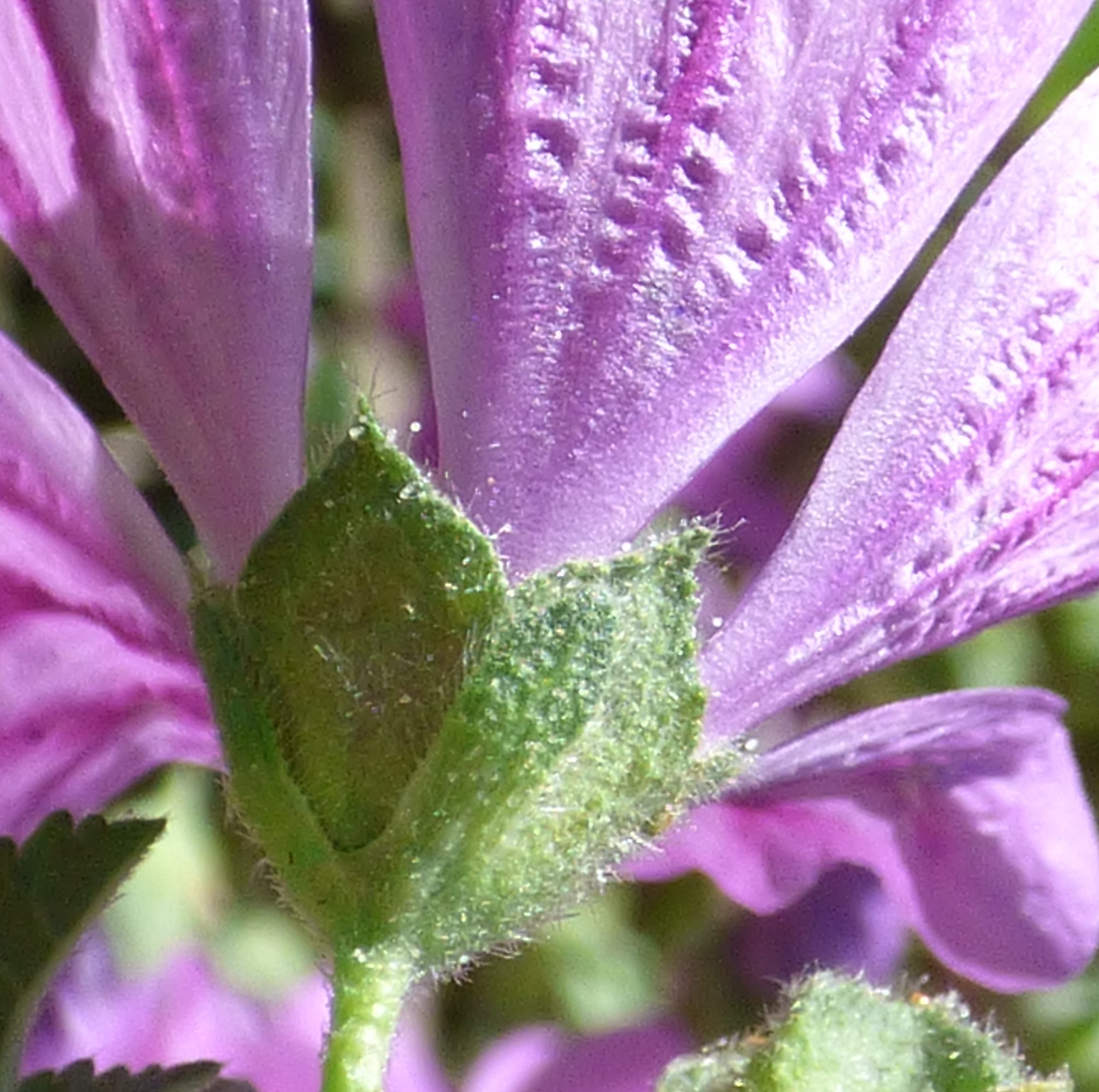
Epicalyx 3-part, parts narrow to moderately broad

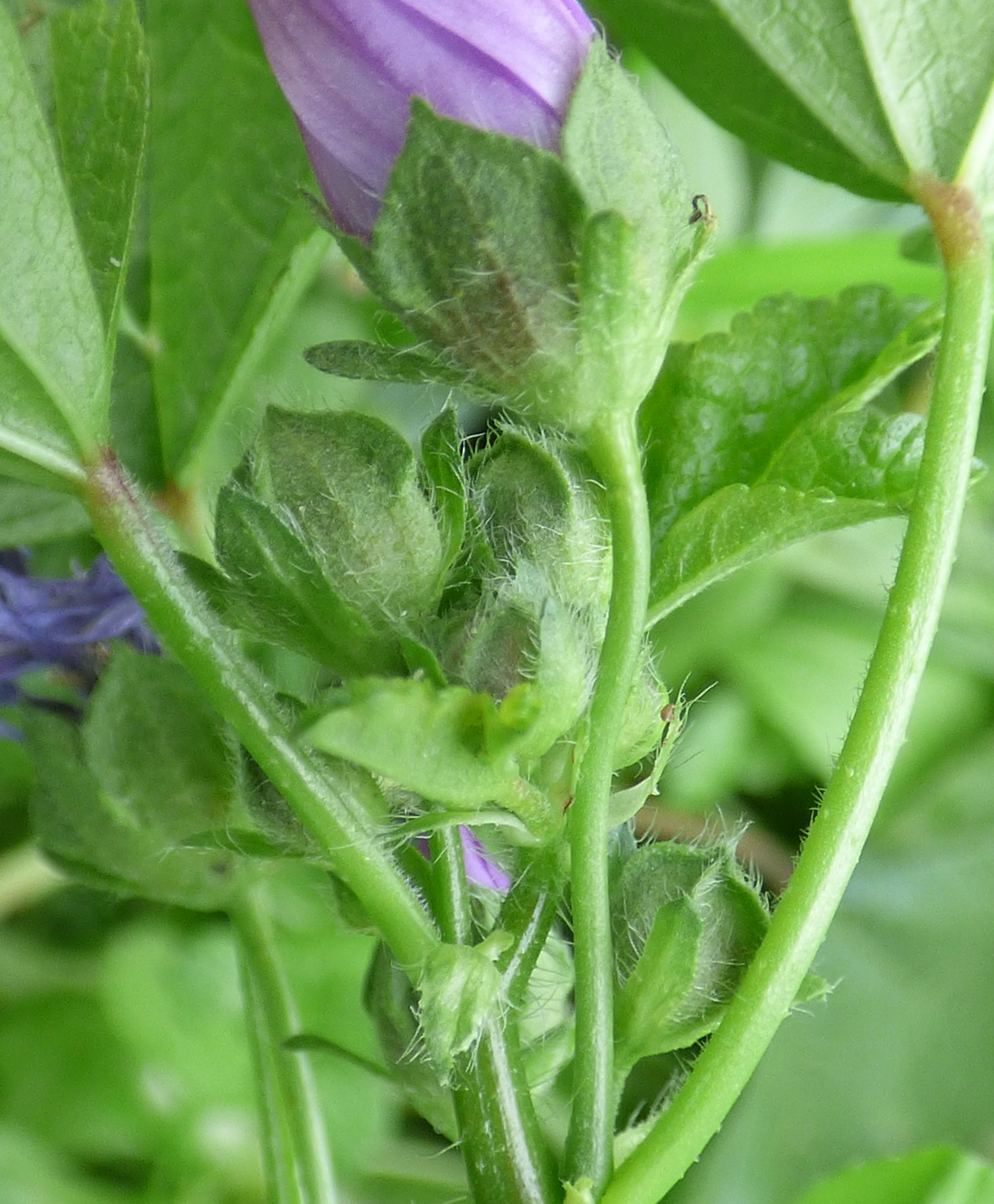
Inflorescence showing features above

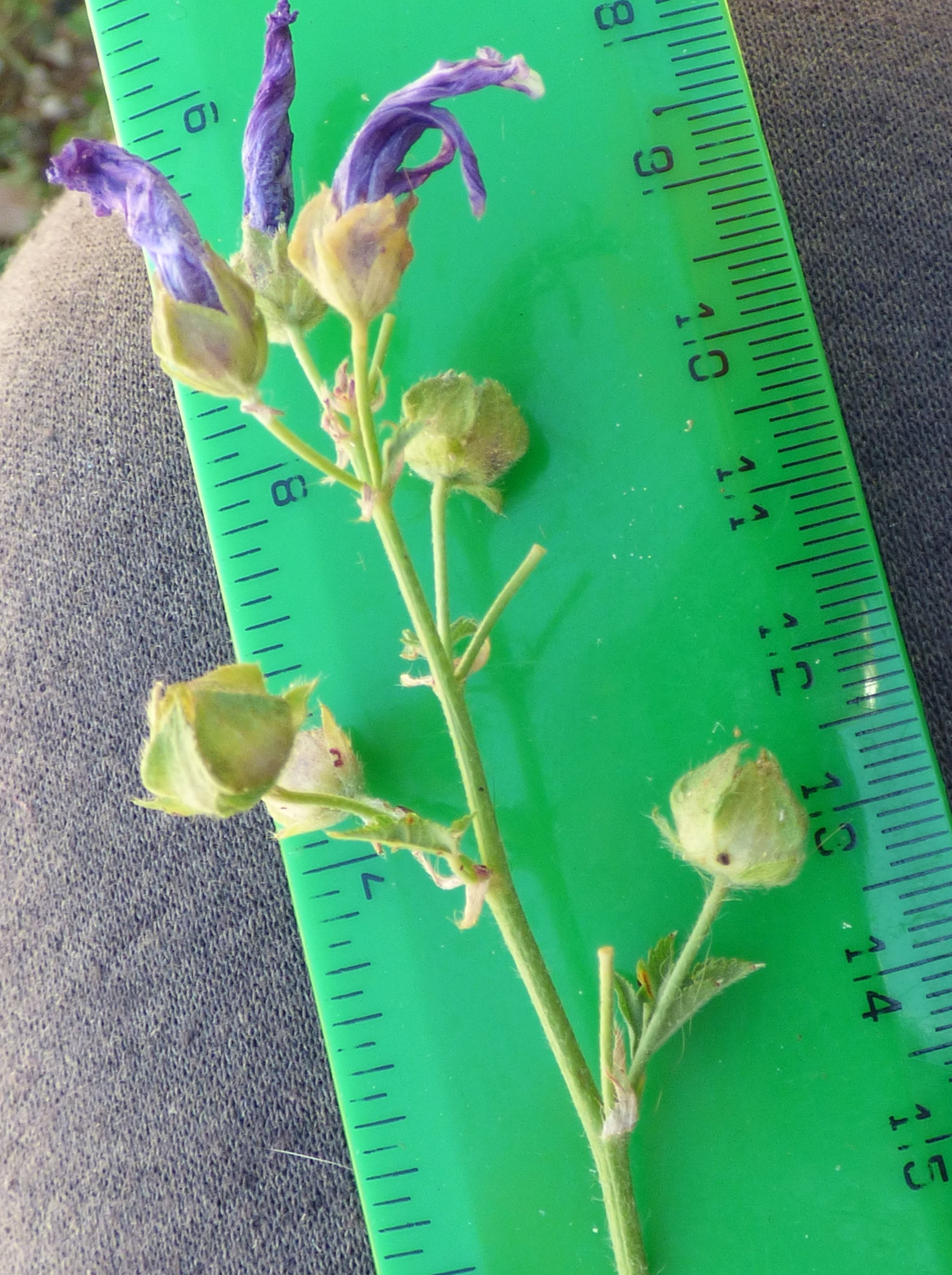
Inflorescence top showing features above

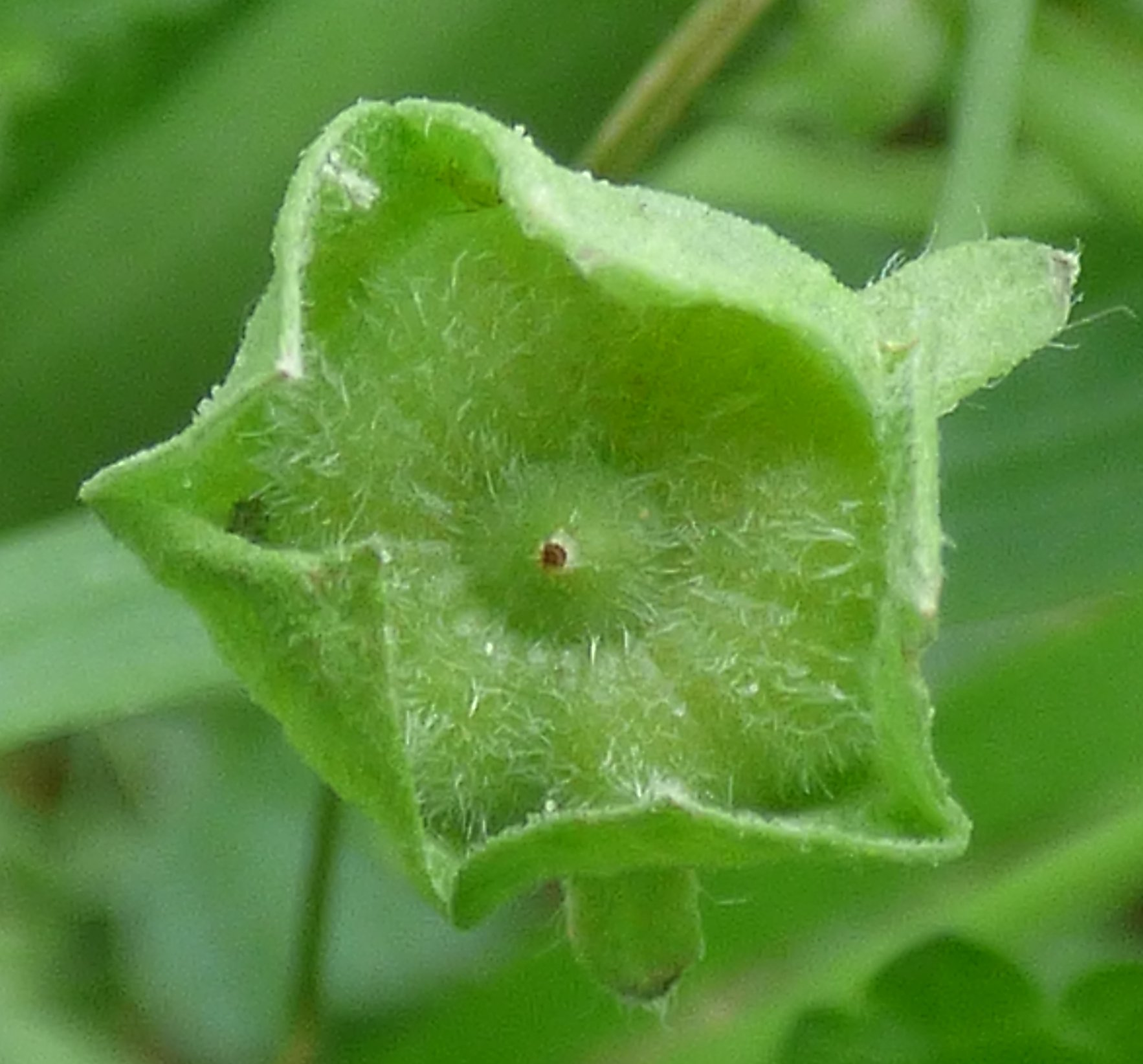
Fruit immature, wrinkles starting to show, hairy form (var. eriocarpa)

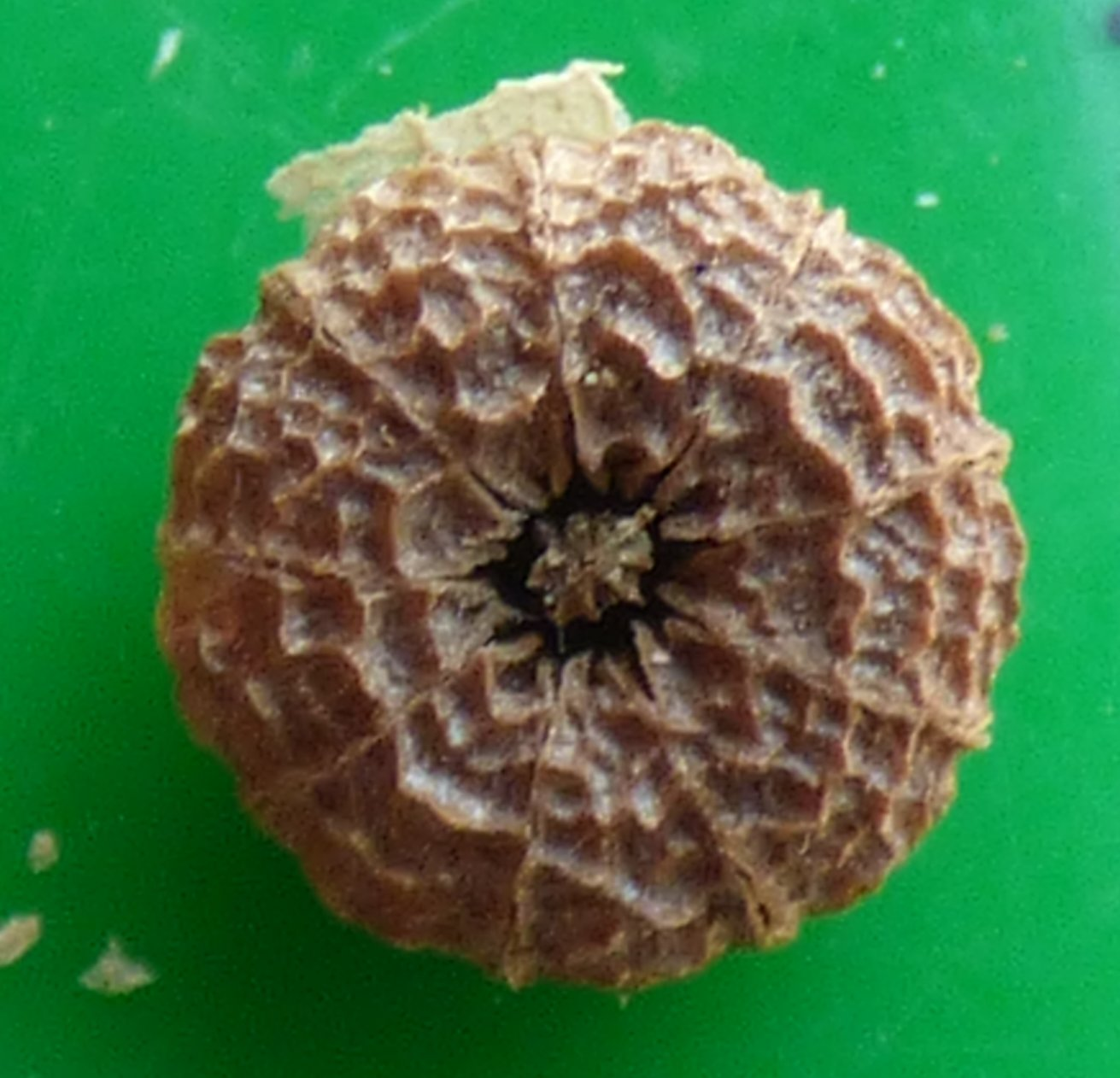
Fruit wrinkled, hairless form

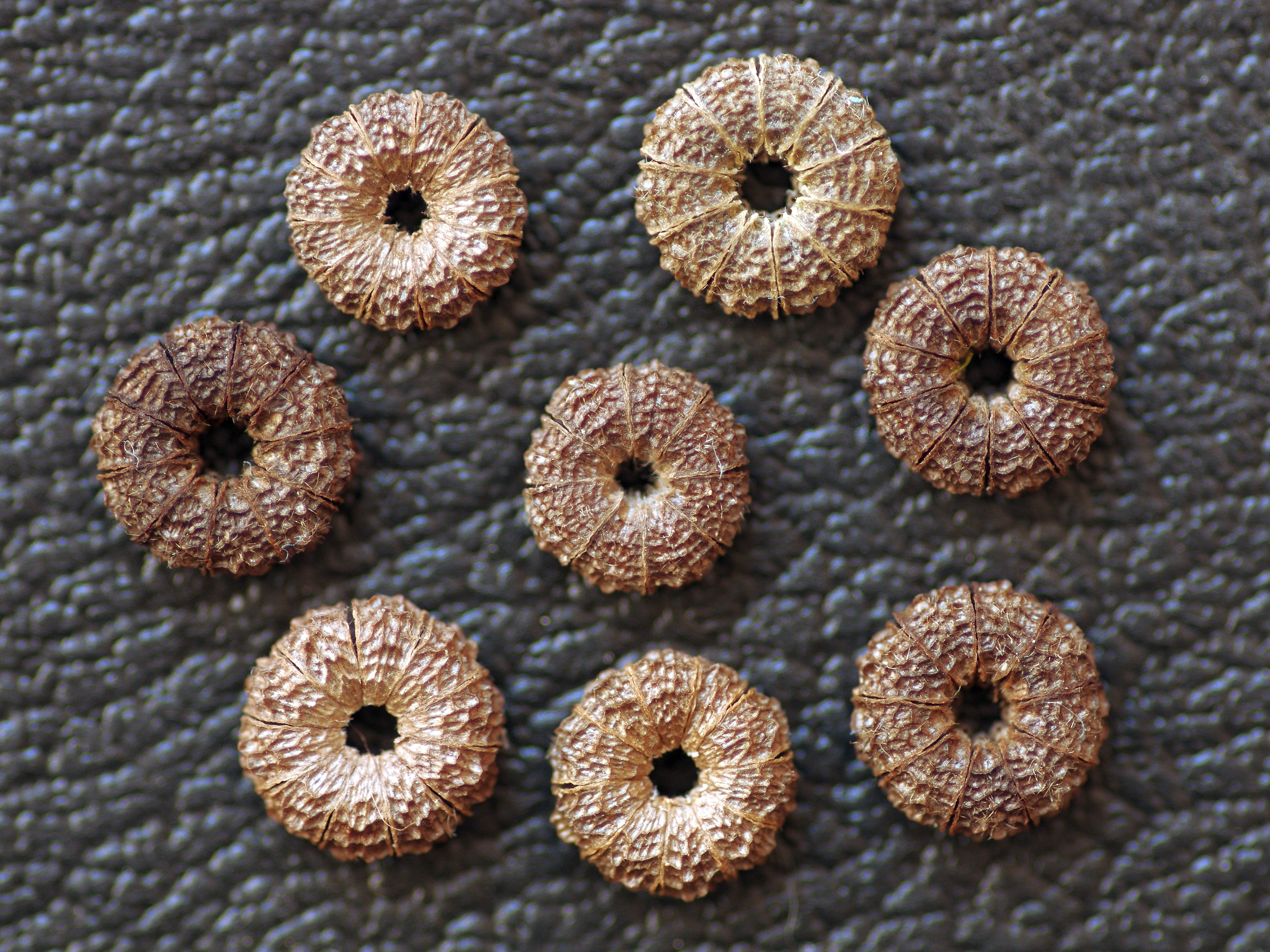
Fruit, hairless form

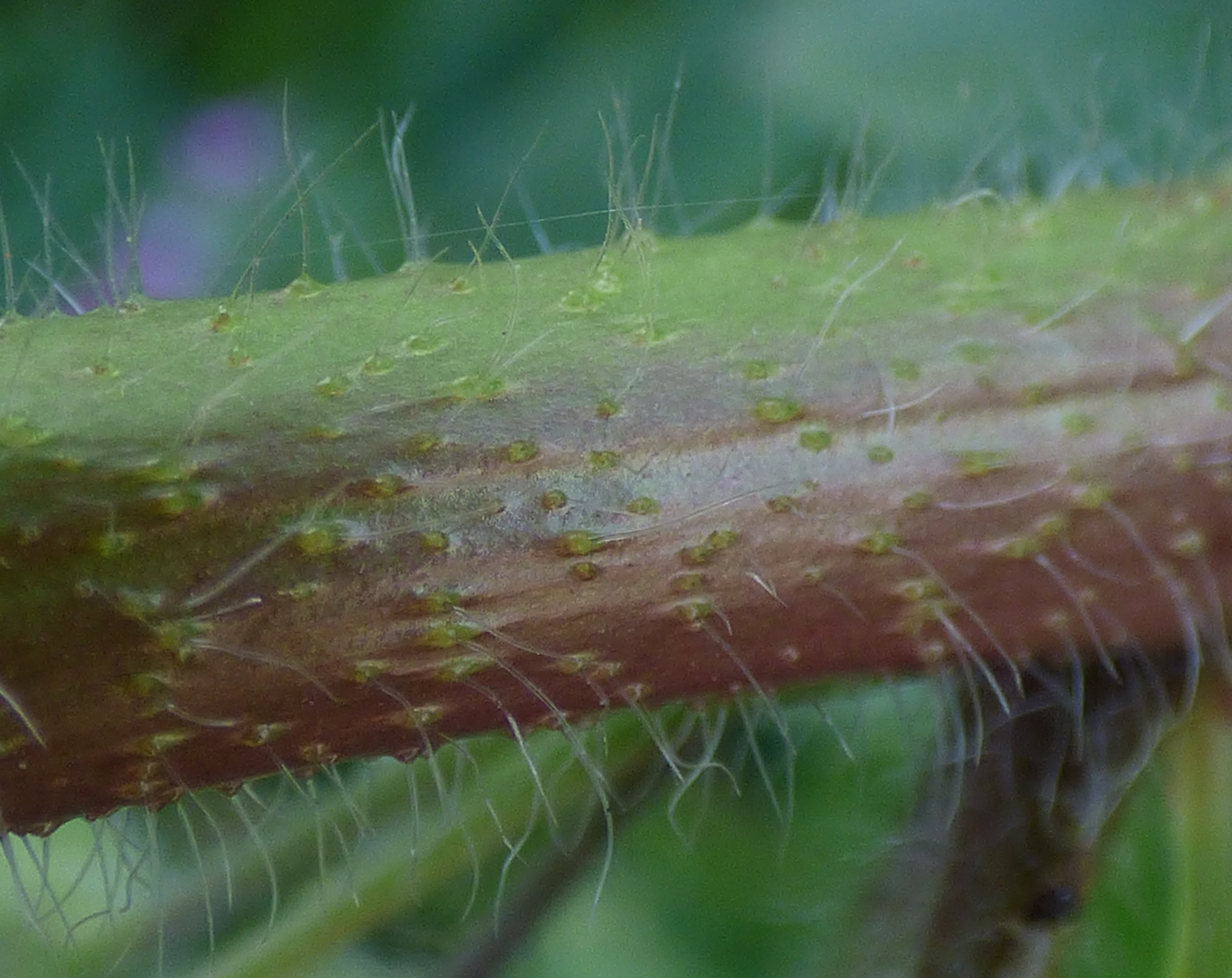
Hairs bulbous-based (may be less apparent)

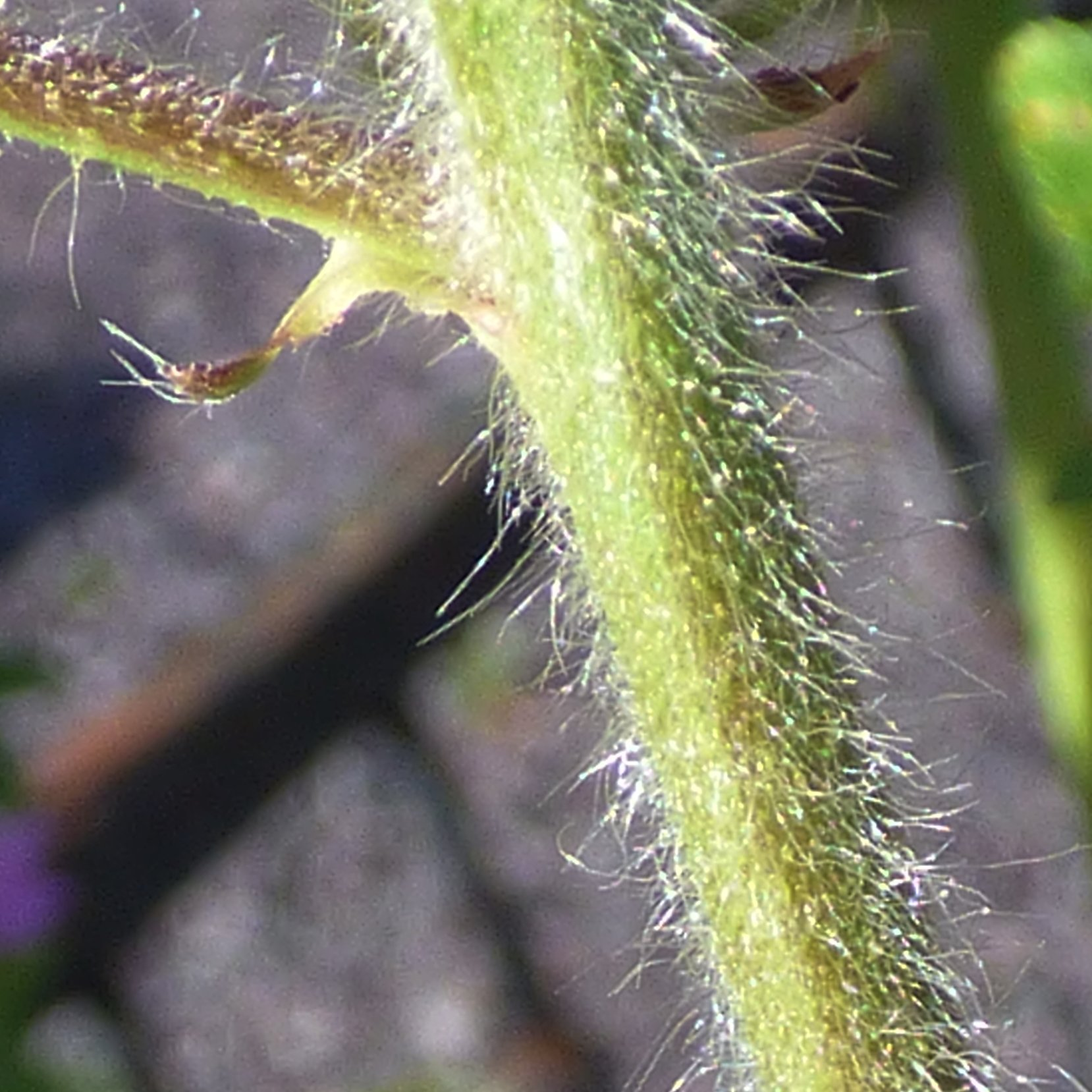
Hairs of cultivated plant, very weak with bulbous bases not very conspicuous

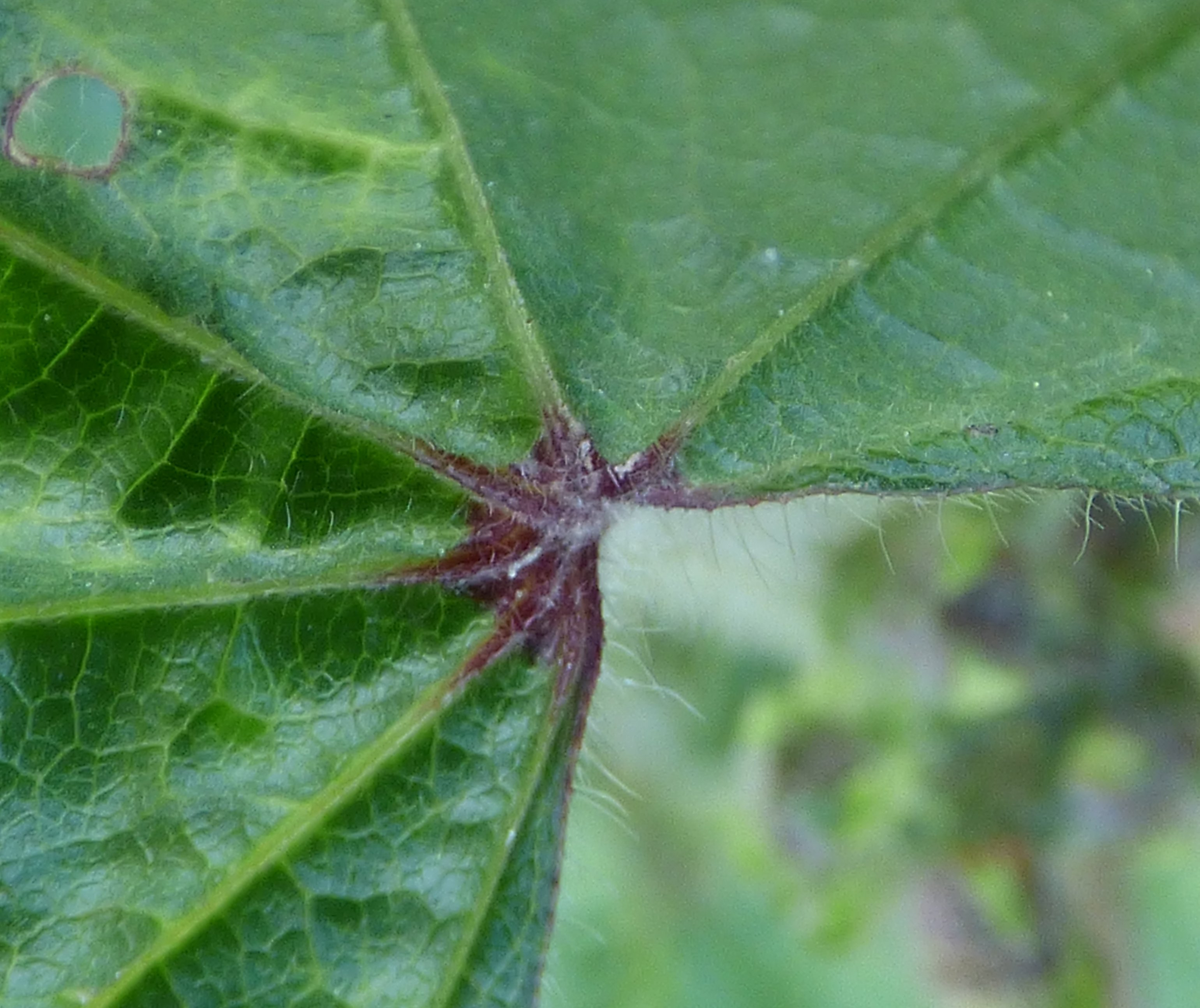
Leaf upperside

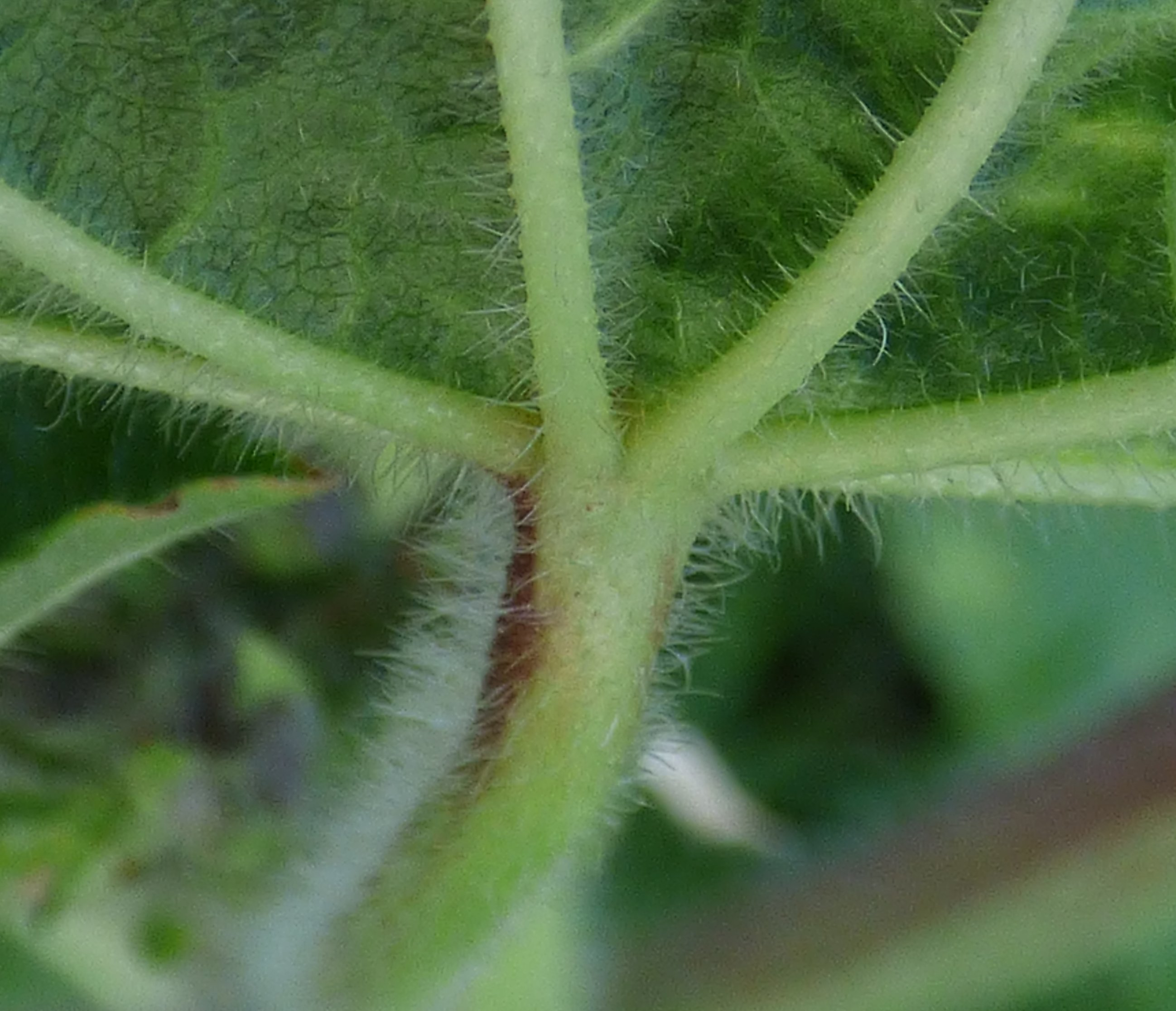
Leaf underside
