= Copigmentation =

Copigmentation is a spontaneous phenomenon where pigmentation due to anthocyanidins is reinforced by the presence of other colorless flavonoids known as cofactors or “copigments”. This occurs by the formation of a non-covalently-linked complex.

== Examples ==
Flowers

An example is the bluish purple flowers of the Japanese garden iris (Iris ensata). The characteristic floral jade coloration of Strongylodon macrobotrys has been shown to be an example of copigmentation, a result of the presence of malvin (the anthocyanin) and saponarin (a flavone glucoside) in the ratio 1:9.

Berries

It is a phenomenon observed in the berry color of the porcelain berry (Ampelopsis glandulosa).

Food

Part of the color of red wine can be due to the copigmentation phenomenon. Copigmentation is only important during the early stages of a wine's age. Anthocyanins begin to polymerize with other wine compounds, such as hydroxycinnamic acids, tannins, glyceraldehyde or proteins, to form more complex structures with covalent C–C bonds.

== See also ==
- Metalloanthocyanin
